= 1994 FIFA World Cup qualification (UEFA) =

Tournament details
- Dates: 22 April 1992 – 17 November 1993
- Teams: 36 (from 1 confederation)

Tournament statistics
- Matches played: 182
- Goals scored: 500 (2.75 per match)
- Attendance: 3,661,334 (20,117 per match)
- Top scorer(s): (Romania) Florin Răducioiu (9 goals)

A total of 39 UEFA teams entered qualification for the 1994 FIFA World Cup. However, Liechtenstein withdrew before the draw was made. The CIS, then Russia took the Soviet Union's spot after the Soviet Union dissolved while FIFA suspended Yugoslavia due to United Nations sanctions stemming from the Yugoslav wars. The European zone was allocated 13 from 24 places in the final tournament. Germany, the defending champions, qualified automatically, leaving 12 spots open for competition between 37 teams.

The 37 teams were divided into six groups, five of six teams each and one of seven teams (though Group 5 ended up with just five teams following Yugoslavia's suspension). The teams would play against each other on a home-and-away basis with the group winners and runners-up qualifying for the final tournament.

San Marino and Faroe Islands competed in World Cup qualifiers for the first time, and Israel moved to UEFA after competing in Oceanian zone for 1986 and 1990 qualification, while Estonia, Lithuania and Latvia competed separately after playing as a part of the Soviet Union from 1958 to 1990.

Greece qualified for the first time, while England and France, traditionally two of Europe's strongest teams, both failed to qualify.

== Seedings ==
The draw was made on 8 December 1991.

Pot 1 Italy England Spain Belgium Soviet Union France	Pot 2 Yugoslavia Czechoslovakia Netherlands Scotland Austria Republic of Ireland	Pot 3 Romania Denmark Poland Hungary Portugal Sweden
Pot 4 Northern Ireland Bulgaria Switzerland Norway Greece Wales	Pot 5 Turkey Iceland Finland Albania Malta Cyprus	Pot 6 Luxembourg San Marino Faroe Islands Israel Estonia Latvia Lithuania

=== Summary ===
Winner and runner-up of each group qualified directly for the 1994 FIFA World Cup
Other teams were eliminated
Suspended due to UN Sanctions

Group 1	Group 2	Group 3	Group 4	Group 5	Group 6
Italy Switzerland	Norway Netherlands	Spain Republic of Ireland	Romania Belgium	Greece Russia	Sweden Bulgaria
Portugal Scotland Malta Estonia	England Poland Turkey San Marino	Denmark Northern Ireland Lithuania Latvia Albania	Czechoslovakia Wales Cyprus Faroe Islands	Iceland Hungary Luxembourg	France Austria Finland Israel
				FR Yugoslavia	

== Groups ==
=== Group 1 ===
Pos	Team	Pld	W	D	L	GF	GA	GD	Pts	Qualification	Italy national football team	Switzerland national football team	Portugal national football team	Scotland national football team	Malta national football team	Estonia national football team
1	Italy	10	7	2	1	22	7	+15	16	Qualification to 1994 FIFA World Cup	—	2–2	1–0	3–1	6–1	2–0
2	Switzerland	10	6	3	1	23	6	+17	15	Qualification to 1994 FIFA World Cup	1–0	—	1–1	3–1	3–0	4–0
3	Portugal	10	6	2	2	18	5	+13	14		1–3	1–0	—	5–0	4–0	3–0
4	Scotland	10	4	3	3	14	13	+1	11		0–0	1–1	0–0	—	3–0	3–1
5	Malta	10	1	1	8	3	23	−20	3		1–2	0–2	0–1	0–2	—	0–0
6	Estonia	10	0	1	9	1	27	−26	1		0–3	0–6	0–2	0–3	0–1	—

=== Group 2 ===
Pos	Team	Pld	W	D	L	GF	GA	GD	Pts	Qualification	Norway national football team	Netherlands national football team	England national football team	Poland national football team	Turkey national football team	San Marino national football team
1	Norway	10	7	2	1	25	5	+20	16	Qualification to 1994 FIFA World Cup	—	2–1	2–0	1–0	3–1	10–0
2	Netherlands	10	6	3	1	29	9	+20	15	Qualification to 1994 FIFA World Cup	0–0	—	2–0	2–2	3–1	6–0
3	England	10	5	3	2	26	9	+17	13		1–1	2–2	—	3–0	4–0	6–0
4	Poland	10	3	2	5	10	15	−5	8		0–3	1–3	1–1	—	1–0	1–0
5	Turkey	10	3	1	6	11	19	−8	7		2–1	1–3	0–2	2–1	—	4–1
6	San Marino	10	0	1	9	2	46	−44	1		0–2	0–7	1–7	0–3	0–0	—

=== Group 3 ===
Pos	Team	Pld	W	D	L	GF	GA	GD	Pts	Qualification	Spain national football team	Republic of Ireland national football team	Denmark national football team	Northern Ireland national football team	Lithuania national football team	Latvia national football team	Albania national football team
1	Spain	12	8	3	1	27	4	+23	19	Qualification to 1994 FIFA World Cup	—	0–0	1–0	3–1	5–0	5–0	3–0
2	Republic of Ireland	12	7	4	1	19	6	+13	18	Qualification to 1994 FIFA World Cup	1–3	—	1–1	3–0	2–0	4–0	2–0
3	Denmark	12	7	4	1	15	2	+13	18		1–0	0–0	—	1–0	4–0	2–0	4–0
4	Northern Ireland	12	5	3	4	14	13	+1	13		0–0	1–1	0–1	—	2–2	2–0	3–0
5	Lithuania	12	2	3	7	8	21	−13	7		0–2	0–1	0–0	0–1	—	1–1	3–1
6	Latvia	12	0	5	7	4	21	−17	5		0–0	0–2	0–0	1–2	1–2	—	0–0
7	Albania	12	1	2	9	6	26	−20	4		1–5	1–2	0–1	1–2	1–0	1–1	—

=== Group 4 ===
Pos	Team	Pld	W	D	L	GF	GA	GD	Pts	Qualification	Romania national football team	Belgium national football team	Czechoslovakia national football team	Wales national football team	Cyprus national football team	Faroe Islands national football team
1	Romania	10	7	1	2	29	12	+17	15	Qualification to 1994 FIFA World Cup	—	2–1	1–1	5–1	2–1	7–0
2	Belgium	10	7	1	2	16	5	+11	15	Qualification to 1994 FIFA World Cup	1–0	—	0–0	2–0	1–0	3–0
3	RCS (Note: During the qualification, Czechoslovakia split into the independent states of the Czech Republic and Slovakia. The two states completed the qualifiers jointly under the name Representation of Czechs and Slovaks (RCS).)	10	4	5	1	21	9	+12	13		5–2	1–2	—	1–1	3–0	4–0
4	Wales	10	5	2	3	19	12	+7	12		1–2	2–0	2–2	—	2–0	6–0
5	Cyprus	10	2	1	7	8	18	−10	5		1–4	0–3	1–1	0–1	—	3–1
6	Faroe Islands	10	0	0	10	1	38	−37	0		0–4	0–3	0–3	0–3	0–2	—

=== Group 5 ===
Pos	Team	Pld	W	D	L	GF	GA	GD	Pts	Qualification	Greece national football team	Russia national football team	Iceland national football team	Hungary national football team	Luxembourg national football team	Serbia and Montenegro national football team
1	Greece	8	6	2	0	10	2	+8	14	Qualification to 1994 FIFA World Cup	—	1–0	1–0	0–0	2–0	–
2	Russia	8	5	2	1	15	4	+11	12	Qualification to 1994 FIFA World Cup	1–1	—	1–0	3–0	2–0	–
3	Iceland	8	3	2	3	7	6	+1	8		0–1	1–1	—	2–0	1–0	–
4	Hungary	8	2	1	5	6	11	−5	5		0–1	1–3	1–2	—	1–0	–
5	Luxembourg	8	0	1	7	2	17	−15	1		1–3	0–4	1–1	0–3	—	–
6	FR Yugoslavia	0	0	0	0	0	0	0	0	Suspended due to UN Sanctions	–	–	–	–	–	—

=== Group 6 ===
Pos	Team	Pld	W	D	L	GF	GA	GD	Pts	Qualification	Sweden men's national football team	Bulgaria national football team	France national football team	Austria national football team	Finland national football team	Israel national football team
1	Sweden	10	6	3	1	19	8	+11	15	Qualification to 1994 FIFA World Cup	—	2–0	1–1	1–0	3–2	5–0
2	Bulgaria	10	6	2	2	19	10	+9	14	Qualification to 1994 FIFA World Cup	1–1	—	2–0	4–1	2–0	2–2
3	France	10	6	1	3	17	10	+7	13		2–1	1–2	—	2–0	2–1	2–3
4	Austria	10	3	2	5	15	16	−1	8		1–1	3–1	0–1	—	3–0	5–2
5	Finland	10	2	1	7	9	18	−9	5		0–1	0–3	0–2	3–1	—	0–0
6	Israel	10	1	3	6	10	27	−17	5		1–3	0–2	0–4	1–1	1–3	—

== Qualified teams ==
The following 13 teams from UEFA qualified for the final tournament.

Team	Qualified as	Qualified on	Previous appearances in FIFA World Cup^{1}
Germany	Defending champions	8 July 1990	12 (1934, 1938, **1954**^{2}, 1958^{2}, 1962^{2}, 1966^{2}, 1970^{2}, **1974**^{2}, 1978^{2}, 1982^{2}, 1986^{2}, **1990**^{2})
Italy	Group 1 winners	17 November 1993	12 (**1934**, **1938**, 1950, 1954, 1962, 1966, 1970, 1974, 1978, **1982**, 1986, 1990)
Switzerland	Group 1 runners-up	17 November 1993	6 (1934, 1938, 1950, 1954, 1962, 1966)
Norway	Group 2 winners	13 October 1993	1 (1938)
Netherlands	Group 2 runners-up	17 November 1993	5 (1934, 1938, 1974, 1978, 1990)
Spain	Group 3 winners	17 November 1993	8 (1934, 1950, 1962, 1966, 1978, 1982, 1986, 1990)
Republic of Ireland	Group 3 runners-up	17 November 1993	1 (1990)
Romania	Group 4 winners	17 November 1993	5 (1930, 1934, 1938, 1970, 1990)
Belgium	Group 4 runners-up	17 November 1993	8 (1930, 1934, 1938, 1954, 1970, 1982, 1986, 1990)
Greece	Group 5 winners	23 May 1993	0 (debut)
Russia	Group 5 runners-up	2 June 1993	7 (1958^{3}, 1962^{3}, 1966^{3}, 1970^{3}, 1982^{3}, 1986^{3}, 1990^{3})
Sweden	Group 6 winners	10 November 1993	8 (1934, 1938, 1950, 1958, 1970, 1974, 1978, 1990)
Bulgaria	Group 6 runners-up	17 November 1993	5 (1962, 1966, 1970, 1974, 1986)

^{1} Bold indicates champions for that year. Italic indicates hosts for that year.
^{2} Competed as West Germany. A separate team for East Germany also participated in qualifications during this time, having only competed in 1974.
^{3} Competed as Soviet Union.

== Goalscorers ==
9 goals

- (Romania) Florin Răducioiu

8 goals

- (Wales) Ian Rush

7 goals

- (England) David Platt
- (Spain) Julio Salinas
- (Sweden) Martin Dahlin

6 goals

- (Czechoslovakia) Peter Dubovský
- (France) Eric Cantona
- (Republic of Ireland) John Aldridge
- (Netherlands) Peter van Vossen
- (Switzerland) Stéphane Chapuisat

5 goals

- (Austria) Andreas Herzog
- (Belgium) Marc Wilmots
- (Bulgaria) Hristo Stoichkov
- (England) Ian Wright
- (Italy) Roberto Baggio
- (Netherlands) Dennis Bergkamp
- (Norway) Kjetil Rekdal
- (Romania) Gheorghe Hagi
- (Switzerland) Adrian Knup

4 goals

- (Belgium) Enzo Scifo
- (Bulgaria) Emil Kostadinov
- (Cyprus) Andreas Sotiriou
- (Denmark) Frank Pingel
- (England) Paul Gascoigne
- (France) Jean-Pierre Papin
- (Romania) Ilie Dumitrescu
- (Romania) Gavril Balint
- (Russia) Sergei Kiriakov
- (Switzerland) Georges Bregy
- (Wales) Dean Saunders

3 goals

- (Bulgaria) Lyuboslav Penev
- (Czechoslovakia) Pavel Kuka
- (Denmark) Kim Vilfort
- (England) Les Ferdinand
- (France) Laurent Blanc
- (Hungary) Kálmán Kovács
- (Republic of Ireland) Steve Staunton
- (Israel) Ronen Harazi
- (Italy) Dino Baggio
- (Italy) Roberto Mancini
- (Italy) Giuseppe Signori
- (Latvia) Ainārs Linards
- (Netherlands) John Bosman
- (Netherlands) Ronald de Boer
- (Northern Ireland) Kevin Wilson
- (Norway) Jostein Flo
- (Norway) Gunnar Halle
- (Norway) Gøran Sørloth
- (Poland) Marek Leśniak
- (Portugal) Jorge Cadete
- (Romania) Ioan Lupescu
- (Russia) Sergei Yuran
- (Scotland) Ally McCoist
- (Scotland) Pat Nevin
- (Spain) Txiki Begiristain
- (Spain) Fernando Hierro
- (Sweden) Tomas Brolin
- (Switzerland) Christophe Ohrel
- (Turkey) Feyyaz Uçar
- (Turkey) Hakan Şükür

2 goals

- (Albania) Sokol Kushta
- (Austria) Dietmar Kühbauer
- (Austria) Heimo Pfeifenberger
- (Austria) Anton Polster
- (Belgium) Philippe Albert
- (Bulgaria) Krasimir Balakov
- (Bulgaria) Nasko Sirakov
- (Czechoslovakia) Radoslav Látal
- (Czechoslovakia) Václav Němeček
- (Czechoslovakia) Marek Poštulka
- (Denmark) Brian Laudrup
- (England) Paul Ince
- (England) Stuart Pearce
- (Finland) Ari Hjelm
- (Finland) Aki Hyryläinen
- (France) Franck Sauzée
- (Greece) Stratos Apostolakis
- (Greece) Nikos Machlas
- (Greece) Tasos Mitropoulos
- (Hungary) Lajos Détári
- (Iceland) Arnór Guðjohnsen
- (Iceland) Eyjólfur Sverrisson
- (Republic of Ireland) Paul McGrath
- (Republic of Ireland) Niall Quinn
- (Israel) Ronny Rosenthal
- (Israel) Itzik Zohar
- (Italy) Pierluigi Casiraghi
- (Italy) Stefano Eranio
- (Lithuania) Robertas Fridrikas
- (Netherlands) John de Wolf
- (Netherlands) Wim Jonk
- (Netherlands) Ronald Koeman
- (Netherlands) Rob Witschge
- (Northern Ireland) Jim Magilton
- (Northern Ireland) Jimmy Quinn
- (Northern Ireland) Gerry Taggart
- (Norway) Lars Bohinen
- (Norway) Jan Åge Fjørtoft
- (Norway) Mini Jakobsen
- (Norway) Roger Nilsen
- (Poland) Wojciech Kowalczyk
- (Portugal) Rui Águas
- (Portugal) Rui Barros
- (Portugal) Rui Costa
- (Portugal) Paulo Futre
- (Portugal) João Domingos Pinto
- (Scotland) John Collins
- (Scotland) Kevin Gallacher
- (Spain) José Mari Bakero
- (Spain) José Luis Caminero
- (Spain) Julen Guerrero
- (Spain) Míchel
- (Sweden) Klas Ingesson
- (Switzerland) Ciriaco Sforza
- (Turkey) Ertuğrul Sağlam
- (Wales) Ryan Giggs
- (Wales) Mark Hughes

1 goal

- (Albania) Eduard Abazi
- (Albania) Sulejman Demollari
- (Albania) Ilir Kepa
- (Albania) Altin Rraklli
- (Austria) Andreas Ogris
- (Austria) Hannes Reinmayr
- (Austria) Peter Stöger
- (Austria) Michael Zisser
- (Belgium) Alexandre Czerniatynski
- (Belgium) Marc Degryse
- (Belgium) Rudi Smidts
- (Belgium) Lorenzo Staelens
- (Bulgaria) Trifon Ivanov
- (Bulgaria) Yordan Letchkov
- (Bulgaria) Zlatko Yankov
- (Cyprus) Yiannos Ioannou
- (Cyprus) Nikos Papavasiliou
- (Cyprus) Pambos Pittas
- (Cyprus) Panayiotis Xiourouppas
- (Czechoslovakia) Pavel Hapal
- (Czechoslovakia) Ivan Hašek
- (Czechoslovakia) Miroslav Kadlec
- (Czechoslovakia) Ľubomír Moravčík
- (Czechoslovakia) Tomáš Skuhravý
- (Czechoslovakia) Petr Vrabec
- (Denmark) John Jensen
- (Denmark) Henrik Larsen
- (Denmark) Peter Møller
- (Denmark) Lars Olsen
- (Denmark) Flemming Povlsen
- (Denmark) Mark Strudal
- (England) John Barnes
- (England) Carlton Palmer
- (England) Alan Shearer
- (Estonia) Sergei Bragin
- (Faroe Islands) Uni Arge
- (Finland) Petri Järvinen
- (Finland) Jari Litmanen
- (Finland) Mika-Matti Paatelainen
- (Finland) Marko Rajamäki
- (Finland) Kim Suominen
- (France) David Ginola
- (France) Alain Roche
- (Greece) Vasilis Dimitriadis
- (Greece) Dimitris Saravakos
- (Greece) Panagiotis Sofianopoulos
- (Greece) Panagiotis Tsalouchidis
- (Hungary) László Klausz
- (Iceland) Haraldur Ingólfsson
- (Iceland) Hörður Magnússon
- (Iceland) Þorvaldur Örlygsson
- (Republic of Ireland) Tony Cascarino
- (Republic of Ireland) Alan Kernaghan
- (Republic of Ireland) Alan McLoughlin
- (Republic of Ireland) Kevin Sheedy
- (Republic of Ireland) John Sheridan
- (Republic of Ireland) Andy Townsend
- (Israel) Reuven Atar
- (Israel) Tal Banin
- (Israel) Eyal Berkovic
- (Italy) Roberto Donadoni
- (Italy) Paolo Maldini
- (Italy) Gianluca Vialli
- (Italy) Pietro Vierchowod
- (Latvia) Oļegs Aleksejenko
- (Lithuania) Virginijus Baltušnikas
- (Lithuania) Stasys Baranauskas
- (Lithuania) Arminas Narbekovas
- (Lithuania) Eimantas Poderis
- (Lithuania) Viačeslavas Sukristovas
- (Lithuania) Andrėjus Tereškinas
- (Luxembourg) Stefano Fanelli
- (Malta) Carmel Busuttil
- (Malta) Martin Gregory
- (Malta) Kristian Laferla
- (Netherlands) Ruud Gullit
- (Netherlands) Marc Overmars
- (Netherlands) John van den Brom
- (Northern Ireland) Colin Clarke
- (Northern Ireland) Mal Donaghy
- (Northern Ireland) Iain Dowie
- (Northern Ireland) Phil Gray
- (Northern Ireland) Alan McDonald
- (Norway) Ronny Johnsen
- (Norway) Oyvind Leonhardsen
- (Norway) Erik Mykland
- (Poland) Dariusz Adamczuk
- (Poland) Marek Koźmiński
- (Poland) Jan Furtok
- (Poland) Tomasz Wałdoch
- (Poland) Krzysztof Warzycha
- (Portugal) Fernando Couto
- (Portugal) Oceano da Cruz
- (Portugal) António Folha
- (Portugal) António Nogueira
- (Portugal) José Orlando Semedo
- (Romania) Ovidiu Hanganu
- (Romania) Marius Lăcătuș
- (Romania) Constantin Pană
- (Romania) Gheorghe Popescu
- (Russia) Aleksandr Borodiuk
- (Russia) Igor Dobrovolski
- (Russia) Andrei Kanchelskis
- (Russia) Igor Kolyvanov
- (Russia) Vasili Kulkov
- (Russia) Andrei Piatnitski
- (Russia) Dmitri Radchenko
- (Russia) Igor Shalimov
- (San Marino) Davide Gualtieri
- (San Marino) Nicola Bacciocchi
- (Scotland) Scott Booth
- (Scotland) Colin Hendry
- (Scotland) Brian McClair
- (Scotland) Billy McKinlay
- (Spain) Adolfo Aldana
- (Spain) Thomas Christiansen
- (Spain) Pep Guardiola
- (Spain) Cristóbal Parralo
- (Spain) Alfonso Pérez
- (Spain) Toni
- (Sweden) Jan Eriksson
- (Sweden) Stefan Landberg
- (Sweden) Henrik Larsson
- (Sweden) Anders Limpar
- (Sweden) Håkan Mild
- (Sweden) Stefan Pettersson
- (Sweden) Pär Zetterberg
- (Switzerland) Thomas Bickel
- (Switzerland) Marc Hottiger
- (Switzerland) Kubilay Türkyilmaz
- (Turkey) Bülent Korkmaz
- (Turkey) Hami Mandıralı
- (Turkey) Orhan Çıkırıkçı
- (Wales) Clayton Blackmore
- (Wales) Mark Bowen
- (Wales) Eric Young

1 own goal

- (Czechoslovakia) Jozef Chovanec (playing against Belgium)
- (Iceland) Hlynur Birgisson (playing against Luxembourg)
- (San Marino) Nicola Bacciocchi (playing against the Netherlands)

== See also ==
- 1994 FIFA World Cup qualification (AFC)
- 1994 FIFA World Cup qualification (CAF)
- 1994 FIFA World Cup qualification (CONCACAF)
- 1994 FIFA World Cup qualification (CONMEBOL)
- 1994 FIFA World Cup qualification (OFC)

== Notes ==
- To date, this was the last time that England and France failed to qualify for a FIFA World Cup.
