= San Marino national football team results =

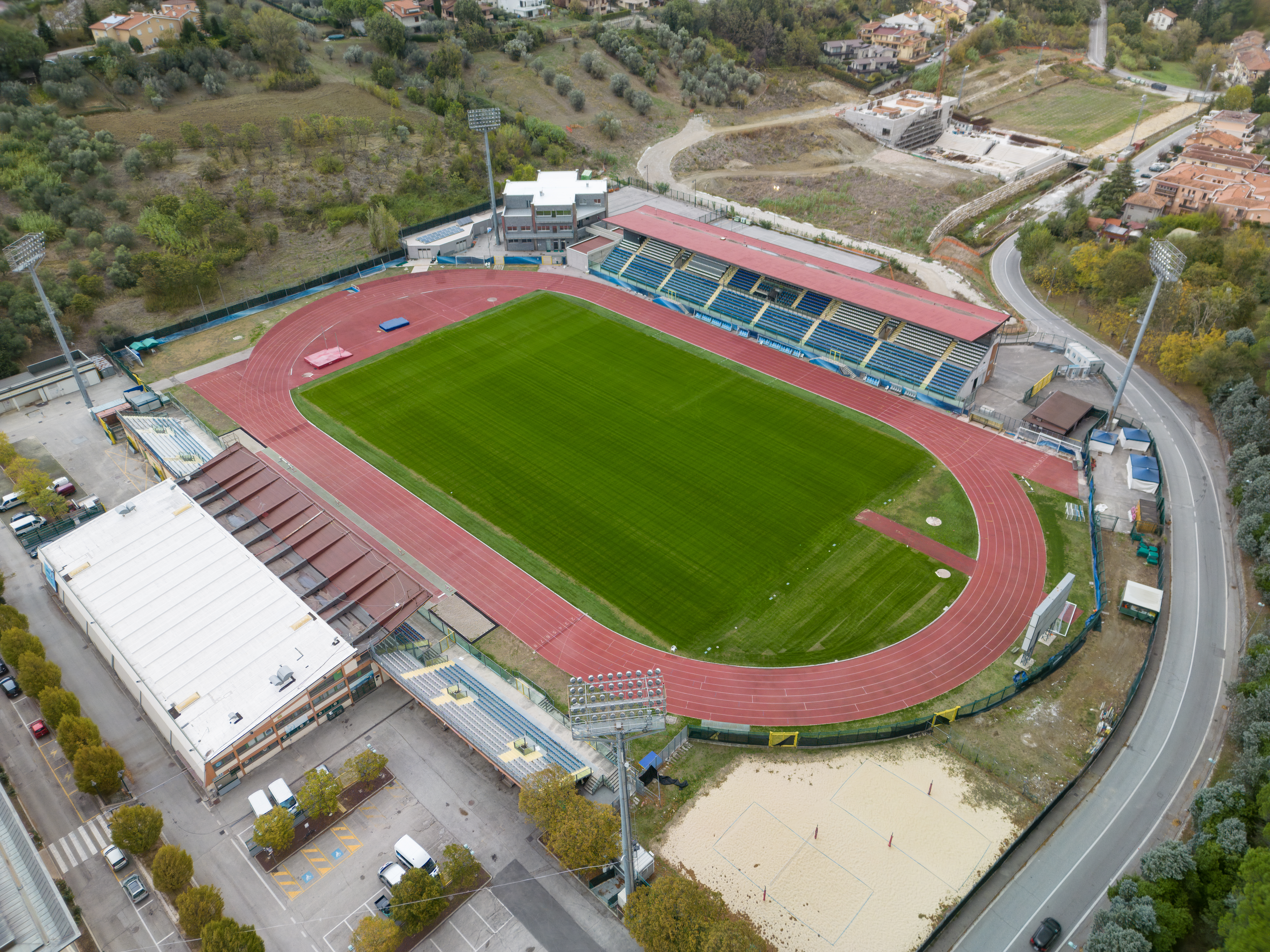
The San Marino Stadium, formerly known as Stadio Olimpico, is used as the home stadium for the San Marino national football team.

The San Marino national football team's first official match took place on 14 November 1990 against Switzerland. Previously, unofficial matches had taken place against the Canada U-23 team in 1986 and a series of matches at the 1987 Mediterranean Games against Lebanon, Turkey and Syria. These matches took place prior to the nation's affiliation with FIFA. San Marino has not qualified for the finals of a major international football tournament. Andy Selva is the team's top scorer with eight goals.

San Marino has lost all but 13 of the more than 200 matches they have played, winning only three times. All of their victories so far have come against Liechtenstein. The first victory occurred in a friendly match on 28 April 2004 and the second – 20 years later and their first competitive win – occurred in the UEFA Nations League on 5 September 2024. Both games ended 1–0. Their most recent win was a 3–1 comeback away from home on 18 November 2024. They have drawn 10 matches (including a draw in an unofficial match against Lebanon).

As of July 2024, San Marino are ranked 210th and last in the FIFA World Rankings. Their highest international rank achieved was 118th in September 1993.

== Results ==
San Marino's score is shown first in each case.

San Marino national football team results
No.	Date	Venue	H/A/N	Opponents	Score	Competition	San Marino scorers	Att.	Ref.
1	14 November 1990	Stadio Olimpico, Serravalle	H	Switzerland	0–4	UEFA Euro 1992 qualifying		931	
2	5 December 1990	Stadionul Steaua, Bucharest	A	Romania	0–6	UEFA Euro 1992 qualifying		6,380	
3	27 March 1991	Stadio Olimpico, Serravalle	H	Romania	1–3	UEFA Euro 1992 qualifying	Pasolini	745	
4	1 May 1991	Stadio Olimpico, Serravalle	H	Scotland	0–2	UEFA Euro 1992 qualifying		3,512	
5	22 May 1991	Stadio Olimpico, Serravalle	H	Bulgaria	0–3	UEFA Euro 1992 qualifying		612	
6	5 June 1991	Espenmoos, St. Gallen	A	Switzerland	0–7	UEFA Euro 1992 qualifying		6,982	
7	16 October 1991	Vasil Levski National Stadium, Sofia	A	Bulgaria	0–4	UEFA Euro 1992 qualifying		7,352	
8	13 November 1991	Hampden Park, Glasgow	A	Scotland	0–4	UEFA Euro 1992 qualifying		35,170	
9	19 February 1992	Stadio Dino Manuzzi, Cesena	A	Italy	0–4	Friendly		18,353	
10	9 September 1992	Ullevaal Stadion, Oslo	A	Norway	0–10	1994 FIFA World Cup qualification		6,511	
11	7 October 1992	Stadio Olimpico, Serravalle	H	Norway	0–2	1994 FIFA World Cup qualification		1,187	
12	28 October 1992	Ankara 19 Mayıs Stadium, Ankara	A	Turkey	1–4	1994 FIFA World Cup qualification	Bacciocchi	22,303	
13	17 February 1993	Original Wembley Stadium, London	A	England	0–6	1994 FIFA World Cup qualification		51,154	
14	10 March 1993	Stadio Olimpico, Serravalle	H	Turkey	0–0	1994 FIFA World Cup qualification		957	
15	24 March 1993	Stadion Galgenwaard, Utrecht	A	Netherlands	0–6	1994 FIFA World Cup qualification		12,500	
16	28 April 1993	Stadion Widzewa, Łódź	A	Poland	0–1	1994 FIFA World Cup qualification		10,000	
17	19 May 1993	Stadio Olimpico, Serravalle	H	Poland	0–3	1994 FIFA World Cup qualification		1,223	
18	22 September 1993	Stadio Renato Dall'Ara, Bologna	H (Note: San Marino played their home matches against the Netherlands and England during qualifying for the 1994 FIFA World Cup in Bologna, Italy due to safety concerns.)	Netherlands	0–7	1994 FIFA World Cup qualification		3,340	
19	17 November 1993	Stadio Renato Dall'Ara, Bologna	H	England	1–7	1994 FIFA World Cup qualification	Gualtieri	2,378	
20	12 October 1994	Luzhniki Stadium, Moscow	A	Russia	0–4	UEFA Euro 1996 qualifying		5,500	
21	16 November 1994	Olympic Stadium, Athens	A	Greece	0–2	UEFA Euro 1996 qualifying		2,859	
22	14 December 1994	Helsinki Olympic Stadium, Helsinki	A	Finland	1–4	UEFA Euro 1996 qualifying	P. D. Della Valle	3,140	
23	29 March 1995	Stadio Olimpico, Serravalle	H	Finland	0–2	UEFA Euro 1996 qualifying		824	
24	26 April 1995	Stadio Olimpico, Serravalle	H	Scotland	0–2	UEFA Euro 1996 qualifying		2,738	
25	25 May 1995	Svangaskarð, Toftir	A	Faroe Islands	0–3	UEFA Euro 1996 qualifying		3,450	
26	7 June 1995	Stadio Olimpico, Serravalle	H	Russia	0–7	UEFA Euro 1996 qualifying		1,367	
27	6 September 1995	Stadio Olimpico, Serravalle	H	Greece	0–4	UEFA Euro 1996 qualifying		886	
28	11 October 1995	Stadio Olimpico, Serravalle	H	Faroe Islands	1–3	UEFA Euro 1996 qualifying	Valentini	928	
29	15 November 1995	Hampden Park, Glasgow	A	Scotland	0–5	UEFA Euro 1996 qualifying		29,492	
30	2 June 1996	Stadio Olimpico, Serravalle	H	Wales	0–5	1998 FIFA World Cup qualification		1,613	
31	31 August 1996	Cardiff Arms Park, Cardiff	A	Wales	0–6	1998 FIFA World Cup qualification		15,150	
32	9 October 1996	Stadio Olimpico, Serravalle	H	Belgium	0–3	1998 FIFA World Cup qualification		1,353	
33	10 November 1996	Ali Sami Yen Stadium, Istanbul	A	Turkey	0–7	1998 FIFA World Cup qualification		19,654	
34	29 March 1997	Amsterdam Arena, Amsterdam	A	Netherlands	0–4	1998 FIFA World Cup qualification		47,000	
35	30 April 1997	Stadio Olimpico, Serravalle	H	Netherlands	0–6	1998 FIFA World Cup qualification		2,832	
36	7 June 1997	King Baudouin Stadium, Brussels	A	Belgium	0–6	1998 FIFA World Cup qualification		24,105	
37	10 September 1997	Stadio Olimpico, Serravalle	H	Turkey	0–5	1998 FIFA World Cup qualification		947	
38	10 October 1998	Stadio Olimpico, Serravalle	H	Israel	0–5	UEFA Euro 2000 qualifying		872	
39	14 October 1998	Stadio Olimpico, Serravalle	H	Austria	1–4	UEFA Euro 2000 qualifying	Selva	1,218	
40	18 November 1998	Stadio Olimpico, Serravalle	H	Cyprus	0–1	UEFA Euro 2000 qualifying		510	
41	10 February 1999	Tsirio Stadium, Limassol	A	Cyprus	0–4	UEFA Euro 2000 qualifying		400	
42	31 March 1999	Stadio Olimpico, Serravalle	H	Spain	0–6	UEFA Euro 2000 qualifying		2,020	
43	28 April 1999	Arnold Schwarzenegger Stadium, Graz	A	Austria	0–7	UEFA Euro 2000 qualifying		15,400	
44	5 June 1999	El Madrigal, Villarreal	A	Spain	0–9	UEFA Euro 2000 qualifying		16,150	
45	8 September 1999	Ramat Gan Stadium, Ramat Gan	A	Israel	0–8	UEFA Euro 2000 qualifying		25,078	
46	26 April 2000	Stadio Olimpico, Serravalle	H	Moldova	0–1	Friendly		100	
47	7 October 2000	Stadio Olimpico, Serravalle	H	Scotland	0–2	2002 FIFA World Cup qualification		4,377	
48	15 November 2000	Stadio Olimpico, Serravalle	H	Latvia	0–1	2002 FIFA World Cup qualification		517	
49	28 February 2001	King Baudouin Stadium, Brussels	A	Belgium	1–10	2002 FIFA World Cup qualification	Selva	40,104	
50	28 March 2001	Hampden Park, Glasgow	A	Scotland	0–4	2002 FIFA World Cup qualification		27,313	
51	25 April 2001	Skonto Stadium, Riga	A	Latvia	1–1	2002 FIFA World Cup qualification	Albani	4,000	
52	2 June 2001	Stadion Varteks, Varaždin	A	Croatia	0–4	2002 FIFA World Cup qualification		6,620	
53	6 June 2001	Stadio Olimpico, Serravalle	H	Belgium	1–4	2002 FIFA World Cup qualification	Selva	1,538	
54	5 September 2001	Stadio Olimpico, Serravalle	H	Croatia	0–4	2002 FIFA World Cup qualification		1,387	
55	21 May 2002	Stadio Olimpico, Serravalle	H	Estonia	0–1	Friendly		250	
56	7 September 2002	Stadio Olimpico, Serravalle	H	Poland	0–2	UEFA Euro 2004 qualifying		2,421	
57	16 October 2002	Megyeri úti Stadion, Budapest	A	Hungary	0–3	UEFA Euro 2004 qualifying		4,136	
58	20 November 2002	Stadio Olimpico, Serravalle	H	Latvia	0–1	UEFA Euro 2004 qualifying		637	
59	2 April 2003	Miejski Stadion Sportowy KSZO, Ostrowiec Swietokrzyski	A	Poland	0–5	UEFA Euro 2004 qualifying		8,000	
60	30 April 2003	Skonto Stadium, Riga	A	Latvia	0–3	UEFA Euro 2004 qualifying		7,500	
61	7 June 2003	Stadio Olimpico, Serravalle	H	Sweden	0–6	UEFA Euro 2004 qualifying		2,184	
62	11 June 2003	Stadio Olimpico, Serravalle	H	Hungary	0–5	UEFA Euro 2004 qualifying		1,410	
63	20 August 2003	Rheinpark Stadion, Vaduz	A	Liechtenstein	2–2	Friendly	Gasperoni, Ciacci	850	
64	6 September 2003	Ullevi, Gothenburg	A	Sweden	0–5	UEFA Euro 2004 qualifying		31,098	
65	28 April 2004	Stadio Olimpico, Serravalle	H	Liechtenstein	1–0	Friendly	Selva	200	
66	4 September 2004	Stadio Olimpico, Serravalle	H	Serbia and Montenegro	0–3	2006 FIFA World Cup qualification		1,137	
67	8 September 2004	Steponas Darius and Stasys Girėnas Stadium, Kaunas	A	Lithuania	0–4	2006 FIFA World Cup qualification		4,000	
68	13 October 2004	Red Star Stadium, Belgrade	A	Serbia and Montenegro	0–5	2006 FIFA World Cup qualification		4,000	
69	17 November 2004	Stadio Olimpico, Serravalle	H	Lithuania	0–1	2006 FIFA World Cup qualification		1,457	
70	9 February 2005	Estadio de los Juegos Mediterráneos, Almería	A	Spain	0–5	2006 FIFA World Cup qualification		12,580	
71	30 March 2005	Stadio Olimpico, Serravalle	H	Belgium	1–2	2006 FIFA World Cup qualification	Selva	871	
72	4 June 2005	Stadio Olimpico, Serravalle	H	Bosnia and Herzegovina	1–3	2006 FIFA World Cup qualification	Selva	747	
73	7 September 2005	Olympisch Stadion, Antwerp	A	Belgium	0–8	2006 FIFA World Cup qualification		8,207	
74	8 October 2005	Bilino Polje Stadium, Zenica	A	Bosnia and Herzegovina	0–3	2006 FIFA World Cup qualification		8,500	
75	12 October 2005	Stadio Olimpico, Serravalle	H	Spain	0–6	2006 FIFA World Cup qualification		3,426	
76	16 August 2006	Stadio Olimpico, Serravalle	H	Albania	0–3	Friendly		700	
77	6 September 2006	Stadio Olimpico, Serravalle	H	Germany	0–13	UEFA Euro 2008 qualifying		5,019	
78	7 October 2006	Stadion u Nisy, Liberec	A	Czech Republic	0–7	UEFA Euro 2008 qualifying		9,514	
79	15 November 2006	Lansdowne Road, Dublin	A	Republic of Ireland	0–5	UEFA Euro 2008 qualifying		34,018	
80	7 February 2007	Stadio Olimpico, Serravalle	H	Republic of Ireland	1–2	UEFA Euro 2008 qualifying	Marani	3,294	
81	28 March 2007	Millennium Stadium, Cardiff	A	Wales	0–3	UEFA Euro 2008 qualifying		18,752	
82	2 June 2007	Frankenstadion, Nuremberg	A	Germany	0–6	UEFA Euro 2008 qualifying		43,967	
83	22 August 2007	Stadio Olimpico, Serravalle	H	Cyprus	0–1	UEFA Euro 2008 qualifying		552	
84	8 September 2007	Stadio Olimpico, Serravalle	H	Czech Republic	0–3	UEFA Euro 2008 qualifying		3,412	
85	12 September 2007	GSP Stadium, Strovolos	A	Cyprus	0–3	UEFA Euro 2008 qualifying		600	
86	13 October 2007	Športová Hala, Dubnica nad Váhom	A	Slovakia	0–7	UEFA Euro 2008 qualifying		2,576	
87	17 October 2007	Stadio Olimpico, Serravalle	H	Wales	1–2	UEFA Euro 2008 qualifying	Selva	1,182	
88	21 November 2007	Stadio Olimpico, Serravalle	H	Slovakia	0–5	UEFA Euro 2008 qualifying		538	
89	10 September 2008	Stadio Olimpico, Serravalle	H	Poland	0–2	2010 FIFA World Cup qualification		2,374	
90	11 October 2008	Stadio Olimpico, Serravalle	H	Slovakia	1–3	2010 FIFA World Cup qualification	Selva	1,037	
91	15 October 2008	Windsor Park, Belfast	A	Northern Ireland	0–4	2010 FIFA World Cup qualification		12,957	
92	19 November 2008	Stadio Olimpico, Serravalle	H	Czech Republic	0–3	2010 FIFA World Cup qualification		1,318	
93	11 February 2009	Stadio Olimpico, Serravalle	H	Northern Ireland	0–3	2010 FIFA World Cup qualification		1,942	
94	1 April 2009	Stadion Miejski, Kielce	A	Poland	0–10	2010 FIFA World Cup qualification		15,200	
95	6 June 2009	Tehelné pole, Bratislava	A	Slovakia	0–7	2010 FIFA World Cup qualification		6,652	
96	12 August 2009	Ljudski vrt, Maribor	A	Slovenia	0–5	2010 FIFA World Cup qualification		4,400	
97	9 September 2009	Městský fotbalový stadion Miroslava Valenty, Uherské Hradiště	A	Czech Republic	0–7	2010 FIFA World Cup qualification		8,121	
98	14 October 2009	Stadio Olimpico, Serravalle	H	Slovenia	0–3	2010 FIFA World Cup qualification		1,745	
99	3 September 2010	Stadio Olimpico, Serravalle	H	Netherlands	0–5	UEFA Euro 2012 qualifying		4,127	
100	7 September 2010	Stadion, Malmö	A	Sweden	0–6	UEFA Euro 2012 qualifying		21,083	
101	8 October 2010	Ferenc Puskás Stadium, Budapest	A	Hungary	0–8	UEFA Euro 2012 qualifying		10,596	
102	12 October 2010	Stadio Olimpico, Serravalle	H	Moldova	0–2	UEFA Euro 2012 qualifying		714	
103	17 November 2010	Helsinki Olympic Stadium, Helsinki	A	Finland	0–8	UEFA Euro 2012 qualifying		8,192	
104	9 February 2011	Stadio Olimpico, Serravalle	H	Liechtenstein	0–1	Friendly		147	
105	3 June 2011	Stadio Olimpico, Serravalle	H	Finland	0–1	UEFA Euro 2012 qualifying		1,218	
106	7 June 2011	Stadio Olimpico, Serravalle	H	Hungary	0–3	UEFA Euro 2012 qualifying		1,915	
107	10 August 2011	Stadio Olimpico, Serravalle	H	Romania	0–1	Friendly		3,000	
108	2 September 2011	Philips Stadion, Eindhoven	A	Netherlands	0–11	UEFA Euro 2012 qualifying		35,000	
109	6 September 2011	Stadio Olimpico, Serravalle	H	Sweden	0–5	UEFA Euro 2012 qualifying		2,946	
110	11 October 2011	Zimbru Stadium, Chișinău	A	Moldova	0–4	UEFA Euro 2012 qualifying		6,534	
111	14 August 2012	Stadio Olimpico, Serravalle	H	Malta	2–3	Friendly	Marani, Rinaldi	—	
112	11 September 2012	Stadio Olimpico, Serravalle	H	Montenegro	0–6	2014 FIFA World Cup qualification		1,947	
113	12 October 2012	Wembley Stadium, London	A	England	0–5	2014 FIFA World Cup qualification		85,654	
114	16 October 2012	Stadio Olimpico, Serravalle	H	Moldova	0–2	2014 FIFA World Cup qualification		736	
115	14 November 2012	Podgorica City Stadium, Podgorica	A	Montenegro	0–3	2014 FIFA World Cup qualification		7,158	
116	22 March 2013	Stadio Olimpico, Serravalle	H	England	0–8	2014 FIFA World Cup qualification		4,952	
117	26 March 2013	Stadion Narodowy, Warsaw	A	Poland	0–5	2014 FIFA World Cup qualification		43,008	
118	31 May 2013	Stadio Renato Dall'Ara, Bologna	A	Italy	0–4	Friendly		24,804	
119	6 September 2013	Arena Lviv, Lviv	A	Ukraine	0–9	2014 FIFA World Cup qualification		34,190	
120	10 September 2013	Stadio Olimpico, Serravalle	H	Poland	1–5	2014 FIFA World Cup qualification	A. Della Valle	1,597	
121	11 October 2013	Zimbru Stadium, Chișinău	A	Moldova	0–3	2014 FIFA World Cup qualification		7,348	
122	15 October 2013	Stadio Olimpico, Serravalle	H	Ukraine	0–8	2014 FIFA World Cup qualification		1,268	
123	8 June 2014	Stadio Olimpico, Serravalle	H	Albania	0–3	Friendly		1,920	
124	8 September 2014	San Marino Stadium, Serravalle	H	Lithuania	0–2	UEFA Euro 2016 qualifying		986	
125	9 October 2014	Wembley Stadium, London	A	England	0–5	UEFA Euro 2016 qualifying		55,990	
126	14 October 2014	San Marino Stadium, Serravalle	H	Switzerland	0–4	UEFA Euro 2016 qualifying		2,289	
127	15 November 2014	San Marino Stadium, Serravalle	H	Estonia	0–0	UEFA Euro 2016 qualifying		759	
128	27 March 2015	Stožice Stadium, Ljubljana	A	Slovenia	0–6	UEFA Euro 2016 qualifying		8,325	
129	31 March 2015	Sportpark Eschen-Mauren, Eschen	A	Liechtenstein	0–1	Friendly		450	
130	14 June 2015	Lilleküla Stadium, Tallinn	A	Estonia	0–2	UEFA Euro 2016 qualifying		6,131	
131	5 September 2015	San Marino Stadium, Serravalle	H	England	0–6	UEFA Euro 2016 qualifying		4,378	
132	8 September 2015	LFF Stadium, Vilnius	A	Lithuania	1–2	UEFA Euro 2016 qualifying	Vitaioli	2,856	
133	9 October 2015	AFG Arena, St. Gallen	A	Switzerland	0–7	UEFA Euro 2016 qualifying		16,200	
134	12 October 2015	San Marino Stadium, Serravalle	H	Slovenia	0–2	UEFA Euro 2016 qualifying		781	
135	4 June 2016	Stadion Rujevica, Rijeka	A	Croatia	0–10	Friendly		3,603	
136	4 September 2016	San Marino Stadium, Serravalle	H	Azerbaijan	0–1	2018 FIFA World Cup qualification		886	
137	8 October 2016	Windsor Park, Belfast	A	Northern Ireland	0–4	2018 FIFA World Cup qualification		18,234	
138	11 October 2016	Ullevaal Stadion, Oslo	A	Norway	1–4	2018 FIFA World Cup qualification	Stefanelli	8,214	
139	11 November 2016	San Marino Stadium, Serravalle	H	Germany	0–8	2018 FIFA World Cup qualification		3,851	
140	22 February 2017	San Marino Stadium, Serravalle	H	Andorra	0–2	Friendly		60	
141	19 March 2017	San Marino Stadium, Serravalle	H	Moldova	0–2	Friendly		—	
142	26 March 2017	San Marino Stadium, Serravalle	H	Czech Republic	0–6	2018 FIFA World Cup qualification		1,023	
143	10 June 2017	Stadion Nürnberg, Nuremberg	A	Germany	0–7	2018 FIFA World Cup qualification		32,467	
144	1 September 2017	San Marino Stadium, Serravalle	H	Northern Ireland	0–3	2018 FIFA World Cup qualification		2,544	
145	4 September 2017	Bakcell Arena, Baku	A	Azerbaijan	1–5	2018 FIFA World Cup qualification	Palazzi	6,500	
146	5 October 2017	San Marino Stadium, Serravalle	H	Norway	0–8	2018 FIFA World Cup qualification		1,922	
147	8 October 2017	Doosan Arena, Plzeň	A	Czech Republic	0–5	2018 FIFA World Cup qualification		5,625	
148	8 September 2018	Dinamo Stadium, Minsk	A	Belarus	0–5	2018–19 UEFA Nations League		13,634	
149	11 September 2018	San Marino Stadium, Serravalle	H	Luxembourg	0–3	2018–19 UEFA Nations League		794	
150	12 October 2018	Zimbru Stadium, Chișinău	A	Moldova	0–2	2018–19 UEFA Nations League		5,242	
151	15 October 2018	Stade Josy Barthel, Luxembourg City	A	Luxembourg	0–3	2018–19 UEFA Nations League		2,876	
152	15 November 2018	San Marino Stadium, Serravalle	H	Moldova	0–1	2018–19 UEFA Nations League		747	
153	18 November 2018	San Marino Stadium, Serravalle	H	Belarus	0–2	2018–19 UEFA Nations League		736	
154	21 March 2019	GSP Stadium, Strovolos	A	Cyprus	0–5	UEFA Euro 2020 qualifying		3,175	
155	24 March 2019	San Marino Stadium, Serravalle	H	Scotland	0–2	UEFA Euro 2020 qualifying		4,077	
156	8 June 2019	Mordovia Arena, Saransk	A	Russia	0–9	UEFA Euro 2020 qualifying		42,241	
157	11 June 2019	Astana Arena, Nur-Sultan	A	Kazakhstan	0–4	UEFA Euro 2020 qualifying		18,652	
158	6 September 2019	San Marino Stadium, Serravalle	H	Belgium	0–4	UEFA Euro 2020 qualifying		2,523	
159	9 September 2019	San Marino Stadium, Serravalle	H	Cyprus	0–4	UEFA Euro 2020 qualifying		662	
160	10 October 2019	King Baudouin Stadium, Brussels	A	Belgium	0–9	UEFA Euro 2020 qualifying		34,504	
161	13 October 2019	Hampden Park, Glasgow	A	Scotland	0–6	UEFA Euro 2020 qualifying		20,699	
162	16 November 2019	San Marino Stadium, Serravalle	H	Kazakhstan	1–3	UEFA Euro 2020 qualifying	Berardi	643	
163	19 November 2019	San Marino Stadium, Serravalle	H	Russia	0–5	UEFA Euro 2020 qualifying		1,604	
164	5 September 2020	Victoria Stadium, Gibraltar	A	Gibraltar	0–1	2020–21 UEFA Nations League		0 (Note: Match played behind closed doors due to the COVID-19 pandemic in Europe.)	
165	8 September 2020	Stadio Romeo Neri, Rimini	H (Note: San Marino played their home match against Liechtenstein during the 2020–21 UEFA Nations League in Rimini, Italy due to the COVID-19 pandemic in San Marino.)	Liechtenstein	0–2	2020–21 UEFA Nations League		0	
166	7 October 2020	Stožice Stadium, Ljubljana	A	Slovenia	0–4	Friendly		500	
167	13 October 2020	Rheinpark Stadion, Vaduz	A	Liechtenstein	0–0	2020–21 UEFA Nations League		178	
168	11 November 2020	San Marino Stadium, Serravalle	H	Latvia	0–3	Friendly		0	
169	14 November 2020	San Marino Stadium, Serravalle	H	Gibraltar	0–0	2020–21 UEFA Nations League		0	
170	25 March 2021	Wembley Stadium, London	A	England	0–5	2022 FIFA World Cup qualification		0	
171	28 March 2021	San Marino Stadium, Serravalle	H	Hungary	0–3	2022 FIFA World Cup qualification		0	
172	31 March 2021	San Marino Stadium, Serravalle	H	Albania	0–2	2022 FIFA World Cup qualification		0	
173	28 May 2021	Sardegna Arena, Cagliari	A	Italy	0–7	Friendly		0	
174	1 June 2021	Fadil Vokrri Stadium, Pristina	A	Kosovo	1–4	Friendly	Tomassini	0	
175	2 September 2021	Estadi Nacional, Andorra la Vella	A	Andorra	0–2	2022 FIFA World Cup qualification		1,400	
176	5 September 2021	San Marino Stadium, Serravalle	H	Poland	1–7	2022 FIFA World Cup qualification	Nanni	500	
177	8 September 2021	Elbasan Arena, Elbasan	A	Albania	0–5	2022 FIFA World Cup qualification		3,850	
178	9 October 2021	Stadion Narodowy, Warsaw	A	Poland	0–5	2022 FIFA World Cup qualification		56,126	
179	12 October 2021	San Marino Stadium, Serravalle	H	Andorra	0–3	2022 FIFA World Cup qualification		243	
180	12 November 2021	Puskás Aréna, Budapest	A	Hungary	0–4	2022 FIFA World Cup qualification		12,800	
181	15 November 2021	San Marino Stadium, Serravalle	H	England	0–10	2022 FIFA World Cup qualification		2,775	
182	25 March 2022	San Marino Stadium, Serravalle	H	Lithuania	1–2	Friendly	Fabbri	—	
183	28 March 2022	Pinatar Arena, San Pedro del Pinatar	N	Cape Verde	0–2	Friendly		—	
184	2 June 2022	Lilleküla Stadium, Tallinn	A	Estonia	0–2	2022–23 UEFA Nations League		3,533	
185	5 June 2022	San Marino Stadium, Serravalle	H	Malta	0–2	2022–23 UEFA Nations League		558	
186	9 June 2022	San Marino Stadium, Serravalle	H	Iceland	0–1	Friendly		293	
187	12 June 2022	National Stadium, Ta' Qali	A	Malta	0–1	2022–23 UEFA Nations League		2,646	
188	21 September 2022	San Marino Stadium, Serravalle	H	Seychelles	0–0	Friendly		367	
189	26 September 2022	San Marino Stadium, Serravalle	H	Estonia	0–4	2022–23 UEFA Nations League		608	
190	17 November 2022	Daren Sammy Cricket Ground, Gros Islet	A	Saint Lucia	1–1	Friendly	Lazzari	750	
191	20 November 2022	Daren Sammy Cricket Ground, Gros Islet	A	Saint Lucia	0–1	Friendly		3,723	
192	23 March 2023	San Marino Stadium, Serravalle	H	Northern Ireland	0–2	UEFA Euro 2024 qualifying		2,099	
193	26 March 2023	Stožice Stadium, Ljubljana	A	Slovenia	0–2	UEFA Euro 2024 qualifying		10,282	
194	16 June 2023	Stadio Ennio Tardini, Parma	H (Note: San Marino played their home match against Kazakhstan during qualifying for UEFA Euro 2024 in Parma, Italy due to the renovation of their regular home stadium, the San Marino Stadium.)	Kazakhstan	0–3	UEFA Euro 2024 qualifying		528	
195	19 June 2023	Helsinki Olympic Stadium, Helsinki	A	Finland	0–6	UEFA Euro 2024 qualifying		32,812	
196	7 September 2023	Parken Stadium, Copenhagen	A	Denmark	0–4	UEFA Euro 2024 qualifying		36,262	
197	10 September 2023	San Marino Stadium, Serravalle	H	Slovenia	0–4	UEFA Euro 2024 qualifying		844	
198	14 October 2023	Windsor Park, Belfast	A	Northern Ireland	0–3	UEFA Euro 2024 qualifying		17,886	
199	17 October 2023	San Marino Stadium, Serravalle	H	Denmark	1–2	UEFA Euro 2024 qualifying	Golinucci	2,984	
200	17 November 2023	Astana Arena, Astana	A	Kazakhstan	1–3	UEFA Euro 2024 qualifying	Franciosi	30,100	
201	20 November 2023	San Marino Stadium, Serravalle	H	Finland	1–2	UEFA Euro 2024 qualifying	Berardi	1,427	
202	20 March 2024	San Marino Stadium, Serravalle	H	Saint Kitts and Nevis	1–3	Friendly	Berardi	622	
203	24 March 2024	San Marino Stadium, Serravalle	H	Saint Kitts and Nevis	0–0	Friendly		473	
204	5 June 2024	Wiener Neustadt Arena, Wiener Neustadt	N	Slovakia	0–4	Friendly		452	
205	11 June 2024	San Marino Stadium, Serravalle	H	Cyprus	1–4	Friendly	Giocondi	358	
206	5 September 2024	San Marino Stadium, Serravalle	H	Liechtenstein	1–0	2024–25 UEFA Nations League	Sensoli	914	
207	10 September 2024	Zimbru Stadium, Chișinău	A	Moldova	0–1	Friendly		4,742	
208	10 October 2024	Europa Sports Park, Gibraltar	A	Gibraltar	0–1	2024–25 UEFA Nations League		677	
209	13 October 2024	Estadi Nacional, Andorra La Vella, Andorra	A	Andorra	0–2	Friendly		—	
210	15 November 2024	San Marino Stadium, Serravalle	H	Gibraltar	1–1	2024–25 UEFA Nations League	Nanni	1,324	
211	18 November 2024	Rheinpark Stadion, Vaduz	A	Liechtenstein	3–1	2024–25 UEFA Nations League	Lazzari, Nanni, Golinucci	1,157	
212	21 March 2025	AEK Arena, Larnaca	A	Cyprus	0–2	2026 FIFA World Cup qualification		2,336	
213	24 March 2025	San Marino Stadium, Serravalle	H	Romania	1–5	2026 FIFA World Cup qualification	Zannoni	3,556	
214	7 June 2025	Bilino Polje Stadium, Zenica	A	Bosnia and Herzegovina	0–1	2026 FIFA World Cup qualification		11,828	
215	10 June 2025	San Marino Stadium, Serravalle	H	Austria	0–4	2026 FIFA World Cup qualification		3,075	
216	6 September 2025	San Marino Stadium, Serravalle	H	Bosnia and Herzegovina	0–6	2026 FIFA World Cup qualification		2,740	
217	9 September 2025	National Stadium, Ta' Qali	A	Malta	1–3	Friendly	Nanni	1,644	
218	9 October 2025	Ernst Happel Stadion, Vienna	A	Austria	0–10	2026 FIFA World Cup qualification		37,500	
219	12 October 2025	San Marino Stadium, Serravalle	H	Cyprus	0–4	2026 FIFA World Cup qualification		598	
220	13 November 2025	Městský stadion, Karviná	A	Czech Republic	0–1	Friendly		3,721	
221	18 November 2025	Ilie Oană Stadium, Ploiești	A	Romania	1–7	2026 FIFA World Cup qualification	N. Giacopetti	8,426	
222	28 March 2026	San Marino Stadium, Serravalle	H	Faroe Islands	1–2	Friendly	N. Giacopetti	320	
223	31 March 2026	San Marino Stadium, Serravalle	H	Andorra	0–0	Friendly		361	
224	5 June 2026	San Marino Stadium, Serravalle	H	Bangladesh	1–2	Friendly	N. Giacopetti	2,934	
225	9 June 2026	Haladás Sportkomplexum, Szombathely	N	Azerbaijan	1–2	Friendly	Nanni	100	
226	26 September 2026	San Marino Stadium, Serravalle	H	Finland	0–7	2026-27 UEFA Nations League		1,148	
227	29 September 2026	San Marino Stadium, Serravalle	H	Albania	0–3	2026-27 UEFA Nations League		3,402	
228	3 October 2026	Illovszky Rudolf Stadion, Budapest	A	Belarus	0–4	2026-27 UEFA Nations League		0	
229	6 October 2026	Arena Kombëtare, Tirana	A	Albania	1–2	2026-27 UEFA Nations League	Lazzari	16,240	
230	12 November 2026	San Marino Stadium, Serravalle	H	Belarus	0–2	2026-27 UEFA Nations League		365	
231	15 November 2026	Olympic Stadium, Helsinki	A	Finland	2–7	2026-27 UEFA Nations League	Nanni (2)	7,153	

== Unofficial matches ==
San Marino's score is shown first in each case.

San Marino national football team unofficial match results
Date	Venue	Opponents	Score	Competition	San Marino scorers	Att.	Ref.
12 March 1986	Stadio Olimpico, Serravalle (H)	(Denmark) OB Odense	1–1	Friendly	Gasperoni	—	
28 March 1986	Stadio Olimpico, Serravalle (H)	Canada U23	0–1	Friendly		—	
16 September 1987	Al-Hamadaniah Stadium, Aleppo (N)	Lebanon	0–0	1987 Mediterranean Games		—	
18 September 1987	Al-Hamadaniah Stadium, Aleppo (N)	Syria	0–3	1987 Mediterranean Games		—	
20 September 1987	Al-Hamadaniah Stadium, Aleppo (N)	Turkey Olympic	0–4	1987 Mediterranean Games		—	
30 July 2014	Stadio Fonte Dell'Ovo, San Marino (H)	(Italy) AC Bellaria Igea Marina	2–0	Friendly	Hirsch, Golinucci	—	
2 August 2014	Stadio Olimpico, Serravalle (A)	San Marino Calcio	1–1	Friendly	Berretti	—	
16 August 2016		(Italy) Santarcangelo Calcio	1–1	Friendly	Stefanelli	—	
31 May 2017	Stadio Carlo Castellani, Empoli (A)	Italy	0–8	Friendly		6,000	
8 August 2018	stadio Comunale Santamonica, Misano (A)	Italy U20	0–4	Friendly		—	
6 June 2021	Stadio Olimpico, Serravalle (H)	Italy U20	0–1	Friendly		400	
2 August 2025	Stadio Comunale, Fanano (A)	(Italy) Modena FC	1–4	Friendly	G. Capicchioni	—	

== Record by opponent ==
Team	Pld	W	D	L	GF	GA	GD	WPCT
Albania	6	0	0	6	1	18	−17	0.00
Andorra	5	0	1	4	0	9	−9	0.00
Austria	4	0	0	4	1	25	−24	0.00
Azerbaijan	3	0	0	3	2	8	−6	0.00
Bangladesh	1	0	0	1	1	2	−1	0.00
Belarus	4	0	0	4	0	13	−13	0.00
Belgium	8	0	0	8	3	46	−43	0.00
Bosnia and Herzegovina	4	0	0	4	1	13	−12	0.00
Bulgaria	2	0	0	2	0	7	−7	0.00
Cape Verde	1	0	0	1	0	2	−2	0.00
Croatia	3	0	0	3	0	18	−18	0.00
Cyprus	9	0	0	9	1	28	−27	0.00
Czech Republic	7	0	0	7	0	32	−32	0.00
Denmark	2	0	0	2	1	6	−5	0.00
England	8	0	0	8	1	52	−51	0.00
Estonia	5	0	1	4	0	9	−9	0.00
Faroe Islands	3	0	0	3	2	8	−6	0.00
Finland	8	0	0	8	4	37	−33	0.00
Germany	4	0	0	4	0	34	−34	0.00
Gibraltar	4	0	2	2	1	3	−2	0.00
Greece	2	0	0	2	0	6	−6	0.00
Hungary	6	0	0	6	0	26	−26	0.00
Iceland	1	0	0	1	0	1	−1	0.00
Israel	2	0	0	2	0	12	−12	0.00
Italy	3	0	0	3	0	15	−15	0.00
Kazakhstan	4	0	0	4	2	13	−11	0.00
Kosovo	1	0	0	1	1	4	−3	0.00
Latvia	5	0	1	4	1	9	−8	0.00
Liechtenstein	8	3	2	3	7	7	0	37.50
Lithuania	5	0	0	5	2	11	−9	0.00
Luxembourg	2	0	0	2	0	6	−6	0.00
Malta	4	0	0	4	3	9	−6	0.00
Moldova	9	0	0	9	0	18	−18	0.00
Montenegro	2	0	0	2	0	9	−9	0.00
Netherlands	6	0	0	6	0	39	−39	0.00
Northern Ireland	6	0	0	6	0	19	−19	0.00
Norway	4	0	0	4	1	24	−23	0.00
Poland	10	0	0	10	2	45	−43	0.00
Republic of Ireland	2	0	0	2	1	7	−6	0.00
Romania	5	0	0	5	3	22	−19	0.00
Russia	4	0	0	4	0	25	−25	0.00
Saint Kitts and Nevis	2	0	1	1	1	3	−2	0.00
Saint Lucia	2	0	1	1	1	2	−1	0.00
Scotland	8	0	0	8	0	27	−27	0.00
Serbia and Montenegro	2	0	0	2	0	8	−8	0.00
Seychelles	1	0	1	0	0	0	0	0.00
Slovakia	5	0	0	5	1	26	−25	0.00
Slovenia	7	0	0	7	0	26	−26	0.00
Spain	4	0	0	4	0	26	−26	0.00
Sweden	4	0	0	4	0	22	−22	0.00
Switzerland	4	0	0	4	0	22	−22	0.00
Turkey	4	0	1	3	1	16	−15	0.00
Ukraine	2	0	0	2	0	17	−17	0.00
Wales	4	0	0	4	1	16	−15	0.00
Total	231	3	11	217	47	908	−861	1.30

Source: Results
