= 1994 FIFA World Cup qualification – UEFA Group 5 =

Football tournament qualification stage

The qualification matches for Group 5 of the European zone (UEFA) of the 1994 FIFA World Cup qualification tournament took place between May 1992 and November 1993. The teams competed on a home-and-away basis with the winner and runner-up claiming 2 of the 12 spots in the final tournament allocated to the European zone. The group consisted of Greece, Hungary, Iceland, Luxembourg, Russia, and Yugoslavia.

In October 1992, FIFA suspended Yugoslavia as a result of the United Nations sanctions against that country stemming from the Yugoslav wars.

At the time the draw was made on 8 December 1991, the Soviet Union, which competed at UEFA Euro 1992 as the Commonwealth of Independent States, fell apart and the Russian Federation, one of its union republics, was recognized as its successor. Following the USSR's dissolution, Ukraine proposed to arrange a separate tournament for all successors of the Soviet Union. Georgia and Armenia supported the proposal, but Russia blocked it. The final decision on succession was taken on 1 June 1992 at the FIFA Executive Committee meeting in Stockholm.

== Standings ==
Pos	Team	Pld	W	D	L	GF	GA	GD	Pts	Qualification	Greece national football team	Russia national football team	Iceland national football team	Hungary national football team	Luxembourg national football team	Serbia and Montenegro national football team
1	Greece	8	6	2	0	10	2	+8	14	Qualification to 1994 FIFA World Cup	—	1–0	1–0	0–0	2–0	–
2	Russia	8	5	2	1	15	4	+11	12	Qualification to 1994 FIFA World Cup	1–1	—	1–0	3–0	2–0	–
3	Iceland	8	3	2	3	7	6	+1	8		0–1	1–1	—	2–0	1–0	–
4	Hungary	8	2	1	5	6	11	−5	5		0–1	1–3	1–2	—	1–0	–
5	Luxembourg	8	0	1	7	2	17	−15	1		1–3	0–4	1–1	0–3	—	–
6	FR Yugoslavia	0	0	0	0	0	0	0	0	Suspended due to UN Sanctions	–	–	–	–	–	—

=== Results ===
13 May 1992

Greece	1 – 0	Iceland
Sofianopoulos 25'	Report

Olympic Stadium, Athens
Attendance: 2,874
Referee: Karl-Josef Assenmacher (Germany)

3 June 1992

Hungary	1 – 2	Iceland
K. Kovács 3'	Report	Orlygsson 51'; Magnússon 73'

Népstadion, Budapest
Attendance: 11,000
Referee: Angelo Amendolia (Italy)

9 September 1992

Luxembourg	0 – 3	Hungary
	Report	Détári 15'; K. Kovács 53', 78'

Josy Barthel Stadium, Luxembourg City
Attendance: 3,026
Referee: Loizos Loizou (Cyprus)

7 October 1992

Iceland	0 – 1	Greece
	Report	P. Tsalouchidis 61'

Laugardalsvöllur, Reykjavík
Attendance: 4,973
Referee: Howard King (Wales)

14 October 1992

Russia	1 – 0	Iceland
Yuran 65'	Report

Luzhniki Stadium, Moscow
Attendance: 18,000
Referee: Lube Spasov (Bulgaria)

28 October 1992

Russia	2 – 0	Luxembourg
Yuran 5'; Radchenko 24'	Report

Luzhniki Stadium, Moscow
Attendance: 1,750
Referee: Ilkka Koho (Finland)

11 November 1992

Greece	0 – 0	Hungary
	Report

Kaftanzoglio Stadium, Thessaloniki
Attendance: 35,367
Referee: Philip Don (England)

17 February 1993

Greece	2 – 0	Luxembourg
Dimitriadis 30' (pen.); Mitropoulos 65'	Report

Olympic Stadium, Athens
Attendance: 36,256
Referee: Václav Krondl (Czech Republic)

31 March 1993

Hungary	0 – 1	Greece
	Report	Apostolakis 70' (pen.)

Népstadion, Budapest
Attendance: 20,000
Referee: Hellmut Krug (Germany)

14 April 1993

Luxembourg	0 – 4	Russia
	Report	Kiriakov 11', 46'; Shalimov 58'; Kulkov 90'

Municipal, Luxembourg City
Attendance: 3,180
Referee: Alan Snoddy (Northern Ireland)

28 April 1993

Russia	3 – 0	Hungary
Kanchelskis 55'; Kolyvanov 60'; Yuran 85'	Report

Luzhniki Stadium, Moscow
Attendance: 25,000
Referee: Guy Goethals (Belgium)

20 May 1993

Luxembourg	1 – 1	Iceland
Birgisson 70' (o.g.)	Report	Gudjohnsen 40'

Municipal, Luxembourg City
Attendance: 1,965
Referee: Jorge Monteiro Coroado (Portugal)
23 May 1993

Russia	1 – 1	Greece
Dobrovolski 70' (pen.)	Report	Mitropoulos 45'

Luzhniki Stadium, Moscow
Attendance: 35,000
Referee: Peter Mikkelsen (Denmark)

2 June 1993

Iceland	1 – 1	Russia
Sverrisson 25'	Report	Kiriakov 38'

Laugardalsvöllur, Reykjavík
Attendance: 3,308
Referee: Leslie Mottram (Scotland)

16 June 1993

Iceland	2 – 0	Hungary
Sverrisson 13'; Gudjohnsen 77'	Report

Laugardalsvöllur, Reykjavík
Attendance: 2,755
Referee: Rémi Harrel (France)

8 September 1993

Hungary	1 – 3	Russia
Klausz 20'	Report	Piatnitski 14'; Kiriakov 53'; Borodiuk 89'

Üllői úti Stadion, Budapest
Attendance: 6,000
Referee: Gheorghe Constantin (Romania)
8 September 1993

Iceland	1 – 0	Luxembourg
Ingólfsson 61'	Report

Laugardalsvöllur, Reykjavík
Attendance: 3,969
Referee: Nemus Djurhuus (Faroe Islands)

12 October 1993

Luxembourg	1 – 3	Greece
Fanelli 82'	Report	Machlas 31'; Apostolakis 63'; Saravakos 71'

Municipal, Luxembourg City
Attendance: 2,538
Referee: Andrew Waddell (Scotland)

27 October 1993

Hungary	1 – 0	Luxembourg
Détári 20'	Report

Üllői úti Stadion, Budapest
Attendance: 1,500
Referee: Oğuz Sarvan (Turkey)

17 November 1993

Greece	1 – 0	Russia
Machlas 69'	Report

Olympic Stadium, Athens
Attendance: 40,151
Referee: Jean-Fidèle Diramba (Gabon)

== Goalscorers ==
4 goals

- (Russia) Sergei Kiriakov

3 goals

- (Hungary) Kálmán Kovács
- (Russia) Sergei Yuran

2 goals

- (Greece) Stratos Apostolakis
- (Greece) Nikos Machlas
- (Greece) Tasos Mitropoulos
- (Hungary) Lajos Détári
- (Iceland) Arnór Guðjohnsen
- (Iceland) Eyjólfur Sverrisson

1 goal

- (Greece) Vasilis Dimitriadis
- (Greece) Dimitris Saravakos
- (Greece) Panagiotis Sofianopoulos
- (Greece) Panagiotis Tsalouchidis
- (Hungary) László Klausz
- (Iceland) Haraldur Ingólfsson
- (Iceland) Hörður Magnússon
- (Iceland) Þorvaldur Örlygsson
- (Luxembourg) Stefano Fanelli
- (Russia) Aleksandr Borodiuk
- (Russia) Igor Dobrovolski
- (Russia) Andrei Kanchelskis
- (Russia) Igor Kolyvanov
- (Russia) Vasili Kulkov
- (Russia) Andrei Piatnitski
- (Russia) Dmitri Radchenko
- (Russia) Igor Shalimov

1 own goal

- (Iceland) Hlynur Birgisson (playing against Luxembourg)
