= 1994 FIFA World Cup qualification – UEFA Group 2 =

The qualification matches for Group 2 of the European zone (UEFA) of the 1994 FIFA World Cup qualification tournament took place between September 1992 and November 1993. The teams competed on a home-and-away basis with the winner and runner-up claiming 2 of the 12 spots in the final tournament allocated to the European zone. The group consisted of England, Netherlands, Norway, Poland, San Marino, and Turkey.

== Standings ==
Pos	Team	Pld	W	D	L	GF	GA	GD	Pts	Qualification	Norway national football team	Netherlands national football team	England national football team	Poland national football team	Turkey national football team	San Marino national football team
1	Norway	10	7	2	1	25	5	+20	16	Qualification to 1994 FIFA World Cup	—	2–1	2–0	1–0	3–1	10–0
2	Netherlands	10	6	3	1	29	9	+20	15	Qualification to 1994 FIFA World Cup	0–0	—	2–0	2–2	3–1	6–0
3	England	10	5	3	2	26	9	+17	13		1–1	2–2	—	3–0	4–0	6–0
4	Poland	10	3	2	5	10	15	−5	8		0–3	1–3	1–1	—	1–0	1–0
5	Turkey	10	3	1	6	11	19	−8	7		2–1	1–3	0–2	2–1	—	4–1
6	San Marino	10	0	1	9	2	46	−44	1		0–2	0–7	1–7	0–3	0–0	—

=== Results ===
9 September 1992

Norway	10–0	San Marino
Rekdal 4', 79'; Halle 6', 53', 70'; Sørloth 15', 22'; Nilsen 46', 67'; Mykland 74'	Report

Ullevaal, Oslo
Attendance: 6,511
Referee: Esa Palsi (Finland)

23 September 1992

Norway	2–1	Netherlands
Rekdal 9' (pen.); Sørloth 78'	Report	Bergkamp 10'

Ullevaal, Oslo
Attendance: 19,998
Referee: Rémi Harrel (France)
23 September 1992

Poland	1–0	Turkey
Wałdoch 33'	Report

Miejski, Poznań
Attendance: 12,000
Referee: Markus Merk (Germany)

7 October 1992

San Marino	0–2	Norway
	Report	Jakobsen 7'; Flo 19'

Stadio Olimpico, Serravalle
Attendance: 1,187
Referee: Juan Ansuátegui Roca (Spain)

14 October 1992

England	1–1	Norway
Platt 55'	Report	Rekdal 77'

Wembley Stadium, London
Attendance: 51,441
Referee: Arturo Brizio Carter (Mexico)
14 October 1992

Netherlands	2–2	Poland
Van Vossen 43', 48'	Report	Koźmiński 19'; Kowalczyk 21'

De Kuip, Rotterdam
Attendance: 14,500
Referee: Arcangelo Pezzella (Italy)

28 October 1992

Turkey	4–1	San Marino
Hakan 37', 89'; Orhan 87'; Hami 90'	Report	Bacciocchi 53'

19 Mayıs, Ankara
Attendance: 22,303
Referee: Ali Bujsaim (United Arab Emirates)

18 November 1992

England	4–0	Turkey
Gascoigne 16', 61'; Shearer 28'; Pearce 60'	Report

Wembley Stadium, London
Attendance: 42,984
Referee: Bo Karlsson (Sweden)

16 December 1992

Turkey	1–3	Netherlands
Feyyaz 61'	Report	Van Vossen 57', 87'; Gullit 59'

İnönü, Istanbul
Attendance: 7,585
Referee: Kurt Röthlisberger (Switzerland)

17 February 1993

England	6–0	San Marino
Platt 13', 24', 67', 83'; Palmer 78'; Ferdinand 86'	Report

Wembley Stadium, London
Attendance: 51,154
Referee: Roger Philippi (Luxembourg)

24 February 1993

Netherlands	3–1	Turkey
Overmars 4'; Witschge 37', 57'	Report	Feyyaz 36' (pen.)

Galgenwaard, Utrecht
Attendance: 13,000
Referee: Antonio Martin Navarrete (Spain)

10 March 1993

San Marino	0–0	Turkey
	Report

Stadio Olimpico, Serravalle
Attendance: 957
Referee: Michel Piraux (Belgium)

24 March 1993

Netherlands	6–0	San Marino
Van den Brom 2'; Canti 29' (o.g.) de Wolf 52', 85'; R. de Boer 68' (pen.); Van Vossen 78'	Report

Galgenwaard, Utrecht
Attendance: 12,500
Referee: Gerd Grabher (Austria)

31 March 1993

Turkey	0–2	England
	Report	Platt 7'; Gascoigne 45'

Kemal Atatürk Stadium, İzmir
Attendance: 35,000
Referee: Fabio Baldas (Italy)

28 April 1993

England	2–2	Netherlands
Barnes 2'; Platt 23'	Report	Bergkamp 34'; Van Vossen 85' (pen.)

Wembley Stadium, London
Attendance: 73,163
Referee: Peter Mikkelsen (Denmark)
28 April 1993

Norway	3–1	Turkey
Rekdal 14' (pen.); Fjørtoft 17'; Jakobsen 55'	Report	Feyyaz 57'

Ullevaal, Oslo
Attendance: 21,530
Referee: Hans-Jürgen Weber (Germany)
28 April 1993

Poland	1–0	San Marino
Furtok 70'	Report

Stadion Widzewa, Łódź
Attendance: 20,000
Referee: Leslie Mottram (Scotland)

19 May 1993

San Marino	0–3	Poland
	Report	Leśniak 52', 80'; K. Warzycha 56'

Stadio Olimpico, Serravalle
Attendance: 1,223
Referee: Plarent Kotherja (Albania)

29 May 1993

Poland	1–1	England
Adamczuk 36'	Report	I. Wright 84'

Silesian Stadium, Chorzów
Attendance: 60,000
Referee: Serge Muhmenthaler (Switzerland)

2 June 1993

Norway	2–0	England
Leonhardsen 43'; Bohinen 48'	Report

Ullevaal, Oslo
Attendance: 22,256
Referee: Sándor Puhl (Hungary)

9 June 1993

Netherlands	0–0	Norway
	Report

De Kuip, Rotterdam
Attendance: 42,600
Referee: Vassilios Nikakis (Greece)

8 September 1993

England	3–0	Poland
Ferdinand 5'; Gascoigne 49'; Pearce 53'	Report

Wembley Stadium, London
Attendance: 71,220
Referee: Frans Van den Wijngaert (Belgium)

22 September 1993

Norway	1–0	Poland
Flo 55'	Report

Ullevaal Stadion, Oslo
Attendance: 21,968
Referee: Pierluigi Pairetto (Italy)
22 September 1993

San Marino	0–7	Netherlands
	Report	Bosman 1', 66', 76'; Jonk 21', 43'; R. de Boer 51'; R. Koeman 79' (pen.)

Stadio Renato Dall'Ara, Bologna
Attendance: 3,340
Referee: Charles Agius (Malta)

13 October 1993

Netherlands	2–0	England
R. Koeman 62'; Bergkamp 68'	Report

De Kuip, Rotterdam
Attendance: 48,000
Referee: Karl-Josef Assenmacher (Germany)
13 October 1993

Poland	0–3	Norway
	Report	Flo 61'; Fjørtoft 63'; Johnsen 89'

Miejski, Poznań
Attendance: 11,000
Referee: Václav Krondl (Czech Republic)

27 October 1993

Turkey	2–1	Poland
Hakan 52'; K. Bülent 67'	Report	Kowalczyk 18'

İnönü, Istanbul
Attendance: 8,326
Referee: Alfred Wieser (Austria)

10 November 1993

Turkey	2–1	Norway
Ertuğrul 5', 26'	Report	Bohinen 48'

Şükrü Saracoğlu Stadium, Istanbul
Attendance: 12,000
Referee: Sergei Khusainov (Russia)

17 November 1993

Poland	1–3	Netherlands
Leśniak 14'	Report	Bergkamp 10', 56'; R. de Boer 88'

Miejski, Poznań
Attendance: 17,000
Referee: Leif Sundell (Sweden)
17 November 1993

San Marino	1–7	England
Gualtieri 1'	Report	Ince 22', 73'; I. Wright 34', 46', 78', 90'; Ferdinand 38'

Stadio Renato Dall'Ara, Bologna
Attendance: 2,378
Referee: Abdullah Mohamed Nazri (Malaysia)

== Goal scorers ==
7 goals

- (England) David Platt

6 goals

- (Netherlands) Peter van Vossen

5 goals

- (England) Ian Wright
- (Netherlands) Dennis Bergkamp
- (Norway) Kjetil Rekdal

4 goals

- (England) Paul Gascoigne

3 goals

- (England) Les Ferdinand
- (Netherlands) John Bosman
- (Netherlands) Ronald de Boer
- (Norway) Jostein Flo
- (Norway) Gunnar Halle
- (Norway) Gøran Sørloth
- (Poland) Marek Leśniak
- (Turkey) Feyyaz Uçar
- (Turkey) Hakan Şükür

2 goals

- (England) Paul Ince
- (England) Stuart Pearce
- (Netherlands) John de Wolf
- (Netherlands) Wim Jonk
- (Netherlands) Ronald Koeman
- (Netherlands) Rob Witschge
- (Norway) Lars Bohinen
- (Norway) Jan Åge Fjørtoft
- (Norway) Mini Jakobsen
- (Norway) Roger Nilsen
- (Poland) Wojciech Kowalczyk
- (Turkey) Ertuğrul Sağlam

1 goal

- (England) John Barnes
- (England) Carlton Palmer
- (England) Alan Shearer
- (Netherlands) Ruud Gullit
- (Netherlands) Marc Overmars
- (Netherlands) John van den Brom
- (Norway) Ronny Johnsen
- (Norway) Øyvind Leonhardsen
- (Norway) Erik Mykland
- (Poland) Dariusz Adamczuk
- (Poland) Marek Koźmiński
- (Poland) Jan Furtok
- (Poland) Tomasz Wałdoch
- (Poland) Krzysztof Warzycha
- (San Marino) Davide Gualtieri
- (San Marino) Nicola Bacciocchi
- (Turkey) Bülent Korkmaz
- (Turkey) Hami Mandıralı
- (Turkey) Orhan Çıkırıkçı

1 own goal

- (San Marino) Claudio Canti (playing against the Netherlands)

== See also ==
- An Impossible Job
