= 1994 FIFA World Cup qualification – UEFA Group 6 =

Group 6 qualification for the 1994 FIFA World Cup

The qualification matches for Group 6 of the European zone (UEFA) of the 1994 FIFA World Cup qualification tournament took place between May 1992 and November 1993. The teams competed on a home-and-away basis with the winner and runner-up claiming 2 of the 12 spots in the final tournament allocated to the European zone. The group consisted of Austria, Bulgaria, Finland, France, Israel, and Sweden.

== Standings ==
Pos	Team	Pld	W	D	L	GF	GA	GD	Pts	Qualification	Sweden men's national football team	Bulgaria national football team	France national football team	Austria national football team	Finland national football team	Israel national football team
1	Sweden	10	6	3	1	19	8	+11	15	Qualification to 1994 FIFA World Cup	—	2–0	1–1	1–0	3–2	5–0
2	Bulgaria	10	6	2	2	19	10	+9	14	Qualification to 1994 FIFA World Cup	1–1	—	2–0	4–1	2–0	2–2
3	France	10	6	1	3	17	10	+7	13		2–1	1–2	—	2–0	2–1	2–3
4	Austria	10	3	2	5	15	16	−1	8		1–1	3–1	0–1	—	3–0	5–2
5	Finland	10	2	1	7	9	18	−9	5		0–1	0–3	0–2	3–1	—	0–0
6	Israel	10	1	3	6	10	27	−17	5		1–3	0–2	0–4	1–1	1–3	—

=== Results ===
14 May 1992

Finland	0–3	Bulgaria
	Report	Balakov 62'; Kostadinov 73', 87'

Olympiastadion, Helsinki
Attendance: 8,602
Referee: Dušan Colić (FR Yugoslavia)

9 September 1992

Bulgaria	2–0	France
Stoichkov 21' (pen.); Balakov 29'	Report

Vasil Levski National Stadium, Sofia
Attendance: 41,000
Referee: Sándor Puhl (Hungary)
9 September 1992

Finland	0–1	Sweden
	Report	Ingesson 77' (pen.)

Olympiastadion, Helsinki
Attendance: 13,617
Referee: Vadim Zhuk (Belarus)

7 October 1992

Sweden	2–0	Bulgaria
Dahlin 56'; Pettersson 76'	Report

Råsunda Stadium, Solna
Attendance: 20,625
Referee: John Blankenstein (Netherlands)
14 October 1992

France	2–0	Austria
Papin 3'; Cantona 77'	Report

Parc des Princes, Paris
Attendance: 39,186
Referee: Vadim Zhuk (Belarus)

28 October 1992

Austria	5–2	Israel
Herzog 41', 46'; Polster 49'; Stöger 56'; A. Ogris 87'	Report	Zohar 53', 77'

Prater Stadium, Vienna
Attendance: 12,000
Referee: João Pinto Correia (Portugal)

11 November 1992

Israel	1–3	Sweden
Banin 42'	Report	Limpar 37'; Dahlin 58'; Ingesson 74'

Ramat Gan Stadium, Ramat Gan
Attendance: 25,230
Referee: Serge Muhmenthaler (Switzerland)
14 November 1992

France	2–1	Finland
Papin 18'; Cantona 31'	Report	Järvinen 54'

Parc des Princes, Paris
Attendance: 28,630
Referee: Jozef Marko (Czechoslovakia)

2 December 1992

Israel	0–2	Bulgaria
	Report	Sirakov 56'; Penev 83'

Ramat Gan Stadium, Ramat Gan
Attendance: 15,000
Referee: Vassilios Nikakis (Greece)

17 February 1993

Israel	0–4	France
	Report	Cantona 28'; Blanc 62', 84'; Roche 89'

Ramat Gan Stadium, Ramat Gan
Attendance: 26,000
Referee: Ryszard Wójcik (Poland)

27 March 1993

Austria	0–1	France
	Report	Papin 58'

Ernst Happel Stadium, Vienna
Attendance: 37,837
Referee: John Blankenstein (Netherlands)

14 April 1993

Austria	3–1	Bulgaria
Pfeifenberger 8'; Kuhbauer 25'; Polster 89'	Report	Ivanov 54'

Ernst Happel Stadium, Vienna
Attendance: 19,500
Referee: Sergei Khusainov (Russia)

28 April 1993

France	2–1	Sweden
Cantona 42' (pen.), 81'	Report	Dahlin 14'

Parc des Princes, Paris
Attendance: 34,134
Referee: Pierluigi Pairetto (Italy)
28 April 1993

Bulgaria	2–0	Finland
Stoichkov 15' (pen.); Yankov 43'	Report

Vasil Levski National Stadium, Sofia
Attendance: 20,000
Referee: Lim Kee Chong (Mauritius)

12 May 1993

Bulgaria	2–2	Israel
Stoichkov 35' (pen.); Sirakov 60'	Report	R. Harazi 52'; Rosenthal 53'

Vasil Levski National Stadium, Sofia
Attendance: 25,000
Referee: Ahmet Çakar (Turkey)
13 May 1993

Finland	3–1	Austria
Paatelainen 17'; Rajamäki 20'; Hjelm 52'	Report	Zisser 89'

Paavo Nurmi Stadium, Turku
Attendance: 13,682
Referee: John Ferry (Northern Ireland)

19 May 1993

Sweden	1–0	Austria
J. Eriksson 50'	Report

Råsunda Stadium, Solna
Attendance: 27,775
Referee: Michel Piraux (Belgium)

2 June 1993

Sweden	5–0	Israel
Brolin 17', 41', 65'; Zetterberg 55'; Landberg 89'	Report

Råsunda Stadium, Solna
Attendance: 22,042
Referee: Sergei Khusainov (Russia)

16 June 1993

Finland	0–0	Israel
	Report

Lahti Stadium, Lahti
Attendance: 4,620
Referee: Volodymyr Pyanykh (Ukraine)

22 August 1993

Sweden	1–1	France
Dahlin 89'	Report	Sauzee 77'

Råsunda Stadium, Solna
Attendance: 30,530
Referee: Aron Schmidhuber (Germany)
25 August 1993

Austria	3–0	Finland
Kühbauer 26'; Pfeifenberger 41'; Herzog 89' (pen.)	Report

Ernst Happel Stadium, Vienna
Attendance: 21,000
Referee: Michał Listkiewicz (Poland)

8 September 1993

Finland	0–2	France
	Report	Blanc 47'; Papin 55' (pen.)

Ratina Stadium, Tampere
Attendance: 7,200
Referee: Stephen Lodge (England)
8 September 1993

Bulgaria	1–1	Sweden
Stoichkov 21' (pen.)	Report	Dahlin 26'

Vasil Levski National Stadium, Sofia
Attendance: 36,000
Referee: Ryszard Wójcik (Poland)

13 October 1993

France	2–3	Israel
Sauzée 32'; Ginola 43'	Report	R. Harazi 21'; Berkovich 83'; Atar 90'

Parc des Princes, Paris
Attendance: 32,700
Referee: Alan Snoddy (Northern Ireland)
13 October 1993

Bulgaria	4–1	Austria
Penev 6', 67'; Stoichkov 33' (pen.); Letchkov 86'	Report	Herzog 51'

Vasil Levski National Stadium, Sofia
Attendance: 22,500
Referee: Marcello Nicchi (Italy)
13 October 1993

Sweden	3–2	Finland
Dahlin 27', 46'; Larsson 40'	Report	Suominen 14'; Litmanen 60'

Råsunda Stadium, Solna
Attendance: 30,177
Referee: Ahmet Çakar (Turkey)

27 October 1993

Israel	1–1	Austria
Rosenthal 3'	Report	Reinmayr 15'

Ramat Gan Stadium, Ramat Gan
Attendance: 23,500
Referee: László Vágner (Hungary)

10 November 1993

Austria	1–1	Sweden
Herzog 70'	Report	Mild 67'

Ernst Happel Stadium, Vienna
Attendance: 25,000
Referee: Manuel Díaz Vega (Spain)
10 November 1993

Israel	1–3	Finland
R. Harazi 90'	Report	Hyryläinen 54'; Paavola 72'; Hjelm 85'

Ramat Gan Stadium, Ramat Gan
Attendance: 10,000
Referee: Daniel Roduit (Switzerland)
17 November 1993

France	1–2	Bulgaria
Cantona 31'	Report	Kostadinov 37', 90'

Parc des Princes, Paris
Attendance: 48,402
Referee: Leslie Mottram (Scotland)

== Goalscorers ==
7 goals

- (Sweden) Martin Dahlin

6 goals

- (France) Eric Cantona

5 goals

- (Austria) Andreas Herzog
- (Bulgaria) Hristo Stoichkov

4 goals

- (Bulgaria) Emil Kostadinov
- (France) Jean-Pierre Papin

3 goals

- (Bulgaria) Lyuboslav Penev
- (France) Laurent Blanc
- (Israel) Ronen Harazi
- (Sweden) Tomas Brolin

2 goals

- (Austria) Dietmar Kühbauer
- (Austria) Heimo Pfeifenberger
- (Austria) Anton Polster
- (Bulgaria) Krasimir Balakov
- (Finland) Ari Hjelm
- (Finland) Aki Hyryläinen
- (France) Franck Sauzée
- (Israel) Ronny Rosenthal
- (Israel) Itzik Zohar
- (Sweden) Klas Ingesson

1 goal

- (Austria) Andreas Ogris
- (Austria) Hannes Reinmayr
- (Austria) Peter Stöger
- (Austria) Michael Zisser
- (Bulgaria) Trifon Ivanov
- (Bulgaria) Yordan Lechkov
- (Bulgaria) Zlatko Yankov
- (Bulgaria) Nasko Sirakov
- (Finland) Petri Järvinen
- (Finland) Jari Litmanen
- (Finland) Mika-Matti Paatelainen
- (Finland) Marko Rajamäki
- (Finland) Kim Suominen
- (France) David Ginola
- (France) Alain Roche
- (Israel) Reuven Atar
- (Israel) Tal Banin
- (Israel) Eyal Berkovic
- (Sweden) Jan Eriksson
- (Sweden) Stefan Landberg
- (Sweden) Henrik Larsson
- (Sweden) Anders Limpar
- (Sweden) Håkan Mild
- (Sweden) Stefan Pettersson
- (Sweden) Pär Zetterberg
