= Michael Zisser =

Austrian football manager (born 1966)

Personal information
- Date of birth: 5 October 1966 (age 60)
- Place of birth: Graz, Austria
- Height: 1.87 m (6 ft 2 in)
- Position: Defender

Senior career*
Years	Team	Apps	(Gls)
1985–1991	Grazer AK		
1991–1993	VfB Mödling		
1993–1994	SK Rapid Wien		
1994–1995	VfB Mödling		
1995–1997	Grazer AK		
1998–1999	TSV Hartberg		
1999	SV Spittal/Drau		
2000	USV Gnas		

International career
1993	Austria	1	(1)

Managerial career
- 2012: SK Sturm Graz II
- 2014: USV Allerheiligen
- 2014–2015: ASK Köflach
- 2015–2018: SC Kalsdorf
- 2018–2021: ASK Voitsberg
- 2022–2023: SV Feldbach
- 2023–2024: FC Gratkorn
- * Club domestic league appearances and goals

Michael Zisser (born 5 October 1966) is an Austrian professional football manager and former player who most recently managed Oberliga Central club FC Gratkorn.

== International goal ==
Scores and results list Austria's goal tally first.

No	Date	Venue	Opponent	Score	Result	Competition
1.	13 May 1993	Paavo Nurmi Stadium, Turku, Finland	Finland	1–3	1–3	1994 World Cup qualifier
