= Peter van Vossen =

Dutch footballer (born 1968)

Personal information
- Full name: Peter Jacobus van Vossen
- Date of birth: 21 April 1968 (age 58)
- Place of birth: Zierikzee, Netherlands
- Height: 1.82 m (6 ft 0 in)
- Position: Forward

Senior career*
Years	Team	Apps	(Gls)
1987–1989	VC Vlissingen	29	(12)
1989–1992	Beveren	84	(36)
1992–1993	Anderlecht	30	(6)
1993–1995	Ajax	41	(6)
1995–1996	Istanbulspor	16	(5)
1996–1998	Rangers	22	(5)
1998–2001	Feyenoord	73	(10)
2001–2003	De Graafschap	44	(9)
2003–2004	VV Bennekom	23	(7)
2004	Vitesse	6	(0)
Total		368	(96)

International career
1992–2000	Netherlands	31	(9)

Managerial career
- 2009–2010: AGOVV Apeldoorn (assistant)
- 2010–2011: RBC Roosendaal (assistant)
- 2012–2014: Almere City (assistant)
- 2014–2015: Fortuna Sittard
Medal record
Men's football
Representing Netherlands
UEFA European Championship
Bronze medal – third place	2000
- * Club domestic league appearances and goals

Peter Jacobus van Vossen (Dutch pronunciation: [ˈpeːtər jaːˈkoːbʏs fɑɱ ˈvɔsə(n)]; born 21 April 1968) is a Dutch former professional football player and manager.

== Club career ==
Van Vossen was born in Zierikzee. As a footballer, he played as a forward for Beveren, Anderlecht, Ajax, Istanbulspor, Rangers, Feyenoord, De Graafschap and Vitesse. During his time with Ajax he won the 1994–95 European Cup.

He joined Rangers in January 1996 in an exchange deal for Russian striker Oleg Salenko from Turkish side Istanbulspor, but made just seven Scottish Premier Division appearances that season, failing to score. He managed five goals in 14 appearances the following season as Rangers matched Celtic's record of nine successive league title, but featured just once in the 1997–98 campaign before returning to the Netherlands and signing for Feyenoord.

== International career ==
Van Vossen picked up 31 international caps for the Netherlands national team, scoring nine goals. He participated at 1994 FIFA World Cup and at the Euro 2000. Van Vossen was initially selected to participate at Euro 1992, but missed it due to thrombosis.

== Career statistics ==
=== International ===
Appearances and goals by national team and year
National team	Year	Apps	Goals
Netherlands	1992	3	4
Netherlands	1993	4	2
Netherlands	1994	9	1
Netherlands	1995	2	0
Netherlands	1996	0	0
Netherlands	1997	0	0
Netherlands	1998	3	1
Netherlands	1999	6	1
Netherlands	2000	4	0
Total		31	9

Scores and results list the Netherlands' goal tally first, score column indicates score after each van Vossen goal.

List of international goals scored by Peter van Vossen
No.	Date	Venue	Opponent	Score	Result	Competition
1	14 October 1992	De Kuip, Rotterdam, Netherlands	Poland	1–2	2–2	1994 FIFA World Cup qualification
2	14 October 1992	De Kuip, Rotterdam, Netherlands	Poland	2–2	2–2	1994 FIFA World Cup qualification
3	16 December 1992	İnönü Stadium, Istanbul, Turkey	Turkey	1–0	3–1	1994 FIFA World Cup qualification
4	16 December 1992	İnönü Stadium, Istanbul, Turkey	Turkey	3–1	3–1	1994 FIFA World Cup qualification
5	24 March 1993	Stadion Galgenwaard, Utrecht, Netherlands	San Marino	5–0	6–0	1994 FIFA World Cup qualification
6	28 April 1993	Wembley Stadium, London, England	England	2–2	2–2	1994 FIFA World Cup qualification
7	27 May 1994	Stadion Galgenwaard, Ultrecht, Netherlands	Scotland	2–0	3–1	Friendly
8	10 October 1998	Philips Stadion, Eindhoven, Netherlands	Peru	2–0	2–0	Friendly
9	5 June 1999	Estádio Fonte Nova, Salvador, Brazil	Brazil	2–2	2–2	Friendly

== Honours ==
Ajax

- Eredivisie: 1993–94, 1994–95
- UEFA Champions League: 1994–95
- Dutch Super Cup (later renamed Johan Cruyff Shield): 1993, 1994

Rangers

- Scottish Premier Division: 1996–97
- Scottish League Cup: 1996–97

Feyenoord

- Eredivisie: 1998–99
- Johan Cruyff Shield: 1999
