= Alessandro Golinucci =

Sammarinese footballer (born 1994)

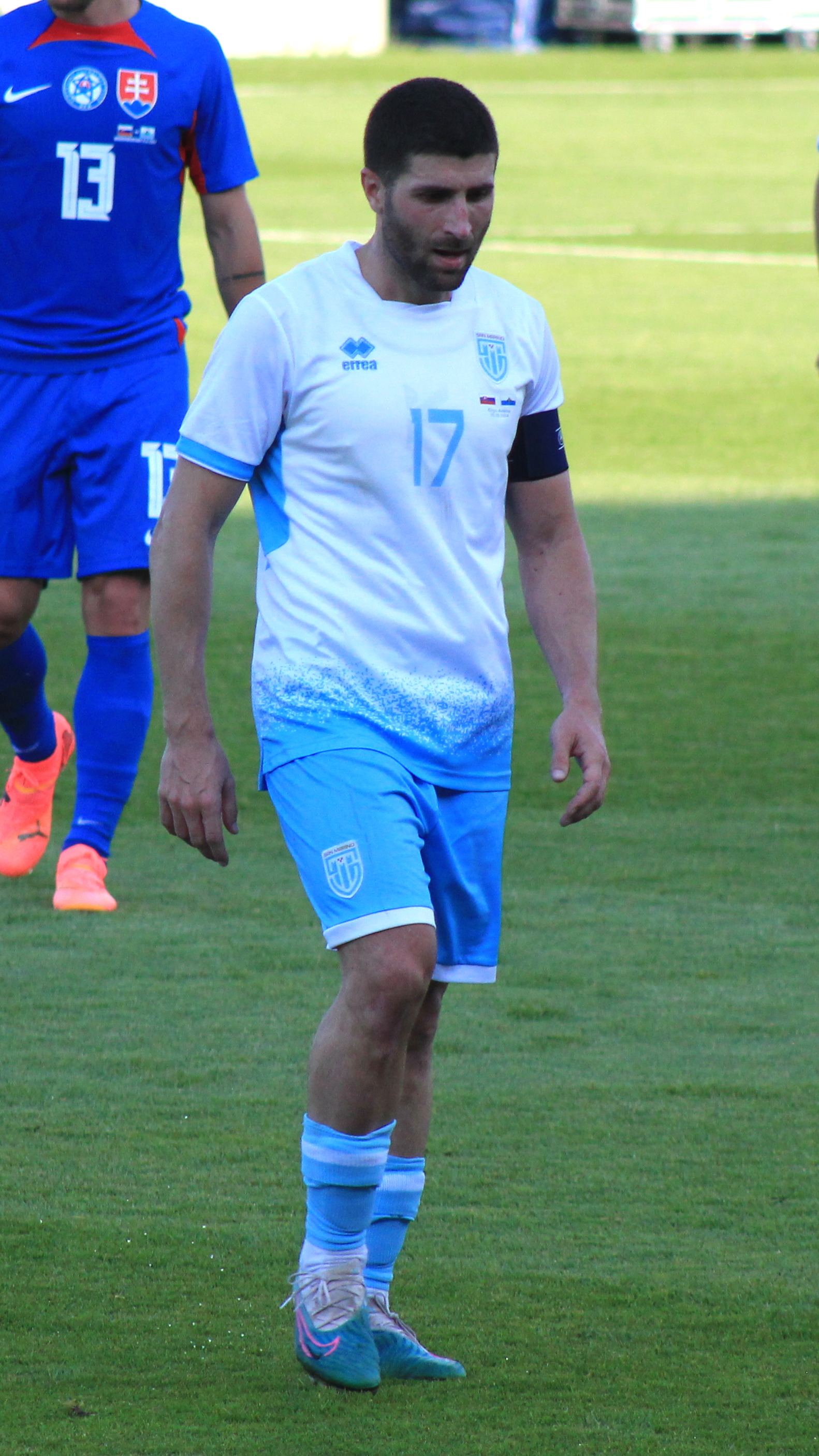
- Golinucci with San Marino against Slovakia (2024)

Personal information
- Date of birth: 10 October 1994 (age 32)
- Place of birth: San Marino
- Height: 1.71 m (5 ft 7 in)
- Position: Midfielder

Team information
- Current team: Virtus
- Number: 17

Youth career
- 2000–2011: San Marino Calcio
- 2011–2013: AC Sammaurese

Senior career*
Years	Team	Apps	(Gls)
2013–2018	Tropical Coriano	38	(7)
2018–2021	CBR Carli Pietracuta	10	
2021–	Virtus	139	(15)

International career^{‡}
2010	San Marino U17	3	(0)
2011–2012	San Marino U19	6	(0)
2012–2016	San Marino U21		(0)
2015–	San Marino	71	(2)
- * Club domestic league appearances and goals as of 31 May 2025 ‡ National team caps and goals as of 15 November 2026

Alessandro Golinucci (born 10 October 1994 in San Marino) is a Sammarinese footballer who plays for Virtus and the San Marino national football team.

== Club career ==
Golinucci joined Virtus in 2021, where he won his first title by achieving the 2022–23 Coppa Titano.

== International career ==
On 27 March 2015, Golinucci made his international debut for San Marino in a UEFA Euro 2016 qualifying match against Slovenia. He captained his national team for the first time on 19 June 2023 in a UEFA Euro 2024 qualifying match against Finland.

On 17 October 2023, Golinucci scored his first international goal in a 2–1 defeat against Denmark in the same Euro 2024 qualification campaign, to be his country's first goal in a European qualifying match in four years, and first competitive goal since 2021.

On 18 November 2024, during a UEFA Nations League D game against Liechtenstein, he scored his second goal with his country, becoming the sixth Sammarinese to score more than one goal, and at 30 years and 1 months San Marino’s oldest goalscorer ever in UEFA Nations League.

=== International goals ===
As of match played 18 November 2024. San Marino score listed first, score column indicates score after each Golinucci goal.

International goals by date, venue, cap, opponent, score, result and competition
No.	Date	Venue	Cap	Opponent	Score	Result	Competition
1	17 October 2023	San Marino Stadium, Serravalle, San Marino	48	Denmark	1–1	1–2	UEFA Euro 2024 qualifying
2	18 November 2024	Rheinpark Stadion, Vaduz, Liechtenstein	57	Liechtenstein	3–1	3–1	2024-25 UEFA Nations League D

== Personal life ==
His brother, Enrico, is also a footballer. Golinucci works by day at a toy company's distribution factory.
