= Claudio Canti =

Sammarinese footballer

Personal information
- Date of birth: 15 June 1965 (age 61)
- Position: Defender

Senior career*
| Years | Team | Apps | (Gls) |
| 1990–1996 | A.C. Juvenes | | |
| 1996–1997 | S.S. Folgore/Falciano | | |
| 2000–2003 | A.C. Juvenes/Dogana | | |

International career
| 1991–1995 | San Marino | 22 | (0) |
- * Club domestic league appearances and goals

Claudio Canti (born 15 June 1965) is a retired Sammarinese football defender.
