= Stefan Landberg =

Swedish footballer & coach (born 1970)

Personal information
- Full name: Stefan Olof Ragnar Landsberg
- Date of birth: 5 May 1970 (age 56)
- Place of birth: Hultsfred, Sweden
- Position: Midfielder

Senior career*
Years	Team	Apps	(Gls)
1987–1989	Kalmar FF	48	(16)
1990–1994	Östers IF	117	(22)
1995–2000	IFK Göteborg	106	(5)
Total		271	(43)

International career
1987–1988	Sweden U19	5	(2)
1990–1992	Sweden U21/O	25	(1)
1992–1997	Sweden	17	(1)
- * Club domestic league appearances and goals

Stefan Olof Ragnar Landberg (born 5 May 1970) is a Swedish football coach and former professional footballer who played as a midfielder.

== Club career ==
He played for Kalmar FF (1987–1989), Östers IF (1990–1994) and IFK Göteborg (1995–2000) during his career. He won two Allsvenskan titles while at IFK Göteborg, and was named the 2000 Årets Ärkeängel as IFK Göteborg's player of the year. He made a total of 196 appearances for IFK Göteborg, of which 106 was in Allsvenskan.

== International career ==
=== Youth ===
Landberg made 30 appearances for the Sweden U19, U21, and Olympic teams between 1987 and 1992, and represented Sweden at the 1992 Summer Olympics in Barcelona, Spain.

=== Senior ===
He made his full international debut for Sweden on 11 November 1992, in a 1994 FIFA World Cup qualifier against Israel when he replaced Tomas Brolin in the 87th minute in a 3–1 win. He scored his first international goal for Sweden the following year on 2 June 1993, when Sweden beat Israel 5–0 in the return game of the 1994 FIFA World Cup qualifiers. He appeared in a total of five qualifiers for the 1994 FIFA World Cup, but did not make Sweden's final squad for the main tournament.

Landberg made his 17th and final international appearance for the Sweden national team on 16 February 1997, in a friendly 3–1 win against Thailand.

== Coaching career ==
He was later an assistant coach of IFK Göteborg, together with Kjell Pettersson under head coach Arne Erlandsen.

== Career statistics ==
=== International ===
Appearances and goals by national team and year
National team	Year	Apps	Goals
Sweden	1992	1	0
Sweden	1993	6	1
Sweden	1994	3	0
Sweden	1995	1	0
Sweden	1996	3	0
Sweden	1997	3	0
Total		17	1

Scores and results list Sweden's goal tally first, score column indicates score after each Landberg goal.

List of international goals scored by Stefan Landberg
No.	Date	Venue	Opponent	Score	Result	Competition	Ref.
1	2 June 1993	Råsunda Stadium, Solna, Sweden	Israel	5–0	5–0	1994 FIFA World Cup qualifier	

== Honours ==
IFK Göteborg

- Allsvenskan: 1995, 1996

Individual

- Årets ärkeängel (IFK Göteborg supporters player of the year): 2000
