= UEFA Euro 1996 qualifying Group 8 =

European football tournament

Standings and results for Group 8 of the UEFA Euro 1996 qualifying tournament.

== Standings ==
Pos	Team	Pld	W	D	L	GF	GA	GD	Pts	Qualification	(Russia)	(Scotland)	(Greece)	(Finland)	(Faroe Islands)	(San Marino)
1	Russia	10	8	2	0	34	5	+29	26	Qualify for final tournament	—	0–0	2–1	3–1	3–0	4–0
2	Scotland	10	7	2	1	19	3	+16	23	Qualify for final tournament	1–1	—	1–0	1–0	5–1	5–0
3	Greece	10	6	0	4	23	9	+14	18		0–3	1–0	—	4–0	5–0	2–0
4	Finland	10	5	0	5	18	18	0	15		0–6	0–2	2–1	—	5–0	4–1
5	Faroe Islands	10	2	0	8	10	35	−25	6		2–5	0–2	1–5	0–4	—	3–0
6	San Marino	10	0	0	10	2	36	−34	0		0–7	0–2	0–4	0–2	1–3	—

Source: UEFA
Rules for classification: Qualification tiebreakers

== Results ==
7 September 1994
17:00 UTC+1

Faroe Islands	1 – 5	Greece
Apostolakis 90+1' (o.g.)	Report	Saravakos 12'; Tsalouchidis 17', 86'; Alexandris 55', 61'

Svangaskarð, Toftir
Attendance: 2,412
Referee: Michel Piraux (Belgium)
7 September 1994
19:00 UTC+3

Finland	0 – 2	Scotland
	Report	Shearer 29'; Collins 65'

Olympic Stadium, Helsinki
Attendance: 12,845
Referee: Ryszard Wójcik (Poland)

12 October 1994
21:00 UTC+1

Scotland	5 – 1	Faroe Islands
McGinlay 4'; Booth 5'; Collins 40', 72'; McKinlay 61'	Report	Müller 75'

Hampden Park, Glasgow
Attendance: 20,885
Referee: Terje Hauge (Norway)
12 October 1994
20:00 UTC+2

Greece	4 – 0	Finland
Markos 23'; Batista Lima 70'; Machlas 76', 90'	Report

Kaftanzoglio Stadium, Thessaloniki
Attendance: 7,704
Referee: Philippe Leduc (France)
12 October 1994
19:00 UTC+3

Russia	4 – 0	San Marino
Karpin 43'; Kolyvanov 64'; Nikiforov 65'; Radchenko 67'	Report

Luzhniki Stadium, Moscow
Attendance: 5,500
Referee: Alain Hamer (Luxembourg)

16 November 1994
20:00 UTC+2

Greece	2 – 0	San Marino
Machlas 21'; Frantzeskos 84'	Report

Spiros Louis Stadium, Athens
Attendance: 2,859
Referee: Haim Lipkovitz (Israel)
16 November 1994
19:00 UTC+2

Finland	5 – 0	Faroe Islands
Sumiala 37'; Litmanen 53', 72'; Paatelainen 75', 85'	Report

Olympic Stadium, Helsinki
Attendance: 2,420
Referee: Gylfi Thór Orrason (Iceland)
16 November 1994
20:00 UTC

Scotland	1 – 1	Russia
Booth 19'	Report	Radchenko 25'

Hampden Park, Glasgow
Attendance: 31,254
Referee: Bo Karlsson (Sweden)

14 December 1994
19:00 UTC+2

Finland	4 – 1	San Marino
Paatelainen 24', 30', 86', 90'	Report	Della Valle 34'

Olympic Stadium, Helsinki
Attendance: 3,140
Referee: Hermann Albrecht (Germany)
18 December 1994
20:00 UTC+2

Greece	1 – 0	Scotland
Apostolakis 19' (pen.)	Report

Spiros Louis Stadium, Athens
Attendance: 7,976
Referee: John Blankenstein (Netherlands)

29 March 1995
20:00 UTC+4

Russia	0 – 0	Scotland
	Report

Luzhniki Stadium, Moscow
Attendance: 13,939
Referee: Hartmut Strampe (Germany)
29 March 1995
19:00 UTC+2

San Marino	0 – 2	Finland
	Report	Litmanen 45'; Sumiala 67'

Stadio Olimpico, Serravalle
Attendance: 824
Referee: David Suheil (Israel)

26 April 1995
20:05 UTC+2

San Marino	0 – 2	Scotland
	Report	Collins 19'; Calderwood 85'

Stadio Olimpico, Serravalle
Attendance: 1,484
Referee: Loizos Loizou (Cyprus)
26 April 1995
21:00 UTC+3

Greece	0 – 3	Russia
	Report	Nikiforov 36'; Zagorakis 78' (o.g.); Beschastnykh 79'

Kaftanzoglio Stadium, Thessaloniki
Attendance: 29,616
Referee: Loris Stafoggia (Italy)
26 April 1995
19:00 UTC+1

Faroe Islands	0 – 4	Finland
	Report	Hjelm 55'; Paatelainen 75'; Lindberg 78'; Helin 83'

Svangaskarð, Toftir
Attendance: 1,338
Referee: Alan Howells (Wales)

6 May 1995
19:00 UTC+4

Russia	3 – 0	Faroe Islands
Kechinov 53'; Pisarev 72'; Mukhamadiev 80'	Report

Luzhniki Stadium, Moscow
Attendance: 5,024
Referee: Sergo Kvaratskhelia (Georgia)

25 May 1995
16:00 UTC+1

Faroe Islands	3 – 0	San Marino
J. K. Hansen 6'; Rasmussen 9'; Johnsson 52'	Report

Svangaskarð, Toftir
Attendance: 3,450
Referee: Brendan Shorte (Ireland)

7 June 1995
20:00 UTC+2

San Marino	0 – 7	Russia
	Report	Dobrovolski 20' (pen.); Kulkov 38'; Kiriakov 48'; Shalimov 49'; Beschastnykh 59'; Kolyvanov 64'; Cheryshev 86'

Stadio Olimpico, Serravalle
Attendance: 1,367
Referee: Karel Bohunek (Czech Republic)
7 June 1995
19:00 UTC+1

Faroe Islands	0 – 2	Scotland
	Report	McKinlay 25'; McGinlay 29'

Svangaskarð, Toftir
Attendance: 3,881
Referee: Vladimír Hriňák (Slovakia)
11 June 1995
19:00 UTC+3

Finland	2 – 1	Greece
Litmanen 45+1' (pen.); Hjelm 54'	Report	Nikolaidis 6'

Olympic Stadium, Helsinki
Attendance: 10,518
Referee: Hellmut Krug (Germany)

16 August 1995
19:00 UTC+3

Finland	0 – 6	Russia
	Report	Kulkov 33', 49'; Karpin 41'; Radchenko 43'; Kolyvanov 66', 69'

Olympic Stadium, Helsinki
Attendance: 14,210
Referee: Sándor Puhl (Hungary)
16 August 1995
20:00 UTC+1

Scotland	1 – 0	Greece
McCoist 72'	Report

Hampden Park, Glasgow
Attendance: 33,910
Referee: Peter Mikkelsen (Denmark)

6 September 1995
20:00 UTC+1

Scotland	1 – 0	Finland
Booth 10'	Report

Hampden Park, Glasgow
Attendance: 35,018
Referee: Vasiliy Melnichuk (Ukraine)
6 September 1995
17:00 UTC+1

Faroe Islands	2 – 5	Russia
Jarnskor 12'; T.Jónsson 53'	Report	Mostovoi 9' (pen.); Kiriakov 61'; Kolyvanov 65'; Tsymbalar 83'; Shalimov 85'

Svangaskarð, Toftir
Attendance: 1,792
Referee: Alan Snoddy (Northern Ireland)
6 September 1995
20:30 UTC+2

San Marino	0 – 4	Greece
	Report	Tsalouchidis 5'; Georgiadis 31'; Alexandris 61'; Donis 81'

Stadio Olimpico, Serravalle
Attendance: 886
Referee: Milan Mitrovič (Slovenia)

11 October 1995
20:00 UTC+3

Russia	2 – 1	Greece
Ouzounidis 36' (o.g.); Onopko 71'	Report	Tsalouchidis 64'

Luzhniki Stadium, Moscow
Attendance: 19,190
Referee: Gerd Grabher (Austria)
11 October 1995
20:30 UTC+1

San Marino	1 – 3	Faroe Islands
M.Valentini 52'	Report	T.Jónsson 42', 45', 50'

Stadio Olimpico, Serravalle
Attendance: 928
Referee: Roland Beck (Liechtenstein)

15 November 1995
20:00 UTC

Scotland	5 – 0	San Marino
Jess 30'; Booth 45'; McCoist 49'; Nevin 79'; Francini 90' (o.g.)	Report

Hampden Park, Glasgow
Attendance: 29,492
Referee: Karel Bohunek (Czech Republic)
15 November 1995
19:00 UTC+3

Russia	3 – 1	Finland
Radchenko 40'; Kulkov 55'; Kiriakov 70'	Report	Suominen 44'

Luzhniki Stadium, Moscow
Attendance: 6,000
Referee: Markus Merk (Germany)
15 November 1995
19:30 UTC+2

Greece	5 – 0	Faroe Islands
Alexandris 58'; Nikolaidis 62'; Machlas 66'; Donis 75'; Tsiartas 80'	Report

Theodoros Vardinogiannis Stadium, Heraklion
Attendance: 9,088
Referee: Mitko Mitrev (Bulgaria)

== Goalscorers ==
There were 106 goals scored in 30 matches, for an average of 3.53 goals per match.

7 goals

- (Finland) Mixu Paatelainen

5 goals

- (Russia) Igor Kolyvanov

4 goals

- (Faroe Islands) Todi Jónsson
- (Finland) Jari Litmanen
- (Greece) Alexis Alexandris
- (Greece) Nikos Machlas
- (Greece) Panagiotis Tsalouchidis
- (Russia) Vasili Kulkov
- (Russia) Dmitri Radchenko
- (Scotland) Scott Booth
- (Scotland) John Collins

3 goals

- (Russia) Sergei Kiriakov

2 goals

- (Finland) Ari Hjelm
- (Finland) Antti Sumiala
- (Greece) Georgios Donis
- (Greece) Demis Nikolaidis
- (Russia) Vladimir Beschastnykh
- (Russia) Valeri Karpin
- (Russia) Yuriy Nikiforov
- (Russia) Igor Shalimov
- (Scotland) Ally McCoist
- (Scotland) John McGinlay
- (Scotland) Billy McKinlay

1 goal

- (Faroe Islands) Jens Kristian Hansen
- (Faroe Islands) Henning Jarnskor
- (Faroe Islands) Julian Johnsson
- (Faroe Islands) Jan Allan Müller
- (Faroe Islands) Jens Erik Rasmussen
- (Finland) Petri Helin
- (Finland) Janne Lindberg
- (Finland) Kim Suominen
- (Greece) Stratos Apostolakis
- (Greece) Daniel Batista
- (Greece) Kostas Frantzeskos
- (Greece) Georgios Georgiadis
- (Greece) Dimitris Markos
- (Greece) Dimitris Saravakos
- (Greece) Vasilios Tsiartas
- (Russia) Dmitri Cheryshev
- (Russia) Igor Dobrovolski
- (Russia) Valery Kechinov
- (Russia) Aleksandr Mostovoi
- (Russia) Mukhsin Mukhamadiev
- (Russia) Viktor Onopko
- (Russia) Nikolai Pisarev
- (Russia) Ilya Tsymbalar
- (San Marino) Pier Domenico Della Valle
- (San Marino) Mauro Valentini
- (Scotland) Colin Calderwood
- (Scotland) Eoin Jess
- (Scotland) Pat Nevin
- (Scotland) Duncan Shearer

1 own goal

- (Greece) Stratos Apostolakis (against Faroe Islands)
- (Greece) Marinos Ouzounidis (against Russia)
- (Greece) Theodoros Zagorakis (against Russia)
- (San Marino) Fabio Francini (against Scotland)
