= Kim Suominen =

Finnish footballer (1969–2021)

Personal information
- Date of birth: 20 October 1969
- Place of birth: Turku, Finland
- Date of death: 18 November 2021 (aged 52)
- Place of death: Turku, Finland
- Position: Midfielder

Youth career
- 1980–1986: TPS

Senior career*
Years	Team	Apps	(Gls)
1987–1991	TPS	131	(16)
1992–1993	Jaro	52	(4)
1994	TPV	26	(2)
1994–1996	Admira Wacker	27	(1)
1996–1997	IFK Norrköping	45	(2)
1998	Inter Turku	23	(3)
1999	Jazz	28	(3)
2000	TPS	28	(1)

International career
1993–1996	Finland	39	(4)

Managerial career
- 2011–2021: TPS (youth)
- * Club domestic league appearances and goals

Kim Suominen (20 October 1969 – 18 November 2021) was a Finnish footballer who played as a midfielder.

On 18 November 2021, Suominen died after suffering a heart attack while he was coaching a training session with TPS youth team.

== Career statistics ==
=== Club ===
As of 19 May 2024.

Appearances and goals by club, season and competition
Club	Season	League			National cup (Note: Includes ÖFB-Cup)		Europe		Total	
Club	Season	Division	Apps	Goals	Apps	Goals	Apps	Goals	Apps	Goals
TPS	1987	Mestaruussarja	20	3			4 (Note: Includes UEFA Cup)	0	24	3
TPS	1988	Mestaruussarja	27	1			6	1	33	2
TPS	1989	Mestaruussarja	26	7					26	7
TPS	1990	Veikkausliiga	25	3			2	0	27	3
TPS	1991	Veikkausliiga	33	2			–		33	2
TPS	Total		131	16			12	1	143	17
Jaro	1992	Veikkausliiga	31	4			–		31	4
Jaro	1993	Veikkausliiga	21	0			–		21	0
Jaro	Total		52	4	–	–	–	–	52	4
TPV	1994	Veikkausliiga	26	2	–		–		26	2
Admira Wacker	1994–95	Austrian Bundesliga	14	1	0	0	–		14	1
Admira Wacker	1995–96	Austrian Bundesliga	13	0	2	0	–		15	0
Admira Wacker	Total		27	1	2	0	–	–	29	1
IFK Norrköping	1996	Allsvenskan	25	0					25	0
IFK Norrköping	1997	Allsvenskan	20	2					20	2
IFK Norrköping	Total		45	2	–	–	–	–	45	2
Inter Turku	1998	Ykkönen	23	3	0	0	–		23	3
Jazz	1999	Veikkausliiga	28	3	0	0	–		28	3
TPS	2000	Veikkausliiga	28	1	0	0	–		28	1
Career total			360	32	2	0	12	1	374	33

=== International goals ===
As of match played 15 November 1995. Finland score listed first, score column indicates score after each Suominen goal.

List of international goals scored by Kim Suominen
No.	Date	Venue	Opponent	Score	Result	Competition
1	13 October 1993	Råsunda Stadium, Stockholm, Sweden	Sweden	1–0	2–3	1994 FIFA World Cup qualification
2	30 January 1994	Muscat, Oman	Oman	1–0	2–0	Friendly
3	17 August 1994	Parken, Copenhagen, Denmark	Denmark	1–0	1–2	Friendly
4	15 November 1995	Luzhniki Stadium, Moscow, Russia	Russia	1–1	1–3	UEFA Euro 1996 qualifying

== Honours ==
TPS:

- Finnish Cup: 1991
- Mestaruussarja: runner-up 1989

TPV

- Veikkausliiga: 1994
