= Aki Hyryläinen =

Finnish footballer (born 1968)

Personal information
- Full name: Aki-Mikael Hyryläinen
- Date of birth: 17 April 1968 (age 58)
- Place of birth: Helsinki, Finland
- Height: 1.92 m (6 ft 4 in)
- Position: Defender

Youth career
- 1974–1988: HJK Helsinki

Senior career*
| Years | Team | Apps | (Gls) |
| 1985 | Kampin Pallo | 0 | (0) |
| 1988 | Vantaan Pallo | 18 | (1) |
| 1989–1993 | HJK | 120 | (7) |
| 1993–1994 | Eendracht Aalst | 9 | (0) |
| 1994–1996 | HJK | 60 | (5) |
| 1996–1998 | Copenhagen | 14 | (0) |
| 1998 | Viborg | 0 | (0) |
| 1999 | Fremad Amager | 0 | (0) |
| 1999–2001 | Jokerit | 47 | (2) |
| Total | | 242 | (14) |

International career
| 1992–1997 | Finland | 25 | (1) |

Managerial career
- 2002–2004: FCK Salamat
- 2005–2007: HJK (U19)
- 2007: HJK
- * Club domestic league appearances and goals

Aki-Mikael Hyryläinen (born 17 April 1968) is a Finnish football coach and a former player. Throughout his career, he played as a center-back. He is a legend of HJK Helsinki due to his 180 league appearances. He retired in 2002.

Hyryläinen is currently working as a technical director in Finnish FA, having started in January 2023.

== Personal life ==
His son Luka is a professional football player.

== Career statistics ==
=== Club ===
As of 1 September 2024.

Appearances and goals by club, season and competition
| Club | Season | League | | | Cup (Note: Includes Suomen Cup, Belgian Cup and Danish Cup) | | Europe | | Total | |
| Club | Season | Division | Apps | Goals | Apps | Goals | Apps | Goals | Apps | Goals |
|---|---|---|---|---|---|---|---|---|---|---|
| Vantaan Pallo | 1988 | Ykkönen | 18 | 1 | – | | – | | 18 | 1 |
| HJK | 1989 | Mestaruussarja | 15 | 0 | – | | – | | 15 | 0 |
| HJK | 1990 | Veikkausliiga | 20 | 1 | – | | – | | 20 | 1 |
| HJK | 1991 | Veikkausliiga | 27 | 2 | – | | 2 (Note: Appearances in European Cup) | 0 | 29 | 2 |
| HJK | 1992 | Veikkausliiga | 32 | 3 | – | | – | | 32 | 3 |
| HJK | 1993 | Veikkausliiga | 26 | 1 | – | | 4 (Note: Appearances in UEFA Champions League) | 0 | 30 | 1 |
| HJK | Total | | 120 | 7 | 0 | 0 | 6 | 0 | 126 | 7 |
| Eendracht Aalst | 1993–94 | Belgian Second Division | 9 | 0 | 1 | 0 | – | | 10 | 0 |
| HJK | 1994 | Veikkausliiga | 23 | 3 | – | | 4 (Note: Appearances in UEFA Cup Winners' Cup) | 0 | 27 | 3 |
| HJK | 1995 | Veikkausliiga | 13 | 0 | – | | 1 (Note: Appearance(s) in UEFA Intertoto Cup) | 0 | 14 | 0 |
| HJK | 1996 | Veikkausliiga | 24 | 2 | 1 | 0 | 4 (Note: Appearances in UEFA Cup) | 1 | 29 | 3 |
| HJK | Total | | 60 | 5 | 1 | 0 | 9 | 1 | 70 | 6 |
| Copenhagen | 1996–97 | Danish Superliga | 8 | 0 | 1 | 0 | 0 | 0 | 9 | 0 |
| Copenhagen | 1997–98 | Danish Superliga | 6 | 0 | 0 | 0 | 0 | 0 | 6 | 0 |
| Copenhagen | Total | | 14 | 0 | 1 | 0 | 0 | 0 | 15 | 0 |
| Jokerit | 1999 | Veikkausliiga | 16 | 2 | 1 | 0 | 5 | 0 | 22 | 2 |
| Jokerit | 2000 | Veikkausliiga | 31 | 0 | 0 | 0 | 2 | 1 | 33 | 1 |
| Jokerit | Total | | 47 | 2 | 1 | 0 | 7 | 1 | 55 | 3 |
| Career total | | | 268 | 15 | 4 | 0 | 22 | 2 | 294 | 17 |

=== International ===
Appearances and goals by national team and year
| National team | Year | Apps | Goals |
|---|---|---|---|
Finland
| Finland | 1992 | 1 | 0 |
| Finland | 1993 | 8 | 1 |
| Finland | 1994 | 6 | 0 |
| Finland | 1995 | 3 | 0 |
| Finland | 1996 | 5 | 0 |
| Finland | 1997 | 1 | 0 |
| Total | | 24 | 1 |

Scores and results list Finland's goal tally first, score column indicates score after each Hyryläinen goal.

List of international goals scored by Aki Hyryläinen
| No. | Date | Venue | Opponent | Score | Result | Competition |
|---|---|---|---|---|---|---|
| 1. | 10 Nov 1993 | Ramat Gan Stadium, Ramat Gan, Israel | Israel | 1–0 | 3–1 | 1994 FIFA World Cup qualification |

== Honours ==
HJK

- Veikkausliiga: 1990, 1992
- Finnish Cup: 1996

Copenhagen

- Danish Cup: 1996–97

Jokerit

- Finnish Cup: 1999
