= Mauro Valentini (footballer, born 1973) =

Sammarinese footballer

Personal information
- Full name: Mauro Valentini
- Date of birth: 27 July 1973 (age 53)
- Place of birth: Viterbo, Italy
- Height: 1.78 m (5 ft 10 in)
- Position: Defender

Senior career*
Years	Team	Apps	(Gls)
1990–1991	Rimini		
1991–1992	A.S. Urbino		
1993–1997	Rimini		
1998–1999	Cocif Longiano		
2002–2003	La Fiorita		

International career
1991–1999	San Marino	23	(1)
- * Club domestic league appearances and goals

Mauro Valentini (born 27 July 1973) is a Sammarinese former footballer who played as a defender and made 23 appearances for the San Marino national team.

== Career ==
Valentini was born in Viterbo, Italy. He spent most of his career at Rimini, but also played for in A.S. Urbino in the 1992–92 season and Cocif Longiano in the 1998–99 season.

Valentini made his international debut for San Marino on 5 June 1991 in a UEFA Euro 1992 qualifying match against Switzerland, which finished as a 0–7 away loss. He went on to make 23 appearances, scoring 1 goal, before making his last appearance on 31 March 1999 in a UEFA Euro 2000 qualifying match against Spain, which finished as a 0–6 home loss.

== Career statistics ==
=== International ===
San Marino
Year	Apps	Goals
1991	2	0
1993	6	0
1994	2	0
1995	5	1
1996	1	0
1997	3	0
1998	3	0
1999	1	0
Total	23	1

=== International goals ===
No.	Date	Venue	Opponent	Score	Result	Competition
1	11 October 1995	Stadio Olimpico, Serravalle, San Marino	Faroe Islands	1–2	1–3	UEFA Euro 1996 qualifying
