= Pier Domenico Della Valle =

Sammarinese footballer

Personal information
- Full name: Pier Domenico Della Valle
- Date of birth: 4 May 1970 (age 56)
- Place of birth: Faetano, San Marino
- Position: Midfielder

Senior career*
Years	Team	Apps	(Gls)
1990–1991	Faetano		
1991–1996	A.S. Novafeltria		
1996–1997	Olympia Secchiano		
1996–1997	U.S. Taverna		
1998–2000	Almas Rivazzurra		
2000–2005	Faetano	18+	

International career
1991–2000	San Marino	21	(1)
- * Club domestic league appearances and goals

Pier Domenico Della Valle (born 4 May 1970) is a Sammarinese former footballer who played as a midfielder and made 21 appearances for the San Marino national team.

== Career ==
Della Valle made his international debut for San Marino on 16 October 1991 in a UEFA Euro 1992 qualifying match against Bulgaria, which finished as a 0–4 away loss. He went on to make 21 appearances, scoring 1 goal, before making his last appearance on 7 October 2000 in a 2002 FIFA World Cup qualification match against Scotland, which finished as a 0–2 home loss.

== Career statistics ==
=== International ===
San Marino
Year	Apps	Goals
1991	1	0
1992	1	0
1993	4	0
1994	3	1
1995	4	0
1997	2	0
1998	2	0
1999	3	0
2000	1	0
Total	21	1

=== International goals ===
No.	Date	Venue	Opponent	Score	Result	Competition
1	14 December 1994	Olympic Stadium, Helsinki, Finland	Finland	1–2	1–4	UEFA Euro 1996 qualifying
