= Stadio Renato Dall'Ara =

Football stadium

Coordinates: 44°29′32″N 11°18′35″E

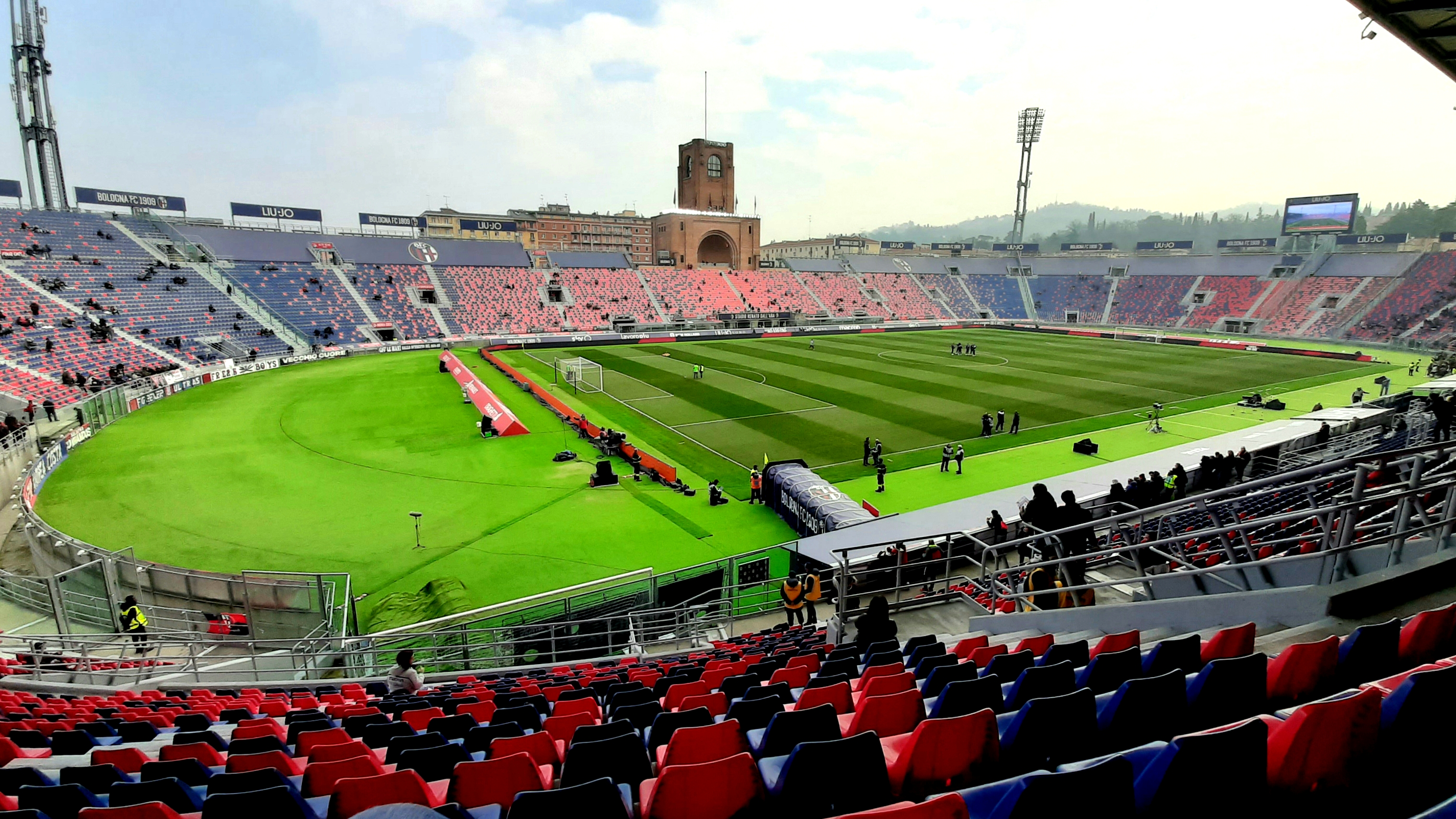
- Interactive map of Stadio Renato Dall'Ara
- Former names: Stadio Littoriale (1927–1945); Stadio Comunale (1945–1983)
- Location: Bologna, Italy
- Owner: Bologna Football Club 1909 Bologna City Council
- Operator: Bologna Football Club 1909
- Capacity: 36,532
- Surface: Grass; 105x68m
- Record attendance: 47,000 (Metallica; 3 June 2026)

Construction
- Groundbreaking: 1925
- Opened: 1927
- Renovated: 2015

Tenants
- Bologna F.C. (1927–present); Italy national football team (selected matches)

Stadio Renato Dall'Ara is a multi-purpose stadium in Bologna, Italy. It is currently used mostly for football matches and the home of Bologna FC. The stadium was designed by Giulio Ulisse Arata and inaugurated in 1927 as Stadio Littoriale. It was one of the first stadiums to incorporate the stands into the architecture, an innovation which later became the model for stadiums around the world. The large arch contained an equestrian statue of the dictator Benito Mussolini, which was destroyed during the city's liberation in 1943. The stadium replaced the Stadio Sterlino and is named after Renato Dall'Ara (1892–1964), a former president of Bologna for thirty years.

The stadium hosted matches in both the 1934 FIFA World Cup and the 1990 FIFA World Cup. Its inclusion in the latter demanded both expansion and modernisation. An increased, all-seated capacity was achieved by adding three rows at the bottom, where the parterre sat, and twelve at the top. To facilitate this, an exposed steel framework, incorporating 120 columns, was aligned with the pre-existing pilasters, supporting the extended terrace and providing access via a series of stairwells running around the stadium’s perimeter. The old roof was replaced with a more substantial, cantilevered structure, reaching backwards 5 metres from the rear of the tribuna and following the curve of the terrace, before stopping abruptly, "as if satisfied that more than enough protection had been afforded to the spectators below." Finally the tower, which was built around and scrubbed up – the extended terrace drops down as it gets closer to it.

The last match of the 1990 tournament played there was the England vs Belgium match in the Round of 16, which ended 1–0 courtesy of an iconic extra-time goal scored by David Platt in the 119th minute.

Located in the Saragozza district, about 3.5 km from the center of the city, it regularly hosts Bologna's home matches. The stadium has around 36,000 seats and its capacity can be increased up to 55,000 for concerts.

== International fixtures ==
The 17 November 1993 qualifier between San Marino and England finished with England winning 7–1, but only after the hosts scored in the opening seconds of the match. It was the quickest goal ever scored, by Davide Gualtieri of San Marino, taking 8.3 seconds to put his team ahead against England.

The stadium also hosted three international rugby union test match in 1995, Italy vs. All Blacks (the All Blacks won the game 70–6), in 1997 Italy vs. Springboks (the Springboks won the game) and Italy vs. Ireland (Italy won the game).

The stadium features as the lead song on the Los Campesinos! album 'Sick Scenes'.

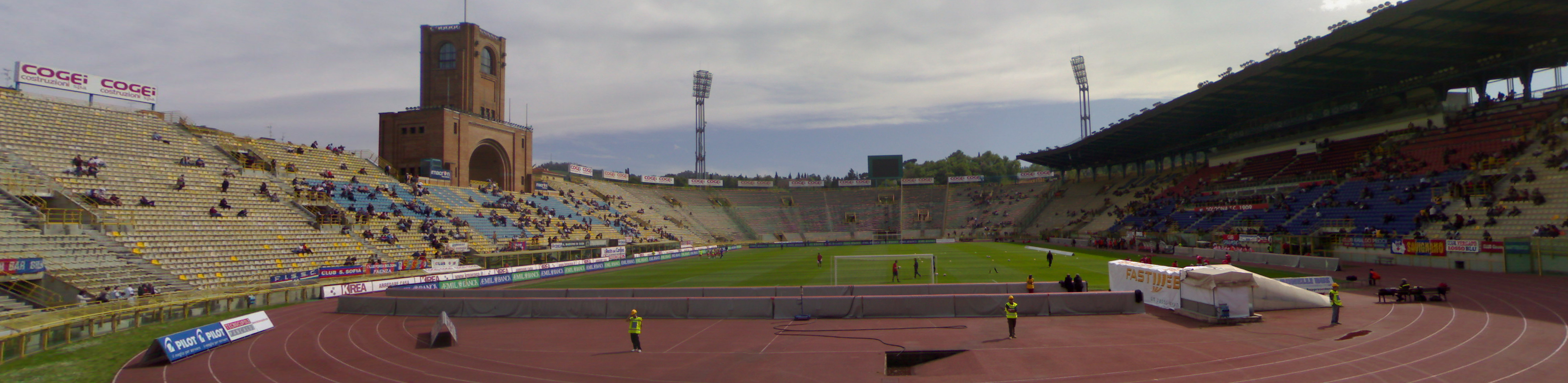
Panorama of Stadio Renato Dall'Ara

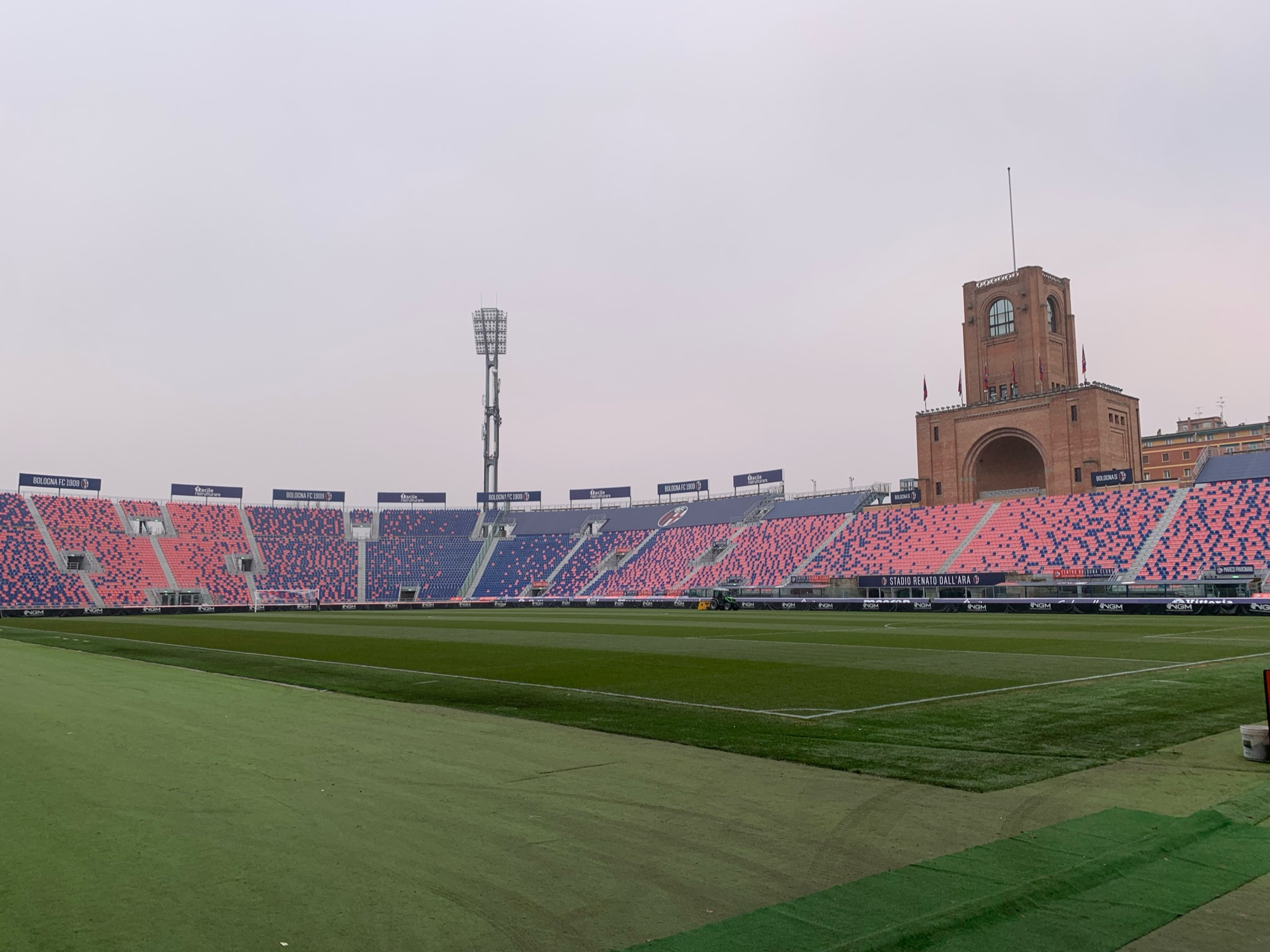
Bologna's Renato Dall‘Ara Stadium in 2021

== 1934 FIFA World Cup ==
The stadium was used for two matches during the 1934 FIFA World Cup.

Date	Team #1	Result	Team #2	Round
27 May 1934	Sweden	3–2	Argentina	Round of 16
31 May 1934	Austria	2–1	Hungary	Quarter-finals

== 1990 FIFA World Cup ==
The stadium was one of the venues of the 1990 FIFA World Cup.

It hosted the following matches:

Date	Team #1	Res.	Team #2	Round
9 June 1990	United Arab Emirates	0–2	Colombia	Group D
14 June 1990	Yugoslavia	1–0	Colombia	Group D
19 June 1990	Yugoslavia	4–1	United Arab Emirates	Group D
26 June 1990	England	1–0 (a.e.t.)	Belgium	Round of 16
