= Enrico Golinucci =

Sammarinese footballer

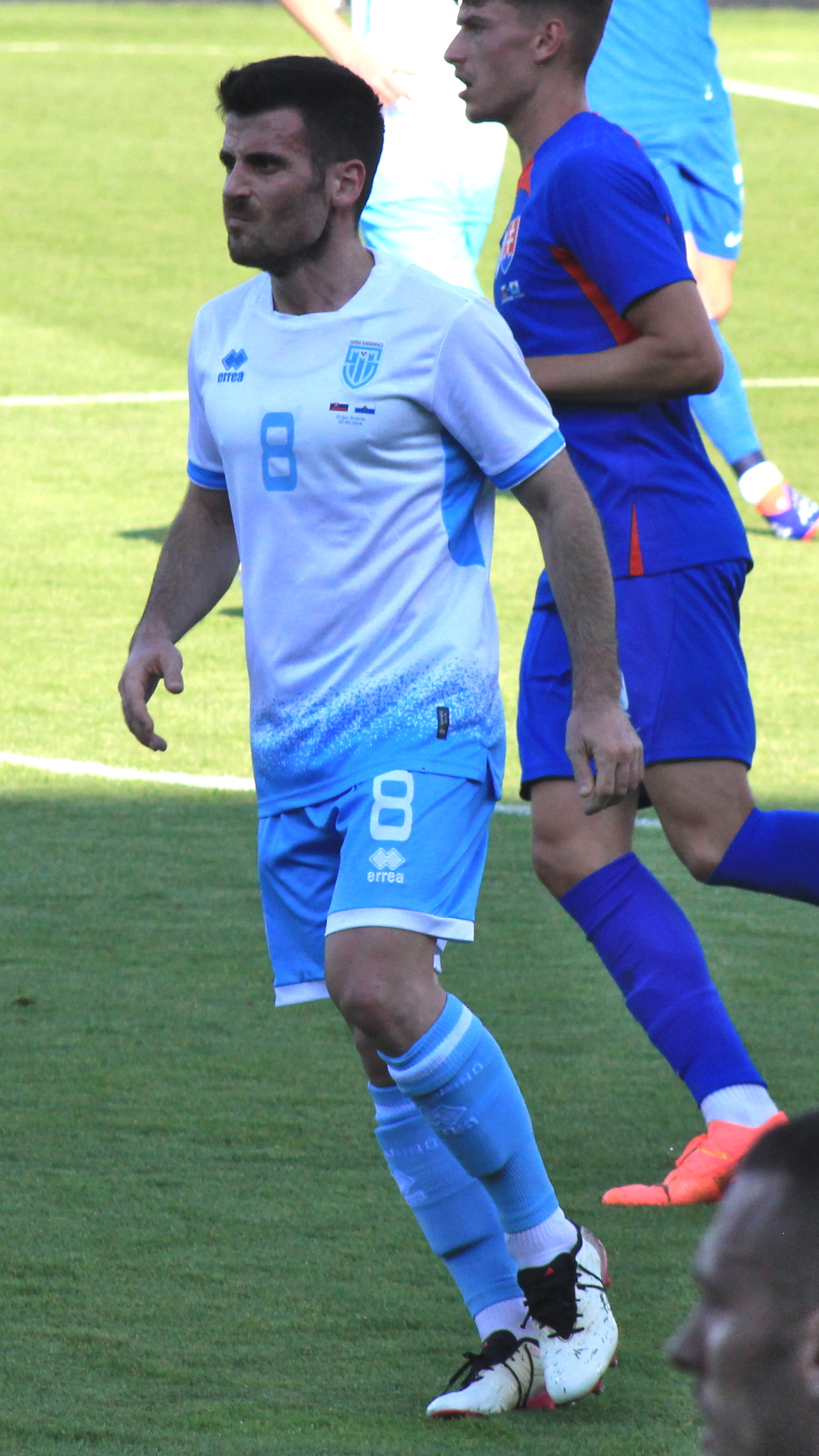
- Golinucci with San Marino against Slovakia (2024)

Personal information
- Full name: Enrico Golinucci
- Date of birth: 16 July 1991 (age 35)
- Place of birth: San Marino
- Height: 1.74 m (5 ft 9 in)
- Position: Midfielder

Team information
- Current team: Faetano
- Number: 8

Youth career
- San Marino Calcio

Senior career*
Years	Team	Apps	(Gls)
2010–2011	Real Marecchia		
2011–2013	Domagnano	33	(2)
2013–2021	Libertas	141	(18)
2021–2025	Folgore	121	(8)
2025–	Faetano	7	(1)

International career^{‡}
2006–?	San Marino U17		
2009	San Marino U19	3	(0)
2010–2013	San Marino U21	11	(0)
2014–	San Marino	43	(0)
- * Club domestic league appearances and goals as of 5 June 2026 ‡ National team caps and goals as of 14 October 2024

Enrico Golinucci (born 16 July 1991) is a Sammarinese footballer who plays as a midfielder for Faetano and the San Marino national team. His brother, Alessandro, is also a footballer.

== Career statistics ==
=== International ===
As of 14 October 2024

San Marino
Year	Apps	Goals
2014	1	0
2015	2	0
2016	1	0
2017	2	0
2018	4	0
2019	7	0
2020	4	0
2021	12	0
2022	4	0
2023	2	0
2024	4	0
Total	43	0

== Personal life ==
Golinucci works as a sales manager while also playing football.
