= Haraldur Ingólfsson =

Icelandic footballer

Personal information
- Date of birth: 1 August 1970 (age 56)
- Place of birth: Iceland
- Position: Midfielder

Senior career*
Years	Team	Apps	(Gls)
1987–1997	ÍA	190	(61)
1996–1997	→ Aberdeen (loan)	6	(0)
1998–2000	IF Elfsborg	44	(5)
2001–2003	Raufoss IL	82	(34)
2004	ÍA	16	(4)

International career
1990–1996	Iceland	20	(1)
- * Club domestic league appearances and goals

Haraldur Ingólfsson (born 1 August 1970) is an Icelandic former footballer who played at both professional and international levels as a midfielder.

== Career ==
=== Club career ===
Ingólfsson played club football in Iceland for ÍA. He spent a loan spell at the Scottish club Aberdeen during the 1996–97 season, making six appearances in the Scottish Football League. Ingólfsson later played in Sweden for IF Elfsborg and in Norway for Raufoss IL.

=== International career ===
Ingólfsson earned 20 caps for the Icelandic national side.

== Personal life ==
Ingólfsson is married to Jónína Víglundsdóttir, who has represented the Icelandic women's national side at football.
