= Davide Gualtieri =

Sammarinese footballer (born 1971)

Personal information
- Full name: Davide Gualtieri
- Date of birth: 27 April 1971 (age 55)
- Place of birth: San Marino, San Marino
- Height: 1.78 m (5 ft 10 in)
- Position: Striker

Senior career*
| Years | Team | Apps | (Gls) |
| 1993–1999 | Juvenes | | |
| 1999–2000 | Pennarossa | 4 | (3) |
| 2000–2009 | Tre Penne | 168 | (50) |

International career
| 1993–2000 | San Marino | 9 | (1) |
- * Club domestic league appearances and goals

Davide Gualtieri (born 27 April 1971) is a Sammarinese former footballer who played as a forward. He scored 8 seconds after kick-off in a FIFA World Cup qualification match against England on 17 November 1993.

In the match, which took place in Bologna, Italy, San Marino had the kick-off and the ball was quickly played through the inside right channel. England defender Stuart Pearce attempted a back pass to goalkeeper David Seaman. Pearce's pass was under-hit, and Gualtieri ran on to touch the ball past Seaman. The goal was timed at 8.3 seconds, which remained the fastest World Cup goal scored in either qualifying or the finals, until Christian Benteke scored after 8.1 seconds for Belgium against Gibraltar on 10 October 2016.

England took twenty minutes to equalise, but eventually won the match 7–1. Gualtieri's goal could have eliminated England from qualifying for the 1994 World Cup, as they needed to win by seven clear goals; however, the result was immaterial as England were also relying on Poland to beat the Netherlands, which they failed to do.

Gualtieri continued to play for the San Marino national team until 2000, when he retired due to injury at age 29. In the end, that was the only international goal in his career. He now works as a computer salesman in San Marino. In 2020, he appeared on the TV series Harry's Heroes: Euro Having a Laugh, assembling a Sammarinese team to play against a team of 1990s England players once more.

== International goal ==
Scores and results list San Marino's goal tally first.

| No | Date | Venue | Opponent | Score | Result | Competition |
|---|---|---|---|---|---|---|
| 1. | 17 November 1993 | Stadio Renato Dall'Ara, Bologna, Italy | England | 1–0 | 1–7 | 1994 World Cup qualifier |
