= Hlynur Birgisson =

Icelandic footballer

Personal information
- Date of birth: 22 January 1968 (age 58)
- Position: Defender

Senior career*
Years	Team	Apps	(Gls)
1984–1994	Þór Akureyri		
1995–1998	Örebro SK		
1999–2000	Leiftur		
2001–2008	Þór Akureyri		
2009–2011	Draupnir		

International career
1987–1997	Iceland	11	(1)
- * Club domestic league appearances and goals

Hlynur Birgisson (born 22 January 1968) is a retired Icelandic football defender.
