= Stefano Fanelli =

Luxembourgish footballer

Personal information
- Date of birth: 20 October 1969 (age 57)
- Position: Forward

Senior career*
Years	Team	Apps	(Gls)
1993–2001	F91 Dudelange		

International career
1993–1996	Luxembourg	6	(1)
- * Club domestic league appearances and goals

Stefano Fanelli (born 20 October 1969) is a retired Luxembourgish football striker. He became Luxembourg National Division top goalscorer in 1993–94.
