= Nicola Bacciocchi =

Sammarinese footballer

Personal information
- Full name: Nicola Bacciocchi
- Date of birth: 16 December 1971 (age 54)
- Place of birth: Domagnano, San Marino
- Height: 1.84 m (6 ft 1/2 in)
- Position: Midfielder

Senior career*
Years	Team	Apps	(Gls)
1990–1991	ASD Santarcangelo		
1991–1995	San Marino Calcio		
1995–1997	ASD Santarcangelo		
1997–2000	Juvenes Serravalle		
2000–2009	SP Domagnano		

International career^{‡}
1991–2000	San Marino	33	(1)
- * Club domestic league appearances and goals ‡ National team caps and goals as of 17 February 2012

Nicola Bacciocchi (born 16 December 1971) is San Marino former football player. At the time of his retirement he was one of the most experienced San Marino football players.

== International career ==
He played for the San Marino national football team from 1991 to 2000.
