= Nicolas Giacopetti =

Sammarinese footballer (born 2006)

Personal information
- Date of birth: 5 June 2006 (age 20)
- Position: Centre-forward

Team information
- Current team: Pietracuta

Youth career
- San Marino Academy

Senior career*
Years	Team	Apps	(Gls)
2024–2025	San Marino Academy	40	(13)
2025–	Pietracuta		

International career^{‡}
2022	San Marino U16	2	(0)
2022	San Marino U17	3	(0)
2024	San Marino U21	3	(0)
2024–	San Marino	21	(3)
- * Club domestic league appearances and goals as of 5 June 2026 ‡ National team caps and goals as of 19:31, 15 November 2026 (UTC)

Nicolas Giacopetti (born 5 June 2006) is a Sammarinese footballer who plays as a centre-forward for Pietracuta and the San Marino national team.

== International career ==
Giacopetti made his debut for the San Marino national team on 5 September 2024 in a Nations League game against Liechtenstein at the San Marino Stadium. He substituted Nicola Nanni in the 71st minute, as the game ended in 1–0 San Marino victory, which was their first ever competitive victory, and their second-ever victory overall (the first victory came 20 years earlier in a friendly against Liechtenstein).

On 18 November 2025, as San Marino lost 7–1 in a 2026 FIFA World Cup qualification game against Romania, he scored his first international goal, becoming at 19 years and 5 months the youngest Sammarinese to score in a FIFA World Cup qualification game.

== Career statistics ==
=== International ===
As of match played 15 November 2026

Appearances and goals by national team and year
National team	Year	Apps	Goals
San Marino	2024	5	0
San Marino	2025	7	1
San Marino	2026	9	2
Total		21	3

As of match played 28 March 2026
San Marino score listed first, score column indicates score after each Giacopetti goal

List of international goals scored by Nicolas Giacopetti
No.	Date	Venue	Cap	Opponent	Score	Result	Competition
1	18 November 2025	Ilie Oană Stadium, Ploiești, Romania	12	Romania	1–0	1–7	2026 FIFA World Cup qualification
2	28 March 2026	San Marino Stadium, Serravalle, San Marino	13	Faroe Islands	1–0	1–2	Friendly
3	5 June 2026	San Marino Stadium, Serravalle, San Marino	15	Bangladesh	1–1	1–2	Friendly
