= UEFA Euro 2024 qualifying Group H =

Group H of UEFA Euro 2024 qualifying was one of the ten groups to decide which teams would qualify for the UEFA Euro 2024 final tournament in Germany. Group H consisted of six teams: Denmark, Finland, Kazakhstan, Northern Ireland, San Marino and Slovenia. The teams played against each other home-and-away in a round-robin format.

The top two teams, Denmark and Slovenia, qualified directly for the final tournament. The participants of the qualifying play-offs were decided based on their performance in the 2022–23 UEFA Nations League.

== Standings ==
Pos	Team	Pld	W	D	L	GF	GA	GD	Pts	Qualification	(Denmark)	(Slovenia)	(Finland)	(Kazakhstan)	(Northern Ireland)	(San Marino)
1	Denmark	10	7	1	2	19	10	+9	22 (Note: Head to head points: Denmark 4, Slovenia 1.)	Qualify for final tournament	—	2–1	3–1	3–1	1–0	4–0
2	Slovenia	10	7	1	2	20	9	+11	22	Qualify for final tournament	1–1	—	3–0	2–1	4–2	2–0
3	Finland	10	6	0	4	18	10	+8	18 (Note: Goal difference in all group matches: Finland +8, Kazakhstan +4.)	Advance to play-offs via Nations League	0–1	2–0	—	1–2	4–0	6–0
4	Kazakhstan	10	6	0	4	16	12	+4	18	Advance to play-offs via Nations League	3–2	1–2	0–1	—	1–0	3–1
5	Northern Ireland	10	3	0	7	9	13	−4	9		2–0	0–1	0–1	0–1	—	3–0
6	San Marino	10	0	0	10	3	31	−28	0		1–2	0–4	1–2	0–3	0–2	—

Source: UEFA
Rules for classification: Qualification tiebreakers

== Matches ==
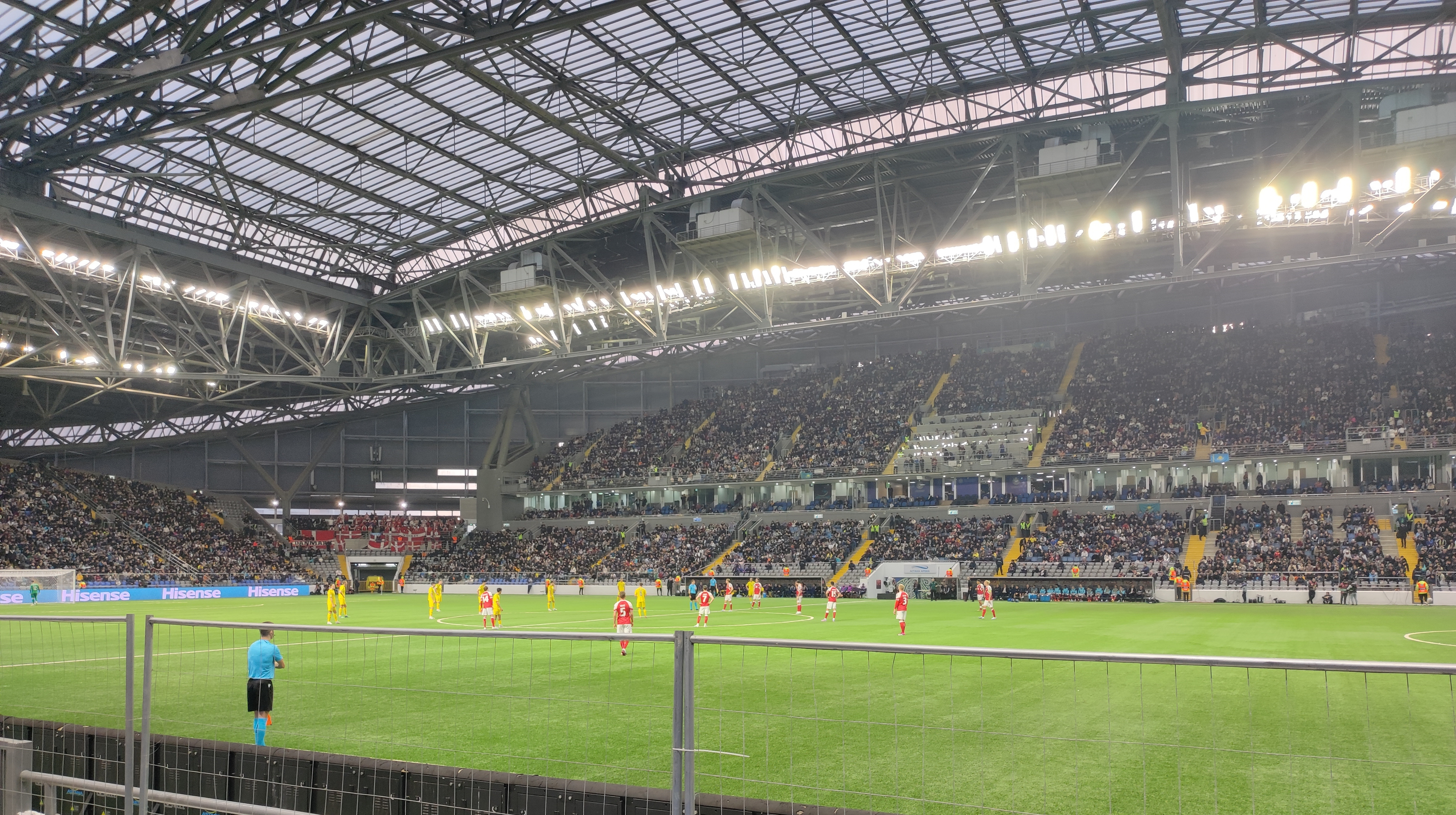
The beginning of the Kazakhstan v Denmark match in Astana Arena, Astana

The fixture list was confirmed by UEFA on 10 October 2022, the day after the draw. Times are CET/CEST, (Note: CET (UTC+1) for matches until 25 March and from 29 October (matchday 1 and 9–10), and CEST (UTC+2) for matches from 26 March to 28 October 2023 (matchday 2–8).) as listed by UEFA (local times, if different, are in parentheses).

23 March 2023
16:00 (21:00 UTC+6)

Kazakhstan	1–2	Slovenia
Samorodov 23'	Report	Brekalo 47'; Vipotnik 78'

Astana Arena, Astana
Attendance: 27,122
Referee: Glenn Nyberg (Sweden)
23 March 2023
20:45

Denmark	3–1	Finland
Højlund 21', 82', 90+3'	Report	Antman 53'

Parken Stadium, Copenhagen
Attendance: 35,851
Referee: Daniel Siebert (Germany)
23 March 2023
20:45

San Marino	0–2	Northern Ireland
	Report	D. Charles 24', 55'

San Marino Stadium, Serravalle
Attendance: 2,099
Referee: Gergő Bogár (Hungary)

26 March 2023
15:00 (19:00 UTC+6)

Kazakhstan	3–2	Denmark
Zaynutdinov 73' (pen.); Tagybergen 86'; Aymbetov 89'	Report	Højlund 21', 35'

Astana Arena, Astana
Attendance: 28,697
Referee: Novak Simović (Serbia)
26 March 2023
18:00

Slovenia	2–0	San Marino
Šeško 56'; Di Maio 60' (o.g.)	Report

Stožice Stadium, Ljubljana
Attendance: 10,282
Referee: Nathan Verboomen (Belgium)
26 March 2023
20:45 (19:45 UTC+1)

Northern Ireland	0–1	Finland
	Report	Källman 28'

Windsor Park, Belfast
Attendance: 17,936
Referee: Ivan Kružliak (Slovakia)

16 June 2023
18:00 (19:00 UTC+3)

Finland	2–0	Slovenia
Pohjanpalo 13'; Antman 64'	Report

Helsinki Olympic Stadium, Helsinki
Attendance: 32,560
Referee: Guillermo Cuadra Fernández (Spain)
16 June 2023
20:45

Denmark	1–0	Northern Ireland
Wind 47'	Report

Parken Stadium, Copenhagen
Attendance: 35,701
Referee: Daniel Stefański (Poland)
16 June 2023
20:45

San Marino	0–3	Kazakhstan
	Report	Vorogovsky 37'; Tagybergen 64' (pen.); Zaynutdinov 90+5'

Stadio Ennio Tardini, Parma (Italy) (Note: The San Marino v Kazakhstan match was played at Stadio Ennio Tardini, Parma, Italy, due to the redevelopment of the San Marino's regular stadium San Marino Stadium, Serravalle.)
Attendance: 528
Referee: Anastasios Papapetrou (Greece)

19 June 2023
18:00 (19:00 UTC+3)

Finland	6–0	San Marino
Kamara 16'; Källman 39'; Håkans 65', 72', 74'; Pukki 76'	Report

Helsinki Olympic Stadium, Helsinki
Attendance: 32,812
Referee: Genc Nuza (Kosovo)
19 June 2023
20:45 (19:45 UTC+1)

Northern Ireland	0–1	Kazakhstan
	Report	Aymbetov 88'

Windsor Park, Belfast
Attendance: 18,002
Referee: Roi Reinshreiber (Israel)
19 June 2023
20:45

Slovenia	1–1	Denmark
Šporar 25'	Report	Højlund 42'

Stožice Stadium, Ljubljana
Attendance: 14,382
Referee: François Letexier (France)

7 September 2023
16:00 (20:00 UTC+6)

Kazakhstan	0–1	Finland
	Report	Antman 78'

Astana Arena, Astana
Attendance: 30,019
Referee: Radu Petrescu (Romania)
7 September 2023
20:45

Denmark	4–0	San Marino
Højbjerg 26'; Mæhle 28'; Wind 40'; Eriksen 90+3'	Report

Parken Stadium, Copenhagen
Attendance: 36,262
Referee: Vitālijs Spasjoņņikovs (Latvia)
7 September 2023
20:45

Slovenia	4–2	Northern Ireland
Šporar 3', 56'; Evans 17' (o.g.); Šeško 42'	Report	Price 7'; Evans 53'

Stožice Stadium, Ljubljana
Attendance: 12,587
Referee: Marco Guida (Italy)

10 September 2023
15:00 (19:00 UTC+6)

Kazakhstan	1–0	Northern Ireland
Samorodov 27'	Report

Astana Arena, Astana
Attendance: 28,458
Referee: Daniel Schlager (Germany)
10 September 2023
18:00 (19:00 UTC+3)

Finland	0–1	Denmark
	Report	Højbjerg 86'

Helsinki Olympic Stadium, Helsinki
Attendance: 32,571
Referee: Szymon Marciniak (Poland)
10 September 2023
20:45

San Marino	0–4	Slovenia
	Report	Vipotnik 4'; Mlakar 16'; Lovrić 61'; Karničnik 67'

San Marino Stadium, Serravalle
Attendance: 844
Referee: Mykola Balakin (Ukraine)

14 October 2023
15:00 (14:00 UTC+1)

Northern Ireland	3–0	San Marino
Smyth 5'; Magennis 11'; McMenamin 81'	Report

Windsor Park, Belfast
Attendance: 17,886
Referee: Bram Van Driessche (Belgium)
14 October 2023
18:00

Slovenia	3–0	Finland
Šeško 16' (pen.), 28'; Janža 90+2'	Report

Stožice Stadium, Ljubljana
Attendance: 15,823
Referee: Daniele Orsato (Italy)
14 October 2023
20:45

Denmark	3–1	Kazakhstan
Wind 36'; Skov 45+1', 48'	Report	Vorogovsky 58'

Parken Stadium, Copenhagen
Attendance: 35,845
Referee: Michael Oliver (England)

17 October 2023
18:00 (19:00 UTC+3)

Finland	1–2	Kazakhstan
Taylor 28'	Report	Zaynutdinov 77' (pen.), 89'

Helsinki Olympic Stadium, Helsinki
Attendance: 30,375
Referee: Irfan Peljto (Bosnia and Herzegovina)
17 October 2023
20:45 (19:45 UTC+1)

Northern Ireland	0–1	Slovenia
	Report	Gnezda Čerin 5'

Windsor Park, Belfast
Attendance: 16,332
Referee: István Kovács (Romania)
17 October 2023
20:45

San Marino	1–2	Denmark
Golinucci 61'	Report	Højlund 42'; Poulsen 70'

San Marino Stadium, Serravalle
Attendance: 2,984
Referee: Viktor Kopiievskyi (Ukraine)

17 November 2023
16:00 (21:00 UTC+6)

Kazakhstan	3–1	San Marino
Chesnokov 19', 51'; Aymbetov 90+2' (pen.)	Report	Franciosi 60'

Astana Arena, Astana
Attendance: 30,100
Referee: Harald Lechner (Austria)
17 November 2023
18:00 (19:00 UTC+2)

Finland	4–0	Northern Ireland
Pohjanpalo 42' (pen.); Håkans 48'; Pukki 74'; Lod 88'	Report

Helsinki Olympic Stadium, Helsinki
Attendance: 28,711
Referee: Aliyar Aghayev (Azerbaijan)
17 November 2023
20:45

Denmark	2–1	Slovenia
Mæhle 26'; Delaney 54'	Report	Janža 30'

Parken Stadium, Copenhagen
Attendance: 35,608
Referee: José María Sánchez Martínez (Spain)

20 November 2023
20:45 (19:45 UTC±0)

Northern Ireland	2–0	Denmark
Price 60'; Charles 81'	Report

Windsor Park, Belfast
Attendance: 17,366
Referee: Jérôme Brisard (France)
20 November 2023
20:45

San Marino	1–2	Finland
Berardi 90+7' (pen.)	Report	Soiri 50', 58'

San Marino Stadium, Serravalle
Attendance: 1,427
Referee: Manfredas Lukjančukas (Lithuania)
20 November 2023
20:45

Slovenia	2–1	Kazakhstan
Šeško 41' (pen.); Verbič 86'	Report	Orazov 48'

Stožice Stadium, Ljubljana
Attendance: 16,432
Referee: Szymon Marciniak (Poland)

== Goalscorers ==
There were 85 goals scored in 30 matches, for an average of 2.83 goals per match.

7 goals

- (Denmark) Rasmus Højlund

5 goals

- (Slovenia) Benjamin Šeško

4 goals

- (Finland) Daniel Håkans
- (Kazakhstan) Bakhtiyar Zaynutdinov

3 goals

- (Denmark) Jonas Wind
- (Finland) Oliver Antman
- (Kazakhstan) Abat Aymbetov
- (Northern Ireland) Dion Charles
- (Slovenia) Andraž Šporar

2 goals

- (Denmark) Pierre-Emile Højbjerg
- (Denmark) Joakim Mæhle
- (Denmark) Robert Skov
- (Finland) Benjamin Källman
- (Finland) Joel Pohjanpalo
- (Finland) Teemu Pukki
- (Finland) Pyry Soiri
- (Kazakhstan) Islam Chesnokov
- (Kazakhstan) Maksim Samorodov
- (Kazakhstan) Askhat Tagybergen
- (Kazakhstan) Yan Vorogovsky
- (Northern Ireland) Isaac Price
- (Slovenia) Erik Janža
- (Slovenia) Žan Vipotnik

1 goal

- (Denmark) Thomas Delaney
- (Denmark) Christian Eriksen
- (Denmark) Yussuf Poulsen
- (Finland) Glen Kamara
- (Finland) Robin Lod
- (Finland) Robert Taylor
- (Kazakhstan) Ramazan Orazov
- (Northern Ireland) Jonny Evans
- (Northern Ireland) Josh Magennis
- (Northern Ireland) Conor McMenamin
- (Northern Ireland) Paul Smyth
- (San Marino) Filippo Berardi
- (San Marino) Simone Franciosi
- (San Marino) Alessandro Golinucci
- (Slovenia) David Brekalo
- (Slovenia) Adam Gnezda Čerin
- (Slovenia) Žan Karničnik
- (Slovenia) Sandi Lovrić
- (Slovenia) Jan Mlakar
- (Slovenia) Benjamin Verbič

1 own goal

- (Northern Ireland) Jonny Evans (against Slovenia)
- (San Marino) Roberto Di Maio (against Slovenia)

== Discipline ==
A player was automatically suspended for the next match for the following offences:

- Receiving a red card (red card suspensions could be extended for serious offences)
- Receiving three yellow cards in three different matches, as well as after fifth and any subsequent yellow card (yellow card suspensions could be carried forward to the play-offs, but not the finals or any other future international matches)

The following suspensions were served during the qualifying matches:

Team	Player	Offence(s)	Suspended for match(es)
Kazakhstan	Nuraly Alip	(yellow card) (yellow-red card) vs Azerbaijan in 2022–23 UEFA Nations League (25 September 2022)	vs Slovenia (23 March 2023)
Kazakhstan	Abat Aymbetov	(yellow card) (yellow-red card) vs Denmark (26 March 2023)	vs San Marino (16 June 2023)
Kazakhstan	Maksim Samorodov	(yellow card) vs Finland (7 September 2023); (yellow card) vs Northern Ireland (10 September 2023); (yellow card) vs Finland (17 October 2023)	vs San Marino (17 November 2023)
Kazakhstan	Islambek Kuat	(yellow card) vs San Marino (16 June 2023); (yellow card) vs Northern Ireland (10 September 2023); (yellow card) vs Finland (17 October 2023)	vs San Marino (17 November 2023)
Northern Ireland	Paddy McNair	(yellow card) vs Denmark (16 June 2023); (yellow card) vs Kazakhstan (10 September 2023); (yellow card) vs San Marino (14 October 2023)	vs Slovenia (17 October 2023)
Northern Ireland	Shea Charles	(yellow card) (yellow-red card) vs Slovenia (17 October 2023)	vs Finland (17 November 2023)
