= Lorenzo Capicchioni =

Sammarinese footballer

Personal information
- Date of birth: 19 January 2002 (age 24)
- Place of birth: San Marino
- Position: Midfielder

Team information
- Current team: Tropical Coriano

Youth career
- –2020: Cesena
- 2020–2021: Rimini

Senior career*
Years	Team	Apps	(Gls)
2020–2021	Rimini	5	(0)
2021–2023	United Riccione	4	(0)
2023	Cosmos	15	(2)
2023–2024	Sammaurese	13	(0)
2024–2025	ASD Asta Taverne		
2025–2026	CBR Carli Pietracuta		
2026–	Tropical Coriano	9	(1)

International career^{‡}
2018	San Marino U17	3	(0)
2022–	San Marino U21	4	(0)
2022–	San Marino	32	(0)
- * Club domestic league appearances and goals as of 5 November 2026 ‡ National team caps and goals as of 15 November 2026

Lorenzo Capicchioni (born 19 January 2002) is a Sammarinese footballer who plays as a midfielder for Serie D club Tropical Coriano and the San Marino national team.

== Career ==
Capicchioni made his international debut for San Marino on 17 November 2022 in a friendly match against Saint Lucia, which finished as a 1–1 away draw.

== Career statistics ==
=== International ===
As of 15 November 2026

San Marino
Year	Apps	Goals
2022	2	0
2023	8	0
2024	4	0
2025	8	0
2026	10	0
Total	32	0

== Personal life ==
Capicchioni is a student of UNIRSM Ingegneria Gestionale which is a University of the Republic of San Marino.
