= Nicola Nanni =

Sammarinese footballer (born 2000)

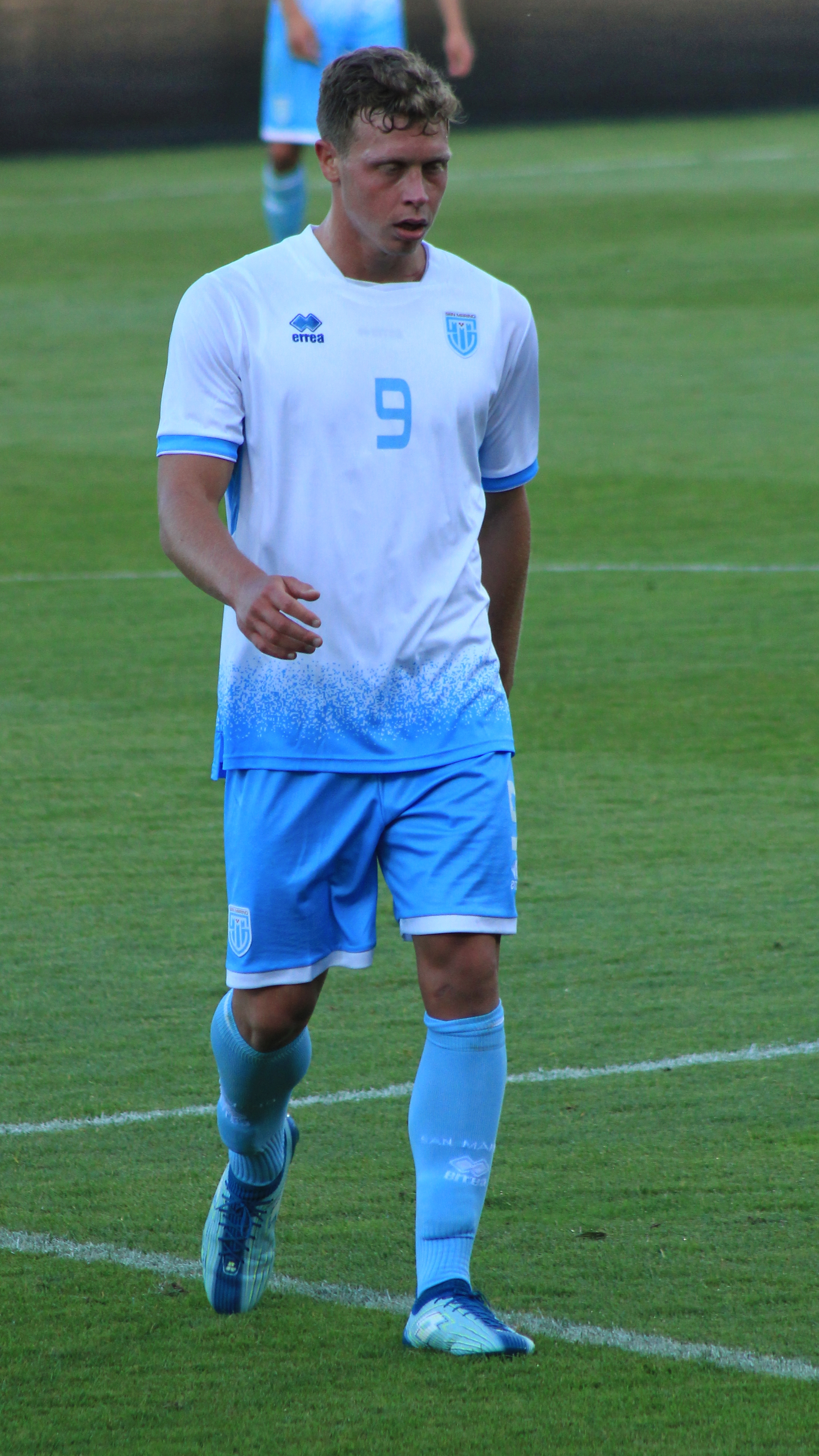
- Nanni with San Marino in 2024

Personal information
- Date of birth: 2 May 2000 (age 26)
- Place of birth: Borgo Maggiore, San Marino
- Height: 1.90 m (6 ft 3 in)
- Position: Forward

Team information
- Current team: Arzignano
- Number: 32

Youth career
- 2006–2016: San Marino Calcio
- 2016–2018: Cesena

Senior career*
| Years | Team | Apps | (Gls) |
| 2018–2022 | Crotone | 0 | (0) |
| 2019–2020 | → Monopoli (loan) | 7 | (0) |
| 2020–2021 | → Cesena (loan) | 23 | (0) |
| 2021–2022 | → Lucchese (loan) | 32 | (2) |
| 2022–2024 | Olbia | 54 | (8) |
| 2024–2025 | Torres | 25 | (4) |
| 2025– | Arzignano | 43 | (12) |

International career^{‡}
| 2015 | San Marino U17 | 3 | (0) |
| 2017 | San Marino U19 | 3 | (0) |
| 2018 | San Marino U21 | 2 | (0) |
| 2018– | San Marino | 60 | (7) |
- * Club domestic league appearances and goals as of 15 November 2026 ‡ National team caps and goals as of 15 November 2026

Nicola Nanni (born 2 May 2000) is a Sammarinese footballer who plays as a forward for Serie C Group A club Arzignano and the San Marino national team. He is considered one of the most experienced Sammarinese football players, along with Massimo Bonini. He is one of only a few professional footballers from San Marino.

== Early life ==
Nanni was born in Borgo Maggiore.

== Club career ==
In July 2016, Nanni joined Cesena from San Marino Calcio for his first move outside of his homeland.

He signed a five-year deal for Crotone of Serie B on 3 August 2018. Three days later he made his professional debut during a 4–0 victory against Giana Erminio in the 2018–19 Coppa Italia. On 29 August 2019, he joined Monopoli on loan.

Nanni received the 2019 San Marino Golden Boy Award, an honour given to the best San Marino footballer under the age of 23.

On 23 September 2020, he returned to Cesena on loan. Nanni was loaned out again, this time to Lucchese 1905 of Serie C, in August 2021 for the 2021–22 season.

On 15 July 2022, Nanni signed a two-year contract with Olbia in Serie C.

On 6 September 2024, Nanni joined Serie C club Torres.

== International career ==
Nanni made his senior national team debut on 15 November 2018 in a 2018–19 UEFA Nations League D match against Moldova.

He scored his first senior international goal on 5 September 2021 in a 2022 FIFA World Cup qualification match against Poland. Though San Marino ultimately lost 7–1, Nanni's goal was his nation's first home goal in World Cup qualification in eight years.

On 15 November 2024, during a 2024–25 UEFA Nations League D game against Gibraltar, he scored his second goal (on a penalty) with San Marino, an equalizer which enabled his country to draw against Gibraltar 1-1, thus becoming the fourth Sammarinese ever to score more than one goal after Andy Selva, Manuel Marani and Filippo Berardi.

Three days later on 18 November 2024, during a UEFA Nations League D game against Liechtenstein, he scored his third goal for San Marino on a penalty, thus becoming the first Sammarinese to score in two consecutive games and the third ever to score more than two goals. The game resulted in a 3–1 win which saw San Marino get promoted to League C of the 2026–27 UEFA Nations League.

On 15 November 2026, Nicola Nanni scored twice in a 7–2 defeat to Finland, marking the first time a Sammarinese had scored a brace in an international match.

== Career statistics ==
=== Club ===
As of match played 15 November 2026

Appearances and goals by club, season and competition
| Club | Season | League | | | Coppa Italia | | Other | | Total | |
| Club | Season | Division | Apps | Goals | Apps | Goals | Apps | Goals | Apps | Goals |
|---|---|---|---|---|---|---|---|---|---|---|
| Crotone | 2018–19 | Serie B | 0 | 0 | 1 | 0 | — | | 1 | 0 |
| Crotone | 2019–20 | Serie B | 0 | 0 | 1 | 0 | — | | 1 | 0 |
| Crotone | Total | | 0 | 0 | 2 | 0 | — | | 2 | 0 |
| Monopoli (loan) | 2019–20 | Serie C | 7 | 0 | 0 | 0 | 0 | 0 | 7 | 0 |
| Cesena (loan) | 2020–21 | Serie C | 23 | 0 | — | | 0 | 0 | 23 | 0 |
| Lucchese (loan) | 2021–22 | Serie C | 31 | 2 | — | | 1 (Note: Appearance(s) in Serie C Promotion play-offs) | 0 | 32 | 2 |
| Olbia | 2022–23 | Serie C | 21 | 4 | — | | — | | 21 | 4 |
| Olbia | 2023–24 | Serie C | 33 | 4 | — | | — | | 33 | 4 |
| Olbia | Total | | 54 | 8 | — | | — | | 54 | 8 |
| Torres | 2024–25 | Serie C | 10 | 1 | — | | — | | 10 | 1 |
| Arzignano | 2025–26 | Serie C | 32 | 7 | — | | 4 (Note: Three appearances, two goals in Coppa Italia Serie C; one appearance, one goal in Serie C Promotion play-offs) | 3 | 36 | 10 |
| Arzignano | 2026–27 | Serie C | 11 | 5 | — | | 1 (Note: Appearance in Coppa Italia Serie C) | 0 | 12 | 5 |
| Arzignano | Total | | 43 | 12 | — | | 5 | 3 | 48 | 15 |
| Career total | | | 97 | 20 | 2 | 0 | 6 | 3 | 176 | 26 |

=== International ===
As of match played 15 November 2026

Appearances and goals by national team and year
| National team | Year | Apps | Goals |
|---|---|---|---|
| San Marino | 2018 | 2 | 0 |
| San Marino | 2019 | 8 | 0 |
| San Marino | 2020 | 3 | 0 |
| San Marino | 2021 | 11 | 1 |
| San Marino | 2022 | 3 | 0 |
| San Marino | 2023 | 7 | 0 |
| San Marino | 2024 | 8 | 2 |
| San Marino | 2025 | 9 | 1 |
| San Marino | 2026 | 9 | 3 |
| Total | | 60 | 7 |

Scores and results list San Marino's goal tally first, score column indicates score after each Nanni goal.

List of international goals scored by Nicola Nanni
| No. | Date | Venue | Opponent | Score | Result | Competition |
|---|---|---|---|---|---|---|
| 1 | 5 September 2021 | San Marino Stadium, Serravalle, San Marino | Poland | 1–4 | 1–7 | 2022 FIFA World Cup qualification |
| 2 | 15 November 2024 | San Marino Stadium, Serravalle, San Marino | Gibraltar | 1–1 | 1–1 | 2024–25 UEFA Nations League D |
| 3 | 18 November 2024 | Rheinpark Stadion, Vaduz, Liechtenstein | Liechtenstein | 2–1 | 3–1 | 2024–25 UEFA Nations League D |
| 4 | 9 September 2025 | National Stadium, Ta'Qali, Malta | Malta | 1–3 | 1–3 | Friendly |
| 5 | 9 June 2026 | Haladás Sportkomplexum, Szombathely, Hungary | Azerbaijan | 1–0 | 1–2 | Friendly |
| 6 | 15 November 2026 | Töölö Football Stadium, Helsinki, Finland | Finland | 1–3 | 2–7 | 2026–27 UEFA Nations League C |
| 7 | 15 November 2026 | Töölö Football Stadium, Helsinki, Finland | Finland | 2–6 | 2–7 | 2026–27 UEFA Nations League C |

== Honours ==
Individual

- San Marino Golden Boy Award: 2019
