= Vitaioli =

Vitaioli is a surname. Notable people with the surname include:

- Fabio Vitaioli (born 1984), Sanmarinese footballer
- Matteo Vitaioli (born 1989), Sanmarinese footballer
