= Simone Franciosi =

Sammarinese footballer

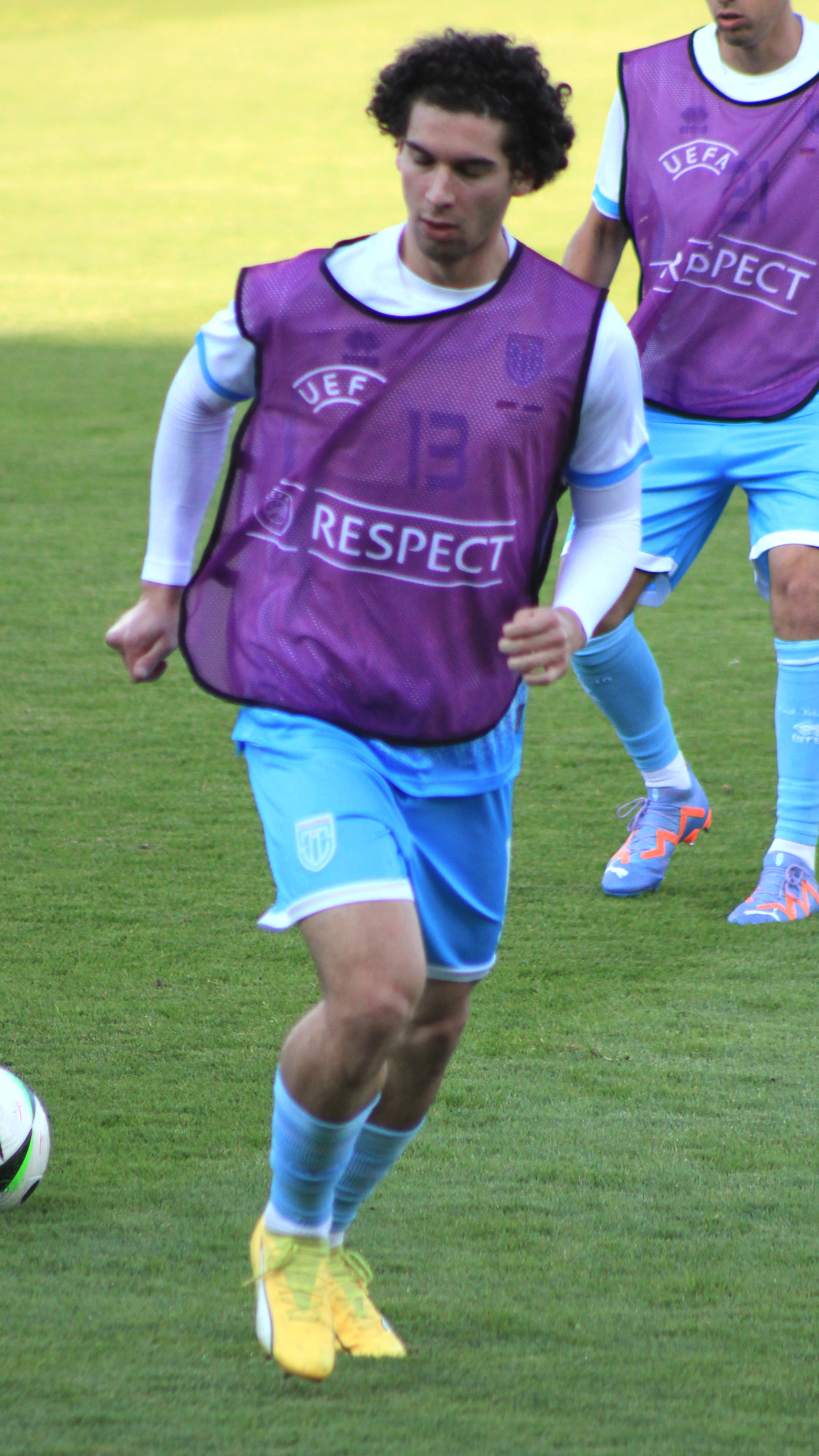
- Franciosi with San Marino against Slovakia (2024)

Personal information
- Full name: Simone Franciosi
- Date of birth: 3 September 2001 (age 25)
- Place of birth: San Marino
- Position: Defender

Team information
- Current team: Artella

Youth career
- –2019: San Marino Academy

Senior career*
Years	Team	Apps	(Gls)
2019–2021	A.C.D. Torconca		
2021	Juvenes/Dogana	7	(0)
2021–2022	A.C.D. Torconca		
2022–2023	A.S.D. Valfoglia		
2023–2024	Pietracuta		
2024–	Artella		

International career^{‡}
2017	San Marino U17	3	(0)
2018–2019	San Marino U19	6	(0)
2019–2022	San Marino U21	16	(0)
2022–	San Marino	10	(1)
- * Club domestic league appearances and goals as of 5 June 2026 ‡ National team caps and goals as of 14 October 2024

Simone Franciosi (born 3 September 2001) is a Sammarinese footballer who plays as a defender for Artella in Italy and the San Marino national team.

== Career ==
Franciosi made his international debut for San Marino on 26 September 2022 in a UEFA Nations League match against Estonia, which finished as a 0–4 home loss. He scored his first international goal in a 1–3 defeat against Kazakhstan on 17 November 2023.

== Career statistics ==
=== International ===
As of 14 October 2024

San Marino
Year	Apps	Goals
2022	2	0
2023	7	1
2024	1	0
Total	10	1

=== International goals ===
As of match played 17 November 2023. San Marino score listed first, score column indicates score after each Franciosi goal.

== Personal life ==
Franciosi is a student by day.

International goals by date, venue, cap, opponent, score, result and competition
No.	Date	Venue	Cap	Opponent	Score	Result	Competition
1	17 November 2023	Astana Arena, Astana, Kazakhstan	8	Kazakhstan	1–2	1–3	UEFA Euro 2024 qualifying
