= Lorenzo Lazzari (footballer) =

Sammarinese footballer (born 2003)

Personal information
- Date of birth: 6 June 2003 (age 23)
- Height: 1.80 m (5 ft 11 in)
- Position: Midfielder

Team information
- Current team: Tropical Coriano
- Number: 10

Youth career
- –2022: San Marino Academy

Senior career*
Years	Team	Apps	(Gls)
2022–2024	Victor San Marino	49	(5)
2024–2026	Pietracuta	39	(4)
2026–	Tropical Coriano	4	(0)

International career^{‡}
2019	San Marino U16	3	(0)
2018–2019	San Marino U17	5	(0)
2021	San Marino U19	3	(0)
2022–2023	San Marino U21	4	(0)
2022–	San Marino	30	(3)
- * Club domestic league appearances and goals as of 31 May 2025 ‡ National team caps and goals as of 19:27, 15 November 2026 (CET)

Lorenzo Lazzari (Italian pronunciation: [loˈrɛntso ˈladdzari]; born 6 June 2003) is a Sammarinese footballer who plays as a midfielder for Italian club Tropical Coriano and the San Marino national team.

== Club career ==
Having played at youth level for San Marino Academy, Lazzari joined Victor San Marino, a Sammarinese club playing in the Eccellenza (Italian fifth-tier), ahead of the 2022–23 season.

On 8 December 2022, he scored his first league goal, netting a volley from outside the box in a 5–2 win over Sanpaimola. On 16 March 2023, Victor San Marino extended Lazzari's contract until June 2026. With five goals in 28 games, Lazzari helped his club gain promotion to Serie D for the 2023–24 season.

== International career ==
On 17 November 2022, aged 19, Lazzari made his international debut for San Marino in a friendly against Saint Lucia, coming on as a substitute. During the same game, Lazzari scored a 93rd-minute equalizer to draw the game 1–1. He was the youngest player in San Marino's team, and his goal was his nation's fifth in as many years. In the process, Lazzari also became San Marino's second-youngest goalscorer, at 19 years, 164 days, behind only Alex Gasperoni.

On 18 November 2024, during a UEFA Nations League D game against Liechtenstein, he scored his second goal for his country, becoming the fifth and youngest Sammarinese to score more than one goal.

== Style of play ==
Lazzari has been compared to former Sammarinese footballer Massimo Bonini, due to similarities in their respective positions and styles of play. Being a midfielder, he has been regarded for his ball-winning skills.

== Personal life ==
Lazzari's nickname, "Lello", was originally given to him by his younger sister, who could not pronounce his first name, "Lorenzo", as a child. He has pursued university studies.

== Career statistics ==
=== International ===
As of match played 15 November 2026

Appearances and goals by national team and year
National team	Year	Apps	Goals
San Marino	2022	2	1
San Marino	2023	9	0
San Marino	2024	5	1
San Marino	2025	5	0
San Marino	2026	9	1
Total		30	3

Scores and results list San Marino's goal tally first, score column indicates score after each Lazzari goal.

List of international goals scored by Lorenzo Lazzari
No.	Date	Venue	Opponent	Score	Result	Competition
1	17 November 2022	Daren Sammy Cricket Ground, Gros Islet, Saint Lucia	Saint Lucia	1–1	1–1	Friendly
2	18 November 2024	Rheinpark Stadion, Vaduz, Liechtenstein	Liechtenstein	1–1	3–1	2024–25 UEFA Nations League D
3	6 October 2026	Arena Kombëtare, Tirana, Albania	Albania	1–1	1–2	2026–27 UEFA Nations League C
