= Marco Pasolini =

Sammarinese footballer

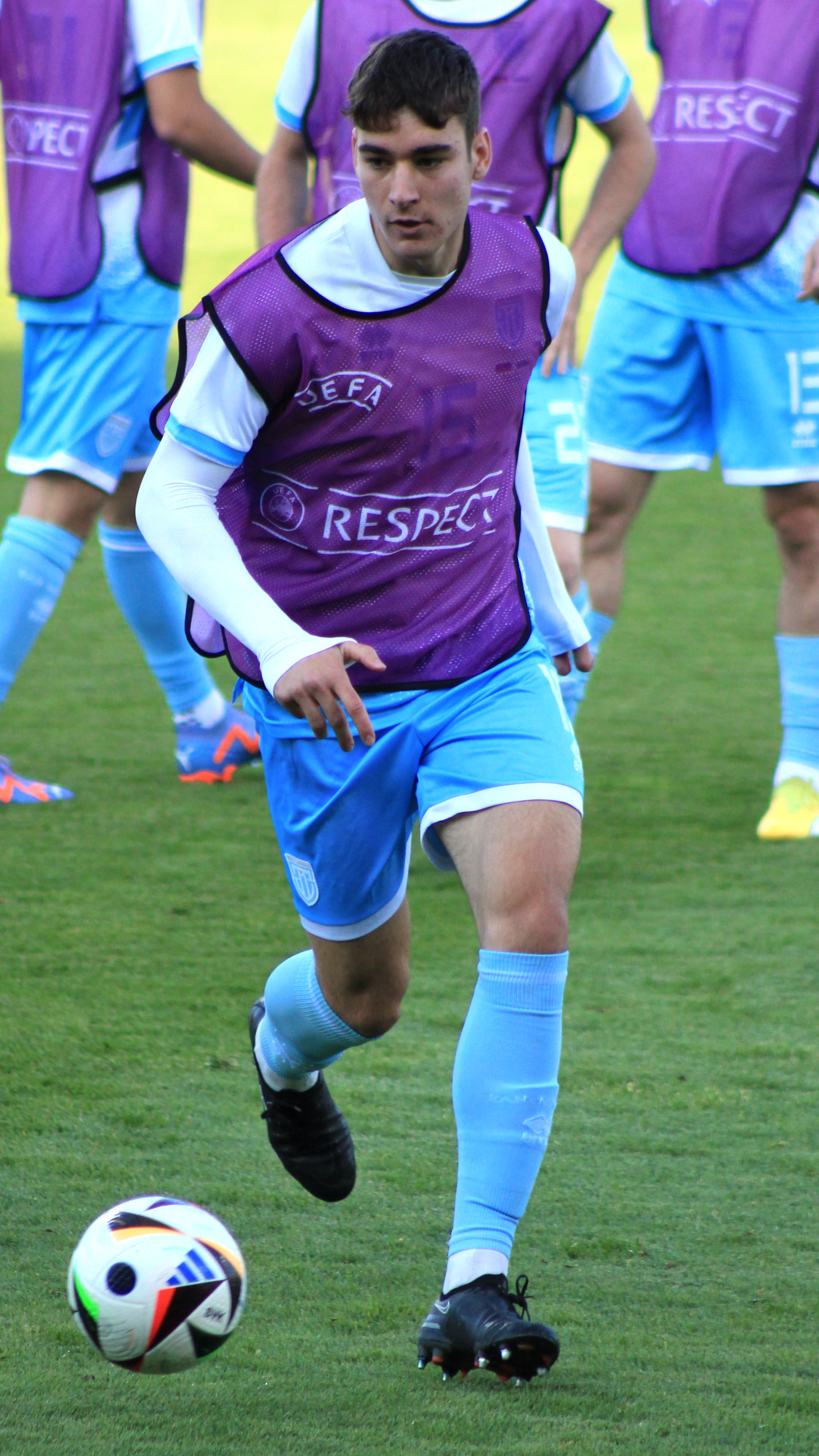
- Pasolini with San Marino against Slovakia (2024)

Personal information
- Date of birth: 6 April 2003 (age 23)
- Position: Centre-back

Team information
- Current team: Tropical Coriano

Youth career
- –2022: San Marino Academy

Senior career*
Years	Team	Apps	(Gls)
2022–2023	Sammaurese	0	(0)
2023–2026	CBR Carli Pietracuta		
2026–	Tropical Coriano	3	(1)

International career^{‡}
2019	San Marino U17	3	(0)
2021	San Marino U19	4	(0)
2022–2023	San Marino U21	5	(0)
2024–	San Marino	14	(0)
- * Club domestic league appearances and goals as of 5 November 2026 ‡ National team caps and goals as of 15 November 2026

Marco Pasolini (born 26 April 2003) is a Sammarinese football player who plays as a centre-back for Serie D club Tropical Coriano and the San Marino national team.

== International career ==
Pasolini made his debut for the senior San Marino national team on 20 March 2024 in a friendly against St. Kitts and Nevis.
