= Andrea Contadini =

Sammarinese footballer

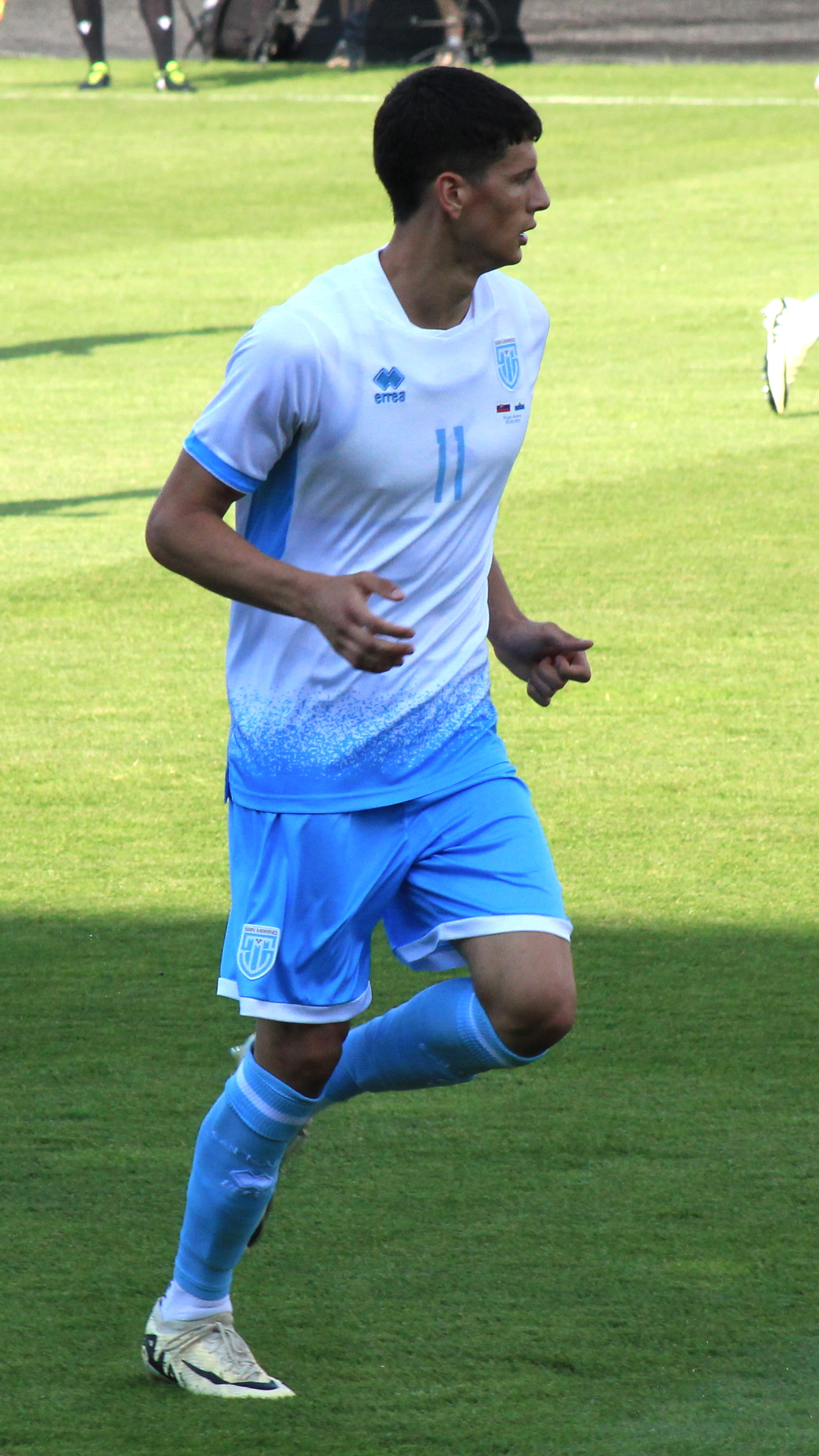
- Contadini with San Marino against Slovakia (2024)

Personal information
- Date of birth: 18 August 2002 (age 24)
- Position: Left-back

Team information
- Current team: Tropical Coriano

Senior career*
Years	Team	Apps	(Gls)
2020–2026	CBR Carli Pietracuta		
2021	→ Fiorentino (loan)	10	(0)
2026–	Tropical Coriano	0	(0)

International career^{‡}
2017–2018	San Marino U17	6	(0)
2019	San Marino U19	3	(0)
2020–	San Marino U21	17	(0)
2024–	San Marino	20	(0)
- * Club domestic league appearances and goals as of 5 November 2026 ‡ National team caps and goals as of 15 November 2026

Andrea Contadini (born 18 August 2002) is a Sammarinese football player who plays as a left-back for Serie D club Tropical Coriano and the San Marino national team.

== International career ==
Contadini made his debut for the senior San Marino national team on 20 March 2024 in a friendly against St. Kitts and Nevis.
