= Marcello Mularoni =

Sammarinese footballer (born 1998)

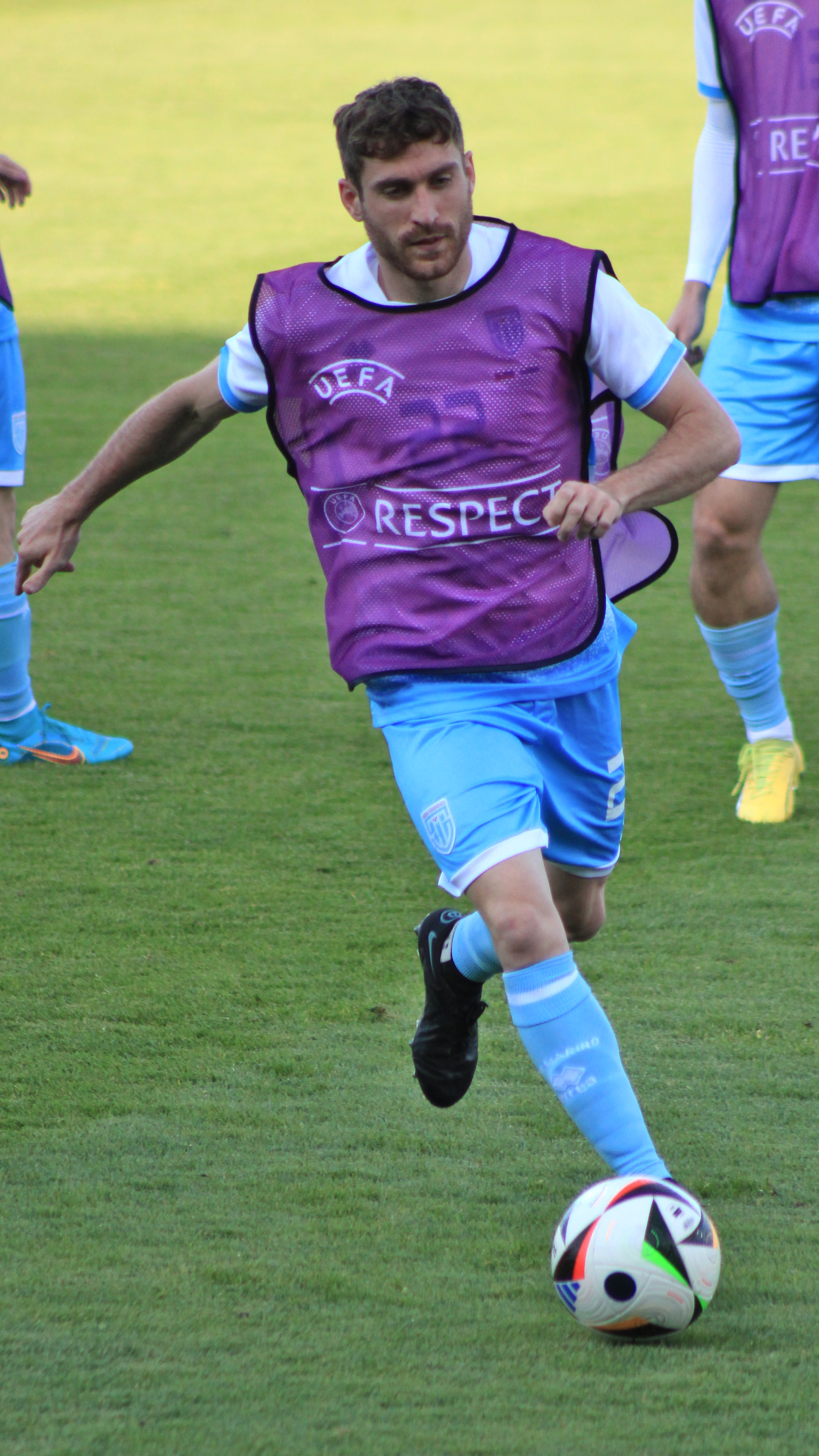
- Mularoni with San Marino against Slovakia (2024)

Personal information
- Full name: Marcello Mularoni
- Date of birth: 8 September 1998 (age 28)
- Place of birth: San Marino
- Position: Centre midfielder

Team information
- Current team: Cosmos
- Number: 8

Senior career*
Years	Team	Apps	(Gls)
2016–2017	Savignanese	0	(0)
2017–2018	Pietracuta	0	(0)
2018–2020	Faetano	0	(0)
2020–2021	La Fiorita	11	(1)
2021–2023	Tropical Coriano		
2023–	Cosmos	89	(3)

International career^{‡}
2013–2014	San Marino U-17	5	(0)
2015–2016	San Marino U-19	4	(0)
2017–	San Marino U-21	11	(0)
2018–	San Marino	58	(0)
- * Club domestic league appearances and goals as of 5 June 2026 ‡ National team caps and goals as of 3 October 2026

Marcello Mularoni (born 8 September 1998) is a Sanmarinese football player who plays as a midfielder for Cosmos.

== Career ==
Mularoni debuted with the senior national team on 11 October 2018 in a 2018–19 UEFA Nations League match against Moldova.

== Personal life ==
Mularoni works as a business consultant while also playing football.
