= Alberto Riccardi =

Sammarinese footballer

Personal information
- Date of birth: 1 October 2006 (age 20)
- Place of birth: San Marino
- Height: 1.81 m (5 ft 11 in)
- Position: Defender

Team information
- Current team: Tropical Coriano

Youth career
- –2023: San Marino Academy

Senior career*
Years	Team	Apps	(Gls)
2023–2025	San Marino Academy	19	(4)
2025	→ La Fiorita (loan)	15	(1)
2025	Imolese	11	(0)
2025–	Tropical Coriano	8	(1)

International career^{‡}
2022	San Marino U16	3	(0)
2022	San Marino U17	3	(0)
2023–2024	San Marino U19	4	(0)
2024	San Marino U21	2	(0)
2025–	San Marino	10	(0)
- * Club domestic league appearances and goals as of 5 June 2026 ‡ National team caps and goals as of 5 June 2026

Alberto Riccardi (born 1 October 2006) is a Sammarinese footballer who plays as a defender for Italian Serie D club Tropical Coriano and the San Marino national team.

== Career ==
=== Club ===
Raised in the youth sector of the San Marino Academy, he made his debut in the first team on 1 October 2023 in the Campionato Sammarinese against Pennarossa that the Academy won 4-0. In 2024, he was loaned to La Fiorita.

Riccardi signed with Imolese in the Italian fourth-tier during the summer of 2025.

=== International ===
He played in the San Marino youth national teams at the Under-16, Under-17, Under-19 and Under-21 levels, and made his debut with the San Marino senior national team on 24 March 2025 in a qualifying match for the 2026 FIFA World Cup against Romania.

== Career statistics ==
=== International ===
As of 5 June 2026

San Marino
Year	Apps	Goals
2025	8	0
2026	2	0
Total	10	0

== Awards ==
- San Marino Football Federation Golden Boy: 1 (2025)
