= Fabio Vitaioli =

Sammarinese footballer

Personal information
- Full name: Fabio Vitaioli
- Date of birth: April 5, 1984 (age 42)
- Place of birth: San Marino
- Height: 1.80 m (5 ft 11 in)
- Position: Defender

Senior career*
Years	Team	Apps	(Gls)
2007–2008	Murata	3	(0)
2008–2009	Olympia Secchiano		
2009–2011	Murata	14	(0)
2011–2014	Sammaurese		
2014	Murata	1	(0)
2014–2016	Tropical Coriano		
2016–2017	Libertas	2	(0)
2017–2021	Tropical Coriano		
2021–2024	Murata	61	(0)
Total		81	(0)

International career^{‡}
2007–2019	San Marino	55	(0)
- * Club domestic league appearances and goals as of 5 June 2026 ‡ National team caps and goals as of 21 November 2019

Fabio Vitaioli (born 5 April 1984) is a retired Sammarinese footballer who last played for Murata and was capped 55 times by the San Marino national football team.

== International career ==
Vitaioli made his senior international debut on 2 June 2007 in a 6–0 defeat to Germany in Euro 2008 qualifying.

== Personal life ==
His brother Matteo Vitaioli played alongside him for the San Marino national football team. Alongside playing football, Vitaioli also holds a day job as a graphic designer.
