= Nicko Sensoli =

Sammarinese footballer (born 2005)

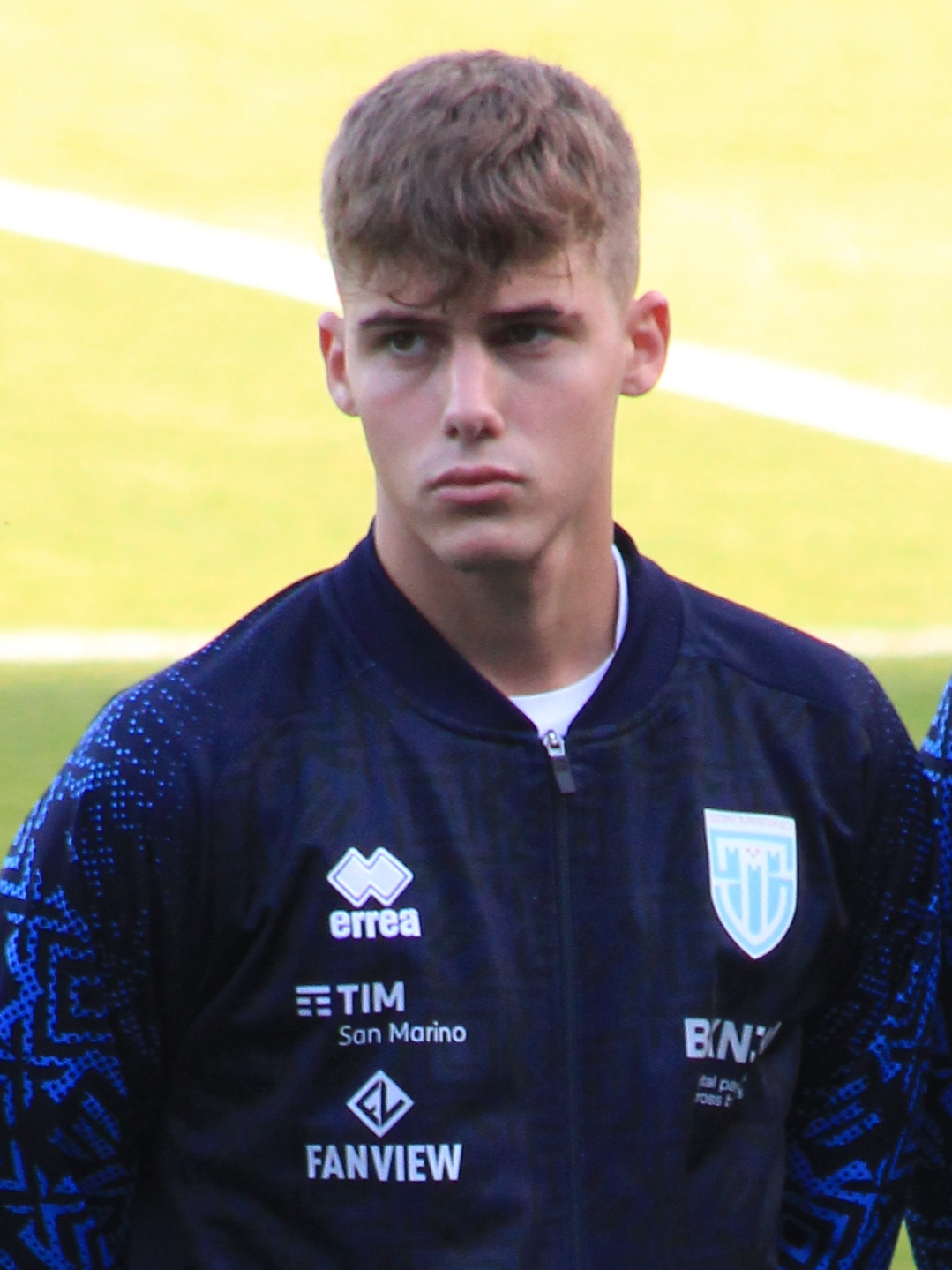
- Sensoli with San Marino in 2024

Personal information
- Date of birth: 14 June 2005 (age 21)
- Place of birth: City of San Marino, San Marino
- Height: 1.78 m (5 ft 10 in)
- Position: Midfielder

Team information
- Current team: Tre Fiori
- Number: 22

Youth career
- –2023: San Marino Academy

Senior career*
Years	Team	Apps	(Gls)
2023–2024	San Marino Academy	10	(4)
2023–2024	→ Sangiuliano (loan)	6	(0)
2024–2025	San Marino	3	(0)
2025–	Tre Fiori	31	(6)

International career^{‡}
2021	San Marino U17	3	(0)
2022	San Marino U19	2	(0)
2023–	San Marino U21	5	(0)
2024–	San Marino	15	(1)
- * Club domestic league appearances and goals as of 5 June 2026 ‡ National team caps and goals as of 13 November 2025

Nicko Sensoli (born 14 June 2005) is a Sammarinese footballer who plays as a midfielder for Sammarinese club Tre Fiori, and the San Marino national team. He scored his first international goal, and San Marino's first ever goal in the UEFA Nations League, in September 2024.

== Club career ==
Born in 2005, he plays as a midfielder but can also play as a second striker. He played for the Academy San Marino, with whom he scored 4 goals in 9 games in the San Marino championship prior to 28 December 2023, when Sensoli joined Serie D club Sangiuliano on loan.

== International career ==
Sensoli made four appearances for the San Marino national under-21 football team prior to receiving his first call-up for the senior San Marino national team. He made his senior international debut on 20 March 2024 in a friendly against Saint Kitts and Nevis.

On 5 September 2024, during the 2024–25 UEFA Nations League D match against Liechtenstein, he scored San Marino first ever goal in UEFA Nations League and his first goal for his country, when he intercepted an errant back header aimed towards the Liechtenstein goalkeeper, leading to the first ever competitive win in Sammarinese history and second win overall ever, and becoming at 19 years and 2 months his country’s youngest goalscorer in a competitive game and second youngest overall behind Alex Gasperoni who was 19 years and 1 month when he scored against Liechtenstein in 2003. Sensoli had not even yet been born on the occasion of San Marino's one previous match victory, 20 years previously.

== Career statistics ==
=== International ===
As of 13 November 2025

San Marino
Year	Apps	Goals
2024	9	1
2025	6	0
Total	15	1

=== International goals ===
As of match played 24 March 2025. San Marino score listed first, score column indicates score after each Sensoli goal.

International goals by date, venue, cap, opponent, score, result and competition
No.	Date	Venue	Cap	Opponent	Score	Result	Competition
1	5 September 2024	San Marino Stadium, Serravalle, San Marino	4	Liechtenstein	1–0	1–0	2024-25 UEFA Nations League D
