= Fausto Salicioni =

Sammarinese footballer (born 2006)

Personal information
- Full name: Fausto Marino Salicioni Ortiz
- Date of birth: 20 January 2006 (age 20)
- Place of birth: Viedma, Argentina
- Height: 1.81 m (5 ft 11 in)
- Position: Forward

Team information
- Current team: Tropical Coriano

Youth career
- –2025: San Lorenzo
- 2025–2026: Virtus Entella

Senior career*
Years	Team	Apps	(Gls)
2026–	Tropical Coriano	5	(0)

International career^{‡}
2025–	San Marino U21	2	(0)
2025–	San Marino	7	(0)
- * Club domestic league appearances and goals as of 5 November 2026 ‡ National team caps and goals as of 12 November 2026

Fausto Marino Salicioni Ortiz (born 20 January 2006) is a professional footballer who plays as a forward for Serie D club Tropical Coriano. Born in Argentina, he plays for the San Marino national team.

== Early life ==
Salicioni was born on 20 January 2006. Born in Viedma, Argentina, he is of Sammarinese descent through his great-grandfather.

== Club career ==
As a youth player, Salicioni joined the youth academy of Argentine side San Lorenzo. Following his stint there, he joined the youth academy of Italian side Virtus Entella in 2022.

Salicioni signed for Tropical Coriano in the fourth-tier in the summer of 2026.

== International career ==
Salicioni is a San Marino international. During the autumn of 2025, he played for the San Marino national under-21 football team for 2027 UEFA European Under-21 Championship qualification.

== Style of play ==
Salicioni plays as a forward. Argentine news website NoticiasNet wrote in 2025 that he has "a remarkable physical presence... standing at 1.80 meters tall".
