= Roberto Di Maio =

Sammarinese footballer

Personal information
- Date of birth: 21 September 1982 (age 44)
- Place of birth: Naples, Italy
- Height: 1.88 m (6 ft 2 in)
- Position: Centre back

Senior career*
Years	Team	Apps	(Gls)
2000–2001	Castelfranco	10	(0)
2001–2002	Castelnuovo	1	(0)
2002–2003	Venturina	29	(1)
2003–2004	Versilia	30	(3)
2004–2008	San Marino	121	(10)
2008–2010	Catanzaro	63	(10)
2010–2012	Nocerina	66	(7)
2012–2013	Lecce	22	(0)
2013–2013	L'Aquila	5	(0)
2014	Torres	17	(1)
2014–2016	Rimini	13	(0)
2016	Gubbio	12	(1)
2016	Matelica	13	(3)
2017	Correggese	8	(1)
2017–2018	San Marino	33	(3)
2018–2022	La Fiorita	80	(9)
2022–2024	Cosmos	61	(3)
Total		584	(52)

International career
2023–2024	San Marino	9	(0)

Managerial career
- 2025–2026: San Marino Academy
- 2025–: San Marino U19
- 2026–: Tropical Coriano
- * Club domestic league appearances and goals

Roberto Di Maio (born 21 September 1982) is a former professional footballer who played as a centre back. He is currently as a head coach for Italian Serie D club Tropical Coriano and San Marino U19 national team.

== Club career ==
On 30 August 2010, Di Maio joined Nocerina for an undisclosed fee.

On 12 August 2013, he left Lecce for L'Aquila.

On 5 June 2024, at the age of almost 42, he announced his retirement from the pitch, aiming for a training career.

== International career ==
Di Maio was born in Naples, Italy, but had indicated that he would be likely to accept a call-up for San Marino national football team if asked. He would eventually earn his first international cap for San Marino on 23 March 2023 in a Euro 2024 qualifier against Northern Ireland, at the age of 40, after waiting the prerequisite 15 years for naturalized citizens who cannot claim ancestral roots to be eligible for La Serenissima. Di Maio had begun the naturalization process during his first stint with San Marino Calcio. His first cap made him the oldest person to make his senior debut in a UEFA competition.

== Personal life ==
De Maio married his wife, Cristina, in 2012, and after ten years of marriage, qualified for Sammarinese citizenship. He works as an academy coach for the San Marino Football Federation, coaching the country's Under-17s team.

== Career statistics ==
As of 17 November 2023

San Marino
Year	Apps	Goals
2023	9	0
Total	9	0
