= Matteo Vitaioli =

Sammarinese footballer (born 1989)

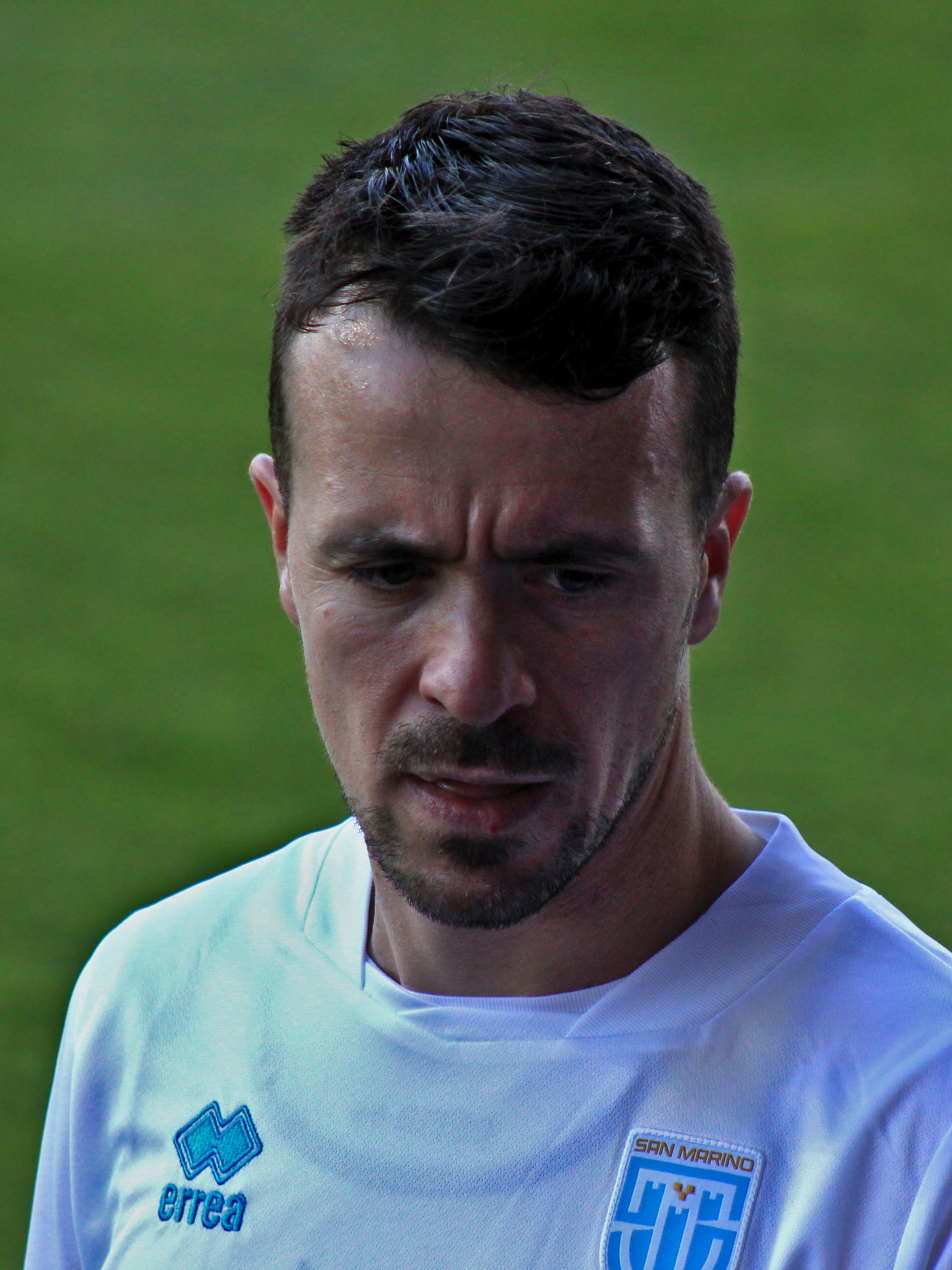
- Vitaioli with San Marino in 2024

Personal information
- Full name: Matteo Giampaolo Vitaioli
- Date of birth: 27 October 1989 (age 37)
- Place of birth: Fiorentino, San Marino
- Height: 6 ft 2 in (1.88 m)
- Position: Midfielder

Team information
- Current team: La Fiorita
- Number: 7

Youth career
- 1996–1998: Montevito
- 1998–1999: Tre Fiori
- 1999–2005: San Marino Calcio

Senior career*
Years	Team	Apps	(Gls)
2005–2006	San Marino Calcio	2	(0)
2006	→ Empoli (loan)	0	(0)
2006–2007	San Marino Calcio	2	(0)
2007–2008	→ ASD Cagliese (loan)	26	(1)
2008–2009	→ Real Montecchio (loan)	30	(6)
2009–2010	San Marino Calcio	1	(0)
2010	→ P.D. Castellarano (loan)	17	(2)
2010–2012	San Marino Calcio	18	(0)
2012	F.C. Fiorentino	1	(0)
2013–2014	Sammaurese	49	(18)
2014–2021	Tropical Coriano	175	(102)
2021	Pennarossa	3	(0)
2021–2022	Tropical Coriano	17	(3)
2022–	La Fiorita	97	(28)

International career^{‡}
2007–	San Marino	100	(1)
- * Club domestic league appearances and goals as of 5 June 2026 ‡ National team caps and goals as of 18 November 2025

Matteo Giampaolo Vitaioli (born 27 October 1989) is a Sammarinese footballer who plays for La Fiorita as a midfielder. In 2007, he became the youngest ever player for the San Marino national football team. In 2022, he became the most capped footballer for the country.

== Club career ==
Born in Fiorentino, San Marino, Vitaioli has represented four clubs on a permanent basis: San Marino Calcio, F.C. Fiorentino, Sammaurese and Tropical Coriano and has played for four clubs on loan: Empoli (although he failed to make a single league appearance in the second half of 2005–06 Serie A), ASD Cagliese, Real Montecchio and P.D. Castellarano.

== International career ==
At the age of 17 years-old, he became San Marino's youngest ever international player in 2007. He played for the San Marino national football team as they secured a 0–0 draw against Estonia in 2014. He scored his first goal on 8 September 2015, in a 2–1 defeat in a European Championship qualifier away to Lithuania. It was San Marino's first away goal in 14 years.

He was considered to be one of the most promising young talents in the San Marino national football team, often regarded as a key member of the squad, partnering with Andy Selva and Nicola Ciacci in a three-pronged San Marino attack. By 2024, he had become the captain of the San Marino national team, and in 2022, he became the most capped player in his country’s history with his 74th international appearance against Estonia, overtaking the 73 caps earned by Selva.

On November 18, 2024, he played as San Marino secured promotion from the fourth and bottom tier of the UEFA Nations League with a 3–1 win away against Liechtenstein.

On November 18, 2025, he made his 100th international appearance in a 7–1 defeat to Romania during 2026 FIFA World Cup qualification, becoming the first Sammarinese player to achieve this feat.

== Career statistics ==
=== Club ===
Appearances and goals by club, season and competition
Club	Season	League			National cup		Europe		Other		Total	
Club	Season	Division	Apps	Goals	Apps	Goals	Apps	Goals	Apps	Goals	Apps	Goals
San Marino Calcio	2005–06	Serie C1	2	0	0	0	—		1 (Note: Appearance in Coppa Italia Serie C)	0	3	0
San Marino Calcio	2006–07	Serie C1	2	0	—		—		0	0	2	0
San Marino Calcio	Total		4	0	0	0	0	0	1	0	5	0
Empoli (loan)	2005–06	Serie A	0	0	—		—		—		0	0
Cagliese Calcio (loan)	2007–08	Serie D	26	1	—		—		2 (Note: Appearance in Serie D play-offs)	0	28	1
Real Montecchio (loan)	2008–09	Serie D	30	6	—		—		2	0	32	6
San Marino Calcio	2009–10	Serie C2	1	0	—		—		2	0	3	0
San Marino Calcio	2010–11	Serie C2	14	0	0	0	—		4 (Note: Three appearances; one goal in Coppa Italia Serie C; one appearance in Serie C Promotion play-offs)	1	18	1
San Marino Calcio	2011–12	Serie C2	4	0	—		—		2	0	6	0
San Marino Calcio	Total		19	0	0	0	0	0	8	1	27	1
Castellarano (loan)	2009–10	Serie D	30	6	—		—		2	0	32	6
Fiorentino	2012–13	Campionato Sammarinese	1	0	3	0	—		—		4	0
Sammaurese	2013–14	Eccellenza	27	7	—		—		0	0	27	7
Tropical Coriano	2014–15	Promozione		9	—		—		0	0		
Tropical Coriano	2015–16	Promozione		23	—		—		0	0		
Tropical Coriano	2016–17	Promozione		13	—		—		0	0		
Tropical Coriano	2017–18	Promozione		7	—		—		0	0		
Tropical Coriano	2018–19	Promozione		18	—		—		0	0		
Tropical Coriano	2019–20	Eccellenza	7	4	—		—		0	0		
Tropical Coriano	2020–21	Eccellenza		0	—		—		0	0		
Tropical Coriano	Total			74	0	0	0	0				
Pennarossa	2020–21	Campionato Sammarinese	3	0	—		—		—		3	0
Tropical Coriano	2021–22	Eccellenza	17	3	—		—		0	0	17	3
La Fiorita	2022–23	Campionato Sammarinese	20	6	4	3	0	0	5 (Note: Four appearances; one goal in Campionato Sammarinese play-offs; one appearance in Super Coppa Sammarinese)	1	29	10
La Fiorita	2023–24	Campionato Sammarinese	24	7	6	0	1 (Note: Appearances in UEFA Conference League)	0	4 (Note: Appearances in Campionato Sammarinese play-offs)	0	35	7
La Fiorita	2024–25	Campionato Sammarinese	23	6	2	1	0	0	3 (Note: Two appearances in Campionato Sammarinese play-offs; one appearance in Super Coppa Sammarinese)	0	28	7
La Fiorita	2025–26	Campionato Sammarinese	19	8	4	1	0	0	1	0	24	9
La Fiorita	Total		86	27	16	5	1	0	13	1	116	33
Career total												

=== International ===
==== International goals ====
Scores and results list San Marino's goal tally first.

List of international goals scored by Matteo Vitaioli
No.	Date	Venue	Opponent	Score	Result	Competition
1	8 September 2015	LFF Stadium, Vilnius, Lithuania	Lithuania	1–1	1–2	UEFA Euro 2016 qualifying

== See also ==
- List of men's footballers with 100 or more international caps

== Personal life ==
Vitaioli works as a graphic designer. He has one daughter. His brother Fabio Vitaioli also played alongside him for the San Marino national football team.
