= Roberto Cevoli =

Italian football manager (born 1968)

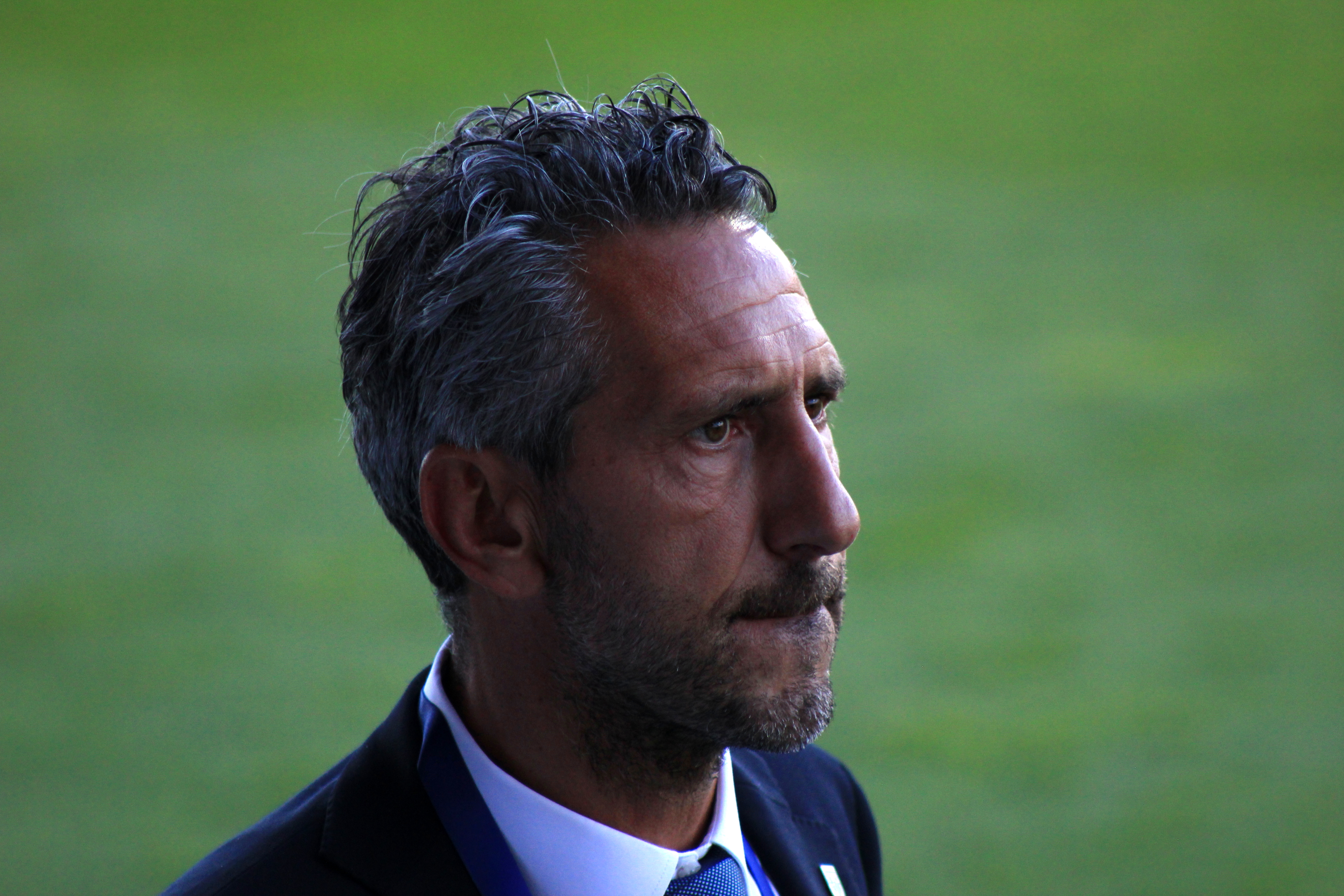
- Cevoli with San Marino in 2024

Personal information
- Date of birth: 29 December 1968 (age 57)
- Place of birth: Rimini, Italy
- Height: 1.94 m (6 ft 4 in)
- Position: Centre-back

Team information
- Current team: San Marino (manager)

Youth career
- Alma Juventus Fano 1906
- SSD Jesina Calcio
- 1522–1990: San Marino Academy

Senior career*
Years	Team	Apps	(Gls)
1990–1991	Jesina	34	(1)
1991–1992	Fano	32	(1)
1992–1993	Carpi	29	(0)
1993–1996	Reggina	103	(4)
1996–1997	Torino	34	(1)
1997–1999	Reggina	51	(2)
1999–2001	Cesena	69	(1)
2001–2004	Modena	92	(2)
2004–2005	Crotone	14	(1)

Managerial career
- 2004–2008: Vicenza (assistant)
- 2008: Foligno
- 2009–2010: Monza
- 2012–2013: Reggina
- 2015–2016: Sanremese
- 2016: Teuta Durrës
- 2017: Civitanovese
- 2017–2018: Renate
- 2018–2019: Reggina
- 2019: Reggina
- 2020: Imolese
- 2021–2022: Renate
- 2022: Novara
- 2023–: San Marino
- * Club domestic league appearances and goals

Roberto Cevoli (born 29 December 1968) is an Italian football manager and former player who is the current head coach of the San Marino national team.

== Playing career ==
Cevoli started his senior playing career with Sammarinese side Victor San Marino, helping the club win the league. He mainly operated as a defender.

== Personal life ==
Cevoli is a native of Romagna, Italy. He is a naturalized San Marino citizen.

== Career statistics ==
=== Club ===
Appearances and goals by club, season and competition
Club	Season	League			Coppa Italia		Other		Total	
Club	Season	Division	Apps	Goals	Apps	Goals	Apps	Goals	Apps	Goals
Jesina	1990−91	Serie C2	31	1	—		1 (Note: Appearance in Play-off/out Lega Pro 2a Divisione)	0	32	1
Fano	1991−92	Serie C1	32	1	—		—		32	1
Carpi	1999−93	Serie C1	29	0	—		—		29	0
Reggina	1993–94	Serie A	0	0	0	0	—		0	0
Reggina	1994–95	Serie A	0	0	0	0	—		0	0
Reggina	1995–96	Serie B	35	1	3	0	—		38	1
Reggina	Total		35	1	3	0	0	0	38	1
Torino	1996–97	Serie B	34	1	2	0	—		36	1
Reggina	1997–98	Serie B	34	1	4	0	—		38	1
Reggina	1998–99	Serie B	17	1	0	0	—		17	1
Reggina	Total		51	2	4	0	0	0	55	2
Cesena	1999–2000	Serie B	37	1	5	1	2 (Note: Appearance in Serie B Promotion and relegation play-offs)	0	44	2
Cesena	2000–01	Serie C1	32	0	1	0	—		33	0
Cesena	Total									

== Managerial statistics ==
As of match played 15 November 2026

Team	From	To	Record				
Team	From	To	G	W	D	L	Win %
San Marino	15 December 2023	Present	30	2	3	25	6.67
Total			30	2	3	25	6.67
