= Filippo Berardi =

Sammarinese footballer (born 1997)

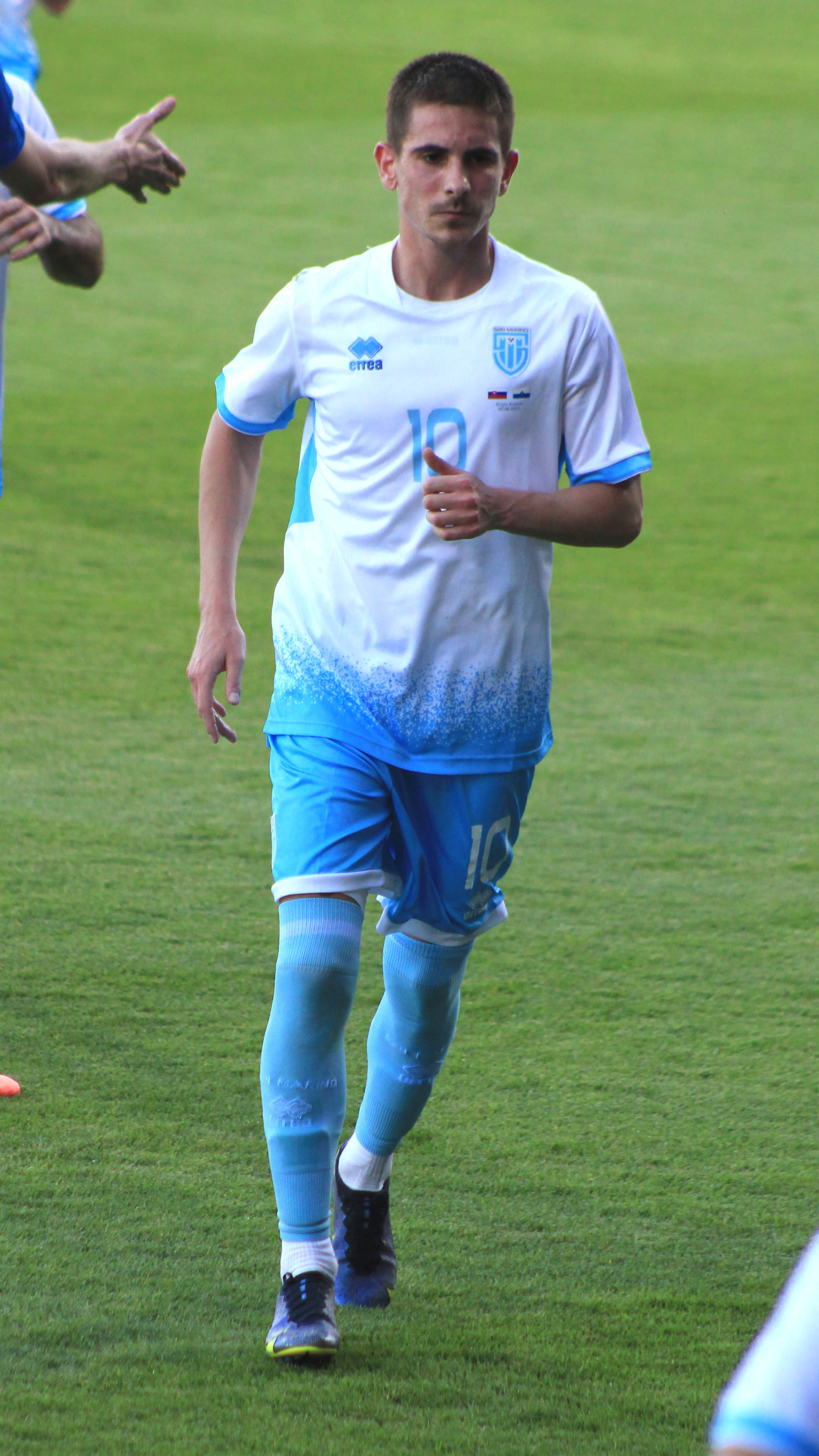
- Berardi with San Marino against Slovakia (2024)

Personal information
- Date of birth: 18 May 1997 (age 29)
- Place of birth: City of San Marino, San Marino
- Height: 1.76 m (5 ft 9 in)
- Position: Right winger

Team information
- Current team: La Fiorita
- Number: 99

Youth career
- –2015: Rimini
- 2015–2017: Torino

Senior career*
Years	Team	Apps	(Gls)
2013–2015	Rimini	24	(1)
2017–2018	Juve Stabia	20	(0)
2018–2019	Monopoli	15	(1)
2019–2021	Vibonese	45	(5)
2021–2023	Ancona	32	(2)
2023	Sammaurese	14	(3)
2023–2024	S.S. Cosmos	28	(13)
2024–2025	Vibonese	18	(1)
2025–2026	Tre Penne	27	(14)
2026-	La Fiorita	2	(0)

International career^{‡}
2011	San Marino U17	3	(0)
2015	San Marino U21	1	(0)
2016–	San Marino	43	(3)
- * Club domestic league appearances and goals as of 5 June 2026 ‡ National team caps and goals as of 5 June 2026

Filippo Berardi (born 18 May 1997) is a Sammarinese professional footballer who plays as a right winger for Campionato Sammarinese club Tre Penne and the San Marino national team.

== Club career ==
He was a youth player at Rimini prior to joining the youth academy at Torino FC before returning to Rimini.

On 12 July 2018, Berardi joined Serie C club Monopoli on loan for the 2018–19 season.

On 14 August 2019, he signed a two-year contract with Vibonese.

On 4 July 2021, he moved to Ancona-Matelica. On 20 January 2023, Berardi's contract with Ancona was terminated by mutual consent.

He had returned to Vibonese by the 2024–25 season.

In July 2025, Berardi returned to Sammarinese football, joining Tre Penne.

== International career ==
Berardi represented San Marino in various youth football teams. Berardi made his first appearance for the San Marino national football team in a 2018 World Cup qualifying 1–0 loss to Azerbaijan. He scored his first international goal in a 3–1 loss to Kazakhstan during a qualifying match for Euro 2020.

On 20 November 2023, he became only the third player to ever score multiple goals for San Marino, registering his second goal in a 2–1 loss to Finland in the final match of Euro 2024 qualifying. He scored a third goal on 20 March 2024 in a 1–3 loss to Saint Kitts and Nevis. It was the first occasion San Marino had scored a goal in three consecutive matches and moved Berardi into the position of his nation's joint-second highest scorer. He expressed his joy by being quoted as saying "If someone had told me years ago that I would score a couple of goals on the international stage in a San Marino shirt I would have taken them for a fool, I would not have believed them."

== Career statistics ==
=== International ===
As of match played on 5 June 2026

Appearances and goals by national team and year
National team	Year	Apps	Goals
San Marino	2016	1	0
San Marino	2017	3	0
San Marino	2018	2	0
San Marino	2019	8	1
San Marino	2020	4	0
San Marino	2021	3	0
San Marino	2023	5	1
San Marino	2024	7	1
San Marino	2025	7	0
San Marino	2026	3	0
Total		43	3

Scores and results list San Marino's goal tally first, score column indicates score after each Berardi goal.

List of international goals scored by Filippo Berardi
No.	Date	Venue	Opponent	Score	Result	Competition	Ref.
1	16 November 2019	San Marino Stadium, Serravalle, San Marino	Kazakhstan	1–3	1–3	UEFA Euro 2020 qualifying	
2	20 November 2023	San Marino Stadium, Serravalle, San Marino	Finland	1–2	1–2	UEFA Euro 2024 qualifying	
3	20 March 2024	San Marino Stadium, Serravalle, San Marino	Saint Kitts and Nevis	1–0	1–3	Friendly	
