= Manuel Marani =

Sammarinese footballer (born 1984)

Personal information
- Full name: Manuel Marani
- Date of birth: 7 June 1984 (age 42)
- Place of birth: Serravalle, San Marino
- Height: 6 ft 0 in (1.83 m)
- Position: Striker

Senior career*
Years	Team	Apps	(Gls)
2003–2005	Tre Fiori	1	(0)
2005–2006	Murata		
2006–2007	AC Dozzese		
2007–2008	Murata		
2008–2009	Del Conca Morciano		
2009–2010	Russi	33	(5)
2010–2016	Murata	27	(1)
Total		61	(6)

International career
2005–2012	San Marino	32	(2)
- * Club domestic league appearances and goals as of 18 July 2020

Manuel Marani (born 7 June 1984) is a Sammarinese retired football player from San Marino, who last played for S.S. Murata and formerly for the San Marino national football team.

== Career ==
Notably, he scored a late equalizer for San Marino against the Republic of Ireland on 7 February 2007. The goal nearly earned San Marino what would have been their greatest result, namely their third score draw in a competitive match and their second against a high-ranking team (the first came against Turkey, second against Latvia). However, Stephen Ireland scored a winner for the visitors just seconds before the end of injury time. He became the second player (out of 6) to score more than one goal for San Marino.

=== International goals ===
#	Date	Venue	Opponent	Score	Result	Competition
1	7 February 2007	Stadio Olimpico, Serravalle, San Marino	Republic of Ireland	1–1	1–2	UEFA Euro 2008 qualifying
2	14 August 2012	Stadio Olimpico, Serravalle, San Marino	Malta	1–0	2–3	Friendly
