= 2024–25 UEFA Nations League D =

Tournament details
- Dates: 5 September – 19 November 2024
- Teams: 6
- Promoted: Moldova; San Marino

Tournament statistics
- Matches played: 12
- Goals scored: 19 (1.58 per match)
- Attendance: 29,539 (2,462 per match)
- Top scorer(s): (Gibraltar) Liam Walker (San Marino) Nicola Nanni (2 goals each)

The 2024–25 UEFA Nations League D was the fourth and lowest division of the 2024–25 edition of the UEFA Nations League, the fourth season of the international football competition involving the men's national teams of the 55 member associations of UEFA.

== Format ==
League D consisted of the six lowest-ranked UEFA members from 49–54 in the 2024–25 UEFA Nations League access list, split into two groups of three. Each team played four matches within their group, using the home-and-away round-robin on double matchdays in September, October, and November 2024. The winners of both groups were automatically promoted to the 2026–27 UEFA Nations League C. In addition, the second-placed team of both groups advanced to the promotion play-offs against the two best-ranked fourth-placed teams from League C, to play home-and-away over two legs in March 2026, with the League C teams hosting the second leg. The winner of the tie will participate in the 2026–27 UEFA Nations League C, while the losers will enter League D.

As Russia were banned from participation in the 2024–25 UEFA Nations League due to their country's invasion of Ukraine, the size of the competition was reduced from 55 to 54 teams. Therefore, as the lowest division, League D was reduced from seven to six teams for the 2024–25 season.

== Teams ==
=== Team changes ===
The following were the team changes in League D from the 2022–23 season:

Incoming
Relegated from
Nations League C
Gibraltar

Outgoing
Promoted to
Nations League C
- Estonia
- Latvia

=== Seeding ===
In the 2024–25 access list, UEFA ranked teams based on the 2022–23 Nations League overall ranking. The seeding pots for the league phase were confirmed on 2 December 2023, and were based on the access list ranking.

Pot 1
Team	Rank
Gibraltar (Note: The identity of the play-out loser was not known at the time of the draw.)	49
Moldova	50

Pot 2
Team	Rank
Malta	51
Andorra	52
San Marino	53
Liechtenstein	54

The draw for the league phase took place at the Maison de la Mutualité in Paris, France, on 8 February 2024, 18:00 CET. Each group contained one team from pot 1 and two teams from pot 2.

== Groups ==
The fixture list was confirmed by UEFA on 9 February 2024, the day following the draw.

Times are CET/CEST, (Note: CEST (UTC+2) for matchdays 1–4 (September and October 2024), CET (UTC+1) for matchdays 5–6 (November 2024).) as listed by UEFA (local times, if different, are in parentheses).

=== Group 1 ===
Pos	Team	Pld	W	D	L	GF	GA	GD	Pts	Promotion or qualification	(San Marino)	(Gibraltar)	(Liechtenstein)
1	San Marino (P)	4	2	1	1	5	3	+2	7	Promotion to League C	—	1–1	1–0
2	Gibraltar	4	1	3	0	4	3	+1	6	Qualification for promotion play-offs	1–0	—	2–2
3	Liechtenstein	4	0	2	2	3	6	−3	2		1–3	0–0	—

Source: UEFA
Rules for classification: Tiebreakers
(P) Promoted
5 September 2024
20:45

San Marino	1–0	Liechtenstein
Sensoli 53'	Report

San Marino Stadium, Serravalle
Attendance: 914
Referee: Andris Treimanis (Latvia)

8 September 2024
18:00

Gibraltar	2–2	Liechtenstein
Walker 8'; Scanlon 90+7'	Report	Saglam 53'; N. Hasler 90+14' (pen.)

Europa Sports Park, Europa Point
Attendance: 681
Referee: Kristo Tohver (Estonia)

10 October 2024
20:45

Gibraltar	1–0	San Marino
Britto 62'	Report

Europa Sports Park, Europa Point
Attendance: 677
Referee: Felix Zwayer (Germany)

13 October 2024
18:00

Liechtenstein	0–0	Gibraltar
	Report

Rheinpark Stadion, Vaduz
Attendance: 1,510
Referee: Horațiu Feșnic (Romania)

15 November 2024
20:45

San Marino	1–1	Gibraltar
Nanni 90+2' (pen.)	Report	Walker 11' (pen.)

San Marino Stadium, Serravalle
Attendance: 1,324
Referee: Igor Pajac (Croatia)

18 November 2024
20:45

Liechtenstein	1–3	San Marino
Sele 40'	Report	Lazzari 46'; Nanni 66' (pen.); A. Golinucci 76'

Rheinpark Stadion, Vaduz
Attendance: 1,157
Referee: Jérémie Pignard (France)

=== Group 2 ===
Pos	Team	Pld	W	D	L	GF	GA	GD	Pts	Promotion or qualification	(Moldova)	(Malta)	(Andorra)
1	Moldova (P)	4	3	0	1	5	1	+4	9	Promotion to League C	—	2–0	2–0
2	Malta	4	2	1	1	2	2	0	7	Qualification for promotion play-offs	1–0	—	0–0
3	Andorra	4	0	1	3	0	4	−4	1		0–1	0–1	—

Source: UEFA
Rules for classification: Tiebreakers
(P) Promoted
7 September 2024
18:00 (19:00 UTC+3)

Moldova	2–0	Malta
Caimacov 32'; Nicolaescu 45+4' (pen.)	Report

Stadionul Zimbru, Chișinău
Attendance: 6,142
Referee: Mykola Balakin (Ukraine)

10 September 2024
20:45

Andorra	0–1	Malta
	Report	Camenzuli 45'

Estadi Nacional, Andorra la Vella
Attendance: 812
Referee: Mohammed Al-Hakim (Sweden)

10 October 2024
18:00 (19:00 UTC+3)

Moldova	2–0	Andorra
Ioniță 31'; Cojocaru 90+5'	Report

Stadionul Zimbru, Chișinău
Attendance: 6,442
Referee: Miloš Milanović (Serbia)

13 October 2024
18:00

Malta	1–0	Moldova
Teuma 87' (pen.)	Report

National Stadium, Ta' Qali
Attendance: 5,754
Referee: John Brooks (England)

16 November 2024
18:00

Andorra	0–1	Moldova
	Report	Postolachi 90+2'

Estadi Nacional, Andorra la Vella
Attendance: 984
Referee: Bulat Sariyev (Kazakhstan)

19 November 2024
20:45

Malta	0–0	Andorra
	Report

National Stadium, Ta' Qali
Attendance: 3,142
Referee: Luka Bilbija (Bosnia and Herzegovina)

== Goalscorers ==
There were 19 goals scored in 12 matches, for an average of 1.58 goals per match.

2 goals

- (Gibraltar national football team) Liam Walker
- (San Marino national football team) Nicola Nanni

1 goal

- (Gibraltar national football team) Ethan Britto
- (Gibraltar national football team) James Scanlon
- (Liechtenstein national football team) Nicolas Hasler
- (Liechtenstein national football team) Ferhat Saglam
- (Liechtenstein national football team) Aron Sele
- (Malta national football team) Ryan Camenzuli
- (Malta national football team) Teddy Teuma
- (Moldova national football team) Mihail Caimacov
- (Moldova national football team) Maxim Cojocaru
- (Moldova national football team) Artur Ioniță
- (Moldova national football team) Ion Nicolaescu
- (Moldova national football team) Virgiliu Postolachi
- (San Marino national football team) Alessandro Golinucci
- (San Marino national football team) Lorenzo Lazzari
- (San Marino national football team) Nicko Sensoli

== Overall ranking ==
Following the league phase, the six League D teams were ordered 49th to 54th in an interim overall ranking for the 2024–25 UEFA Nations League according to the following rules:

- The teams finishing first in the groups were ranked 49th to 50th according to the results of the league phase.
- The teams finishing second in the groups were ranked 51st to 52nd according to the results of the league phase.
- The teams finishing third in the groups were ranked 53rd to 54th according to the results of the league phase.

Rnk	Grp	Team	Pld	W	D	L	GF	GA	GD	Pts
49	D2	Moldova	4	3	0	1	5	1	+4	9
50	D1	San Marino	4	2	1	1	5	3	+2	7
51	D2	Malta	4	2	1	1	2	2	0	7
52	D1	Gibraltar	4	1	3	0	4	3	+1	6
53	D1	Liechtenstein	4	0	2	2	3	6	−3	2
54	D2	Andorra	4	0	1	3	0	4	−4	1

Source: UEFA
Rules for classification: Ranking criteria

A final overall ranking was also compiled, though this was only used to rank teams within their new leagues for the following edition of the competition.
