= San Marino national football team =

Men's association football team

San Marino
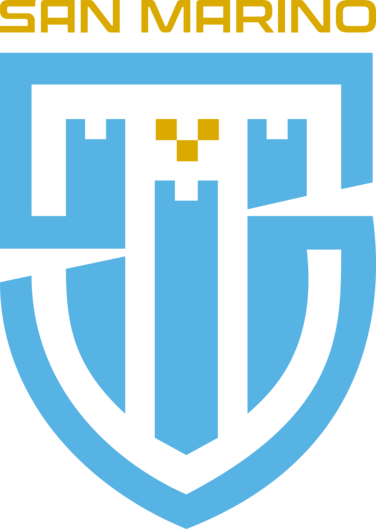
- Nickname: La Serenissima (The Most Serene)
- Association: Federazione Sammarinese Giuoco Calcio (FSGC)
- Confederation: UEFA (Europe)
- Head coach: Roberto Cevoli
- Captain: Matteo Vitaioli
- Most caps: Matteo Vitaioli (100)
- Top scorer: Andy Selva (8)
- Home stadium: San Marino Stadium
- FIFA code: SMR
First colours	Second colours

FIFA ranking
- Current: 211 (18 November 2026)
- Highest: 118 (September 1993)
- Lowest: 211 (November 2018 – July 2019, March 2022 – July 2023, April 2026 – pres.)

First international
- Unofficial: San Marino 0–0 Lebanon (Aleppo, Syria; 16 September 1987); Official: San Marino 0–4 Switzerland (Serravalle, San Marino; 14 November 1990)

Biggest win
- Liechtenstein 1–3 San Marino (Vaduz, Liechtenstein; 18 November 2024)

Biggest defeat
- San Marino 0–13 Germany (Serravalle, San Marino; 6 September 2006)

Mediterranean Games
- Appearances: 4 (first in 1997)
- Best result: Seventh place (2022)

The San Marino national football team represents San Marino in men's international association football competitions. The team is governed by the San Marino Football Federation and represents the smallest population of any UEFA member. They are currently the lowest-ranked FIFA-affiliated national football team, having won only three matches since their inception.

San Marino's first official match was a 4–0 defeat to Switzerland in a European Championship qualifier in 1990. An unofficial San Marino team played against the Canada U-23 side in 1986, losing 1–0. Since their competitive debut, San Marino has participated in the qualifiers for every European Championship and FIFA World Cup, though it has never qualified for either competition. San Marino's three competitive victories have all come against Liechtenstein, with one in a 2004 friendly and two in the 2024–25 UEFA Nations League.

== History ==
Though the San Marino Football Federation was formed in 1931, the Federation did not establish a national team until 1986, when a team representing the Federation played against the Canada U-23 team in an unofficial international, which ended in a 1–0 defeat. San Marino gained affiliation to FIFA and UEFA in 1988, allowing the team to participate in major championships. Before this, Sammarinese players had been considered Italian in international football contexts.

San Marino's first match in a FIFA-sanctioned competition was against Switzerland on 14 November 1990 in a qualifier for the 1992 European Championships. San Marino lost 4–0 and would lose all eight of their other qualifiers. The team struggled in away matches, losing all by at least four goals. San Marino scored only one goal, which was a penalty in a 3–1 defeat at home by Romania, and conceded 33 goals in total.

For their first World Cup qualifying campaign, San Marino was drawn in a group with England, the Netherlands, Norway, Poland and Turkey. The opening match resulted in a 10–0 defeat to Norway. The return match was less one-sided, finishing 2–0 to the Norwegians. A 4–1 defeat in Turkey saw San Marino score their first goal in a World Cup qualifier (also their first from open play), and a goalless draw against the same opposition on 10 March 1993 gave them their first-ever point. In their final qualifier against England, Davide Gualtieri scored the then-fastest goal in World Cup qualifying history after 8.3 seconds. However, San Marino went on to lose 7–1. San Marino finished the campaign with one point and conceded 46 goals in 10 matches.

The team's qualification campaign for UEFA Euro 1996 followed a similar pattern to the previous European championships as they lost every match. A match away to Finland gave San Marino their first goal away from home in the European Championship qualifiers. However, the team lost 4–1. Their only other goal came in a 3–1 home defeat by the Faroe Islands; the two wins over San Marino were the only points gained by the Faroe Islands in the group. In the first match, a 3–0 score in Toftir is the Faroe Islands' record competitive win.

Even by San Marinese standards, the qualification campaign for the 1998 FIFA World Cup was disappointing. Losing every match by three goals or more, San Marino failed to score a single goal. This is the only World Cup qualifying tournament in which they have failed to score. Qualification for Euro 2000 again resulted in defeats in every match. The closest San Marino got to gaining a point was against Cyprus, a 1–0 defeat on 18 November 1998.

In April 2001, San Marino gained their first-ever away point, drawing 1–1 with Latvia in Riga. The team ended the 2002 FIFA World Cup qualifying group with a new best of three goals, though one of these came in a 10–1 defeat by Belgium. In the UEFA Euro 2004 qualifying, San Marino lost all eight matches, failing to score. The closest result was a 1–0 home defeat by Latvia, with the winner scored in the last minute. Latvia went on to qualify for the final tournament. A 2–2 draw against Liechtenstein in a friendly in August 2003 saw the team set a new national record for most goals scored in a match; only twice since, in a 2–3 loss to Malta in another friendly nine years later, and again in their most recent victory, 3-1 over Liechtenstein in November 2024's final match of their UEFA Nations League run, have the team scored multiple goals in a game.

In April 2004, San Marino gained their first win after more than 70 attempts, a 1–0 victory over Liechtenstein in a friendly on 28 April 2004 courtesy of a fifth-minute goal by Andy Selva. The match was Martin Andermatt's debut as Liechtenstein manager. Results during qualification for the 2006 World Cup followed a similar vein to previous qualifying groups. Matches were generally one-sided defeats, except for single-goal defeats at home by Lithuania and Belgium.

San Marino's opening UEFA Euro 2008 qualifying match resulted in a record 13–0 defeat at home by Germany on 6 September 2006. They scored only twice and conceded fifty-seven goals in losing all twelve matches. However, the home matches against Ireland, Cyprus and Wales were each lost by a single goal.

In the qualification campaign for the 2010 FIFA World Cup, they lost all ten matches and failed to qualify. They conceded 47 goals in those fixtures, including 10 in a defeat by Poland, which became Poland's highest scoring victory of all time, and scored just once, in a 3–1 defeat by Slovakia. The UEFA Euro 2012 qualifiers started in a similar way, the first nine matches all being defeats with an aggregate of 49 goals conceded and none scored, their best result being a one-goal loss to Finland at home, with the worst being a heavy 11–0 loss to the Netherlands, which became the Netherlands' highest scoring victory of all time and San Marino's worst-ever away defeat. This was then followed up by two lighter defeats, a 5–0 home loss against Sweden, before completing the campaign with a 4–0 away loss to Moldova.

On 10 September 2013, Alessandro Della Valle scored San Marino's first competitive goal in five years. With the score 1–0 to Poland in the Stadio Olimpico, Della Valle headed in a free-kick in the 22nd minute, beating goalkeeper Artur Boruc at his front post. Poland then regained the lead a minute later and eventually won 5–1. It was the first international goal of any kind scored by San Marino since the national team lost 3–2 at home to Malta in 2012.

On 15 November 2014, San Marino drew 0–0 at home against Estonia. It was the first time in ten years that the team had not lost a match, ending a 61–match losing streak, and securing the country's first-ever point in a European Championship qualifier.

In October 2016, Mattia Stefanelli scored for San Marino in their 4–1 loss to Norway.

On 16 November 2019, Filippo Berardi scored a goal in a 3–1 loss to Kazakhstan in a UEFA Euro 2020 qualifying match—the first goal for San Marino in two years (5–1 vs. Azerbaijan on 4 September 2017) and their first home goal in six years (5–1 vs. Poland on 10 September 2013).

On 13 October 2020, San Marino recorded their fourth competitive draw and their first since 2014, after their UEFA Nations League match with Liechtenstein ended 0–0. A month later they made history by holding Gibraltar to a goalless draw, surviving with ten men after Davide Simoncini was sent off. This heralded several firsts for them: the first major tournament in which they had gained more than one point, the first time they had gained more than one point in a calendar year, and the first time that they had gone unbeaten without conceding a single goal in two consecutive competitive matches.

On 7 December 2020, San Marino was drawn into Group I for the 2022 FIFA World Cup qualifiers. The team failed to get a single point and lost all their matches, including a 0–10 home defeat against England, and with a record of one goal scored, at home against Poland in a 1–7 loss, against 46 conceded.

On 28 March 2022, San Marino played the first official match in its history against a non-European team in a friendly game against Cape Verde played on a neutral venue in Spain, the result being a 2–0 loss. San Marino then took on a second African side with a much lower standard than the previous one, the 198th ranked Seychelles, whom they hosted in a friendly at Stadio Olimpico on 21 September 2022. San Marino ended an 18-game losing streak with a goalless draw but disappointed overall, failing to capitalize on their chances and win at home against an opponent within its reach, who played defensively in a 4–5–1 formation. The 2022–2023 edition of the UEFA Nations League saw the selection again in Group B of League D composed of three teams, but they lost their four games without scoring a goal.

On 17 October 2023, San Marino scored their first competitive goal in two years against Denmark in a 1–2 loss during UEFA Euro 2024 qualifying. They would score again against Kazakhstan on 17 November 2023, losing 3–1, and just three days later they scored again in a 2–1 loss to Finland. This marked the first time San Marino scored in three consecutive games.

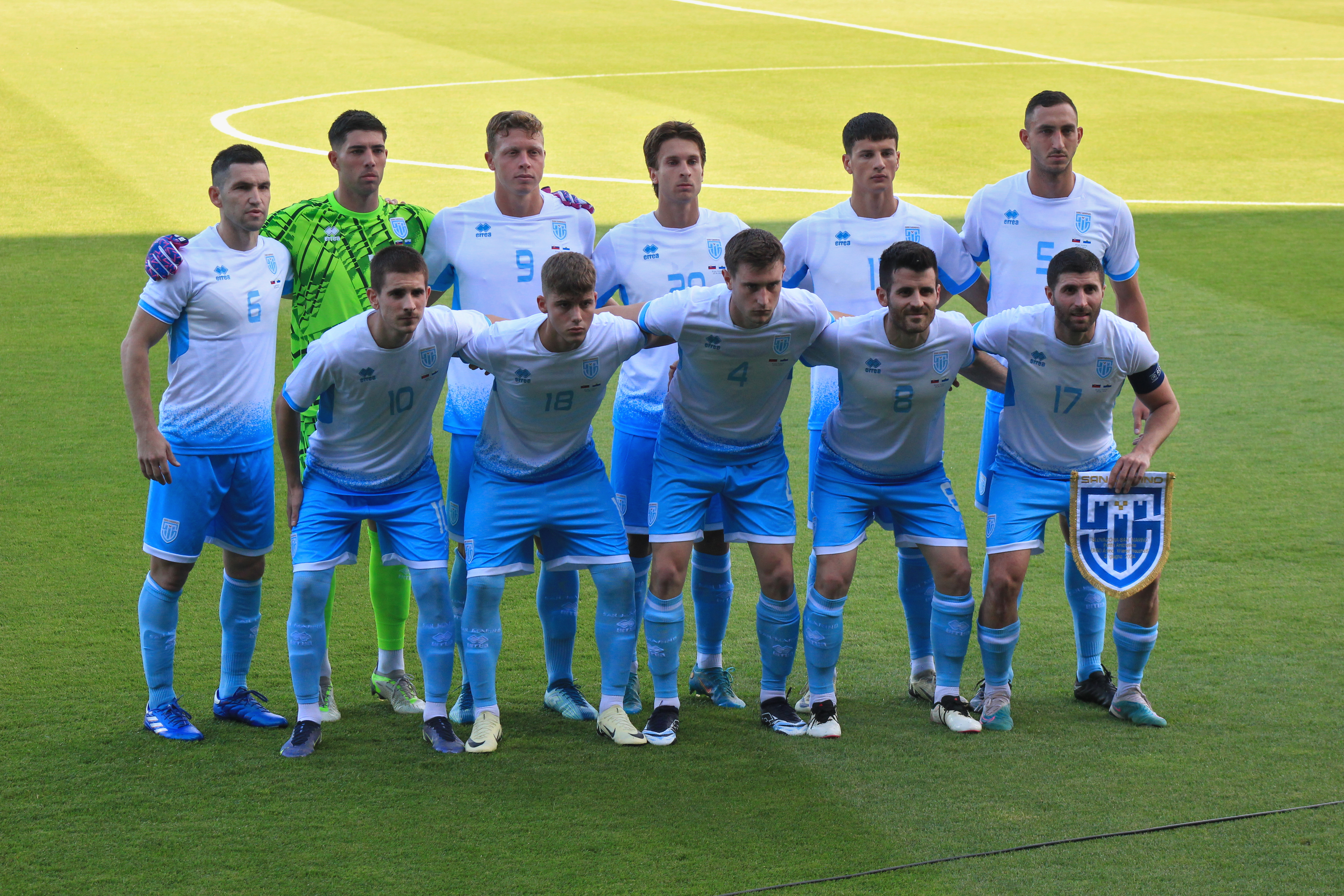
Team picture of the San Marino national football team before their match against Slovakia (2024)

On 20 March 2024, San Marino scored in four straight games for the first time in their history after taking a 1–0 lead against Saint Kitts and Nevis, eventually losing 3–1. On 24 March 2024, San Marino ended a 12-game losing run with a 0–0 draw against Saint Kitts.

=== 2024–25 UEFA Nations League ===
San Marino played Liechtenstein at home in the first round of the 2024–25 UEFA Nations League on 5 September. After a disallowed goal for Liechtenstein in the 30th minute, Nicko Sensoli stole the ball from the Liechtenstein defence and scored to make it 1–0 in the 53rd minute. The Sammarinese then held on to claim a 1–0 victory, their first competitive win since joining FIFA and UEFA. A later loss away to Gibraltar and a 1–1 draw salvaged in stoppage time by a Nicola Nanni penalty against the same side left San Marino second in the table, with the ability to advance directly to League C should they beat Liechtenstein away (by virtue of their opponents's two draws).

On 18 November 2024, San Marino played Liechtenstein in Vaduz. Liechtenstein took the lead through an Aron Sele 40th minute goal. After the break, San Marino equalized with a right-wing attack culminating in Lorenzo Lazzari getting past the defence and beating the goalkeeper. In the 66th minute, Nanni converted a penalty kick for a 2–1 lead. 10 minutes later, Alessandro Tosi found himself on the left side of the Liechtenstein goal and passed to substitute Alessandro Golinucci, who hit a first-time strike into the net to make it 3–1. With the victory, San Marino was promoted to League C. It was the first time San Marino had scored more than one goal in a competitive fixture, the first time that San Marino had scored more than two goals in any fixture, the first time that San Marino had won a match from a losing position, the first time San Marino won an away match, and the first time San Marino was promoted in a major international competition. As a Nations League group winner, San Marino also became eligible for one of four reserved places in the second round of 2026 FIFA World Cup qualification for the highest-ranked group winners that did not finish in the top-two of their qualifying group. However, it ultimately missed out as the lowest-ranked of six eligible teams.

== Image ==
=== Kits ===
Period	Supplier
1990–1994	(England) Admiral
1994–2010	(Italy) Virma
2011–2017	(Germany) Adidas
2018–2022	(Italy) Macron
2022–2026	(Italy) Erreà
2026–present	(Germany) Adidas

=== Stadium ===
San Marino play home matches at the San Marino Stadium, a municipally owned stadium in Serravalle, which also hosts the matches of club side San Marino Calcio. It has a capacity of 7,000. Crowds are low but there is always a fan group called "Brigata Mai 1 Gioia", mainly composed of Italians from Emilia-Romagna. On occasion, traveling supporters outnumber the Sammarinese support. For example, in the fixture against the Republic of Ireland in February 2007, 2,500 of the 3,294 crowd were Irish supporters.

San Marino has played four "home" matches outside their borders. For World Cup qualifiers against England and the Netherlands in 1993, the Stadio Renato Dall'Ara in Bologna was used, and a UEFA Nations League match against Liechtenstein in 2020 took place at the Stadio Romeo Neri in Rimini. A fourth match took place in UEFA Euro 2024 qualifying against Kazakhstan in June 2023, being played at Stadio Ennio Tardini as a new pitch was being laid at San Marino's usual stadium.

=== Reputation ===
San Marino has the smallest population of any UEFA country. A 1–0 friendly win against Liechtenstein in 2004 and two UEFA Nations League wins in 2024, again over Liechtenstein, are their only victories to date.

The national side is mainly composed of amateur players. Only a small number of players are at least semi-professionals, as many hold second jobs outside of the sport. Their 13–0 defeat at home against Germany was a European Championship record until France eclipsed this in 2023 with a 14–0 victory over Gibraltar. They have conceded ten goals on seven other separate occasions.

In the FIFA World Rankings, San Marino traditionally has the lowest rank of any UEFA country. Since the creation of FIFA rankings in 1992, San Marino's average position has been 176th.

San Marino held the record for the fastest goal in FIFA World Cup qualifying history for 22 years when they stunned England with a goal after only 8.3 seconds in 1993. England went on to win the match 7–1.

In 2001, Latvia manager Gary Johnson resigned after failing to beat San Marino in a World Cup qualifier. The Republic of Ireland's 2–1 win over San Marino in February 2007 (from a last-second goal) resulted in scathing press criticism for the Irish team.

San Marino set a European record when they went over 20 matches without scoring between October 2008 and August 2012. On 8 September 2015, San Marino scored its first away goal in 14 years when Matteo Vitaioli scored against Lithuania in Euro 2016 qualification.

An interesting result of San Marino's weaknesses is that many people see them as football's biggest underdogs; as a result, they have gained a substantial following online from across the world, including a Twitter account dedicated to covering their games. For further exposure, the San Marino Football Federation agreed to be part of the FIFA+ platform in 2026.

== Results and fixtures ==
The following is a list of match results in the last 12 months, as well as any future matches that have been scheduled.

Win Draw Loss Fixture

=== 2026 ===
28 March Friendly	San Marino	1–2	Faroe Islands	Serravalle, San Marino
15:00 UTC+1	Giacopetti 22'	Report	Andreasen 45+1'; Frederiksberg 65'	Stadium: San Marino Stadium; Attendance: 320; Referee: Kyriakos Athanasiou (Cyprus)

31 March Friendly	San Marino	0–0	Andorra	Serravalle, San Marino
18:00 UTC+2		Report		Stadium: San Marino Stadium; Attendance: 361; Referee: Kyriakos Athanasiou (Cyprus)

5 June Friendly	San Marino	1–2	Bangladesh	Serravalle, San Marino
19:00 UTC+2	Giacopetti 31'	Report	Barman 19', 86'	Stadium: San Marino Stadium; Attendance: 2,934; Referee: Walter Altmann (Austria)

9 June Friendly	San Marino	1–2	Azerbaijan	Szombathely, Hungary
20:00 UTC+2	Nanni 9'	Report	Dashdamirov 27'; Dadaşov 49'	Stadium: Haladás Sportkomplexum; Attendance: 100; Referee: Márton Rúsz (Hungary)

26 September 2026–27 UEFA Nations League	San Marino	0–7	Finland	Serravalle, San Marino
18:00 UTC+2		Report	Pohjanpalo 5', 79', 88' (pen.); Svanbäck 14'; Källman 33'; Walta 50', 55'	Stadium: San Marino Stadium; Attendance: 1,148; Referee: Nathan Verboomen (Belgium)

29 September 2026–27 UEFA Nations League	San Marino	0–3	Albania	Serravalle, San Marino
20:45 UTC+2		Report	Mehmeti 21'; Uzuni 27'; Manaj 65'	Stadium: San Marino Stadium; Attendance: 3,402; Referee: Mihály Káprály (Hungary)

3 October 2026–27 UEFA Nations League	Belarus	4–0	San Marino	Budapest, Hungary (Note: Due to Belarusian involvement in the Russian invasion of Ukraine, Belarus are required to play their home matches at neutral venues, and behind closed doors, until further notice.)
19:00 UTC+3	Kontsevoy 46', 88'; Shumansky 65'; Ebong 68'	Report		Stadium: Illovszky Rudolf Stadion; Attendance: 0 Referee: Alexandros Tsakalidis (Greece)

6 October 2026–27 UEFA Nations League	Albania	2–1	San Marino	Tirana, Albania
20:45 UTC+2	Asllani 11', 90+3' (pen.)	Report	Lazzari 66'	Stadium: Arena Kombëtare; Attendance: 16,240; Referee: Mehmet Türkmen (Turkey)

12 November 2026–27 UEFA Nations League	San Marino	0–2	Belarus	Serravalle, San Marino
20:45 UTC+1		Report	Gomanov 13'; Kontesvoy 17'	Stadium: San Marino Stadium; Attendance: 365; Referee: Goga Kikacheishvili (Georgia)

15 November 2026–27 UEFA Nations League	Finland	7–2	San Marino	Helsinki, Finland
19:00 UTC+2	Svanbäck 8', 20', 78'; Walta 17'; Pohjanpalo 36', 47'; Håkans 70'	Report	Nanni 26' (pen.), 76'	Stadium: Töölö Football Stadium; Attendance: 7,153; Referee: Georgi Kabakov (Bulgaria)

== Coaching staff ==
Current technical staff:

Head coach	Roberto Cevoli
Technical assistant	Leandro Vessella
Goalkeeping coach	Carlo Magnani

=== Manager history ===
As of 15 November 2026

Manager	Nat.	Start	End	Matches	Won	Draw	Lost	Win %
Giulio Casali	(San Marino)	28 March 1986	20 September 1987	6	0	2	4	0%
Giorgio Leoni	(San Marino)	14 November 1990	15 November 1995	29	0	1	28	0%
Massimo Bonini	(San Marino)	2 June 1996	10 September 1997	8	0	0	8	0%
Giampaolo Mazza	(San Marino)	10 October 1998	15 October 2013	85	1	2	82	~1.18%
Pierangelo Manzaroli	(San Marino)	8 June 2014	8 October 2017	28	0	1	27	0%
Franco Varrella	(Italy)	8 September 2018	28 November 2021	34	0	2	32	0%
Fabrizio Costantini	(San Marino)	28 November 2021	12 December 2023	20	0	2	18	0%
Roberto Cevoli	(Italy)	15 December 2023	Present	30	2	3	25	~8.33%

== Players ==
=== Current squad ===
The following players have been called up for the 2026–27 UEFA Nations League matches against Belarus on 12 November and Finland on 15 November 2026.

Caps and goals correct as of 15 November 2026 after the match against Finland.

No.	Pos.	Player	Date of birth (age)	Caps	Goals	Club
	GK	Edoardo Colombo	24 January 2001 (age 25)	29	0	(Malta Football Association) Gzira United
	GK	Pietro Amici	27 January 2004 (age 22)	1	0	(San Marino Football Federation) San Marino Academy
	GK	Mirco De Angelis	3 March 2000 (age 26)	0	0	(San Marino Football Federation) Folgore
	DF	Filippo Fabbri	7 January 2002 (age 24)	45	1	(Italian Football Federation) Mezzolara
	DF	Dante Rossi	12 July 1987 (age 39)	42	0	(Italian Football Federation) Tropical Coriano
	DF	Alessandro Tosi	8 April 2001 (age 25)	36	0	(Italian Football Federation) Tropical Coriano
	DF	Giacomo Benvenuti	3 February 2006 (age 20)	21	0	(Italian Football Federation) Santegidiese
	DF	Marco Pasolini	26 April 2003 (age 23)	14	0	(Italian Football Federation) Tropical Coriano
	DF	Tommaso Benvenuti	3 February 2006 (age 20)	10	0	(Italian Football Federation) Lucchese
	DF	Bartolomeo Riggioni	3 July 2004 (age 22)	1	0	(Italian Football Federation) Lupa Frascati
	DF	Pietro Marinucci	21 October 2007 (age 19)	1	0	(Italian Football Federation) Pietracuta
	DF	Giulio Maria Bugli	2 February 2007 (age 19)	1	0	(Italian Football Federation) Tropical Coriano
	MF	Alessandro Golinucci	10 October 1994 (age 32)	71	2	(San Marino Football Federation) Virtus
	MF	Marcello Mularoni	8 September 1998 (age 28)	58	0	(San Marino Football Federation) La Fiorita
	MF	Lorenzo Capicchioni	19 January 2002 (age 24)	32	0	(Italian Football Federation) Tropical Coriano
	MF	Lorenzo Lazzari	6 June 2003 (age 23)	30	3	(Italian Football Federation) Tropical Coriano
	MF	Samuele Zannoni	29 April 2002 (age 24)	24	1	(Italian Football Federation) Rimini
	MF	Andrea Contadini	18 August 2002 (age 24)	20	0	(Italian Football Federation) Tropical Coriano
	MF	Simone Giocondi	28 April 2002 (age 24)	13	1	(Italian Football Federation) Grifone Gialloverde
	MF	Cristian Meloni	12 March 2008 (age 18)	7	0	(Italian Football Federation) Young Santarcangelo
	MF	Enea Della Balda	7 August 2007 (age 19)	5	0	(Italian Football Federation) Tropical Coriano
	FW	Nicola Nanni	2 May 2000 (age 26)	60	7	(Italian Football Federation) Arzignano Valchiampo
	FW	Nicolas Giacopetti	5 June 2006 (age 20)	21	3	(Italian Football Federation) Calvi Noale
	FW	Samuel Pancotti	31 October 2000 (age 26)	17	0	(San Marino Football Federation) Folgore
	FW	Gabriel Capicchioni	12 May 2006 (age 20)	11	0	(United States Soccer Federation) FIU Panthers
	FW	Fausto Salicioni	20 January 2006 (age 20)	7	0	(Italian Football Federation) Tropical Coriano

=== Recent call-ups ===
The following players have been called up within the last 12 months and are still eligible to represent.

Pos.	Player	Date of birth (age)	Caps	Goals	Club	Latest call-up
GK	Lyes Hoël	12 April 2007 (age 19)	0	0	(France) Thionville	v. Albania, 6 October 2026
GK	Matteo Zavoli	6 July 1996 (age 30)	1	0	(San Marino) La Fiorita	v. Albania, 29 September 2026
DF	Michele Cevoli	22 July 1998 (age 28)	44	0	(Italy) Tropical Coriano	v. Albania, 6 October 2026
DF	Alberto Riccardi	1 October 2006 (age 20)	10	0	(Italy) Tropical Coriano	v. Albania, 6 October 2026
DF	Mattia Sancisi	13 April 2003 (age 23)	1	0	(San Marino) Tre Fiori	v. Azerbaijan, 9 June 2026
DF	Filippo Terni	1 March 2009 (age 17)	0	0	(Italy) Cesena U17	v. Azerbaijan, 9 June 2026
MF	Matteo Valli Casadei	1 June 2005 (age 21)	20	0	(San Marino) Cailungo	v. Azerbaijan, 9 June 2026
FW	Nicholas Protti	24 July 2007 (age 19)	0	0	(Italy) Misano	v. Albania, 6 October 2026
FW	Simone Tamagnini	17 January 2008 (age 18)	0	0	(Italy) Tropical Coriano	v. Azerbaijan, 9 June 2026
FW	Filippo Berardi	18 May 1997 (age 29)	43	3	(San Marino) La Fiorita	v. Bangladesh, 6 June 2026 ^{INJ}
^{INJ} Withdrew due to injury^{PRE} Preliminary squad / standby^{RET} Retired from the national team^{SUS} Serving suspension^{WD} Player withdrew from the squad due to a non-injury issue.

== Records ==
As of 15 November 2026
Players in bold are still active with San Marino.

=== Most capped players ===
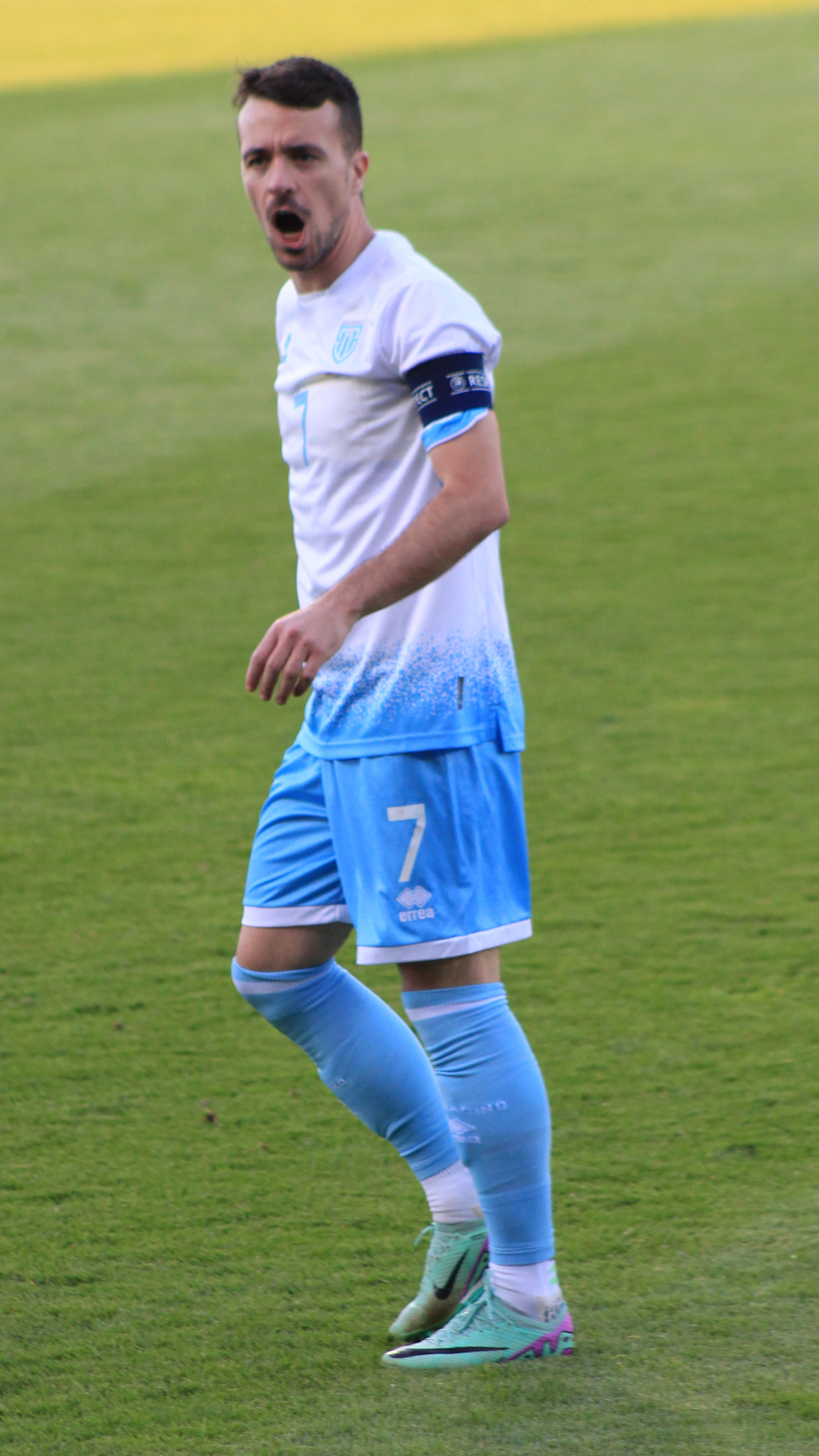
Matteo Vitaioli is San Marino's most capped player with 100 caps.

Rank	Player	Caps	Goals	Years
1	**Matteo Vitaioli**	100	1	2007–present
2	**Mirko Palazzi**	75	1	2005–present
3	Andy Selva	73	8	1998–2016
4	**Alessandro Golinucci**	71	2	2015–present
5	Davide Simoncini	69	0	2006–2021
5	Damiano Vannucci	69	0	1996–2012
7	Alessandro Della Valle	65	1	2002–2017
7	Aldo Junior Simoncini	65	0	2006–2023
9	**Nicola Nanni**	60	7	2018–present
9	Simone Bacciocchi	60	0	1998–2013
9	Adolfo Hirsch	60	0	2011–2023

=== Top goalscorers ===
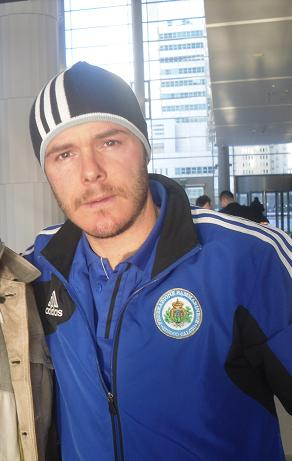
Andy Selva is San Marino's all-time top scorer with 8 goals.

Rank	Player	Goals	Caps	Ratio	Years
1	Andy Selva	8	73	0.11	1998–2016
2	**Nicola Nanni**	7	60	0.08	2018–present
3	**Nicolas Giacopetti**	3	21	0.14	2024–present
3	**Lorenzo Lazzari**	3	30	0.1	2022–present
3	**Filippo Berardi**	3	43	0.07	2016–present
6	Manuel Marani	2	32	0.06	2003–2012
6	**Alessandro Golinucci**	2	71	0.03	2015–present

== Competitive record ==
=== FIFA World Cup ===
FIFA World Cup record									Qualification record					
Year	Round	Position	Pld	W	D	L	GF	GA	Pld	W	D	L	GF	GA
(Uruguay) 1930 to (Mexico) 1986	Not a FIFA member								Not a FIFA member					
(Italy) 1990	Did not enter								Did not enter					
(United States) 1994	Did not qualify								10	0	1	9	2	46
(France) 1998	Did not qualify								8	0	0	8	0	42
(South Korea) (Japan) 2002	Did not qualify								8	0	1	7	3	30
(Germany) 2006	Did not qualify								10	0	0	10	2	40
(South Africa) 2010	Did not qualify								10	0	0	10	1	47
(Brazil) 2014	Did not qualify								10	0	0	10	1	54
(Russia) 2018	Did not qualify								10	0	0	10	2	51
(Qatar) 2022	Did not qualify								10	0	0	10	1	46
(Canada) (Mexico) (United States) 2026	Did not qualify								8	0	0	8	2	39
(Spain) (Portugal) (Morocco) 2030	To be determined								To be determined					
(Saudi Arabia) 2034	To be determined								To be determined					
Total	—	0/9	–	–	–	–	–	–	84	0	2	82	14	395

=== UEFA European Championship ===
UEFA European Championship record									Qualification record					
Year	Round	Position	Pld	W	D*	L	GF	GA	Pld	W	D	L	GF	GA
(France) 1960	Declined participation								Declined participation					
(Spain) 1964	Declined participation								Declined participation					
(Italy) 1968	Declined participation								Declined participation					
(Belgium) 1972	Declined participation								Declined participation					
(Socialist Federal Republic of Yugoslavia) 1976	Declined participation								Declined participation					
(Italy) 1980	Declined participation								Declined participation					
(France) 1984	Declined participation								Declined participation					
(West Germany) 1988	Declined participation								Declined participation					
(Sweden) 1992	Did not qualify								8	0	0	8	1	33
(England) 1996	Did not qualify								10	0	0	10	2	36
(Belgium) (Netherlands) 2000	Did not qualify								8	0	0	8	1	44
(Portugal) 2004	Did not qualify								8	0	0	8	0	30
(Austria) (Switzerland) 2008	Did not qualify								12	0	0	12	2	57
(Poland) (Ukraine) 2012	Did not qualify								10	0	0	10	0	53
(France) 2016	Did not qualify								10	0	1	9	1	36
(Europe) 2020	Did not qualify								10	0	0	10	1	51
(Germany) 2024	Did not qualify								10	0	0	10	3	31
(England) (Scotland) (Republic of Ireland) (Wales) 2028	To be determined								To be determined					
(Italy) (Turkey) 2032	To be determined								To be determined					
Total	0/17	—	–	–	–	–	–	–	86	0	1	85	11	371

=== UEFA Nations League ===
UEFA Nations League record
League phase												Finals								
Season	LG	Grp	Pos.	Pld	W	D	L	GF	GA	P/R	RK	Year	Pos.	Pld	W	D	L	GF	GA	Squad
2018–19	D	2	4th	6	0	0	6	0	16	Same position	55th	(Portugal) 2019	Did not qualify							
2020–21	D	2	3rd	4	0	2	2	0	3	Same position	54th	(Italy) 2021	Did not qualify							
2022–23	D	2	3rd	4	0	0	4	0	9	Same position	54th	(Netherlands) 2023	Did not qualify							
2024–25	D	1	1st	4	2	1	1	5	3	▲	50th	(Germany) 2025	Did not qualify							
2026–27	C	1	4th	6	0	0	6	3	25	Same position	48th	2027	Did not qualify							
Total				24	2	3	19	8	56	48th		Total	—	—	—	—	—	—	—	—

=== Mediterranean Games ===
Mediterranean Games record
Year	Round	Pld	W	D	L	GF	GA
1951–1983	Did not enter						
(Syria) 1987	Group stage	3	0	1	2	0	7
1991–present	See San Marino national under-23 team						
Total	1/1	3	0	1	2	0	7

== All-time record ==
As of 12 November 2026

Team	Pld	W	D	L	GF	GA	GD	WPCT
Albania	6	0	0	6	1	18	−17	0.00
Andorra	5	0	1	4	0	9	−9	0.00
Austria	4	0	0	4	1	25	−24	0.00
Azerbaijan	3	0	0	3	2	8	−6	0.00
Bangladesh	1	0	0	1	1	2	−1	0.00
Belarus	4	0	0	4	0	13	−13	0.00
Belgium	8	0	0	8	3	46	−43	0.00
Bosnia and Herzegovina	4	0	0	4	1	13	−12	0.00
Bulgaria	2	0	0	2	0	7	−7	0.00
Cape Verde	1	0	0	1	0	2	−2	0.00
Croatia	3	0	0	3	0	18	−18	0.00
Cyprus	9	0	0	9	1	28	−27	0.00
Czech Republic	7	0	0	7	0	32	−32	0.00
Denmark	2	0	0	2	1	6	−5	0.00
England	8	0	0	8	1	52	−51	0.00
Estonia	5	0	1	4	0	9	−9	0.00
Faroe Islands	3	0	0	3	2	8	−6	0.00
Finland	8	0	0	8	4	37	−33	0.00
Germany	4	0	0	4	0	34	−34	0.00
Gibraltar	4	0	2	2	1	3	−2	0.00
Greece	2	0	0	2	0	6	−6	0.00
Hungary	6	0	0	6	0	26	−26	0.00
Iceland	1	0	0	1	0	1	−1	0.00
Israel	2	0	0	2	0	12	−12	0.00
Italy	3	0	0	3	0	15	−15	0.00
Kazakhstan	4	0	0	4	2	13	−11	0.00
Kosovo	1	0	0	1	1	4	−3	0.00
Latvia	5	0	1	4	1	9	−8	0.00
Liechtenstein	8	3	2	3	7	7	0	37.50
Lithuania	5	0	0	5	2	11	−9	0.00
Luxembourg	2	0	0	2	0	6	−6	0.00
Malta	4	0	0	4	3	9	−6	0.00
Moldova	9	0	0	9	0	18	−18	0.00
Montenegro	2	0	0	2	0	9	−9	0.00
Netherlands	6	0	0	6	0	39	−39	0.00
Northern Ireland	6	0	0	6	0	19	−19	0.00
Norway	4	0	0	4	1	24	−23	0.00
Poland	10	0	0	10	2	45	−43	0.00
Republic of Ireland	2	0	0	2	1	7	−6	0.00
Romania	5	0	0	5	3	22	−19	0.00
Russia	4	0	0	4	0	25	−25	0.00
Saint Kitts and Nevis	2	0	1	1	1	3	−2	0.00
Saint Lucia	2	0	1	1	1	2	−1	0.00
Scotland	8	0	0	8	0	27	−27	0.00
Serbia and Montenegro	2	0	0	2	0	8	−8	0.00
Seychelles	1	0	1	0	0	0	0	0.00
Slovakia	5	0	0	5	1	26	−25	0.00
Slovenia	7	0	0	7	0	26	−26	0.00
Spain	4	0	0	4	0	26	−26	0.00
Sweden	4	0	0	4	0	22	−22	0.00
Switzerland	4	0	0	4	0	22	−22	0.00
Turkey	4	0	1	3	1	16	−15	0.00
Ukraine	2	0	0	2	0	17	−17	0.00
Wales	4	0	0	4	1	16	−15	0.00
Total	231	3	11	217	47	908	−861	1.30

Source: Results

== See also ==
- Sport in San Marino
  - Football in San Marino
- San Marino Football Federation
- San Marino national football B team
- San Marino national under-21 football team
- San Marino national under-19 football team
- San Marino national under-17 football team
- San Marino women's national football team
