= ASD Tropical Coriano =

Italian football club

- Full name: Associazione Sportiva Dilettantistica Tropical Coriano
- Founded: 1953; 73 years ago
- Ground: Stadio Comunale Daniele Grandi
- Capacity: 1,500
- Manager: Roberto Di Maio
- League: Serie D/D
- Website: https://www.tropicalcoriano.it/

ASD Tropical Coriano is an Italian association football club, based in Coriano, Emilia-Romagna currently playing in Serie D.
