= San Marino national under-17 football team =

San Marino U17
- Association: Federazione Sammarinese Giuoco Calcio
- Head coach: (San Marino) Pietro Rossi
- Top scorer: Federico Raschi (3)
First colours	Second colours

First international
- San Marino 2–6 Romania (Serravalle, San Marino; 11 November 1987)

Biggest win
- Under-17; Andorra 1–2 San Marino (Andorra la Vella, Andorra; 4 March 2002); San Marino 1–0 Wales (Dogana, San Marino; 14 April 2026); Under-16; San Marino 5–1 Gibraltar (Acquaviva, San Marino; 26 August 2024)

Biggest defeat
- Netherlands 12–0 San Marino (Tbilisi, Georgia; 19 October 2013)

World Cup
- Appearances: None

European Championship
- Appearances: None

The San Marino national U-17 football team is the national under-17 football team of San Marino and is controlled by the San Marino Football Federation. The head coach is Pietro Rossi.

They have competed in the UEFA European Under-17 Championship qualifying rounds every year since 2003. They have so far played 44 official games with 40 defeats, three draws (against Andorra in 2012, Faroe Islands in 2005 and Armenia in 2015) and two victories (over Andorra in 2002 and Wales in 2026).

== Competitive record ==
=== FIFA Under-17 World Cup Record ===
- 1985–1991: Did not enter
- 1993: Did not qualify
- 1995: Did not enter
- 1997–2019: Did not qualify
- 2021: Cancelled
- 2023–2025: Did not qualify

=== UEFA U-16/17 Championship Record ===
UEFA European Under-16/17 Championship record								Qualification record					
Year	Round	Pld	W	D	L	GF	GA	Pld	W	D	L	GF	GA
(Italy) 1982	Did not enter							Did not enter					
(West Germany) 1984	Did not enter							Did not enter					
(Hungary) 1985	Did not enter							Did not enter					
(Greece) 1986	Did not enter							Did not enter					
(France) 1987	Did not enter							Did not enter					
(Spain) 1988	Did not qualify							2	0	0	2	3	11
(Denmark) 1989	Did not enter							Did not enter					
(East Germany) 1990	Did not qualify							2	0	0	2	0	7
(Switzerland) 1991	Did not enter							Did not enter					
(Cyprus) 1992	Did not enter							Did not enter					
(Turkey) 1993	Did not qualify							4	0	0	4	0	14
(Republic of Ireland) 1994	Did not enter							Did not enter					
(Belgium) 1995	Did not enter							Did not enter					
(Austria) 1996	Did not enter							Did not enter					
(Germany) 1997	Did not qualify							2	0	0	2	0	8
(Scotland) 1998	Did not qualify							2	0	0	2	1	16
(Czech Republic) 1999	Did not qualify							2	0	0	2	0	11
(Israel) 2000	Did not enter							Did not enter					
(England) 2001	Did not qualify							2	0	0	2	0	8
(Denmark) 2002	Did not qualify							2	1	0	1	2	3
(Portugal) 2003	Did not qualify							3	0	0	3	0	5
(France) 2004	Did not qualify							3	0	0	3	0	21
(Italy) 2005	Did not qualify							3	0	0	3	0	14
(Luxembourg) 2006	Did not qualify							3	0	1	2	3	18
(Belgium) 2007	Did not qualify							3	0	0	3	0	16
(Turkey) 2008	Did not qualify							3	0	0	3	1	13
(Germany) 2009	Did not qualify							3	0	0	3	0	9
(Liechtenstein) 2010	Did not qualify							3	0	0	3	0	18
(Serbia) 2011	Did not qualify							3	0	0	3	0	9
(Slovenia) 2012	Did not qualify							3	0	0	3	0	10
(Slovakia) 2013	Did not qualify							3	0	1	2	1	11
(Malta) 2014	Did not qualify							3	0	0	3	1	16
(Bulgaria) 2015	Did not qualify							3	0	0	3	1	11
(Azerbaijan) 2016	Did not qualify							3	0	1	2	1	14
(Croatia) 2017	Did not qualify							3	0	0	3	1	9
(England) 2018	Did not qualify							3	0	0	3	0	22
(Republic of Ireland) 2019	Did not qualify							3	0	0	3	0	20
(Estonia) 2020	Cancelled							3	0	0	3	0	20
(Israel) 2022	Did not qualify							3	0	0	3	1	22
(Hungary) 2023	Did not qualify							3	0	0	3	1	16
(Cyprus) 2024	Did not qualify							3	0	0	3	0	10
(Albania) 2025	Did not qualify							6	0	0	6	0	21
(Estonia) 2026	Did not qualify							6	1	0	5	3	16
(Latvia) 2027	Did not qualify							3	0	0	3	2	8
Total	–							96	2	3	91	22	427

== Current squad ==
The following players were called up for the most recent fixtures in 2026 UEFA European Under-17 Championship qualification.

No.	Pos.	Player	Date of birth (age)	Club
1	GK	Nicholas Bucci	23 October 2009 (age 17)	(San Marino Football Federation) San Marino Academy
12	GK	Ryan Michelotti	29 April 2010 (age 16)	(San Marino Football Federation) San Marino Academy
7	DF	Alberto Valentini	10 October 2009 (age 17)	(San Marino Football Federation) San Marino Academy
13	DF	Mattia Piergiacomi	7 April 2010 (age 16)	(San Marino Football Federation) San Marino Academy
15	DF	Edoardo Pala	11 August 2009 (age 17)	(San Marino Football Federation) San Marino Academy
17	DF	Daniele Balsimelli	7 September 2009 (age 17)	(San Marino Football Federation) San Marino Academy
2	DF	Matteo Sammaritani	7 June 2009 (age 17)	(San Marino Football Federation) San Marino Academy
5	DF	Victor Jourdain	6 March 2010 (age 16)	(French Football Federation) Annecy
6	DF	Diego Prendi	3 February 2010 (age 16)	(San Marino Football Federation) San Marino Academy
14	DF	Elia Zavoli	31 January 2009 (age 17)	
3	DF	Filippo Terni	1 March 2009 (age 17)	(Italian Football Federation) Cesena FC
4	MF	Francesco Mazza	12 September 2010 (age 16)	(San Marino Football Federation) San Marino Academy
8	MF	Giacomo Montali	7 May 2010 (age 16)	(Italian Football Federation) Cesena FC
11	MF	Alessandro Ciacci	10 November 2009 (age 17)	(San Marino Football Federation) San Marino Academy
16	MF	Gabriele Romiti	2 July 2009 (age 17)	(San Marino Football Federation) San Marino Academy
18	MF	Teo Cervellini	23 May 2009 (age 17)	(San Marino Football Federation) San Marino Academy
10	MF	Francesco Bucchi	16 April 2009 (age 17)	(San Marino Football Federation) San Marino Academy
9	FW	Achille Montebelli	23 April 2010 (age 16)	(Italian Football Federation) Cesena FC
19	FW	Samuel Baggiarini	22 December 2010 (age 15)	
20	FW	Federico Raschi	25 November 2009 (age 16)	(San Marino Football Federation) San Marino Academy
