= Romania national football team results (2020–present) =

This article provides details of international football games played by the Romania national football team from 2020 to present.

== Results ==
Key
| Win |
| Draw |
| Defeat |

=== 2020 ===
| 4 September 2020 2020–21 Nations League | Romania | 1–1 | Northern Ireland | Bucharest, Romania |
| 21:45 | Pușcaș 25' | Report | Whyte 86' | Stadium: Arena Națională; Attendance: 0 (Note: Due to the COVID-19 pandemic in Europe, all matches scheduled for September 2020 were played behind closed doors.); Referee: François Letexier (France) |

| 7 September 2020 2020–21 Nations League | Austria | 2–3 | Romania | Klagenfurt, Austria |
| 20:45 | Baumgartner 17'; Onisiwo 81' | Report | Alibec 3'; Grigore 51'; Maxim 70' | Stadium: Wörthersee Stadion; Attendance: 0 Referee: Glenn Nyberg (Sweden) |

| 8 October 2020 Euro 2020 qualifying play-offs | Iceland | 2–1 | Romania | Reykjavík, Iceland |
| 18:45 | G. Sigurðsson 16', 35' | Report | Maxim 63' (pen.) | Stadium: Laugardalsvöllur; Attendance: 60; Referee: Damir Skomina (Slovenia) |

| 11 October 2020 2020–21 Nations League | Norway | 4–0 | Romania | Oslo, Norway |
| 18:00 | Haaland 13', 64', 74'; Sørloth 39' | Report | | Stadium: Ullevaal Stadion; Attendance: 200; Referee: Ivan Kružliak (Slovakia) |

| 14 October 2020 2020–21 Nations League | Romania | 0–1 | Austria | Ploiești, Romania |
| 21:45 | | Report | Schöpf 76' | Stadium: Ilie Oană Stadium; Attendance: 0 Referee: Daniel Stefański (Poland) |

| 11 November 2020 Friendly | Romania | 5–3 | Belarus | Ploiești, Romania |
| 19:00 | Mitrea 11'; Marin 20' (pen.); Nedelcearu 31', 55'; Pușcaș 44' | Report | Kendysh 63'; Bakhar 80'; Klimovich 90+2' | Stadium: Ilie Oană Stadium; Attendance: 0 Referee: Georgi Kabakov (Bulgaria) |

| 15 November 2020 2020–21 Nations League | Romania | 3–0; Awarded (Note: The Romania versus Norway match was cancelled and awarded as a 3–0 win to Romania after the Norway national team were prohibited from travelling to Romania by the Norwegian government due to a positive SARS-CoV-2 test in the squad.) | Norway | Bucharest, Romania |
| 21:45 | | Report | | Stadium: Arena Națională; Referee: Ali Palabıyık (Turkey) |

| 18 November 2020 2020–21 Nations League | Northern Ireland | 1–1 | Romania | Belfast, Northern Ireland |
| 19:45 | Boyce 56' | Report | Bicfalvi 81' | Stadium: Windsor Park; Attendance: 1,060; Referee: Sandro Schärer (Switzerland) |

=== 2021 ===
| 25 March 2021 2022 World Cup qualification | Romania | 3–2 | North Macedonia | Bucharest, Romania |
| 21:45 | Tănase 28'; Mihăilă 50'; Hagi 86' | Report | Ademi 82'; Trajkovski 83' | Stadium: Arena Națională; Attendance: 0 Referee: Fabio Verissimo (Portugal) |

| 28 March 2021 2022 World Cup qualification | Romania | 0–1 | Germany | Bucharest, Romania |
| 21:45 | | Report | Gnabry 17' | Stadium: Arena Națională; Attendance: 0 Referee: Clément Turpin (France) |

| 31 March 2021 2022 World Cup qualification | Armenia | 3–2 | Romania | Yerevan, Armenia |
| 20:00 | Spertsyan 56'; Haroyan 87'; Barseghyan 89' (pen.) | Report | Cicâldău 62', 72' | Stadium: Vazgen Sargsyan Republican Stadium; Attendance: 4,300; Referee: Andris Treimanis (Latvia) |

| 2 June 2021 Friendly | Romania | 1–2 | Georgia | Ploiești, Romania |
| 20:45 | Ivan 78' | Report | Mikautadze 61'; Aburjania 71' | Stadium: Ilie Oană; Attendance: 1,000; Referee: Anastasios Sidiropoulos (Greece) |

| 6 June 2021 Friendly | England | 1–0 | Romania | Middlesbrough, England |
| 17:00 | Rashford 68' (pen.) | Report | | Stadium: Riverside Stadium; Attendance: 6,952; Referee: Tiago Martins (Portugal) |
Note: The match was originally scheduled for 7 June 2020 at the Villa Park, Birmingham, but postponed due to the COVID-19 pandemic in England.

| 2 September 2021 2022 World Cup qualification | Iceland | 0–2 | Romania | Reykjavík, Iceland |
| 18:45 | | Report | Man 47'; Stanciu 83' | Stadium: Laugardalsvöllur; Attendance: 1,961; Referee: Aleksei Kulbakov (Belarus) |

| 5 September 2021 2022 World Cup qualification | Romania | 2–0 | Liechtenstein | Bucharest, Romania |
| 21:45 | Toșca 11'; Manea 18' | Report | | Stadium: Arena Națională; Attendance: 9,404; Referee: Kateryna Monzul (Ukraine) |

| 8 September 2021 2022 World Cup qualification | North Macedonia | 0–0 | Romania | Skopje, North Macedonia |
| 20:45 | | Report | | Stadium: Toše Proeski Arena; Attendance: 5,260; Referee: Antonio Mateu Lahoz (Spain) |

| 8 October 2021 2022 World Cup qualification | Germany | 2–1 | Romania | Hamburg, Germany |
| 20:45 | Gnabry 52'; Müller 81' | Report | Hagi 9' | Stadium: Volksparkstadion; Attendance: 25,000; Referee: Cüneyt Çakır (Turkey) |

| 11 October 2021 2022 World Cup qualification | Romania | 1–0 | Armenia | Bucharest, Romania |
| 21:45 | Mitriță 26' | Report | | Stadium: Stadionul Steaua; Attendance: 13,576; Referee: Daniele Orsato (Italy) |

| 11 November 2021 2022 World Cup qualification | Romania | 0–0 | Iceland | Bucharest, Romania |
| 21:45 | | Report | | Stadium: Stadionul Steaua; Attendance: 0 Referee: Sergei Karasev (Russia) |

| 14 November 2021 2022 World Cup qualification | Liechtenstein | 0–2 | Romania | Vaduz, Liechtenstein |
| 18:00 | | Report | Man 8'; Bancu 87' | Stadium: Rheinpark Stadion; Attendance: 2,237; Referee: Matej Jug (Slovenia) |

=== 2022 ===
| 25 March 2022 Friendly | Romania | 0–1 | Greece | Bucharest, Romania |
| 20:15 UTC+3 | | Report | Bouchalakis 39' | Stadium: Stadionul Steaua; Attendance: 20,000; Referee: Ricardo de Burgos Bengoetxea (Spain) |

| 29 March 2022 Friendly | Israel | 2–2 | Romania | Netanya, Israel |
| 20:45 UTC+3 | Dabbur 57', 85' | Report | Cicâldău 10'; Man 23' | Stadium: Netanya Stadium; Attendance: 6,970; Referee: Daniel Stefański (Poland) |

| 4 June 2022 2022–23 Nations League | Montenegro | 2–0 | Romania | Podgorica, Montenegro |
| 20:45 | Mugoša 66'; Vukčević 87' | Report | | Stadium: Podgorica City Stadium; Attendance: 3,998; Referee: Andreas Ekberg (Sweden) |

| 7 June 2022 2022–23 Nations League | Bosnia and Herzegovina | 1–0 | Romania | Zenica, Bosnia and Herzegovina |
| 21:05 | Prevljak 68' | Report | | Stadium: Bilino Polje Stadium; Attendance: 4,500; Referee: Sascha Stegemann (Germany) |
Note: The match was originally scheduled to kick-off at 20:45 but was delayed to 21:05 due to adverse weather conditions.

| 11 June 2022 2022–23 Nations League | Romania | 1–0 | Finland | Bucharest, Romania |
| 21:45 | Bancu 30' | Report | | Stadium: Stadionul Rapid-Giulești; Attendance: 11,503; Referee: Harald Lechner (Austria) |

| 14 June 2022 2022–23 Nations League | Romania | 0–3 | Montenegro | Bucharest, Romania |
| 21:45 | | Report | Mugoša 42', 56', 63' | Stadium: Stadionul Rapid-Giulești; Attendance: 11,657; Referee: João Pinheiro (Portugal) |

| 23 September 2022 2022–23 Nations League | Finland | 1–1 | Romania | Helsinki, Finland |
| 21:45 | Pukki 12' | Report | Tănase 52' | Stadium: Helsinki Olympic Stadium; Attendance: 20,130; Referee: Carlos del Cerro Grande (Spain) |

| 26 September 2022 2022–23 Nations League | Romania | 4–1 | Bosnia and Herzegovina | Bucharest, Romania |
| 21:45 | Man 38'; Pușcaș 73', 86'; Rațiu 79' | Report | Džeko 77' | Stadium: Stadionul Rapid-Giulești; Attendance: 12,693; Referee: Halil Umut Meler (Turkey) |

| 17 November 2022 Friendly | Romania | 1–2 | Slovenia | Cluj-Napoca, Romania |
| 18:30 | Drăguș 64' | Report | Šeško 26'; Šporar 32' | Stadium: Cluj Arena; Attendance: 6,845; Referee: Nicolas Laforge (Belgium) |

| 20 November 2022 Friendly | Moldova | 0–5 | Romania | Chișinău, Moldova |
| 20:30 | | Report | Moruțan 9'; Drăguș 40'; Cicâldău 61'; Paraschiv 71' (pen.); Rus 88' | Stadium: Zimbru Stadium; Attendance: 6,145; Referee: Yaşar Kemal Uğurlu (Turkey) |

=== 2023 ===
| 25 March 2023 Euro 2024 qualifying | Andorra | 0–2 | Romania | Andorra la Vella, Andorra |
| 20:45 | | Report | Man 35'; Alibec 50' | Stadium: Estadi Nacional; Attendance: 2,927; Referee: Dario Bel (Croatia) |

| 28 March 2023 Euro 2024 qualifying | Romania | 2–1 | Belarus | Bucharest, Romania |
| 21:45 | Stanciu 17'; Burcă 19' | Report | Morozov 86' | Stadium: Arena Națională; Attendance: 27,837; Referee: Allard Lindhout (Netherlands) |

| 16 June 2023 Euro 2024 qualifying | Kosovo | 0–0 | Romania | Pristina, Kosovo |
| 20:45 | | Report | | Stadium: Fadil Vokrri Stadium; Attendance: 11,000; Referee: Danny Makkelie (Netherlands) |

| 19 June 2023 Euro 2024 qualifying | Switzerland | 2–2 | Romania | Lucerne, Switzerland |
| 20:45 | Amdouni 28', 41' | Report | Mihăilă 89', 90+2' | Stadium: Swissporarena; Attendance: 14,000; Referee: Daniele Orsato (Italy) |

| 9 September 2023 Euro 2024 qualifying | Romania | 1–1 | Israel | Bucharest, Romania |
| 21:45 | Alibec 27' | Report | Gloukh 54' | Stadium: Arena Națională; Attendance: 49,193; Referee: Slavko Vinčić (Slovenia) |

| 12 September 2023 Euro 2024 qualifying | Romania | 2–0 | Kosovo | Bucharest, Romania |
| 21:45 | Stanciu 83'; Mihăilă 90+3' | Report | | Stadium: Arena Națională; Attendance: 29,982; Referee: Willy Delajod (France) |

| 12 October 2023 Euro 2024 qualifying | Belarus | 0–0 | Romania | Budapest, Hungary |
| 20:45 | | Report | | Stadium: Szusza Ferenc Stadion; Attendance: 0 Referee: Espen Eskås (Norway) |

| 15 October 2023 Euro 2024 qualifying | Romania | 4–0 | Andorra | Bucharest, Romania |
| 21:45 | Stanciu 23'; Hagi 28'; R. Marin 44' (pen.); Coman 50' | Report | | Stadium: Arena Națională; Attendance: 21,723; Referee: Kristo Tohver (Estonia) |

| 18 November 2023 Euro 2024 qualifying | Israel | 1–2 | Romania | Felcsut, Hungary (Note: The Israel v Romania match, originally scheduled to be played at the Teddy Stadium, Jerusalem, was relocated to a neutral site due to the Gaza war.) |
| 21:45 | | Report | | Stadium: Pancho Arena; Attendance: 0 Referee: Anthony Taylor (England) |

| 21 November 2023 Euro 2024 qualifying | Romania | 1–0 | Switzerland | Bucharest, Romania |
| 21:45 | Alibec 50' | Report | | Stadium: Arena Națională; Attendance: 50,224; Referee: Davide Massa (Italy) |

=== 2024 ===
| 22 March 2024 Friendly | Romania | 1–1 | Northern Ireland | Bucharest, Romania |
| 19:45 | Man 23' | Report | Reid 7' | Stadium: Arena Naţională; Attendance: 30,439; Referee: Kristoffer Karlsson (Sweden) |

| 26 March 2024 Friendly | Colombia | 3–2 | Romania | Madrid, Spain |
| 19:30 | Córdoba 6'; Arias 35'; Asprilla 79' | Report | Hagi 84'; Tănase 90+3' | Stadium: Metropolitano Stadium; Attendance: 35,940; Referee: Alejandro Muñiz Ruiz (Spain) |

| 4 June 2024 Friendly | Romania | 0–0 | Bulgaria | Bucharest, Romania |
| 19:30 | Man (penalty missed) 51' | Report | | Stadium: Stadionul Steaua; Attendance: 19,024; Referee: Atilla Karaoğlan (Turkey) |

| 8 June 2024 Friendly | Romania | 0–0 | Liechtenstein | Bucharest, Romania |
| 19:00 | | Report | | Stadium: Stadionul Steaua; Attendance: 9,404; Referee: Menelaos Antoniou (Cyprus) |

| 17 June 2024 Euro 2024 Group E | Romania | 3–0 | Ukraine | Munich, Germany |
| 15:00 | Stanciu 29'; R. Marin 53'; Drăguș 57' | Report | | Stadium: Allianz Arena; Attendance: 61,591; Referee: Glenn Nyberg (Sweden) |

| 22 June 2024 Euro 2024 Group E | Belgium | 2–0 | Romania | Cologne, Germany |
| 21:00 | Tielemans 2'; De Bruyne 80' | Report | | Stadium: RheinEnergieStadion; Attendance: 42,535; Referee: Szymon Marciniak (Poland) |

| 26 June 2024 Euro 2024 Group E | Slovakia | 1–1 | Romania | Frankfurt, Germany |
| 18:00 | Duda 24' | Report | Marin 37' (pen.) | Stadium: Waldstadion; Attendance: 45,033; Referee: Daniel Siebert (Germany) |

| 2 July 2024 Euro 2024 Round of 16 | Romania | 0–3 | Netherlands | Munich, Germany |
| 18:00 CEST (UTC+2) | | Report | Gakpo 20'; Malen 83', 90+3' | Stadium: Allianz Arena; Attendance: 65,012; Referee: Felix Zwayer (Germany) |

| 6 September 2024 2024–25 Nations League | Kosovo | 0–3 | Romania | Pristina, Kosovo |
| 20:45 (21:45 UTC+3) | | Report | Man 40'; R. Marin 51' (pen.); Drăguș 82' | Stadium: Fadil Vokrri Stadium; Attendance: 12,872; Referee: Aliyar Aghayev (Azerbaijan) |

| 9 September 2024 2024–25 Nations League | Romania | 3–1 | Lithuania | Bucharest, Romania |
| 20:45 (21:45 UTC+3) | Mihăilă 4'; R. Marin 87' (pen.); Mitriță 90+2' | Report | Kučys 34' | Stadium: Steaua Stadium; Attendance: 28,168; Referee: Rade Obrenović (Slovenia) |

| 12 October 2024 2024–25 Nations League | Cyprus | 0–3 | Romania | Larnaca, Cyprus |
| 20:45 (21:45 UTC+3) | | Report | Man 16'; R. Marin 25' (pen.); Drăgușin 36' | Stadium: AEK Arena – Georgios Karapatakis; Attendance: 6,092; Referee: Sascha Stegemann (Germany) |

| 15 October 2024 2024–25 Nations League | Lithuania | 1–2 | Romania | Kaunas, Lithuania |
| 20:45 (21:45 UTC+3) | Kučys 7' (pen.) | Report | R. Marin 18' (pen.); Drăguș 65' | Stadium: Darius and Girėnas Stadium; Attendance: 2,585; Referee: Nick Walsh (Scotland) |

| 15 November 2024 2024–25 Nations League | Romania | 3–0; Awarded (Note: The Romania v Kosovo match was suspended at 0–0 during second-half stoppage time, after Romanian supporters allegedly began chanting pro-Serbian and anti-Kosovo slogans. The Kosovo team left the pitch, with the match abandoned thereafter. On 20 November 2024, UEFA announced the match had been awarded as a 3–0 win for Romania.) | Kosovo | Bucharest, Romania |
| 20:45 (21:45 UTC+2) | | Report | | Stadium: Arena Națională; Attendance: 48,957; Referee: Morten Krogh (Denmark) |

| 18 November 2024 2024–25 Nations League | Romania | 4–1 | Cyprus | Bucharest, Romania |
| 20:45 (21:45 UTC+2) | Bîrligea 2'; R. Marin 41', 80'; Coman 83' | Report | Pittas 52' | Stadium: Arena Națională; Attendance: 45,318; Referee: Luca Pairetto (Italy) |

=== 2025 ===
| 21 March 2025 2026 World Cup qualification | Romania | 0–1 | Bosnia and Herzegovina | Bucharest, Romania |
| 20:45 (21:45 UTC+2) | | Report | Gigović 14' | Stadium: Arena Națională; Attendance: 49,413; Referee: Danny Makkelie (Netherlands) |

| 24 March 2025 2026 World Cup qualification | San Marino | 1–5 | Romania | Serravlle, San Marino |
| 20:45 | Zannoni 67' | Report | Cevoli 6' (o.g.); Popescu 44'; R. Marin 55' (pen.); Hagi 75' (pen.); Alibec 90+4' | Stadium: San Marino Stadium; Attendance: 3,556; Referee: Damian Sylwestrzak (Poland) |

| 7 June 2025 2026 World Cup qualification | Austria | 2–1 | Romania | Vienna, Austria |
| 20:45 | Gregoritsch 42'; Sabitzer 60' | Report | Tănase 90+5' | Stadium: Ernst-Happel-Stadion; Attendance: 48,500; Referee: Maurizio Mariani (Italy) |

| 10 June 2025 2026 World Cup qualification | Romania | 2–0 | Cyprus | Bucharest, Romania |
| 20:45 (21:45 UTC+3) | Tănase 43'; Man 45+2' | Report | | Stadium: Arena Națională; Attendance: 43,524; Referee: Donatas Rumšas (Lithuania) |

| 5 September 2025 Friendly | Romania | 0–3 | Canada | Bucharest, Romania |
| 21:00 (UTC+3) | | Report | J. David 11'; Ahmed 22'; Sigur 77' | Stadium: Arena Națională; Attendance: 29,125; Referee: Lothar D'hondt (Belgium) |

| 9 September 2025 2026 World Cup qualification | Cyprus | 2–2 | Romania | Nicosia, Cyprus |
| 20:45 (21:45 UTC+3) | Loizou 29'; Charalampous 76' | Report | Drăguş 2', 18' | Stadium: GSP Stadium; Attendance: 4,875; Referee: Matej Jug (Slovenia) |

| 9 October 2025 Friendly | Romania | 2–1 | Moldova | Bucharest, Romania |
| 21:00 (UTC+3) | Munteanu 12'; Hagi 44' | Report | Radu 38' (o.g.) | Stadium: Arena Națională; Attendance: 11,232; Referee: Ishmael Barbara (Malta) |

| 12 October 2025 2026 World Cup qualification | Romania | 1–0 | Austria | Bucharest, Romania |
| 20:45 (21:45 UTC+3) | Ghiță 90+5' | Report | | Stadium: Arena Națională; Attendance: 39,581; Referee: Davide Massa (Italy) |

| 15 November 2025 2026 World Cup qualification | Bosnia and Herzegovina | 3–1 | Romania | Zenica, Bosnia and Herzegovina |
| 20:45 | Džeko 49'; Bajraktarević 79'; Tabaković 90+3' | Report | Bîrligea 17' | Stadium: Bilino Polje Stadium; Attendance: 11,459; Referee: Michael Oliver (England) |

| 18 November 2025 2026 World Cup qualification | Romania | 7–1 | San Marino | Ploiești, Romania |
| 20:45 (21:45 UTC+2) | Rossi 13' (o.g.); Baiaram 29'; Man 42'; Valentini 57' (o.g.); Hagi 76'; Rațiu 82'; Munteanu 86' (pen.) | Report | Giacopetti 2' | Stadium: Ilie Oană Stadium; Attendance: 8,426; Referee: Mohammad Al-Emara (Finland) |

=== 2026 ===
| 26 March 2026 2026 World Cup qualification play-offs | Turkey | 1–0 | Romania | Istanbul, Turkey |
| 18:00 (20:00 UTC+3) | Kadıoğlu 53' | Report | | Stadium: Beşiktaş Stadium; Attendance: 38,979; Referee: François Letexier (France) |

| 31 March 2026 Friendly | Slovakia | 2–0 | Romania | Bratislava, Slovakia |
| 20:45 UTC+2 | Birligea 7' (o.g.); Strelec 46' | Report | | Stadium: Tehelné pole Attendance: 8,043; Referee: Ondrej Berka (Czech Republic) |

| 2 June 2026 Friendly | Georgia | 1–1 | Romania | Tbilisi, Georgia |
| 20:00 UTC+3 | Kvilitaia 46' | Report | Munteanu 55' | Stadium: Mikheil Meskhi Stadium; Attendance: 14,702; Referee: Mohammed Al Mazeed (Qatar) |

| 6 June 2026 Friendly | Romania | 2–1 | Wales | Bucharest, Romania |
| 20:45 UTC+3 | Coman 52'; Rus 80' | Report | Brooks 63' | Stadium: Steaua Stadium; Attendance: 23,276; Referee: Rohit Saggi (Norway) |

| 25 September 2026 2026–27 Nations League | Sweden | 2–1 | Romania | Solna, Sweden |
| 20:45 UTC+2 | Isak 20'; Gyökeres 43' | Report | Man 29' | Stadium: Nationalarenan; Attendance: 31,882; Referee: Ondřej Berka (Czech Republic) |

| 28 September 2026 2026–27 Nations League | Romania | 2–4 | Bosnia and Herzegovina | Bucharest, Romania |
| 21:45 UTC+3 | Bîrligea 28'; Cicâldău 62' | Report | Gigović 12'; Muharemović 19'; Tabaković 40'; Mahmić 55' | Stadium: Arena Națională; Attendance: 0 Referee: Luis Godinho (Portugal) |

| 2 October 2026 2026–27 Nations League | Poland | 6–0 | Romania | Warsaw, Poland |
| 20:45 UTC+2 | Lewandowski 24' (pen.), 47', 86'; Ghiță 49' (o.g.); Zieliński 62'; Bednarek 66' | Report | | Stadium: Stadion Narodowy; Attendance: 51,054; Referee: Urs Schnyder (Switzerland) |

| 5 October 2026 2026–27 Nations League | Romania | 0–1 | Sweden | Bucharest, Romania |
| 21:45 UTC+3 | 0–1 | Report | Gyokeres 13' | Stadium: Arena Națională; Attendance: 49.426; Referee: Elchin Masiyev (Azerbaijan) |

| 14 November 2026 2026–27 Nations League | Romania | 2–1 | Poland | Bucharest, Romania |
| 21:45 UTC+2 | Cicâldău 68'; Man 72' | Report | Reguła 82' | Stadium: Arena Națională; Attendance: 45,827; Referee: Sebastian Gishamer (Austria) |

| 17 November 2026 2026–27 Nations League | Bosnia and Herzegovina | 2–1 | Romania | Zenica, Bosnia and Herzegovina |
| 20:45 UTC+1 | Tahirović 44'; Bajraktarević 82' | Report | Birgilea 6' | Stadium: Stadion Bilino Polje; Attendance: 11,460; Referee: José María Sánchez Martínez (Spain) |
