= Romania national football team results =

For Romania national football team results see:

- Romania national football team results (1922–39)
- Romania national football team results (1940–59)
- Romania national football team results (1960–79)
- Romania national football team results (1980–99)
- Romania national football team results (2000–19)
- Romania national football team results (2020–present)
