= List of Romania national football team hat-tricks =

This page is a list of the hat-tricks scored for the Romania national football team. Since Romania's first international association football match in 1922, there have been 24 occasions when a Romanian player has scored three or more goals (a hat-trick) in a game. The first hat-trick was scored by Gheorghe Ciolac against Bulgaria on 21 April 1929. The record for the most goals scored in an international game by a Romanian player is five, which has been achieved on just one occasion: by Rudolf Wetzer against Greece in 1930, at the 1929–31 Balkan Cup.

Iuliu Bodola holds the record for the most hat-tricks scored by a Romanian player with three, the first two coming in 1931 in a Friendly against Lithuania and in a Balkan Cup match against Greece, and his third came at the 1936 Friendship Cup in a 3–2 win over Yugoslavia. He is closely followed by the likes of Gheorghe Ciolac, Florin Răducioiu and Gheorghe Popescu.

== Hat-tricks scored by Romania ==
No.	Player	Opponent	Goals (Note: Goals column is sorted by the time elapsed between the first and the third goal.)	Score (Note: Romania's score is shown first. Scores are sorted by goal difference and number of goals in the match.)	Venue	Competition	Date	Ref(s)
1	Gheorghe Ciolac	Bulgaria	3 – (64', 71', 73')	3–0	ONEF Stadium, Bucharest	Friendly	21 April 1929	
2	Rudolf Wetzer	Greece	5 – (8', 34', 75', 76', 80')	8–1	ONEF Stadium, Bucharest	1929–31 Balkan Cup	25 May 1930	
3	Iuliu Bodola	Lithuania	3 – (3', 41', 81')	4–2	LFLS Stadionas, Kaunas	Friendly	26 August 1931	
4	Iuliu Bodola	Greece	3 – (13', 35', 84')	4–2	Leoforos Alexandras Stadium, Athens	1929–31 Balkan Cup	29 November 1931	
5	Gheorghe Ciolac	Bulgaria	3 – (57', 61', 66')	7–0	ONEF Stadium, Bucharest	1933 Balkan Cup	4 June 1933	
6	Grațian Sepi	Hungary	4 – (8', 32', 47', 83')	5–1	ONEF Stadium, Bucharest	1931–1934 Central European Cup for Amateurs	24 September 1933	
7	Iuliu Bodola	(Kingdom of Yugoslavia) Yugoslavia	3 – (21', 46', 51')	3–2	ONEF Stadium, Bucharest	1936 King Carol II Cup	10 May 1936	
8	Iuliu Farkaș	Albania	3 – (29', 69', 79')	4–0	Qemal Stafa Stadium, Tirana	1947 Balkan Cup	25 May 1947	
9	Gheorghe Váczi	East Germany	3 – (23', 32', 43')	3–1	ONEF Stadium, Bucharest	Friendly	26 October 1952	
10	Mircea Dridea	Poland	3 – (26', 45', 55')	3–2	Stadion Dziesięciolecia Manifestu Lipcowego, Warsaw	Friendly	30 August 1959	
11	Constantin Frățilă	Switzerland	3 – (12', 25', 38')	4–2	Stadionul Republicii, Bucharest	UEFA Euro 1968 qualifying	2 November 1966	
12	Emil Dumitriu	Cyprus	3 – (24', 52', 77')	7–0	Stadionul Național, Bucharest	UEFA Euro 1968 qualifying	23 April 1967	
13	Ion Dumitru	Greece	3 – (7', 32', 77')	6–1	Stadionul Steaua, Bucharest	Friendly	21 September 1977	
14	Anghel Iordănescu	(Socialist Federal Republic of Yugoslavia) Yugoslavia	3 – (21', 55', 79')	4–1	Stadionul Național, Bucharest	1977–80 Balkan Cup final	27 August 1980	
15	Gabi Balint	Faroe Islands	3 – (3', 39', 78')	7–0	Stadionul Steaua, Bucharest	1994 FIFA World Cup qualification	6 May 1992	
16	Florin Răducioiu	Faroe Islands	4 – (23', 58', 60', 76')	4–0	Svangaskarð, Toftir	1994 FIFA World Cup qualification	8 September 1993	
17	Florin Răducioiu	Azerbaijan	3 – (1', 68', 76')	4–1	Hüseyin Avni Aker Stadium, Trabzon	UEFA Euro 1996 qualifying	26 April 1995	
18	Viorel Moldovan	(Georgia (country)) Georgia	3 – (26', 29', 36')	5–0	Stadionul Ghencea, Bucharest	Friendly	24 April 1996	
19	Gheorghe Popescu	North Macedonia	3 – (36', 45', 90')	3–0	Gradski Stadium Skopje, Skopje	1998 FIFA World Cup qualification	14 December 1996	
20	Gheorghe Popescu	Liechtenstein	4 – (28', 30', 68', 82')	8–0	Stadionul Steaua, Bucharest	1998 FIFA World Cup qualification	29 March 1997	
21	Dorinel Munteanu	Liechtenstein	3 – (44', 45', 69')	8–1	Sportpark Eschen-Mauren, Eschen	1998 FIFA World Cup qualification	6 September 1997	
22	Adrian Ilie	Liechtenstein	3 – (32', 45', 53')	7–0	Stadionul Steaua, Bucharest	UEFA Euro 2000 qualifying	2 September 1998	
23	Cosmin Contra	Luxembourg	3 – (45', 47', 85')	7–0	Stade Josy Barthel, Luxembourg City, Luxembourg	UEFA Euro 2004 qualifying	16 October 2002	
24	Ciprian Marica	Trinidad and Tobago	3 – (31', 33', 81')	4–0	Arena Națională, Bucharest	Friendly	4 June 2013	

== Hat-tricks conceded by Romania ==
No.	Player	Opponent	Goals	Score	Venue	Competition	Date	Ref(s)
1	Karl Kanhäuser	Austria	3 – (2', 52', 85')	1–4	Simmeringer Had, Vienna	Friendly	20 May 1924	
2	Kees Pijl	Netherlands	4 – (28', 52', 60', 67')	0–6	Stade Olympique de Colombes, Colombes	1924 Summer Olympics	27 May 1924	
3	Józef Nawrot	Poland	3 – (8', 25', 78')	0–5	Stadionul ONEF, Colombes	Friendly	3 October 1932	
4	Axel Nilsson	Sweden	3 – (70', 73', 87')	1–7	Stockholms Olympiastadion, Stockholm	Friendly	1 September 1935	
5	Josef Bican	Czechoslovakia	4 – (28', 49', 61', 81')	2–6	Stadion Letná, Prague	1937–38 Eduard Benes Cup	4 December 1938	
6	Fritz Walter	(Nazi Germany) Germany	3 – (33', 76', 81')	3–9	Waldstadion, Frankfurt	Friendly	14 July 1940	
7	Fritz Walter	(Nazi Germany) Germany	3 – (44', 49', 55')	0–7	Stadion Edwarda Szymkowiaka, Bytom	Friendly	16 August 1942	
8	Béla Egresi	Hungary	3 – (43', 61', 72')	0–9	Megyeri úti Stadion, Budapest	1948 Balkan Cup	6 June 1948	
9	Ferenc Puskás	Hungary	3 – (44', 64', 83')	1–5	Stadionul Republicii, Bucharest	1948 Balkan Cup	24 October 1948	
10	Gerard Cieślik	Poland	3 – (18', 25', 76')	3–3	Stadion Olimpijski, Wrocław	Friendly	14 May 1950	
11	Vicente Guillot	Spain	3 – (7', 20', 70')	0–6	Estadio Santiago Bernabéu, Madrid	1964 European Nations' Cup qualifying	1 November 1962	
12	Safet Sušić	(Socialist Federal Republic of Yugoslavia) Yugoslavia	3 – (14', 51', 62')	0–4	Stadionul Steaua, Bucharest	1978 FIFA World Cup qualification	13 November 1977	
13	Peter Dubovský	Czechoslovakia	3 – (59', 83', 90')	2–5	Všešportový areál, Košice	1994 FIFA World Cup qualification	2 June 1993	
14	Robert Lewandowski	Poland	3 – (29', 57', 62')	1–3	Stadion Narodowy, Warsaw	2018 FIFA World Cup qualification	10 June 2017	
15	Erling Haaland	Norway	3 – (13', 64', 74')	0–4	Ullevaal Stadion, Oslo	2020–21 UEFA Nations League	11 October 2020	
16	Stefan Mugoša	Montenegro	3 – (42', 56', 63')	0–3	Stadionul Rapid-Giulești, Bucharest	2022–23 UEFA Nations League	14 June 2022	
17	Robert Lewandowski	Poland	3 – (24', 47', 86')	0–6	Stadion Narodowy, Warsaw	2026-27 UEFA Nations League	2 October 2026	

== See also ==
- Romania national football team results
