= 2026 FIFA World Cup qualification – UEFA Group H =

Association football tournament group

The 2026 FIFA World Cup qualification UEFA Group H was one of the twelve UEFA groups in the World Cup qualification tournament to decide which teams would qualify for the 2026 FIFA World Cup final tournament in Canada, Mexico and the United States. Group H consisted of five teams: Austria, Bosnia and Herzegovina, Cyprus, Romania and San Marino. The teams played against each other home-and-away in a round-robin format from March to November 2025. However, as Austria were involved in the Nations League promotion/relegation play-offs in March, they began their qualifying campaign in June 2025.

The group winners, Austria, qualified directly for the World Cup finals, while the runners-up, Bosnia and Herzegovina, advanced to the second round (play-offs). In addition, Romania advanced to the play-offs via their Nations League ranking.

== Standings ==
| Pos | Team | Pld | W | D | L | GF | GA | GD | Pts | Qualification | (Austria national football team) | (Bosnia and Herzegovina national football team) | (Romania national football team) | (Cyprus national football team) | (San Marino national football team) |
|---|---|---|---|---|---|---|---|---|---|---|---|---|---|---|---|
| 1 | Austria | 8 | 6 | 1 | 1 | 22 | 4 | +18 | 19 | Qualification for 2026 FIFA World Cup | — | 1–1 | 2–1 | 1–0 | 10–0 |
| 2 | Bosnia and Herzegovina | 8 | 5 | 2 | 1 | 17 | 7 | +10 | 17 | Advance to play-offs | 1–2 | — | 3–1 | 2–1 | 1–0 |
| 3 | Romania | 8 | 4 | 1 | 3 | 19 | 10 | +9 | 13 | Advance to play-offs via Nations League | 1–0 | 0–1 | — | 2–0 | 7–1 |
| 4 | Cyprus | 8 | 2 | 2 | 4 | 11 | 11 | 0 | 8 | | 0–2 | 2–2 | 2–2 | — | 2–0 |
| 5 | San Marino | 8 | 0 | 0 | 8 | 2 | 39 | −37 | 0 | | 0–4 | 0–6 | 1–5 | 0–4 | — |

Source: FIFA, UEFA
Rules for classification: Tiebreakers

== Matches ==
The fixture list was confirmed by UEFA on 13 December 2024 following the draw. Times are CET/CEST, (Note: CET (UTC+1) for matches until 29 March and from 26 October (matchday 1–2 and 9–10), and CEST (UTC+2) for matches from 30 March to 25 October 2025 (matchday 3–8).) as listed by UEFA (local times, if different, are in parentheses).

21 March 2025
18:00 (19:00 UTC+2)

| Cyprus | 2–0 | San Marino |
|---|---|---|
| Pittas 55'; Kakoullis 86' | Report (FIFA); Report (UEFA) |

AEK Arena, Larnaca
Attendance: 2,336
Referee: Andris Treimanis (Latvia)
21 March 2025
20:45 (21:45 UTC+2)

| Romania | 0–1 | Bosnia and Herzegovina |
|---|---|---|
| | Report (FIFA); Report (UEFA) | Gigović 14' |

Arena Națională, Bucharest
Attendance: 49,413
Referee: Danny Makkelie (Netherlands)

24 March 2025
20:45

| Bosnia and Herzegovina | 2–1 | Cyprus |
|---|---|---|
| Demirović 22'; Hajradinović 56' | Report (FIFA); Report (UEFA) | Pittas 45+2' |

Bilino Polje Stadium, Zenica
Attendance: 7,464
Referee: Rohit Saggi (Norway)
24 March 2025
20:45

| San Marino | 1–5 | Romania |
|---|---|---|
| Zannoni 67' | Report (FIFA); Report (UEFA) | Cevoli 6' (o.g.); Popescu 44'; R. Marin 55' (pen.); Hagi 75' (pen.); Alibec 90+4' |

San Marino Stadium, Serravalle
Attendance: 3,556
Referee: Damian Sylwestrzak (Poland)

7 June 2025
15:00

| Bosnia and Herzegovina | 1–0 | San Marino |
|---|---|---|
| Džeko 66' | Report (FIFA); Report (UEFA) |

Bilino Polje Stadium, Zenica
Attendance: 11,828
Referee: Luís Godinho (Portugal)
7 June 2025
20:45

| Austria | 2–1 | Romania |
|---|---|---|
| Gregoritsch 42'; Sabitzer 60' | Report (FIFA); Report (UEFA) | Tănase 90+5' |

Ernst-Happel-Stadion, Vienna
Attendance: 48,500
Referee: Maurizio Mariani (Italy)

10 June 2025
20:45 (21:45 UTC+3)

| Romania | 2–0 | Cyprus |
|---|---|---|
| Tănase 43'; Man 45+2' | Report (FIFA); Report (UEFA) |

Arena Națională, Bucharest
Attendance: 45,324
Referee: Donatas Rumšas (Lithuania)
10 June 2025
20:45

| San Marino | 0–4 | Austria |
|---|---|---|
| | Report (FIFA); Report (UEFA) | Arnautović 3', 15'; Gregoritsch 11'; Baumgartner 27' |

San Marino Stadium, Serravalle
Attendance: 3,075
Referee: Ondřej Berka (Czech Republic)

6 September 2025
20:45

| Austria | 1–0 | Cyprus |
|---|---|---|
| Sabitzer 54' (pen.) | Report (FIFA); Report (UEFA) |

Raiffeisen Arena, Linz
Attendance: 16,300
Referee: Jakob Kehlet (Denmark)
6 September 2025
20:45

| San Marino | 0–6 | Bosnia and Herzegovina |
|---|---|---|
| | Report (FIFA); Report (UEFA) | Tahirović 21'; Džeko 70', 72'; Baždar 81'; Alajbegović 85'; Mujakić 90' |

San Marino Stadium, Serravalle
Attendance: 2,740
Referee: Enea Jorgji (Albania)

9 September 2025
20:45

| Bosnia and Herzegovina | 1–2 | Austria |
|---|---|---|
| Džeko 50' | Report (FIFA); Report (UEFA) | Sabitzer 49'; Laimer 65' |

Bilino Polje Stadium, Zenica
Attendance: 11,700
Referee: Jesús Gil Manzano (Spain)
9 September 2025
20:45 (21:45 UTC+3)

| Cyprus | 2–2 | Romania |
|---|---|---|
| Loizou 29'; Charalampous 76' | Report (FIFA); Report (UEFA) | Drăguș 2', 18' |

GSP Stadium, Nicosia
Attendance: 4,875
Referee: Matej Jug (Slovenia)

9 October 2025
20:45

| Austria | 10–0 | San Marino |
|---|---|---|
| Schmid 7'; Arnautović 8', 47', 83', 84'; Gregoritsch 24'; Posch 30', 42'; Laimer 45'; Wurmbrand 76' | Report (FIFA); Report (UEFA) |

Ernst-Happel-Stadion, Vienna
Attendance: 37,500
Referee: Yigal Frid (Israel)
9 October 2025
20:45 (21:45 UTC+3)

| Cyprus | 2–2 | Bosnia and Herzegovina |
|---|---|---|
| Laifis 45+1'; Pittas 90+7' (pen.) | Report (FIFA); Report (UEFA) | Katić 10'; Michail 36' (o.g.) |

AEK Arena, Larnaca
Attendance: 2,355
Referee: Lawrence Visser (Belgium)

12 October 2025
15:00

| San Marino | 0–4 | Cyprus |
|---|---|---|
| | Report (FIFA); Report (UEFA) | Loizou 9'; Andreou 59'; Kastanos 67' (pen.); Kakoullis 79' |

San Marino Stadium, Serravalle
Attendance: 598
Referee: Aliyar Aghayev (Azerbaijan)
12 October 2025
20:45 (21:45 UTC+3)

| Romania | 1–0 | Austria |
|---|---|---|
| Ghiță 90+5' | Report (FIFA); Report (UEFA) |

Arena Națională, Bucharest
Attendance: 39,581
Referee: Davide Massa (Italy)

15 November 2025
18:00 (19:00 UTC+2)

| Cyprus | 0–2 | Austria |
|---|---|---|
| | Report (FIFA); Report (UEFA) | Arnautović 18' (pen.), 55' |

Alphamega Stadium, Limassol
Attendance: 6,012
Referee: Urs Schnyder (Switzerland)
15 November 2025
20:45

| Bosnia and Herzegovina | 3–1 | Romania |
|---|---|---|
| Džeko 49'; Bajraktarević 79'; Tabaković 90+3' | Report (FIFA); Report (UEFA) | Bîrligea 17' |

Bilino Polje Stadium, Zenica
Attendance: 11,459
Referee: Michael Oliver (England)

18 November 2025
20:45

| Austria | 1–1 | Bosnia and Herzegovina |
|---|---|---|
| Gregoritsch 77' | Report (FIFA); Report (UEFA) | Tabaković 12' |

Ernst-Happel-Stadion, Vienna
Attendance: 48,000
Referee: João Pinheiro (Portugal)
18 November 2025
20:45 (21:45 UTC+2)

| Romania | 7–1 | San Marino |
|---|---|---|
| Rossi 13' (o.g.); Baiaram 29'; Man 42'; Valentini 57' (o.g.); Hagi 76'; Rațiu 82'; Munteanu 86' (pen.) | Report (FIFA); Report (UEFA) | Giacopetti 2' |

Ilie Oană Stadium, Ploiești
Attendance: 8,426
Referee: Mohammad Al-Emara (Finland)

== Goalscorers ==
There were 71 goals scored in 20 matches, for an average of 3.55 goals per match.

8 goals

- (Austria national football team) Marko Arnautović

5 goals

- (Bosnia and Herzegovina national football team) Edin Džeko

4 goals

- (Austria national football team) Michael Gregoritsch

3 goals

- (Austria national football team) Marcel Sabitzer
- (Cyprus national football team) Ioannis Pittas

2 goals

- (Austria national football team) Konrad Laimer
- (Austria national football team) Stefan Posch
- (Bosnia and Herzegovina national football team) Haris Tabaković
- (Cyprus national football team) Andronikos Kakoullis
- (Cyprus national football team) Loizos Loizou
- (Romania national football team) Denis Drăguș
- (Romania national football team) Ianis Hagi
- (Romania national football team) Dennis Man
- (Romania national football team) Florin Tănase

1 goal

- (Austria national football team) Christoph Baumgartner
- (Austria national football team) Romano Schmid
- (Austria national football team) Nikolaus Wurmbrand
- (Bosnia and Herzegovina national football team) Kerim Alajbegović
- (Bosnia and Herzegovina national football team) Esmir Bajraktarević
- (Bosnia and Herzegovina national football team) Samed Baždar
- (Bosnia and Herzegovina national football team) Ermedin Demirović
- (Bosnia and Herzegovina national football team) Armin Gigović
- (Bosnia and Herzegovina national football team) Haris Hajradinović
- (Bosnia and Herzegovina national football team) Nikola Katić
- (Bosnia and Herzegovina national football team) Nihad Mujakić
- (Bosnia and Herzegovina national football team) Benjamin Tahirović
- (Cyprus national football team) Stelios Andreou
- (Cyprus national football team) Charalampos Charalampous
- (Cyprus national football team) Grigoris Kastanos
- (Cyprus national football team) Konstantinos Laifis
- (Romania national football team) Denis Alibec
- (Romania national football team) Ștefan Baiaram
- (Romania national football team) Daniel Bîrligea
- (Romania national football team) Virgil Ghiță
- (Romania national football team) Răzvan Marin
- (Romania national football team) Louis Munteanu
- (Romania national football team) Mihai Popescu
- (Romania national football team) Andrei Rațiu
- (San Marino national football team) Nicolas Giacopetti
- (San Marino national football team) Samuele Zannoni

1 own goal

- (Cyprus national football team) Neofytos Michail (against Bosnia and Herzegovina)
- (San Marino national football team) Michele Cevoli (against Romania)
- (San Marino national football team) Dante Rossi (against Romania)
- (San Marino national football team) Giacomo Valentini (against Romania)

== Discipline ==
A player or team official was automatically suspended for the next match for the following offences:

- Receiving a red card (red card suspensions could be extended for serious offences)
- Receiving two yellow cards in two different matches (yellow card suspensions were carried forward to the play-offs, but not the finals or any other future international matches)

The following suspensions were served during the qualifying matches:

| Team | Player | Offence(s) | Suspended for match(es) |
|---|---|---|---|
| Austria | Gernot Trauner | (red card) vs Serbia in 2024–25 UEFA Nations League (23 March 2025) | vs Romania (7 June 2025) |
| Austria | Stefan Posch | (yellow card) vs San Marino (10 June 2025); (yellow card) vs Cyprus (6 September 2025) | vs Bosnia and Herzegovina (9 September 2025) |
| Austria | Patrick Wimmer | (yellow card) (yellow-red card) vs Bosnia and Herzegovina (9 September 2025) | vs San Marino (9 October 2025) |
| Austria | Phillipp Mwene | (yellow card) vs Bosnia and Herzegovina (9 September 2025); (yellow card) vs Romania (12 October 2025) | vs Cyprus (15 November 2025) |
| Austria | David Alaba | (yellow card) vs San Marino (9 October 2025); (yellow card) vs Romania (12 October 2025) | vs Cyprus (15 November 2025) |
| Bosnia and Herzegovina | Ivan Šunjić | (yellow card) vs Cyprus (24 March 2025); (yellow card) vs Cyprus (9 October 2025) | vs Romania (15 November 2025) |
| Bosnia and Herzegovina | Nihad Mujakić | (yellow card) vs Austria (9 September 2025); (yellow card) vs Cyprus (9 October 2025) | vs Romania (15 November 2025) |
| Bosnia and Herzegovina | Amar Dedić | (yellow card) vs San Marino (7 June 2025); (yellow card) vs Romania (15 November 2025) | vs Austria (18 November 2025) |
| Bosnia and Herzegovina | Dženis Burnić | (yellow card) vs San Marino (6 September 2025); (yellow card) vs Romania (15 November 2025) | vs Austria (18 November 2025) |
| Bosnia and Herzegovina | Nikola Katić | (yellow card) vs Austria (9 September 2025); (yellow card) vs Romania (15 November 2025) | vs Austria (18 November 2025) |
| Cyprus | Konstantinos Laifis | (yellow card) (yellow-red card) vs Romania in 2024–25 UEFA Nations League (18 November 2024) | vs San Marino (21 March 2025) |
| Cyprus | Konstantinos Laifis | (yellow card) vs Bosnia and Herzegovina (24 March 2025); (yellow card) vs San Marino (12 October 2025) | vs Austria (15 November 2025) |
| Cyprus | Ioannis Pittas | (yellow card) (yellow-red card) vs Bosnia and Herzegovina (24 March 2025) | vs Romania (10 June 2025) |
| Cyprus | Ioannis Pittas | (yellow card) vs Romania (9 September 2025); (yellow card) vs San Marino (12 October 2025) | vs Austria (15 November 2025) |
| Cyprus | Kostas Pileas | (yellow card) vs Austria (6 September 2025); (yellow card) vs San Marino (12 October 2025) | vs Austria (15 November 2025) |
| Romania | Nicolae Stanciu | (yellow card) vs Bosnia and Herzegovina (21 March 2025); (yellow card) vs Austria (7 June 2025) | vs Cyprus (10 June 2025) |
| Romania | Nicușor Bancu | (yellow card) vs Bosnia and Herzegovina (21 March 2025); (yellow card) vs Cyprus (9 September 2025) | vs Austria (12 October 2025) |
| Romania | Andrei Burcă | (yellow card) vs Cyprus (9 September 2025); (yellow card) vs Austria (12 October 2025) | vs Bosnia and Herzegovina (15 November 2025) |
| Romania | Denis Drăguș | (red card) vs Bosnia and Herzegovina (15 November 2025) | vs San Marino (18 November 2025); Last match of suspension to be served in play-offs |
| San Marino | Alessandro Golinucci | (red card) vs Bosnia and Herzegovina (6 September 2025) | vs Austria (9 October 2025) |
| San Marino | Lorenzo Capicchioni | (yellow card) vs Bosnia and Herzegovina (6 September 2025); (yellow card) vs Cyprus (12 October 2025) | vs Romania (18 November 2025) |
