= Benjamin Tahirović =

Bosnian footballer (born 2003)

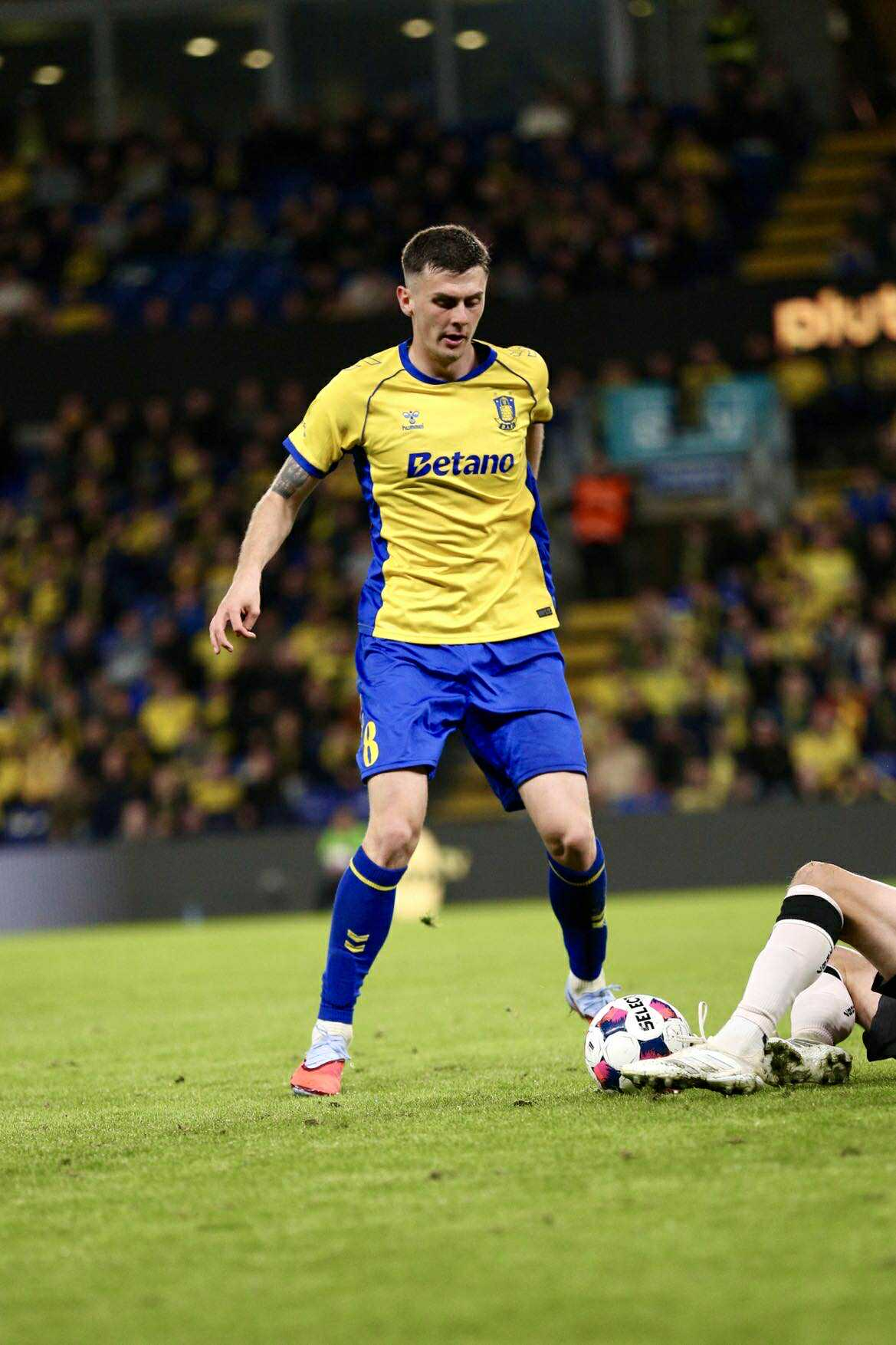
- Tahirović playing for Brøndby in 2025

Personal information
- Date of birth: 3 March 2003 (age 23)
- Place of birth: Spånga, Sweden
- Height: 1.90 m (6 ft 3 in)
- Position: Defensive midfielder

Team information
- Current team: Genk (on loan from Brøndby)
- Number: 4

Youth career
- 2012–2017: AIK
- 2017–2020: FC Djursholm

Senior career*
Years	Team	Apps	(Gls)
2020–2021	Vasalund IF	27	(0)
2021–2023	Roma	11	(0)
2023–2025	Ajax	27	(2)
2025–	Brøndby	40	(1)
2026–	→ Genk (loan)	8	(0)

International career^{‡}
2023–	Bosnia and Herzegovina	37	(3)
- * Club domestic league appearances and goals as of 21 November 2026 ‡ National team caps and goals as of 17 November 2026

Benjamin Tahirović (pronounced [běɲamin tâːxiroʋitɕ]; born 3 March 2003) is a professional footballer who plays as a defensive midfielder for Belgian Pro League club Genk, on loan from Brøndby. Born in Sweden, he plays for the Bosnia and Herzegovina national team.

Tahirović started his professional career at Vasalund IF, before joining Roma in 2021. Two years later, he moved to Ajax. In 2025, he was transferred to Brøndby, who loaned him to Genk in 2026.

Tahirović made his senior international debut for Bosnia and Herzegovina in 2023, earning over 30 caps since. He represented the nation at the 2026 FIFA World Cup.

== Club career ==
=== Early career ===
Tahirović started playing football at his hometown club AIK, before joining the youth setup of FC Djursholm in 2017. In 2020, he switched to Vasalund IF. He made his professional debut against IFK Berga on 14 June 2020 at the age of 17.

=== Roma ===
In February 2021, Tahirović was transferred to Italian side Roma for an undisclosed fee. He made his official debut for the team against Torino on 13 November 2022.

=== Ajax ===
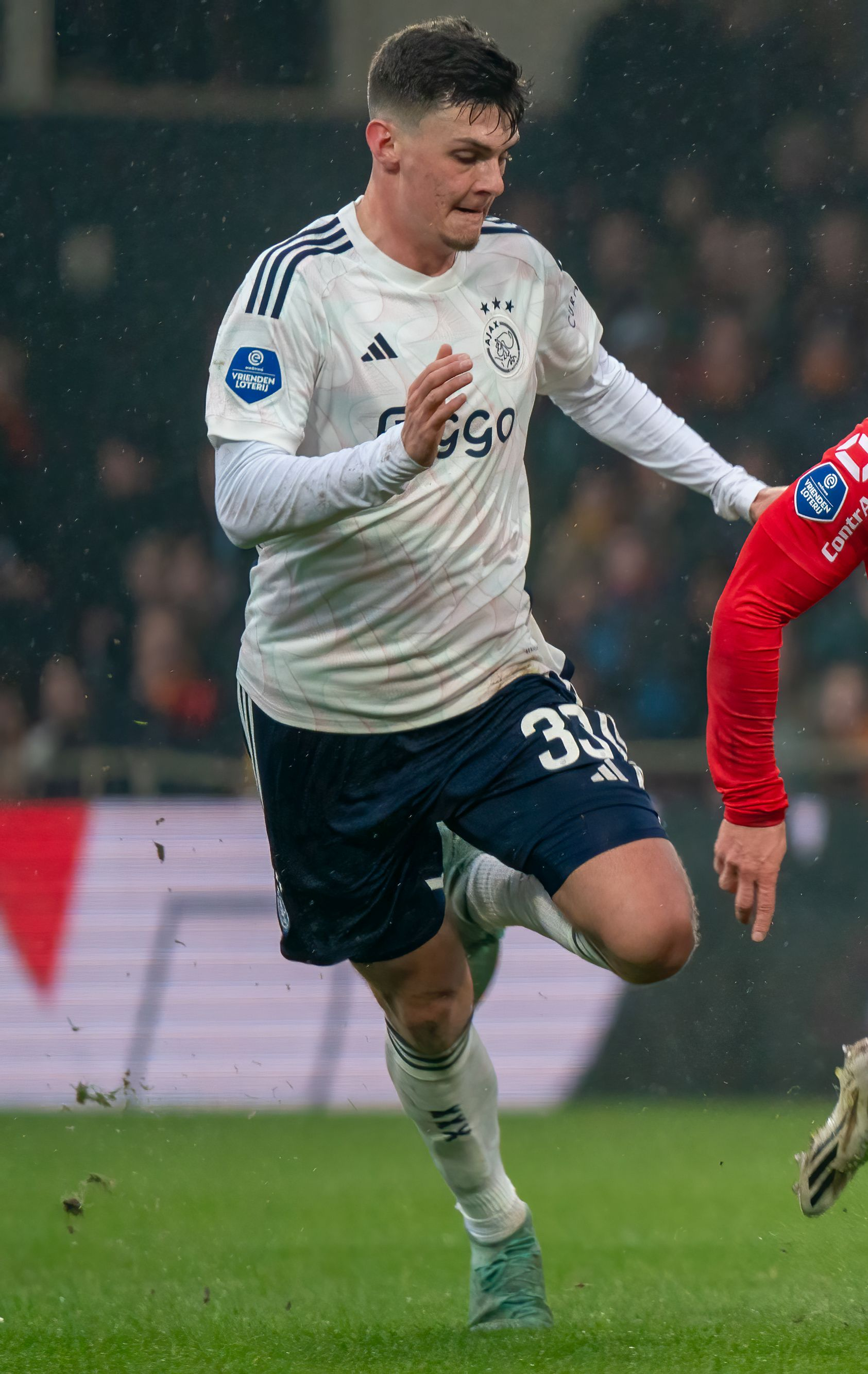
Tahirović with Ajax in 2024

In June 2023, Tahirović signed a five-year deal with Dutch outfit Ajax. He made his competitive debut for the squad on 12 August against Heracles. On 12 November, he scored his first professional goal against Almere City.

=== Brøndby ===
In February 2025, Tahirović moved to Danish team Brøndby on a contract until June 2028. He debuted officially for the side against Viborg FF on 14 February. On 27 October, he scored his first goal for Brøndby in a triumph over Odense.

In August 2026, he was sent on a season-long loan to Belgian outfit Genk.

== International career ==
In March 2023, Tahirović received his first senior call up to Bosnia and Herzegovina, for UEFA Euro 2024 qualifiers against Iceland and Slovakia. He debuted against the former on 23 March.

On 6 September 2025, in a 2026 FIFA World Cup qualifier against San Marino, he scored his first senior international goal.

In June 2026, Tahirović was named in Bosnia and Herzegovina's squad for the 2026 FIFA World Cup. He made his tournament debut in the opening group game against Canada on 12 June.

== Personal life ==
Tahirović is a practising Muslim; together with international teammates Ermedin Demirović, Jusuf Gazibegović, Haris Tabaković, Nihad Mujakić, Haris Hajradinović, Dženis Burnić, Sead Kolašinac, Enver Kulašin, Nail Omerović, Osman Hadžikić and Ermin Bičakčić he visited a mosque in Ilidža during the national team's concentration.

== Career statistics ==
=== Club ===
As of match played 21 November 2026

Appearances and goals by club, season and competition
Club	Season	League			National cup (Note: Includes Svenska Cupen, Coppa Italia, KNVB Cup, Danish Cup, Belgian Cup)		Continental		Total	
Club	Season	Division	Apps	Goals	Apps	Goals	Apps	Goals	Apps	Goals
Vasalund IF	2020	Ettan Norra	27	0	1	0	–		28	0
Roma	2022–23	Serie A	11	0	2	0	0	0	13	0
Ajax	2023–24	Eredivisie	26	2	1	0	10 (Note: Eight appearances in UEFA Europa League; two appearances in UEFA Conference League)	0	37	2
Ajax	2024–25	Eredivisie	1	0	0	0	1 (Note: Appearance in UEFA Europa League)	0	2	0
Ajax	Total		27	2	1	0	11	0	39	2
Brøndby	2024–25	Danish Superliga	15	0	2	0	–		17	0
Brøndby	2025–26	Danish Superliga	25	1	1	0	6 (Note: Appearances in UEFA Conference League)	0	32	1
Brøndby	Total		40	1	3	0	6	0	49	1
Genk (loan)	2026–27	Belgian Pro League	8	0	1	0	–		9	0
Career total			113	3	8	0	17	0	138	3

=== International ===
As of match played 17 November 2026

Appearances and goals by national team and year
National team	Year	Apps	Goals
Bosnia and Herzegovina
Bosnia and Herzegovina	2023	6	0
Bosnia and Herzegovina	2024	8	0
Bosnia and Herzegovina	2025	10	2
Bosnia and Herzegovina	2026	13	1
Total		37	3

Scores and results list Bosnia and Herzegovina's goal tally first, score column indicates score after each Tahirović goal.

List of international goals scored by Benjamin Tahirović
No.	Date	Venue	Cap	Opponent	Score	Result	Competition
1	6 September 2025	San Marino Stadium, Serravalle, San Marino	19	San Marino	1–0	6–0	2026 FIFA World Cup qualification
2	12 October 2025	National Stadium, Ta' Qali, Malta	22	Malta	3–1	4–1	Friendly
3	17 November 2026	Bilino Polje, Zenica, Bosnia and Herzegovina	37	Romania	1–1	2–1	2026–27 UEFA Nations League B

== Honours ==
Vasalund IF

- Ettan Norra: 2020
