= Romania national football team results (2000–2019) =

This is a list of the Romania national football team results from 2000 to 2019:

== 2000 ==
| 2 February 2000 2000 Cyprus Tournament | Latvia | 0–2 | Romania | Paphos, Cyprus |
| | | Report | 18' Roșu; 69' Niculae | Stadium: Pafiako Stadium; Attendance: 300; Referee: (Greece) Mihalis Karaiskakis |

| 4 February 2000 2000 Cyprus Tournament | Georgia | 1–1 (a.e.t.) (2–4 p) | Romania | Larnaca, Cyprus |
| | Ketsbaia 41' | Report; Report 2 | 81' Hîldan | Stadium: Antonis Papadopoulos Stadium; Attendance: 200; Referee: (Cyprus) Kostas Kapitanis |
| | Penalties |
| | Nemsadze (penalty missed); Ketsbaia (penalty scored); Dzhanashia (penalty missed); Silagadze (penalty scored) | | (penalty scored) Bătrânu; (penalty scored) Dumitru; (penalty scored) Petre; (penalty missed) Niculescu; (penalty scored) Mara |

| 6 February 2000 2000 Cyprus Tournament | Cyprus | 3–2 (a.e.t.) | Romania | Strovolos, Cyprus |
| | Okkas 5'; Poyiatzis 69'; Marios Agathokleous 99' | Report | 16' Mara; 55' Stoica | Stadium: G.S.P. [Sport Club Pancyprian] Attendance: 4,000; Referee: (Cyprus) Yiannakis Kyprianides |

| 29 March 2000 Friendly | Greece | 2–0 | Romania | Marousi, Greece |
| | Amanatidis 59'; Houtos 88' | Report | | Stadium: Olympic Stadium (Spyridon Louis); Attendance: 2,569; Referee: (France) Alain Sars |

| 26 April 2000 Friendly | Romania | 2–0 | Cyprus | Constanța, Romania |
| | Mutu 58'; Ganea 80' (pen.) | Report | | Stadium: Stadionul Gheorghe Hagi; Attendance: 20,000; Referee: (Romania) Marcel Lică |

| 27 May 2000 Friendly | Netherlands | 2–1 | Romania | Amsterdam, Netherlands |
| | Overmars 43'; Kluivert 68' | Report | 70' Moldovan | Stadium: Amsterdam Arena; Attendance: 43,500; Referee: (Norway) Terje Hauge |

| 3 June 2000 Friendly | Romania | 2–1 | Greece | Bucharest, Romania |
| | Ciobotariu 8'; Petre 78' | Report | 83' Lyberopoulos | Stadium: Stadionul Steaua; Attendance: 12,000; Referee: (Romania) Salomir Mircea |

| 12 June 2000 Euro 2000 | Germany | 1–1 | Romania | Liège, Belgium |
| | Scholl 28' | Report | 5' Moldovan | Stadium: Stade Maurice Dufrasne; Attendance: 30,000; Referee: (Denmark) Kim Milton Nielsen |

| 17 June 2000 Euro 2000 | Portugal | 1–0 | Romania | Arnhem, Netherlands |
| | Costinha 90' | Report | | Stadium: GelreDome; Attendance: 18,200; Referee: (France) Gilles Veissière |

| 20 June 2000 Euro 2000 | England | 2–3 | Romania | Charleroi, Belgium |
| | Shearer 41' (pen.); Owen 45' | Report | 22' Chivu; 48' Munteanu; 89' (pen.) Ganea | Stadium: Stade du Pays de Charleroi; Attendance: 27,000; Referee: (Switzerland) Urs Meier |

| 24 June 2000 Euro 2000 | Italy | 2–0 | Romania | Brussels, Belgium |
| | Totti 33'; Inzaghi 43' | Report | | Stadium: King Baudouin Stadium; Attendance: 30,000; Referee: (Portugal) Vítor Melo Pereira |

| 16 August 2000 Friendly | Romania | 1–1 | Poland | Bucharest, Romania |
| | Ilie 21' | Report | 79' Olisadebe | Stadium: Stadionul Cotroceni; Attendance: 5,000; Referee: (Bulgaria) Atanas Uzunov |

| 3 September 2000 2002 World Cup Q | Romania | 1–0 | Lithuania | Bucharest, Romania |
| | Ganea 89' | Report | | Stadium: Stadionul Steaua; Attendance: 3,000; Referee: (Sweden) Morgan Norman |

| 7 October 2000 2002 World Cup Q | Italy | 3–0 | Romania | Milan, Italy |
| | Inzaghi 12'; Delvecchio 16'; Totti 41' | Report | | Stadium: Stadio Giuseppe Meazza; Attendance: 54,297; Referee: (Netherlands) Jan Wegereef |

| 15 November 2000 Friendly | Romania | 2–1 | FR Yugoslavia | Bucharest, Romania |
| | Șerban 3'; Bărcăuan 90' | Report | 87' Mihajlović | Stadium: Stadionul Steaua; Attendance: 20,000; Referee: (Turkey) Mustafa Çulcu |

| 5 December 2000 Friendly | Algeria | 3–2 | Romania | Annaba, Algeria |
| | Dziri 22'; Meftah 26'; Djabelkheir 36' | Report | 1', 45' Niculae | Stadium: Stade 19 Mai 1956; Attendance: 20,000; Referee: (Algeria) Mohamed Benaissa |

| 8 December 2000 Friendly | Algeria | 2–3 | Romania | Annaba, Algeria |
| | Djabelkheir 19'; Kherkhache 72' | Report | 10' Bărcăuan; 18', 70' Niculae | Stadium: Stade 19 Mai 1956; Attendance: 15,000; Referee: (Algeria) Salim Ouassissi |

== 2001 ==
| 26 February 2001 Cyprus Tournament | Romania | 1–0 | Ukraine | Strovolos, Cyprus |
| | Ciobotariu 90+9' | Report | | Stadium: G.S.P. [Sport Club Pancyprian] Stadium; Attendance: 60; Referee: (Cyprus) Loizos Loizou |

| 28 February 2001 Cyprus Tournament | Lithuania | 0–3 | Romania | Strovolos, Cyprus |
| | | Report | 12', 40' Ganea; 57' Codrea | Stadium: G.S.P. [Sport Club Pancyprian] Stadium; Attendance: 24,000; Referee: (Cyprus) Kostas Kapitanis |

| 24 March 2001 2002 World Cup Q | Romania | 0–2 | Italy | Bucharest, Romania |
| | | Report | 29', 33' Inzaghi | Stadium: Stadionul Steaua; Attendance: 24,000; Referee: (Germany) Herbert Fandel |

| 28 March 2001 2002 World Cup Q | Georgia | 0–2 | Romania | Tbilisi, Georgia |
| | | Report | 68' Munteanu; 79' Niculae | Stadium: Stadionul Boris Paiciadze; Attendance: 27,000; Referee: (Norway) Rune Pedersen |

| 25 April 2001 Friendly | Romania | 0–0 | Slovakia | Ploiești, Romania |
| | | Report | | Stadium: Stadionul Astra; Attendance: 2,000; Referee: (Moldova) Ghenadie Orlic |

| 2 June 2001 2002 World Cup Q | Romania | 2–0 | Hungary | Bucharest, Romania |
| | Niculae 5', 24' | Report | | Stadium: Stadionul Steaua; Attendance: 20,256; Referee: (France) Éric Poulat |

| 6 June 2001 2002 World Cup Q | Lithuania | 1–2 | Romania | Kaunas, Lithuania |
| | Fomenka 87' | Report | 31' Ilie; 49' Moldovan | Stadium: Steponas Darius ir Stasys Girėnas Stadionas; Attendance: 3,000; Referee: (Slovakia) Anton Stredák |

| 15 August 2001 Friendly | Slovenia | 2–2 | Romania | Ljubljana, Slovenia |
| | Ačimovič 55'; Zahovič 75' | Report | 14' Niculae; 66' Moldovan | Stadium: Centralni Stadion za Bežigradom; Attendance: 6,000; Referee: (Bosnia and Herzegovina) Sead Kulović |

| 5 September 2001 2002 World Cup Q | Hungary | 0–2 | Romania | Budapest, Hungary |
| | | Report | 11' Ilie; 27' Niculae | Stadium: Népstadion; Attendance: 6,000; Referee: (Scotland) Hugh Dallas |

| 6 October 2001 2002 World Cup Q | Romania | 1–1 | Georgia | Bucharest, Romania |
| | Popescu 88' | Report | 54' Iashvili | Stadium: Stadionul Steaua; Attendance: 24,000; Referee: (Slovakia) Ľuboš Micheľ |

| 10 November 2001 2002 World Cup Q | Slovenia | 2–1 | Romania | Ljubljana, Slovenia |
| | Ačimovič 41'; Osterc 68' | Report | 26' Niculae | Stadium: Centralni Stadion za Bežigradom; Attendance: 9,000; Referee: (Denmark) Kim Milton Nielsen |

| 14 November 2001 2002 World Cup Q | Romania | 1–1 (2–3 agg.) | Slovenia | Bucharest, Romania |
| | Contra 65' | Report | 55' Rudonja | Stadium: Stadionul Steaua; Attendance: 30,000; Referee: (Germany) Hellmut Krug |

== 2002 ==
| 13 February 2002 Friendly | France | 2–1 | Romania | Paris, France |
| | Vieira 1'; Petit 26' | Report | 88' Ganea | Stadium: Stade de France; Attendance: 77,144; Referee: (Netherlands) Dick van Egmond |

| 27 March 2002 Friendly | Romania | 4–1 | Ukraine | Constanța, Romania |
| | Munteanu 12'; Pancu 17', 31'; Ganea 37' | Report | 47' Shyshchenko | Stadium: Stadionul Gheorghe Hagi; Attendance: 7,000; Referee: (Greece) Giorgos Douros |

| 17 April 2002 Friendly | Poland | 1–2 | Romania | Bydgoszcz, Poland |
| | Hajto 85' | Report | 31' Ganea; 36' Mutu | Stadium: Stadion Zawiszy; Attendance: 18,000; Referee: (Russia) Iuri Baskakov |

| 21 August 2002 Friendly | Romania | 0–1 | Greece | Constanța, Romania |
| | | Report | 17' Giannakopoulos | Stadium: Stadionul Gheorghe Hagi; Attendance: 15,000; Referee: (Turkey) Metin Tokat |

| 7 September 2002 Euro 2004 Q | Bosnia and Herzegovina | 0–3 | Romania | Sarajevo, Bosnia and Herzegovina |
| | | Report | 7' Chivu; 9' Munteanu; 27' Ganea | Stadium: Stadion Koševo; Attendance: 4,000; Referee: (Portugal) Lucílio Batista |

| 12 October 2002 Euro 2004 Q | Romania | 0–1 | Norway | Bucharest, Romania |
| | | Report | 83' Iversen | Stadium: Stadionul Steaua; Attendance: 21,000; Referee: (Russia) Valentin Ivanov |

| 16 October 2002 Euro 2004 Q | Luxembourg | 0–7 | Romania | Luxembourg City, Luxembourg |
| | | Report | 1', 5' Moldovan; 24' Rădoi; 45', 47', 85' Contra; 80' Ghioane | Stadium: Stade Josy Barthel; Attendance: 2,056; Referee: (Latvia) Romāns Lajuks |

| 20 November 2002 Friendly | Romania | 0–1 | Croatia | Timișoara, Romania |
| | | Report | 47' Marić | Stadium: Stadionul Dan Păltinișanu; Attendance: 36,000; Referee: (Hungary) János Megyebíró |

== 2003 ==
| 12 February 2003 Cyprus Tournament | Romania | 2–1 | Slovakia | Larnaca, Cyprus |
| | Munteanu 38'; Ganea 40' | Report | 6' Vittek | Stadium: Neo Gymnastikos Syllogos Zenon (G.S.Z.); Attendance: 150; Referee: (Cyprus) Tasos Papaioannou |

| 13 February 2003 Cyprus Tournament | Russia | 4–2 | Romania | Limassol, Cyprus |
| | Șoavă 30' (o.g.); Karyaka 34'; Arshavin 41'; Gusev 59' (pen.) | Report | Tamaș 12'; Grigorie 70' (pen.) | Stadium: Tsirio Stadium |

| 29 March 2003 Euro 2004 Q | Romania | 2–5 | Denmark | Bucharest, Romania |
| | Mutu 5'; Munteanu 47' | Report | 9', 90' Rommedahl; 53' Gravesen; 71' Tomasson; 74' (o.g.) Contra | Stadium: Stadionul Național; Attendance: 55,000; Referee: (Spain) Manuel Enrique Mejuto González |

| 30 April 2003 Friendly | Lithuania | 0–1 | Romania | Kaunas, Lithuania |
| | | Report | 63' Bratu | Stadium: Steponas Darius ir Stasys Girėnas Stadionas; Attendance: 3,000; Referee: (Latvia) Andrejs Sipailo |

| 7 June 2003 Euro 2004 Q | Romania | 2–0 | Bosnia and Herzegovina | Craiova, Romania |
| | Mutu 46'; Ganea 88' | Report | | Stadium: Stadionul Ion Oblemenco; Attendance: 25,000; Referee: (Netherlands) Ruud Bossen |

| 11 June 2003 Euro 2004 Q | Norway | 1–1 | Romania | Oslo, Norway |
| | Solskjær 78' (pen.) | Report | 64' Ganea | Stadium: Ullevaal; Attendance: 24,890; Referee: (Slovakia) Ľuboš Micheľ |

| 20 August 2003 Friendly | Ukraine | 0–2 | Romania | Donetsk, Ukraine |
| | | Report | 28', 58' Mutu | Stadium: Stadionul Șahtior; Attendance: 25,000; Referee: (Russia) Igor Egorov |

| 6 September 2003 Euro 2004 Q | Romania | 4–0 | Luxembourg | Ploiești, Romania |
| | Mutu 38'; Pancu 42'; Ganea 43'; Bratu 78' | Report | | Stadium: Stadionul Astra; Attendance: 4,000; Referee: (Israel) Alon Yefet |

| 10 September 2003 Euro 2004 Q | Denmark | 2–2 | Romania | Copenhagen, Denmark |
| | Tomasson 35' (pen.); Laursen 90' | Report | 61' Mutu; 72' Pancu | Stadium: Parken; Attendance: 42,049; Referee: (Switzerland) Urs Meier |

| 11 October 2003 Friendly | Romania | 1–1 | Japan | Bucharest, Romania |
| | Mutu 16' | Report; Report 2 | 58' Yanagisawa | Stadium: Stadionul Dinamo; Attendance: 9,000; Referee: (Spain) Fernando Carmona Mendez |

| 16 November 2003 Friendly | Italy | 1–0 | Romania | Ancona, Italy |
| | Di Vaio 58' | Report | | Stadium: Stadio Del Conero; Attendance: 11,700; Referee: (Germany) Wolfgang Stark |

== 2004 ==
| 18 February 2004 Cyprus Tournament | Georgia | 0–3 | Romania | Larnaca, Cyprus |
| | | Report | 30', 69' Mutu; 87' Cernat | Stadium: Neo Gymnastikos Syllogos Zenon (G.S.Z.) Stadium; Attendance: 300; Referee: (Latvia) Romāns Lajuks |

| 31 March 2004 Friendly | Scotland | 1–2 | Romania | Glasgow, Scotland |
| | McFadden 57' | Report | 37' Chivu; 52' Pancu | Stadium: Hampden Park; Attendance: 20,433; Referee: (Finland) Jouni Hyytiä |

| 28 April 2004 Friendly | Romania | 5–1 | Germany | Bucharest, Romania |
| | Pleșan 21'; Raț 23'; Dănciulescu 35', 43'; Caramarin 85' | Report | 88' Lahm | Stadium: Stadionul Giulești; Attendance: 12,000; Referee: (Italy) Roberto Rosetti |

| 27 May 2004 Friendly | Republic of Ireland | 1–0 | Romania | Dublin, Republic of Ireland |
| | Holland 84' | Report | | Stadium: Lansdowne Road; Attendance: 42,356; Referee: (Czech Republic) Jaroslav Jara |

| 18 August 2004 2006 WCQ | Romania | 2–1 | Finland | Bucharest, Romania |
| | Mutu 50'; Petre 89' | Report | 90' (pen.) Eremenko | Stadium: Stadionul Giulești; Attendance: 17,500; Referee: (Poland) Grzegorz Gilewski |

| 4 September 2004 2006 WCQ | Romania | 2–1 | Macedonia | Craiova, Romania |
| | Pancu 15'; Mutu 86' | Report | 73' Vasoski | Stadium: Stadionul Ion Oblemenco; Attendance: 17,000; Referee: (Austria) Konrad Plautz |

| 8 September 2004 2006 WCQ | Andorra | 1–5 | Romania | Andorra La Vella, Andorra |
| | Pujol 27' (pen.) | Report | 2' Cernat; 5', 82' Pancu; 16', 70' Niculae | Stadium: Estadi Comunal d'Andorra la Vella; Attendance: 600; Referee: (Germany) Knut Kircher |

| 9 October 2004 2006 WCQ | Czech Republic | 1–0 | Romania | Prague, Czech Republic |
| | Koller 35' (pen.) | Report | | Stadium: Toyota Arena; Attendance: 16,028; Referee: (Italy) Roberto Rosetti |

| 17 November 2004 2006 WCQ | Armenia | 1–1 | Romania | Yerevan, Armenia |
| | Dokhoyan 62' | Report | 28' Marica | Stadium: Republican Vazgen Sargsyan Stadium; Attendance: 2,500; Referee: (Belgium) Frank De Bleeckere |

== 2005 ==
| 9 February 2005 Friendly | Romania | 2–2 | Slovakia | Larnaca, Cyprus |
| | Pancu 38'; Oprița 89' | Report; Report 2 | 12' Vittek; 44' Karhan | Stadium: Neo Gymnastikos Syllogos Zenon (G.S.Z.) Stadium; Attendance: 500; Referee: (Cyprus) Kostas Kapitanis |

| 26 March 2005 2006 WCQ | Romania | 0–2 | Netherlands | Bucharest, Romania |
| | | Report; Report 2 | 1' Cocu; 84' Babel | Stadium: Stadionul Giulești; Attendance: 19,000; Referee: (Spain) Luis Medina Cantalejo |

| 30 March 2005 2006 WCQ | Macedonia | 1–2 | Romania | Skopje, Republic of Macedonia |
| | Maznov 31' | Report; Report 2 | 18', 58' Mitea | Stadium: Gradski Stadion; Attendance: 10,000; Referee: (Netherlands) Tom Ovrebo |

| 4 June 2005 2006 WCQ | Netherlands | 2–0 | Romania | Rotterdam, Netherlands |
| | Robben 26'; Kuyt 47' | Report; Report 2 | | Stadium: De Kuip; Attendance: 50,000; Referee: (Italy) Massimo De Santis |

| 8 June 2005 2006 WCQ | Romania | 3–0 | Armenia | Constanța, Romania |
| | Petre 28'; Bucur 38', 78' | Report; Report 2 | | Stadium: Stadionul Gheorghe Hagi; Attendance: 5,146; Referee: (Greece) Athanasios Briakos |

| 17 August 2005 2006 WCQ | Romania | 2–0 | Andorra | Constanța, Romania |
| | Mutu 29', 41' | Report; Report 2 | | Stadium: Stadionul Gheorghe Hagi; Attendance: 12,000; Referee: (Israel) Haim Yaacov |

| 2 September 2005 2006 WCQ | Romania | 2–0 | Czech Republic | Constanța, Romania |
| | Mutu 27', 58' | Report; Report 2 | | Stadium: Stadionul Gheorghe Hagi; Attendance: 16,000; Referee: (Norway) Terje Hauge |

| 8 October 2005 2006 WCQ | Finland | 0–1 | Romania | Helsinki, Finland |
| | | Report; Report 2 | 41' Mutu | Stadium: Helsinki Olympic Stadium; Attendance: 10,117; Referee: (France) Anton Genov |

| 12 November 2005 Friendly | Romania | 1–2 | Ivory Coast | Le Mans, France |
| | Iencsi 52' | Report; Report 2 | 48' Koné; 90+1' Koné | Stadium: Stade Omnisports Léon Bollée; Attendance: 5,377; Referee: (France) Fredy Fautrel |

| 16 November 2005 Friendly | Romania | 3–0 | Nigeria | Bucharest, Romania |
| | Niculae 17'; Petre 49'; Roșu 89' | Report; Report 2 | | Stadium: Stadionul Steaua; Attendance: 500; Referee: (Moldova) Viaceslav Banari |

== 2006 ==
| 28 February 2006 Cyprus Tournament | Romania | 2–0 | Armenia | Strovolos, Cyprus |
| | Maftei 72'; Cociș 86' | Report; Report 2 | | Stadium: G.S.P. [Sport Club Pancyprian] Stadium; Attendance: 1,000; Referee: (Greece) Ioannis Tsahilidis |

| 1 March 2006 Cyprus Tournament | Romania | 2–0 | Slovenia | Larnaca, Cyprus |
| | Mazilu 22'; Pečnik 53' (o.g.) | Report; Report 2 | | Stadium: Neo Gymnastikos Syllogos Zenon (G.S.Z.) Stadium; Attendance: 300; Referee: (Belarus) Valery Vyalychka |

| 24 May 2006 Friendly | Romania | 0–2 | Uruguay | Los Angeles, United States |
| | | Report; Report 2 | 46', 59' Vargas | Stadium: Memorial Coliseum; Attendance: 10,000; Referee: (United States) Kevin Stott |

| 26 May 2006 Friendly | Romania | 2–0 | Northern Ireland | Chicago, United States |
| | Buga 7'; Niculae 11' | Report; Report 2 | | Stadium: Soldier Field; Attendance: 15,000; Referee: (United States) Michael Kennedy |

| 27 May 2006 Friendly | Romania | 0–0 | Colombia | Chicago, United States |
| | | Report; Report 2 | | Stadium: Soldier Field; Attendance: 15,000; Referee: (United States) Brian Hall |

| 16 August 2006 Friendly | Romania | 2–0 | Cyprus | Constanța, Romania |
| | Dică 4'; Mutu 29' | Report; Report 2 | | Stadium: Stadionul Farul; Attendance: 10,000; Referee: (Romania) Sorin Corpodean |

| 2 September 2006 Euro 2008 Q | Romania | 2–2 | Bulgaria | Constanța, Romania |
| | Roșu 41'; Marica 55' | Report; Report 2 | 82', 83' Petrov | Stadium: Stadionul Farul; Attendance: 15,000; Referee: (Italy) Stefano Farina |

| 6 September 2006 Euro 2008 Q | Albania | 0–2 | Romania | Tirana, Albania |
| | | Report; Report 2 | 65' Dică; 75' (pen.) Mutu | Stadium: Stadiumi Kombetar Qemal Stafa; Attendance: 12,000; Referee: (Scotland) Stuart Dougal |

| 7 October 2006 Euro 2008 Q | Romania | 3–1 | Belarus | Bucharest, Romania |
| | Mutu 8'; Marica 10'; Goian 76' | Report; Report 2 | 20' Kornilenko | Stadium: Stadionul Steaua; Attendance: 12,500; Referee: (Spain) Alberto Undiano Mallenco |

| 15 November 2006 Friendly | Spain | 0–1 | Romania | Cádiz, Spain |
| | | Report; Report 2 | 59' Marica | Stadium: Estadio Ramón de Carranza; Attendance: 16,000; Referee: (Italy) Domenico Messina |

== 2007 ==
| 7 February 2007 Friendly | Romania | 2–0 | Moldova | Bucharest, Romania |
| | Mazilu 75'; Mutu 89' | Report; Report 2 | | Stadium: Stadionul Național; Attendance: 8,000; Referee: (Romania) Alexandru Deaconu |

| 24 March 2007 Euro 2008 Q | Netherlands | 0–0 | Romania | Rotterdam, Netherlands |
| 21:45 | | Report; Report 2 | | Stadium: De Kuip; Attendance: 49,000; Referee: (Germany) Markus Merk |

| 28 March 2007 Euro 2008 Q | Romania | 3–0 | Luxembourg | Piatra Neamț, Romania |
| | Mutu 25'; Contra 50'; Marica 90' | Report; Report 2 | | Stadium: Stadionul Ceahlăul; Attendance: 9,012; Referee: (Latvia) Romāns Lajuks |

| 2 June 2007 Euro 2008 Q | Slovenia | 1–2 | Romania | Celje, Slovenia |
| 21:45 | Vršič 90' | Report; Report 2 | 50' Tamaș; 69' Nicoliță | Stadium: Arena Petrol; Attendance: 7,000; Referee: (Scotland) Stuart Dougal |

| 6 June 2007 Euro 2008 Q | Romania | 2–0 | Slovenia | Timișoara, Romania |
| | Mutu 41'; Contra 70' | Report; Report 2 | | Stadium: Stadionul Dan Păltinișanu; Attendance: 18,000; Referee: (Israel) Alon Yefet |

| 22 August 2007 Friendly | Romania | 2–0 | Turkey | Bucharest, Romania |
| | Dică 61'; Mutu 70' | Report | | Stadium: Stadionul Național; Attendance: 12,000; Referee: (Germany) Markus Merk |

| 8 September 2007 Euro 2008 Q | Belarus | 1–3 | Romania | Minsk, Belarus |
| 20:15 | Romașcenko 20' | Report | 16', 77' (pen.) Mutu; 42' Dică | Stadium: Dinamo Stadium; Attendance: 19,320; Referee: (Sweden) Peter Fröjdfeldt |

| 12 September 2007 Friendly | Germany | 3–1 | Romania | Köln, Germany |
| 20:15 | Schneider 42'; Odonkor 65'; Podolski 82' | Report; Report 2 | 3' Goian | Stadium: Rhein-Energie Stadion; Attendance: 44,500; Referee: (Italy) Nicola Rizzoli |

| 13 October 2007 Euro 2008 Q | Romania | 1–0 | Netherlands | Constanța, Romania |
| 20:15 | Goian 71' | Report | | Stadium: Stadionul Farul; Attendance: 12,595; Referee: (Greece) K. Vassaras |

| 17 October 2007 Euro 2008 Q | Luxembourg | 0–2 | Romania | Luxembourg, Luxembourg |
| 21:15 | | Report | 42' Petre; 61' Marica | Stadium: Stade Josy Barthel; Attendance: 3,584; Referee: (Germany) F. Brych |

| 17 November 2007 Euro 2008 Q | Bulgaria | 1–0 | Romania | Sofia, Bulgaria |
| 18:00 | Dimitrov 6' | Report | | Stadium: Vasil Levski; Attendance: 6,000; Referee: (Austria) K. Plautz |

| 21 November 2007 Euro 2008 Q | Romania | 6–1 | Albania | Bucharest, Romania |
| 18:00 | Dică 22', 71' (pen.); Tamaș 53'; Niculae 62', 65'; Marica 69' (pen.) | Report | 64' Kapllani | Stadium: Stadionul Național; Attendance: 23,427; Referee: (Croatia) E. Trivkovic |

== 2008 ==
| 6 February 2008 Friendly | Israel | 1–0 | Romania | Tel Aviv, Israel |
| 20:00 | Golan 25' | Report | | Stadium: National Stadium; Attendance: 8,000; Referee: Duarte Gomes (Portugal) |

| 26 May 2008 Friendly | Romania | 3–0 | Russia | Bucharest, Romania |
| 20:00 | Marica 45'; D. Niculae 60'; M. Niculae 75' | Report | | Stadium: Stadionul Steaua; Attendance: 12,000; Referee: Asaf Kenan (Israel) |

| 31 May 2008 Friendly | Romania | 4–0 | Montenegro | Bucharest, Romania |
| 20:45 | Mutu 15'; Dorin Goian 49'; Dică 55' 69' | Report | | Stadium: Stadionul Steaua; Attendance: 7,000; Referee: Alexandru Tudor (Romania) |

| 9 June 2008 Euro 2008 | Romania | 0–0 | France | Zurich, Switzerland |
| 19:00 | | Report | | Stadium: Letzigrund; Attendance: 30,585; Referee: Manuel Mejuto Gonzalez (Spain) |

| 13 June 2008 Euro 2008 | Italy | 1–1 | Romania | Zurich, Switzerland |
| 19:00 | Panucci 56' | Report | 55' Mutu | Stadium: Letzigrund; Attendance: 30,585; Referee: Tom Øvrebø (Norway) |

| 17 June 2008 Euro 2008 | Netherlands | 2–0 | Romania | Bern, Switzerland |
| 21:45 | Huntelaar 54' van Persie 87' | Report | | Stadium: Stade de Suisse; Attendance: 30,777; Referee: Massimo Busacca (Switzerland) |

| 20 August 2008 Friendly | Romania | 1–0 | Latvia | Urziceni, Romania |
| 20:45 | Dică 52' (pen.) | Report | | Stadium: Stadionul Tineretului; Attendance: 7,000; Referee: Tom Øvrebø (Norway) |

| 6 September 2008 World Cup 2010 Q | Romania | 0–3 | Lithuania | Cluj-Napoca, Romania |
| 21:00 | | Report | 31' Stankevičius; 69' Mikoliūnas; 86' Kalonas | Stadium: Stadionul Dr. Constantin Rădulescu; Attendance: 14,000; Referee: Marc Douglas (Rep. of Ireland) |

| 10 September 2008 World Cup 2010 Q | Faroe Islands | 0–1 | Romania | Tórshavn, Faroe Islands |
| 19:30 | | Report | 59' Cociș | Stadium: Tórsvøllur Stadium; Attendance: 805; Referee: Marijo Strahonja (Croatia) |

| 11 October 2008 World Cup 2010 Q | Romania | 2–2 | France | Constanța, Romania |
| 21:40 | Petre 5'; Goian 17' | Report | 37' Ribéry; 69' Gourcuff | Stadium: Stadionul Farul; Attendance: 12,800; Referee: Frank De Bleeckere (Belgium) |

| 19 November 2008 Friendly | Romania | 2–1 | Georgia | Bucharest, Romania |
| 20:30 | Marica 62'; Goian 70' | Report | Martsvaladze 12' | Stadium: Stadionul Dinamo; Attendance: 3,000; Referee: kyros Vassaras (Greece) |

== 2009 ==
| 11 February 2009 Friendly | Romania | 1–2 | Croatia | Bucharest, Romania |
| 20:45 | Marica 21' | Report | 28' Rakitić; 75' Kranjčar | Stadium: Stadionul Steaua; Attendance: 8,000; Referee: Cristian Balaj (Romania) |

| 28 March 2009 World Cup 2010 Q | Romania | 2–3 | Serbia | Constanța, Romania |
| 20:45 | Marica 50'; Stoica 74' | Report | 17' Jovanović; 44' (o.g.) Stoica; 59' Ivanović | Stadium: Stadionul Farul; Attendance: 12,000; Referee: Matteo Trefoloni (Italy) |

| 1 April 2009 World Cup 2010 Q | Austria | 2–1 | Romania | Klagenfurt, Austria |
| 21:30 | Hoffer 25' 43' | Report | 38' Tănase | Stadium: Wörthersee Stadion; Attendance: 23,000; Referee: Craig Thomson (Scotland) |

| 6 June 2009 World Cup 2010 Q | Lithuania | 0–1 | Romania | Marijampolė, Lithuania |
| 21:00 | | Report | 38' Marica | Stadium: Marijampoles stadionas Attendance: 5,850; Referee: Jonas Eriksson (Sweden) |

| 12 August 2009 Friendly | Hungary | 0–1 | Romania | Budapest, Hungary |
| 21:00 | | Report | 42' Ghioane | Stadium: Puskás Ferenc Stadium; Attendance: 9,000; Referee: Vladimir Vnuk (Slovakia) |

| 5 September 2009 World Cup 2010 Q | France | 1–1 | Romania | Paris, France |
| 22:00 | Henry 47' | Report | 55' Escudé (autogol) | Stadium: Stade de France; Attendance: 78,209; Referee: Ivan Bebek (Croatia) |

| 9 September 2009 World Cup 2010 Q | Romania | 1–1 | Austria | Bucharest, Romania |
| 20:45 | Bucur 54' | Report | 82' Schiemer | Stadium: Stadionul Steaua; Attendance: 7,505; Referee: Martin Atkinson (England) |

| 10 October 2009 World Cup 2010 Q | Serbia | 5–0 | Romania | Belgrad, Serbia |
| 21:30 | Žigić 37'; Pantelić 50'; Kuzmanović 78'; Jovanović 87' 90+3' | Report | | Stadium: Stadion Crvena Zvezda; Attendance: 39,839; Referee: Kostas Kapitanis (Cyprus) |

| 14 October 2009 World Cup 2010 Q | Romania | 3–1 | Faroe Islands | Piatra Neamț, Romania |
| 21:00 | Apostol 16'; Bucur 64'; Mazilu 87' | Report | 83' á Bø | Stadium: Stadionul Ceahlăul; Attendance: 13,000; Referee: Aleksandr Gvardis (Russia) |

| 14 November 2009 Friendly | Poland | 0–1 | Romania | Warsaw, Poland |
| 18:00 | | Report | 57' Niculae | Stadium: National Stadium; Attendance: 5,000; Referee: Menashe Masiah (Israel) |

== 2010 ==
| 3 March 2010 Friendly | Romania | 0–2 | Israel | Timișoara, Romania |
| 21:30 | | | 45' Benayoun; 85' Barda | Stadium: Stadionul Dan Păltinișanu; Attendance: 16,000; Referee: Milorad Mažić (Serbia) |

| 29 May 2010 Friendly | Ukraine | 3–2 | Romania | Lviv, Ukraine |
| 20:30 | Aliev 15'; Konoplianka 78'; Chivu 79' (o.g.) | | 54' Tamaș; 65' Niculae | Stadium: Arena Lviv; Attendance: 23,000; Referee: Pavel Královec (Czech Republic) |

| 2 June 2010 Friendly | Romania | 0–1 | Macedonia | Villach, Austria |
| 19:30 | | | 26' Sikov | Stadium: Stadion Villach-Lind; Attendance: 1,000; Referee: Manfred Krassnitzer (Austria) |

| 5 June 2010 Friendly | Romania | 3–0 | Honduras | Sankt Veit an der Glan, Austria |
| 19:30 | Niculae 20'; Florescu 46'; Rădoi 77' | | | Stadium: Jacques Lemans Arena; Attendance: 1,500; Referee: Gerhard Grobelnik (Austria) |

| 11 August 2010 Friendly | Turkey | 2–0 | Romania | Istanbul, Turkey |
| 20:15 | Emre 82'; Arda 86' | | | Stadium: Şükrü Saracoğlu Stadium; Attendance: 20,000; Referee: Milorad Mažić (Serbia) |

| 3 September 2010 Euro 2012 Q | Romania | 1–1 | Albania | Piatra Neamț, Romania |
| 21:00 | Stancu 80' | | 88' Muzaka | Stadium: Stadionul Ceahlăul; Attendance: 15,000; Referee: Robert Schörgenhofer (Austria) |

| 7 September 2010 Euro 2012 Q | Belarus | 0–0 | Romania | Minsk, Belarus |
| 19:30 | | | | Stadium: Dinamo Stadium; Attendance: 26,354; Referee: Pavel Královec (Czech Republic) |

| 9 October 2010 Euro 2012 Q | France | 2–0 | Romania | Paris, France |
| 21:00 | Remy 83'; Gourcouff 90+3' | | | Stadium: Stade de France; Attendance: 79,299; Referee: Pedro Proença (Portugal) |

| 17 November 2010 Friendly | Romania | 1–1 | Italy | Klagenfurt, Austria |
| 20:30 | Marica 35' | | 82' Marica (autogol) | Stadium: Wörthersee Stadion; Attendance: 5,436; Referee: Thomas Einwaller (Austria) |

== 2011 ==
| 8 February 2011 Cyprus Tournament | Romania | 2–2 (2–4 p) | Ukraine | Paralimni, Cyprus |
| 20:30 | Alexa 33' 44' | | 23' Rakitki; 31' Artem Milevskyi | Stadium: Tasos Markou; Attendance: 3,000; Referee: Stelios Trifonos (Cyprus) |
| | Penalties |
| | Papp (penalty missed); Zicu (penalty missed); Raț (penalty scored); Ganea (penalty scored) | | (penalty missed) Gusiev; (penalty scored) Rotan; (penalty scored) Kravet; (penalty scored) Timosciuk; (penalty scored) Iarmolenko |

| 9 February 2011 Cyprus Tournament | Cyprus | 1–1 (4–5 p) | Romania | Paralimni, Cyprus |
| 20:30 | Constantiniou 83' | | 56' Torje | Stadium: Tasos Markou Stadium; Attendance: 2,000; Referee: Viktor Shvetsov (Ukraine) |
| | Penalties |
| | Avraam (penalty missed); Chrysostomous (penalty missed); Constantiniou (penalty scored); Charalambides (penalty scored); Aloneftis (penalty scored); Dobrašinović (penalty scored) | | (penalty missed) Bucur; (penalty scored) Râpă; (penalty scored) Torje; (penalty scored) Raț; (penalty scored) Tamaș; (penalty scored) Marica |

| 26 March 2011 Euro 2012 Q | Bosnia and Herzegovina | 2–1 | Romania | Zenica, Bosnia and Herzegovina |
| 20:15 | Ibišević 63'; Džeko 83' | Report | 29' Marica | Stadium: Stadion Bilino Polje; Attendance: 13,000; Referee: Fernando Teixeira (Spain) |

| 29 March 2011 Euro 2012 Q | Romania | 3–1 | Luxembourg | Piatra Neamț, Romania |
| 20:45 | Mutu 24' 68'; Zicu 78' | Report | 22' Gerson | Stadium: Stadionul Ceahlăul; Attendance: 13,500; Referee: Hüseyin Göçek (Turkey) |

| 3 June 2011 Euro 2012 Q | Romania | 3–0 | Bosnia and Herzegovina | Bucharest, Romania |
| 21:00 | Mutu 37'; Marica 41' 55' | Report | | Stadium: Stadionul Giulești; Attendance: 8,200; Referee: Jonas Eriksson (Sweden) |

| 8 June 2011 Friendly | Brazil | 1–0 | Romania | São Paulo, Brazil |
| 03:55 | Fred 21' | Report | | Stadium: Pacaembu Stadium; Attendance: 30,050; Referee: Sergio Pezzotta (Argentina) |

| 12 June 2011 Friendly | Paraguay | 2–0 | Romania | Asunción, Paraguay |
| 01:00 | Valdéz 2'; Santa Cruz 28' | Report | | Stadium: Estadio Defensores del Chaco; Attendance: 8.000; Referee: Jorge Larrionda (Uruguay) |

| 10 August 2011 Friendly | San Marino | 0–1 | Romania | Serravalle, San Marino |
| 21:30 | | Report | 72' Herea | Stadium: Stadio Olimpico di Serravalle; Attendance: 3,000; Referee: Gianluca Rocchi (Italy) |

| 2 September 2011 Euro 2012 Q | Luxembourg | 0–2 | Romania | Luxembourg, Luxembourg |
| 20:30 | | Report | Torje 34' 45' | Stadium: Josy Barthel Stadium; Attendance: 2,812; Referee: Sergey Karasyov (Russia) |

| 6 September 2011 Euro 2012 Q | Romania | 0–0 | France | Bucharest, Romania |
| 21:30 | | Report | | Stadium: Arena Națională; Attendance: 49,137; Referee: Howard Webb (England) |

| 7 October 2011 Euro 2012 Q | Romania | 2–2 | Belarus | Bucharest, Romania |
| 21:30 | Mutu 19' 51' (pen) | Report | 45' Kornilenko; 82' Drahun | Stadium: Arena Națională; Attendance: 29,486; Referee: Allan Kelly (Rep. of Ireland) |

| 11 October 2011 Euro 2012 Q | Albania | 1–1 | Romania | Tirana, Albania |
| 21:00 | Salihi 24' | Report | 77' Luchin | Stadium: Stadiumi Kombetar Qemal Stafa; Attendance: 3,000; Referee: Gediminas Mažeika (Lithuania) |

| 11 November 2011 Friendly | Belgium | 2–1 | Romania | Liège, Belgium |
| 21:45 | Van Buyten 11'; Cociș 43' (o.g.) | Report | 67' Niculae | Stadium: Stade Maurice Dufrasne; Attendance: 20,000; Referee: Saïd Ennjimi (France) |

| 15 November 2011 Friendly | Greece | 1–3 | Romania | Altach, Austria |
| 21:30 | Karagounis 34' | Report | 17' Torje; 61' Tănase; 81' Chipciu | Stadium: Cashpoint Arena; Attendance: 1,500; Referee: Thomas Gangl (Austria) |

== 2012 ==
| 27 January 2012 Friendly | Romania | 4–0 | Turkmenistan | Belek, Turkey |
| 19:00 UTC+02:00 | M. Niculae 3', 90+1' (.pen); Tănase 47', 51' | Report | | Stadium: Belek Stadium; Attendance: 100; Referee: Suren Baliyan (Armenia) |

| 29 February 2012 Friendly | Romania | 1–1 | Uruguay | Bucharest, Romania |
| 20:30 UTC+02:00 | Stancu 50' | Report | Cavani 2' | Stadium: Arena Națională; Attendance: 15,000; Referee: Viktor Kassai (Hungary) |

| 30 May 2012 Friendly | Switzerland | 0–1 | Romania | Luzern, Switzerland |
| 21:15 UTC+01:00 | | Report | Grozav 56' | Stadium: Swissporarena; Attendance: 11,850; Referee: Sevein Moen (Norway) |

| 5 June 2012 Friendly | Austria | 0–0 | Romania | Innsbruck, Austria |
| 21:30 UTC+03:00 | | Report | | Stadium: Tivoli-Neu; Attendance: 12,500; Referee: Danny Makkelie (Netherlands) |

| 15 August 2012 Friendly | Slovenia | 4–3 | Romania | Ljubljana, Slovenia |
| 21:45 UTC+03:00 | Cesar 4'; Dedič 50', 60' (pen.); Kirm 70' | Report | Papp 56'; Torje 68' (pen.); Grozav 79' | Stadium: Stadion Stožice; Attendance: 5,000; Referee: Emir Alečković (Bosnia and Herzegovina) |

| 7 September 2012 2014 World Cup Q | Estonia | 0–2 | Romania | Tallinn, Estonia |
| 21:00 UTC+03:00 | | Report | Torje 55'; Marica 75' | Stadium: A. Le Coq Arena; Attendance: 7,936; Referee: Milorad Mažić (Serbia) |

| 11 September 2012 2014 World Cup Q | Romania | 4–0 | Andorra | Bucharest, Romania |
| 20:30 UTC+03:00 | Torje 29'; Lazăr 44'; Găman 90+1'; Maxim 90+3' | Report | | Stadium: Arena Națională; Attendance: 24,630; Referee: Pavle Radovanović (Montenegro) |

| 12 October 2012 2014 World Cup Q | Turkey | 0–1 | Romania | Istanbul, Turkey |
| 20:30 UTC+03:00 | | Report | Grozav 45+1' | Stadium: Şükrü Saracoğlu Stadium; Attendance: 46,203; Referee: Howard Webb (England) |

| 16 October 2012 2014 World Cup Q | Romania | 1–4 | Netherlands | Bucharest, Romania |
| 21:00 UTC+03:00 | Marica 40' | Report | Lens 9'; Martins Indi 29' van der Vaart 45+2' (pen.) van Persie 86' | Stadium: Arena Națională; Attendance: 53,329; Referee: Craig Thomson (Scotland) |

| 14 November 2012 Friendly | Romania | 2–1 | Belgium | Bucharest, Romania |
| 21:00 UTC+02:00 | Maxim 32'; Torje 66' (pen.) | Report | Benteke 23' | Stadium: Arena Națională; Attendance: approx. 5,000; Referee: Mauro Bergonzi (Italy) |

== 2013 ==
| 6 February 2013 Friendly | Romania | 3–2 | Australia | Marbella, Spain |
| 21:45 UTC+02:00 | Tănase 35'; Stancu 80'; Torje 84' | Report | Wilkshire 45' (pen.); Cornthwaite 54' | Stadium: Estadio Municipal de Marbella; Attendance: approx. 1,000; Referee: Carlos Velasco Carballo (Spain) |

| 22 March 2013 2014 World Cup Q | Hungary | 2–2 | Romania | Budapest, Hungary |
| 21:30 UTC+02:00 | Vanczák 16'; Dzsudzsák 71' (pen.) | Report | Mutu 68' (pen.); Chipciu 90+2' | Stadium: Ferenc Puskás Stadium; Referee: Wolfgang Stark (Germany) |
Note: Hungary v Romania was played without spectators due to sanctions imposed by FIFA as a result of racist chanting by Hungarian supporters.

| 26 March 2013 2014 World Cup Q | Netherlands | 4–0 | Romania | Amsterdam, Netherlands |
| 21:30 UTC+02:00 | van der Vaart 12' van Persie 56', 65' (pen.); Lens 90' | Report | | Stadium: Amsterdam ArenA; Attendance: 47,496; Referee: Mark Clattenburg (England) |

| 4 June 2013 Friendly | Romania | 4–0 | Trinidad and Tobago | Bucharest, Romania |
| 20:45 UTC+03:00 | Marica 30', 32', 81'; Cyrus 49' (o.g.) | Report | | Stadium: Arena Națională; Attendance: 10,128; Referee: Milorad Mažić (Serbia) |

| 14 August 2013 Friendly | Romania | 1–1 | Slovakia | Bucharest, Romania |
| 21:00 UTC+03:00 | Stancu 44' | Report | Šesták 56' | Stadium: Arena Națională; Attendance: 6,738; Referee: Neil Doyle (Ireland) |

| 6 September 2013 2014 World Cup Q | Romania | 3–0 | Hungary | Bucharest, Romania |
| 21:00 UTC+03:00 | Marica 2'; Pintilii 31'; Tănase 88' | Report | | Stadium: Arena Națională; Attendance: 41,405; Referee: Alberto Undiano Mallenco (Spain) |

| 10 September 2013 2014 World Cup Q | Romania | 0–2 | Turkey | Bucharest, Romania |
| 21:00 UTC+03:00 | | Report | Yılmaz 22'; Erdinç 90+5' | Stadium: Arena Națională; Attendance: 44,357; Referee: Svein Oddvar Moen (Norway) |

| 11 October 2013 2014 World Cup Q | Andorra | 0–4 | Romania | Andorra la Vella, Andorra |
| 21:30 UTC+03:00 | | Report | Keserü 41'; Stancu 53'; Torje 63' (pen.); Lazăr 83' | Stadium: Estadi Comunal d'Andorra la Vella; Attendance: 1100; Referee: Stephan Klossner (Switzerland) |

| 15 October 2013 2014 World Cup Q | Romania | 2–0 | Estonia | Bucharest, Romania |
| 21:00 UTC+03:00 | Marica 31' (pen.), 81' | Report | | Stadium: Arena Națională; Attendance: 18,852; Referee: Marijo Strahonja (Croatia) |

| 15 November 2013 2014 World Cup Q | Greece | 3–1 | Romania | Piraeus, Greece |
| 21:45 UTC+02:00 | Mitroglou 14', 66'; Salpingidis 20' | Report | Stancu 19' | Stadium: Karaiskakis Stadium; Attendance: 26,200; Referee: Pedro Proença (Portugal) |

| 19 November 2013 2014 World Cup Q | Romania | 1–1 (2–4 agg.) | Greece | Bucharest, Romania |
| 21:00 UTC+02:00 | Torosidis 55' (o.g.) | Report | Mitroglou 23' | Stadium: Arena Națională; Attendance: 53,174; Referee: Milorad Mažić (Serbia) |
Note: Greece won 4–2 on aggregate and qualified for the 2014 FIFA World Cup.

== 2014 ==
| 5 March 2014 Friendly | Romania | 0–0 | Argentina | Bucharest, Romania |
| 21:00 UTC+02:00 | | Report | | Stadium: Arena Națională; Attendance: 45,034; Referee: Gianluca Rocchi (Italy) |

| 31 May 2014 Friendly | Romania | 1–0 | Albania | Yverdon-les-Bains, Switzerland |
| 20:00 UTC+03:00 | Raț 82' | Report | | Stadium: Stade Municipal; Attendance: 3,000; Referee: Nikolaj Hänni (Switzerland) |

| 4 June 2014 Friendly | Romania | 1–2 | Algeria | Geneva, Switzerland |
| 21:30 UTC+03:00 | Chipciu 28' | Report | Bentaleb 22'; Soudani 66' | Stadium: Stade de Genève; Attendance: 15,000; Referee: Nikolaj Hänni (Switzerland) |

| 7 September 2014 Euro 2016 Q | Greece | 0–1 | Romania | Piraeus, Greece |
| 21:45 UTC+02:00 | | Report | Marica 10' (pen.) | Stadium: Karaiskakis Stadium; Attendance: 0 (closed to spectators); Referee: Mark Clattenburg (England) |

| 11 October 2014 Euro 2016 Q | Romania | 1–1 | Hungary | Bucharest, Romania |
| 19:00 UTC+02:00 | Rusescu 45' | Report | Dzsudzsák 82' | Stadium: Arena Națională; Attendance: 50,085; Referee: William Collum (Scotland) |

| 14 October 2014 Euro 2016 Q | Finland | 0–2 | Romania | Helsinki, Finland |
| 21:45 UTC+02:00 | | Report | Stancu 54', 83' | Stadium: Olympiastadion; Attendance: 19,408; Referee: Paolo Tagliavento (Italy) |

| 14 November 2014 Euro 2016 Q | Romania | 2–0 | Northern Ireland | Bucharest, Romania |
| 21:45 UTC+02:00 | Papp 74', 79' | Report; Report 2 | | Stadium: Arena Națională; Attendance: 28,892; Referee: Jonas Eriksson (Sweden) |

| 18 November 2014 Friendly | Romania | 2–0 | Denmark | Bucharest, Romania |
| 20:30 UTC+02:00 | Keșerü 53', 58' | Report | | Stadium: Arena Națională; Attendance: 5,000; Referee: Slavko Vinčić (Slovenia) |

== 2015 ==
| 29 March 2015 Euro 2016 Q | Romania | 1–0 | Faroe Islands | Ploiești, Romania |
| 19:00 UTC+02:00 | Keșerü 21' | Report | | Stadium: Ilie Oană Stadium; Attendance: 15,000; Referee: Artur Dias |

| 13 June 2015 Euro 2016 Q | Northern Ireland | 0–0 | Romania | Belfast, Northern Ireland |
| 21:45 UTC+02:00 | | Report | | Stadium: Windsor Park; Attendance: 10,000; Referee: Carlos Velasco Carballo (Spain) |

| 4 September 2015 Euro 2016 Q | Hungary | 0–0 | Romania | Budapest, Hungary |
| 21:45 UTC+02:00 | | Report | | Stadium: Groupama Aréna; Attendance: 20,000; Referee: Felix Brych (Germany) |

| 7 September 2015 Euro 2016 Q | Romania | 0–0 | Greece | Bucharest, Romania |
| 21:45 UTC+02:00 | | Report | | Stadium: Arena Națională; Referee: Aleksei Kulbakov (Belarus) |

| 8 October 2015 Euro 2016 Q | Romania | 1–1 | Finland | Bucharest, Romania |
| 21:45 UTC+02:00 | Hoban 90+1' | Report | Pohjanpalo 67' | Stadium: Arena Națională; Attendance: 47,987; Referee: Craig Thomson (Scotland) |

| 11 October 2015 Euro 2016 Q | Faroe Islands | 0–3 | Romania | Tórshavn, Faroe Islands |
| 19:00 UTC+02:00 | | Report | Budescu 4', 45+1' Maxim 83' | Stadium: Tórsvøllur; Referee: Ivan Kružliak (Slovakia) |

| 17 November 2015 Friendly | Italy | 2–2 | Romania | Bologna, Italy |
| 21:45 UTC+02:00 | Marchisio 55' (pen.); Gabbiadini 66' | Report | Stancu 8'; Andone 89' | Stadium: Stadio Renato Dall'Ara; Attendance: 22,511; Referee: Adrien Jaccottet (Switzerland) |

== 2016 ==
| 23 March 2016 Friendly | Romania | 1–0 | Lithuania | Giurgiu, Romania |
| 20:00 UTC+02:00 | Stanciu 65' | Report | | Stadium: Stadionul Marin Anastasovici; Attendance: 4,368; Referee: David Fernández Borbalán (Spain) |

| 27 March 2016 Friendly | Romania | 0–0 | Spain | Cluj-Napoca, Romania |
| 20:45 GMT | | Report | | Stadium: Cluj Arena; Attendance: 28,000; Referee: Ruddy Buquet (France) |

| 25 May 2016 Friendly | Romania | 1–1 | DR Congo | Como, Italy |
| 18:00 GMT | Stanciu 27' | Report | Bokila 87' | Stadium: Stadio Giuseppe Sinigaglia; Attendance: 1,500; Referee: Paolo Valeri (Italy) |

| 29 May 2016 Friendly | Romania | 3–4 | Ukraine | Turin, Italy |
| 20:30 UTC+02:00 | Torje 23'; Alibec 74'; Stanciu 85' | Report | Zozulya 43'; Zinchenko 48'; Konoplyanka 54'; Yarmolenko 59' | Stadium: Stadio Olimpico Grande Torino; Attendance: 12,000; Referee: Davide Massa (Italy) |

| 3 June 2016 Friendly | Romania | 5–1 | Georgia | Bucharest, Romania |
| 21:00 UTC+03:00 | Popa 2'; Amisulashvili 3' (o.g.); Stanciu 49'; Torje 80'; Keșerü 87' | Report | Moți 68' (o.g.) | Stadium: Arena Națională; Attendance: 27,934; Referee: Artur Soares Dias (Portugal) |

| 10 June 2016 Euro 2016 | France | 2–1 | Romania | Saint-Denis, France |
| 21:00 CET | Giroud 57'; Payet 89' | Report | Stancu 65' (pen.) | Stadium: Stade de France; Attendance: 75,113; Referee: Viktor Kassai (Hungary) |

| 15 June 2016 Euro 2016 | Romania | 1–1 | Switzerland | Paris, France |
| 18:00 CET | Stancu 18' (pen.) | Report | Mehmedi 57' | Stadium: Parc des Princes; Attendance: 43,576; Referee: Sergei Karasev (Russia) |

| 19 June 2016 Euro 2016 | Romania | 0–1 | Albania | Lyon, France |
| 21:00 CET | | Report | Sadiku 43' | Stadium: Stade des Lumières; Attendance: 49,752; Referee: Pavel Kralovec (Czech Republic) |

| 4 September 2016 2018 World Cup Q | Romania | 1–1 | Montenegro | Cluj-Napoca, Romania |
| 20:45 (21:45 UTC+3) | Popa 85' | Report | Jovetić 87' | Stadium: Cluj Arena; Attendance: 25,468; Referee: Anthony Taylor (England) |

| 8 October 2016 2018 World Cup Q | Armenia | 0–5 | Romania | Yerevan, Armenia |
| 18:00 (20:00 UTC+4) | | Report | Stancu 4' (pen.); Popa 10'; Marin 12'; Stanciu 29'; Chipciu 59' | Stadium: Vazgen Sargsyan Republican Stadium; Attendance: 5,500; Referee: Vladislav Bezborodov (Russia) |

| 11 October 2016 2018 World Cup Q | Kazakhstan | 0–0 | Romania | Astana, Kazakhstan |
| 18:00 (22:00 UTC+6) | | Report | | Stadium: Astana Arena; Attendance: 12,346; Referee: Jorge Sousa (Portugal) |

| 11 November 2016 2018 World Cup Q | Romania | 0–3 | Poland | Bucharest, Romania |
| 20:45 (21:45 UTC+2) | | Report | Grosicki 11'; Lewandowski 82', 90+1' (pen.) | Stadium: Arena Națională; Attendance: 48,531; Referee: Damir Skomina (Slovenia) |

| 15 November 2016 Friendly | Russia | 1–0 | Romania | Grozny, Russia |
| 18:00 UTC+2 | Ozdoev 90+3' | (Report) | | Stadium: Akhmat-Arena; Attendance: 30,000; Referee: Aleksei Kulbakov (Belarus) |

== 2017 ==
| 26 March 2017 2018 World Cup Q | Romania | 0–0 | Denmark | Cluj-Napoca, Romania |
| 21:45 UTC+02:00 | | Report | | Stadium: Cluj Arena; Attendance: 26,895; Referee: Martin Atkinson (England) |

| 10 June 2017 2018 World Cup Q | Poland | 3–1 | Romania | Warsaw, Poland |
| 21:45 UTC+02:00 | Lewandowski 29' (pen.), 57', 62' (pen.) | Report | Stancu 77' | Stadium: Stadion Narodowy; Attendance: 57,128; Referee: Ruddy Buquet (France) |

| 13 June 2017 Friendly | Romania | 3–2 | Chile | Cluj-Napoca, Romania |
| 21:00 UTC+02:00 | Stancu 31'; Stanciu 60'; Băluță 83' | Report | Vargas 8'; Valencia 18' | Stadium: Cluj Arena; Attendance: 9,000; Referee: Bas Nijhuis (Netherlands) |

| 1 September 2017 2018 World Cup Q | Romania | 1–0 | Armenia | Bucharest, Romania |
| 21:45 UTC+02:00 | Maxim 90+1' | Report | | Stadium: Arena Națională; Attendance: 27,178; Referee: Ivan Bebek (Croatia) |

| 4 September 2017 2018 World Cup Q | Montenegro | 1–0 | Romania | Podgorica, Montenegro |
| 21:45 UTC+02:00 | Jovetić 75' | Report | | Stadium: Stadion pod Goricom; Attendance: 9,452; Referee: Craig Thomson (Scotland) |

| 5 October 2017 2018 World Cup Q | Romania | 3–1 | Kazakhstan | Ploiești, Romania |
| 21:45 UTC+02:00 | Budescu 33', 38' (pen.); Keșerü 73' | Report | Turysbek 82' | Stadium: Stadionul Ilie Oană; Attendance: 10,123; Referee: Sandro Schärer (Switzerland) |

| 8 October 2017 2018 World Cup Q | Denmark | 1–1 | Romania | Copenhagen, Denmark |
| 19:00 UTC+02:00 | Eriksen 59' (pen.) | Report | Deac 88' | Stadium: Telia Parken; Attendance: 36,084; Referee: Deniz Aytekin (Germany) |

| 9 November 2017 Friendly | Romania | 2–0 | Turkey | Cluj-Napoca, Romania |
| 20:15 UTC+02:00 | Grozav 42', 69' | Report; Report 2 | | Stadium: Stadionul Dr. Constantin Rădulescu; Attendance: 20,000; Referee: Tiago Martins (Portugal) |

| 14 November 2017 Friendly | Romania | 0–3 | Netherlands | Bucharest, Romania |
| 19:00 UTC+02:00 | | Report | Depay 47'; Babel 57' de Jong 81' | Stadium: Arena Națională; Attendance: 26,000; Referee: Christos Nikolaidis (Cyprus) |

== 2018 ==
| 24 March 2018 Friendly | Israel | 1–2 | Romania | Netanya, Israel |
| 19:00 UTC+02:00 | Hemed 60' | Report | Stanciu 64'; Țucudean 82' | Stadium: Netanya Stadium; Attendance: 7,925; Referee: Demetrios Masias (Cyprus) |

| 27 March 2018 Friendly | Romania | 1–0 | Sweden | Craiova, Romania |
| 20:30 UTC+03:00 | Rotariu 57' | Report | | Stadium: Stadionul Ion Oblemenco; Attendance: 20,000; Referee: Roi Reinshreiber (Israel) |

| 31 May 2018 Friendly | Romania | 3–2 | Chile | Graz, Austria |
| 16:00 UTC+03:00 | Stanciu 13'; Deac 66'; Budescu 84' | Report | Maripán 32'; Reyes 52' | Stadium: Liebenauer Stadium; Attendance: 2,500; Referee: Christopher Jäger (Austria) |

| 5 June 2018 Friendly | Romania | 2–0 | Finland | Ploiești, Romania |
| 19:30 UTC+03:00 | Manea 37'; Deac 61' | Report | | Stadium: Stadionul Ilie Oană; Attendance: 13,312; Referee: Robert Harvey (Republic of Ireland) |

| 7 September 2018 2018–19 Nations League | Romania | 0–0 | Montenegro | Ploiești, Romania |
| 21:45 UTC+03:00 | | Report | | Stadium: Stadionul Ilie Oană; Attendance: 0 (closed doors); Referee: Ivan Kružliak (Slovakia) |

| 10 September 2018 2018–19 Nations League | Serbia | 2–2 | Romania | Belgrade, Serbia |
| 21:45 UTC+03:00 | Mitrović 26', 63' | Report | Stanciu 48' (pen.); Țucudean 68' | Stadium: Red Star Stadium; Attendance: 15,496; Referee: Vladislav Bezborodov (Russia) |

| 11 October 2018 2018–19 Nations League | Lithuania | 1–2 | Romania | Vilnius, Lithuania |
| 21:45 UTC+03:00 | Žulpa 90' | Report | Chipciu 13'; Maxim 90+4' | Stadium: LFF Stadium; Attendance: 2,279; Referee: François Letexier (France) |

| 14 October 2018 2018–19 Nations League | Romania | 0–0 | Serbia | Bucharest, Romania |
| 16:00 UTC+03:00 | | Report | | Stadium: Arena Națională; Attendance: 48,513; Referee: Kevin Blom (Netherlands) |

| 17 November 2018 2018–19 Nations League | Romania | 3–0 | Lithuania | Ploiești, Romania |
| 21:45 UTC+02:00 | Pușcaș 7'; Keșerü 47'; Stanciu 65' | Report | | Stadium: Stadionul Ilie Oană; Attendance: 34 (only away supporters); Referee: Marco Guida (Italy) |

| 20 November 2018 2018–19 Nations League | Montenegro | 0–1 | Romania | Podgorica, Montenegro |
| 21:45 UTC+02:00 | | Report | Țucudean 44' | Stadium: City Stadium; Attendance: 3,574; Referee: Felix Zwayer (Germany) |

== 2019 ==
| 23 March 2019 Euro 2020 Q | Sweden | 2–1 | Romania | Solna, Sweden |
| 18:00 UTC+01:00 | Quaison 33'; Claesson 40' | Report | Keșerü 58' | Stadium: Friends Arena; Attendance: 30,115; Referee: Michael Oliver (England) |

| 26 March 2019 Euro 2020 Q | Romania | 4–1 | Faroe Islands | Cluj-Napoca, Romania |
| 21:45 UTC+02:00 | Deac 26'; Keșerü 29', 33'; Pușcaș 63' | Report | Davidsen 40' (pen.) | Stadium: Stadionul Dr. Constantin Rădulescu; Attendance: 10,502; Referee: Halil Umut Meler (Turkey) |

| 7 June 2019 Euro 2020 Q | Norway | 2–2 | Romania | Oslo, Norway |
| 20:45 UTC+02:00 | T. Elyounoussi 56'; Ødegaard 70' | Report | Keșerü 77', 90+2' | Stadium: Ullevaal Stadion; Attendance: 17,664; Referee: Sergei Karasev (Russia) |

| 10 June 2019 Euro 2020 Q | Malta | 0–4 | Romania | Ta' Qali, Malta |
| 20:45 UTC+02:00 | | Report | Pușcaș 7', 29'; Chipciu 34'; Man 90+1' | Stadium: National Stadium; Attendance: 6,000; Referee: Dennis Higler (Netherlands) |

| 5 September 2019 Euro 2020 Q | Romania | 1–2 | Spain | Bucharest, Romania |
| 21:45 UTC+03:00 | Andone 59' | Report | Ramos 29' (pen.); Alcácer 47' | Stadium: Arena Națională; Attendance: 50,024; Referee: Deniz Aytekin (Germany) |

| 8 September 2019 Euro 2020 Q | Romania | 1–0 | Malta | Ploiești, Romania |
| 19:00 UTC+03:00 | Pușcaș 47' | Report | | Stadium: Ilie Oană Stadium; Attendance: 13,376; Referee: Duje Strukan (Croatia) |

| 12 October 2019 Euro 2020 Q | Faroe Islands | 0–3 | Romania | Tórshavn, Faroe Islands |
| 17:00 UTC+01:00 | | Report | Pușcaș 74'; Mitriță 83'; Keșerü 90+4' | Stadium: Tórsvøllur; Referee: Aliyar Aghayev (Azerbaijan) |

| 15 October 2019 Euro 2020 Q | Romania | 1–1 | Norway | Bucharest, Romania |
| 21:45 UTC+03:00 | Mitriță 62' | Report | Sørloth 90+2' | Stadium: Arena Națională; Referee: Bobby Madden (Scotland) |

| 15 November 2019 Euro 2020 Q | Romania | 0–2 | Sweden | Bucharest, Romania |
| 21:45 UTC+02:00 | | Report | Berg 18'; Quaison 34' | Stadium: Arena Națională; Referee: Daniele Orsato (Italy) |

| 18 November 2019 Euro 2020 Q | Spain | 5–0 | Romania | Madrid, Spain |
| 20:45 UTC+01:00 | Fabián 8'; Gerard 33', 43'; Rus 45+1' (o.g.); Oyarzabal 90+2' | Report | | Stadium: Estadio Metropolitano; Referee: Aleksei Kulbakov (Belarus) |
