= Armin Gigović =

Bosnian footballer (born 2002)

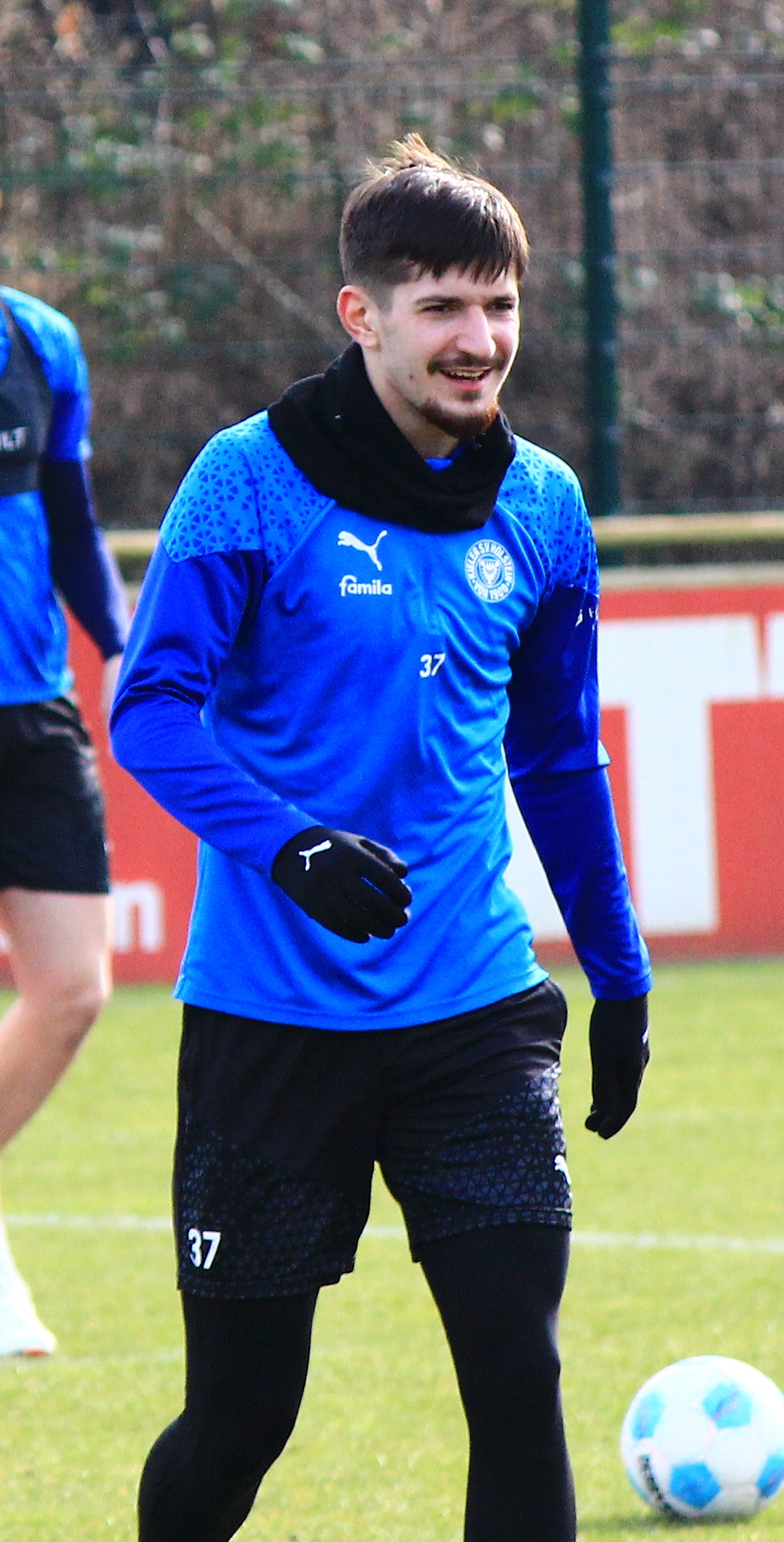
- Gigović with Holstein Kiel in 2025

Personal information
- Date of birth: 6 April 2002 (age 24)
- Place of birth: Lund, Sweden
- Height: 1.87 m (6 ft 2 in)
- Position: Midfielder

Team information
- Current team: Young Boys
- Number: 8

Youth career
- 2013–2017: Landskrona BoIS
- 2017–2019: Helsingborgs IF

Senior career*
Years	Team	Apps	(Gls)
2019–2020	Helsingborgs IF	34	(1)
2020–2024	Rostov	30	(1)
2022	→ Helsingborgs IF (loan)	16	(2)
2022	→ OB (loan)	9	(1)
2023–2024	→ Midtjylland (loan)	42	(0)
2024–2025	Holstein Kiel	32	(6)
2025–	Young Boys	45	(2)

International career^{‡}
2019	Sweden U17	7	(0)
2019	Sweden U19	3	(1)
2020–2024	Sweden U21	21	(2)
2023–2024	Sweden	2	(0)
2024–	Bosnia and Herzegovina	28	(3)
- * Club domestic league appearances and goals as of 21 November 2026 ‡ National team caps and goals as of 17 November 2026

Armin Gigović (pronounced [ǎrmin ɡîːgoʋitɕ]; born 6 April 2002) is a professional footballer who plays as a midfielder for Swiss Super League club Young Boys. Born in Sweden, he plays for the Bosnia and Herzegovina national team.

Gigović started his professional career at Helsingborgs IF, before joining Rostov in 2020, who loaned him back to Helsingborgs IF in 2022, to OB later that year and to Midtjylland in 2023. The following year, he signed with Holstein Kiel. In 2025, he was transferred to Young Boys.

A former Swedish youth international, Gigović also made his senior international debut for Sweden, before switching his allegiance to Bosnia and Herzegovina in 2024, earning over 20 caps since. He represented the nation at the 2026 FIFA World Cup.

== Club career ==
=== Early career ===
Gigović started playing football at Landskrona BoIS, before joining Helsingborgs IF's youth setup in 2017. He made his professional debut against IK Sirius on 15 July 2019 at the age of 17. On 6 July 2020, he scored his first professional goal against Djurgårdens IF.

=== Rostov ===
In October 2020, Gigović signed a five-year deal with Russian side Rostov. He made his official debut for the team against Khimki on 25 October. On 17 March 2021, he scored his first goal for Rostov in a triumph over Rotor Volgograd.

In March 2022, Gigović was loaned to his former club Helsingborgs IF until the end of the season.

In August 2022, he was sent on a six-month loan to Danish outfit OB.

In January 2023, he was loaned to Midtjylland for the remainder of the campaign. In June, his loan was extended for an additional season.

=== Holstein Kiel ===
In July 2024, Gigović was transferred to German team Holstein Kiel for an undisclosed fee. He made his competitive debut for the squad on 31 August against VfL Wolfsburg. On 14 September, he scored his first goal for Holstein Kiel against Bayern Munich.

=== Young Boys ===
In August 2025, Gigović moved to Swiss outfit Young Boys on a contract until June 2029. He debuted officially for the side in a Swiss Cup game against Courtételle on 17 August. On 28 August, he scored a brace in a UEFA Europa League qualifier against Slovan Bratislava, which were his first goals for Young Boys. He made his league debut on 31 August against Lugano. Five months later, he scored his first league goal in a deafeat of Zürich.

== International career ==
After representing Sweden at all youth levels and captaining them at the under-21 level under coach Daniel Bäckström, Gigović made his senior international debut in a friendly game against Iceland on 12 January 2023. However, in April 2024, he decided that he would play for Bosnia and Herzegovina in the future.

In May, his request to change sports citizenship from Swedish to Bosnian was approved by FIFA. Later that month, he received his first senior call up, for friendly matches against England and Italy. He debuted against the former on 3 June.

On 21 March 2025, in a 2026 FIFA World Cup qualifier against Romania, he scored his first senior international goal, which secured the victory for his team.

In June 2026, Gigović was named in Bosnia and Herzegovina's squad for the 2026 FIFA World Cup. He made his tournament debut in the opening group tie against Canada on 12 June.

== Personal life ==
Gigović's younger brother Ervin is also a professional footballer.

== Career statistics ==
=== Club ===
As of match played 21 November 2026

Appearances and goals by club, season and competition
Club	Season	League			National cup (Note: Includes Svenska Cupen, Danish Cup, DFB-Pokal, Swiss Cup)		Continental		Other		Total	
Club	Season	Division	Apps	Goals	Apps	Goals	Apps	Goals	Apps	Goals	Apps	Goals
Helsingborgs IF	2019	Allsvenskan	14	0	0	0	–		–		14	0
Helsingborgs IF	2020	Allsvenskan	20	1	1	0	–		–		21	1
Helsingborgs IF	Total		34	0	1	0	–		–		35	0
Rostov	2020–21	Russian Premier League	17	1	0	0	–		–		17	1
Rostov	2021–22	Russian Premier League	13	0	0	0	–		–		13	0
Rostov	Total		30	0	0	0	–		–		30	0
Helsingborgs IF (loan)	2022	Allsvenskan	16	2	0	0	–		–		16	2
OB (loan)	2022–23	Danish Superliga	9	1	1	0	–		–		10	1
Midtjylland (loan)	2022–23	Danish Superliga	15	0	–		2 (Note: Appearances in UEFA Europa League)	0	1 (Note: Appearance in Danish Superliga play-offs for UEFA Conference League)	0	18	0
Midtjylland (loan)	2023–24	Danish Superliga	27	0	2	0	6 (Note: Appearances in UEFA Conference League)	1	–		35	1
Midtjylland (loan)	Total		42	0	2	0	8	1	1	0	53	1
Holstein Kiel	2024–25	Bundesliga	31	5	1	0	–		–		32	5
Holstein Kiel	2025–26	2. Bundesliga	1	1	0	0	–		–		1	1
Holstein Kiel	Total		32	6	1	0	–		–		33	6
Young Boys	2025–26	Swiss Super League	31	1	2	0	8	3	–		41	4
Young Boys	2026–27	Swiss Super League	14	1	2	0	–		–		16	1
Young Boys	Total		45	2	4	0	8	3	–		57	5
Career total			208	13	9	0	16	4	1	0	234	17

=== International ===
As of match played 17 November 2026

Appearances and goals by national team and year
National team	Year	Apps	Goals
Sweden
Sweden	2023	1	0
Sweden	2024	1	0
Sweden	Total	2	0
Bosnia and Herzegovina
Bosnia and Herzegovina	2024	8	0
Bosnia and Herzegovina	2025	9	1
Bosnia and Herzegovina	2026	11	2
Bosnia and Herzegovina	Total	28	3
Career total		30	3

Scores and results list Bosnia and Herzegovina's goal tally first, score column indicates score after each Gigović goal.

List of international goals scored by Armin Gigović
No.	Date	Venue	Cap	Opponent	Score	Result	Competition
1	21 March 2025	Arena Națională, Bucharest, Romania	9	Romania	1–0	1–0	2026 FIFA World Cup qualification
2	28 September 2026	Arena Națională, Bucharest, Romania	24	Romania	1–0	4–2	2026–27 UEFA Nations League B
3	14 November 2026	Nationalarenan, Solna, Sweden	27	Sweden	1–3	2–3	2026–27 UEFA Nations League B

== Honours ==
Midtjylland

- Danish Superliga: 2023–24
