= Samuele Zannoni =

Sammarinese footballer

Personal information
- Date of birth: 29 April 2002 (age 24)
- Position: Central midfielder

Team information
- Current team: Rimini

Senior career*
Years	Team	Apps	(Gls)
2021	Cailungo	7	(2)
2021–2023	CBR Carli Pietracuta		
2023–2024	ACD Torconca		
2024–2026	CBR Carli Pietracuta		
2026–	Rimini		

International career^{‡}
2022–2024	San Marino U21	12	(4)
2024–	San Marino	24	(1)
- * Club domestic league appearances and goals as of 5 November 2026 ‡ National team caps and goals as of 15 November 2026

Samuele Zannoni (born 29 April 2002) is a Sammarinese football player who plays as a central midfielder for Italian club Rimini and the San Marino national team.

== International career ==
Zannoni made his debut for the San Marino national team on 5 September 2024 in a Nations League game against Liechtenstein at the San Marino Stadium. He substituted Nicko Sensoli in the 62nd minute. 9 minutes earlier, Sensoli scored a goal which remained the only goal of the game and brought San Marino their first ever competitive victory, and their second-ever victory overall (the first victory came 20 years earlier in a friendly against Liechtenstein).

On 24 March 2025, Zannoni scored his first goal for San Marino in a 2026 FIFA World Cup qualification 1–5 defeat against Romania.

== Career statistics ==
=== International ===
As of 15 November 2026

San Marino
Year	Apps	Goals
2024	6	0
2025	10	1
2026	8	0
Total	24	1

=== International goals ===
As of match played 24 March 2025. San Marino score listed first, score column indicates score after each Zannoni goal.

International goals by date, venue, cap, opponent, score, result and competition
No.	Date	Venue	Cap	Opponent	Score	Result	Competition
1	24 March 2025	San Marino Stadium, Serravalle, San Marino	8	Romania	1–3	1–5	2026 FIFA World Cup qualification
