= Dante Rossi (footballer) =

Sammarinese-Argentine footballer

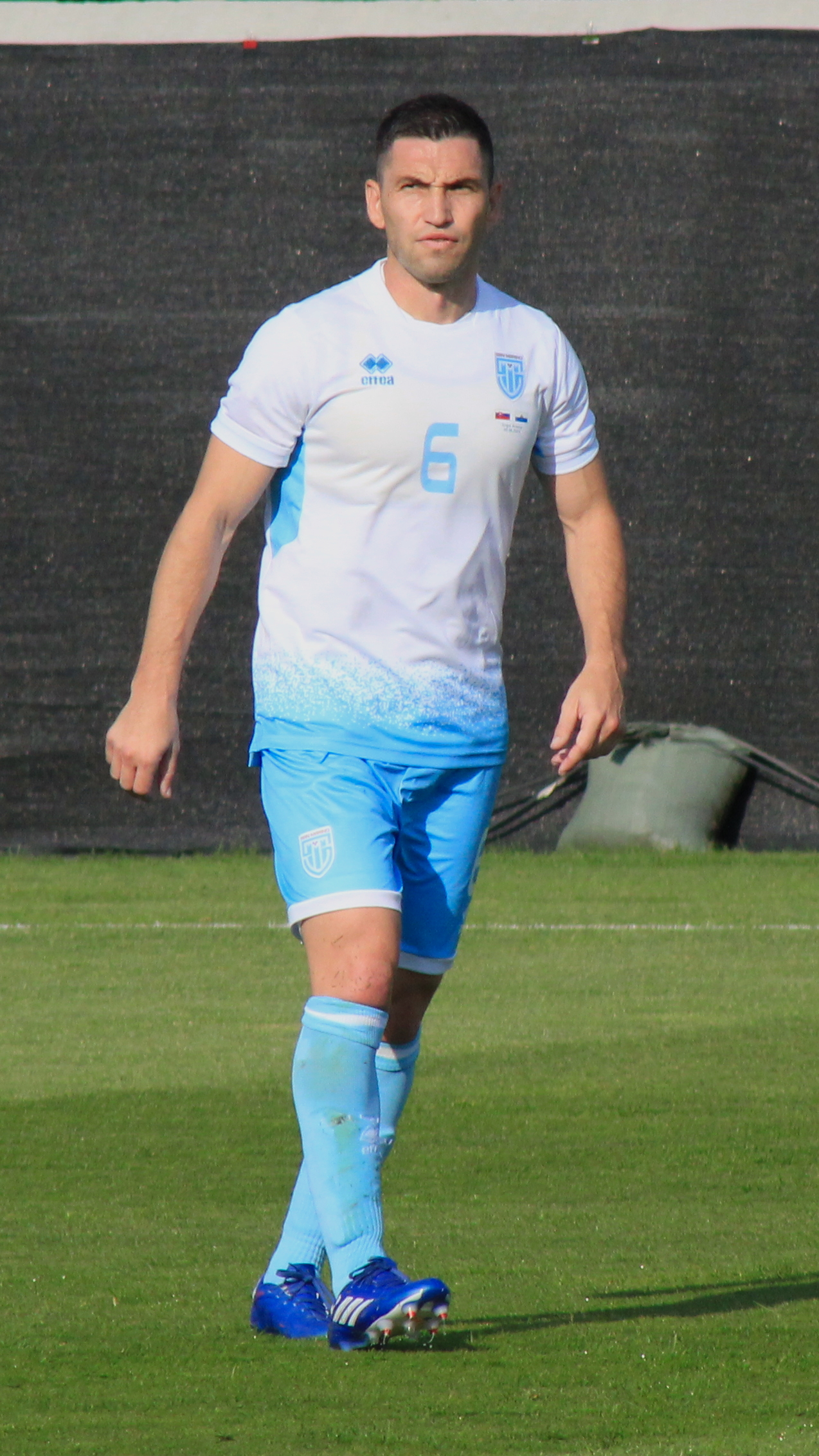
- Rossi with San Marino against Slovakia (2024)

Personal information
- Full name: Dante Carlos Rossi
- Date of birth: 12 July 1987 (age 39)
- Place of birth: Guerrico, Buenos Aires, Argentina
- Position: Centre-back

Team information
- Current team: Coriano

Senior career*
Years	Team	Apps	(Gls)
2006–2007	Newell's Old Boys	0	(0)
2007–2010	Club Atlético Jorge Griffa		
2015–2018	Club Atlético Pujato		
2018–2019	Club Atlético Centenario		
2019–2020	Pennarossa	1	(0)
2020–2021	Chiesanuova		
2021	Chions	6	(0)
2021–2022	Cattolica		
2021–2022	→ Foligno (loan)	22	(1)
2022–	Coriano	49+	(5+)

International career^{‡}
2020–	San Marino	42	(0)
- * Club domestic league appearances and goals as of 5 June 2026 ‡ National team caps and goals as of 6 October 2026

Dante Carlos Rossi (born 12 July 1987) is a footballer who plays as a centre-back for Coriano. Born in Argentina, he plays for the San Marino national team.

== International career ==
Rossi was born in Argentina and is a part-time MBA professional and is of Sammarinese descent through a great-grandfather. Rossi made his international debut for San Marino on 5 September 2020 in the UEFA Nations League against Gibraltar.

== Career statistics ==
=== International ===
As of 6 October 2026

San Marino
Year	Apps	Goals
2020	5	0
2021	10	0
2022	5	0
2023	10	0
2024	6	0
2025	3	0
2026	3	0
Total	42	0
