= List of San Marino international footballers =

The San Marino national football team (Italian: Nazionale di calcio di San Marino) represents the nation of San Marino in the international association football. It is fielded by the San Marino Football Federation (Italian: Federazione Sammarinese Giuoco Calcio), the governing body of football in San Marino, and competes as a member of the Union of European Football Associations (UEFA), which encompasses the countries of Europe. The San Marino Football Federation became affiliated with the Fédération Internationale de Football Association (English: International Federation of Association Football) (FIFA) in 1988 and the country's first international match took place two years later on 14 November 1990 against Switzerland in a UEFA Euro 1992 qualifier. San Marino's first result that was not a defeat was a 0–0 draw at home to Turkey in a 1994 FIFA World Cup qualifier on 10 March 1993, and the team's first and only win came over 10 years later after Liechtenstein were beaten 1–0 in a friendly on 28 April 2004.

Since 1990, 97 players have appeared for the San Marino national team, all of whom are listed here. Defender Damiano Vannucci holds the record for most caps, having appeared 64 times for San Marino from 1996 to 2011. The side's all-time top scorer is Andy Selva, who with eight goals from 57 caps is the only player except Nicola Nanni (2 goals) and Filippo Berardi (2 goals) to have scored more than one goal for San Marino. The team's most-capped goalkeeper, Federico Gasperoni, represented San Marino 41 times between 1996 and 2005. While San Marino have yet to qualify for the finals of a major international tournament, Davide Gualtieri holds the record for the fastest goal in a FIFA World Cup qualifier, scoring eight seconds into a 1994 World Cup qualifier against England on 17 February 1993.

== Players ==
Appearances and goals are composed of FIFA World Cup and UEFA European Football Championship qualification matches, as well as numerous international friendly matches. The years given in the column marked "national team career" are those of each player's first and last international cap. Players are listed by number of caps, then number of goals scored. If number of goals are equal, the players are then listed alphabetically. Statistics are correct as of the match played on 11 October 2011.

Key
^{†}	Still eligible for the national team (Note: Players marked as "still eligible for the national team" are those who have not retired from club football and who are, therefore, still selectable.)
GK	Goalkeeper
DF	Defender
MF	Midfielder
FW	Forward

San Marino national team footballers
#	Name	Position	National team career	Caps	Goals	Ref
1	Andy Selva	FW	1998–2016	73	8	
2	Damiano Vannucci	DF	1996–2011	64	0	
3	Simone Bacciocchi	DF	1998–2011	56	0	
4	Mirco Gennari	DF	1992–2003	48	0	
5	Paolo Montagna	FW	1995–2011	46	0	
6	Ivan Matteoni	MF	1990–2003	44	0	
7=	Federico Gasperoni	GK	1996–2005	41	0	
7=	Luca Gobbi	DF	1990–2002	41	0	
9	Nicola Albani	DF	2001–2011	40	1	
10=	William Guerra	DF	1990–1999	38	0	
10=	Pierangelo Manzaroli	MF	1991–2001	38	0	
12=	Alessandro Della Valle	DF	2002–2011	37	0	
12=	Carlo Valentini	MF	2002–2010	37	0	
14	Fabio Francini	MF	1990–1998	34	0	
15	Nicola Bacciocchi	MF	1991–2000	33	1	
16	Manuel Marani	FW	2003–2011	32	2	
17	Michele Marani	MF	2002–2009	30	0	
18	Riccardo Muccioli	MF	1996–2009	29	0	
19=	Bryan Gasperoni	MF	1994–2005	28	1	
19=	Marco Mazza	MF	1991–1997	28	0	
21	Aldo Junior Simoncini	GK	2006–2011	26	0	
22	Pierluigi Benedettini	GK	1990–1995	25	0	
23=	Matteo Andreini	DF	2005–2011	24	0	
23=	Mauro Marani	DF	1998–2009	24	0	
23=	Davide Simoncini	DF	2006–2011	24	0	
26	Mauro Valentini	DF	1991–1999	23	1	
27=	Matteo Bugli	MF	2006–2011	22	0	
27=	Claudio Canti	DF	1991–1995	22	0	
27=	Fabio Vitaioli	DF	2007–2011	22	0	
30=	Pier Domenico Della Valle	MF	1991–2000	21	1	
30=	Alex Gasperoni	MF	2003–2011	21	0	
30=	Matteo Vitaioli	FW	2007–2011	21	0	
30=	Ermanno Zonzini	MF	1999–2003	21	0	
34=	Maicol Berretti	MF	2007–2011	19	0	
34=	Massimo Bonini	MF	1990–1995	19	0	
36=	Marco de Luigi	FW	1999–2007	18	0	
36=	Vittorio Valentini	DF	1995–2003	18	0	
38=	Nicola Ciacci	FW	2003–2011	16	1	
38=	Giovanni Bonini	MF	2006–2009	16	0	
38=	Marco Domeniconi	MF	2004–2007	16	0	
41	Valdes Pasolini	FW	1990–1996	14	1	
42	Marco Mularoni	FW	1991–1996	13	0	
43=	Fabio Bollini	MF	2007–2011	12	0	
43=	Michele Cervellini	MF	2009–2011	12	0	
43=	Andrea Ugolini	FW	1995–2004	12	0	
43=	Loris Zanotti	MF	1990–1993	12	0	
47=	Simone Della Balda	DF	1999–2001	11	0	
47=	Roberto Selva	MF	1999–2005	11	0	
49=	Paolo Mazza	MF	1992–1993	10	0	
49=	Lorenzo Moretti	MF	2002–2004	10	0	
49=	Bruno Muccioli	DF	1990–1993	10	0	
49=	Federico Valentini	GK	2006–2011	10	0	
53=	Davide Gualtieri	FW	1993–1999	9	1	
53=	Michele Moretti	MF	2003–2006	9	0	
55=	Federico Crescentini	DF	2002–2006	8	0	
55=	Pier Filippo Mazza	MF	2010–2011	8	0	
55=	Luca Nanni	DF	2001–2005	8	0	
58=	Stefano Muccioli	GK	1993–1996	7	0	
58=	Federico Nanni	MF	2005–2011	7	0	
60=	Giacomo Benedettini	DF	2007–2011	6	0	
60=	Matteo Coppini	MF	2010–2011	6	0	
60=	Ivano Toccaceli	DF	1990–1993	6	0	
63=	Ivan Bugli	MF	2000–2001	5	0	
63=	Massimo Ceccoli	MF	1990–1991	5	0	
63=	Leone Gasperoni	DF	1996–1997	5	0	
63=	Giampaolo Mazza	MF	1991	5	0	
63=	Marco Montironi	DF	1990–1991	5	0	
63=	Luciano Mularoni	MF	1996–2000	5	0	
63=	Claudio Peverani	MF	1994–1996	5	0	
70=	Gianluca Bollini	DF	2007	4	0	
70=	Giacomo Maiani	MF	2002–2005	4	0	
70=	Paolo Mariotti	MF	2006–2007	4	0	
70=	Mattia Masi	MF	2005–2006	4	0	
70=	Mirko Palazzi	MF	2005–2006	4	0	
70=	Danilo Rinaldi	MF	2008–2009	4	0	
76=	Simone Bianchi	MF	1996–1997	3	0	
76=	Luca Bonifazi	MF	2004–2007	3	0	
76=	Michele Ceccoli	GK	2005	3	0	
76=	Enrico Cibelli	MF	2006–2008	3	0	
80=	Alex Della Valle	DF	2010–2011	2	0	
80=	Gianluca Gatti	MF	1996–1997	2	0	
80=	Marco Macina	FW	1990	2	0	
80=	Cristian Negri	MF	2007	2	0	
80=	Alan Toccaceli	FW	2003–2007	2	0	
80=	Paolo Daniele Zanotti	DF	1990–1992	2	0	
86=	Giancarlo Bacciocchi	FW	1990	1	0	
86=	Luca Bizzocchi	DF	1992	1	0	
86=	Alessandro Casadei	DF	1996	1	0	
86=	Marco Casadei	FW	2009	1	0	
86=	Alberto Celli	MF	2006	1	0	
86=	Nicola Chiaruzzi	MF	2010	1	0	
86=	Paolo Conti	DF	1990	1	0	
86=	Andrea Moroni	FW	2011	1	0	
86=	Federico Moroni	DF	1995	1	0	
86=	Fabrizio Pelliccioni	DF	1999	1	0	
86=	Christian Selva	FW	2000	1	0	
86=	Marco Tomassoni	DF	1999	1	0	
