= Football at the 1987 Mediterranean Games – Men's team squads =

Below are the squads for the Football at the 1987 Mediterranean Games, hosted in Latakia, Syria, and took place between 15 and 25 September 1987.

== Group A ==
=== Algeria B ===
Coach:

No.	Pos.	Player	Date of birth (age)	Caps	Goals	Club
	GK	Larbi El Hadi	27 May 1961 (aged 26)			(Algerian Football Federation) Wydad de Boufarik
	DF	Kamel Adjas	22 August 1961 (aged 26)			(Algerian Football Federation) Entente de Sétif
	DF	Amar Bernaoui				(Algerian Football Federation) Entente de Sétif
	DF	Abderrazak Belgherbi	29 October 1961 (aged 25)			(Algerian Football Federation) Olympique de Chlef
	DF	Abdelkader Khodja				(Algerian Football Federation) Jeunesse de Belcourt
	MF	Abdelhakim Serrar	24 April 1961 (aged 26)			(Algerian Football Federation) Entente de Sétif
	MF	Boutkhil Benyoucef	20 April 1963 (aged 24)			(Algerian Football Federation) Mouloudia d'Oran
	MF	Nacer Mekidèche	24 November 1960 (aged 26)			(Algerian Football Federation) Jeunesse de Belcourt
	MF	Abdelkader Meziani	4 February 1957 (aged 30)			(Algerian Football Federation) Union d'El Harrach
	FW	Nacer Bouiche	16 May 1963 (aged 24)			(Algerian Football Federation) JS Tizi Ouzou

=== France B ===
Coach: Jack Braun

No.	Pos.	Player	Date of birth (age)	Caps	Goals	Club
	GK	Gilles Bourges	21 May 1963 (aged 24)			(French Football Federation) Stade Rennais
	DF	Stéphane Gilet	16 June 1964 (aged 23)			(French Football Federation) Quimper Cornouaille
	DF	Patrice Cabanel	10 July 1964 (aged 23)			(French Football Federation) Olympique Lyonnais
	DF	Pascal Mandart	10 February 1966 (aged 21)			(French Football Federation) Valenciennes
	DF	Frédéric Zago	12 August 1963 (aged 24)			(French Football Federation) Olympique Lyonnais
	MF	Noël Vidot	15 December 1962 (aged 24)			(French Football Federation) Nîmes Olympique
	MF	Jacky Colin	18 August 1963 (aged 24)			(French Football Federation) Sochaux
	MF	Éric Stéfanini	16 April 1963 (aged 24)			(French Football Federation) Nîmes Olympique
	FW	Philippe Gladines	19 August 1960 (aged 27)			(French Football Federation) Valenciennes
	FW	Victor da Silva	21 April 1962 (aged 25)			(French Football Federation) Olympique Alès
	FW	Philippe Prieur	3 June 1960 (aged 27)			(French Football Federation) SM Caen

=== Greece Ol. ===
Coach: Giorgos Petridis

No.	Pos.	Player	Date of birth (age)	Caps	Goals	Club
	GK	Christos Michail	28 February 1962 (aged 25)			(Hellenic Football Federation) AEL
	GK	Nikolaos Grigoriadis	11 June 1965 (aged 22)			(Hellenic Football Federation) Diagoras
	DF	Kostas Pozapalidis	24 August 1966 (aged 21)			(Hellenic Football Federation) Apollon Athens
	DF	Pagonis Vakalopoulos	24 January 1965 (aged 22)			(Hellenic Football Federation) Iraklis
	DF	Kostas Kolomitrousis	30 March 1964 (aged 23)			(Hellenic Football Federation) AEL
	DF	Petros Bontzos	27 February 1961 (aged 26)			(Hellenic Football Federation) Veria
	MF	Dimitrios Makrodimitris	10 January 1964 (aged 23)			(Hellenic Football Federation) Egaleo
	MF	Sakis Tsiolis	30 June 1959 (aged 28)			(Hellenic Football Federation) AEL
	MF	Aris Karasavvidis	16 May 1963 (aged 24)			(Hellenic Football Federation) PAOK
	MF	Panagiotis Tsalouchidis	30 March 1963 (aged 24)			(Hellenic Football Federation) Olympiacos
	MF	Takis Karagiozopoulos	4 February 1961 (aged 26)			(Hellenic Football Federation) AEK Athens
	FW	Apostolos Drakopoulos	11 December 1966 (aged 20)			(Hellenic Football Federation) Olympiacos
	FW	Kyriakos Bibisidis	23 June 1965 (aged 22)			(Hellenic Football Federation) Aris Thessaloniki
	FW	Apostolos Drakopoulos	11 December 1966 (aged 20)			(Hellenic Football Federation) Panachaiki
		Taftaridis				

=== Morocco Ol. ===
Coach:

No.	Pos.	Player	Date of birth (age)	Caps	Goals	Club
	GK	Khalil Azmi	23 August 1964 (aged 23)			(Royal Moroccan Football Federation) Wydad AC
	MF	Hassan Benabicha	15 April 1964 (aged 23)			(Royal Moroccan Football Federation) Wydad AC
	MF	Abdelmajid Dolmy	20 August 1953 (aged 34)			(Royal Moroccan Football Federation) Raja CA
	MF	Fadel Jilal	4 March 1964 (aged 23)			(Royal Moroccan Football Federation) Wydad AC
	MF	Moulay Hachem El Gharef	30 June 1965 (aged 22)			(Royal Moroccan Football Federation) Olympique Khouribga
	FW	Hassan Nader	8 July 1965 (aged 22)			(Royal Moroccan Football Federation) Wydad AC
	FW	Abderrahim Hamraoui	11 September 1960 (aged 27)			(Royal Moroccan Football Federation) Raja CA
	FW	Mustapha Kiddi	16 January 1964 (aged 23)			(Royal Moroccan Football Federation) KAC Marrakech
	FW	Mohammed Chaouch	12 December 1966 (aged 20)			(Royal Moroccan Football Federation) KAC Marrakech

== Group B ==
=== Lebanon ===
Coach: Adnan Al Sharqi

No.	Pos.	Player	Date of birth (age)	Caps	Goals	Club
	GK	Jihad Mahjoub				
	GK	Ali Rammal				
	DF	Khaled Bahlawan				
	DF	Ziad Itani				
	DF	Fouad Leila				
	DF	Wassef El Soufi				
	MF	Hassan Abboud				
	MF	Nasser Bakhti				
	MF	Marwan Kamareddine				
		Ibrahim Dhaini				
	FW	Bilal El Soufi				

=== San Marino ===
Coach: Giulio Casali

No.	Pos.	Player	Date of birth (age)	Caps	Goals	Club
	GK	Pierluigi Benedettini	18 August 1961 (aged 26)			(San Marino Football Federation) San Marino Calcio
	DF	Bruno Muccioli	7 August 1960 (aged 27)			(Italian Football Federation) Cattolica Calcio 1923 SG
	DF	William Guerra	24 February 1968 (aged 19)			(Italian Football Federation) AC Tropical Ospedaletto
	DF	Marco Montironi	10 November 1959 (aged 27)			(Italian Football Federation) AC Città di Castello
	DF	Massimo Zanotti	23 March 1964 (aged 23)			(Italian Football Federation) AC Tropical Ospedaletto
	MF	Agostino Filippi	4 September 1963 (aged 24)			(Italian Football Federation) US Tuscania
	MF	Marco Mazza	1 July 1963 (aged 24)			(Italian Football Federation) AC Isola Liri
	MF	Fabio Zanotti	23 October 1961 (aged 25)			(Italian Football Federation) AC Bellaria Igea Marina
	MF	Giampaolo Mazza	26 February 1956 (aged 31)			(San Marino Football Federation) San Marino Calcio
	MF	Marco Mularoni	23 October 1964 (aged 22)			(Italian Football Federation) AC Bellaria Igea Marina
	MF	Tiziano Giacobbi	17 October 1962 (aged 24)			(San Marino Football Federation) AC Juvenes/Dogana
	MF	Giuseppe Canini	18 October 1957 (aged 29)			(San Marino Football Federation)
	FW	Valdes Pasolini	3 June 1962 (aged 25)			(San Marino Football Federation) AC Juvenes/Dogana
	FW	Giancarlo Bacciocchi	28 May 1963 (aged 24)			(San Marino Football Federation) SS Cosmos
	FW	Paolo Mazza	27 October 1961 (aged 25)			
		Roberto Colonna				

=== Syria ===
Coach: (Soviet Union) Valeriy Yaremchenko

No.	Pos.	Player	Date of birth (age)	Caps	Goals	Club
	GK	Ahmad Eid Berakdar	1 May 1955 (aged 32)			(Syrian Football Association) Al-Karamah
	DF	Raghed Khalil				
	DF	Ammar Habib	25 October 1967 (aged 19)			(Syrian Football Association) Tishreen
	DF	Yousef Hawla				(Syrian Football Association) Tishreen
	DF	Joseph Leyous				(Syrian Football Association) Hurriya
	MF	Saad Saad				
	MF	Walid Abou El-Sel				(Syrian Football Association) Al-Jaish
	MF	George Khouri				(Syrian Football Association) Al-Jaish
	MF	Abdul Kader Kardaghli	1 January 1961 (aged 26)			(Syrian Football Association) Tishreen
	MF	Ahmad Darwish				
	FW	Nizar Mahrous	12 March 1963 (aged 24)			(Oman Football Association) Saham Club
	FW	Faisal Ahmad				
	FW	Hussein Deeb				(Syrian Football Association) Al-Majd
	FW	Walid Al-Nasser	18 June 1965 (aged 22)			(Syrian Football Association) Hurriya SC
		Ahmad Al Shaar				

=== Turkey B ===
Coach: Altan Tetik

No.	Pos.	Player	Date of birth (age)	Caps	Goals	Club
	GK	Müjdat Afşin	10 June 1955 (aged 32)			(Turkish Football Federation) Petrol Ofisi
	DF	Eyüp Taş	11 September 1959 (aged 28)			(Turkish Football Federation) Adana Demirspor
	DF	Fuat Akyüz	30 November 1959 (aged 27)			(Turkish Football Federation) Kocaelispor
	DF	Hamdi Aslan	6 September 1967 (aged 20)			(Turkish Football Federation) Trabzonspor
	DF	Nafiz Tural	16 December 1964 (aged 22)			(Turkish Football Federation) Şekerspor
	MF	Mehmet Özdilek	1 April 1966 (aged 21)			(Turkish Football Federation) Kahramanmaraşspor
	MF	Tuncay Toper	11 January 1967 (aged 20)			(Turkish Football Federation) Kuşadasıspor
	MF	Beyhan Çalışkan	6 April 1960 (aged 27)			(Turkish Football Federation) Bursaspor
	MF	Ümit Birol	26 January 1963 (aged 24)			(Turkish Football Federation) Adana Demirspor
	MF	Çetin İnsel	15 September 1964 (aged 23)			(Turkish Football Federation) Diyarbakırspor
	FW	Necati Karamırnak	23 December 1962 (aged 24)			(Turkish Football Federation) Yeni Salihlispor
	FW	Orhan Görsen	1 November 1958 (aged 28)			(Turkish Football Federation) Kocaelispor
	FW	Faruk Şahin	5 November 1966 (aged 20)			(Turkish Football Federation) Beşiktaş
	FW	Mahmut Aydın	4 February 1964 (aged 23)			(Turkish Football Federation) Bakırköyspor
	FW	Serdar Yılmaz	10 October 1964 (aged 22)			(Turkish Football Federation) Aydınspor
