= Gasperoni =

Gasperoni is a surname. Notable people with the surname include:

- Alex Gasperoni (born 1984), Sammarinese footballer
- Bryan Gasperoni (born 1974), Sammarinese footballer
- Cesare Gasperoni (born 1944), Captain Regent of San Marino
- Cristian Gasperoni (born 1970), Italian former cyclist
- Elio Gasperoni (born 1943), Sammarinese sports shooter
- Ermenegildo Gasperoni (1906–1994), Sammarinese politician
- Federico Gasperoni (born 1976), Sammarinese footballer and cyclist
- Jason Gasperoni (born 1973), Sammarinese alpine skier
- Lorenzo Gasperoni (born 1990), Sammarinese footballer
- Milena Gasperoni (born 1961), Sammarinese politician
