= Benedettini =

Benedetti may refer to:

- Elia Benedettini (born 22 June 1995), Sammarinese footballer who currently plays for Novara Calcio and the San Marino national football team
- Ernesto Benedettini (born 5 March 1948), Sammarinese politician
- Giacomo Benedettini (born 7 October 1982), Sammarinese footballer who currently plays for S.P. Tre Fiori and the San Marino national football team
- Pierluigi Benedettini (born August 18, 1961 in Murata), retired Sammarinese footballer who played as a goalkeeper
