= Simone Benedettini =

Sammarinese footballer

Personal information
- Full name: Simone Benedettini
- Date of birth: 21 January 1997 (age 29)
- Place of birth: San Marino, San Marino
- Height: 1.91 m (6 ft 3 in)
- Position: Goalkeeper

Team information
- Current team: Fiorentino
- Number: 13

Youth career
- –2015: San Marino Calcio
- 2015–2017: Modena

Senior career*
Years	Team	Apps	(Gls)
2016–2017	→ Pianese (loan)	24	(0)
2017–2018	Sammaurese	0	(0)
2018–2020	Cattalico Calcio San Marino	12	(0)
2020–2022	Murata	40	(0)
2022–2023	Pennarossa	23	(0)
2023–	Fiorentino	84	(0)

International career^{‡}
2014–2015	San Marino U19	5	(0)
2015–2016	San Marino U21	1	(0)
2019–	San Marino	9	(0)
- * Club domestic league appearances and goals as of 5 June 2026 ‡ National team caps and goals as of 14 April 2023

Simone Benedettini (born 21 January 1997) is a Sanmarinese footballer who plays as a goalkeeper for Sanmarinese club Fiorentino. He is the son of former International goalkeeper Pierluigi (29 caps between March 1986 and June 1995).

== Early career ==
Benedettini was born in San Marino, and began his career in the youth teams of local club side San Marino Calcio. In 2015, he was signed by Serie B side Modena, again to play in their youth sector.

=== Loan moves ===
After impressing in the Beretti (under 19) team, where he kept sevenclean sheets in 25 appearances, Benedettini was loaned to Serie D side Pianese in order to gain professional match experience. He made his debut for the Tuscan side on 4 September 2016, in a 1–2 loss to Correggese. His first clean sheet came in his sixth match; a 1–0 win over Delta Rovigo. He was demoted to the bench after a 2–6 loss to Mezzolara, despite playing fifteen consecutive matches for Pianese and being on the losing side just once in the last seven games previously.

In December 2017, Benedettini would transfer to A.C. Sammaurese, before moving to San Marino Calcio in the summer of 2018, and eventually Murata in January 2020.

== International career ==
Benedettini was first involved in the San Marino national setup when he was called up to the under-19 side aged just 17 in 2014. He made his national debut in a 0–4 loss against Serbia, in UEFA under-19 Championship qualification. He was made captain in his final two games at under-19 level, in qualification for the 2016 edition of the same tournament, playing in 0-9 and 0-1 losses to Belgium and Sweden respectively, before being dropped for the final group game against Belarus, an eventual 1–6 loss. He played once for the under-21 side, a 0–4 loss to Georgia, in qualification for the UEFA European Under-21 Championship. Manager of the full national side, Pierangelo Manzaroli, called Benedettini into the squad for the 2018 World Cup qualification match against Germany. The young goalkeeper remained an unused substitute as La Serenissima succumbed to an 0–8 defeat.

Benedettini made his senior team debut in the 0-4 Euro 2020 qualifier loss against Belgium on 6 September 2019, stepping in for San Marino's normal starter, his cousin Elia, who was injured.

== Personal life ==
Benedettini works as a mechanic with his dad and uncle in a bus station. Sometimes he even drives the buses himself.
