= Reactions to the Gezi Park protests =

The AKP government's handling of the 2013–14 protests in Turkey has been roundly criticized by other nations and international organizations, including the European Union, the United Nations, the United States, the UK, and Germany.

== Supranational organizations ==
- European Union – The European Commission condemned "all excessive and disproportionate use of force." EU Enlargement Commissioner Stefan Fuele said that Turkey must investigate the excessive use of force by police against anti-government protesters. The European Parliament passed a resolution on 13 June warning against the use of harsh measures against peaceful protesters, adding that those responsible for the police violence must be brought to justice, detained peaceful protestors immediately released and the victims compensated. While the resolution welcomed the moderate response to the protests by President Abdullah Gül and the apologies by Deputy Prime Minister Bülent Arinç, it deplored the unwillingness of the Turkish government and Erdoğan to take steps towards reconciliation, to apologize and to understand the reactions of a segment of the Turkish population.
- United Nations – The UN expressed concern over reports of excessive use of force by law enforcement officers against protestors in Turkey. According to the UN Human Rights Office Chief Navi Pillay, "the excessive force used by the police has led to the broadening of protests to include other aspects of governance, fundamental human rights, freedom of assembly and freedom of opinion and expression".

== Countries ==
- Austria – Vice-Chancellor and Foreign Minister Michael Spindelegger expressed his concern about the approach of the Turkish government, saying, "Turkish security forces have shown a shocking level of intimidation and violence against the demonstrators who are mostly peaceful. The Turkish Government must make every effort to ensure appropriate conduct of security forces, respect for human rights and protection of fundamental and civil rights." He also cautioned against criminalising the protests simply because a minority were rioters, stating that "Austria and the EU condemn any form of violence – violence on the part of the protesters included. The allegations made by Turkish politicians recently, however, that the protesters were agitators or even terrorists, are not conducive to de-escalation and represent yet another blow against the respect of freedom of expression."
- France – Foreign Affairs Minister Laurent Fabius assured that "Paris is hoping for calm and restraint" in Turkey, adding that "in democracy, dialogue is a must. This is what [Turkish] president Abdullah Gul called for and what I hope will be implemented".
- Germany – Chancellor Angela Merkel said on 17 June that she was "shocked, like many other people" by the images of police and protesters clashing in Turkey. "There were some terrible images, in which one could see that, in my view, too hard a line is being taken" Merkel stated in an interview broadcast on RTL Television before her departure for the 2013 G8 summit. "What's happening in Turkey at the moment does not in my view reflect our understanding of a freedom to demonstrate, freedom to express an opinion." Foreign Minister Guido Westerwelle issued a statement saying that "The Turkish government is sending the wrong message to the country and to Europe with its response to date to the protests. We expect Prime Minister Erdoğan to deescalate the situation, in the spirit of European values, and to seek a constructive exchange and peaceful dialogue" he added, stating that "The images from Taksim Square are disturbing". Ambassadors to both countries were summoned by the respective host foreign ministries over Germany's condemnation of the crackdown.
- Hungary – Prime Minister Viktor Orbán said during an interview, "We wish the Turkish government good luck on stabilising the situation and to be able to continue the work that it has started (and had become one of the most successful country of Europe in the last years)."
- Iran – Foreign Ministry Spokesman Abbas Araghchi said that the protests are an internal matter for Turkey to resolve.
- Iraq – Prime Minister Nouri al-Maliki affirmed on his website that his government was worried about the security implications of the situation, saying, "We believe that resorting to violence will widen the circle [of violence]...in the region, and we call for restraint."
- Italy – Minister of Foreign Affairs Emma Bonino told the Italian Chamber of Deputies that "the unnacceptable use of force and the arrest of 20 lawyers are not acceptable. The right to non-violent protest is a vital pillar of democracy". She added that "the use of force is an expression of weakness" and underscored that "free elections do not in themselves mean democracy. Turkey must decide if it wants to become a mature democracy". Finally, the minister added that "A 'graduation exam' for the Turkish government is taking place in the square and streets...This is perhaps the first serious test of the soundness of Turkey's democracy and its European accession process.".
- Malaysia – Malaysian government announced on 10 June that if violence continued for much longer all Malaysian citizens may be withdrawn from Turkey, with at least 93 nationals in the country (17 of them students), most of them in Istanbul.
- Netherlands – Foreign Minister Frans Timmermans said on 3 June he regretted the excessive police force used against protesters, and voiced support for some of concerns of the demonstrators concerning freedom of speech and media.
- Romania – The international press associated the nationwide protests in Romania with the prologue of Turkish protests.
- Spain – Foreign Minister José García-Margallo y Marfil requested that the European Union do not "try to give lessons" on what to do to resolve the situation and offered the "understanding" and "help" of Spain to that "friendly country".
- Syria – Information Minister Omran Zoubi criticized Tayyip Erdoğan's way of dealing with the mass protests in Turkey, stating: "The oppression of Turkish Prime Minister Erdoğan against nonviolent demonstrations is something that is unrealistic and reveals that he is detached from reality" Finally, he added "If Erdoğan is unable to pursue non-violent means, he should resign." The Syrian Foreign Ministry issued a travel warning advising Syrian citizens to "avoid travel to Turkey for their own safety because of a deterioration in the security situation in a number of Turkish cities,...and the violence of Erdoğan's government against peaceful protesters".
- United Kingdom – The Foreign Office condemned the 'indiscriminate' use of tear gas, adding "We encourage the Turkish authorities to respect the right to peaceful protest and freedom of assembly, which are fundamental human rights in any democratic society."
- United States – State Department Spokesperson Jennifer Psaki expressed concern: "We believe that Turkey's long-term stability, security and prosperity is best guaranteed by upholding the fundamental freedoms of expression, assembly and association, which is what it seems these individuals were doing." United States Secretary of State John Kerry said the U.S. was following the situation closely and was troubled by the reports of excessive force by the police. He also added that his government is "deeply concerned" by the large number of people who have been injured.

== Prominent individuals, political parties, and groups ==
- Linguist Noam Chomsky condemned the Gezi Park crackdown, stating it "recalls the most shameful moments of Turkish history."
- Slovene philosopher Slavoj Žižek delivered his support to the protesters through Bülent Somay who is a member of the Revolutionary Socialist Workers' Party.
- Entertainer Madonna posted her support to the protesters on her Instagram account, while British actress Tilda Swinton, American musician Moby, American actor Josh Duhamel, Australian model Miranda Kerr, and comedian actor Russell Brand also expressed their support. Ukrainian feminist group FEMEN released a video calling on Turkish women to stand up for their rights via protests.
- Writer Neil Gaiman wished the protesters luck and safety in his blog.
- Former Pink Floyd member Roger Waters posted his solidarity with the protesters on a Facebook page called Roger Waters The Wall. During his "The Wall Live" concert in Istanbul on 4 August 2013, he expressed his support one more time and offered condolences to the protesters in Turkish projecting the pictures of the people killed during the protests in the background.
- Folk singer Joan Baez delivered her solidarity stating as "Your voice has been heard everywhere, and I am greeting you now." during a concert in Fairfax, Virginia.
- Radiohead frontman Thom Yorke posted news supporting the protesters on his Facebook page
- Massive Attack posted an ad that is to appear on The New York Times, crowd-funded by concerned individuals throughout the world.
- Actor & musician Jared Leto (Thirty Seconds to Mars) also supported the Turkish youth from his Twitter account.
- The International Trade Union Confederation called for members to support the online campaign on LabourStart demanding that the police violence end, protestors be released, and so on. 6,000 union members supported the campaign in its first 24 hours online.
- Gianluca Bollini and Fabio Bollini who are San Marino national football team players supported Turkey from their Twitter accounts.
- American singer-songwriter, poet and visual artist Patti Smith showed her support by an interview.
- New York & Berlin-based publisher Contra Mundum Press expressed their support through posting a text written by the Editors' Platform in Turkey in English, French, Italian, and the original Turkish.
- Some female members of the Italian parliament dressed in red to support the "woman in red" that has come to embody the peaceful protests.
- One or more members of Beirut were in Taksim Square when the "Standing Man" protests happened. They also tweeted pictures from the square and said : "So happy to be in Istanbul right now" from the band's Twitter account.
- On 24 July 30 academics and celebrities, including Oscar-winning Susan Sarandon, Sean Penn, Branko Lustig, Sir Ben Kingsley, Sir Tom Stoppard, as well as acclaimed Turkish pianist Fazıl Say, published a signed open letter to Turkish Prime Minister on the British daily The Times, in which they condemned the crackdown on anti-government protesters and compared giant pro-government rallies organized by Erdoğan to the Nazi rallies staged in Nuremberg to support Adolf Hitler. In response, Erdoğan has threatened legal action against the 30 signatories and the newspaper.
- On 4 June 2013, in the Piazza Verdi square of Bologna, Italy, a university collective called "Collettivo Universitario Autonomo – CUA" (Autonomous University Collective) planted a photinia to show solidarity. At the bottom of the tree, they placed a plaque which was written the Italian translation of a Nazim Hikmet poem; "The C major Concerto of Sebastian Bach" on and a wall in the square was covered in graffiti with a quote from the poem.

On 15 October 2013, during the protests against the austerity measures of the Italian government and to re-plant the tree which was removed by the Municipality of Bologna in September 2013, the collective entered an abandoned building in the Zanolini street and named it "Studentato Occupato Taksim" (Taksim Student Occupation).
