= Muccioli =

Muccioli is an Italian surname. Notable people with the surname include:

- Anna Maria Muccioli (born 1964), Sammarinese politician
- Claudio Muccioli (born 1958), Sammarinese politician
- Dalia Muccioli (born 1993), Italian cyclist
- Giulio Muccioli (born 1978), pharmacologist and bioanalyst
- Riccardo Muccioli (born 1974), Sammarinese footballer
- Simona Muccioli (born 1984), Sammarinese swimmer
