= Bollini =

Bollini is an Italian and Telugu surname. Notable people with the surname include:

- Bollini Munuswamy Naidu (1885–1935), colonial Indian politician
- Fabio Bollini (born 1983), Sammarinese footballer
- Francisco Bollini (born 1888, date of death unknown), Argentine fencer
- Germano Bollini (born 1951), Sammarinese sport shooter
- Gianluca Bollini (born 1980), Sammarinese footballer
- Paolo Bollini (born 1960), politician in San Marino (San Marinese Socialist Part)
- Pascal Bollini (born 1966), former professional footballer
