= Coppini =

Coppini is a surname. Notable people with the surname include:

- Aquilino Coppini (died 1629), Italian musician and lyricist
- Enzo Coppini (1920–2011), Italian racing cyclist
- Fausto Eliseo Coppini (1870–1945), Italian-Argentine painter
- Francesco Coppini, Bishop of Terni from 1458 to 1462
- Germán Coppini (1961–2013), Spanish singer-songwriter
- Matteo Coppini (born 1989), Sammarinese footballer
- Pompeo Coppini (1870–1957), Italian-American sculptor
