= Sweden men's national football team results (2010–2019) =

- Win Draw Loss

This is a list of the men's Sweden national football team results (2010–2019).

== List of matches ==
=== 2010 ===
20 January International Friendly	Oman	0–1	Sweden	Seeb, Oman
19:30 UTC+3		Report	Svensson 35'	Stadium: Seeb Stadium; Attendance: 1,000; Referee: Nawaf Shukr Allah (Bahrain)

23 January International Friendly	Syria	1–1	Sweden	Damascus, Syria
15:00 UTC+3	Rafe 5'	Report	Ranégie 87'	Stadium: Abbasiyyin Stadium; Attendance: 10,000; Referee: Talaam Najm (Lebanon)

3 March International Friendly	Wales	0–1	Sweden	Swansea, Wales
19:45 UTC+0		Report	Elmander 44'	Stadium: Liberty Stadium; Attendance: 8,258; Referee: Alan Black (Northern Ireland)

29 May International Friendly	Sweden	4–2	Bosnia and Herzegovina	Solna, Sweden
19:00 UTC+2	Toivonen 44'; Olsson 68', 83'; Berg 90+2'	Report	Salihović 47'; Zec 90'	Stadium: Råsunda Stadium; Attendance: 22,589; Referee: Manuel Gräfe (Germany)

2 June International Friendly	Belarus	0–1	Sweden	Minsk, Belarus
20:30 UTC+3		Report	Wilhelmsson 47'	Stadium: Dinamo Stadium; Attendance: 12,000; Referee: Aleksey Nikolaev (Russia)

11 August International Friendly	Sweden	3–0	Scotland	Solna, Sweden
20:00 UTC+2	Ibrahimović 4'; Bajrami 39'; Toivonen 56'	Report		Stadium: Råsunda Stadium; Attendance: 25,249; Referee: Gianluca Rocchi (Italy)

3 September UEFA Euro 2012 qualifying	Sweden	2–0	Hungary	Solna, Sweden
20:00 UTC+2	Wernbloom 51', 73'	Report		Stadium: Råsunda Stadium; Attendance: 32,304; Referee: Martin Atkinson (England)

7 September UEFA Euro 2012 qualifying	Sweden	6–0	San Marino	Malmö, Sweden
20:00 UTC+2	Ibrahimović 7', 77'; D. Simoncini 12' (o.g.); A. Simoncini 26' (o.g.); Granqvist 51'; Berg 90+3'	Report		Stadium: Swedbank Stadion; Attendance: 21,083; Referee: David McKeon (Ireland)

12 October UEFA Euro 2012 qualifying	Netherlands	4–1	Sweden	Amsterdam, Netherlands
20:30 UTC+2	Huntelaar 4', 55'; Afellay 37', 59'	Report	Granqvist 69'	Stadium: Amsterdam Arena; Attendance: 46,000; Referee: Stéphane Lannoy (France)

17 November International Friendly	Sweden	0–0	Germany	Gothenburg, Sweden
20:30 UTC+1		Report		Stadium: Ullevi; Attendance: 21,959; Referee: Carlos Velasco Carballo (Spain)

=== 2011 ===
19 January International Friendly	Botswana	1–2	Sweden	Cape Town, South Africa
17:00 UTC+2	Mogorosi 47'	Report	Gerndt 31'; Svensson 74'	Stadium: Cape Town Stadium; Attendance: 2,000; Referee: Victor Hlungwani (South Africa)

22 January Unofficial Match	South Africa Development	1–1	Sweden	Mbombela, South Africa
17:00 UTC+2	Mabunda 10'	Report	Hysén 30'	Stadium: Mbombela Stadium; Referee: Gabriel Sekopo (South Africa)

8 February 2011 Cyprus Tournament semi-final	Cyprus	0–2	Sweden	Nicosia, Cyprus
19:00 UTC+2		Report	Hysén 26'; Berg 45+1'	Stadium: GSP Stadium; Attendance: 2,000; Referee: Alexandru Tudor (Romania)

9 February 2011 Cyprus Tournament final	Sweden	1–1 (4–5 p)	Ukraine	Nicosia, Cyprus
20:30 UTC+2	Elmander 7'	Report	Devich 20' (pen.)	Stadium: GSP Stadium; Attendance: 2,000; Referee: Leontios Trattou (Cyprus)

29 March UEFA Euro 2012 qualifying	Sweden	2–1	Moldova	Solna, Sweden
19:00 UTC+2	Lustig 30'; Larsson 81'	Report	Suvorov 90+2'	Stadium: Råsunda Stadium; Attendance: 25,544; Referee: Knut Kircher (Germany)

3 June UEFA Euro 2012 qualifying	Moldova	1–4	Sweden	Chișinău, Moldova
21:30 UTC+3	Bugaiov 61'	Report	Toivonen 11'; Elmander 30', 58'; Genrdt 88'	Stadium: Zimbru Stadium; Attendance: 10,500; Referee: Andre Marriner (England)

7 June UEFA Euro 2012 qualifying	Sweden	5–0	Finland	Solna, Sweden
20:00 UTC+2	Källström 11'; Ibrahimović 31', 35', 53'; Bajrami 83'	Report		Stadium: Råsunda Stadium; Attendance: 32,128; Referee: Antony Gautier (France)

10 August International Friendly	Ukraine	0–1	Sweden	Kharkiv, Ukraine
21:00 UTC+3		Report	Hysén 90+2'	Stadium: Metalist Stadium; Attendance: 27,102; Referee: Paolo Tagliavento (Italy)

2 September UEFA Euro 2012 qualifying	Hungary	2–1	Sweden	Budapest, Hungary
19:45 UTC+2	Szabics 44'; Rudolf 90'	Report	Wilhelmsson 60'	Stadium: Puskás Ferenc Stadium; Attendance: 26,000; Referee: Damir Skomina (Slovenia)

6 September UEFA Euro 2012 qualifying	San Marino	0–5	Sweden	Serravalle, San Marino
20:30 UTC+2		Report	Källström 64'; Wilhelmsson 70', 90+3'; Olsson 81'; Hysén 88'	Stadium: Stadio Olimpico; Attendance: 2,946; Referee: Steven McLean (Scotland)

7 October UEFA Euro 2012 qualifying	Finland	1–2	Sweden	Helsinki, Finland
19:15 UTC+3	Toivio 73'	Report	Larsson 8'; Olsson 52'	Stadium: Helsinki Olympic Stadium; Attendance: 23,257; Referee: Mark Clattenburg (England)

11 October UEFA Euro 2012 qualifying	Sweden	3–2	Netherlands	Solna, Sweden
20:15 UTC+2	Källström 14'; Larsson 52' (pen.); Toivonen 53'	Report	Huntelaar 22'; Kuyt 50'	Stadium: Råsunda Stadium; Attendance: 33,069; Referee: Cüneyt Çakır (Turkey)

11 November International Friendly	Denmark	2–0	Sweden	Copenhagen, Denmark
19:00 UTC+1	Bendtner 35'; Krohn-Dehli 80'	Report		Stadium: Parken Stadium; Attendance: 18,057; Referee: Svein Oddvar Moen (Norway)

15 November International Friendly	England	1–0	Sweden	London, England
20:00 UTC+0	Barry 22'	Report		Stadium: Wembley Stadium; Attendance: 48,876; Referee: Pavel Královec (Czech Republic)

=== 2012 ===
18 January International Friendly	Sweden	2–0	Bahrain	Doha, Qatar
19:00 UTC+3	Hysén 58' (pen.); Hiljemark 81'	Report		Stadium: Al Gharafa Stadium; Attendance: 100; Referee: Banjar Al Dosari (Qatar)

23 January International Friendly	Qatar U23	0–5	Sweden	Doha, Qatar
16:00 UTC+3		Report	Durmaz 50'; Claesson 60'; Hysén 69', 90+2'; Thern 84'	Stadium: Jassim Bin Hamad Stadium; Attendance: 200; Referee: Ali Sabah Adday Al-Qaysi (Iraq)

29 February International Friendly	Croatia	1–3	Sweden	Zagreb, Croatia
20:30 UTC+1	Olsson 44' (o.g.)	Report	Ibrahimović 13' (pen.); Larsson 47', 69'	Stadium: Maksimir Stadium; Attendance: 7,000; Referee: Mitja Zganec (Slovenia)

30 May International Friendly	Sweden	3–2	Iceland	Gothenburg, Sweden
20:15 UTC+2	Ibrahimović 2'; Toivonen 14'; Wilhelmsson 77'	Report	Sigþórsson 27'; Jónasson 90+4'	Stadium: Gamla Ullevi; Attendance: 14,379; Referee: Peter Rasmussen (Denmark)

5 June International Friendly	Sweden	2–1	Serbia	Solna, Sweden
19:00 UTC+2	Toivonen 23'; Ibrahimović 52' (pen.)	Report	Subotić 27'	Stadium: Råsunda Stadium; Attendance: 20,691; Referee: Felix Brych (Germany)

11 June UEFA Euro 2012 Group D	Ukraine	2–1	Sweden	Kyiv, Ukraine
21:45 UTC+3	Shevchenko 55', 62'	Report	Ibrahimović 52'	Stadium: NSC Olympiyskiy Stadium; Attendance: 64,290; Referee: Cüneyt Çakır (Turkey)

15 June UEFA Euro 2012 Group D	Sweden	2–3	England	Kyiv, Ukraine
21:45 UTC+3	Johnson 49' (o.g.); Mellberg 59'	Report	Carroll 23'; Walcott 64'; Welbeck 78'	Stadium: NSC Olympiyskiy Stadium; Attendance: 64,640; Referee: Damir Skomina (Slovenia)

19 June UEFA Euro 2012 Group D	Sweden	2–0	France	Kyiv, Ukraine
21:45 UTC+3	Ibrahimović 54'; Larsson 90+1'	Report		Stadium: NSC Olympiyskiy Stadium; Attendance: 63,010; Referee: Pedro Proença (Portugal)

15 August International Friendly	Sweden	0–3	Brazil	Solna, Sweden
20:00 UTC+2		Report	Leandro Damião 32'; Pato 84', 86' (pen.)	Stadium: Råsunda Stadium; Attendance: 32,781; Referee: Viktor Kassai (Hungary)

6 September International Friendly	Sweden	1–0	China	Helsingborg, Sweden
19:00 UTC+2	Elmander 47'	Report		Stadium: Olympia; Attendance: 9,073; Referee: Mattias Gestranius (Finland)

11 September 2014 FIFA World Cup qualification	Sweden	2–0	Kazakhstan	Malmö, Sweden
20:30 UTC+2	Elm 37'; Berg 90+4'	Report		Stadium: Swedbank Stadion; Attendance: 20,414; Referee: Serhiy Boiko (Ukraine)

12 October 2014 FIFA World Cup qualification	Faroe Islands	1–2	Sweden	Tórshavn, Faroe Islands
17:00 UTC+1	Baldvinsson 57'	Report	Kačaniklić 65'; Ibrahimović 75'	Stadium: Tórsvøllur; Attendance: 5,079; Referee: Anastosios Sidiropoulos (Greece)

16 October 2014 FIFA World Cup qualification	Germany	4–4	Sweden	Berlin, Germany
20:45 UTC+2	Klose 8', 15'; Mertesacker 39'; Özil 56'	Report	Ibrahimović 62'; Lustig 64'; Elmander 76'; Elm 90+3'	Stadium: Olympiastadion; Attendance: 72,369; Referee: Pedro Proença (Portugal)

14 November International Friendly	Sweden	4–2	England	Solna, Sweden
20:30 UTC+1	Ibrahimović 20', 77', 84', 90+1'	Report	Welbeck 35'; Caulker 38'	Stadium: Friends Arena; Attendance: 49,967; Referee: Svein Oddvar Moen (Norway)

=== 2013 ===
23 January 2013 King's Cup Semi final	Sweden	1–1 (4–1 p)	North Korea	Chiang Mai, Thailand
17:00 UTC+7	Fejzullahu 56'	Report	Hong Kum-song 48'	Stadium: 700th Anniversary Stadium; Attendance: 500; Referee: Mongkolchai Pechsri (Thailand)
	Penalties
	Svensson (penalty scored); Majstorović (penalty scored); Hysén (penalty scored); P. Jansson (penalty scored)		(penalty missed) Jang Kuk-chol; (penalty missed) Kang Kuk-chol; (penalty scored) Kim Chol-bom

26 January 2013 King's Cup Final	Sweden	3–0	Finland	Chiang Mai, Thailand
17:00 UTC+7	Hysén 23'; Quaison 73'; Svensson 90'	Report		Stadium: 700th Anniversary Stadium; Attendance: 5,000; Referee: Chaiya Mahapab (Thailand)

6 February International Friendly	Sweden	2–3	Argentina	Solna, Sweden
20:30 UTC+1	Olsson 17'; Elm 90+5'	Report	Lustig 3' (o.g.); Agüero 19'; Higuaín 23'	Stadium: Friends Arena; Attendance: 49,646; Referee: Antony Gautier (France)

22 March 2014 FIFA World Cup qualification	Sweden	0–0	Republic of Ireland	Solna, Sweden
20:45 UTC+1		Report		Stadium: Friends Arena; Attendance: 49,436; Referee: Alberto Undiano Mallenco (Spain)

26 March International Friendly	Slovakia	0–0	Sweden	Žilina, Slovakia
20:15 UTC+1		Report		Stadium: Štadión pod Dubňom; Attendance: 3,100; Referee: Gerhard Grobelnik (Austria)

3 June International Friendly	Sweden	1–0	Macedonia	Malmö, Sweden
19:00 UTC+2	Kačaniklić 39'	Report		Stadium: Swedbank Stadion; Attendance: 14,459; Referee: Pavel Královec (Czech Republic)

7 June 2014 FIFA World Cup qualification	Austria	2–1	Sweden	Vienna, Austria
20:45 UTC+2	Alaba 26' (pen.); Janko 32'	Report	Elmander 82'	Stadium: Ernst-Happel-Stadion; Attendance: 48,500; Referee: Gianluca Rocchi (Italy)

11 June 2014 FIFA World Cup qualification	Sweden	2–0	Faroe Islands	Solna, Sweden
19:15 UTC+2	Ibrahimović 35', 82' (pen.)	Report		Stadium: Friends Arena; Attendance: 32,858; Referee: Nikolay Yordanov (Bulgaria)

14 August International Friendly	Sweden	4–2	Norway	Solna, Sweden
20:00 UTC+2	Ibrahimović 2', 28', 57'; Svensson 75'	Report	Abdellaoue 38' (pen.); Johansen 43'	Stadium: Friends Arena; Attendance: 13,438; Referee: Michael Oliver (England)

6 September 2014 FIFA World Cup qualification	Republic of Ireland	1–2	Sweden	Dublin, Ireland
19:45 UTC+1	Keane 22'	Report	Elmander 33'; Svensson 57'	Stadium: Aviva Stadium; Attendance: 49,500; Referee: Damir Skomina (Slovenia)

10 September 2014 FIFA World Cup qualification	Kazakhstan	0–1	Sweden	Astana, Kazakhstan
22:00 UTC+6		Report	Ibrahimović 1'	Stadium: Astana Arena; Attendance: 24,000; Referee: Miroslav Zelinka (Czech Republic)

11 October 2014 FIFA World Cup qualification	Sweden	2–1	Austria	Solna, Sweden
20:45 UTC+2	Olsson 56'; Ibrahimović 86'	Report	Harnik 29'	Stadium: Friends Arena; Attendance: 49,416; Referee: Cüneyt Çakır (Turkey)

15 October 2014 FIFA World Cup qualification	Sweden	3–5	Germany	Solna, Sweden
20:45 UTC+2	Hysén 6', 69'; Kačaniklić 42'	Report	Özil 45'; Götze 53'; Schürrle 57', 66', 76'	Stadium: Friends Arena; Attendance: 49,251; Referee: William Collum (Scotland)

15 November 2014 FIFA World Cup qualification play-offs	Portugal	1–0	Sweden	Lisbon, Portugal
19:45 UTC+0	Ronaldo 82'	Report		Stadium: Estádio da Luz; Attendance: 61,467; Referee: Nicola Rizzoli (Italy)

19 November 2014 FIFA World Cup qualification play-offs	Sweden	2–3 (2–4 agg.)	Portugal	Solna, Sweden
20:45 UTC+1	Ibrahimović 68', 72'	Report	Ronaldo 50', 77', 79'	Stadium: Friends Arena; Attendance: 49,766; Referee: Howard Webb (England)

=== 2014 ===
17 January International Friendly	Moldova	1–2	Sweden	Abu Dhabi, United Arab Emirates
20:00 (UTC+4)	Luvannor 45'	Report	Fejzullahu 76', 86'	Stadium: Mohammad Bin Zayed Stadium; Attendance: 120; Referee: Jameel Juma (Bahrain)

21 January International Friendly	Iceland	0–2	Sweden	Abu Dhabi, United Arab Emirates
20:00 (UTC+4)		Report	Quaison 33'; Molins 62'	Stadium: Mohammad Bin Zayed Stadium; Attendance: 100; Referee: Al Awaji Marai (Saudi Arabia)

5 March International Friendly	Turkey	2–1	Sweden	Ankara, Turkey
20:30 (UTC+2)	Erdinç 2'; Adın 57'	Report	Toivonen 54'	Stadium: 19 Mayıs Stadium; Attendance: 19,200; Referee: Milorad Mažić (Serbia)

28 May International Friendly	Denmark	1–0	Sweden	Copenhagen, Denmark
20:15 (UTC+2)	Agger 90+3' (pen.)	Report		Stadium: Parken Stadium; Attendance: 27,872; Referee: Svein Oddvar Moen (Norway)

1 June International Friendly	Sweden	0–2	Belgium	Solna, Sweden
20:30 (UTC+2)		Report	Lukaku 34'; Hazard 78'	Stadium: Friends Arena; Attendance: 24,732; Referee: Mark Clattenburg (England)

4 September International Friendly	Sweden	2–0	Estonia	Solna, Sweden
19:45 (UTC+2)	Ibrahimović 3', 24'	Report		Stadium: Friends Arena; Attendance: 15,421; Referee: Kristinn Jakobsson (Iceland)

8 September UEFA Euro 2016 qualifying	Austria	1–1	Sweden	Vienna, Austria
20:45 (UTC+2)	Alaba 7' (pen.)	Report	Zengin 12'	Stadium: Ernst-Happel-Stadion; Attendance: 48,500; Referee: Pavel Královec (Czech Republic)

9 October UEFA Euro 2016 qualifying	Sweden	1–1	Russia	Solna, Sweden
20:45 (UTC+2)	Toivonen 48'	Report	Kokorin 10'	Stadium: Friends Arena; Attendance: 49,023; Referee: Nicola Rizzoli (Italy)

12 October UEFA Euro 2016 qualifying	Sweden	2–0	Liechtenstein	Solna, Sweden
20:45 (UTC+2)	Zengin 34'; Durmaz 46'	Report		Stadium: Friends Arena; Attendance: 22,528; Referee: Gediminas Mažeika (Lithuania)

15 November UEFA Euro 2016 qualifying	Montenegro	1–1	Sweden	Podgorica, Montenegro
20:45 (UTC+1)	Jovetić 80' (pen.)	Report	Ibrahimović 9'	Stadium: Stadion pod Goricom; Attendance: 10,538; Referee: Willie Collum (Scotland)

18 November International Friendly	France	1–0	Sweden	Marseille, France
21:00 (UTC+1)	Varane 83'	Report		Stadium: Stade Vélodrome; Attendance: 55,000; Referee: Jesús Gil Manzano (Spain)

=== 2015 ===
15 January International Friendly	Sweden	2–0	Ivory Coast	Abu Dhabi, United Arab Emirates
21:30 (UTC+4)	Mårtensson 65'; Rohdén 86'	Report		Stadium: Mohammed bin Zayed Stadium; Attendance: 300; Referee: Yacoub Al Hammadi (United Arab Emirates)

19 January International Friendly	Sweden	0–1	Finland	Abu Dhabi, United Arab Emirates
22:30 (UTC+4)		Report	Riski 63'	Stadium: Mohammed bin Zayed Stadium; Attendance: 100; Referee: Omar Al Ali (United Arab Emirates)

27 March UEFA Euro 2016 qualifying	Moldova	0–2	Sweden	Chișinău, Moldova
20:45 (UTC+2)		Report	Ibrahimović 46', 84' (pen.)	Stadium: Zimbru Stadium; Attendance: 10,375; Referee: Ivan Bebek (Croatia)

31 March International Friendly	Sweden	3–1	Iran	Solna, Sweden
19:30 (UTC+2)	Ibrahimović 11'; Berg 21'; Toivonen 89'	Report	Nekounam 24' (pen.)	Stadium: Friends Arena; Attendance: 33,773; Referee: Serdar Gözübüyük (Netherlands)

8 June International Friendly	Norway	0–0	Sweden	Oslo, Norway
20:00 (UTC+2)		Report		Stadium: Ullevaal Stadion; Attendance: 26,659; Referee: Anthony Taylor (England)

14 June UEFA Euro 2016 qualifying	Sweden	3–1	Montenegro	Solna, Sweden
20:45 (UTC+2)	Berg 38'; Ibrahimović 40', 44'	Report	Damjanović 64'	Stadium: Friends Arena; Attendance: 32,224; Referee: Hüseyin Göçek (Turkey)

5 September UEFA Euro 2016 qualifying	Russia	1–0	Sweden	Moscow, Russia
18:00 (UTC+3)	Dzyuba 38'	Report		Stadium: Otkritie Arena; Attendance: 43,768; Referee: Mark Clattenburg (England)

8 September UEFA Euro 2016 qualifying	Sweden	1–4	Austria	Solna, Sweden
20:45 (UTC+2)	Ibrahimović 90+1'	Report	Alaba 9' (pen.); Harnik 38', 88'; Janko 77'	Stadium: Friends Arena; Attendance: 48,355; Referee: Carlos Velasco Carballo (Spain)

9 October UEFA Euro 2016 qualifying	Liechtenstein	0–2	Sweden	Vaduz, Liechtenstein
20:45 (UTC+2)		Report	Berg 18'; Ibrahimović 55'	Stadium: Rheinpark Stadion; Attendance: 4,740; Referee: Liran Liany (Israel)

12 October UEFA Euro 2016 qualifying	Sweden	2–0	Moldova	Solna, Sweden
18:00 (UTC+2)	Ibrahimović 24'; Zengin 48'	Report		Stadium: Friends Arena; Attendance: 25,351; Referee: Luca Banti (Italy)

14 November UEFA Euro 2016 qualifying	Sweden	2–1	Denmark	Solna, Sweden
20:45 (UTC+1)	Forsberg 45'; Ibrahimović 50' (pen.)	Report	Jørgensen 80'	Stadium: Friends Arena; Attendance: 49,053; Referee: Nicola Rizzoli (Italy)

17 November UEFA Euro 2016 qualifying	Denmark	2–2	Sweden	Copenhagen, Denmark
20:45 (UTC+1)	Y. Poulsen 82'; Vestergaard 90+1'	Report	Ibrahimović 19', 76'	Stadium: Parken Stadium; Attendance: 36,051; Referee: Martin Atkinson (England)

=== 2016 ===
6 January Friendly	Sweden	1–1	Estonia	Abu Dhabi, United Arab Emirates
19:45 UTC+4	Ishak 70'	Report	Prosa 56'	Stadium: Armed Forces Stadium; Attendance: 100; Referee: Ahmad Salem Khalfan (United Arab Emirates)

10 January Friendly	Finland	0–3	Sweden	Abu Dhabi, United Arab Emirates
18:45 UTC+4		Report	Salomonsson 45+1' (pen.); Hallberg 46'; Kujović 59'	Stadium: Armed Forces Stadium; Attendance: 50; Referee: Abdullah Al Ajel (United Arab Emirates)

24 March Friendly	Turkey	2–1	Sweden	Antalya, Turkey
20:45 UTC+2	Tosun 32', 81'	Report	Granqvist 74'	Stadium: New Antalya Stadium; Attendance: 33,000; Referee: Danny Makkelie (Netherlands)

29 March Friendly	Sweden	1–1	Czech Republic	Solna, Sweden
20:30 UTC+2	Berg 14'	Report	Vydra 26'	Stadium: Friends Arena; Attendance: 18,475; Referee: Bas Nijhuis (Netherlands)

30 May Friendly	Sweden	0–0	Slovenia	Malmö, Sweden
19:30 UTC+2		Report		Stadium: Swedbank Stadion; Attendance: 16,925; Referee: Jakob Kehlet (Denmark)

5 June Friendly	Sweden	3–0	Wales	Solna, Sweden
16:00 UTC+2	Forsberg 40'; Lustig 57'; Guidetti 87'	Report		Stadium: Friends Arena; Attendance: 37,942; Referee: Tobias Welz (Germany)

13 June UEFA Euro 2016 Group E	Republic of Ireland	1–1	Sweden	Saint-Denis, France
18:00 UTC+2	Hoolahan 48'	Report	Clark 71' (o.g.)	Stadium: Stade de France; Attendance: 73,419; Referee: Milorad Mažić (Serbia)

17 June UEFA Euro 2016 Group E	Italy	1–0	Sweden	Toulouse, France
15:00 UTC+2	Éder 88'	Report		Stadium: Stadium Municipal; Attendance: 29,600; Referee: Viktor Kassai (Hungary)

22 June UEFA Euro 2016 Group E	Sweden	0–1	Belgium	Nice, France
21:00 UTC+2		Report	Nainggolan 84'	Stadium: Allianz Riviera; Attendance: 34,011; Referee: Felix Brych (Germany)

6 September 2018 FIFA World Cup qualification	Sweden	1–1	Netherlands	Solna, Sweden
20:45 UTC+2	Berg 43'	Report	Sneijder 67'	Stadium: Friends Arena; Attendance: 36,128; Referee: Daniele Orsato (Italy)

7 October 2018 FIFA World Cup qualification	Luxembourg	0–1	Sweden	Luxembourg City, Luxembourg
20:45 UTC+2		Report	Lustig 58'	Stadium: Stade Josy Barthel; Referee: Ivan Bebek (Croatia)

10 October 2018 FIFA World Cup qualification	Sweden	3–0	Bulgaria	Solna, Sweden
20:45 UTC+2	Toivonen 39'; Hiljemark 45'; Lindelöf 58'	Report		Stadium: Friends Arena; Attendance: 21,777; Referee: Michael Oliver (England)

11 November 2018 FIFA World Cup qualification	France	2–1	Sweden	Saint-Denis, France
20:45 UTC+1	Pogba 58'; Payet 65'	Report	Forsberg 55'	Stadium: Stade de France; Attendance: 80,000; Referee: Milorad Mažić (Serbia)

15 November Friendly	Hungary	0–2	Sweden	Budapest, Hungary
19:45 UTC+1		Report	Larsson 30'; Kiese Thelin 67'	Stadium: Groupama Arena; Attendance: 16,842; Referee: Paolo Valeri (Italy)

=== 2017 ===
8 January Friendly	Sweden	1–2	Ivory Coast	Abu Dhabi, United Arab Emirates
16:45 UTC+4	Kanon 39' (o.g.)	Report	N'Guessan 45+1'; Sio 50'	Stadium: Zayed Sports City Stadium; Attendance: 300; Referee: Amaar Aljenabi (United Arab Emirates)

12 January Friendly	Sweden	6–0	Slovakia	Abu Dhabi, United Arab Emirates
16:45 UTC+4	Isak 19'; Moberg Karlsson 51'; Andersson 59', 79'; Frick 89'; Ghoddos 90+2'	Report		Stadium: Zayed Sports City Stadium; Attendance: 100; Referee: Eaasa Abdulaah Hasan (Bahrain)

25 March 2018 FIFA World Cup qualification	Sweden	4–0	Belarus	Solna, Sweden
18:00 UTC+1	Forsberg 19' (pen.), 49'; Berg 57'; Kiese Thelin 78'	Report		Stadium: Friends Arena; Attendance: 31,243; Referee: Harald Lechner (Austria)

28 March Friendly	Portugal	2–3	Sweden	Funchal, Portugal
19:45 UTC+1	Ronaldo 18'; Granqvist 34' (o.g.)	Report	Claesson 57', 76'; Cancelo 90+2' (o.g.)	Stadium: Estádio do Marítimo; Attendance: 10,415; Referee: Clément Turpin (France)

9 June 2018 FIFA World Cup qualification	Sweden	2–1	France	Solna, Sweden
20:45 UTC+2	Durmaz 43'; Toivonen 90+3'	Report	Giroud 37'	Stadium: Friends Arena; Attendance: 48,783; Referee: Martin Atkinson (England)

13 June Friendly	Norway	1–1	Sweden	Oslo, Norway
19:45 (UTC+1)	Elyounoussi 45'	Report	Armenteros 82'	Stadium: Ullevaal Stadion; Attendance: 11,940; Referee: Daniel Stefański (Poland)

31 August 2018 FIFA World Cup qualification	Bulgaria	3–2	Sweden	Sofia, Bulgaria
21:45 UTC+3	Manolev 12'; Kostadinov 33'; Chochev 79'	Report	Lustig 29'; Berg 44'	Stadium: Vasil Levski National Stadium; Attendance: 12,121; Referee: Paolo Tagliavento (Italy)

3 September 2018 FIFA World Cup qualification	Belarus	0–4	Sweden	Barysaw, Belarus
19:00 UTC+3		Report	Forsberg 18'; Nyman 24'; Berg 37'; Granqvist 84' (pen.)	Stadium: Borisov Arena; Attendance: 6,431; Referee: Tobias Stieler (Germany)

7 October 2018 FIFA World Cup qualification	Sweden	8–0	Luxembourg	Solna, Sweden
18:00 UTC+2	Granqvist 10' (pen.), 67' (pen.); Berg 18', 37', 54', 71'; Lustig 60'; Toivonen 76'	Report		Stadium: Friends Arena; Attendance: 50,022; Referee: Hüseyin Göçek (Turkey)

10 October 2018 FIFA World Cup qualification	Netherlands	2–0	Sweden	Amsterdam, Netherlands
20:45 UTC+2	Robben 16' (pen.), 40'	Report		Stadium: Amsterdam Arena; Attendance: 41,244; Referee: Sergei Karasev (Russia)

10 November 2018 FIFA World Cup qualification play-offs	Sweden	1–0	Italy	Solna, Sweden
20:45 UTC+1	Johansson 61'	Report		Stadium: Friends Arena; Attendance: 49,193; Referee: Cüneyt Çakır (Turkey)

13 November 2018 FIFA World Cup qualification play-offs	Italy	0–0 (0–1 agg.)	Sweden	Milan, Italy
20:45 UTC+1		Report		Stadium: San Siro; Attendance: 72,696; Referee: Antonio Mateu Lahoz (Spain)

=== 2018 ===
7 January Friendly	Sweden	1–1	Estonia	Abu Dhabi, United Arab Emirates
21:15 UTC+4	Holmberg 79'	Report	Anier 58'	Stadium: Zayed Sports City Stadium; Attendance: 200; Referee: Antti Munukka (Finland)

11 January Friendly	Sweden	1–0	Denmark League XI	Abu Dhabi, United Arab Emirates
20:45 UTC+4	G. Nilsson 90+3'	Report		Stadium: Zayed Sports City Stadium; Attendance: 175; Referee: Antti Munukka (Finland)

24 March Friendly	Sweden	1–2	Chile	Solna, Sweden
18:00 UTC+1	Toivonen 23'	Report	Vidal 22'; Bolados 90'	Stadium: Friends Arena; Attendance: 48,134; Referee: Anthony Taylor (England)

27 March Friendly	Romania	1–0	Sweden	Craiova, Romania
21:30 UTC+3	Rotariu 57'	Report		Stadium: Stadionul Ion Oblemenco; Attendance: 20,000; Referee: Roi Reinshreiber (Israel)

2 June Friendly	Sweden	0–0	Denmark	Solna, Sweden
19:45 UTC+2		Report		Stadium: Friends Arena; Attendance: 41,558; Referee: Tobias Stieler (Germany)

9 June Friendly	Sweden	0–0	Peru	Gothenburg, Sweden
19:15 UTC+2		Report		Stadium: Ullevi; Attendance: 32,163; Referee: Svein Oddvar Moen (Norway)

18 June 2018 FIFA World Cup Group F	Sweden	1–0	South Korea	Nizhny Novgorod, Russia
15:00 UTC+3	Granqvist 65' (pen.)	Report		Stadium: Nizhny Novgorod Stadium; Attendance: 42,300; Referee: Joel Aguilar (El Salvador)

23 June 2018 FIFA World Cup Group F	Germany	2–1	Sweden	Sochi, Russia
21:00 UTC+3	Reus 48'; Kroos 90+5'	Report	Toivonen 32'	Stadium: Fisht Olympic Stadium; Attendance: 44,287; Referee: Szymon Marciniak (Poland)

27 June 2018 FIFA World Cup Group F	Mexico	0–3	Sweden	Yekaterinburg, Russia
19:00 UTC+5		Report	Augustinsson 50'; Granqvist 62' (pen.); Álvarez 74' (o.g.)	Stadium: Central Stadium; Attendance: 33,061; Referee: Néstor Pitana (Argentina)

3 July 2018 FIFA World Cup Round of 16	Sweden	1–0	Switzerland	Saint Petersburg, Russia
17:00 UTC+3	Forsberg 66'	Report		Stadium: Krestovsky Stadium; Attendance: 64,042; Referee: Damir Skomina (Slovenia)

7 July 2018 FIFA World Cup Quarter-final	Sweden	0–2	England	Samara, Russia
18:00 UTC+4		Report	Maguire 30'; Alli 59'	Stadium: Cosmos Arena; Attendance: 39,991; Referee: Björn Kuipers (Netherlands)

6 September Friendly	Austria	2–0	Sweden	Vienna, Austria
20:45 UTC+2	Helander 11' (o.g.); Alaba 64'	Report		Stadium: Generali Arena; Attendance: 11,100; Referee: Paweł Gil (Poland)

10 September 2018–19 UEFA Nations League	Sweden	2–3	Turkey	Solna, Sweden
20:45 UTC+2	Kiese Thelin 35'; Claesson 49'	Report	Çalhanoğlu 51'; Akbaba 88', 90+2'	Stadium: Friends Arena; Attendance: 21,832; Referee: Jesús Gil Manzano (Spain)

11 October 2018–19 UEFA Nations League	Russia	0–0	Sweden	Kaliningrad, Russia
21:45 UTC+2		Report		Stadium: Kaliningrad Stadium; Attendance: 31,698; Referee: Luca Banti (Italy)

16 October Friendly	Sweden	1–1	Slovakia	Solna, Sweden
20:45 UTC+2	Guidetti 52'	Report	Rusnák 84'	Stadium: Friends Arena; Attendance: 9,876; Referee: Jakob Kehlet (Denmark)

17 November 2018–19 UEFA Nations League	Turkey	0–1	Sweden	Konya, Turkey
20:00 UTC+3		Report	Granqvist 71' (pen.)	Stadium: Konya Büyükşehir Stadium; Attendance: 42,000; Referee: István Kovács (Romania)

20 November 2018–19 UEFA Nations League	Sweden	2–0	Russia	Solna, Sweden
20:45 UTC+1	Lindelöf 41'; Berg 72'	Report		Stadium: Friends Arena; Attendance: 20,223; Referee: Benoît Bastien (France)

=== 2019 ===
8 January Friendly	Sweden	0–1	Finland	Doha, Qatar
19:45 UTC+3		Report	Markkanen 22'	Stadium: Al Sadd Sports Club; Attendance: 326; Referee: Abdulla Al-Marri (Qatar)

11 January Friendly	Sweden	2–2	Iceland	Doha, Qatar
19:45 UTC+3	Gyökeres 47'; Thern 66'	Report	Karlsson 6'; Þorsteinsson 90+3'	Stadium: Khalifa International Stadium; Attendance: 187; Referee: Mohammed Al-Shammari (Qatar)

23 March UEFA Euro 2020 qualifying	Sweden	2–1	Romania	Solna, Sweden
18:00 UTC+1	Quaison 33'; Claesson 40'	Report	Keșerü 58'	Stadium: Friends Arena; Attendance: 30,115; Referee: Michael Oliver (England)

26 March UEFA Euro 2020 qualifying	Norway	3–3	Sweden	Oslo, Norway
20:45 UTC+1	Johnsen 41'; King 59'; Kamara 90+7'	Report	Claesson 70'; Quaison 86', 90+1'	Stadium: Ullevaal Stadium; Attendance: 23,459; Referee: Gianluca Rocchi (Italy)

7 June UEFA Euro 2020 qualifying	Sweden	3–0	Malta	Solna, Sweden
20:45 UTC+2	Quaison 2'; Claesson 50'; Isak 81'	Report		Stadium: Friends Arena; Attendance: 26,421; Referee: Rob Harvey (Republic of Ireland)

10 June UEFA Euro 2020 qualifying	Spain	3–0	Sweden	Madrid, Spain
20:45 UTC+2	Ramos 64' (pen.); Morata 85' (pen.); Oyarzabal 87'	Report		Stadium: Santiago Bernabéu; Attendance: 72,205; Referee: William Collum (Scotland)

5 September UEFA Euro 2020 qualifying	Faroe Islands	0–4	Sweden	Tórshavn, Faroe Islands
19:45 UTC+1		Report	Isak 12', 15'; Lindelöf 23'; Quaison 41'	Stadium: Tórsvøllur; Attendance: 3,108; Referee: Tiago Martins (Portugal)

8 September UEFA Euro 2020 qualifying	Sweden	1–1	Norway	Solna, Sweden
20:45 UTC+2	Forsberg 60'	Report	Johansen 45'	Stadium: Friends Arena; Attendance: 38,372; Referee: Slavko Vinčić (Slovenia)

12 October UEFA Euro 2020 qualifying	Malta	0–4	Sweden	Ta' Qali, Malta
20:45 UTC+2		Report	Danielson 11'; Larsson 58' (pen.), 71' (pen.); Agius 66' (o.g.)	Stadium: National Stadium; Attendance: 10,702; Referee: Sergey Ivanov (Russia)

15 October UEFA Euro 2020 qualifying	Sweden	1–1	Spain	Solna, Sweden
20:45 UTC+2	Berg 50'	Report	Rodrigo 90+2'	Stadium: Friends Arena; Attendance: 49,712; Referee: Clément Turpin (France)

15 November UEFA Euro 2020 qualifying	Romania	0–2	Sweden	Bucharest, Romania
20:45 UTC+1		Report	Berg 18'; Quaison 34'	Stadium: Arena Națională; Attendance: 49,678; Referee: Daniele Orsato (Italy)

18 November UEFA Euro 2020 qualifying	Sweden	3–0	Faroe Islands	Solna, Sweden
20:45 UTC+1	Andersson 29'; Svanberg 72'; Guidetti 80'	Report		Stadium: Friends Arena; Referee: Matej Jug (Slovenia)
