= Gollini =

Gollini is an Italian surname. Notable people with the surname include:

- Alfredo Gollini (1881–1957), Italian gymnast
- Pierluigi Gollini (born 1995), Italian footballer

== See also ==
- Bollini
- Golling (disambiguation)
