= UEFA Euro 2012 qualifying Group E =

Football competition grouping

This page shows the standings and results for Group E of the UEFA Euro 2012 qualifying tournament.

The Netherlands won the group, with Sweden finishing second and qualifying directly for the finals as the best runner-up.

== Standings ==
Pos	Team	Pld	W	D	L	GF	GA	GD	Pts	Qualification	(Netherlands)	(Sweden)	(Hungary)	(Finland)	(Moldova)	(San Marino)
1	Netherlands	10	9	0	1	37	8	+29	27	Qualify for final tournament	—	4–1	5–3	2–1	1–0	11–0
2	Sweden	10	8	0	2	31	11	+20	24	Qualify for final tournament	3–2	—	2–0	5–0	2–1	6–0
3	Hungary	10	6	1	3	22	14	+8	19		0–4	2–1	—	0–0	2–1	8–0
4	Finland	10	3	1	6	16	16	0	10		0–2	1–2	1–2	—	4–1	8–0
5	Moldova	10	3	0	7	12	16	−4	9		0–1	1–4	0–2	2–0	—	4–0
6	San Marino	10	0	0	10	0	53	−53	0		0–5	0–5	0–3	0–1	0–2	—

Source: UEFA
Rules for classification: Qualification tiebreakers

== Matches ==
Group E fixtures were negotiated between the participants at a meeting in Amsterdam, Netherlands on 17 February 2010.

3 September 2010
19:30 UTC+03:00

Moldova	2–0	Finland
Suvorov 69'; Doroș 74'	Report

Zimbru Stadium, Chișinău
Attendance: 10,300
Referee: Robert Małek (Poland)
3 September 2010
20:00 UTC+02:00

Sweden	2–0	Hungary
Wernbloom 51', 73'	Report

Råsunda Stadium, Solna
Attendance: 32,304
Referee: Martin Atkinson (England)
3 September 2010
20:45 UTC+02:00

San Marino	0–5	Netherlands
	Report	Kuyt 16' (pen.); Huntelaar 38', 48', 66'; Van Nistelrooy 89'

Stadio Olimpico, Serravalle
Attendance: 4,127
Referee: Simon Lee Evans (Wales)

7 September 2010
20:00 UTC+02:00

Sweden	6–0	San Marino
Ibrahimović 7', 77'; D. Simoncini 12' (o.g.); A. Simoncini 26' (o.g.); Granqvist 51'; Berg 90+3'	Report

Swedbank Stadion, Malmö
Attendance: 21,083
Referee: David McKeon (Republic of Ireland)
7 September 2010
20:30 UTC+02:00

Hungary	2–1	Moldova
Rudolf 50'; Koman 66'	Report	Suvorov 79'

Szusza Ferenc Stadion, Budapest
Attendance: 9,209
Referee: Libor Kovařík (Czech Republic)
7 September 2010
20:30 UTC+02:00

Netherlands	2–1	Finland
Huntelaar 7', 16' (pen.)	Report	Forssell 18'

De Kuip, Rotterdam
Attendance: 25,000
Referee: Alexey Nikolaev (Russia)

8 October 2010
19:00 UTC+02:00

Hungary	8–0	San Marino
Rudolf 11', 25'; Szalai 18', 27', 48'; Koman 60'; Dzsudzsák 89'; Gera 90+4' (pen.)	Report

Stadium Puskás Ferenc, Budapest
Attendance: 10,596
Referee: Hannes Kaasik (Estonia)
8 October 2010
21:30 UTC+03:00

Moldova	0–1	Netherlands
	Report	Huntelaar 37'

Zimbru Stadium, Chișinău
Attendance: 10,500
Referee: Florian Meyer (Germany)

12 October 2010
18:30 UTC+03:00

Finland	1–2	Hungary
Forssell 86'	Report	Szalai 50'; Dzsudzsák 90+4'

Olympic Stadium, Helsinki
Attendance: 18,532
Referee: Alan Kelly (Republic of Ireland)
12 October 2010
20:30 UTC+02:00

Netherlands	4–1	Sweden
Huntelaar 4', 55'; Afellay 37', 59'	Report	Granqvist 69'

Amsterdam Arena, Amsterdam
Attendance: 46,000
Referee: Stéphane Lannoy (France)
12 October 2010
20:30 UTC+02:00

San Marino	0–2	Moldova
	Report	Josan 20'; Doroș 86' (pen.)

Stadio Olimpico, Serravalle
Attendance: 714
Referee: Mark Courtney (Northern Ireland)

17 November 2010
18:30 UTC+02:00

Finland	8–0	San Marino
Väyrynen 39'; Hämäläinen 49', 67'; Forssell 51', 59', 78'; Litmanen 71' (pen.); Porokara 73'	Report

Olympic Stadium, Helsinki
Attendance: 8,192
Referee: Radek Matějek (Czech Republic)

25 March 2011
20:30 UTC+01:00

Hungary	0–4	Netherlands
	Report	Van der Vaart 8'; Afellay 45'; Kuyt 54'; Van Persie 62'

Stadium Puskás Ferenc, Budapest
Attendance: 23,817
Referee: Carlos Velasco Carballo (Spain)

29 March 2011
19:00 UTC+02:00

Sweden	2–1	Moldova
Lustig 30'; Larsson 82'	Report	Suvorov 90+2'

Råsunda Stadium, Solna
Attendance: 25,544
Referee: Knut Kircher (Germany)
29 March 2011
20:30 UTC+02:00

Netherlands	5–3	Hungary
Van Persie 13'; Sneijder 61'; Van Nistelrooy 73'; Kuyt 78', 81'	Report	Rudolf 46'; Gera 50', 75'

Amsterdam Arena, Amsterdam
Attendance: 51,774
Referee: Svein Oddvar Moen (Norway)

3 June 2011
20:30 UTC+02:00

San Marino	0–1	Finland
	Report	Forssell 41'

Stadio Olimpico, Serravalle
Attendance: 1,218
Referee: Andrejs Sipailo (Latvia)
3 June 2011
21:30 UTC+03:00

Moldova	1–4	Sweden
Bugaiov 61'	Report	Toivonen 11'; Elmander 30', 58'; Gerndt 88'

Zimbru Stadium, Chișinău
Attendance: 10,500
Referee: Andre Marriner (England)

7 June 2011
20:00 UTC+02:00

Sweden	5–0	Finland
Källström 12'; Ibrahimović 31', 35', 53'; Bajrami 84'	Report

Råsunda Stadium, Solna
Attendance: 32,128
Referee: Antony Gautier (France)
7 June 2011
20:30 UTC+02:00

San Marino	0–3	Hungary
	Report	Lipták 40'; Szabics 49'; Koman 83'

Stadio Olimpico, Serravalle
Attendance: 1,915
Referee: Pavle Radovanović (Montenegro)

2 September 2011
18:30 UTC+03:00

Finland	4–1	Moldova
Hämäläinen 11', 43'; Forssell 52' (pen.); Armaș 71' (o.g.)	Report	Alexeev 85'

Olympic Stadium, Helsinki
Attendance: 9,056
Referee: Anastassios Kakos (Greece)
2 September 2011
19:45 UTC+02:00

Hungary	2–1	Sweden
Szabics 44'; Rudolf 90'	Report	Wilhelmsson 60'

Stadium Puskás Ferenc, Budapest
Attendance: 23,500
Referee: Damir Skomina (Slovenia)
2 September 2011
20:30 UTC+02:00

Netherlands	11–0	San Marino
Van Persie 7', 65', 67', 79'; Sneijder 12', 87'; Heitinga 17'; Kuyt 49'; Huntelaar 56', 77'; Wijnaldum 89'	Report

Philips Stadion, Eindhoven
Attendance: 35,000
Referee: Liran Liany (Israel)

6 September 2011
20:00 UTC+03:00

Finland	0–2	Netherlands
	Report	Strootman 29'; L. de Jong 90+3'

Olympic Stadium, Helsinki
Attendance: 21,580
Referee: Manuel Gräfe (Germany)
6 September 2011
20:45 UTC+03:00

Moldova	0–2	Hungary
	Report	Vanczák 7'; Rudolf 83'

Zimbru Stadium, Chișinău
Attendance: 10,500
Referee: Ivan Bebek (Croatia)
6 September 2011
20:30 UTC+02:00

San Marino	0–5	Sweden
	Report	Källström 64'; Wilhelmsson 70', 90+3'; M. Olsson 81'; Hysén 89'

Stadio Olimpico, Serravalle
Attendance: 2,946
Referee: Steven McLean (Scotland)

7 October 2011
19:15 UTC+03:00

Finland	1–2	Sweden
Toivio 73'	Report	Larsson 8'; M. Olsson 52'

Olympic Stadium, Helsinki
Attendance: 23,257
Referee: Mark Clattenburg (England)
7 October 2011
20:30 UTC+02:00

Netherlands	1–0	Moldova
Huntelaar 40'	Report

De Kuip, Rotterdam
Attendance: 47,226
Referee: Matej Jug (Slovenia)

11 October 2011
20:00 UTC+02:00

Hungary	0–0	Finland
	Report

Stadium Puskás Ferenc, Budapest
Attendance: 25,169
Referee: Alberto Undiano Mallenco (Spain)
11 October 2011
21:00 UTC+03:00

Moldova	4–0	San Marino
Zmeu 30'; Bacciocchi 61' (o.g.); Suvorov 66'; Andronic 87'	Report

Zimbru Stadium, Chișinău
Attendance: 6,534
Referee: Petur Reinert (Faroe Islands)
11 October 2011
20:15 UTC+02:00

Sweden	3–2	Netherlands
Källström 14'; Larsson 52' (pen.); Toivonen 53'	Report	Huntelaar 23'; Kuyt 50'

Råsunda Stadium, Solna
Attendance: 33,066
Referee: Cüneyt Çakır (Turkey)

== Goalscorers ==
There were 118 goals scored in 30 matches, for an average of 3.93 goals per match.

12 goals

- (Netherlands national football team) Klaas-Jan Huntelaar

7 goals

- (Finland national football team) Mikael Forssell

6 goals

- (Hungary national football team) Gergely Rudolf
- (Netherlands national football team) Dirk Kuyt
- (Netherlands national football team) Robin van Persie

5 goals

- (Sweden men's national football team) Zlatan Ibrahimović

4 goals

- (Finland national football team) Kasper Hämäläinen
- (Hungary national football team) Ádám Szalai
- (Moldova national football team) Alexandru Suvorov

3 goals

- (Hungary national football team) Zoltán Gera
- (Hungary national football team) Vladimir Koman
- (Netherlands national football team) Ibrahim Afellay
- (Netherlands national football team) Wesley Sneijder
- (Sweden men's national football team) Kim Källström
- (Sweden men's national football team) Sebastian Larsson
- (Sweden men's national football team) Christian Wilhelmsson

2 goals

- (Hungary national football team) Balázs Dzsudzsák
- (Hungary national football team) Imre Szabics
- (Moldova national football team) Anatolie Doroș
- (Netherlands national football team) Ruud van Nistelrooy
- (Sweden men's national football team) Johan Elmander
- (Sweden men's national football team) Andreas Granqvist
- (Sweden men's national football team) Martin Olsson
- (Sweden men's national football team) Ola Toivonen
- (Sweden men's national football team) Pontus Wernbloom

1 goal

- (Finland national football team) Jari Litmanen
- (Finland national football team) Roni Porokara
- (Finland national football team) Joona Toivio
- (Finland national football team) Mika Väyrynen
- (Hungary national football team) Zoltán Lipták
- (Hungary national football team) Vilmos Vanczák
- (Moldova national football team) Serghei Alexeev
- (Moldova national football team) Gheorghe Andronic
- (Moldova national football team) Igor Bugaiov
- (Moldova national football team) Nicolae Josan
- (Moldova national football team) Denis Zmeu
- (Netherlands national football team) Luuk de Jong
- (Netherlands national football team) John Heitinga
- (Netherlands national football team) Kevin Strootman
- (Netherlands national football team) Rafael van der Vaart
- (Netherlands national football team) Georginio Wijnaldum
- (Sweden men's national football team) Emir Bajrami
- (Sweden men's national football team) Marcus Berg
- (Sweden men's national football team) Alexander Gerndt
- (Sweden men's national football team) Tobias Hysén
- (Sweden men's national football team) Mikael Lustig

1 own goal

- (Moldova national football team) Igor Armaș (against Finland)
- (San Marino national football team) Simone Bacciocchi (against Moldova)
- (San Marino national football team) Aldo Junior Simoncini (against Sweden)
- (San Marino national football team) Davide Simoncini (against Sweden)

== Discipline ==
Pos	Player	Country	Yellow card	Red card	Suspended for match(es)	Reason
DF	Davide Simoncini	San Marino	4	1	vs Sweden (6 September 2011) vs Moldova (11 October 2011)	Booked in 2 UEFA Euro 2012 qualifying matches Sent off in a UEFA Euro 2012 qualifying match
FW	Përparim Hetemaj	Finland	3	1	vs Sweden (7 October 2011)	Sent off in a UEFA Euro 2012 qualifying match
FW	Carlo Valentini	San Marino	2	1	vs Moldova (12 October 2010)	Sent off in a UEFA Euro 2012 qualifying match
MF	Igor Tîgîrlaș	Moldova	1	1	TBD	Sent off in UEFA Euro 2012 qualifying match
DF	Sami Hyypiä	Finland	0	1	vs Netherlands (7 September 2010)	Sent off in a UEFA Euro 2012 qualifying match
DF	Olof Mellberg	Sweden	0	1	vs Netherlands (12 October 2010) vs Moldova (29 March 2011)	Sent off in a UEFA Euro 2012 qualifying match
DF	Zoltán Lipták	Hungary	5	0	vs San Marino (8 October 2010) vs Netherlands (29 March 2011)	Booked in 2 UEFA Euro 2012 qualifying matches
DF	Roland Juhász	Hungary	4	0	vs Sweden (2 September 2011) vs Finland (11 October 2011)	Booked in 2 UEFA Euro 2012 qualifying matches
DF	Alessandro Della Valle	San Marino	4	0	vs Moldova (12 October 2010) vs Netherlands (2 September 2011)	Booked in 2 UEFA Euro 2012 qualifying matches
DF	Pál Lázár	Hungary	3	0	vs San Marino (8 October 2010)	Booked in 2 UEFA Euro 2012 qualifying matches
FW	Simone Bacciocchi	San Marino	3	0	vs Finland (17 November 2010)	Booked in 2 UEFA Euro 2012 qualifying matches
DF	Maicol Berretti	San Marino	3	0	vs Netherlands (2 September 2011)	Booked in 2 UEFA Euro 2012 qualifying matches
DF	Fabio Vitaioli	San Marino	3	0	vs Finland (17 November 2010)	Booked in 2 UEFA Euro 2012 qualifying matches
DF	Ákos Elek	Hungary	2	0	vs Netherlands (29 March 2011)	Booked in 2 UEFA Euro 2012 qualifying matches
DF	Zsolt Laczkó	Hungary	2	0	vs Finland (11 October 2011)	Booked in 2 UEFA Euro 2012 qualifying matches
DF	Vilmos Vanczák	Hungary	2	0	vs Sweden (2 September 2011)	Booked in 2 UEFA Euro 2012 qualifying matches
DF	Davide Simoncini	San Marino	2	0	vs Hungary (7 June 2011)	Booked in 2 UEFA Euro 2012 qualifying matches
FW	Matteo Vitaioli	San Marino	2	0	TBD	Booked in 2 UEFA Euro 2012 qualifying matches
FW	Zlatan Ibrahimović	Sweden	2	0	vs Netherlands (11 October 2011)	Booked in 2 UEFA Euro 2012 qualifying matches
FW	Ola Toivonen	Sweden	2	0	vs Moldova (29 March 2011)	Booked in 2 UEFA Euro 2012 qualifying matches
