= Bugli =

Bugli is a surname. Notable people with the surname include:

- Lorenzo Bugli (born 1995), Sammarinese politician
- Matteo Bugli (born 1983), Sammarinese footballer
