= Gollings =

Gollings is a surname. Notable people with the surname include:

- Ben Gollings (born 1980), British former rugby union player
- John Gollings (born 1944), Australian architectural photographer
- Platt Gollings (1878–1935), British footballer
- Steve Gollings, British racehorse trainer
- E. William Gollings (1878–1932), American painter

== See also ==
- Golling (disambiguation), which includes people with the surname
