= Ceccoli =

Ceccoli is an Italian surname popular in San Marino.

== Notable people ==
- Alvin Ceccoli (born 1974) is an Australian-Sammarinese footballer
- Edda Ceccoli (born 1947), captain regent of San Marino
- Michele Ceccoli (born 1973), Sammarinese footballer
- Nicoletta Ceccoli (born 1973), Italian artist

== TV character ==
- Anthony Ceccoli, a character in Dollhouse, also known as Victor
