= Philippe Gladines =

French footballer (born 1960)

Personal information
- Full name: Philippe Gladines
- Date of birth: August 19, 1960 (age 66)
- Place of birth: Aurillac, France
- Height: 1.80 m (5 ft 11 in)
- Position: Striker

Senior career*
Years	Team	Apps	(Gls)
1981–1982	Metz	20	(3)
1982–1983	Fontainebleau	?	(?)
1983–1985	Louhans-Cuiseaux	70	(13)
1985–1987	Chamois Niortais	61	(12)
1987–1988	Valenciennes	27	(3)
1988–1991	La Roche-sur-Yon	27	(1)
- * Club domestic league appearances and goals

Philippe Gladines (born August 19, 1960 in Aurillac, France) is a former professional footballer who played as a striker. He was a member of the French squad that won a silver medal at the 1987 Mediterranean Games.
