= Giovanni Bonini (footballer) =

Sammarinese footballer

Personal information
- Date of birth: September 5, 1986 (age 40)
- Place of birth: San Marino, San Marino
- Height: 1.76 m (5 ft 9 in)
- Position: Midfielder

Youth career
- San Marino Calcio

Senior career*
Years	Team	Apps	(Gls)
2005–2006	San Marino Calcio	1	(0)
2006–2007	AC Dozzese		
2007–2008	AS Real Misano		
2009–2010	S.P. Cailungo		
2010–2017	S.P. Tre Penne	70	(1)
2017–2018	A.C. Libertas	20	(0)
2019–2021	Tre Fiori	12	(0)
2021	F.C. Domagnano	9	(1)
2021–2022	Folgore	11	(0)
2022–2023	FC Domagnano	23	(0)

International career^{‡}
2006–2020	San Marino	29	(0)
- * Club domestic league appearances and goals as of 1 June 2024 ‡ National team caps and goals as of 7 October 2020

Giovanni Bonini (born 5 September 1986) is a former midfielder from San Marino. He last played for FC Domagnano and was capped by San Marino.
