= Golling =

Golling may refer to:

== People ==
- Alexander Golling (1905–1989), German actor
- Friedrich Golling (1883–1974), Austrian fencer

== Places ==
- Golling an der Erlauf, Lower Austria, Austria, a town
- Golling an der Salzach, Salzburg, Austria, a town
  - Golling, a cadastral community
  - Burg Golling, a castle
  - Golling station, a Salzburg-Tyrol Railway station
  - Golling Waterfall

== See also ==
- Gollings, a list of people with the surname
