= Pierangelo Manzaroli =

Sammarinese footballer

Personal information
- Full name: Pierangelo Manzaroli
- Date of birth: 25 March 1969 (age 57)
- Place of birth: Rimini, Italy
- Height: 1.77 m (5 ft 10 in)
- Position: Midfielder

Senior career*
| Years | Team | Apps | (Gls) |
| 1999–2001 | Cosmos | 45 | (10) |
| 2001–2002 | Cailungo | 29 | (9) |
| 2002–2004 | San Marino | 63 | (17) |
| 2004–2005 | Pennarossa | 12 | (8) |
| Total | | 149 | (44) |

International career
| 1991–2001 | San Marino | 38 | (0) |

Managerial career
- 2006–2007: Pennarossa
- 2007–2008: Libertas
- 2007–2009: San Marino B
- 2009–2010: San Marino U15
- 2010–2014: San Marino U21
- 2014–2017: San Marino
- * Club domestic league appearances and goals

Pierangelo Manzaroli (born 25 March 1969) is a Sammarinese former football player and manager who is currently the head of football of the Sammarinese Football Federation.

== Career ==
Manzaroli was a midfielder and played for the San Marino national team.

Having managed the San Marino U21s team to a competitive win on home soil over Wales, he moved to take the job of the senior team. He took the place of record-making manager Giampaolo Mazza. Manzaroli's first match as manager was a home friendly against Albania. San Marino lost 0–3.

On 15 November 2014 he led his team to their first non-negative result in 10 years, when San Marino drew 0–0 at home against Estonia.

== Managerial statistics ==
| Team | Nat | From | To | Record | | | | |
| Team | Nat | From | To | G | W | D | L | Win % |
|---|---|---|---|---|---|---|---|---|
| San Marino | (San Marino) | 8 June 2014 | 8 October 2017 | 25 | 0 | 1 | 24 | 0.00 |
