= Mattia Masi =

Sammarinese footballer

Personal information
- Full name: Mattia Masi
- Date of birth: 4 December 1984 (age 41)
- Place of birth: City of San Marino, San Marino
- Height: 1.67 m (5 ft 6 in)
- Position: Midfielder

Senior career*
Years	Team	Apps	(Gls)
2001–2002	VF Colligiana	2	(0)
2004–2005	San Marino		
2005–2006	VF Colligiana		
2006–2008	Virtus Poggibonsi		
2009–2013	GS Staggia		

International career
2005–2006	San Marino	4	(0)
- * Club domestic league appearances and goals

Mattia Masi (born 4 December 1984) is a Sammarinese former footballer who played as a midfielder. He was capped four times by the San Marino national team.
