= Noël Vidot =

French footballer and manager (born 1962)

Personal information
- Date of birth: 15 December 1962 (age 63)
- Place of birth: Saint-Denis, Réunion
- Height: 1.75 m (5 ft 9 in)
- Position: Midfielder

Youth career
- INF Vichy

Senior career*
Years	Team	Apps	(Gls)
- INF Vichy
	Le Havre AC	123	(7)
	Nîmes Olympique	58	(2)
	Stade Lavallois	99	(2)
	Le Mans FC	18	(1)

Managerial career
- 1994–1996: CS Saint-Denis
- 1997–1998: US Cambuston
- 2003: AS Chaudron
- 2003–2004: AS Chaudron
- 2007: Saint-Denis FC
- 2007: Réunion
- 2010: AS Marsouins
- * Club domestic league appearances and goals

Noël Vidot (born 15 December 1962) is a French professional football player and manager.

== Career ==
He played for the Le Havre AC, Nîmes Olympique, Stade Lavallois and Le Mans FC. He was a member of the French squad that won a silver medal at the 1987 Mediterranean Games.

In 1994, he began his coaching career. He coaches the CS Saint-Denis, US Cambuston and AS Chaudron. In 2007, he was a head coach of the Réunion national football team.
