= Elia Benedettini =

Sammarinese footballer (born 1995)

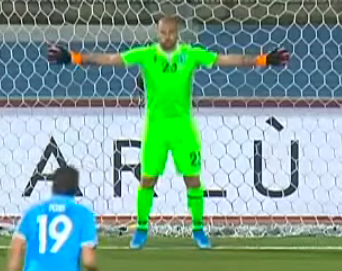
- Benedettini against Liechtenstein on 8 September 2020

Personal information
- Date of birth: 22 June 1995 (age 31)
- Place of birth: Borgo Maggiore, San Marino
- Height: 1.89 m (6 ft 2 in)
- Position: Goalkeeper

Senior career*
Years	Team	Apps	(Gls)
2012–2013	San Marino Calcio	1	(0)
2013–2014	Cesena	0	(0)
2014–2016	Pianese	46	(0)
2016–2020	Novara	16	(0)
2021–2022	Cesena	3	(0)
2022–2023	Cailungo	28	(0)
2023	Libertas	13	(0)
2024–2025	Murata	25	(0)

International career^{‡}
2010–2011	San Marino U17	2	(0)
2012	San Marino U19	3	(0)
2013–2016	San Marino U21	13	(0)
2015–2023	San Marino	48	(0)
- * Club domestic league appearances and goals as of 5 June 2026 ‡ National team caps and goals as of 17 November 2023

Elia Benedettini (born 22 June 1995) is a Sammarinese footballer who last played as a goalkeeper for Murata. He is the cousin of San Marino goalkeeper Simone.

== Club career ==
Benedettini began his career at San Marino Calcio in Lega Pro, the third tier of the Italian football system. He was first called up to a matchday squad on 24 September 2012, remaining an unused substitute in a 0–1 home loss against Pavia at the Stadio Olimpico in Serravalle. On 10 February 2013 he was called up again and remained unused in a 2–0 home win over PortoSummaga. His third call-up on 5 May resulted in his only appearance of the season, in a home match against Cremonese. Starting goalkeeper Mattia Migani was sent off in the second minute, so forward Francesco Cassola was substituted for Benedettini, who immediately conceded a penalty kick by Giuseppe Le Noci in an eventual 1–6 defeat.

On 21 July 2013, he joined Cesena for an undisclosed fee.

In July 2014, Benedettini moved to Serie D club Pianese.

In July 2016, he moved to Serie B club Novara on a free transfer. He made his competitive debut for the club on 24 December 2016 in a 4–1 away defeat to Virtus Entella. He was released by Novara by mutual consent on 9 October 2020.

On 14 January 2021, he returned to Cesena.

On 11 July 2022, Benedettini agreed to join Cailungo in Campionato Sammarinese di Calcio.

Benedettini agreed to terms with Libertas on 31 July 2023.

== International career ==
He made his senior international debut for San Marino on 27 June 2015, in a UEFA Euro 2016 qualifying match against Slovenia in Ljubljana, a 0–6 defeat. Prior to this, he had played for San Marino's youth teams.

== Personal life ==
Benedettini works for his parents' transport company while also playing football.

== Career statistics ==
=== International ===
As of match played 17 November 2023

Appearances and goals by national team and year
National team	Year	Apps	Goals
San Marino	2015	2	0
San Marino	2016	1	0
San Marino	2017	4 (Note: One NonFIFA match)	0
San Marino	2018	6	0
San Marino	2019	4	0
San Marino	2020	3	0
San Marino	2021	11	0
San Marino	2022	8	0
San Marino	2023	9	0
Total		48	0
