= Giulio Muccioli =

Pharmacologist and bioanalyst

- Born: 1978 (age 47–48)
- Other name: Giulio G. Muccioli (in publications)
- Education: University of Louvain (Belgium)
- Known for: Endocannabinoid receptors research
- Scientific career
- Fields: Pharmacology, Bioanalysis
- Workplaces: University of Louvain (Belgium)
- Thesis: Substituted 2-thioxoimidazolidin-4-ones and imidazolidine-2,4-diones as modulators of the endocannabinoid system (2005)
- Doctoral advisor: Prof. Didier Lambert

Giulio Muccioli (born in 1978) is a pharmacologist and bioanalyst who is professor and director of research at the University of Louvain (Belgium). He is recognized as a world expert in endocannabinoid receptors. His research is focused on the roles of bioactive lipids both in physiological and pathological situations, mainly related to inflammation.

== Education ==
Giulio Muccioli studied pharmacy at the University of Louvain. He graduated in 2001 and pursued doctoral studies in pharmaceutical sciences, focusing on synthesis and pharmacological evaluation of compounds interacting with the endocannabinoid system. He obtained his Ph.D. in 2005 under the guidance of Prof. Didier Lambert. After that, he completed from 2005 to 2007 a Post-Doctoral Fellowship in the laboratory of Prof. Nephi Stella at the University of Washington (Seattle, USA), specialized in Cannabinoid Pharmacology

== Career ==
Giulio Muccioli returned to the University of Louvain, first as an F.R.S.-FNRS Research Fellow (2007–2008). Since 2008 he has been Professor in the Faculty of Pharmacy and Biomedical Sciences.

He created a research group, the Bioanalysis and Pharmacology of Bioactive Lipids (BPBL), within the Louvain Drug Research Institute (LDRI), which he currently leads. His research interests encompass the roles of bioactive lipids both in physiological mechanisms and pathological situations, mainly related to inflammation and related diseases, such as obesity, multiple sclerosis, inflammatory bowel disease or cancer.

In 2016, he became President of The School of Pharmacy (University of Louvain), and vice president of the Louvain Drug Research Institute.

Muccioli is also member of the Pharmacopoeia Commission of the Belgian Federal Agency for Medecines and Health Products (FAMHP).

In 2018, Giulio Muccioli became with the BPBL research group co-organizer of the European Workshop on Lipid Mediators.

== Awards ==
In 2016, Giulio Muccioli received a research award from the Belgian Charcot Foundation for his project to study the effect of NAAA inhibition on the course of experimental autoimmune encephalitis in mice.

In 2018, Giulio Muccioli won the Eugène De Somer Award for upstanding work in fundamental research in the biomedical sciences field.

== Publications ==
Muccioli has published over 150 articles in peer-reviewed journals throughout his thesis and career.
