= Marco Domeniconi =

Sammarinese footballer

Personal information
- Full name: Marco Domeniconi
- Date of birth: 29 January 1984 (age 42)
- Place of birth: San Marino
- Height: 1.76 m (5 ft 9 in)
- Position: Midfielder

Team information
- Current team: Folgore Falciano
- Number: 8

Senior career*
Years	Team	Apps	(Gls)
2001–2003	A.C. Sammaurese		
2003–2005	Valleverde Riccione	36	(0)
2005–2006	A.S.C. Urbino 1921	25	(1)
2006–2008	Real Misano		
2008–2011	Fiorentino	1+	(0+)
2011–2015	A.C. Sammaurese		
2015–2016	Folgore Falciano	18	(3)
2016	A.C. Sammaurese	0	(0)
2016–2021	Folgore Falciano	97	(9)

International career^{‡}
2002	San Marino U19	3	(0)
2003–2006	San Marino U21	5	(0)
2004–2017	San Marino	20	(0)
- * Club domestic league appearances and goals as of 25 June 2022 ‡ National team caps and goals as of 18 July 2020

Marco Domeniconi (born 29 January 1984) is a former Sammarinese footballer who last played as a midfielder for Folgore Falciano and formerly the San Marino national team.

== Career ==
Domeniconi made his debut for San Marino on 28 April 2004 in a friendly match against Liechtenstein, which finished as a 1–0 win.

== Career statistics ==
=== International ===
As of 26 March 2017

San Marino
Year	Apps	Goals
2004	5	0
2005	6	0
2006	2	0
2007	3	0
2016	1	0
2017	3	0
Total	20	0
