= Alex Gasperoni =

Sammarinese footballer

Personal information
- Date of birth: 30 June 1984 (age 42)
- Place of birth: City of San Marino, San Marino
- Height: 1.81 m (5 ft 11 in)
- Position: Midfielder

Senior career*
Years	Team	Apps	(Gls)
2003–2005	San Marino Calcio	2	(0)
2002–2003	→ Mezzolara (loan)	12	(0)
2003–2004	→ Castel San Pietro (loan)	17	(0)
2005–2006	Narnese	1	(0)
2005–2006	Tolentino	9	(0)
2006–2007	Cervia	11	(0)
2007	Murata	2	(0)
2008	Nova Valmarecchia		
2008–2009	Nova Secchiano		
2010–2021	Tre Penne	168	(10)
2019	→ Riccione (loan)		(2)
2021–2023	Libertas	40	(0)
2023–2024	Tre Penne	17	(0)

International career^{‡}
2003–2019	San Marino	48	(1)
- * Club domestic league appearances and goals as of 30 May 2025 ‡ National team caps and goals as of 5 April 2022

Alex Gasperoni (born 30 June 1984) is a former Sammarinese footballer who last played as a midfielder for Tre Penne. He was a Sammarinese international, and represented his country in 46 international appearances between 2003 and 2019. In 2003, he became the youngest international goalscorer for San Marino, at the age of 19 years-old.

== Club career ==
He was part of San Marino-based club side Tre Penne's squad in their 1–0 win over Shirak F.C. of Armenia in the first qualifying round of the 2013–14 UEFA Champions League. It marked the first win by a Sammarinese club side in a UEFA European competition. By 2016, he was captain of the Tre Penne squad. He was captain of the side which reached the final of the Coppa Titano and played La Fiorita. In 2018, his Tre Penne team won the Supercoppa Sammarinese and set a record points tally in an eight team Sanmarinese league, with 50 points, although they suffered defeat in the Coppa Titano final that year.

== International career ==
Gasperoni represented the San Marino national under-21 football team and went on to play international football for the senior San Marino national football team between 2003 and 2019. On 20 August 2003, during a friendly game against Liechtenstein, he scored one goal and became at 19 years 1 months and 21 days his country's youngest goalscorer. He played his final international match for San Marino on 19 November 2019, starting in a 5–0 defeat to Russia.

=== International goals ===
Scores and results list San Marino's goal tally first.

No.	Date	Venue	Opponent	Score	Result	Competition
1	20 August 2003	Rheinpark Stadion, Vaduz, Liechtenstein	Liechtenstein	1–2	2–2	Friendly

== Personal life ==
Outside of his football career, he owns an as electrical company, that specialise in fitting lights in farm buildings.
