= William Guerra =

American-born Sammarinese footballer

Personal information
- Full name: William Marino Guerra
- Date of birth: 24 February 1968 (age 58)
- Place of birth: Detroit, Michigan, United States
- Position: Defender

Senior career*
Years	Team	Apps	(Gls)
1987–88	ASD Tropical Coriano		
1990–1993	Real Montecchio		
1993–1995	San Marino Calcio		
1995–1996	Juvenes/Dogana	17	(0)
1996–1997	San Marino Calcio		
1997–1999	Juvenes/Dogana		
2000–2004	Pennarossa Chiesanuova		

International career
1987–1999	San Marino	40	(0)
1989	San Marino under-21	4	(0)
- * Club domestic league appearances and goals

William Marino Guerra (born 24 February 1968) is a former footballer who played international football for San Marino as a defender. After graduating from the country's youth set-up, he made forty appearances for the San Marino national team, two in 1987 before the country was affiliated to FIFA and thirty-eight FIFA-sanctioned games between 1990 and 1999, making him the nation's tenth most-capped player of all time. Guerra also captained San Marino on five occasions between 1995 and 1997. He split a 16-year club career between teams from Italy and San Marino.

== Club career ==
Guerra began his career in 1987, aged nineteen, with ASD Tropical Coriano in Italy. In 1990–91 he moved to fellow Italian club Real Montecchio. There he spent three seasons, leaving the club in 1993 to join San Marino Calcio, a club based in Serravalle, San Marino, but playing in the Italian divisions. After two league campaigns at San Marino, the defender joined Juvenes/Dogana in 1994–1995. He made seventeen appearances in his first season at Juvenes/Dogana, but then left to resign for San Marino Calcio at the end of the season. After spending 1995–96 at San Marino, Guerra rejoined Juvenes/Dogana, where he remained until the end of the 1998–99. In 2000–01 he transferred to Pennarossa Chiesanuova, another San Marino club. Guerra saw out the rest of his career with Pennarossa, retiring in 2004 at the age of 36.

== International career ==
=== Under-21 ===
Unusually, Guerra appeared for San Marino's senior team before making his under-21 debut. The defender played his first game for the youth team in a 5–0 loss to Switzerland on 6 June 1989 in a 1990 UEFA European Under-21 Football Championship qualifier; Guerra featured in all four of San Marino's games in the tournament. His last appearance for the under-21s came in a 2–0 loss to Italy on 29 November 1989.

=== Senior team ===
Guerra made his unofficial debut for San Marino while playing for ASD Tropical Coriano in a 1987 Mediterranean Games 0–0 draw with Lebanon on 16 September. His official debut came in a FIFA-sanctioned 4–0 loss to Switzerland in a Euro 1992 qualifier on 13 November 1990. Guerra went on to represent San Marino in qualifiers for the 1994 FIFA World Cup, UEFA Euro 1996, 1998 FIFA World Cup and UEFA Euro 2000. He captained his country for the first time in the 7–0 home loss to Russia on 7 June 1995. He was also captain in the games against Greece, in September, and the Faroe Islands in October. Guerra then had to wait until October 1996 to regain the armband, when San Marino played Belgium. Guerra's final game as captain came in a 6–0 loss to Belgium in June 1997.

His last game for San Marino was the 9–0 loss to Spain in a UEFA Euro 2000 qualifier on 4 June 1999. Of Guerra's 40 international appearances, San Marino failed to win any and drew just two.

== Life outside of football ==
While playing football part-time in San Marino and Italy, Guerra worked as a house painter and decorator, a job he still does today. In 1996, ahead of 1998 FIFA World Cup qualifiers against Wales, he pledged "If we take a point off Wales, then I will paint all [my friends'] houses for free". However, San Marino lost 5–0 at home and 6–0 in Cardiff.
