= Pascal Bollini =

French footballer (born 1966)

Personal information
- Full name: Pascal Bollini
- Date of birth: February 15, 1966 (age 60)
- Place of birth: Jarny, France
- Height: 1.82 m (5 ft 11 1/2 in)
- Position: Forward

Senior career*
Years	Team	Apps	(Gls)
1985–1987	Sedan	46	(1)
1987–1992	Reims	80	(8)
1992–1994	Chamois Niortais	34	(2)
- * Club domestic league appearances and goals

Pascal Bollini (born February 15, 1966) is a former professional footballer.
