= Platt Gollings =

English footballer

Personal information
- Full name: Platts Shadrach Gollings
- Date of birth: 1878
- Place of birth: Winson Green, England
- Date of death: 1935 (aged 56–57)
- Position: Wing half

Senior career*
Years	Team	Apps	(Gls)
1898–1899	Hereford Thistle		
1899–1901	West Bromwich Albion	5	(0)
1901–1904	Brierley Hill Alliance		
1905	Hereford Town		
Total		5	(0)
- * Club domestic league appearances and goals

Platts Shadrach Gollings (1878–1935) was an English footballer who played in the Football League for West Bromwich Albion.
