= Fausto Eliseo Coppini =

Italian painter

Fausto Eliseo Coppini (born in 1870 in Milan, Italy – Buenos Aires, Argentina, 1945) was an Italian-Argentine painter.

== Biography ==
Coppini was born in Milan and studied art at the Brera Academy. In 1888, he moved to South America traveling through Chile and Peru. After a brief sojourn in Italy, he permanently settled in Buenos Aires.

In 1888–1889, he won a silver medal at the International Exhibition for the 100th Anniversary of Argentina. Among his pupils were Ángel Vena, Rodolfo Franco, Gastón Jarry, and Atilio Malinverno.
