= Paolo Mariotti =

Sammarinese footballer

Personal information
- Full name: Paolo Mariotti
- Date of birth: 5 November 1979 (age 46)
- Height: 1.76 m (5 ft 9 in)
- Position: Midfielder

Senior career*
Years	Team	Apps	(Gls)
1999–2006	Pennarossa		
2006–2007	Polisportiva Lunano		
2006–2007	Fiorita	3	(0)
2007–2018	Pennarossa	122	(0)

International career
2006–2007	San Marino	4	(0)
- * Club domestic league appearances and goals

Paolo Mariotti (born 5 November 1979) is a Sammarinese former footballer who played as a midfielder. He made four appearances for the San Marino national team.
