= Pierluigi Benedettini =

Sammarinese former footballer

Personal information
- Date of birth: August 18, 1961 (age 65)
- Place of birth: Murata, San Marino
- Height: 6 ft 3 in (1.91 m)
- Position: Goalkeeper

Senior career*
Years	Team	Apps	(Gls)
1985–1988	AC San Marino		
1990–1994	Juvenes		

International career
1990–1995	San Marino	25	(0)
- * Club domestic league appearances and goals

Pierluigi Benedettini (born August 18, 1961) is a former Sammarinese footballer Who played as a goalkeeper. Like many players from San Marino, he was an amateur and worked as a bus driver.

He is the father of Simone Benedetti who also became an International goalkeeper in 2019, and the uncle of Elia Benedetti.

Benedetti made 25 appearances for the San Marino national team From 1990 to 1995. In 1992, he conceded 10 goals for San Marino against Norway in the World Cup Qualification European section Group 2 match at the Ullevall Stadium in Oslo.
