= Maicol Berretti =

Sammarinese footballer

Personal information
- Date of birth: 1 May 1989 (age 37)
- Place of birth: San Marino, San Marino
- Position: Midfielder

Youth career
- San Marino Calcio

Senior career*
Years	Team	Apps	(Gls)
2007–2008	Santarcangelo	24	(0)
2008–2009	Real Montecchio	20	(0)
2009–2010	P.D. Castellarano	18	(0)
2010–2014	Pennarossa	39	(3)
2014–2016	Folgore	11	(0)
2016–2022	Libertas	76	(3)
2022–2023	Pennarossa	15	(0)
Total		146	(6)

International career^{‡}
2007–2017	San Marino	26	(0)
- * Club domestic league appearances and goals as of 1 June 2024 ‡ National team caps and goals as of 8 October 2017

Maicol Berretti (born 1 May 1989) is a former Sammarinese footballer who last played as a midfielder for Pennarossa.

Berretti made his senior national team debut on 21 November 2007, in an UEFA Euro 2008 qualifier match against Slovakia.
