= Golling an der Erlauf =

- Municipality
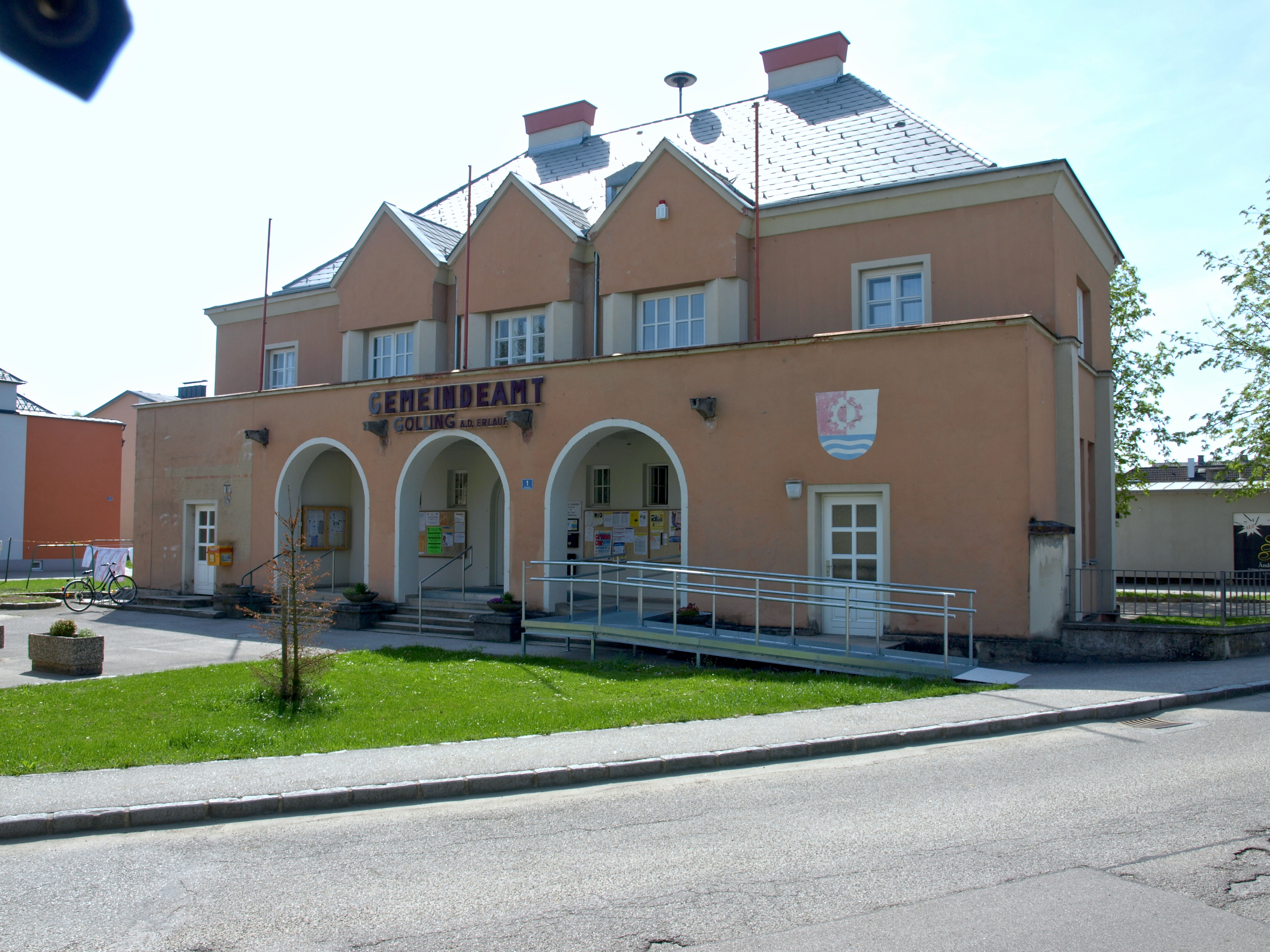
- Golling an der Erlauf town hall

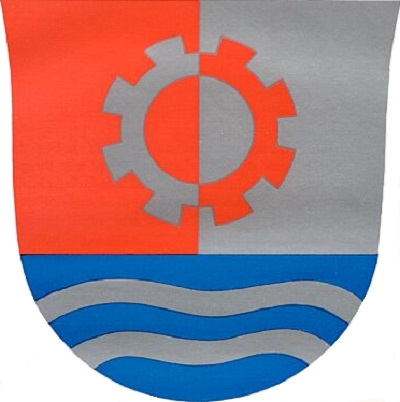
- Coat of arms

- Location within Austria
- Coordinates: 48°12′N 15°11′E
- Country: Austria
- State: Lower Austria
- District: Melk

Government
  - Mayor: Theodor Fischer

Area
  - Total: 2.71 km^{2} (1.05 sq mi)
- Elevation: 215 m (705 ft)

Population (2018-01-01)
  - Total: 1,514
  - Density: 559/km^{2} (1,450/sq mi)
- Time zone: UTC+1 (CET)
  - Summer (DST): UTC+2 (CEST)
- Postal code: 3381
- Area code: 02757
- Website: www.golling-erlauf.gv.at

Golling an der Erlauf is a town in the district of Melk in the Austrian state of Lower Austria.

== Population ==
Historical population
| Year | Pop. | ±% |
|---|---|---|
| 1971 | 1,620 | — |
| 1981 | 1,632 | +0.7% |
| 1991 | 1,614 | −1.1% |
| 2001 | 1,699 | +5.3% |
