= Simone Bacciocchi =

Sammarinese former footballer (born 1977)

Simone Bacchiocchi
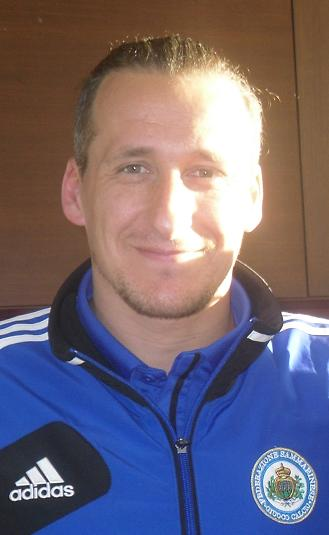

Personal information
- Full name: Simone Bacciocchi
- Date of birth: 22 January 1977 (age 49)
- Place of birth: San Marino
- Position: Defender

Senior career*
Years	Team	Apps	(Gls)
1997–2000	Torre Pedrera		
2000–2006	S.P. Domagnano		
2002–2003	→ AC Tropical Coriano (loan)		
2006–2009	Sporting Novafeltria		
2009–2010	S.P. Domagnana	12	(0)
2010–2012	A.C. Juvenes/Dogana	23	(2)
2012–2013	S.S. San Giovanni	18	(3)
2013–2015	A.C. Libertas	1	(0)
Total		54	(5)

International career
1997–2013	San Marino	60	(0)
- * Club domestic league appearances and goals

Simone Bacciocchi (born 22 January 1977) is a Sammarinese former footballer who played for Sporting Novafeltria and numerous other clubs in San Marino.

Bacciocchi made 60 appearances for the San Marino national football team.
