= Matteo Bugli =

Sammarinese footballer

Personal information
- Full name: Matteo Bugli
- Date of birth: 10 March 1983 (age 43)
- Place of birth: San Marino
- Position: Midfielder

Senior career*
Years	Team	Apps	(Gls)
2003–2006	Domagnano		
2006–2009	Olympia Secchiano		
2009	Verucchio		
2009–2010	Murata	5	(0)
2010–2015	Cosmos	91	(4)
2015–2018	San Giovanni	33	(1)

International career^{‡}
2006–2011	San Marino	17	(0)
- * Club domestic league appearances and goals ‡ National team caps and goals as of 18 July 2020

Matteo Bugli (born 10 March 1983) is a retired Sammarinese footballer who played for the San Marino national football team.
