= Matteo Coppini =

Sammarinese footballer

Personal information
- Date of birth: May 5, 1989 (age 37)
- Position: Midfielder

Team information
- Current team: Campitello

Senior career*
Years	Team	Apps	(Gls)
2007–2008	AS Narnese	2	(0)
2010–2011	Atletico Montecchio		
2011–2012	Polisportiva Campitello Terni		
2012–2014	Strettura '87 Calcio		
2014–2016	AS Amerina		
2016–2020	Campitello		

International career^{‡}
2010–2016	San Marino	14	(0)
- * Club domestic league appearances and goals as of 25 June 2022 ‡ National team caps and goals as of 18 July 2020

Matteo Coppini (born 5 May 1989) is a Sammarinese footballer who last played for Campitello.

== Career ==
He has been capped by the San Marino national football team and made his international debut in 2010.

== Personal life ==
Outside of football he worked for an olive oil company.
