= Riccardo Muccioli =

Sammarinese footballer

Personal information
- Date of birth: 27 August 1974 (age 52)
- Place of birth: San Marino
- Position: Midfielder

Team information
- Current team: USC Baracca Lugo 1909

Senior career*
Years	Team	Apps	(Gls)
2002–2003	SC Faetano		
2003–2006	USC Baracca Lugo 1909		
2006–2012	U.S. Savarna		

International career^{‡}
1996–2009	San Marino	28	(0)
- * Club domestic league appearances and goals as of 18 July 2020 ‡ National team caps and goals as of 18 July 2020

Riccardo Muccioli (born 27 August 1974) is a retired international footballer from San Marino who last played club football for U.S. Savarna in Italy. He previously played for SC Faetano and USC Baracca Lugo 1909.
