= Aldo Junior Simoncini =

Sammarinese footballer

Personal information
- Date of birth: 30 August 1986 (age 40)
- Place of birth: City of San Marino, San Marino
- Position: Goalkeeper

Senior career*
| Years | Team | Apps | (Gls) |
| 2004–2005 | Modena | 0 | (0) |
| 2005–2006 | Valleverde Riccione | 15 | (0) |
| 2006–2009 | San Marino Calcio | 3 | (0) |
| 2009–2011 | Bellaria Igea | 44 | (0) |
| 2011–2012 | Cesena | 0 | (0) |
| 2012 | → Valenzana (loan) | 0 | (0) |
| 2012–2018 | A.C. Libertas | 104 | (0) |
| 2018–2022 | S.P. Tre Fiori | 76 | (0) |
| 2022–2024 | S.S. Cosmos | 64 | (0) |

International career^{‡}
| 2006–2023 | San Marino | 65 | (0) |
- * Club domestic league appearances and goals as of 31 May 2025 ‡ National team caps and goals as of 20 November 2023 (UTC)

Aldo Junior Simoncini (born 30 August 1986) is a former Sammarinese footballer who played as a goalkeeper.

== Club career ==
At the age of 19 his career was nearly ended after he suffered serious injuries in a car crash.

Simoncini was signed by Italian club Cesena in 2011. In January 2012 he was signed by Valenzana on a loan deal.

== International career ==
Simoncini and his twin brother, Davide, both scored an own goal each against Sweden on 7 September 2010, becoming the first twins to accomplish such a feat in an international competition.

== Personal life ==
Simoncini combined his football career with a job as an accountant, and also as a computer engineer.
