= Federico Gasperoni =

Sammarinese footballer and cyclist

Federico "Gassers" Gasperoni
Personal information
- Born: 10 September 1976 (age 50) City of San Marino, San Marino

Cycling career
- Sport: Cycling
Medal record
Men's road cycling
Representing San Marino
Games of the Small States of Europe
Gold medal – first place	2017 San Marino	Team road race

Federico Gasperoni (born 10 September 1976) is a Sammarinese footballer and cyclist. He played as a goalkeeper with the San Marino national football team. He was previously one of the most capped players along with Mirco Gennari at 41 international caps.

He competed at the 2011 Games of the Small States of Europe in cycling taking 13th place in the road race. He also competed in the equivalent road races at both the 2013 Games of the Small States of Europe and the 2017 Games of the Small States of Europe.
