= Michele Ceccoli =

Sammarinese footballer

Personal information
- Full name: Michele Ceccoli
- Date of birth: 4 December 1973 (age 52)
- Place of birth: Rome, Italy
- Height: 1.81 m (5 ft 11 in)
- Position: Goalkeeper

Team information
- Current team: Tre Fiori

Senior career*
Years	Team	Apps	(Gls)
1995–2003	Libertas		
2003–2004	US Mercatellese		
2004–2014	Libertas	58	(0)
2014–2018	Tre Fiori	48	(0)

International career
2005	San Marino	3	(0)
- * Club domestic league appearances and goals

Michele Ceccoli (born 4 December 1973) is a Sammarinese former footballer who played as a goalkeeper. He made three appearances the San Marino national team in 2005.
