= Giampaolo Mazza =

Sammarinese footballer and manager

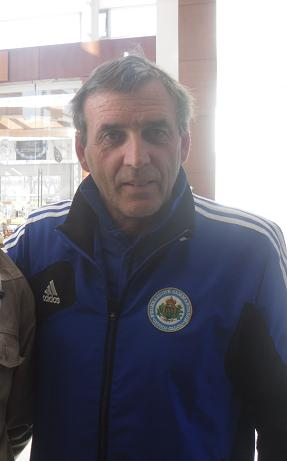
- Mazza in 2013

Personal information
- Full name: Giampaolo Mazza
- Date of birth: 26 February 1956 (age 70)
- Place of birth: Genoa, Italy
- Position: Midfielder

Senior career*
Years	Team	Apps	(Gls)
1985–1988	San Marino Calcio		

Managerial career
- 1998–2013: San Marino
- * Club domestic league appearances and goals

Giampaolo Mazza (born 26 February 1956) is a former manager of the San Marino national football team. Mazza was in charge of the San Marino national team between 1998 and 2013. When not managing the team, Mazza works as a PE teacher at a school near San Marino. A former player who played as a midfielder, he was the longest serving national team manager in Europe, having spent 15 years managing San Marino. However, he retired in October, 2013 after only winning one game in his tenure.

Mazza was born in Genoa, Italy. Before going into management at the age of 21, Mazza was a player for Italian Serie C club San Marino Calcio. He was capped five times by San Marino in 1991.

== Managerial statistics ==
As of 15 October 2013.

Team	From	To	Record				
Team	From	To	G	W	D	L	Win %
San Marino	January 1998	October 2013	83	1	3	79	1.20
