= Gianluca Bollini =

Sammarinese footballer

Personal information
- Full name: Gianluca Bollini
- Date of birth: 24 March 1980 (age 46)
- Place of birth: City of San Marino, San Marino
- Height: 1.90 m (6 ft 3 in)
- Position: Centre-back

Senior career*
Years	Team	Apps	(Gls)
–2009	Sporting NovaValmarecchia		
2009–2010	Murata	19	(0)
2010–2015	La Fiorita	98	(11)
2015–2016	Folgore	15	(0)
2016–2017	La Fiorita	12	(0)

International career
2007–2013	San Marino	10	(0)
- * Club domestic league appearances and goals

Gianluca Bollini (born 24 March 1980) is a Sammarinese footballer who played as a centre-back for the San Marino national team.
