= Fabio Bollini =

Sammarinese footballer

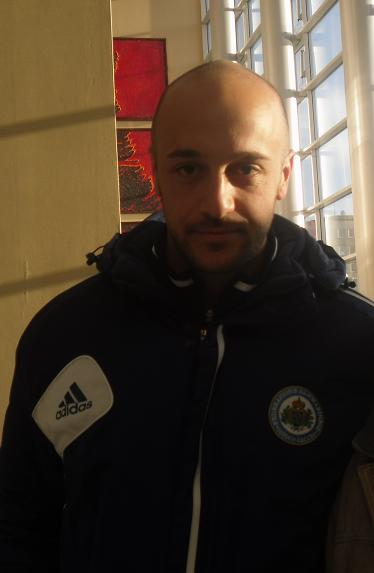

Personal information
- Date of birth: September 19, 1983 (age 43)
- Place of birth: San Marino
- Position: Midfielder

Senior career*
| Years | Team | Apps | (Gls) |
| 2003–2004 | S.P. Cailungo | | |
| 2004–2006 | S.P. Tre Fiori | | |
| 2006–2007 | S.S. Murata | | |
| 2007–2009 | La Fiorita | | |
| 2009–2010 | S.S. Murata | 18 | (1) |
| 2010–2014 | La Fiorita | 46 | (9) |
| 2014–2015 | Domagnano | | |
| 2015–2016 | Folgore | 26 | (3) |
| 2016–2017 | Libertas | | |

International career^{‡}
| 2007–2013 | San Marino | 14 | (0) |
- * Club domestic league appearances and goals as of 18 July 2020 ‡ National team caps and goals as of 18 July 2020

Fabio Bollini (born 19 September 1983) is a former defender from San Marino. He last played for Libertas and also featured for the San Marino national football team.
