= San Marino Calcio =

Association football club in San Marino

- Full name: Associazione Calcistica Victor San Marino
- Nickname: Titani (The Titans)
- Founded: 1960; 63 years ago, (as Società Sportiva Serenissima); 2021; 5 years ago as ASD Victor San Marino
- Ground: Stadio di Acquaviva; Acquaviva, San Marino
- Capacity: 515
- President: Luca Della Balda
- Manager: Oberdan Biagioni
- League: Eccellenza Emilia-Romagna
- 2024–25: Serie D/D, 12th of 18
- Website: acsanmarinocalcio.sm
Home colours	Away colours	Third colours

Associazione Calcistica San Marino Calcio, better known as San Marino or San Marino Calcio, is a Sammarinese football club based in the city of Acquaviva, that competes in the Eccellenza, the fifth tier of Italian football, since being relegated in 2026.

The original club was founded in 1960 as S.S. Serenissima (Società Sportiva Serenissima), before merging with S.S. Juvenes in 1973, changing its name to A.C. San Marino (Associazione Calcio San Marino), after which it changed its name to, San Marino Calcio in 1988, and again in 2021 to A.S.D. Victor San Marino (Associazione Sportiva Dilettantistica Victor San Marino), reverting back to A.C. San Marino Calcio in 2024. It is the only football club based in the Republic of San Marino authorized by the FIGC to compete in the Italian football league The club colours are sky blue and white, reminiscent of the Sammarinese flag.

Historically, the highest level reached by the club was the Italian third tier, with a highest finish of tenth place. This makes it, therefore, the only Sanmarinese football team to have played in a professional league, as the national tournament of San Marino is at an amateur level. Since the club is a full member of the Italian league system, it would hypothetically represent Italy in continental competitions, rather than its home country.

On 4 July 2019 the sports title of the San Marino Calcio is transferred to the Cattolica Calcio, which takes the name of "Cattolica Calcio San Marino" and which is admitted to the Serie D championship. The company retained its legal and administrative headquarters in the Republic of San Marino, but sporting activity took place in Cattolica and the colors become yellow and red. In 2021, the team was refounded to represent San Marino in the Italian league system. After which, they got promoted to Serie D, which they will be competing in the 2023–24 season.

== History ==
The club was founded as Società Sportiva Serenissima in 1960 by the San Marino Football Federation, in order to have a team representing the Republic of San Marino in the Italian league. The club was later purchased by Sammarinese and Italian entrepreneurs.

The foundation year is still disputed, mainly due to another team sponsored (but not owned) by the San Marino Football Federation, called Libertas-Tre Penne, having taken part in the Italian championship in 1959. The crest of Tre Penne is still visible on that of San Marino Calcio. Serenissima also inherited Libertas-Tre Penne's colors.

San Marino Calcio is the only professional football team in the Republic of San Marino that is allowed to play exclusively in the Italian football league system. Since the San Marino Football League is completely amateur, the club is also the only professional team in the Republic. Another team from San Marino, A.C. Juvenes/Dogana, competed in both the amateur levels of Italian football and in the Sammarinese league in the past, but has since withdrawn from the FIGC.

=== Early years ===
A.C. San Marino began playing in 1960 in the Seconda Categoria, since the Terza Categoria did not exist in the Italian football league system at that time. After being promoted from the Seconda and Prima Categoria, the team began playing in the higher level, the Promozione, before being relegated to the Prima Categoria in the 1976–77 season. They continued to play in the Prima Categoria for the next four seasons, until they won the championship and were promoted back to the Promozione in the 1979–80 season. A.C. San Marino's stay in the Promozione was short-lived, however, as they were relegated to the Prima Categoria within the next two seasons.

The team established themselves as a yo-yo club as they were once again promoted to the Promozione as champions in the 1984–85 season. The team then saw back-to-back championships as they won the Promozione the following season, and were promoted for the first time to the Serie D, the highest amateur league in Italy. San Marino's success continued as they finished in second place in Serie D in the 1986–87 season, a championship they went on to win in the following year. In the 1988–89 season, the team appeared in the lowest level of the Italian professional league (Serie C2) for the first time.

In 1988, A.C. San Marino became a joint stock company and changed its name from A.C. San Marino to San Marino Calcio. The renamed team was relegated to Serie D in the 1989–90 season after finishing second-last in Serie C2. After finishing 17th in the 1991–92 season, San Marino Calcio were relegated again, this time to the Eccellenza, but were again promoted to Serie D in the 1992–93 season. In the 1995–96 season, San Marino Calcio was relegated to Eccellenza again after a three-year stay in Serie D, but it was promoted again in the 1996–97 season.

The club's success was due in part to the appointment of the San Marino national football team manager Giampaolo Mazza, who led them to two non-consecutive Eccellenza championships. In the 1999–2000 season, San Marino Calcio were promoted to the Serie C2 as champions of Serie D.

=== Post millennium ===
San Marino Calcio began the new millennium in the fourth level of Italian professional football, receiving a major boost with the arrival of the legendary San Marino international Andy Selva. Napoli (old Napoli, which went bankrupt in 2004) also took over the club as an investor in 2000 but re-sold it in November 2002. San Marino Calcio consolidated their place in Serie C2 by finishing in the top half of the league standings for the next three seasons. The team was able to reach the 2003–04 play-off final, but was defeated, and remained in Serie C2 after finishing fourth in the league. San Marino Calcio's 2004–05 season was more successful: they were victorious in the play-off final, and thus reached Lega Pro Prima Divisione (formerly Serie C1) for the first time. The team was relegated again to Lega Pro Seconda Divisione during the 2006–07 season.

In December 2006, Werther Cornieti, the chairman of the club, left due to controversial allegations and criticism during a sports broadcast. Daniele De Luigi was later confirmed as the new chairman of San Marino Calcio.

In the season 2011–12, it was promoted from Lega Pro Seconda Divisione to Lega Pro Prima Divisione. The club remained at that level for three seasons but was relegated to Serie D after finishing last in the 2014–15 season. In 2023, the club was promoted back to Serie D after finishing at the top of the Eccellenza Emilia-Romagna Group B.

== Colours and badge ==
The club's home kit consists of a light blue shirt with white and black inserts, black shorts, and black socks. Their away kit consists of a white shirt with dark blue inserts, white shorts, and black socks. San Marino Calcio has released a third kit for merchandising, consisting of a red shirt with dark blue inserts, red shorts, and red socks.

The golden frame of their badge contains the team name and the phrase "Titanus aggressurus Olympum", which refers to the Titans in Greek mythology. Pictured in the center of the badge is a Titan. In Italian, the word "Titan" signifies both the race of mythological gods and Monte Titano, the highest point in San Marino. The left-hand circle represents the badge of Tre Penne, one of San Marino Calcio's two founding teams, and the right-hand circle represents the old San Marino Calcio badge.

== Home stadium ==
=== San Marino Stadium ===
The Olympic Stadium was the home of San Marino Calcio (currently Victor San Marino) until 2019. The stadium is located in Serravalle and was constructed in 1969. It is also home to the San Marino national football team and, in the past, to the Serravalle-based football club A.C. Juvenes/Dogana. The Olympic Stadium is an all-seater stadium and has a capacity of 6,664.

=== Stadio di Acquaviva ===
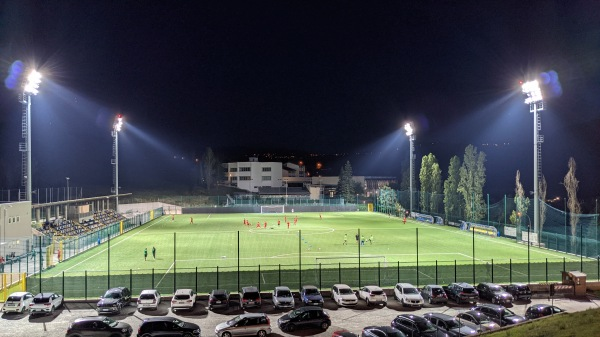
Stadio di acquaviva

The Stadio di Acquaviva has been the home to the first team of San Marino Calcio since it opened in 2019. It has enough seating for 500 people, FIFA Quality PRO Artificial Turf, three TV boxes, and a dedicated press area.

== Players ==
=== Current squad ===
As of 23 June 2025

Note: Flags indicate national team as defined under FIFA eligibility rules; some limited exceptions apply. Players may hold more than one non-FIFA nationality.

No.	Pos.	Nation	Player
-	GK	ITA	Gianmarco Pazzini
-	GK	ITA	Paolo Branduani
-	GK	ITA	Francisco Lattisi
-	GK	ITA	Ruben Rinaldini
-	GK	ITA	Lorenzo Innocenti
-	DF	ITA	Mirco Biguzi
-	DF	ITA	Jacopo Di Lauro
-	DF	SMR	Filippo Fabbri
-	DF	ITA	Gabriele Iobbi
-	DF	ITA	Francesco Mezzasoma
-	DF	SMR	Alessandro Tosi
-	DF	UKR	Sergio Yakubiv

No.	Pos.	Nation	Player
-	MF	ITA	Alessio Arcopinto
-	MF	ITA	Alessandro Carlini
-	MF	NGR	Adamu Haruna
-	MF	ITA	Andrea Miglietta
-	MF	ITA	Alessandro Muro
-	MF	ITA	Simone Pasa
-	MF	SEN	Baye Bass Thioune
-	MF	GUI	Amadou Touré

No.	Pos.	Nation	Player
-	FW	ITA	Davide Di Francesco
-	FW	ITA	Massimiliano Gennari
-	FW	ITA	Gabriele Gibilterra
-	FW	ITA	Filippo Guidobaldi
-	FW	GAM	Kalifa Manneh
-	FW	LBR	Abubaka Morris Passewe
-	FW	ALB	Andrea Sollaku

== Management ==
=== Management ===
Position	Staff
President	(Italy) Emiliano Montanari
General Manager	(Italy) Gino Montella
Sporting Director	(Italy) Daniele Deoma
Secretary	(Italy) Simone Celli
Press Office Manager	(Italy) Cristiano Sabatini

Last updated: 23 June 2025
Source: San Marino Calcio (in Italian)

=== Technical Staff ===
Position	Staff
Manager	(Italy) Oberdan Biagioni
Coach	(San Marino) Giampaolo Mazza
Coach	(Italy) Christian Celli
Goalkeeping Coach	(Italy) Daniele Bova
Match Analyst	(Italy) Andres Cola
Athletic Trainer	(Italy) Emanuele Ciabocco
Massage Therapist	(Italy) Andrea Caruso

Last updated: 23 June 2025
Source: San Marino Calcio (in Italian)

=== Youth Staff ===
Position	Staff
Manager	(Italy) Gianni Belli
Assistant Coach	(Italy) Christian Celli
Goalkeeeping Coach	(Italy) Luca Lelli

Last updated: 23 June 2025
Source: San Marino Calcio (in Italian)

== Honours ==
As of 8 May 2012

- Serie C2
  - Champions:
  - Runner-up: 2011–12
  - Promoted by Play–offs 1: 2004–05 (it)
- Lega Pro Seconda Divisione
  - Champions:
  - Runners-up 1: 2011–12 (promoted)
  - Promoted by Play–offs:
- Serie D
  - Champions 2: 1987–88 (it), 1999–2000 (it)
  - Runners-up 1: 1986–87 (it)
- Eccellenza Emilia-Romagna
  - Champions 2: 1992–93 (it), 1996–1997, 2022-23(it)
- Promozione Emilia-Romagna
  - Champions 1: 1985–86 (it)
- Prima Categoria
  - Champions 2: 1979–80, 1984–85
