= Lithuania national football team results (2020–present) =

- Win Draw Loss Cancelled

This article provides details of international football games played by the Lithuania national football team from 2020 to present.

== Results ==
=== 2020 ===
4 September 2020 2020–21 Nations League	Lithuania	0–2	Kazakhstan	Vilnius, Lithuania
19:00 UTC+3		Report	Zaynutdinov 4'; Kuat 86'	Stadium: LFF Stadium; Attendance: 0 (Note: Due to the COVID-19 pandemic in Europe, all matches scheduled for September 2020 were played behind closed doors.); Referee: Rade Obrenovič (Slovenia)

7 September 2020 2020–21 Nations League	Albania	0–1	Lithuania	Tirana, Albania
20:45 UTC+2		Report	Kazlauskas 51'	Stadium: Arena Kombëtare; Attendance: 0 Referee: Serhiy Boyko (Ukraine)

7 October 2020 Friendly	Estonia	1–3	Lithuania	Tallinn, Estonia
19:00 UTC+3	Marin 58'	Report	Novikovas 14', 46'; Sirgėdas 32'	Stadium: Lilleküla Stadium; Attendance: 718; Referee: Antti Munukka (Finland)

11 October 2020 2020–21 Nations League	Lithuania	2–2	Belarus	Vilnius, Lithuania
19:00 UTC+3	Novikovas 7'; Laukžemis 75'	Report	Lisakovich 59' (pen.); Sachywka 66'	Stadium: LFF Stadium; Attendance: 963; Referee: Julian Weinberger (Austria)

14 October 2020 2020–21 Nations League	Lithuania	0–0	Albania	Vilnius, Lithuania
19:00 UTC+3		Report		Stadium: LFF Stadium; Attendance: 696; Referee: Karim Abed (France)

11 November 2020 Friendly	Lithuania	2–1	Faroe Islands	Vilnius, Lithuania
19:00 UTC+2	Sirgėdas 42', 45+1'	Report	Vatnhamar 90+2'	Stadium: LFF Stadium; Attendance: 0 Referee: Aleksandrs Anufrijevs (Latvia)

15 November 2020 2020–21 Nations League	Belarus	2–0	Lithuania	Minsk, Belarus
20:00 UTC+3	Yablonskiy 5'; Ebong 20'	Report		Stadium: Dinamo Stadium; Attendance: 1,985; Referee: Chris Kavanagh (England)

18 November 2020 2020–21 Nations League	Kazakhstan	1–2	Lithuania	Almaty, Kazakhstan
21:00 UTC+6	Aimbetov 38'	Report	Vorobjovas 40'; Novikovas 90+4'	Stadium: Central Stadium; Attendance: 0 Referee: Hüseyin Göçek (Turkey)

=== 2021 ===
24 March 2021 Friendly	Kosovo	4–0	Lithuania	Pristina, Kosovo
20:45 UTC+2	Zeneli 27', 71'; Muriqi 63'; Halimi 79'	Report		Stadium: Fadil Vokrri Stadium; Attendance: 0 Referee: Enea Jorgji (Albania)

28 March 2021 2022 World Cup qualification	Switzerland	1–0	Lithuania	St. Gallen, Switzerland
21:00 UTC+2 (Note: The match, originally to be played at 20:45 UTC+2, was delayed by 15 minutes because a wrong-sized goal had to be replaced.)	Shaqiri 2'	Report		Stadium: Kybunpark; Attendance: 0 Referee: Mattias Gestranius (Finland)

31 March 2021 2022 World Cup qualification	Lithuania	0–2	Italy	Vilnius, Lithuania
21:45 UTC+3		Report	Sensi 48'; Immobile 90+4' (pen.)	Stadium: LFF Stadium; Attendance: 0 Referee: Paweł Raczkowski (Poland)

1 June 2021 2020 Baltic Cup	Lithuania	0–1	Estonia	Vilnius, Lithuania
18:00 UTC+3		Report	Anier 59'	Stadium: LFF Stadium; Attendance: 0 Referee: Aleksandrs Anufrijevs (Latvia)

4 June 2021 2020 Baltic Cup	Latvia	3–1	Lithuania	Riga, Latvia
19:00 UTC+3	Beneta 37' (o.g.); Emsis 69'; Uldriķis 85'	Report	Golubickas 67'	Stadium: Daugava Stadium; Attendance: 0 Referee: Juri Frischer (Estonia)

8 June 2021 Friendly	Spain	4–0	Lithuania	Leganés, Spain
20:45 UTC+2	Guillamón 3'; Brahim 24'; Miranda 54'; Puado 73'	Report		Stadium: Estadio Municipal de Butarque; Attendance: 903; Referee: Willy Delajod (France)

2 September 2021 2022 World Cup qualification	Lithuania	1–4	Northern Ireland	Vilnius, Lithuania
21:45 UTC+3	Baravykas 55'	Report	Ballard 20'; Washington 52' (pen.); Lavery 67'; McNair 82' (pen.)	Stadium: LFF Stadium; Attendance: 1,612; Referee: Stéphanie Frappart (France)

5 September 2021 2022 World Cup qualification	Bulgaria	1–0	Lithuania	Sofia, Bulgaria
19:00 UTC+3	Chochev 82'	Report		Stadium: Vasil Levski National Stadium; Attendance: 2,503; Referee: John Beaton (Scotland)

8 September 2021 2022 World Cup qualification	Italy	5–0	Lithuania	Reggio Emilia, Italy
20:45 UTC+2	Kean 11', 29'; Utkus 14' (o.g.); Raspadori 24'; Di Lorenzo 54'	Report		Stadium: Stadio Città del Tricolore; Attendance: 10,578; Referee: Craig Pawson (England)

9 October 2021 2022 World Cup qualification	Lithuania	3–1	Bulgaria	Vilnius, Lithuania
16:00 UTC+3	Lasickas 18'; Černych 82', 84'	Report	Despodov 64'	Stadium: LFF Stadium; Attendance: 2,526; Referee: Yevhen Aranovskyi (Ukraine)

12 October 2021 2022 World Cup qualification	Lithuania	0–4	Switzerland	Vilnius, Lithuania
21:45 UTC+3		Report	Embolo 31', 45'; Steffen 42'; Gavranović 90+4'	Stadium: LFF Stadium; Attendance: 1,806; Referee: Tiago Martins (Portugal)

12 November 2021 2022 World Cup qualification	Northern Ireland	1–0	Lithuania	Belfast, Northern Ireland
19:45 UTC+0	Šatkus 18' (o.g.)	Report		Stadium: Windsor Park; Attendance: 14,336; Referee: István Vad (Hungary)

15 November 2021 Friendly	Lithuania	1–1	Kuwait	Vilnius, Lithuania
19:00 UTC+2	Lasickas 54'	Report	Ayedh 43'	Stadium: LFF Stadium; Referee: Aleksandrs Anufrijevs (Latvia)

=== 2022 ===
25 March 2022 Friendly	San Marino	1–2	Lithuania	Serravalle, San Marino
20:45 UTC+2	Fabbri 62'	Report	Klimavičius 13'; Mėgelaitis 27'	Stadium: San Marino Stadium; Referee: Deniz Aytekin (Germany)

29 March 2022 Friendly	Republic of Ireland	1–0	Lithuania	Dublin, Ireland
19:45 UTC+1	Parrott 90+7'	Report		Stadium: Aviva Stadium; Attendance: 30,686; Referee: Bram Van Driessche (Belgium)

4 June 2022 2022–23 Nations League	Lithuania	0–2	Luxembourg	Vilnius, Lithuania
19:00 UTC+3		Report	Sinani 44', 78'	Stadium: LFF Stadium; Attendance: 3,009; Referee: David Fuxman (Israel)

7 June 2022 2022–23 Nations League	Lithuania	0–6	Turkey	Vilnius, Lithuania
21:45 UTC+3		Report	Sinik 2', 14'; Dursun 56' (pen.), 81'; Akgün 89'; Dervişoğlu 90+1'	Stadium: LFF Stadium; Attendance: 2,843; Referee: Novak Simović (Serbia)

11 June 2022 2022–23 Nations League	Faroe Islands	2–1	Lithuania	Tórshavn, Faroe Islands
17:00 UTC+1	Davidsen 20' (pen.); Andreasen 45'	Report	Černych 6'	Stadium: Tórsvøllur; Attendance: 2,278; Referee: Igor Pajac (Croatia)

14 June 2022 2022–23 Nations League	Turkey	2–0	Lithuania	İzmir, Turkey
21:45 UTC+3	Ayhan 37'; Çalhanoğlu 54' (pen.)	Report		Stadium: Gürsel Aksel Stadium; Attendance: 14,694; Referee: Stéphanie Frappart (France)

22 September 2022 2022–23 Nations League	Lithuania	1–1	Faroe Islands	Vilnius, Lithuania
21:45 UTC+3	Slivka 41'	Report	Andreasen 22'	Stadium: LFF Stadium; Attendance: 2,376; Referee: Vilhjálmur Alvar Þórarinsson (Iceland)

25 September 2022 2022–23 Nations League	Luxembourg	1–0	Lithuania	Luxembourg, Luxembourg
20:45 UTC+2	Rodrigues 89'	Report		Stadium: Stade de Luxembourg; Attendance: 5,340; Referee: Giorgi Kruashvili (Georgia)

16 November 2022 2022 Baltic Cup	Lithuania	0–0 (5–6 p)	Iceland	Kaunas, Lithuania
16:00 UTC+2		Report		Stadium: Darius and Girėnas Stadium; Attendance: 5,934; Referee: Andris Treimanis (Latvia)
	Penalties
	Girdvainis (penalty scored); Gineitis (penalty scored); Novikovas (penalty scored); Golubickas (penalty scored); Baravykas (penalty scored); Žebrauskas (penalty missed)		(penalty scored) Guðjohnsen; (penalty scored) Þórðarson; (penalty scored) Sigurdsson; (penalty scored) Anderson; (penalty scored) Ingason; (penalty scored) Thrándarson

19 November 2022 2022 Baltic Cup	Estonia	2–0	Lithuania	Tallinn, Estonia
15:00 UTC+2	Zenjov 65'; Peetson 89'	Report		Stadium: A. Le Coq Arena; Attendance: 1,563; Referee: Vitalijs Spasjonņikovs (Latvia)

=== 2023 ===
24 March 2023 Euro 2024 qualifying	Serbia	2–0	Lithuania	Belgrade, Serbia
20:45 UTC+2	Tadić 16'; Vlahović 53'	Report		Stadium: Rajko Mitić Stadium; Attendance: 21,125; Referee: Lawrence Visser (Belgium)

27 March 2023 Friendly	Greece	0–0	Lithuania	Athens, Greece
18:00 UTC+3		Report		Stadium: Agia Sophia Stadium; Attendance: 11,950; Referee: Jonathan Lardot (Belgium)

17 June 2023 Euro 2024 qualifying	Lithuania	1–1	Bulgaria	Kaunas, Lithuania
16:00 UTC+3	Girdvainis 15'	Report	Petkov 27'	Stadium: Darius and Girėnas Stadium; Attendance: 14,230; Referee: Jakob Alexander Sundberg (Denmark)

20 June 2023 Euro 2024 qualifying	Hungary	2–0	Lithuania	Budapest, Hungary
20:45 UTC+2	Varga 32'; Sallai 83'	Report		Stadium: Puskás Aréna; Attendance: 58,274; Referee: António Nobre (Portugal)

7 September 2023 Euro 2024 qualifying	Lithuania	2–2	Montenegro	Kaunas, Lithuania
19:00 UTC+3	Paulauskas 71'; Černych 90+4'	Report	Krstović 78'; Savić 89'	Stadium: Darius and Girėnas Stadium; Attendance: 11,328; Referee: Mohammed Al-Hakim (Sweden)

10 September 2023 Euro 2024 qualifying	Lithuania	1–3	Serbia	Kaunas, Lithuania
21:45 UTC+3	Paulauskas 45'	Report	A. Mitrović 21', 32', 43'	Stadium: Darius and Girėnas Stadium; Attendance: 8,586; Referee: Sascha Stegemann (Germany)

14 October 2023 Euro 2024 qualifying	Bulgaria	0–2	Lithuania	Sofia, Bulgaria
19:00 UTC+3		Report	Širvys 45', 55'	Stadium: Vasil Levski National Stadium; Attendance: 6,916; Referee: Giorgi Kruashvili (Georgia)

17 October 2023 Euro 2024 qualifying	Lithuania	2–2	Hungary	Kaunas, Lithuania
21:45 UTC+3	Černych 20'; Širvys 36'	Report	Szoboszlai 67' (pen.); Varga 82'	Stadium: Darius and Girėnas Stadium; Attendance: 5,349; Referee: Juxhin Xhaja (Albania)

16 November 2023 Euro 2024 qualifying	Montenegro	2–0	Lithuania	Podgorica, Montenegro
20:45 UTC+1	Kuč 3'; Jovetić 48'	Report		Stadium: Podgorica City Stadium; Attendance: 3,647; Referee: Artur Soares Dias (Portugal)

19 November 2023 Friendly	Cyprus	1–0	Lithuania	Limassol, Cyprus
18:00 UTC+2	Pittas 22'	Report		Stadium: Alphamega Stadium; Attendance: 1,169; Referee: Marcel Birsan (Romania)

=== 2024 ===
21 March 2024 2022–23 Nations League play-out	Gibraltar	0–1	Lithuania	Faro/Loulé, Portugal
20:45 UTC+1		Report	Kučys 60'	Stadium: Estádio Algarve; Attendance: 207; Referee: Giorgi Kruashvili (Georgia)

26 March 2024 2022–23 Nations League play-out	Lithuania	1–0 (2–0 agg.)	Gibraltar	Kaunas, Lithuania
19:00 UTC+2	Černych 51'	Report		Stadium: Darius and Girėnas Stadium; Attendance: 6,102; Referee: Duje Strukan (Croatia)
Note: Lithuania won 2–0 on aggregate and remained in League C, while Gibraltar were relegated to League D.

8 June 2024 2024 Baltic Cup	Latvia	0–2	Lithuania	Liepāja, Latvia
16:00 UTC+3		Report	Kučys 49'; Dolžnikov 72'	Stadium: Daugava Stadium; Attendance: 3,505; Referee: Juri Frischer (Estonia)

11 June 2024 2024 Baltic Cup	Lithuania	1–1 (3–4 p)	Estonia	Kaunas, Lithuania
19:00 UTC+3	Matulevicius 84'	Report	Lepik 82'	Stadium: Darius and Girėnas Stadium; Attendance: 5,900; Referee: Andris Treimanis (Latvia)
	Penalties
	Lasickas (penalty missed); Černych (penalty missed); Tutyškinas (penalty scored); Novikovas (penalty scored); Klimavičius (penalty scored)		(penalty scored) Mets; (penalty scored) Lepik; (penalty scored) Palumets; (penalty missed) Sorga; (penalty scored) Vetkal

6 September 2024 2024–25 Nations League	Lithuania	0–1	Cyprus	Marijampolė, Lithuania
20:45 UTC+3		Report	Pittas 34'	Stadium: Sūduva Stadium; Attendance: 4,905; Referee: Igor Pajac (Croatia)

9 September 2024 2024–25 Nations League	Romania	3–1	Lithuania	Bucharest, Romania
21:45 UTC+3	Mihăilă 4'; Marin 87' (pen.); Mitriță 90+2'	Report	Kučys 34'	Stadium: Steaua Stadium; Attendance: 28,168; Referee: Rade Obrenovič (Slovenia)

12 October 2024 2024–25 Nations League	Lithuania	1–2	Kosovo	Kaunas, Lithuania
15:00 UTC+3	Golubickas 84'	Report	Zhegrova 20'; E. Krasniqi 65'	Stadium: Darius and Girėnas Stadium; Attendance: 7,554; Referee: Ondřej Berka (Czech Republic)

15 October 2024 2024–25 Nations League	Lithuania	1–2	Romania	Kaunas, Lithuania
20:45 UTC+3	Kučys 7' (pen.)	Report	R. Marin 18' (pen.); Drăguș 65'	Stadium: Darius and Girėnas Stadium; Attendance: 2,585; Referee: Nick Walsh (Scotland)

15 November 2024 2024–25 Nations League	Cyprus	2–1	Lithuania	Larnaca, Cyprus
21:45 UTC+2	Kastanos 18'; Tzionis 63'	Report	Gineitis 47'	Stadium: AEK Arena – Georgios Karapatakis; Attendance: 1,733; Referee: Nenad Minaković (Serbia)

18 November 2024 2024–25 Nations League	Kosovo	1–0	Lithuania	Pristina, Kosovo
20:45 UTC+1	Jashari 5'	Report		Stadium: Fadil Vokrri Stadium; Attendance: 12,856; Referee: Kristoffer Hagenes (Norway)

=== 2025 ===
21 March 2025 2026 World Cup qualification	Poland	1–0	Lithuania	Warsaw, Poland
20:45	Lewandowski 81'	Report		Stadium: Stadion Narodowy; Attendance: 55,738; Referee: Tasos Sidiropoulos (Greece)

24 March 2025 2026 World Cup qualification	Lithuania	2–2	Finland	Kaunas, Lithuania
21:45	Kučys 39'; Gineitis 69'	Report	Kairinen 3'; Pohjanpalo 17'	Stadium: Darius and Girėnas Stadium; Attendance: 10,421; Referee: Erik Lambrechts (Belgium)

7 June 2025 2026 World Cup qualification	Malta	0–0	Lithuania	Ta' Qali, Malta
18:00		Report		Stadium: National Stadium; Attendance: 2,785; Referee: Marian Barbu (Romania)

10 June 2025 Friendly	Denmark	5–0	Lithuania	Odense, Denmark
19:00 UTC+3	Biereth 12'; Eriksen 18'; Dolberg 23'; Kristensen 48'; Dreyer 62'	Report		Stadium: Odense Stadium; Attendance: 13,087; Referee: Rohit Saggi (Norway)

4 September 2025 2026 World Cup qualification	Lithuania	1–1	Malta	Kaunas, Lithuania
21:45	Gineitis 90+6'	Report	Satariano 83'	Stadium: Darius and Girenas Stadium; Attendance: 7,854; Referee: Giorgi Kruashvili (Georgia)

7 September 2025 2026 World Cup qualification	Lithuania	2–3	Netherlands	Kaunas, Lithuania
19:00	Gineitis 36'; Girdvainis 43'	Report	Depay 11', 63'; Q. Timber 33'	Stadium: Darius and Girenas Stadium; Attendance: 14,797; Referee: Elchin Masiyev (Azerbaijan)

9 October 2025 2026 World Cup qualification	Finland	2–1	Lithuania	Helsinki, Finland
21:45	Källman 48'; Markhiyev 55'	Report	Širvys 25'	Stadium: Helsinki Olympic Stadium; Attendance: 15,819; Referee: Stéphanie Frappart (France)

12 October 2025 2026 World Cup qualification	Lithuania	0–2	Poland	Kaunas, Lithuania
21:45	Szymański 15'; Lewandowski 64'	Report		Stadium: Darius and Girenas Stadium; Attendance: 11,741; Referee: Ondřej Berka (Czech Republic)

13 November 2025 Friendly	Lithuania	0–0	Israel	Kaunas, Lithuania
19:00 UTC+2		Report		Stadium: Darius and Girenas Stadium; Attendance: 0 Referee: Edgars Maļcevs (Latvia)

17 November 2025 2026 World Cup qualification	Netherlands	4–0	Lithuania	Amsterdam, Netherlands
20:45	Reijnders 16'; Gakpo 58' (pen.); Simons 60'; Malen 62'	Report		Stadium: Johan Cruyff Arena; Attendance: 46,913; Referee: Luis Godinho (Portugal)

=== 2026 ===
26 March 2026 Friendly	Moldova	0–2	Lithuania	Chișinău, Moldova
17:00 UTC+2		Report	Lasickas 33'; Gineitis 71'	Stadium: Zimbru Stadium; Attendance: 4,328; Referee: Henrik Nalbandyan (Armenia)

29 March 2026 Friendly	Lithuania	0–2	Georgia	Kaunas, Lithuania
16:00 UTC+3		Report	Mikautadze 70' (pen.), 84'	Stadium: Darius and Girėnas Stadium; Attendance: 7,726; Referee: Vitālijs Spasjoņņikovs (Latvia)

6 June 2026 2026 Baltic Cup	Lithuania	1–1 (5–4 p)	Latvia	Kaunas, Lithuania
16:00 UTC+3	Kučys 28'	Report	Toņiševs 60'	Stadium: Darius and Girėnas Stadium; Attendance: 7,789; Referee: Joonas Jaanovits (Estonia)
	Penalties
	Utkus (penalty scored); Gineitis (penalty scored); Kučys (penalty scored); Michelbrink (penalty missed); Novikovas (penalty scored); Burba (penalty scored)		(penalty scored) Regža; (penalty scored) Ķigurs; (penalty missed) Meļņiks; (penalty scored) Cigaņiks; (penalty scored) Saveļjevs; (penalty missed) Penkevics

9 June 2026 2026 Baltic Cup	Estonia	1–0	Lithuania	Tallinn, Estonia
19:00 UTC+3	Mustmaa 80'	Report		Stadium: A. Le Coq Arena; Attendance: 3,613; Referee: Vitālijs Spasjoņņikovs (Latvia)

24 September 2026 2026–27 Nations League	Liechtenstein	0–2	Lithuania	Vaduz, Liechtenstein
20:45 UTC+2		Report	Michelbrink 53'; Dolžnikov 66'	Stadium: Rheinpark Stadion; Attendance: 1,055; Referee: Ante Čulina (Croatia)

27 September 2026 2026–27 Nations League	Lithuania	1–1	Azerbaijan	Kaunas, Lithuania
16:00 UTC+3	Kučys 9' (pen.)	Report	Emreli 14'	Stadium: Darius and Girėnas Stadium; Attendance: 7,539; Referee: Menelaos Antoniou (Cyprus)

30 September 2026 Friendly	Lithuania	3–0	Andorra	Kaunas, Lithuania
19:00 UTC+3	Ruzgis 21' (pen.); Steponavičius 27'; Kučys 46'	Report		Stadium: Darius and Girėnas Stadium; Attendance: 1,990; Referee: Andris Treimanis (Latvia)

4 October 2026 2026–27 Nations League	Azerbaijan	1–0	Lithuania	Baku, Azerbaijan
17:00 UTC+4	Khaybulayev 25'	Report		Stadium: Neftçi Arena; Attendance: 5,000; Referee: Gustavo Correia (Portugal)

12 November 2026 Friendly	Lithuania	0–0	Suriname	Kaunas, Lithuania
19:00 UTC+2		Report		Stadium: Darius and Girėnas Stadium; Referee: Andris Treimanis (Latvia)

16 November 2026 2026–27 Nations League	Lithuania	2–1	Liechtenstein	Kaunas, Lithuania
19:00 UTC+2	Jankauskas 16'; Ruzgis 50' (pen.)	Report	Sele 60'	Stadium: Darius and Girėnas Stadium; Attendance: 2,276; Referee: Allard Lindhout (Netherlands)

== Upcoming matches ==
The following matches are currently scheduled:

== See also ==
- Lithuania national football team results (1990–2019)
