= 2026–27 UEFA Nations League =

Tournament details
- Dates: League phase: 24 September – 17 November 2026; League A quarter-finals, and League A/B and B/C play-offs: 25–30 March 2027; Nations League Finals: 9–13 June 2027
- Teams: 54

Tournament statistics
- Matches played: 156
- Goals scored: 412 (2.64 per match)
- Attendance: 3,303,758 (21,178 per match)
- Top scorer(s): (England) Harry Kane (8 goals)
- All statistics correct as of 17 November 2026.

The 2026–27 UEFA Nations League is the fifth season of the UEFA Nations League, an international association football competition involving the men's national teams of the member associations of UEFA. The competition is being held from September to November 2026 (league phase), March 2027 (League A quarter-finals, and League A/B and B/C play-offs), and June 2027 (Nations League Finals).

Portugal are the defending champions, having won the 2025 finals.

== Format ==
| League | Teams at start | Promoted teams | Relegated teams | Teams for 2028–29 |
|---|---|---|---|---|
| League A | 16 | —N/a | ▼2–6 | 18 |
| League B | 16 | ▲4–8 | ▼0–4 | 18 |
| League C | 16 | ▲4–8 | —N/a | 18 |
| League D | 6 | ▲6 | —N/a | —N/a |

The UEFA national teams were divided into four leagues, with Leagues A, B, and C featuring sixteen teams each, divided into four groups of four teams, while League D featured six teams divided into two groups of three. The teams were allocated to leagues based on the 2024–25 UEFA Nations League final overall ranking. Each team played six matches within their group, except for teams in League D which played four, using the home-and-away round-robin format on matchdays from September to November 2026.

In the top division, League A, the group winners and runners-up advanced to the quarter-finals, played home-and-away over two legs in March 2027. In each tie, group winners will face a runner-up from a different group, with the group winner hosting the second leg. The four quarter-final winners will qualify for the Nations League Finals, which is played in a knockout format, consisting of the semi-finals, third place play-off and final. The semi-final pairings are determined by means of a draw. The host country will be selected, preferably from among the four qualified teams, by the UEFA Executive Committee, with the winners of the final crowned as the Nations League champions.

Teams also compete for promotion and relegation to a higher or lower league. The group winners in Leagues B and C, as well as all teams in League D, were directly promoted, while the two worst last-placed teams in League A were directly relegated. The competition will also feature promotion/relegation play-offs following the league phase, with the two worst third-placed teams and two best last-placed teams of League A facing the runners-up of League B and the last-placed teams of League B facing the runners-up of League C. The matches will be played home-and-away over two legs in March 2027, with the winners going to the higher league and the losers entering the lower league.

Originally, the format for promotion and relegation would have involved only the group winners of League D being promoted, as well as all last-placed teams in Leagues A and B being relegated alongside the two worst last-placed teams in League C. The promotion/relegation play-offs would have concerned all third-place teams in Leagues A and B and all runners-up in Leagues B and C, with extra play-offs concerning the two best last-places in League C and both runners-up in League D to be held in March 2028. However, due to the changes scheduled for the 2028–29 UEFA Nations League, in which the competition will be reduced from four leagues to three leagues of 18 teams, promotion/relegation was rebalanced to make all three upcoming leagues consist of 18 teams. This made the 2026–27 UEFA Nations League the final edition to include League D.

In all two-legged ties, the higher-ranked teams host the second leg. The team that scores more goals on aggregate is the winner. If the aggregate score is level, extra time is played (the away goals rule is not applied). If the score remains level after extra time, a penalty shoot-out is used to decide the winner.

=== UEFA Euro 2028 qualifying ===
The 2026–27 UEFA Nations League is linked with UEFA Euro 2028 qualifying, providing teams with another chance to qualify for UEFA Euro 2028.

Two to four of the spots for UEFA Euro 2028 (depending on host nation qualification) will be determined through play-offs in March 2028. The play-offs will include the remaining runners-up from the qualifying groups (between two and four, depending on whether hosts are amongst these teams) and the best-ranked non-qualified group winners from the 2026–27 UEFA Nations League. The play-off structure depends on the number of host nation slots used:

- If both reserved host nation slots are used: Eight teams compete in two play-off paths, each with single-leg semi-finals and a final, for two final tournament spots. 4–6 teams will qualify from the Nations League.
- If one reserved host nation slot is used: Twelve teams compete in three play-off paths, each with single-leg semi-finals and a final, for three final tournament spots. 8 or 9 teams will qualify from the Nations League.
- If no reserved host nation slots are used: Eight teams contest four home-and-away play-off ties, with the four winners qualifying for the final tournament. 4 teams will qualify from the Nations League.

Depending on the number of places available, places in the play-offs are allocated as follows:

- The four to nine remaining places are allocated to group winners from Leagues A, B and C of the 2026–27 UEFA Nations League that have not already qualified for the final tournament or the play-offs from the qualifying group stage, based on the interim overall 2026–27 UEFA Nations League rankings.
- If fewer than the required number of group winners of Leagues A, B and C are available to enter the play-offs, the next place is allocated to the League D group winner ranked 49th in the interim overall 2026–27 UEFA Nations League rankings, unless the team in question has already qualified for the final tournament or the play-offs.
- Any remaining play-off places are allocated to the highest-ranking teams in the interim overall 2026–27 UEFA Nations League rankings that have not already qualified for the final tournament or the play-offs.

== Tiebreakers ==
=== Tiebreakers for group ranking ===
If two or more teams in the same group were equal on points on completion of the league phase, the following tie-breaking criteria were applied:

1. Higher number of points obtained in the matches played among the teams in question;
2. Superior goal difference in matches played among the teams in question;
3. Higher number of goals scored in the matches played among the teams in question;
4. If, after having applied criteria 1 to 3, a subset of the teams still had an equal ranking, criteria 1 to 3 were reapplied exclusively to the matches between these teams to determine their final rankings. (Note: When two or more teams were tied on points, criteria 1 to 3 were applied. After these criteria were applied, they may have defined the position of some of the teams involved, but not all of them. For example, if there was a three-way tie on points, the application of the first three criteria may have only broken the tie for one of the teams, leaving the other two teams still tied. In this case, the tiebreaking procedure was resumed, from the beginning, for those teams that were still tied.) If this procedure did not lead to a decision, criteria 5 to 11 applied;
5. Superior goal difference in all group matches;
6. Higher number of goals scored in all group matches;
7. Higher number of away goals scored in all group matches;
8. Higher number of wins in all group matches;
9. Higher number of away wins in all group matches;
10. Lower disciplinary points total in all group matches (1 point for a single yellow card, 3 points for a red card as a consequence of two yellow cards, 3 points for a direct red card, 4 points for a yellow card followed by a direct red card).
11. Higher position in the 2026–27 UEFA Nations League access list.

=== Criteria for league ranking ===
Individual league rankings were established according to the following criteria:

1. Position in the group;
2. Higher number of points;
3. Higher goal difference;
4. Higher number of goals scored;
5. Higher number of goals scored away from home;
6. Higher number of wins;
7. Higher number of wins away from home;
8. Lower disciplinary points total (1 point for a single yellow card, 3 points for a red card as a consequence of two yellow cards, 3 points for a direct red card, 4 points for a yellow card followed by a direct red card).
9. Higher position in the 2026–27 UEFA Nations League access list.

=== Criteria for interim overall ranking ===
Following the completion of the league phase, the interim overall UEFA Nations League rankings were established as follows:

1. The 16 League A teams were ranked 1st to 16th according to their league rankings.
2. The 16 League B teams were ranked 17th to 32nd according to their league rankings.
3. The 16 League C teams were ranked 33rd to 48th according to their league rankings.
4. The 6 League D teams were ranked 49th to 54th according to their league rankings.

=== Criteria for final overall ranking ===
Following the completion of the League A knockout stage and promotion/relegation play-offs, the final overall UEFA Nations League rankings will be established. Within each of the groups listed below, teams will be ordered based on their interim overall ranking.

1. The four Nations League Finals participants are ranked as follows:
  1. The winner is ranked 1st.
  2. The runner-up is ranked 2nd.
  3. The third-placed team is ranked 3rd.
  4. The fourth-placed team is ranked 4th.
2. The four League A quarter-final losers are ranked 5th to 8th.
3. The two League A highest-ranked third-placed teams remain ranked 9th to 10th.
4. The four teams directly promoted to League A, and the four winners of the League A/B play-offs, are ranked 11th to 18th.
5. The two teams directly relegated to League B, and the four losers of the League A/B play-offs, are ranked 19th to 24th.
6. The four League B third-placed teams remain ranked 25th to 28th.
7. The four teams directly promoted to League B, and the four winners of the League B/C play-offs, are ranked 29th to 36th.
8. The four losers of the League B/C play-offs are ranked 37th to 40th.
9. The four League C third-placed teams remain ranked 41st to 44th.
10. The four League C fourth-placed teams remain ranked 45th to 48th.
11. The six League D teams remain ranked 49th to 54th.

== Schedule ==
Below is the schedule of the 2026–27 UEFA Nations League.

| Stage | Round | Dates |
|---|---|---|
| League phase | Matchday 1 | 24–26 September 2026 |
| League phase | Matchday 2 | 27–29 September 2026 |
| League phase | Matchday 3 | 1–3 October 2026 |
| League phase | Matchday 4 | 4–6 October 2026 |
| League phase | Matchday 5 | 12–14 November 2026 |
| League phase | Matchday 6 | 15–17 November 2026 |
| League A quarter-finals and League A/B and B/C play-offs | First leg | 25 & 27 March 2027 |
| League A quarter-finals and League A/B and B/C play-offs | Second leg | 28 & 30 March 2027 |
| Finals | Semi-finals | 9–10 June 2027 |
| Finals | Third place play-off | 13 June 2027 |
| Finals | Final | 13 June 2027 |

The league phase fixture list was confirmed by UEFA on 13 February 2026, the day following the draw.

== Seeding ==
Map showing the league for each national team. League A League B League C League D Team suspended from competition

All 55 UEFA national teams were able to submit an entry into the competition. However, on 28 February 2022, Russia were suspended indefinitely from participating in UEFA and FIFA competitions due to their country's invasion of Ukraine.

The teams which finished bottom of their group in Leagues A and B, as well as the bottom two fourth-placed teams of League C, from the 2024–25 season moved down a league, while the group winners of Leagues B, C, and D moved up. Additionally, the winners of the promotion/relegation play-off ties entered the higher respective league, while the losers played in the lower league. The remaining teams stayed in their respective leagues.

For the 2026–27 draw, teams were seeded based on the 2024–25 Nations League final overall ranking, which took into account the results from the league stage, League A knockout stage, and promotion/relegation play-offs.

The draw for the league phase took place in Brussels, Belgium, on 12 February 2026.

Key
| ▲ | Promoted after previous season |
| ▼ | Relegated after previous season |
| * | Participated in promotion/relegation play-offs |

League A
| Pot | Team | Prv | Rank |
|---|---|---|---|
| 1 | Portugal | | 1 |
| 1 | Spain | | 2 |
| 1 | France | | 3 |
| 1 | Germany | | 4 |
| 2 | Italy | | 5 |
| 2 | Netherlands | | 6 |
| 2 | Denmark | | 7 |
| 2 | Croatia | | 8 |
| 3 | Serbia | * | 9 |
| 3 | Belgium | * | 10 |
| 3 | England | ▲ | 11 |
| 3 | Norway | ▲ | 12 |
| 4 | Wales | ▲ | 13 |
| 4 | Czech Republic | ▲ | 14 |
| 4 | Greece | ▲* | 15 |
| 4 | Turkey | ▲* | 16 |

League C
| Pot | Team | Prv | Rank |
|---|---|---|---|
| 1 | Iceland | ▼* | 33 |
| 1 | Albania | ▼ | 34 |
| 1 | Montenegro | ▼ | 35 |
| 1 | Kazakhstan | ▼ | 36 |
| 2 | Finland | ▼ | 37 |
| 2 | Slovakia | * | 38 |
| 2 | Bulgaria | * | 39 |
| 2 | Armenia | * | 40 |
| 3 | Belarus | | 41 |
| 3 | Faroe Islands | | 42 |
| 3 | Cyprus | | 43 |
| 3 | Estonia | | 44 |
| 4 | Latvia (Note: The identity of the winners and losers of the League C/D promotion/relegation play-offs (involving Gibraltar, Latvia, Luxembourg, and Malta) was unknown at the time of the draw.) | * | 45 |
| 4 | Luxembourg | * | 46 |
| 4 | Moldova | ▲ | 47 |
| 4 | San Marino | ▲ | 48 |

League B
| Pot | Team | Prv | Rank |
|---|---|---|---|
| 1 | Scotland | ▼* | 17 |
| 1 | Hungary | ▼* | 18 |
| 1 | Poland | ▼ | 19 |
| 1 | Israel | ▼ | 20 |
| 2 | Switzerland | ▼ | 21 |
| 2 | Bosnia and Herzegovina | ▼ | 22 |
| 2 | Austria | * | 23 |
| 2 | Ukraine | * | 24 |
| 3 | Slovenia | * | 25 |
| 3 | Georgia | * | 26 |
| 3 | Republic of Ireland | * | 27 |
| 3 | Romania | ▲ | 28 |
| 4 | Sweden | ▲ | 29 |
| 4 | North Macedonia | ▲ | 30 |
| 4 | Northern Ireland | ▲ | 31 |
| 4 | Kosovo | ▲* | 32 |

League D
| Pot | Team | Prv | Rank |
|---|---|---|---|
| 1 | Azerbaijan | ▼ | 49 |
| 1 | Lithuania | ▼ | 50 |
| 1 | Malta | * | 51 |
| 1 | Gibraltar | * | 52 |
| 2 | Liechtenstein | | 53 |
| 2 | Andorra | | 54 |

Suspended from entering the competition
Team
Russia

== League A ==
=== Group A1 ===
| Pos | Team | Pld | W | D | L | GF | GA | GD | Pts | Qualification or relegation | (France) | (Belgium) | (Italy) | (Turkey) |
|---|---|---|---|---|---|---|---|---|---|---|---|---|---|---|
| 1 | France | 6 | 4 | 1 | 1 | 10 | 6 | +4 | 13 | Advance to quarter-finals | — | 4–1 | 1–1 | 2–1 |
| 2 | Belgium | 6 | 4 | 0 | 2 | 12 | 7 | +5 | 12 | Advance to quarter-finals | 0–1 | — | 4–1 | 3–0 |
| 3 | Italy | 6 | 3 | 1 | 2 | 12 | 10 | +2 | 10 | | 3–1 | 0–2 | — | 3–1 |
| 4 | Turkey (R) | 6 | 0 | 0 | 6 | 4 | 15 | −11 | 0 | Relegated to League B | 0–1 | 1–2 | 1–4 | — |

Source: UEFA
(R) Relegated

=== Group A2 ===
| Pos | Team | Pld | W | D | L | GF | GA | GD | Pts | Qualification or relegation | (Germany) | (Netherlands) | (Greece) | (Serbia) |
|---|---|---|---|---|---|---|---|---|---|---|---|---|---|---|
| 1 | Germany | 6 | 3 | 2 | 1 | 11 | 3 | +8 | 11 (Note: Tied on head-to-head points (5). Head-to-head goal difference: Germany +4, Netherlands +2, Greece −6.) | Advance to quarter-finals | — | 5–0 | 0–1 | 2–0 |
| 2 | Netherlands | 6 | 3 | 2 | 1 | 14 | 10 | +4 | 11 | Advance to quarter-finals | 1–1 | — | 7–0 | 2–1 |
| 3 | Greece | 6 | 3 | 2 | 1 | 6 | 10 | −4 | 11 | | 0–0 | 2–2 | — | 1–0 |
| 4 | Serbia | 6 | 0 | 0 | 6 | 4 | 12 | −8 | 0 | Qualification for relegation play-offs | 1–3 | 1–2 | 1–2 | — |

Source: UEFA

=== Group A3 ===
| Pos | Team | Pld | W | D | L | GF | GA | GD | Pts | Qualification or relegation | (England) | (Spain) | (Croatia) | (Czech Republic) |
|---|---|---|---|---|---|---|---|---|---|---|---|---|---|---|
| 1 | England | 6 | 5 | 0 | 1 | 19 | 6 | +13 | 15 (Note: Tied on head-to-head results. Overall goal difference: England +13, Spain +8.) | Advance to quarter-finals | — | 2–3 | 2–1 | 3–0 |
| 2 | Spain | 6 | 5 | 0 | 1 | 16 | 8 | +8 | 15 | Advance to quarter-finals | 2–3 | — | 4–1 | 3–1 |
| 3 | Croatia | 6 | 2 | 0 | 4 | 7 | 17 | −10 | 6 | Qualification for relegation play-offs | 0–7 | 1–2 | — | 2–1 |
| 4 | Czech Republic (R) | 6 | 0 | 0 | 6 | 3 | 14 | −11 | 0 | Relegated to League B | 0–2 | 0–2 | 1–2 | — |

Source: UEFA
Rules for classification: Tiebreakers
(R) Relegated

=== Group A4 ===
| Pos | Team | Pld | W | D | L | GF | GA | GD | Pts | Qualification | (Portugal) | (Norway) | (Denmark) | (Wales) |
|---|---|---|---|---|---|---|---|---|---|---|---|---|---|---|
| 1 | Portugal | 6 | 5 | 0 | 1 | 13 | 10 | +3 | 15 | Advance to quarter-finals | — | 2–1 | 1–4 | 1–0 |
| 2 | Norway | 6 | 3 | 0 | 3 | 12 | 11 | +1 | 9 (Note: Head-to-head points: Norway 6, Denmark 0.) | Advance to quarter-finals | 1–2 | — | 3–2 | 3–1 |
| 3 | Denmark | 6 | 3 | 0 | 3 | 13 | 11 | +2 | 9 | Qualification for relegation play-offs | 2–4 | 2–3 | — | 2–0 |
| 4 | Wales | 6 | 1 | 0 | 5 | 5 | 11 | −6 | 3 | Qualification for relegation play-offs | 2–3 | 2–1 | 0–1 | — |

Source: UEFA

=== Ranking of third-placed teams ===
| Pos | Grp | Team | Pld | W | D | L | GF | GA | GD | Pts | Qualification |
|---|---|---|---|---|---|---|---|---|---|---|---|
| 1 | A2 | Greece | 6 | 3 | 2 | 1 | 6 | 10 | −4 | 11 | |
| 2 | A1 | Italy | 6 | 3 | 1 | 2 | 12 | 10 | +2 | 10 | |
| 3 | A4 | Denmark | 6 | 3 | 0 | 3 | 13 | 11 | +2 | 9 | Qualification for relegation play-offs |
| 4 | A3 | Croatia | 6 | 2 | 0 | 4 | 7 | 17 | −10 | 6 | Qualification for relegation play-offs |

Source: UEFA

=== Ranking of fourth-placed teams ===
| Pos | Grp | Team | Pld | W | D | L | GF | GA | GD | Pts | Qualification or relegation |
|---|---|---|---|---|---|---|---|---|---|---|---|
| 1 | A4 | Wales | 6 | 1 | 0 | 5 | 5 | 11 | −6 | 3 | Qualification for relegation play-offs |
| 2 | A2 | Serbia | 6 | 0 | 0 | 6 | 4 | 12 | −8 | 0 | Qualification for relegation play-offs |
| 3 | A1 | Turkey (R) | 6 | 0 | 0 | 6 | 4 | 15 | −11 | 0 | Relegated to League B |
| 4 | A3 | Czech Republic (R) | 6 | 0 | 0 | 6 | 3 | 14 | −11 | 0 | Relegated to League B |

Source: UEFA
(R) Relegated

=== Knockout stage ===
==== Bracket ====
Quarter-finals
Netherlands
Portugal
Spain
France
Belgium
Germany
Norway
England

Semi-finals
9–10 June – TBC
Winner quarter-final 3
Winner quarter-final 1
9–10 June – TBC
Winner quarter-final 4
Winner quarter-final 2

Final
13 June – TBC
Winner semi-final A
Winner semi-final B
Third place play-off
13 June – TBC
Loser semi-final A
Loser semi-final B

==== Quarter-finals ====
The draw for the quarter-finals will be held on 20 November 2026, 12:00 CET. In the draw, teams from the same group cannot be drawn against each other. The first legs will be played on 25 or 27 March, and the second legs will be played on 28 or 30 March 2027.

| Team 1 | Agg. | Team 2 | 1st leg | 2nd leg |
|---|---|---|---|---|
| Spain | 1 | France | 25/27 Mar | 28/30 Mar |
| Norway | 2 | England | 25/27 Mar | 28/30 Mar |
| Netherlands | 3 | Portugal | 25/27 Mar | 28/30 Mar |
| Belgium | 4 | Germany | 25/27 Mar | 28/30 Mar |

==== Nations League Finals ====
The host of the Nations League Finals will preferably be selected from the four qualified teams. The semi-finals pairings will be determined by means of an open draw. For scheduling purposes, the host team will be allocated to semi-final 1 as the administrative home team.

Times are CEST (UTC+2), as listed by UEFA.

===== Semi-finals =====
9–10 June 2027
21:00

| Netherlands or Portugal | Semi-final A | Spain or France |

9–10 June 2027
21:00

| Belgium or Germany | Semi-final B | Norway or England |

===== Third place play-off =====
13 June 2027
15:00

| Loser Match 1 | Match 3 | Loser Match 2 |

===== Final =====
13 June 2027
21:00

| Winner Match 1 | Match 4 | Winner Match 2 |

=== Top goalscorers ===
There have been 161 goals scored in 48 matches, for an average of 3.35 goals per match (as of 17 November 2026).

League A top goalscorers
| Rank | Player | Goals |
|---|---|---|
| 1 | (England national football team) Harry Kane | 8 |
| 2 | (Denmark national football team) Rasmus Højlund | 6 |
| 2 | (Norway national football team) Erling Haaland | 6 |
| 4 | (France national football team) Michael Olise | 5 |
| 4 | (Italy national football team) Pio Esposito | 5 |
| 6 | (Germany national football team) Florian Wirtz | 4 |
| 6 | (Netherlands national football team) Tijjani Reijnders | 4 |
| 6 | (Spain national football team) Lamine Yamal | 4 |
| 9 | (Belgium national football team) Kevin De Bruyne | 3 |
| 9 | (England national football team) Anthony Gordon | 3 |
| 9 | (Portugal national football team) João Félix | 3 |
| 9 | (Portugal national football team) Gonçalo Ramos | 3 |
| 9 | (Spain national football team) Mikel Merino | 3 |

== League B ==
=== Group B1 ===
| Pos | Team | Pld | W | D | L | GF | GA | GD | Pts | Promotion or qualification | (Switzerland) | (Slovenia) | (Scotland) | (North Macedonia) |
|---|---|---|---|---|---|---|---|---|---|---|---|---|---|---|
| 1 | Switzerland (P) | 6 | 5 | 1 | 0 | 15 | 1 | +14 | 16 | Promotion to League A | — | 2–1 | 4–0 | 3–0 |
| 2 | Slovenia | 6 | 3 | 2 | 1 | 8 | 3 | +5 | 11 | Qualification for promotion play-offs | 0–0 | — | 0–0 | 2–0 |
| 3 | Scotland | 6 | 2 | 1 | 3 | 5 | 10 | −5 | 7 | | 0–3 | 1–2 | — | 2–1 |
| 4 | North Macedonia | 6 | 0 | 0 | 6 | 1 | 15 | −14 | 0 | Qualification for relegation play-offs | 0–3 | 0–3 | 0–2 | — |

Source: UEFA
(P) Promoted

=== Group B2 ===
| Pos | Team | Pld | W | D | L | GF | GA | GD | Pts | Promotion or qualification | (Northern Ireland) | (Hungary) | (Ukraine) | (Georgia (country)) |
|---|---|---|---|---|---|---|---|---|---|---|---|---|---|---|
| 1 | Northern Ireland (P) | 6 | 3 | 3 | 0 | 6 | 1 | +5 | 12 | Promotion to League A | — | 0–0 | 1–0 | 0–0 |
| 2 | Hungary | 6 | 3 | 2 | 1 | 6 | 3 | +3 | 11 | Qualification for promotion play-offs | 1–1 | — | 0–1 | 1–0 |
| 3 | Ukraine | 6 | 2 | 1 | 3 | 3 | 6 | −3 | 7 | | 0–3 | 1–2 | — | 1–0 |
| 4 | Georgia | 6 | 0 | 2 | 4 | 0 | 5 | −5 | 2 | Qualification for relegation play-offs | 0–1 | 0–2 | 0–0 | — |

Source: UEFA
(P) Promoted

=== Group B3 ===
| Pos | Team | Pld | W | D | L | GF | GA | GD | Pts | Promotion or qualification | (Austria) | (Republic of Ireland) | (Kosovo) | (Israel) |
|---|---|---|---|---|---|---|---|---|---|---|---|---|---|---|
| 1 | Austria (P) | 6 | 3 | 3 | 0 | 11 | 6 | +5 | 12 | Promotion to League A | — | 1–0 | 3–1 | 3–1 |
| 2 | Republic of Ireland | 6 | 2 | 2 | 2 | 9 | 5 | +4 | 8 | Qualification for promotion play-offs | 2–2 | — | 3–0 | 1–1 |
| 3 | Kosovo | 6 | 1 | 3 | 2 | 3 | 7 | −4 | 6 | | 1–1 | 1–0 | — | 0–0 |
| 4 | Israel | 6 | 0 | 4 | 2 | 3 | 8 | −5 | 4 | Qualification for relegation play-offs | 1–1 | 0–3 | 0–0 | — |

Source: UEFA
(P) Promoted

=== Group B4 ===
| Pos | Team | Pld | W | D | L | GF | GA | GD | Pts | Promotion or qualification | (Sweden) | (Bosnia and Herzegovina) | (Poland) | (Romania) |
|---|---|---|---|---|---|---|---|---|---|---|---|---|---|---|
| 1 | Sweden (P) | 6 | 4 | 2 | 0 | 11 | 6 | +5 | 14 | Promotion to League A | — | 3–2 | 3–1 | 2–1 |
| 2 | Bosnia and Herzegovina | 6 | 3 | 2 | 1 | 10 | 7 | +3 | 11 | Qualification for promotion play-offs | 1–1 | — | 1–0 | 2–1 |
| 3 | Poland | 6 | 1 | 2 | 3 | 9 | 7 | +2 | 5 | | 1–1 | 0–0 | — | 6–0 |
| 4 | Romania | 6 | 1 | 0 | 5 | 6 | 16 | −10 | 3 | Qualification for relegation play-offs | 0–1 | 2–4 | 2–1 | — |

Source: UEFA
(P) Promoted

=== Top goalscorers ===
There were 106 goals scored in 48 matches, for an average of 2.21 goals per match.

League B top goalscorers
| Rank | Player | Goals |
|---|---|---|
| 1 | (Republic of Ireland national football team) Troy Parrott | 6 |
| 1 | (Sweden men's national football team) Viktor Gyökeres | 6 |
| 3 | (Switzerland national football team) Zeki Amdouni | 4 |
| 4 | (Austria national football team) Saša Kalajdžić | 3 |
| 4 | (Poland national football team) Robert Lewandowski | 3 |
| 4 | (Scotland national football team) John McGinn | 3 |
| 4 | (Slovenia national football team) Danijel Šturm | 3 |
| 8 | 11 players | 2 |

== League C ==
=== Group C1 ===
| Pos | Team | Pld | W | D | L | GF | GA | GD | Pts | Promotion or qualification | (Albania) | (Belarus) | (Finland) | (San Marino) |
|---|---|---|---|---|---|---|---|---|---|---|---|---|---|---|
| 1 | Albania (P) | 6 | 5 | 0 | 1 | 12 | 3 | +9 | 15 | Promotion to League B | — | 2–0 | 2–0 | 2–1 |
| 2 | Belarus | 6 | 3 | 1 | 2 | 7 | 4 | +3 | 10 (Note: Head-to-head points: Belarus 4, Finland 1.) | Qualification for promotion play-offs | 0–2 | — | 1–0 | 4–0 |
| 3 | Finland | 6 | 3 | 1 | 2 | 16 | 6 | +10 | 10 | | 2–1 | 0–0 | — | 7–2 |
| 4 | San Marino | 6 | 0 | 0 | 6 | 3 | 25 | −22 | 0 | | 0–3 | 0–2 | 0–7 | — |

Source: UEFA
(P) Promoted

=== Group C2 ===
| Pos | Team | Pld | W | D | L | GF | GA | GD | Pts | Promotion or qualification | (Montenegro) | (Cyprus) | (Armenia) | (Latvia) |
|---|---|---|---|---|---|---|---|---|---|---|---|---|---|---|
| 1 | Montenegro (P) | 6 | 5 | 1 | 0 | 13 | 6 | +7 | 16 | Promotion to League B | — | 2–1 | 0–0 | 2–1 |
| 2 | Cyprus | 6 | 2 | 2 | 2 | 7 | 8 | −1 | 8 | Qualification for promotion play-offs | 1–4 | — | 2–0 | 2–1 |
| 3 | Armenia | 6 | 1 | 3 | 2 | 5 | 6 | −1 | 6 | | 2–3 | 1–1 | — | 2–0 |
| 4 | Latvia | 6 | 0 | 2 | 4 | 3 | 8 | −5 | 2 | | 1–2 | 0–0 | 0–0 | — |

Source: UEFA
(P) Promoted

=== Group C3 ===
| Pos | Team | Pld | W | D | L | GF | GA | GD | Pts | Promotion or qualification | (Slovakia) | (Faroe Islands) | (Moldova) | (Kazakhstan) |
|---|---|---|---|---|---|---|---|---|---|---|---|---|---|---|
| 1 | Slovakia (P) | 6 | 3 | 3 | 0 | 13 | 6 | +7 | 12 | Promotion to League B | — | 2–2 | 2–0 | 2–1 |
| 2 | Faroe Islands | 6 | 1 | 5 | 0 | 8 | 7 | +1 | 8 | Qualification for promotion play-offs | 1–1 | — | 1–0 | 1–1 |
| 3 | Moldova | 6 | 2 | 1 | 3 | 5 | 10 | −5 | 7 | | 0–4 | 1–1 | — | 2–1 |
| 4 | Kazakhstan | 6 | 0 | 3 | 3 | 8 | 11 | −3 | 3 | | 2–2 | 2–2 | 1–2 | — |

Source: UEFA
(P) Promoted

=== Group C4 ===
| Pos | Team | Pld | W | D | L | GF | GA | GD | Pts | Promotion or qualification | (Iceland) | (Estonia) | (Bulgaria) | (Luxembourg) |
|---|---|---|---|---|---|---|---|---|---|---|---|---|---|---|
| 1 | Iceland (P) | 6 | 4 | 2 | 0 | 15 | 1 | +14 | 14 | Promotion to League B | — | 1–1 | 3–0 | 3–0 |
| 2 | Estonia | 6 | 3 | 3 | 0 | 5 | 2 | +3 | 12 | Qualification for promotion play-offs | 0–0 | — | 2–1 | 1–0 |
| 3 | Bulgaria | 6 | 1 | 1 | 4 | 4 | 12 | −8 | 4 | | 0–5 | 0–0 | — | 1–2 |
| 4 | Luxembourg | 6 | 1 | 0 | 5 | 2 | 11 | −9 | 3 | | 0–3 | 0–1 | 0–2 | — |

Source: UEFA
(P) Promoted

=== Top goalscorers ===
There were 126 goals scored in 48 matches, for an average of 2.62 goals per match.

League C top goalscorers
| Rank | Player | Goals |
|---|---|---|
| 1 | (Iceland national football team) Andri Guðjohnsen | 6 |
| 2 | (Finland national football team) Joel Pohjanpalo | 5 |
| 2 | (Finland national football team) Leo Walta | 5 |
| 2 | (Montenegro national football team) Nikola Krstović | 5 |
| 5 | (Albania national football team) Rei Manaj | 4 |
| 5 | (Finland national football team) Adrian Svanbäck | 4 |
| 5 | (Iceland national football team) Orri Óskarsson | 4 |
| 8 | (Albania national football team) Kristjan Asllani | 3 |
| 8 | (Belarus national football team) Artem Kontsevoy | 3 |
| 8 | (Faroe Islands national football team) Áki Samuelsen | 3 |
| 8 | (Moldova national football team) Petru Popescu | 3 |

== League D ==
=== Group D1 ===
| Pos | Team | Pld | W | D | L | GF | GA | GD | Pts | Promotion | (Malta) | (Andorra) | (Gibraltar) |
|---|---|---|---|---|---|---|---|---|---|---|---|---|---|
| 1 | Malta (P) | 4 | 2 | 2 | 0 | 5 | 3 | +2 | 8 | Promotion to League C | — | 1–0 | 1–1 |
| 2 | Andorra (P) | 4 | 1 | 1 | 2 | 3 | 3 | 0 | 4 | Promotion to League C | 1–2 | — | 2–0 |
| 3 | Gibraltar (P) | 4 | 0 | 3 | 1 | 2 | 4 | −2 | 3 | Promotion to League C | 1–1 | 0–0 | — |

Source: UEFA
(P) Promoted

=== Group D2 ===
| Pos | Team | Pld | W | D | L | GF | GA | GD | Pts | Promotion | (Azerbaijan) | (Lithuania) | (Liechtenstein) |
|---|---|---|---|---|---|---|---|---|---|---|---|---|---|
| 1 | Azerbaijan (P) | 4 | 2 | 2 | 0 | 3 | 1 | +2 | 8 | Promotion to League C | — | 1–0 | 0–0 |
| 2 | Lithuania (P) | 4 | 2 | 1 | 1 | 5 | 3 | +2 | 7 | Promotion to League C | 1–1 | — | 2–1 |
| 3 | Liechtenstein (P) | 4 | 0 | 1 | 3 | 1 | 5 | −4 | 1 | Promotion to League C | 0–1 | 0–2 | — |

Source: UEFA
(P) Promoted

=== Top goalscorers ===
There were 19 goals scored in 12 matches, for an average of 1.58 goals per match.

League D top goalscorers
| Rank | Player | Goals |
|---|---|---|
| 1 | (Andorra national football team) Guillaume López | 2 |
| 1 | (Azerbaijan national football team) Mahir Emreli | 2 |
| 1 | (Malta national football team) Teddy Teuma | 2 |
| 4 | (Andorra national football team) Albert Rosas | 1 |
| 4 | (Azerbaijan national football team) Abdulakh Khaybulayev | 1 |
| 4 | (Gibraltar national football team) Carlos Richards | 1 |
| 4 | (Gibraltar national football team) James Scanlon | 1 |
| 4 | (Liechtenstein national football team) Aron Sele | 1 |
| 4 | (Lithuania national football team) Artūr Dolžnikov | 1 |
| 4 | (Lithuania national football team) Eligijus Jankauskas | 1 |
| 4 | (Lithuania national football team) Armandas Kučys | 1 |
| 4 | (Lithuania national football team) Lukas Michelbrink | 1 |
| 4 | (Lithuania national football team) Manfredas Ruzgis | 1 |
| 4 | (Malta national football team) Irvin Cardona | 1 |
| 4 | (Malta national football team) Joseph Mbong | 1 |
| 4 | (Malta national football team) Kurt Shaw | 1 |

== Promotion/relegation play-offs ==
The draw for the promotion/relegation play-offs will be held on 20 November 2026 at the UEFA headquarters in Nyon, Switzerland, along with the draw for the League A quarter-finals. The first legs will be played on 25 and 27 March, and the second legs will be played on 28 and 30 March 2027.

=== League A vs League B ===
| Team 1 | Agg. | Team 2 | 1st leg | 2nd leg |
|---|---|---|---|---|
| Bosnia and Herzegovina | | Denmark | 25/27 Mar | 28/30 Mar |
| Hungary | | Serbia | 25/27 Mar | 28/30 Mar |
| Republic of Ireland | | Croatia | 25/27 Mar | 28/30 Mar |
| Slovenia | | Wales | 25/27 Mar | 28/30 Mar |

=== League B vs League C ===
| Team 1 | Agg. | Team 2 | 1st leg | 2nd leg |
|---|---|---|---|---|
| Cyprus | | North Macedonia | 25/27 Mar | 28/30 Mar |
| Estonia | | Romania | 25/27 Mar | 28/30 Mar |
| Faroe Islands | | Georgia | 25/27 Mar | 28/30 Mar |
| Belarus | | Israel | 25/27 Mar | 28/30 Mar |

== Overall ranking ==
=== Interim overall ranking ===
Following the conclusion of the league phase in November 2026, an interim overall ranking was established based on the results of each league, explicitly ordering teams from higher leagues over those from lower ones.

League A
League B

| Rnk | Team | Pld | Pts |
|---|---|---|---|
| 1 | England | 6 | 15 |
| 2 | Portugal | 6 | 15 |
| 3 | France | 6 | 13 |
| 4 | Germany | 6 | 11 |
| 5 | Spain | 6 | 15 |
| 6 | Belgium | 6 | 12 |
| 7 | Netherlands | 6 | 11 |
| 8 | Norway | 6 | 9 |
| 9 | Greece | 6 | 11 |
| 10 | Italy | 6 | 10 |
| 11 | Denmark | 6 | 9 |
| 12 | Croatia | 6 | 6 |
| 13 | Wales | 6 | 3 |
| 14 | Serbia | 6 | 0 |
| 15 | Turkey | 6 | 0 |
| 16 | Czech Republic | 6 | 0 |

Source: UEFA

| Rnk | Team | Pld | Pts |
|---|---|---|---|
| 17 | Switzerland | 6 | 16 |
| 18 | Sweden | 6 | 14 |
| 19 | Austria | 6 | 12 |
| 20 | Northern Ireland | 6 | 12 |
| 21 | Slovenia | 6 | 11 |
| 22 | Bosnia and Herzegovina | 6 | 11 |
| 23 | Hungary | 6 | 11 |
| 24 | Republic of Ireland | 6 | 8 |
| 25 | Ukraine | 6 | 7 |
| 26 | Scotland | 6 | 7 |
| 27 | Kosovo | 6 | 6 |
| 28 | Poland | 6 | 5 |
| 29 | Israel | 6 | 4 |
| 30 | Romania | 6 | 3 |
| 31 | Georgia | 6 | 2 |
| 32 | North Macedonia | 6 | 0 |

Source: UEFA
League C
League D

| Rnk | Team | Pld | Pts |
|---|---|---|---|
| 33 | Montenegro | 6 | 16 |
| 34 | Albania | 6 | 15 |
| 35 | Iceland | 6 | 14 |
| 36 | Slovakia | 6 | 12 |
| 37 | Estonia | 6 | 12 |
| 38 | Belarus | 6 | 10 |
| 39 | Faroe Islands | 6 | 8 |
| 40 | Cyprus | 6 | 8 |
| 41 | Finland | 6 | 10 |
| 42 | Moldova | 6 | 7 |
| 43 | Armenia | 6 | 6 |
| 44 | Bulgaria | 6 | 4 |
| 45 | Kazakhstan | 6 | 3 |
| 46 | Luxembourg | 6 | 3 |
| 47 | Latvia | 6 | 2 |
| 48 | San Marino | 6 | 0 |

Source: UEFA

| Rnk | Team | Pld | Pts |
|---|---|---|---|
| 49 | Malta | 4 | 8 |
| 50 | Azerbaijan | 4 | 8 |
| 51 | Lithuania | 4 | 7 |
| 52 | Andorra | 4 | 4 |
| 53 | Gibraltar | 4 | 3 |
| 54 | Liechtenstein | 4 | 1 |

Source: UEFA

=== Final overall ranking ===
The final overall ranking, to be established at the conclusion of the competition, will adjust the interim overall ranking by taking into account the results of the League A knockout stage and promotion/relegation play-offs. Teams that are promoted at the end of the 2026–27 season will be ranked above those who are relegated, with the final rankings reflecting the composition of leagues for the 2028–29 UEFA Nations League.

Key
| ▲ | Promoted after the season |
| ▼ | Relegated after the season |
| * | Participated in promotion/relegation play-offs |

League A

| Rnk | Team | P |
|---|---|---|
| 1 | Nations League Finals winner | |
| 2 | Nations League Finals runner-up | |
| 3 | Nations League Finals 3rd place | |
| 4 | Nations League Finals 4th place | |
| 5 | 1st-ranked quarter-final loser | |
| 6 | 2nd-ranked quarter-final loser | |
| 7 | 3rd-ranked quarter-final loser | |
| 8 | 4th-ranked quarter-final loser | |
| 9 | Greece | |
| 10 | Italy | |
| 11 | 1st-ranked League A/B play-off winner or League B group winner | |
| 12 | 2nd-ranked League A/B play-off winner or League B group winner | |
| 13 | 3rd-ranked League A/B play-off winner or League B group winner | |
| 14 | 4th-ranked League A/B play-off winner or League B group winner | |
| 15 | 5th-ranked League A/B play-off winner or League B group winner | |
| 16 | 6th-ranked League A/B play-off winner or League B group winner | |
| 17 | 7th-ranked League A/B play-off winner or League B group winner | |
| 18 | 8th-ranked League A/B play-off winner or League B group winner | |

Source: UEFA
Rules for classification: Ranking criteria
League B

| Rnk | Team | P/R |
|---|---|---|
| 19 | 1st-ranked League A/B play-off loser or League A 4th place | |
| 20 | 2nd-ranked League A/B play-off loser or League A 4th place | |
| 21 | 3rd-ranked League A/B play-off loser or League A 4th place | |
| 22 | 4th-ranked League A/B play-off loser or League A 4th place | |
| 23 | 5th-ranked League A/B play-off loser or League A 4th place | |
| 24 | 6th-ranked League A/B play-off loser or League A 4th place | |
| 25 | Ukraine | |
| 26 | Scotland | |
| 27 | Kosovo | |
| 28 | Poland | |
| 29 | 1st-ranked League B/C play-off winner or League C group winner | |
| 30 | 2nd-ranked League B/C play-off winner or League C group winner | |
| 31 | 3rd-ranked League B/C play-off winner or League C group winner | |
| 32 | 4th-ranked League B/C play-off winner or League C group winner | |
| 33 | 5th-ranked League B/C play-off winner or League C group winner | |
| 34 | 6th-ranked League B/C play-off winner or League C group winner | |
| 35 | 7th-ranked League B/C play-off winner or League C group winner | |
| 36 | 8th-ranked League B/C play-off winner or League C group winner | |

Source: UEFA
Rules for classification: Ranking criteria
League C

| Rnk | Team | P/R |
|---|---|---|
| 37 | 1st-ranked League B/C play-off loser | |
| 38 | 2nd-ranked League B/C play-off loser | |
| 39 | 3rd-ranked League B/C play-off loser | |
| 40 | 4th-ranked League B/C play-off loser | |
| 41 | Finland | |
| 42 | Moldova | |
| 43 | Armenia | |
| 44 | Bulgaria | |
| 45 | Kazakhstan | |
| 46 | Luxembourg | |
| 47 | Latvia | |
| 48 | San Marino | |
| 49 | Malta | ▲ |
| 50 | Azerbaijan | ▲ |
| 51 | Lithuania | ▲ |
| 52 | Andorra | ▲ |
| 53 | Gibraltar | ▲ |
| 54 | Liechtenstein | ▲ |

Source: UEFA
Rules for classification: Ranking criteria
