= 2024 Baltic Cup =

International football competition

Tournament details
- Host country: Estonia; Latvia; Lithuania
- Dates: 8–11 June 2024
- Teams: 4
- Venue: 3 (in 3 host cities)

Final positions
- Champions: Estonia (5th title)
- Runners-up: Lithuania
- Third place: Latvia
- Fourth place: Faroe Islands

Tournament statistics
- Matches played: 4
- Goals scored: 10 (2.5 per match)

The 2024 Baltic Cup was the 30th Baltic Cup, an international football tournament contested by the Baltic states. The competition was won by Estonia, who claimed their fifth title. Faroe Islands made their debut as invited guests.

== Format ==
This edition saw the previous knock-out tournament format first tried at 2012 Baltic Cup used. Penalty shoot-outs were used to decide the winner if a match was drawn after 90 minutes.

== Results ==
Semi-finals
8 June – Liepāja
Latvia	0
Lithuania	2
8 June – Tallinn
Estonia	4
Faroe Islands	1

Final
11 June – Kaunas
Lithuania	1 (3)
Estonia (p)	1 (4)
Third place
11 June – Liepāja
Latvia	1
Faroe Islands	0

== Matches ==
=== Latvia vs. Lithuania ===
8 June 2024
16:00
Semi Final

Latvia	0–2	Lithuania
	Report	Kučys 49'; Dolžnikov 72'

Daugava Stadium, Liepāja
Attendance: 3,505
Referee: Juri Frischer (Estonia)

=== Estonia vs. Faroe Islands ===
8 June 2024
19:00
Semi Final

Estonia	4–1	Faroe Islands
Tamm 43'; Anier 50'; Tur 83'; Kuraksin 89'	Report	Knudsen 24'

A. Le Coq Arena, Tallinn
Attendance: 3,919
Referee: Robertas Valikonis (Lithuania)

=== Latvia vs. Faroe Islands ===
11 June 2024
19:00
Third Place Match

Latvia	1–0	Faroe Islands
Cigaņiks 49'	Report

Daugava Stadium, Liepāja
Attendance: 1,414
Referee: Kristo Tohver (Estonia)

=== Lithuania vs. Estonia ===
11 June 2024
19:00
Final

Lithuania	1–1	Estonia
Matulevicius 84'	Report	Lepik 82'
Penalties
Lasickas (penalty missed); Černych (penalty missed); Tutyškinas (penalty scored); Novikovas (penalty scored); Klimavičius (penalty scored)	3–4	(penalty scored) Mets; (penalty scored) Lepik; (penalty scored) Palumets; (penalty missed) Sorga; (penalty scored) Vetkal

Darius and Girėnas Stadium, Kaunas
Attendance: 5,900
Referee: Andris Treimanis (Latvia)
