= Pijus Širvys =

Lithuanian footballer (born 1998)

Personal information
- Date of birth: 1 April 1998 (age 28)
- Place of birth: Kaunas, Lithuania
- Height: 1.83 m (6 ft 0 in)
- Position: Right-back

Team information
- Current team: Celje
- Number: 2

Youth career
- FM Tauras-Kauno Žalgiris

Senior career*
Years	Team	Apps	(Gls)
2016	Hegelmann	15	(1)
2017	Šilutė	11	(3)
2018–2020	Kauno Žalgiris	66	(8)
2021–2023	Panevėžys	93	(12)
2024–2026	Maribor	69	(3)
2026–	Celje	7	(0)

International career^{‡}
2016	Lithuania U19	8	(0)
2018–2020	Lithuania U21	8	(0)
2022–	Lithuania	33	(4)
- * Club domestic league appearances and goals as of 18 October 2026 ‡ National team caps and goals as of 16 November 2026

Pijus Širvys (born 1 April 1998) is a Lithuanian footballer who plays as a right-back for Slovenian PrvaLiga club Celje and the Lithuania national team.

== Career ==
Širvys joined A Lyga club FK Panevėžys for the 2021 season. In January 2023, he signed an extension to remain with the club for the upcoming season.

== Career statistics ==
=== International ===
As of match played 16 November 2026

Appearances and goals by national team and year
National team	Year	Apps	Goals
Lithuania	2022	4	0
Lithuania	2023	8	3
Lithuania	2024	10	0
Lithuania	2025	6	1
Lithuania	2026	5	0
Total		33	4

Scores and results list Lithuania's goal tally first, score column indicates score after each Širvys goal.

List of international goals scored by Pijus Širvys
No.	Date	Venue	Opponent	Score	Result	Competition
1	14 October 2023	Vasil Levski National Stadium, Sofia, Bulgaria	Bulgaria	1–0	2–0	UEFA Euro 2024 qualifying
2	14 October 2023	Vasil Levski National Stadium, Sofia, Bulgaria	Bulgaria	2–0	2–0	UEFA Euro 2024 qualifying
3	17 October 2023	Darius and Girėnas Stadium, Kaunas, Lithuania	Hungary	2–0	2–2	UEFA Euro 2024 qualifying
4	9 October 2025	Helsinki Olympic Stadium, Helsinki, Finland	Finland	1–0	1–2	2026 FIFA World Cup qualification
