= Giedrius Matulevičius =

Lithuanian footballer

Personal information
- Full name: Giedrius Matulevičius
- Date of birth: 5 March 1997 (age 29)
- Place of birth: Marijampolė, Lithuania
- Height: 1.83 m (6 ft 0 in)
- Position: Midfielder

Team information
- Current team: FK Žalgiris
- Number: 17

Youth career
- –2013: Sūduva

Senior career*
Years	Team	Apps	(Gls)
2013	Sūduva	2	(0)
2013–2015	Parma	0	(0)
2014–2015	→ Arezzo (loan)	0	(0)
2015–2016	Švyturys Marijampolė		
2015–2016	→ Sampdoria (loan)	0	(0)
2017–2022	Sūduva	153	(11)
2023	Hegelmann	34	(2)
2024–	Žalgiris	67	(13)

International career^{‡}
2013	Lithuania U17	3	(0)
2015	Lithuania U19	3	(0)
2017–2018	Lithuania U21	8	(1)
2018–	Lithuania	13	(1)
- * Club domestic league appearances and goals as of 12 March 2026 ‡ National team caps and goals as of 14:31, 5 October 2026 (UTC)

Giedrius Matulevičius (born 5 March 1997) is a Lithuanian footballer who plays as a midfielder for Žalgiris and the Lithuania national team.

== International career ==
Matulevičius made his international debut for Lithuania on 20 November 2018, coming on as a substitute in the 69th minute for Modestas Vorobjovas in the 2018–19 UEFA Nations League C match against Serbia, which finished as a 1–4 away loss.

== Career statistics ==
=== International ===
As of 26 March 2026

Appearances and goals by national team and year
National team	Year	Apps	Goals
Lithuania	2018	1	0
Lithuania	2019	2	0
Lithuania	2024	7	1
Lithuania	2025	2	0
Lithuania	2026	1	0
Total		13	1
