= Lithuania national football team =

Men's association football team

Lithuania
- Nickname(s): Rinktinė (National team); Trispalvės (Tricolours)
- Association: Lietuvos Futbolo Federacija (LFF)
- Confederation: UEFA (Europe)
- Head coach: Mindaugas Čepas
- Captain: Fedor Černych
- Most caps: Fedor Černych (103)
- Top scorer: Tomas Danilevičius (19)
- Home stadium: Darius and Girėnas Stadium
- FIFA code: LTU
First colours	Second colours

FIFA ranking
- Current: 146 ▲2 (18 November 2026)
- Highest: 37 (October 2008)
- Lowest: 149 (December 2017, June 2026)

First international
- Lithuania 0–5 Estonia (Kaunas, Lithuania; 24 June 1923)

Biggest win
- Lithuania 7–0 Estonia (Riga, Latvia; 20 May 1995)

Biggest defeat
- Egypt 10–0 Lithuania (Paris, France; 27 May 1924)

Baltic Cup
- Appearances: 30 (first in 1928)
- Best result: Champions (1930, 1935, 1991, 1992, 1994, 1996, 1997, 1998, 2005, 2010)

The Lithuania national football team (Lithuanian: Lietuvos nacionalinė futbolo rinktinė) represents Lithuania in men's international football, and is controlled by the Lithuanian Football Federation, the governing body for football in Lithuania. They played their first match in 1923. In 1940, Lithuania was occupied by the Soviet Union; the country regained its independence in 1990 and played their first match thereafter against Georgia on 27 May of that year.

Although Lithuania has never qualified for the FIFA World Cup, nor the UEFA European Championship, they have successfully participated in the regional Baltic Cup tournament, which takes place every two years between Lithuania and their Baltic rivals, Latvia and Estonia. Lithuania has won the Baltic Cup championship 10 times out of 29 appearances, and only Latvia has won it more frequently. Despite this, Lithuania holds the record for winning the most consecutive Baltic Cup championships, four titles in a row from 1996 to 2000.

From 2012 until 2022, the team played their home matches at the LFF Stadium in Vilnius. Since 2022, they have played their home matches at the Darius and Girėnas Stadium in Kaunas.

== History ==
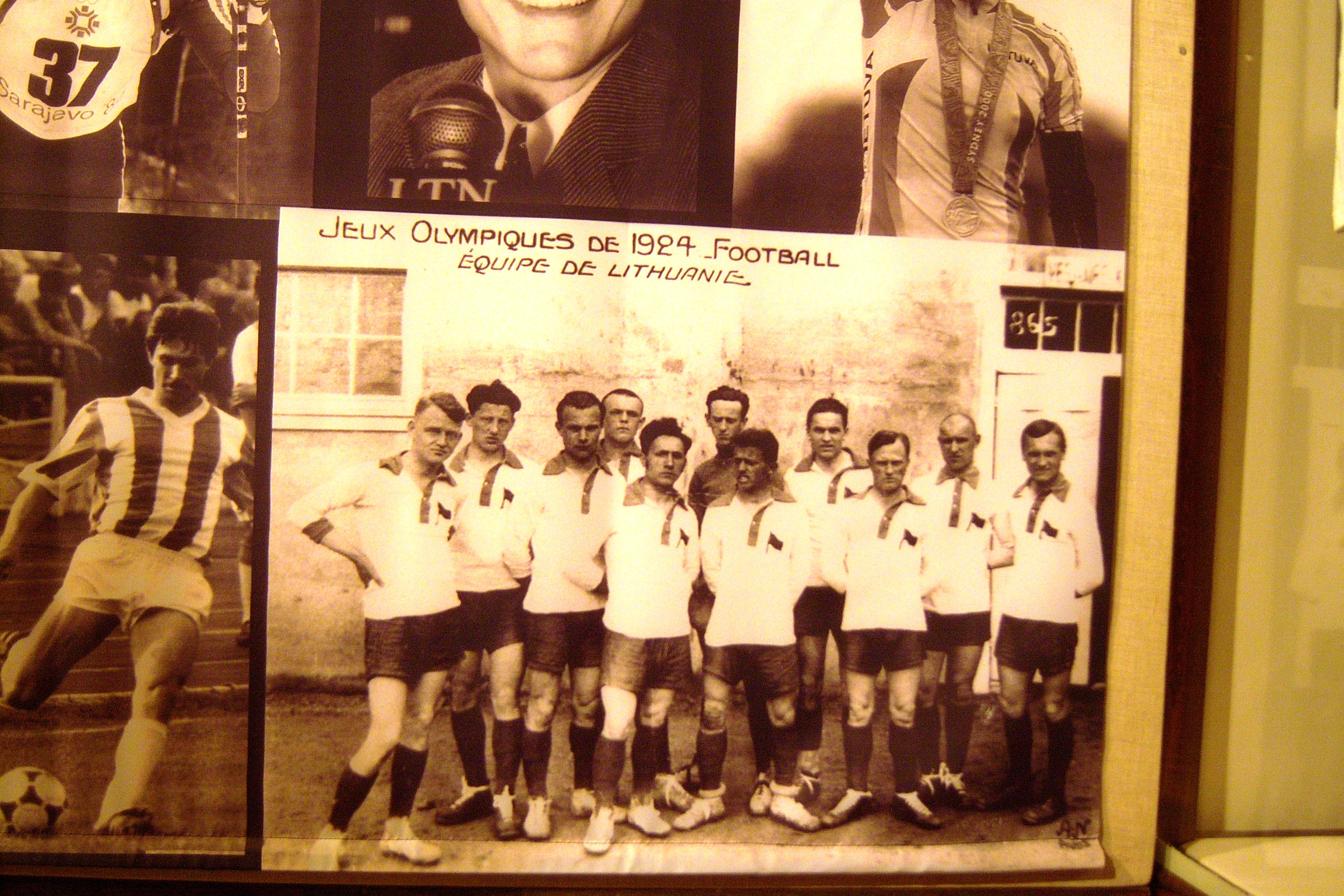
Lithuanian football team at the 1924 Summer Olympics

On 24 June 1923, Lithuania played their first ever game, at the Lietuvos Fizinio Lavinimosi Sąjunga Stadionas, resulting in a 5–0 loss against Estonia. In 1924, Lithuania entered the 1924 Olympics in France, losing 9–0 against Switzerland on 25 May 1924. Two days later, Lithuania suffered a 10–0 loss to Egypt, a record defeat to date. During the early years of the Lithuanian national team, Lithuania regularly played Baltic neighbours Estonia and Latvia, with Lithuania's first win coming in a 2–1 away win against Estonia on 24 August 1924 in Tallinn. In 1930, Lithuania won the third edition of the Baltic Cup in Kaunas. On 13 October 1940, Lithuania played their final game for just shy of 50 years, a 4–3 win against Latvia, following the first Soviet annexation of the country.

Lithuania's first game following the declaration of independence in 1990 was a 2–2 draw against Georgia in Tbilisi on 27 May 1990. In the 1990s, Lithuania established a respectable presence in the World Cup and European Championship qualifiers: third place in their group in both Euro 1996 and the 1998 World Cup qualifiers. In the Euro 2004 qualifiers, they were once again contenders for qualification and managed an away draw with Germany and a home win over Scotland; however, a 1–0 defeat to Scotland in the final game ended their hopes. Although finishing fifth in their 2006 World Cup qualifying group, Lithuania were nevertheless competitive.

Lithuania drew with world champions Italy 1–1 in Naples in a Euro 2008 qualifying game on 2 September 2006, in the first competitive game that Italy played since the World Cup final.

On 6 September 2008, Lithuania defeated Romania 3–0 in a 2010 World Cup qualifier. The victory was regarded by many as "a historic win." It was followed by another successful 2–0 performance against Austria in Marijampolė on 10 September 2008. Lithuania finished their qualification in fifth, with 3 wins, 3 draws and 4 losses.

On 20 June 2010, Lithuania won their 10th Baltic Cup after beating Estonia 2-0.

In Lithuania's 2022-23 UEFA Nations League C campaign, they finished last in Group 1 after achieved just one draw against the Faroe Islands. As one of the two lowest ranked fourth placed teams, Lithuania had to play Gibraltar in a relegation playoff. Lithuania won both legs 1-0 to beat Gibraltar 2-0 on aggregate.

After remaining in League C for the 2024-25 UEFA Nations League, Lithuania lost all six matches and thus, finished last in Group 2. As the lowest ranked fourth placed team, Lithuania were automatically relegated to League D for 2026-27 due to a regulation change after the previous edition.

== Results and fixtures ==
The following is a list of match results in the last 12 months, as well as any future matches that have been scheduled.

Win Draw Loss Fixture

=== 2026 ===
26 March 2026 Friendly	Moldova	0–2	Lithuania	Chișinău, Moldova
17:00 UTC+2		Report	Lasickas 33'; Gineitis 71'	Stadium: Zimbru Stadium; Attendance: 4,328; Referee: Henrik Nalbandyan (Armenia)

29 March 2026 Friendly	Lithuania	0–2	Georgia	Kaunas, Lithuania
16:00 UTC+3	Gineitis (yellow card) 79' (yellow-red card) 90+3'	Report	Mikautadze 70' (pen.), 84'	Stadium: Darius and Girėnas Stadium; Attendance: 7,726; Referee: Vitālijs Spasjoņņikovs (Latvia)

6 June 2026 2026 Baltic Cup semi-final	Lithuania	1–1 (5–4 p)	Latvia	Kaunas, Lithuania
16:00 UTC+3	Kučys 28'	Report	Toņiševs 60'	Stadium: Darius and Girėnas Stadium; Attendance: 7,789; Referee: Joonas Jaanotivs (Estonia)
	Penalties
	Utkus (penalty scored); Gineitis (penalty scored); Kučys (penalty scored); Michelbrink (penalty missed); Novikovas (penalty scored); Burba (penalty scored)		(penalty scored) Regža; (penalty scored) Ķigurs; (penalty missed) Meļņiks; (penalty scored) Cigaņiks; (penalty scored) Saveļjevs; (penalty missed) Penkevics

9 June 2026 2026 Baltic Cup Final	Estonia	1–0	Lithuania	Tallinn, Estonia
19:00 UTC+3	Mustmaa 80'	Report		Stadium: A. Le Coq Arena; Attendance: 3,613; Referee: Vitālijs Spasjoņņikovs (Latvia)

24 September 2026 2026–27 UEFA Nations League	Liechtenstein	0–2	Lithuania	Vaduz, Liechtenstein
20:45 UTC+2		Report	Michelbrink 53'; Dolžnikov 66'	Stadium: Rheinpark Stadion; Attendance: 1,055; Referee: Ante Čulina (Croatia)

27 September 2026 2026–27 UEFA Nations League	Lithuania	1–1	Azerbaijan	Kaunas, Lithuania
16:00 UTC+3	Kučys 9' (pen.)	Report	Emreli 14'	Stadium: Darius and Girėnas Stadium; Attendance: 7,539; Referee: Menelaos Antoniou (Cyprus)

30 September 2026 Friendly	Lithuania	3–0	Andorra	Kaunas, Lithuania
19:00 UTC+3	Ruzgis 21' (pen.); Steponavičius 27'; Kučys 46'	Report		Stadium: Darius and Girėnas Stadium; Attendance: 1,990; Referee: Andris Treimanis (Latvia)

4 October 2026 2026–27 UEFA Nations League	Azerbaijan	1–0	Lithuania	Baku, Azerbaijan
17:00 UTC+4	Khaybulayev 25'	Report		Stadium: Neftçi Arena; Attendance: 5,000; Referee: Gustavo Correia (Portugal)

12 November 2026 Friendly	Lithuania	0–0	Suriname	Kaunas, Lithuania
19:00 UTC+2		Report		Stadium: Darius and Girėnas Stadium; Referee: Andris Treimanis (Latvia)

16 November 2026 2026–27 UEFA Nations League	Lithuania	2−1	Liechtenstein	Kaunas, Lithuania
19:00 UTC+2	Jankauskas 16'; Ruzgis 50' (pen.)	Report	Sele 60'	Stadium: Darius and Girėnas Stadium; Attendance: 2,276; Referee: Allard Lindhout (Netherlands)

== Coaching staff ==
=== Managers history ===
Name	Nat	From	To	Games	Won	Drawn	Lost	GF	GA	Win%
Benjaminas Zelkevičius	(Lithuania)	1990	1991	3	1	2	0	7	4	33.33
Algimantas Liubinskas	(Lithuania)	1992	1994	29	7	8	14	29	48	24.14
Benjaminas Zelkevičius	(Lithuania)	1995	1997	29	12	6	11	45	41	41.38
Kęstutis Latoža	(Lithuania)	1998	1999	18	5	4	9	15	24	27.78
Robertas Tautkus (caretaker)	(Lithuania)	1999	1999	1	0	0	1	0	3	0.00
Stasys Stankus	(Lithuania)	2000	2000	8	2	0	6	8	18	25.00
Julius Kvedaras (caretaker)	(Lithuania)	2000	2000	1	0	0	1	1	6	0.00
Benjaminas Zelkevičius	(Lithuania)	2001	2003	19	4	3	12	20	41	21.05
Algimantas Liubinskas	(Lithuania)	2003	2008	50	18	6	26	54	65	36.00
José Couceiro	(Portugal)	2008	2009	15	6	3	6	17	15	40.00
Raimondas Žutautas	(Lithuania)	2010	2011	16	4	3	9	11	22	25.00
Csaba László	(Hungary)	2012	2013	16	2	4	10	12	28	12.50
Igoris Pankratjevas	(Lithuania)	2013	2015	21	5	5	11	14	31	23.81
Edgaras Jankauskas	(Lithuania)	2016	2018	26	3	5	18	14	50	11.54
Valdas Urbonas	(Lithuania)	2019	2021	24	5	4	15	17	49	20.83
Valdas Ivanauskas	(Lithuania)	2021	2022	13	2	1	10	6	29	15.38
Reinhold Breu (interim)	(Germany)	2022	2022	4	0	2	2	1	4	0.00
Edgaras Jankauskas	(Lithuania)	2023	2026	38	8	9	21	38	59	21.05
Mindaugas Čepas	(Lithuania)	2026	Present	0	0	0	0	0	0	—

== Players ==
=== Current squad ===
- The following players were called up for the friendly game as well as the UEFA Nations League game in November 2026.
- Caps and goals correct as of 4 October 2026, after the match against Azerbaijan.

No.	Pos.	Player	Date of birth (age)	Caps	Goals	Club
1	GK	Arnas Voitinovičius	30 August 2006 (age 20)	0	0	(Portuguese Football Federation) S.L. Benfica
12	GK	Tomas Švedkauskas	22 June 1994 (age 32)	21	0	(Lithuanian Football Federation) FK Kauno Žalgiris
23	GK	Vincentas Šarkauskas	11 August 1999 (age 27)	0	0	(Lithuanian Football Federation) FK Žalgiris
2	DF	Artemijus Tutyškinas	8 August 2003 (age 23)	26	0	(Football Association of Slovenia) NK Celje
4	DF	Žygimantas Baltrūnas	11 March 2002 (age 24)	4	0	(Lithuanian Football Federation) FK Sūduva
5	DF	Kipras Kažukolovas	20 November 2000 (age 25)	20	0	(Kazakhstan Football Federation) FC Astana
13	DF	Justas Lasickas	6 October 1997 (age 29)	75	3	(Croatian Football Federation) HNK Rijeka
17	DF	Pijus Širvys	1 April 1998 (age 28)	31	4	(Football Association of Slovenia) NK Celje
18	DF	Vilius Armalas	21 July 2000 (age 26)	14	0	(Hungarian Football Federation) MTK Budapest FC
20	DF	Rokas Lekiatas	7 November 1998 (age 28)	17	0	(Lithuanian Football Federation) FK Kauno Žalgiris
21	DF	Deividas Šešplaukis	2 February 1998 (age 28)	6	0	(Lithuanian Football Federation) FK Žalgiris
7	MF	Artūr Dolžnikov	6 June 2000 (age 26)	26	2	(Football Association of the Czech Republic) FC Slovácko
8	MF	Domantas Šluta	1 October 2004 (age 22)	4	0	(Lithuanian Football Federation) FK Transinvest
11	MF	Eligijus Jankauskas	22 June 1998 (age 28)	18	0	(Israel Football Association) Hapoel Rishon LeZion F.C.
14	MF	Vykintas Slivka	29 April 1995 (age 31)	77	3	(Lithuanian Football Federation) FK Kauno Žalgiris
15	MF	Gvidas Gineitis	15 April 2004 (age 22)	35	5	(Italian Football Federation) Torino FC
16	MF	Lukas Michelbrink	15 April 2005 (age 21)	8	1	(German Football Association) FC Energie Cottbus
22	MF	Motiejus Burba	10 August 2003 (age 23)	10	0	(Lithuanian Football Federation) FK Kauno Žalgiris
	MF	Paulius Golubickas	19 August 1999 (age 27)	39	2	(Lithuanian Football Federation) FK Žalgiris
	MF	Gratas Sirgėdas	17 December 1994 (age 31)	30	3	(Lithuanian Football Federation) FK Kauno Žalgiris
	MF	Matas Vareika	27 June 2000 (age 26)	3	0	(Lithuanian Football Federation) FK Žalgiris
9	FW	Manfredas Ruzgis	5 January 1997 (age 29)	5	1	(Albanian Football Federation) KS Besa
10	FW	Armandas Kučys	27 February 2003 (age 23)	23	8	(Football Association of Slovenia) NK Celje
	FW	Edgaras Dubickas	9 July 1998 (age 28)	7	0	(Korea Football Association) Suwon Samsung Bluewings

=== Recent call-ups ===
The following players have been called up for the team in the last twelve months.

Pos.	Player	Date of birth (age)	Caps	Goals	Club	Latest call-up
GK	Edvinas Gertmonas	13 May 1997 (age 29)	25	0	(Switzerland) Servette	Estonia, 9 June 2026
GK	Džiugas Bartkus	7 November 1989 (age 37)	15	0	(Bahrain) Al-Riffa	Estonia, 9 June 2026
GK	Ignas Plūkas ^{INJ}	8 December 1993 (age 32)	1	0	(Lithuania) Sūduva	Estonia, 9 June 2026
GK	Marius Adamonis	13 May 1997 (age 29)	1	0	(Lithuania) Žalgiris	Georgia, 29 March 2026
DF	Edgaras Utkus	22 June 2000 (age 26)	30	0	(Saudi Arabia) Al-Kholood	Estonia, 9 June 2026
DF	Klaudijus Upstas	30 October 1994 (age 32)	14	0	(Lithuania) Žalgiris	Estonia, 9 June 2026
DF	Matijus Remeikis	28 March 2003 (age 23)	6	0	(Lithuania) Hegelmann	Estonia, 9 June 2026
DF	Adrian Lickūnas	28 March 2006 (age 20)	4	0	(Italy) Cremonese	Estonia, 9 June 2026
DF	Edvinas Kloniūnas	28 June 1998 (age 28)	2	0	(Lithuania) Transinvest	Estonia, 9 June 2026
DF	Deividas Malžinskas	1 May 1999 (age 27)	1	0	(Lithuania) Transinvest	Estonia, 9 June 2026
DF	Ričardas Šveikauskas	9 April 1997 (age 29)	0	0	(Lithuania) Transinvest	Estonia, 9 June 2026
DF	Edvinas Girdvainis	19 January 1993 (age 33)	63	2	(Lithuania) Transinvest	Georgia, 29 March 2026
DF	Sigitas Olberkis	19 April 1997 (age 29)	0	0	(Iraq) Erbil	Georgia, 29 March 2026
DF	Dominykas Barauskas ^{INJ}	18 April 1997 (age 29)	11	0	(Lithuania) Transinvest	Finland, 24 March 2026
MF	Arvydas Novikovas	18 December 1990 (age 35)	97	12	(Lithuania) Šiauliai	Estonia, 9 June 2026
MF	Modestas Vorobjovas	30 December 1995 (age 30)	56	1	(Israel) Bnei Sakhnin	Estonia, 9 June 2026
MF	Tomas Kalinauskas	27 April 2000 (age 26)	12	0	(Israel) Maccabi Bnei Reineh	Estonia, 9 June 2026
MF	Faustas Steponavičius	8 June 2004 (age 22)	3	1	(Lithuania) Sūduva	Estonia, 9 June 2026
MF	Vaidas Magdušauskas ^{INJ}	2 December 2003 (age 22)	2	0	(Lithuania) Banga	Estonia, 9 June 2026
MF	Giedrius Matulevičius	5 March 1997 (age 29)	13	1	(Lithuania) Žalgiris	Georgia, 29 March 2026
FW	Ignas Venckus	17 July 2001 (age 25)	4	0	(Lithuania) Banga	Estonia, 9 June 2026
FW	Meinardas Mikulėnas	9 July 2002 (age 24)	1	0	(Lithuania) Sūduva	Estonia, 9 June 2026

Notes

- ^{PRE} = Preliminary squad.
- ^{WD} = The player withdrew from the current squad due to non-injury issue.
- ^{INJ} = It is not part of the current squad due to injury.
- ^{RET} = Retired from the national team.

== Player records ==
As of 4 October 2026
Players in bold are still active with Lithuania.

=== Most appearances ===
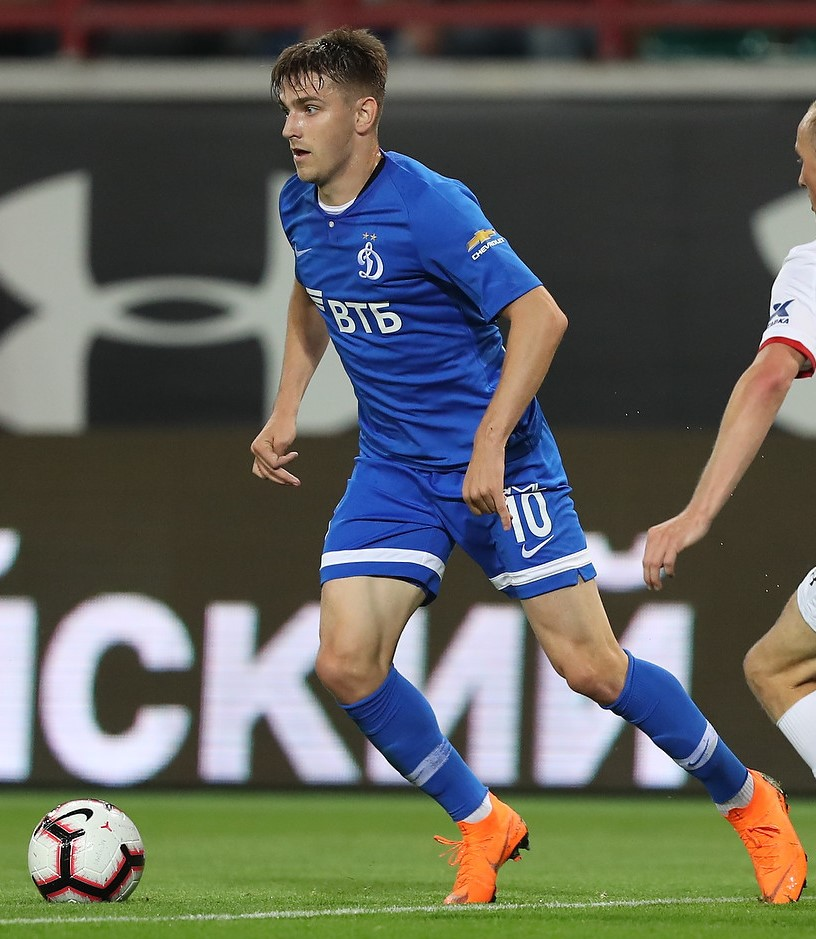
Fedor Černych is Lithuania's most capped player with 103 appearances.

Rank	Player	Caps	Goals	Career
1	**Fedor Černych**	103	15	2012–present
2	Saulius Mikoliūnas	101	5	2004–2022
3	**Arvydas Novikovas**	97	12	2010–present
4	Andrius Skerla	84	1	1996–2011
5	Deividas Šemberas	82	0	1996–2013
6	**Vykintas Slivka**	77	3	2015–present
7	**Justas Lasickas**	75	3	2018–present
8	Tomas Danilevičius	71	19	1998–2012
9	Žydrūnas Karčemarskas	66	0	2003–2013
10	Aurelijus Skarbalius	65	5	1991–2005
10	Marius Stankevičius	65	5	2001–2013

=== Top goalscorers ===
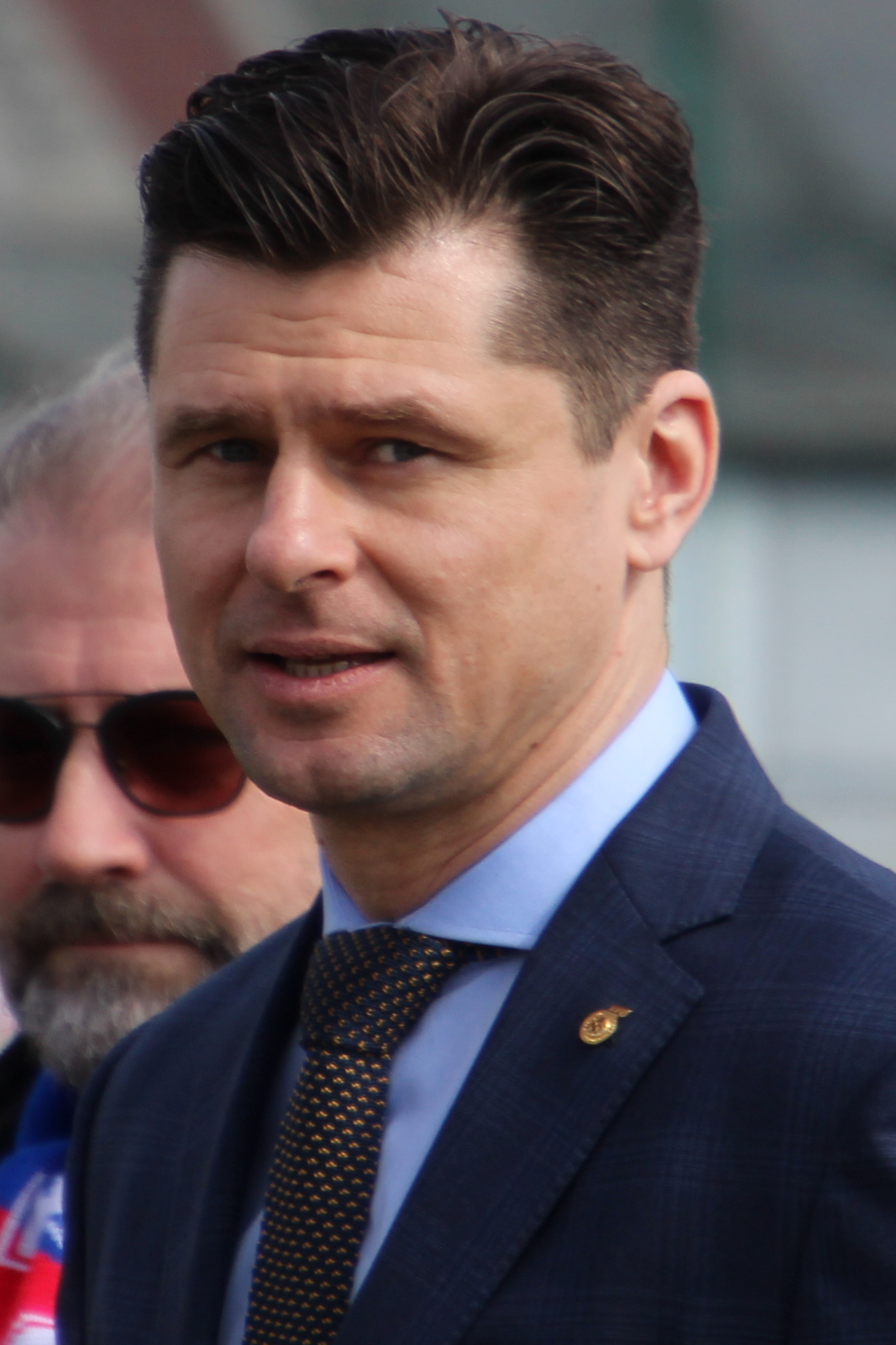
Tomas Danilevičius is Lithuania's top scorer with 19 goals.

Rank	Player	Goals	Caps	Ratio	Career
1	Tomas Danilevičius	19	71	0.27	1998–2012
2	**Fedor Černych**	15	103	0.15	2012–present
3	Antanas Lingis	12	33	0.36	1928–1938
3	**Arvydas Novikovas**	12	97	0.13	2010–present
5	Edgaras Jankauskas	10	56	0.18	1991–2008
6	Virginijus Baltušnikas	9	42	0.21	1990–1998
7	Jaroslavas Citavičius	8	24	0.33	1926–1933
7	Valdas Ivanauskas	8	28	0.29	1992–2000
7	Darius Maciulevičius	8	38	0.21	1991–2005
7	Robertas Poškus	8	48	0.17	1999–2011
7	**Armandas Kučys**	8	23	0.35	1921–present

== Competitive record ==
=== FIFA World Cup ===
FIFA World Cup record									Qualification record					
Year	Result	Position	Pld	W	D*	L	GF	GA	Pld	W	D	L	GF	GA
(Uruguay) 1930	Did not enter								Declined invitation					
(Italy) 1934	Did not qualify								1	0	0	1	0	2
(France) 1938	Did not qualify								2	0	0	2	3	9
(Brazil) 1950 to (Italy) 1990	Part of the Soviet Union								Part of the Soviet Union					
(United States) 1994	Did not qualify								12	2	3	7	8	21
(France) 1998	Did not qualify								10	5	2	3	11	8
(South Korea) (Japan) 2002	Did not qualify								8	0	2	6	3	20
(Germany) 2006	Did not qualify								10	2	4	4	8	9
(South Africa) 2010	Did not qualify								10	4	0	6	10	11
(Brazil) 2014	Did not qualify								10	3	2	5	9	11
(Russia) 2018	Did not qualify								10	1	3	6	7	20
(Qatar) 2022	Did not qualify								8	1	0	7	4	19
(Canada) (Mexico) (United States) 2026	Did not qualify								8	0	3	5	6	15
(Morocco) (Portugal) (Spain) 2030	To be determined								To be determined					
(Saudi Arabia) 2034	To be determined								To be determined					
Total		0/11							89	18	19	52	69	145

=== UEFA European Championship ===
UEFA European Championship record									Qualifying record					
Year	Result	Position	Pld	W	D*	L	GF	GA	Pld	W	D	L	GF	GA
(France) 1960	Part of the Soviet Union								Part of the Soviet Union					
(Spain) 1964	Part of the Soviet Union								Part of the Soviet Union					
(Italy) 1968	Part of the Soviet Union								Part of the Soviet Union					
(Belgium) 1972	Part of the Soviet Union								Part of the Soviet Union					
(Socialist Federal Republic of Yugoslavia) 1976	Part of the Soviet Union								Part of the Soviet Union					
(Italy) 1980	Part of the Soviet Union								Part of the Soviet Union					
(France) 1984	Part of the Soviet Union								Part of the Soviet Union					
(West Germany) 1988	Part of the Soviet Union								Part of the Soviet Union					
(Sweden) 1992	Part of the Soviet Union								Part of the Soviet Union					
(England) 1996	Did not qualify								10	5	1	4	13	12
(Belgium) (Netherlands) 2000	Did not qualify								10	3	2	5	8	16
(Portugal) 2004	Did not qualify								8	3	1	4	7	11
(Austria) (Switzerland) 2008	Did not qualify								12	5	1	6	11	13
(Poland) (Ukraine) 2012	Did not qualify								8	1	2	5	4	13
(France) 2016	Did not qualify								10	3	1	6	7	18
(European Union) 2020	Did not qualify								8	0	1	7	5	25
(Germany) 2024	Did not qualify								8	1	3	4	8	14
(England) (Scotland) (Republic of Ireland) (Wales) 2028	To be determined								To be determined					
(Italy) (Turkey) 2032	To be determined								To be determined					
Total		0/8							74	21	12	41	63	122

=== UEFA Nations League ===
UEFA Nations League record
Season**	Division	Group	Pld	W	D*	L	GF	GA	P/R	RK
2018–19	C	4	6	0	0	6	3	16	Same position	39th
2020–21	C	4	6	2	2	2	5	7	Same position	41st
2022–23	C	1	8	2	1	5	4	14	Same position	47th
2024–25	C	2	6	0	0	6	4	11	▼	48th
2026–27	D	2	4	2	1	1	5	3	▲	50th
Total			30	6	4	20	21	51	39th	

*Draws include knockout matches decided via penalty shoot-out.
**Group stage played home and away. Flag shown represents host nation for the finals stage.

=== Baltic Cup ===
Lithuania has appeared in all 31 editions of the Baltic Cup and has won the compeitition 10 times as of 2026. In the 2026 Baltic Cup, Lithuania beat Latvia 5-4 on penalties in the semi-finals before losing to Estonia in the final 1-0.

== Head-to-head record ==
As of 4 October 2026.

Opponent	P	W	D	L
Albania	6	3	1	2
Andorra	3	3	0	0
Argentina	1	0	1	0
Armenia	4	2	0	2
Austria	3	1	0	2
Azerbaijan	5	1	2	2
Belarus	10	1	4	5
Belgium	2	0	2	0
Bosnia and Herzegovina	6	1	1	4
Brazil	1	0	0	1
Bulgaria	5	2	1	2
Chile	1	0	0	1
Croatia	2	0	1	1
Cyprus	6	1	0	5
Czech Republic	7	1	0	6
Denmark	3	0	1	2
Egypt	1	0	0	1
England	4	0	0	4
Estonia	53	21	8	24
Faroe Islands	11	7	2	2
Finland	7	2	1	4
France	4	0	0	4
Georgia	9	3	1	5
Germany	2	0	1	1
Gibraltar	2	2	0	0
Greece	4	1	1	2
Hungary	7	0	2	5
Iceland	5	1	2	2
Indonesia	1	1	0	0
Iran	1	0	0	1
Israel	6	0	2	4
Italy	8	0	2	6
Jordan	1	0	0	1
Kazakhstan	3	1	1	1
Kuwait	2	0	1	1
Kosovo	3	0	0	3
Latvia	54	14	12	28
Liechtenstein	7	5	1	1
Luxembourg	6	1	1	4
North Macedonia	3	2	0	1
Mali	1	0	0	1
Malta	7	3	3	1
Moldova	9	3	4	2
Montenegro	4	0	1	3
Netherlands	2	0	0	2
New Zealand	1	1	0	0
Northern Ireland	4	0	1	3
Norway	2	0	0	2
Poland	13	2	4	7
Portugal	4	0	0	4
Republic of Ireland	5	0	1	4
Romania	15	1	0	14
Russia	4	0	1	3
San Marino	5	5	0	0
Saudi Arabia	1	0	1	0
Scotland	10	1	3	6
Serbia	11	1	0	10
Slovakia	4	0	2	2
Slovenia	6	2	2	2
Spain	7	0	1	6
Sri Lanka	2	1	1	0
Sweden	5	0	0	5
Switzerland	5	0	0	5
Turkmenistan	1	1	0	0
Turkey	2	0	0	2
Ukraine	10	2	1	7
United Arab Emirates	1	0	1	0

== Honours ==
=== Regional ===
- Baltic Cup
  - Champions (10): 1930, 1935, 1991, 1992, 1994, 1996, 1997, 1998, 2005, 2010
  - Runners-up (8): 1932, 1995, 2001, 2003, 2008, 2014, 2016, 2024, 2026
  - Third place (9): 1928, 1929, 1931, 1936, 1937, 1938, 1993, 2018, 2020

== See also ==
- Lithuania national under-21 football team
- Lithuania national under-19 football team
- Lithuania national under-18 football team
- Lithuania national under-17 football team
