= Kurt Shaw =

Maltese footballer

Personal information
- Date of birth: 1 April 1999 (age 27)
- Place of birth: Malta
- Height: 1.88 m (6 ft 2 in)
- Position: Defender

Team information
- Current team: Hibernians

Youth career
- Sliema Wanderers

Senior career*
Years	Team	Apps	(Gls)
2016–2022	Sliema Wanderers	93	(1)
2022–2025	Hibernians	73	(2)
2025–2026	Sorrento	6	(1)
2026–	Hibernians	0	(0)

International career^{‡}
2015	Malta U17	3	(0)
2016	Malta U19	2	(0)
2018–2019	Malta U21	11	(0)
2019–	Malta	43	(1)
- * Club domestic league appearances and goals as of 31 January 2026 ‡ National team caps and goals as of 22:50, 16 November 2026 (UTC)

Kurt Shaw (born 1 April 1999) is a Maltese footballer who plays as a defender or midfielder for Hibernians and the Malta national team.

== Career ==
Shaw made his international debut for Malta on 12 October 2019 in their 0–4 home loss in a UEFA Euro 2020 qualifying match against Sweden.

== Career statistics ==
=== International ===
Malta
Year	Apps	Goals
2019-2021	11	0
Total	11	0

Scores and results list Malta's goal tally first, score column indicates score after each Camenzuli goal.

List of international goals scored by David Affengruber
No.	Date	Venue	Cap	Opponent	Score	Result	Competition
1	16 November 2026	Europa Sports Park, Europa Point, Gibraltar	43	Gibraltar	1–0	1–1	2026–27 UEFA Nations League D
