= Guillaume López =

Andorran footballer (born 1999)

Personal information
- Full name: Guillaume Silvain López
- Date of birth: 30 January 1999 (age 27)
- Place of birth: Toulon, France
- Height: 1.70 m (5 ft 7 in)
- Position: Forward

Team information
- Current team: FC Santa Coloma
- Number: 10

Youth career
- Montpellier

Senior career*
Years	Team	Apps	(Gls)
2017–2019	Montpellier B	29	(7)
2019–2020	Marignane	11	(0)
2020–2021	Engordany	18	(16)
2021–2022	FC Santa Coloma	24	(21)
2022–2024	Atlètic d'Escaldes	51	(35)
2024–2025	Inter d'Escaldes	22	(20)
2025–	FC Santa Coloma	24	(16)

International career^{‡}
2025–	Andorra	18	(3)
- * Club domestic league appearances and goals as of 16 May 2025 ‡ National team caps and goals as of 15 November 2026

Guillaume Silvain López (born 30 January 1999) is a footballer who plays as a forward for FC Santa Coloma. Born in France, he is an Andorra international.

== Early life ==
López was born on 30 January 1999. Born in Toulon, France, he is a native of Toulon, France.

== Club career ==
As a youth player, López joined the youth academy of French Ligue 1 side Montpellier HSC and was promoted to the club's reserve team in 2017, where he made twenty-seven league appearances and scored seven goals. Two years later, he signed for French side Marignane Gignac Côte Bleue FC, where he made eleven league appearances and scored zero goals. In 2020, he signed for Andorran side UE Engordany, where he was the top scorer of the 2020–21 Primera Divisió with sixteen goals while playing for the club.

One year later, he signed for Andorran side FC Santa Coloma, where he made twenty-four league appearances and scored twenty-one goals. Ahead of the 2022–23 season he signed for Andorran side Atlètic Club d'Escaldes, here he was the top scorer of the 2023–24 Primera Divisió with twenty goals while playing for the club. During the summer of 2024, he signed for Andorran side Inter Club d'Escaldes.

== International career ==
López is an Andorra international. On 24 March 2025, he debuted for the Andorra national football team during a 0–3 away loss to the Albania national football team for 2026 FIFA World Cup qualification.

== Career statistics ==
=== International ===
As of match played 13 November 2026

Appearances and goals by national team and year
National team	Year	Apps	Goals
Andorra	2025	8	1
Andorra	2026	10	2
Total		18	3

Scores and results list Andorra's goal tally first, score column indicates score after each López goal.

List of international goals scored by Guillaume López
No.	Date	Venue	Opponent	Score	Result	Competition	Ref.
1	14 October 2025	Estadi de la FAF, Encamp, Andorra	Serbia	1–0	1–3	2026 FIFA World Cup qualification	
2	24 September 2026	Estadi de la FAF, Encamp, Andorra	Malta	1–0	1–2	2026–27 UEFA Nations League D	
2	13 November 2026	Estadi de la FAF, Encamp, Andorra	Gibraltar	1–0	2–0	2026–27 UEFA Nations League D	
