= Carlos Richards =

Gibraltarian footballer

Personal information
- Full name: Carlos Peliza Richards
- Date of birth: 22 June 2005 (age 21)
- Place of birth: London, England
- Position: Winger

Team information
- Current team: Three Bridges
- Number: 7

Youth career
- –2020: Chelsea
- 2020: West Ham United
- 2020–2024: Derby County

Senior career*
Years	Team	Apps	(Gls)
2022–2024	Derby County	1	(0)
2024–2025	Dorking Wanderers	0	(0)
2025	→ Dorking Wanderers B	1	(1)
2025–2026	Bromley	0	(0)
2025	→ Hampton & Richmond Borough (loan)	3	(0)
2026	→ Erith Town (loan)	8	(4)
2026	→ Three Bridges (loan)	7	(3)
2026–	Three Bridges	8	(0)

International career^{‡}
2021	Gibraltar U17	3	(0)
2023	Gibraltar U19	3	(0)
2023–	Gibraltar U21	10	(0)
2025–	Gibraltar	17	(1)
- * Club domestic league appearances and goals as of 18:04, 7 November 2026 (UTC) ‡ National team caps and goals as of 16 November 2026

Carlos Peliza Richards (born 22 June 2005) is a Gibraltarian professional footballer who plays as a winger for Isthmian League Premier Division side Three Bridges.

== Club career ==
Richards is product of the youth academies of Chelsea and Derby County, having joined Derby County reserves on 13 August 2021 after a stint at West Ham United. He worked his way up through Derby County's U18 and U23 sides, eventually moving to their first team in 2022. He made his professional debut with Derby County in a 2–1 EFL Championship win over Fulham on 15 April 2022, coming on as a late sub in the 90th minute.

After breaking into the club's under-21 team during the 2022–23 season, Richards signed his first professional contract with Derby County and was promoted to the under-21 squad on a full-time basis ahead of the 2023–24 season. Richards made 10 Premier League 2 appearances during this season for the under-21s. He was released by the club at the end of the 2023–24 season.

After spending several months without a club, Richards joined Dorking Wanderers in early December 2024, making his debut in their Surrey Senior Cup win against Lingfield. For the second half of the season, he went on to play for their B team in the tenth tier Southern Combination Football League Division One. He scored on his debut on 1 February 2025, in a 3–0 win over Montpelier Villa. In August 2025 he joined Bromley, playing for their U21 team in the Suburban League.

On 8 November 2025, Richards joined National League South side Hampton & Richmond Borough on a short-term loan. In January 2026, he joined Erith Town on loan. After impressing with four goals in eight games for the struggling Dockers, he joined title chasing Three Bridges in March 2026, scoring on his debut against Beckenham Town on 10 March. He joined on a permanent basis on 28 May.

== International career ==
Richards is a youth international for Gibraltar, having been called up to the Gibraltar U17s in October 2021. He registered an assist on his debut, sending in a free-kick for Jaiden Bartolo to head home in an eventual 6–1 defeat to Bosnia and Herzegovina on 7 August 2021. In September 2023, he accepted a call-up to the U21 squad for the first time. He made his senior international debut in a 3–1 defeat to Montenegro on 22 March 2025, starting the game and playing the full 90 minutes.

== Career statistics ==
=== Club ===
As of match played 7 November 2026

Appearances and goals by club, season and competition
Club	Season	League			FA Cup		EFL Cup		Other		Total	
Club	Season	Division	Apps	Goals	Apps	Goals	Apps	Goals	Apps	Goals	Apps	Goals
Derby County	2022–23	Championship	1	0	0	0	0	0	0	0	1	0
Derby County	2023–24	League One	0	0	0	0	0	0	0	0	0	0
Derby County	Total		1	0	0	0	0	0	0	0	1	0
Dorking Wanderers	2024–25	National League South	0	0	0	0	—		1 (Note: Appearance in Surrey Senior Cup.)	0	1	0
Dorking Wanderers B	2024–25	Southern Combination Division One	1	1	—		—		1 (Note: Appearance in Division One Challenge Cup.)	0	2	1
Bromley	2025–26	League Two	0	0	0	0	0	0	2 (Note: Appearances in London Senior Cup.)	0	2	0
Hampton & Richmond Borough (loan)	2025–26	National League South	3	0	0	0	—		0	0	3	0
Erith Town (loan)	2025–26	Isthmian League South East	8	4	0	0	—		0	0	8	4
Three Bridges (loan)	2025–26	Isthmian League South East	7	3	0	0	—		1 (Note: Appearances in Sussex Senior Cup.)	0	8	3
Three Bridges	2026–27	Isthmian League Premier	8	0	0	0	—		3 (Note: 1 appearance in Sussex Community Shield, 1 appearance in Sussex Senior Cup, 1 appearance in FA Trophy.)	0	11	0
Three Bridges	Total		15	3	0	0	0	0	4	0	19	3
Career total			28	8	0	0	0	0	8	0	36	8

=== International ===
As of 16 November 2026

Gibraltar
Year	Apps	Goals
2025	9	0
2026	8	1
Total	17	1

List of international goals scored by Carlos Richards
No.	Date	Venue	Cap	Opponent	Score	Result	Competition	Ref.
1	16 November 2026	Europa Sports Stadium, Gibraltar	17	Malta	1–1	1–1	2026–27 UEFA Nations League D	

== Honours ==
With Three Bridges

- Isthmian League Division One South East: 2025–26
- Sussex Community Shield: 2026
