= 2026–27 UEFA Nations League D =

Tournament details
- Dates: 24 September – 16 November 2026
- Teams: 6
- Promoted: Andorra; Azerbaijan; Gibraltar; Liechtenstein; Lithuania; Malta

Tournament statistics
- Matches played: 12
- Goals scored: 19 (1.58 per match)
- Attendance: 35,217 (2,935 per match)
- Top scorer(s): (Andorra) Guillaume López (Azerbaijan) Mahir Emreli (Malta) Teddy Teuma (2 goals each)

The 2026–27 UEFA Nations League D was the fifth and final season of the fourth and lowest division of the 2026–27 edition of the UEFA Nations League, an international football competition involving the men's national teams of the member associations of UEFA.

== Format ==
League D consisted of the six lowest-ranked UEFA members from 49–54 in the 2024–25 UEFA Nations League final overall ranking, split into two groups of three. Each team played four matches within their group, using the home-and-away round-robin on matchdays in September, October, and November 2026.

Originally, the format for promotion and relegation would have involved only the group winners of League D being promoted, as well as the two worst last-placed teams in League C being relegated. The promotion/relegation play-offs would have concerned all runners-up in League C, with extra play-offs concerning the two best last-places in League C and both runners-up in League D to be held in March 2028. However, due to the changes scheduled for the 2028–29 UEFA Nations League, in which the competition will be reduced from four leagues to three leagues of 18 teams, promotion/relegation was rebalanced to make all three upcoming leagues be at 18 teams. This made the 2026–27 UEFA Nations League the final edition to include League D. Due to the removal of League D for the 2028–29 edition of the Nations League, all teams would be promoted to League C, and the matches they played in this edition were used for the final overall ranking only.

== Teams ==
League D included six teams based on the results of the 2024–25 season: the two worst-ranked group fourth-placed teams teams from League C, the two losers of the League C/D play-offs and the two third-placed teams from League D.

=== Team changes ===
The following were the team changes in League D from the 2024–25 season:

Incoming
Relegated from
Nations League C
- Azerbaijan
- Lithuania

Outgoing
Promoted to
Nations League C
- Moldova
- San Marino

=== Seeding ===
Teams were seeded for the league phase based on the 2024–25 Nations League final overall ranking, considering promotion and relegation between the leagues.

Pot 1
Team	Rank
Azerbaijan	49
Lithuania	50
Malta (Note: The identity of the two promotion/relegation play-off winners was not known at the time of the draw.)	51
Gibraltar	52

Pot 2
Team	Rank
Liechtenstein	53
Andorra	54

The draw for the league phase took place in Brussels, Belgium, on 12 February 2026, 18:00 CET. Groups were drawn to contain two teams from pot 1 and one team from pot 2.

== Groups ==
The fixture list was confirmed by UEFA on 13 February 2026, the day following the draw.

Times are CET/CEST, (Note: CEST (UTC+2) for matchdays 1–4 (September and October 2026), CET (UTC+1) for matchdays 5–6 (November 2026).) as listed by UEFA (local times, if different, are in parentheses).

=== Group 1 ===
Pos	Team	Pld	W	D	L	GF	GA	GD	Pts	Promotion	(Malta)	(Andorra)	(Gibraltar)
1	Malta (P)	4	2	2	0	5	3	+2	8	Promotion to League C	—	1–0	1–1
2	Andorra (P)	4	1	1	2	3	3	0	4	Promotion to League C	1–2	—	2–0
3	Gibraltar (P)	4	0	3	1	2	4	−2	3	Promotion to League C	1–1	0–0	—

Source: UEFA
Rules for classification: Tiebreakers
(P) Promoted
24 September 2026
18:00

Andorra	1–2	Malta
López 17'	Report	Cardona 36'; Teuma 81'

Estadi de la FAF, Encamp
Attendance: 905
Referee: Joey Kooij (Netherlands)

27 September 2026
18:00

Gibraltar	0–0	Andorra
	Report

Europa Sports Park, Gibraltar
Attendance: 1,382
Referee: Genc Nuza (Kosovo)

1 October 2026
20:45

Malta	1–1	Gibraltar
Mbong 53'	Report	Scanlon 61'

National Stadium, Ta' Qali
Attendance: 4,090
Referee: Antoni Bandić (Bosnia and Herzegovina)

4 October 2026
18:00

Malta	1–0	Andorra
Teuma 49'	Report

National Stadium, Ta' Qali
Attendance: 5,894
Referee: Mikkel Redder (Denmark)

13 November 2026
20:45

Andorra	2–0	Gibraltar
López 24'; Rosas 35'	Report

Estadi de la FAF, Encamp
Attendance: 710
Referee: Rob Hennessy (Republic of Ireland)

16 November 2026
20:45

Gibraltar	1–1	Malta
Richards 81'	Report	Shaw 19'

Europa Sports Park, Gibraltar
Attendance: 1,095
Referee: Balázs Berke (Hungary)

=== Group 2 ===
Pos	Team	Pld	W	D	L	GF	GA	GD	Pts	Promotion	(Azerbaijan)	(Lithuania)	(Liechtenstein)
1	Azerbaijan (P)	4	2	2	0	3	1	+2	8	Promotion to League C	—	1–0	0–0
2	Lithuania (P)	4	2	1	1	5	3	+2	7	Promotion to League C	1–1	—	2–1
3	Liechtenstein (P)	4	0	1	3	1	5	−4	1	Promotion to League C	0–1	0–2	—

Source: UEFA
Rules for classification: Tiebreakers
(P) Promoted
24 September 2026
20:45

Liechtenstein	0–2	Lithuania
	Report	Michelbrink 53'; Dolžnikov 66'

Rheinpark Stadion, Vaduz
Attendance: 1,055
Referee: Ante Čulina (Croatia)

27 September 2026
15:00 (16:00 UTC+3)

Lithuania	1–1	Azerbaijan
Kučys 9' (pen.)	Report	Emreli 14'

Darius and Girėnas Stadium, Kaunas
Attendance: 7,539
Referee: Menelaos Antoniou (Cyprus)

1 October 2026
18:00 (20:00 UTC+4)

Azerbaijan	0–0	Liechtenstein
	Report

Tofiq Bahramov Republican Stadium, Baku
Attendance: 4,200
Referee: Christian-Petru Ciochirca (Austria)

4 October 2026
15:00 (17:00 UTC+4)

Azerbaijan	1–0	Lithuania
Khaybulayev 25'	Report

Neftçi Arena, Baku
Attendance: 5,000
Referee: Gustavo Correia (Portugal)

13 November 2026
20:45

Liechtenstein	0–1	Azerbaijan
	Report	Emreli 26'

Rheinpark Stadion, Vaduz
Attendance: 1,071
Referee: Kristo Tohver (Estonia)

16 November 2026
18:00 (19:00 UTC+2)

Lithuania	2–1	Liechtenstein
Jankauskas 16'; Ruzgis 50' (pen.)	Report	Sele 60'

Darius and Girėnas Stadium, Kaunas
Attendance: 2,276
Referee: Allard Lindhout (Netherlands)

== Goalscorers ==
There were 19 goals scored in 12 matches, for an average of 1.58 goals per match.

2 goals

- (Andorra national football team) Guillaume López
- (Azerbaijan national football team) Mahir Emreli
- (Malta national football team) Teddy Teuma

1 goal

- (Andorra national football team) Albert Rosas
- (Azerbaijan national football team) Abdulakh Khaybulayev
- (Gibraltar national football team) Carlos Richards
- (Gibraltar national football team) James Scanlon
- (Liechtenstein national football team) Aron Sele
- (Lithuania national football team) Artūr Dolžnikov
- (Lithuania national football team) Eligijus Jankauskas
- (Lithuania national football team) Armandas Kučys
- (Lithuania national football team) Lukas Michelbrink
- (Lithuania national football team) Manfredas Ruzgis
- (Malta national football team) Irvin Cardona
- (Malta national football team) Joseph Mbong
- (Malta national football team) Kurt Shaw

== Overall ranking ==
Following the league phase, the six League D teams were ordered 49th to 54th in an interim overall ranking for the 2026–27 UEFA Nations League according to the following rules:

- The teams finishing first in the groups were ranked 49th to 50th according to the results of the league phase.
- The teams finishing second in the groups were ranked 51st to 52nd according to the results of the league phase.
- The teams finishing third in the groups were ranked 53rd to 54th according to the results of the league phase.

Rnk	Grp	Team	Pld	W	D	L	GF	GA	GD	Pts
49	D1	Malta	4	2	2	0	5	3	+2	8
50	D2	Azerbaijan	4	2	2	0	3	1	+2	8
51	D2	Lithuania	4	2	1	1	5	3	+2	7
52	D1	Andorra	4	1	1	2	3	3	0	4
53	D1	Gibraltar	4	0	3	1	2	4	−2	3
54	D2	Liechtenstein	4	0	1	3	1	5	−4	1

Source: UEFA
Rules for classification: Ranking criteria

A final overall ranking will also be compiled, though this is only used to rank teams within their new leagues for the following edition of the competition.
