= Edgaras Utkus =

Lithuanian footballer (born 2000)

Personal information
- Date of birth: 22 June 2000 (age 26)
- Place of birth: Radviliškis, Lithuania
- Height: 1.87 m (6 ft 2 in)
- Positions: Midfielder; defender

Team information
- Current team: Al-Kholood
- Number: 3

Youth career
- 2015–2018: NFA
- 2018–2019: Monaco

Senior career*
Years	Team	Apps	(Gls)
2019–2021	Monaco B	8	(0)
2021–2026	Cercle Brugge	100	(6)
2026–	Al-Kholood	22	(2)

International career^{‡}
2016	Lithuania U16	2	(0)
2015–2016	Lithuania U17	11	(1)
2017	Lithuania U18	4	(1)
2017–2018	Lithuania U19	15	(3)
2018–2021	Lithuania U21	11	(1)
2020–	Lithuania	30	(0)
- * Club domestic league appearances and goals as of 10 September 2026 ‡ National team caps and goals as of 4 October 2026 (UTC)

Edgaras Utkus (born 22 June 2000) is a Lithuanian professional footballer who plays as a midfielder or defender for Saudi Pro League club Al-Kholood and the Lithuania national team.

== Career ==
=== Monaco ===
In 2019, Utkus signed his first professional contract with Monaco. In France he played from summer of the 2019. He appeared for the reserves, competing in Championnat National 2.

=== Cercle Brugge ===
In the summer of 2021, Utkus moved to Belgian First Division A club Cercle Brugge. He made his debut on 24 July 2021 in a match against Beerschot which was interrupted after 55 minutes due to heavy rainfall. The match was continued on 27 July, and ended in a 1–0 win for Cercle. Despite being a midfielder, Utkus lined up in the right side of central defense, where he kept a clean sheet.

On 4 August 2022, Cercle Brugge announced that Utkus had suffered a tear in the anterior cruciate ligament and a tear in the meniscus of his knee, which required surgery. The injury effectively ended his season. Despite the severity of his injury, he extended his contract with the club on 23 April 2023, signing a deal until 2026.

== International career ==
Utkus made his international debut for the Lithuania national team on 11 November 2020 in a friendly match against the Faroe Islands.

== Career statistics ==
=== International ===
As of 11 June 2022

Appearances and goals by national team and year
National team	Year	Apps	Goals
Lithuania	2020	2	0
Lithuania	2021	3	0
Lithuania	2022	5	0
Lithuania	2023	4	0
Total		14	0
