= Lukas Michelbrink =

Lithuanian footballer (born 2005)

Personal information
- Date of birth: 15 April 2005 (age 21)
- Place of birth: Berlin, Germany
- Height: 1.81 m (5 ft 11 in)
- Position: Midfielder

Team information
- Current team: Energie Cottbus (on loan from Hertha BSC)
- Number: 8

Youth career
- –2017: Berolina Stralau
- 2017–2025: Hertha BSC

Senior career*
Years	Team	Apps	(Gls)
2024–	Hertha BSC II	23	(0)
2025–	→ Energie Cottbus (loan)	41	(1)

International career^{‡}
2022	Germany U18	1	(0)
2022–2023	Lithuania U19	7	(1)
2025	Lithuania U21	4	(0)
2026–	Lithuania	8	(1)
- * Club domestic league appearances and goals as of 15:02, 18 November 2026 (UTC) ‡ National team caps and goals as of 15:02, 18 November 2026 (UTC)

Lukas Michelbrink (born 15 May 2005) is a professional footballer who plays as a midfielder for 2. Bundesliga club Energie Cottbus, on loan from Hertha BSC. Born in Germany, he plays for the Lithuania national team.

== Early life ==
Michelbrink was born on 15 May 2005, in Berlin, Germany.

== Club career ==
As a youth player, Michelbrink joined the youth academy of German side Berolina Stralau. Following his stint there, he joined the youth academy of German side Hertha BSC in 2017 and was promoted to the club's senior team in 2024.

Ahead of the 2025–26 season, he was sent on loan to German side Energie Cottbus. German magazine kicker wrote in 2026 that he "established himself" while playing for the club. On 28 May 2026, the loan was extended for the 2026–27 season, after the club was promoted to the 2. Bundesliga.

== International career ==
Michelbrink is a Lithuania international. During the autumn of 2023, he played for the Lithuania national under-19 team in the 2024 UEFA European Under-19 Championship qualification.

== Career statistics ==
=== International ===
As of match played 4 October 2026

Appearances and goals by national team and year
National team	Year	Apps	Goals
Lithuania
Lithuania	2026	8	1
Total		8	1

Scores and results list Lithuania's goal tally first, score column indicates score after each Michelbrink goal.

List of international goals scored by Lukas Michelbrink
No.	Date	Venue	Opponent	Score	Result	Competition
1	24 September 2026	Rheinpark Stadion, Vaduz, Liechtenstein	Liechtenstein	1–0	2–0	2026–27 UEFA Nations League D
