= Eligijus Jankauskas =

Lithuanian footballer (born 1998)

Personal information
- Date of birth: 22 June 1998 (age 28)
- Place of birth: Šiauliai, Lithuania
- Height: 1.77 m (5 ft 10 in)
- Position: Winger

Team information
- Current team: Hapoel Rishon LeZion F.C.
- Number: 71

Youth career
- –2006: FK Napolis
- 2006–2014: Siauliai FA

Senior career*
Years	Team	Apps	(Gls)
2014–2015	Šiauliai	16	(0)
2016	Utenis Utena	14	(3)
2016	Sūduva Marijampolė	18	(2)
2017–2018	Žilina B	16	(5)
2017–2018	Žilina	4	(0)
2018	→ Zemplín Michalovce (loan)	8	(0)
2018	Opava	0	(0)
2019–2020	Sūduva	35	(11)
2021	Panevėžys	25	(2)
2022–2025	Šiauliai	117	(38)
2026–	Hapoel Rishon LeZion	28	(11)

International career^{‡}
2014	Lithuania U-17	3	(0)
2016	Lithuania U-19	3	(0)
2016–2020	Lithuania U-21	29	(1)
2021–	Lithuania	20	(1)
- * Club domestic league appearances and goals as of 22 June 2026 ‡ National team caps and goals as of 18 November 2026

Eligijus Jankauskas (born 22 June 1998) is a Lithuanian professional footballer who currently plays for as a winger for Hapoel Rishon LeZion F.C..

== Club career ==
=== Lithuanian clubs ===
Eligijus Jankauskas started his career in his local club, FK Šiauliai. At the time he played for highest tier league in Lithuania. His career at Šiauliai took two seasons. Jankauskas played sixteen matches for this club.

In the 2016 season, Jankauskas joined FK Utenis Utena. In the middle of the season, he moved to FK Sūduva Marijampolė helping them gain third place at the table.

At the end of the 2016 season Jankauskas was named the most prospective player in Lithuania. At the same ceremony, Fedor Černych was named the best Lithuanian player of 2016.

In 2017, he joined the Slovak team MŠK Žilina.

=== MŠK Žilina ===
He made his professional Fortuna Liga debut for MŠK Žilina against FO ŽP Šport Podbrezová on 27 May 2017. Eligijus was given the number 29, when he arrived to the club. Jankauskas also played few matches for second MŠK Žilina team - MŠK Žilina B, which at the time played in 2. Liga and ended up in fourth position 2016-17 season.

=== FA Šiauliai ===
In December 2021 announced, that Eligijus Jankauskas returned back to FA Šiauliai.

=== Hapoel Rishon LeZion FC ===
On 21 January announced that Eligijus Jankauskas signed with Hapoel Rishon LeZion.

== International career ==
He made his debut for the Lithuania national football team on 2 September 2021 in a World Cup qualifier against the Northern Ireland, a 1–4 home loss. He substituted Fedor Černych in the 80th minute.

== Career statistics ==
=== International goals ===
As of match played 16 November 2026

Scores and results list Lithuania's goal tally first, score column indicates score after each Jankauskas goal.

List of international goals scored by Eligijus Jankauskas
No.	Date	Venue	Cap	Opponent	Score	Result	Competition
1	16 November 2026	Darius and Girėnas Stadium, Kaunas, Lithuania	20	Liechtenstein	1–0	2–1	2026–27 UEFA Nations League D

== Honours ==
=== Club ===
MŠK Žilina

- Fortuna Liga: 2016–17

FK Sūduva

- Super Cup winner: 2019

=== Individual ===
- The most prospective player playing in Lithuania: 2016
