= Modestas Vorobjovas =

Lithuanian footballer

Personal information
- Date of birth: 30 December 1995 (age 30)
- Place of birth: Vilnius, Lithuania
- Height: 1.77 m (5 ft 10 in)
- Position: Midfielder

Team information
- Current team: Bnei Sakhnin
- Number: 8

Youth career
- –2013: Šiauliai

Senior career*
Years	Team	Apps	(Gls)
2013–2015	Šiauliai	63	(0)
2016–2018	Trakai	77	(4)
2019–2020	Žalgiris	44	(1)
2021–2022	UTA Arad	53	(3)
2022–2023	Chindia Târgoviște	33	(0)
2023–2026	İstanbulspor	92	(2)
2026–	Bnei Sakhnin	0	(0)

International career^{‡}
2013	Lithuania U19	2	(0)
2017–	Lithuania	55	(1)
- * Club domestic league appearances and goals as of 25 September 2026 ‡ National team caps and goals as of 4 October 2026

Modestas Vorobjovas (born 30 December 1995) is a Lithuanian professional footballer who plays as a midfielder for Israeli Premier League club Bnei Sakhnin and the Lithuania national team.

== International career ==
Vorobjovas made his international debut for Lithuania in 2018.

=== International stats ===
Lithuania national team
Year	Apps	Goals
2017	0	0
2018	11	0
2019	6	0
2020	5	1
2021	0	0
2022	4	0
Total	26	1

=== International goals ===
Scores and results list Lithuania's goal tally first.

No.	Date	Venue	Opponent	Score	Result	Competition
1.	18 November 2020	Almaty Central Stadium, Almaty, Kazakhstan	Kazakhstan	1–1	2–1	2020–21 UEFA Nations League C

== Honours ==
Šiauliai

- Lithuanian Cup runner-up: 2012–13

Trakai

- A Lyga runner-up: 2016
- Lithuanian Cup runner-up: 2015–16

Žalgiris

- A Lyga: 2020
- Lithuanian Supercup: 2020
