= Manfredas Ruzgis =

German-born Lithuanian footballer

Personal information
- Date of birth: 5 January 1997 (age 29)
- Place of birth: Siegen, Germany
- Height: 1.93 m (6 ft 4 in)
- Position: Striker

Youth career
- –2014: Sportfreunde Siegen
- 2014–2016: SC Paderborn 07

Senior career*
Years	Team	Apps	(Gls)
2014–2016	SC Paderborn 07 II	1	(0)
2016–2018	1. FC Köln II	35	(3)
2020–2021	FC UNA Strassen	4	(1)
2021–2023	SC Wiedenbrück	53	(14)
2023–2024	Rot-Weiß Oberhausen	16	(0)
2024	SC Wiedenbrück	14	(3)
2024–2026	FK Vora	35	(25)
2026–	Besa Kavajë	10	(6)

International career^{‡}
2016–2018	Lithuania U21	7	(1)
2016–	Lithuania	6	(2)
- * Club domestic league appearances and goals as of 13 May 2026 ‡ National team caps and goals as of 25 September 2025

Manfredas Ruzgis (born 5 January 1997) is a footballer who plays as a striker for Albanian club FK Vora. Born in Germany, he represents Lithuania at international level. His father Kęstutis Ruzgys was also a footballer.

== Club career ==
On 29 July 2016 Ruzgis moved to 1. FC Köln II.

== International career ==
Ruzgis was born in Germany and is of Lithuanian descent. Ruzgis made his debut for the Lithuania U21 on 1 September 2016 in the 2017 UEFA European Under-21 Championship qualification against Andorra.

In November 2016 Ruzgis received his first call-up to the senior Lithuania squad for a match against Slovakia.

=== International goals ===
As of match played 16 November 2026

List of international goals scored by Faustas Steponavičius
No.	Date	Venue	Opponent	Score	Result	Competition
1	30 September 2026	Darius and Girėnas Stadium, Kaunas, Lithuania	Andorra	1–0	3–0	Friendly
2	16 November 2026	Darius and Girėnas Stadium, Kaunas, Lithuania	Liechtenstein	2–0	2–1	2026–27 UEFA Nations League D

== Honours ==
Vora

- Kategoria e Parë: 2024–25
