= Aron Sele =

Liechtenstein footballer

Personal information
- Full name: Aron Sele
- Date of birth: 2 September 1996 (age 30)
- Place of birth: Switzerland
- Height: 1.68 m (5 ft 6 in)
- Position: Midfielder

Team information
- Current team: Young Fellows Juventus
- Number: 18

Youth career
- 2009–2014: Balzers

Senior career*
Years	Team	Apps	(Gls)
2014–2015	Triesen	0	(0)
2015–2018	Balzers	65	(4)
2018–2020	Vaduz	21	(1)
2020–2023	Chur 97	48	(3)
2023–2024	Eschen/Mauren	26	(3)
2024–	Young Fellows Juventus	28	(0)

International career^{‡}
2010–2012	Liechtenstein U17	8	(0)
2014	Liechtenstein U19	3	(0)
2015–2017	Liechtenstein U21	11	(0)
2016–	Liechtenstein	82	(3)
- * Club domestic league appearances and goals as of 6 June 2026 ‡ National team caps and goals as of 16 November 2026

Aron Sele (born 2 September 1996) is a Liechtensteiner footballer who currently plays for Young Fellows Juventus.

== Club career ==
Sele began his career in the youth ranks of Balzers, where he would also play for the senior side from 2015-2018 after beginning his career at Triesen.

He turned professional after signing with Vaduz of the Swiss Challenge League in 2018. Sele would make 21 league appearances for the Residenzler over two seasons before departing for fifth-tier side Chur 97.

Following the 2022-2023 campaign, Sele returned to the principality, signing with Eschen/Mauren of the 1. Liga Classic, before moving to Zürich and fellow fourth-tier unit Young Fellows Juventus with Liechtensteiner compatriot Maximilian Göppel ahead of the 2024-2025 season.

== International career ==
He is a member of the Liechtenstein national football team, making his debut in a friendly match against Iceland on 6 June 2016. Sele also made 11 appearances for the Liechtenstein U21.

=== International goals ===
No.	Date	Venue	Opponent	Score	Result	Competition
1.	18 November 2024	Rheinpark Stadion, Vaduz, Liechtenstein	San Marino	1–0	1–3	2024–25 UEFA Nations League D
2.	13 October 2025	Podgorica City Stadium, Podgorica, Montenegro	Montenegro	1–0	1–2	Friendly
3.	16 November 2026	Darius and Girėnas Stadium, Kaunas, Lithuania	Lithuania	1–2	1–2	2026–27 UEFA Nations League D

== Personal life ==
Aron's father, Rolf, earned three caps for Liechtenstein in the 1990s.

== Honours ==
FC Vaduz

- Liechtenstein Football Cup (1): 2018-19
