= Abdulakh Khaybulayev =

Azerbaijani footballer (born 2001)

Personal information
- Full name: Abdulakh Tilovurovich Khaybulayev
- Date of birth: 19 August 2001 (age 25)
- Place of birth: Khasavyurt, Dagestan Republic, Russia
- Height: 1.78 m (5 ft 10 in)
- Position: Midfielder

Team information
- Current team: Sabah
- Number: 6

Youth career
- Anzhi Makhachkala

Senior career*
Years	Team	Apps	(Gls)
2021–	Sabah	70	(2)
2023	→ Samtredia (loan)	29	(4)

International career^{‡}
2022	Azerbaijan U21	4	(1)
2025–	Azerbaijan	13	(1)
- * Club domestic league appearances and goals as of 5 October 2026 ‡ National team caps and goals as of 15 November 2026 (UTC)

Abdulakh Tilovurovich Khaybulayev (Azerbaijani: Abdullah Tilovur oğlu Xaybulayev; Russian: Абдулах Тиловурович Хайбулаев; born on 19 August 2001) is a professional footballer who plays as a midfielder for Azerbaijan Premier League club Sabah. Born in Russia, he plays for the Azerbaijan national team.

== Career ==
On 4 May 2021, Khaybulayev made his debut in the Azerbaijan Premier League for Sabah in a match against Sumgayit.

On 28 January 2023, Khaybulayev joined Samtredia on loan until December 2023.

=== International goals ===
As of match played 13 November 2026

Appearances and goals by national team and year
National team	Year	Apps	Goals
Azerbaijan	2025	5	0
Azerbaijan	2026	8	1
Total		13	1

Scores and results list Azerbaijan's goal tally first, score column indicates score after each Khaybulayev goal

List of international goals scored by Abdulakh Khaybulayev
No.	Date	Venue	Opponent	Score	Result	Competition
1	4 October 2026	Neftçi Arena, Baku, Azerbaijan	Lithuania	1–0	1–0	2026–27 UEFA Nations League D

== Honours ==
Sabah

- Azerbaijan Premier League: 2025–26
- Azerbaijan Cup: 2024–25, 2025–26
