= Armandas Kučys =

Lithuanian footballer

Personal information
- Date of birth: 27 February 2003 (age 23)
- Place of birth: Panevėžys, Lithuania
- Height: 1.94 m (6 ft 4 in)
- Position: Forward

Team information
- Current team: Celje
- Number: 47

Youth career
- –2018: Panevėžio FA
- 2019: Panevėžys
- 2020: Ekranas
- 2021–2022: Kalmar FF

Senior career*
Years	Team	Apps	(Gls)
2022–2023	Kalmar FF	0	(0)
2022–2023	→ Oskarshamns AIK (loan)	12	(1)
2023–2024	Kauno Žalgiris	31	(9)
2023–2024	Kauno Žalgiris B	4	(4)
2024–	Celje	41	(19)

International career^{‡}
2019	Lithuania U17	6	(1)
2021	Lithuania U19	7	(4)
2021–	Lithuania	23	(8)
- * Club domestic league appearances and goals as of 2 November 2026 ‡ National team caps and goals as of 4 October 2026

Armandas Kučys (born 27 February 2003) is a Lithuanian professional footballer who plays as a forward for Slovenian club Celje and the Lithuania national team.

== International career ==
He made his debut for Lithuania national team on 15 November 2021 in a friendly against Kuwait.

== Personal life ==
His father Aurimas Kučys was a former Lithuanian international footballer.

== Career statistics ==
=== Club ===
As of match played 2 November 2026

Appearances and goals by club, season and competition
Club	Season	League			National cup (Note: Includes Lithuanian Cup, Slovenian Cup)		Europe		Total	
Club	Season	Division	Apps	Goals	Apps	Goals	Apps	Goals	Apps	Goals
Oskarshamns AIK (loan)	2022	Ettan	12	1	0	0	—		12	1
Kauno Žalgiris	2023	A Lyga	16	3	2	1	2 (Note: Appearances in UEFA Conference League)	0	20	4
Kauno Žalgiris	2024	A Lyga	15	6	1	1	—		16	7
Kauno Žalgiris	Total		31	9	3	2	2	0	36	11
Celje	2024–25	PrvaLiga	18	10	1	0	14 (Note: Four appearances in UEFA Champions League, two appearances in UEFA Europa League, eight appearances and eight goals in UEFA Conference League)	8	33	18
Celje	2025–26	PrvaLiga	13	7	0	0	4	1	17	8
Celje	2026–27	PrvaLiga	10	2	0	0	0	0	10	2
Celje	Total		41	19	1	0	18	9	60	28
Career total			84	29	4	2	20	9	108	30

=== International ===
As of match played 4 October 2026

Appearances and goals by national team and year
National team	Year	Apps	Goals
Lithuania	2021	1	0
Lithuania	2022	3	0
Lithuania	2023	1	0
Lithuania	2024	8	4
Lithuania	2025	2	1
Lithuania	2026	8	3
Total		23	8

Scores and results list Lithuania's goal tally first, score column indicates score after each Kučys goal.

List of international goals scored by Armandas Kučys
No.	Date	Venue	Opponent	Score	Result	Competition
1	21 March 2024	Estádio Algarve, Faro/Loulé, Portugal	Gibraltar	1–0	1–0	2022–23 UEFA Nations League C
2	8 June 2024	Daugava Stadium, Liepāja, Latvia	Latvia	0–1	0–2	2024 Baltic Cup
3	9 September 2024	Stadionul Steaua, Bucharest, Romania	Romania	1–1	1–3	2024–25 UEFA Nations League C
4	15 October 2024	Darius and Girėnas Stadium, Kaunas, Lithuania	Romania	1–0	1–2	2024–25 UEFA Nations League C
5	24 March 2025	Finland	Darius and Girėnas Stadium, Kaunas, Lithuania	1–2	2–2	2026 FIFA World Cup qualification
6	6 June 2026	Latvia	Darius and Girėnas Stadium, Kaunas, Lithuania	1–0	1–1 (5–4 p)	2026 Baltic Cup
7	27 September 2026	Azerbaijan	Darius and Girėnas Stadium, Kaunas, Lithuania	1–0	1–1	2026–27 UEFA Nations League D
8	30 September 2026	Andorra	Darius and Girėnas Stadium, Kaunas, Lithuania	3–0	3–0	Friendly

== Honours ==
Celje

- Slovenian PrvaLiga: 2025–26
- Slovenian Cup: 2024–25
