= Artūr Dolžnikov =

Lithuanian footballer (born 2000)

Personal information
- Date of birth: 6 June 2000 (age 26)
- Place of birth: Lithuania
- Height: 1.76 m (5 ft 9 in)
- Positions: Winger; forward

Team information
- Current team: SK Sigma Olomouc
- Number: 77

Senior career*
Years	Team	Apps	(Gls)
–2017	Žalgiris B		
2018	FK Be1		
2018–2019	Riteriai B		
2019	Riteriai	3	(0)
2019–2020	Baltijos Futbolo Akademija		
2020	Vilniaus Vytis		
2021–2022	Riteriai	44	(6)
2023–2024	Kauno Žalgiris	56	(6)
2025–	Sigma Olomouc	21	(2)
2025–	→ Sigma Olomouc B	4	(0)

International career^{‡}
2016	Lithuania U16	2	(0)
2016	Lithuania U17	1	(1)
2017–2018	Lithuania U19	16	(2)
2019–2022	Lithuania U21	6	(1)
2022–	Lithuania	25	(2)
- * Club domestic league appearances and goals as of 27 May 2026 ‡ National team caps and goals as of 4 October 2026

Artūr Dolžnikov (born 6 June 2000) is a Lithuanian footballer who plays as a winger or forward for SK Sigma Olomouc and Lithuania national football team.

== Club career ==
In 2019, Dolžnikov signed for Lithuanian side FK Riteriai, where he made three league appearances and scored zero goals. The same year, he signed for Lithuanian side Baltijos Futbolo Akademija before signing for Lithuanian side FC Vilniaus Vytis in 2020. Ahead of the 2021 season, he returned to Lithuanian side FK Riteriai, where he made forty-four league appearances and scored six goals.

Following his stint there, he signed for Lithuanian side FK Kauno Žalgiris in 2023, where he made fifty-six league appearances and scored six goals. Subsequently, he signed for Czech side SK Sigma Olomouc in 2025, helping the club win the 2024–25 Czech Cup. Czech news website 90 minut wrote in 2025 that he "quickly adapted to Sigma Olomouc and gradually became a solid member of the starting lineup" while playing for the club.

== International career ==
Dolžnikov is a Lithuania international. During 2025, he played for the Lithuania national football team for 2026 FIFA World Cup qualification.

=== International goals ===
As of match played 24 September 2026

List of international goals scored by Artūr Dolžnikov
No.	Date	Venue	Opponent	Score	Result	Competition
1.	24 September 2026	Rheinpark Stadion, Vaduz, Liechtenstein	Liechtenstein	2–0	2–0	2026–27 UEFA Nations League D

== Style of play ==
Dolžnikov plays as a winger or forward. Right-footed, he is known for his set piece-taking ability.
