= 1939–40 Latvian Higher League =

Latvian football league season for the highest division

Latvian Higher League
- Season: 1939–40
- Champions: RFK; 5th Virsliga title 8th Latvian title
- Relegated: RKSB
- Goals scored: 235
- Average goals/game: 4.27
- Top goalscorer: Fricis Kaņeps (15); Aleksandrs Vanags (15)
- Biggest win: RFK 11-0 RKSB
- Highest scoring: ASK 9-2 VEF (11 goals); RFK 11-0 RKSB (11 goals)

The 1939–40 football season was the 13th season of the Latvian Virsliga. It was also the last season of football in independent Latvia before its annexation by the Soviet Union (the last matches of the season were played with Latvia already being part of the USSR).

== Competition modus ==
Every team played two games against each other team, one at home and one away. Teams received two points for a win and one point for a draw.

== Team changes to 1938-39 ==
16.JAPSK were relegated to Zemgale league after losing additional matches for the 6-8th places in the previous Virsliga season against US and Hakoah Riga. They were replaced by the winner of the promotion battles VEF Riga who beat out Venstpils Spars in the decisive match for a Virsliga berth.

== Season overview ==
The battle for the title was mostly between the defending champions Olimpija Liepāja and the former champions RFK. Until midseason Hakoah Riga also kept up in the race but it fell back later in the season. Olimpija squad suffered a serious loss when five of its footballers were disqualified because of problems with discipline by the club for a longer period. Those included leading players like Roberts Heiblihs, Pēteris Jurčenko and Fricis Laumanis. Eventually the disqualification of Laumanis was shortened but both Jurčenko and Heiblihs missed out nearly the entire season. In their absence the young forward from Kuldīga Bērziņš became the club's leading goalscorer.

== Final classification ==
Pos	Team	Pld	W	D	L	GF	GA	GD	Pts
1	Rīgas FK (C)	14	10	3	1	40	11	+29	23
2	Olimpija Liepāja	14	9	3	2	42	21	+21	21
3	ASK	14	6	4	4	40	26	+14	16
4	Hakoah Riga	14	7	1	6	21	25	−4	15
5	Rīgas Vilki	14	5	2	7	29	26	+3	12
6	VEF	14	3	4	7	26	39	−13	10
7	US	14	2	4	8	20	38	−18	8
8	RKSB	14	2	3	9	17	49	−32	7

(C) Champions

== Top goalscorers ==
15 goals

- (Latvia) Fricis Kaņeps (RFK)
- (Latvia) Aleksandrs Vanags (ASK)

13 goals

- (Latvia) Vaclavs Borduško (ASK)

12 goals

- (Latvia) J.Bērziņš (Olimpija Liepāja)

10 goals

- (Latvia) Edgars Klāvs (US)
- (Latvia) Ēriks Raisters (RFK)

9 goals

- (Latvia) Zamuels Garbers (Hakoah)

8 goals

- (Latvia) Jānis Rozītis (VEF)
- (Latvia) Voldemārs Apsēns (Olimpija Liepāja)

7 goals

- (Latvia) Ernests Ziņģis (Olimpija Liepāja)

== Champion squad ==
1.	RFK
	Goalkeepers: Herberts Briedis (12); Voldemārs Liepiņš (2). Field players: Pēteris Lauks (14); Ēriks Raisters (14 / 10); Fricis Kaņeps (14 / 15); Jānis Lidmanis (13); Francis Krupšs (12 / 3); Leons Freimanis (11 / 2); Ernests Volgasts (11 / 1); Sergejs Maģers (8); Kārlis Upenieks (7 / 5); Vadims Ulbergs (7); Aleksandrs Rehtšprehers (6 / 2); Jānis Dobelis (6 / 1); Roberts Prūsis (6); Oskars Rusmanis (6); Ēriks Pētersons (4); Alfrēds Blūms (1). (league appearances and goals listed in brackets)

== References and sources ==
- Latvijas futbola vēsture by Miķelis Rubenis, Rīga, 2001
