= Vadims Ulbergs =

Latvian footballer and manager

Vadims Ulbergs (17 July 1921 – 11 July 2008) was a Latvian football player and manager, one of the most respected veterans of Latvian football.

== Biography ==
His first choice in sports was basketball but soon he joined the most popular pre-war Latvian football club - Rīgas FK. First he played with the junior squad but aged just 17 he made his debut in Virslīga. At that time RFK had a very strong squad which included Latvia national team players Ēriks Pētersons, Sergejs Maģers, Fricis Kaņeps and others. Thus Ulbergs usually got to play only if some of the main squad players were injured.

With Rīgas FK Ulbergs stayed until 1942, then in order not to be called into German army, he took up work on the railroad and joined the newly founded football club Daugavieši. In 1944 Ulbergs was arrested because of a remark that one of his friends had made in a restaurant during Ēriks Pētersons birthday party about Adolf Hitler. Some time later he managed to escape and awaited the end of the war hiding in the woods.

After the war Ulbergs joined the FK Dinamo Rīga but because of an injury he soon switched from playing to coaching. For many years he worked in the Daugava sports school, but in the 1960s he was offered to work with FK Daugava Rīga senior squad. In different positions (both coaching and managing) Ulbergs worked with Daugava until the collapse of the club in early 1990s. Later he was an assistant of Jānis Gilis in the Latvia national football team.
