= Gints Gilis =

Latvian footballer

Personal information
- Date of birth: 7 November 1970 (age 55)
- Position: Midfielder

Senior career*
Years	Team	Apps	(Gls)
1988–1989	Zvejnieks Liepāja		
1989–1990	Daugava Riga		
1992	FK Pārdaugava		
1993	Motala AIF		
1995	Amstrig Rīga		
1996	RAF Jelgava		
1996–1997	Metalurgs Liepāja		

International career
1992–1993	Latvia	5	(0)
- * Club domestic league appearances and goals

Gints Gilis (born 7 November 1970) is a retired Latvian football midfielder.

He was a son of Jānis Gilis.
