= Magers =

Magers is a surname. Notable people with the surname include:

- Paul Magers (born 1954), American television news anchor
- Philomene Magers (born 1965), German art dealer
- Ron Magers (born 1944), American television journalist and news anchor
- Rose Magers (born 1960), American volleyball player
- Sergejs Maģers (1912–1989), Latvian footballer
