= Roberts Mežeckis =

Latvian footballer

Personal information
- Full name: Roberts Mežeckis
- Date of birth: 29 January 1981 (age 45)
- Place of birth: Riga, Latvian SSR, USSR (now Republic of Latvia)
- Height: 1.86 m (6 ft 1 in)
- Position: Defender

Team information
- Current team: Latvia U-21 (general manager)

Senior career*
Years	Team	Apps	(Gls)
2000	Policijas FK	7	(0)
2001	Skonto FC	0	(0)
2002	PFK/Daugava	9	(0)
2003–2008	FK Rīga	113	(21)
2008	Skonto FC	7	(1)
2009	Cork City FC	3	(0)

International career^{‡}
2009	Latvia	1	(0)
- * Club domestic league appearances and goals as of 5 January 2013 ‡ National team caps and goals as of 5 January 2013

Roberts Mežeckis (born 29 January 1981) is a retired Latvian professional footballer, currently the general manager and team coordinator of Latvia national under-21 football team.

== Career ==
Roberts Mežeckis was born in Riga, the son of the former Latvian Football Federation general manager Jānis Mežeckis.

He signed for Cork City FC from F.K. Riga at the start of the 2009 season. Unfortunately Roberts' first team chances that season were limited due to ongoing injury problems. After the players were told they were effectively free agents, Mezeckis left the club on 30 July 2009. In September 2009 he announced his retirement from professional football, due to his long-term tendon of Achilles injury.

== Post-football career ==
In 2012 Mežeckis was appointed as the general manager and team coordinator of Latvia national under-21 football team.
