= Daniels Nosegbe-Suško =

Latvian footballer (born 2004)

Personal information
- Date of birth: 14 September 2004 (age 22)
- Place of birth: London, England
- Height: 1.93 m (6 ft 4 in)
- Position: Centre-back

Team information
- Current team: FC Samtredia
- Number: 34

Youth career
- –2021: Skonto Academy
- 2021–2022: Rīgas Futbola skola
- 2022–2023: Napoli
- 2023–2024: Avellino

Senior career*
Years	Team	Apps	(Gls)
2023–2024	Avellino	0	(0)
2024	AFA Olaine	10	(1)
2025	FC Džiugas	18	(0)
2025–	FC Samtredia	14	(1)

International career^{‡}
2020–2022	Latvia U17	2	(1)
2022–2025	Latvia U19	8	(0)
2025–2026	Latvia U21	9	(0)
- * Club domestic league appearances and goals as of 29 November 2025 ‡ National team caps and goals as of 31 March 2026

Daniels Nosegbe-Suško (born 14 September 2004) is a professional footballer who plays as a centre-back for FC Samtredia. Born in England, he has represented Latvia at youth level.

== Club career ==
Nosegbe-Suško joined AFA Olaine in August 2024. He signed a contract with FC Džiugas on 21 February 2025. Nosegbe-Suško joined FC Samtredia on 13 July 2025.

== International career ==
Nosegbe-Suško played for Latvia's youth national teams in different age groups and now plays for Latvia U21.

== Personal life ==
Nosegbe-Suško was born and raised in London.
