= 1936 Baltic Cup =

International football competition

Tournament details
- Host country: Latvia
- Dates: 29–31 August
- Venue: 1 (in 1 host city)

Final positions
- Champions: Latvia (3rd title)
- Runners-up: Estonia
- Third place: Lithuania

Tournament statistics
- Matches played: 3
- Goals scored: 9 (3 per match)
- Attendance: 19,000 (6,333 per match)
- Top scorer: (Latvia) Alberts Šeibelis (2 goals)

The 1936 Baltic Cup was held in Riga, Latvia on 20–22 August 1935. It was the eighth time three Baltic states — Estonia, Latvia and Lithuania — came together to play a friendly tournament and determine the best team amongst them. Latvia won the tournament beating both opponents 2–1.

== Results ==
Team	Pld	W	D	L	GF	GA	GD	Pts
Latvia	2	2	0	0	4	2	+2	4
Estonia	2	1	0	1	3	3	0	2
Lithuania	2	0	0	2	2	4	–2	0

29 August 1936
16:30 (+2:00)

Latvia	2 – 1	Lithuania
Vestermans 75'; Šeibelis 90'	Report	27' Jaškevičius

JKS stadions, Riga
Attendance: 7,000
Referee: Rudolf Eklöw (Sweden)
30 August 1936
17:00 (+2:00)

Estonia	2 – 1	Lithuania
Siimenson 24'; Kuremaa 61'	Report	84' Gudelis

JKS stadions, Riga
Attendance: 2,000
Referee: Rudolf Eklöw (Sweden)
31 August 1936
17:30 (+2:00)

Latvia	2 – 1	Estonia
Šeibelis 35'; Lidmanis 41' (pen.)	Report	73' (pen.) Kaljo

JKS stadions, Riga
Attendance: 10,000
Referee: Rudolf Eklöw (Sweden)

1936 Baltic Cup winner

Latvia
Third title

== Statistics ==
=== Goalscorers ===
There were 9 goals scored in 3 matches, for an average of 3 goals per match.

2 goals

- (Latvia) Alberts Šeibelis

1 goal

- (Estonia) Julius Kaljo
- (Estonia) Georg Siimenson
- (Estonia) Richard Kuremaa
- (Latvia) Jānis Lidmanis
- (Latvia) Iļja Vestermans
- (Lithuania) Voldemaras Jaškevičius
- (Lithuania) Juozas Gudelis
