= Iļja Ščaņicins =

Latvian association football player

Personal information
- Date of birth: 16 March 1984 (age 42)
- Place of birth: Riga, Latvian SSR
- Height: 1.83 m (6 ft 0 in)
- Position: Forward

Team information
- Current team: RFS

Youth career
- –2000: Skonto FC

Senior career*
Years	Team	Apps	(Gls)
2001	Skonto FC		
2002	FK Auda		
2003–2004	FC Hämeenlinna	14	(2)
2004	FK Rīga		
2005	JFK Olimps		
Total		14+	(2+)

International career
2002	Latvia U19	1	(0)
2004–2005	Latvia U21	6	(0)
- * Club domestic league appearances and goals

Iļja Ščaņicins (born 16 March 1984) is a Latvian retired footballer who played as a forward.
