= Aivars Drupass =

Latvian footballer

Personal information
- Full name: Aivars Drupass
- Date of birth: 3 August 1963
- Place of birth: Riga, Latvian SSR, Soviet Union
- Date of death: 1999 (aged 35–36)
- Height: 1.75 m (5 ft 9 in)
- Position: Forward

Senior career*
Years	Team	Apps	(Gls)
1982	FK Daugava Rīga	1	(0 49)
1984	SKA Khabarovsk	37	(8)
1985	CSKA Moscow	21	(1)
1986–1990	FK Daugava Rīga	177	(37)
1991	FC Karpaty Lviv	15	(4)
1992	FC Skonto	2	(0)

International career
1992	Latvia	4	(1)
- * Club domestic league appearances and goals

Aivars Drupass (1963–1999) was a Latvian football forward.

== Playing career ==
At the age of 18 the talented forward who was previously coached by Latvian footballer Gunārs Ulmanis joined FK Daugava Rīga. In his first season for Daugava he played in just one game. Since he had to join the army, for several years Drupass played in army clubs – SKA Khabarovsk and CSKA Moscow but in 1986 he was back in Daugava (6 goals in 33 matches). In 1992, he played 2 games for FC Skonto, the Latvian champion. Drupass also made 4 international appearances for Latvia (including in the first international match for Latvia after regaining of independence). He died from a serious illness at the age of just 36 years.

== Honours ==
- Latvian Champion (1):
  - 1992
