= Aleksandrs Basovs =

Latvian footballer (born 1977)

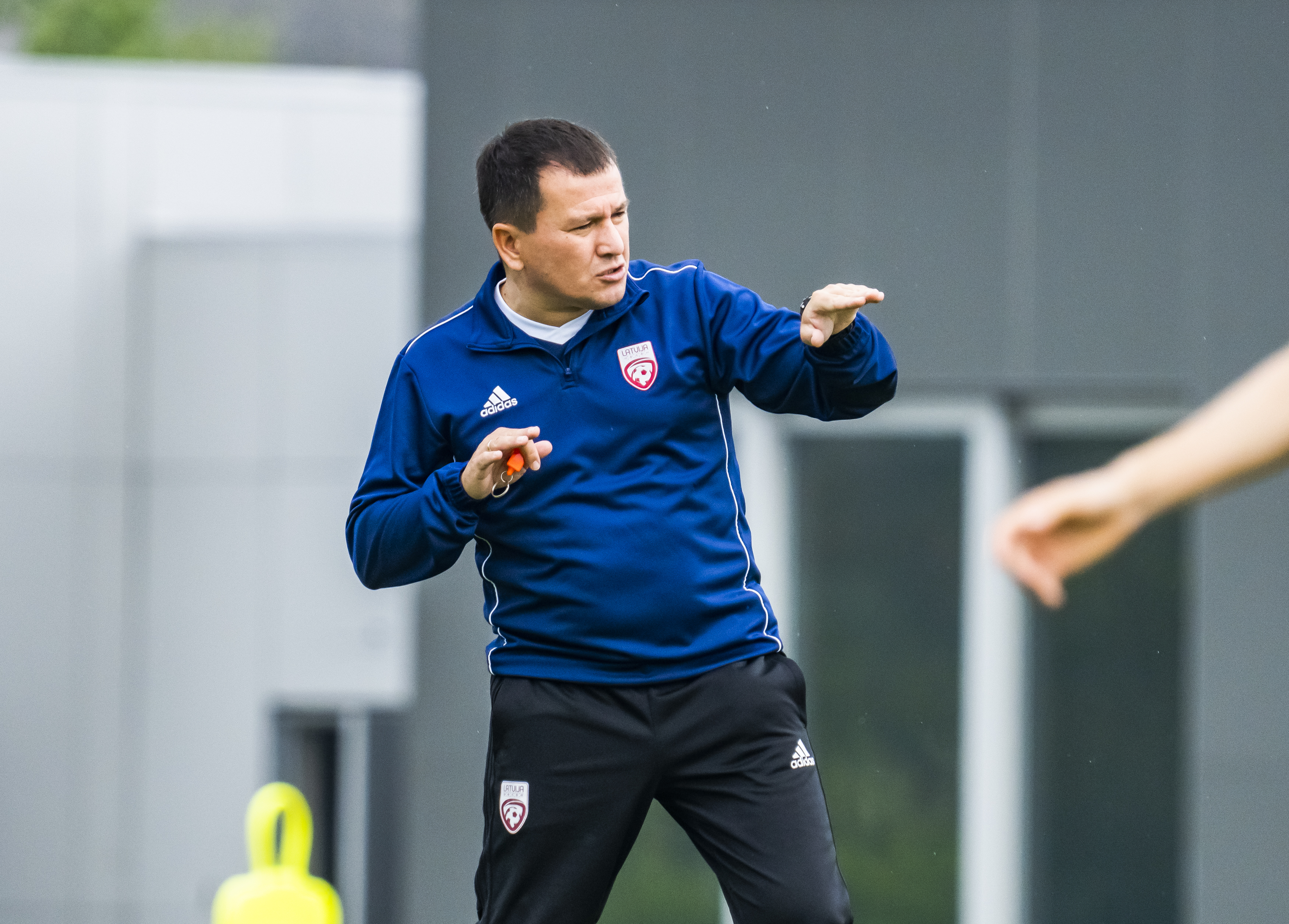

Personal information
- Date of birth: 24 October 1977 (age 49)
- Place of birth: Riga, Latvian SSR, Soviet Union

Team information
- Current team: FS Jelgava (manager)

Youth career
- 1985–1994: Rīgas Futbola skola

Senior career*
Years	Team	Apps	(Gls)
1993	FK Pārdaugava	1	(0)
1994	FK Kvadrāts		
1995–1996	ASK-Flaminko		

International career
1992-1993	Latvia U17	6	(0)
1995	Latvia U19	1	(0)

Managerial career
- 2000–2001: Rīgas Futbola skola (youth)
- 2002–2008: Skonto FC (youth)
- 2008–2011: Lokomotiv Moscow (youth)
- 2012–2015: Strogino Moscow (youth)
- 2013: Strogino Moscow
- 2015: Super Nova (youth)
- 2016–2018: Latvia U19
- 2019-2020: Latvia U17/U16
- 2020–2024: Latvia U21
- 2024–: FS Jelgava
- * Club domestic league appearances and goals

Aleksandrs Basovs (born 24 October 1977) is a Latvian professional football manager and former player who is currently in charge of Latvian Higher League club FS Jelgava.

== Playing career ==
Aleksandrs Basovs started his first football training at the Riga Football School. At the age of 15, he made his debut in the 1993 Latvian Higher League season as part of FK Pārdaugava against FK Auseklis, coming on as a substitute in the 88th minute. It was the only game at the highest level as a player, as a cruciate ligament rupture ended his football career. Until then, he was also a player for the U-17 and U-19 national teams.

== Coaching career ==
After ending his playing career prematurely, he began working as a youth coach in Latvia and Russia. While coaching in both Russia and Latvia, Basovs helped various teams achieve victories in different tournaments. In 2015, he returned to Latvia at the invitation of the Latvian Football Federation to lead the Latvian youth national teams. He holds a UEFA PRO license, the highest-level coaching certificate in UEFA member states, allowing him to coach top-division football clubs in any European country and participate in UEFA club and international competitions. In the 2017–18 season, he reached the Elite Round with the U-19 national team, finishing in 10th place.

== Honors ==
Latvia U19

- Baltic U-19 Cup: 2016, 2018

Latvia U21

- Baltic U-21 Cup: 2022, 2024
