= Dainis Kazakevičs =

Latvian footballer and manager

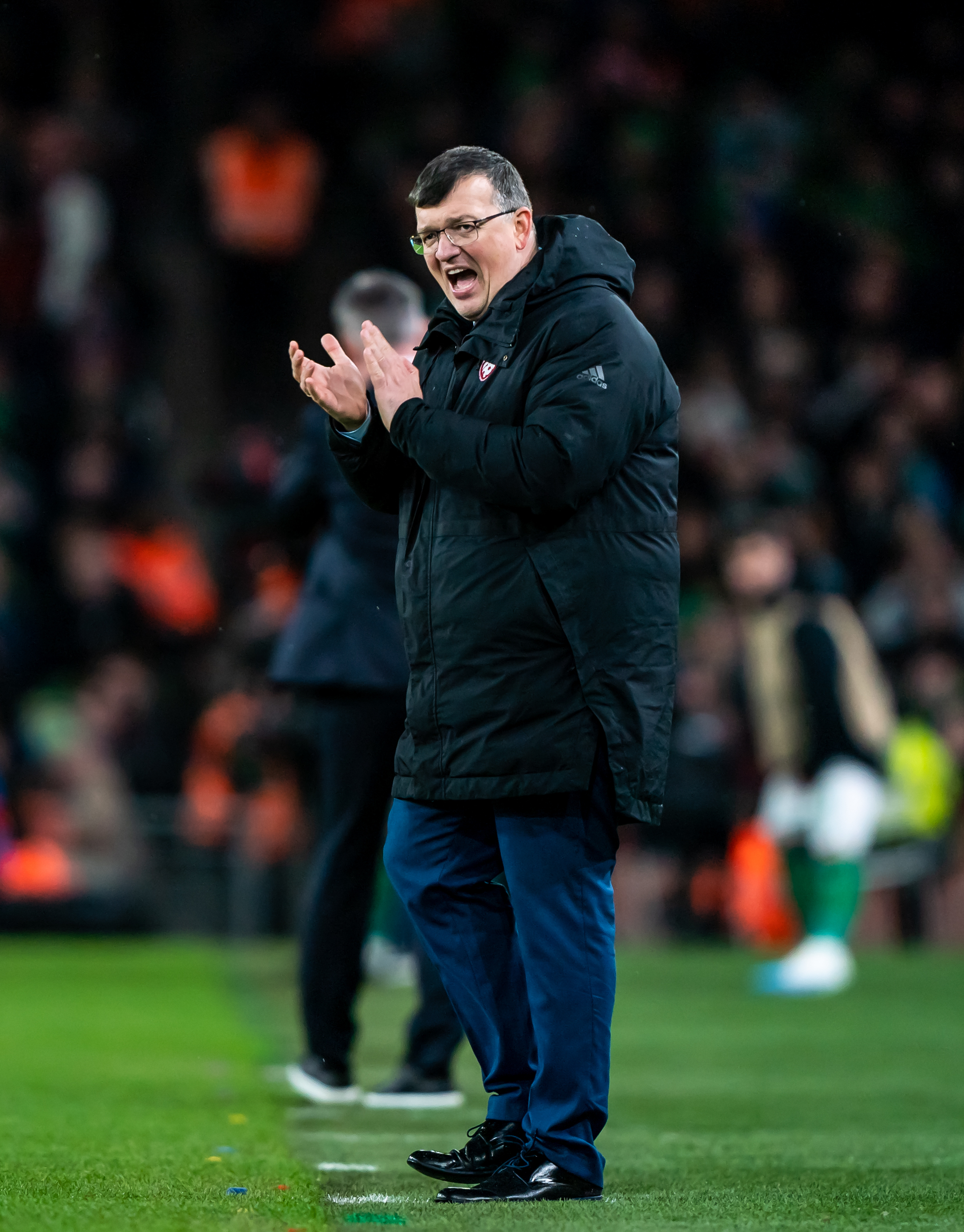
- Kazakevičs managing Latvia in 2023

Personal information
- Date of birth: 30 March 1981 (age 45)
- Place of birth: Bauska, Latvian SSR, Soviet Union

Youth career
- Jelgavas BJSS

Senior career*
Years	Team	Apps	(Gls)
- Dialogs

Managerial career
- 2001–2003: Viola
- 2004–2012: Jelgava
- 2013–2020: Latvia U21
- 2020–2023: Latvia
- 2024–2025: FA Šiauliai
- * Club domestic league appearances and goals

Dainis Kazakevičs (born 30 March 1981) is a Latvian professional football manager.

== Club career ==
Kazakevičs began his career in the youth team of Jelgavas BJSS, later representing Jelgava-based club Dialogs in the 1995 edition of the Latvian First League.

== Managerial career ==
Following his playing career, Kazakevičs moved into coaching, coaching Viola's second team. In 2001, Kazakevičs was appointed head coach of Viola. Kazakevičs held the post until the club's demise in 2003, when they merged with RAF Jelgava to form FK Jelgava. Kazakevičs remained manager of the newly formed club. In 2009, Kazakevičs won the Latvian First League, guiding the club to the Latvian Football Cup a year later. In 2013, following his departure from Jelgava, Kazakevičs was appointed Latvia's under-21 manager. Kazakevičs remained in the post for seven years. On 20 January 2020, Kazakevičs was confirmed as Slaviša Stojanovič's successor as manager of Latvia. On December 7, Dainis Kazakevics lost his position as the head coach of the Latvian national football team following a board decision. Since the beginning of 2020, when Dainis Kazakevics started leading the national team, he had to contend with critics from the outset, as his appointment to the position raised immediate questions. Criticism of Kazakevics persisted thereafter, and skepticism did not completely disappear even during the series of five victories in 2022. However, the call for DainisOut reached its zenith in 2023 - that year saw ten games with nine losses, and notably, since the beginning of September, only two goals were scored in six matches (all scored in the victory over Armenia, during which the fan sector demonstratively left the stands in the first half, demanding the coach's resignation). The pressure from the public did not diminish afterwards, culminating in the termination of his contract.

== Managerial statistics ==
As of match played 21 November 2023

Team	From	To	Record				
Team	From	To	G	W	D	L	Win %
Latvia U-21	14 August 2013	December 2019	63	13	19	31	20.63
Latvia	20 January 2020	7 December 2023	41	11	12	18	26.83
