= Ferenc Voggenhuber =

Hungarian football manager (1894–1942)

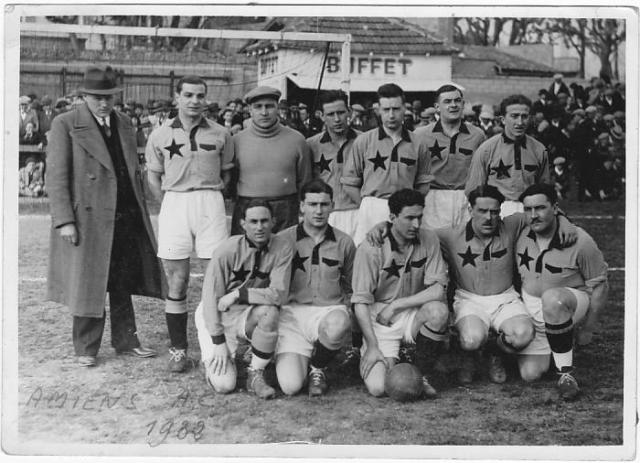
- Voggenhuber (standing, first from left) in February 1932

Personal information
- Full name: Ferenc István Voggenhuber
- Date of birth: 1 July 1894
- Place of birth: Budapest, Hungary
- Date of death: 16 January 1942 (aged 47)
- Place of death: Budapest, Hungary

Senior career*
Years	Team	Apps	(Gls)
1910–1914	Budapesti EAC		

Managerial career
- 1922–1924: Tallinna JK
- 1924: Turul SE
- 1924–1925: Szombathelyi AK
- 1925: Império Lisboa Clube
- 1925: Vitória Setúbal
- 1925–1926: União da Madeira
- 1926: Marino FC
- 1927: Kecskemét FC
- 1927–1928: Apollon Smyrnis
- 1928: Marino FC
- 08/1928–10/1928: Deportivo de La Coruña
- 1928–1929: Asturias
- 1929: Merkur FC
- 1929–1930: Maccabi Kraków
- 1930–1933: Amiens
- 01/1933–09/1933: US Saint-Malo
- 1933–1934: CAL Oran
- 1934–1935: US Tourquennoise
- 1935: Cluj-Napoca team
- 1935: Latvia
- * Club domestic league appearances and goals

Ferenc István Voggenhuber (1 July 1894 – 16 January 1942) was a Hungarian football manager who took charge of several clubs all over the world, including in Hungary, Estonia, Portugal, Spain, Romania, Greece, Mexico, Poland, France, Algeria, Latvia, and even China. Notably, he oversaw the Latvian national team in 1935, and also helped prepare the national teams of Romania and Poland for a match in 1926 and 1930, respectively.

== Early life ==
Born in Budapest on 1 July 1894, Voggenhuber began his sports career at his hometown club Budapesti EAC, where he practiced both football and athletics until the outbreak of the First World War.

== Managerial career ==
=== Early career ===
Voggenhuber began his coaching career in Estonia in 1922, when the 28-year-old Voggenhuber took over the newly founded Tallinna JK, which thus became the first football club in Estonia to have a foreign coach. He held this position for two years, until March 1924, when he became the professional coach of Turul SE in Kaposvár, but two months later, in May 1924, he was signed by Szombathelyi AK, which at the time was region's most high-quality club.

=== Portugal ===
In his first season at the club (1924–25), SzAK toured Portugal at the turn of the year, and the locals enjoyed his team's playing style so much that he was signed by one of their lower division teams, Império Lisboa Clube (currently known as C.D. Palhavã). During his time in Império, he was also asked to manage the Lisbon football team, which he led to victories over Porto by five goals both at home and away. In early March 1925, the Portuguese invited him, along with two other Hungarian coaches based in Lisbon, Gyula Lelovich and Ferenc Ekker, to dinner after the match between the military teams from Madrid and Lisbon.

Voggenhuber then joined Vitória Setúbal, where he lasted only a few months, as he then decided to visit some islands, first Madeira, where he took over União da Madeira in the autumn of 1925, and also gave lessons of Swedish gymnastics in the local spa and sanatorium, and then the Canary Islands, where he took over Marino FC in June 1926. While in Madeira, in January 1926, Voggenhuber and Szabó helped organize a tour of Madeira by SzAK, who played six matches there for a total score of 30–5, including a 7–0 win over Marítimo and even against local English colony team. Knowing the local conditions, he told SzAK in advance that the referees from Madeira were notorious for awarding penalties, so an English referee was chosen instead.

In the end, however, he quickly got bored of islands too, as he then returned to continental Europe, this time to Romania, where he coached the Romanian national team in the 1926 King Alexander's Cup against Yugoslavia in Zagreb on 3 October 1926, which ended in a 2–3 victory.

=== Success in Greece and the Canary Islands ===
A few months later, in March 1927, Voggenhuber returned to his homeland, this time as the coach of Kecskemét FC, which withdrew from the 1927–28 second division championship after going bankrupt during its tour of Bulgaria, so he decided to remain in the Balkans, signing for Apollon Smyrnis in Greece, where he finally achieved something as he led the team to a triumph in the 1928 Athens championship, but the taste of victory proved insufficient to stop his wandering lifestyle, as he then returned to Spain to rejoin Marino. On the day of his arrival, Marino won the local cup, and a few weeks later, it won a cup that was also contested by clubs from Las Palmas, with Marino beating Real Club Victoria 2–1 in the final on 12 June 1928. Two months later, in early August, he took over Deportivo de La Coruña, and two months after that, on 30 November, he was already leaving the club, this time to join Asturias in Mexico, then engulfed in turmoil, but the local press highlighted that "Voggenhuber must have gotten used to this by now, as he had experienced about twenty revolutions in Greece and Portugal". He vowed to "work as a devoted pioneer of Hungarian football culture on the other side of the Atlantic Ocean", but his work there only lasted until the following summer, when he returned to his homeland under the pretext that he "could not physically handle the 2,700-meter high air".

In Hungary, Voggenhuber took over Merkur FC, which withdrew from the 1929–30 second division championship due to financial struggles, so he then went to Poland, to take charge of Maccabi Kraków, which also ran into financial struggles, thus becoming unable to continue paying him. Whilst there, he took a job with the local FA, and even helped preparing the Polish national team for a match. At that point, the Hungarian sports press had already nicknamed him "The World Traveler".

=== Amiens ===
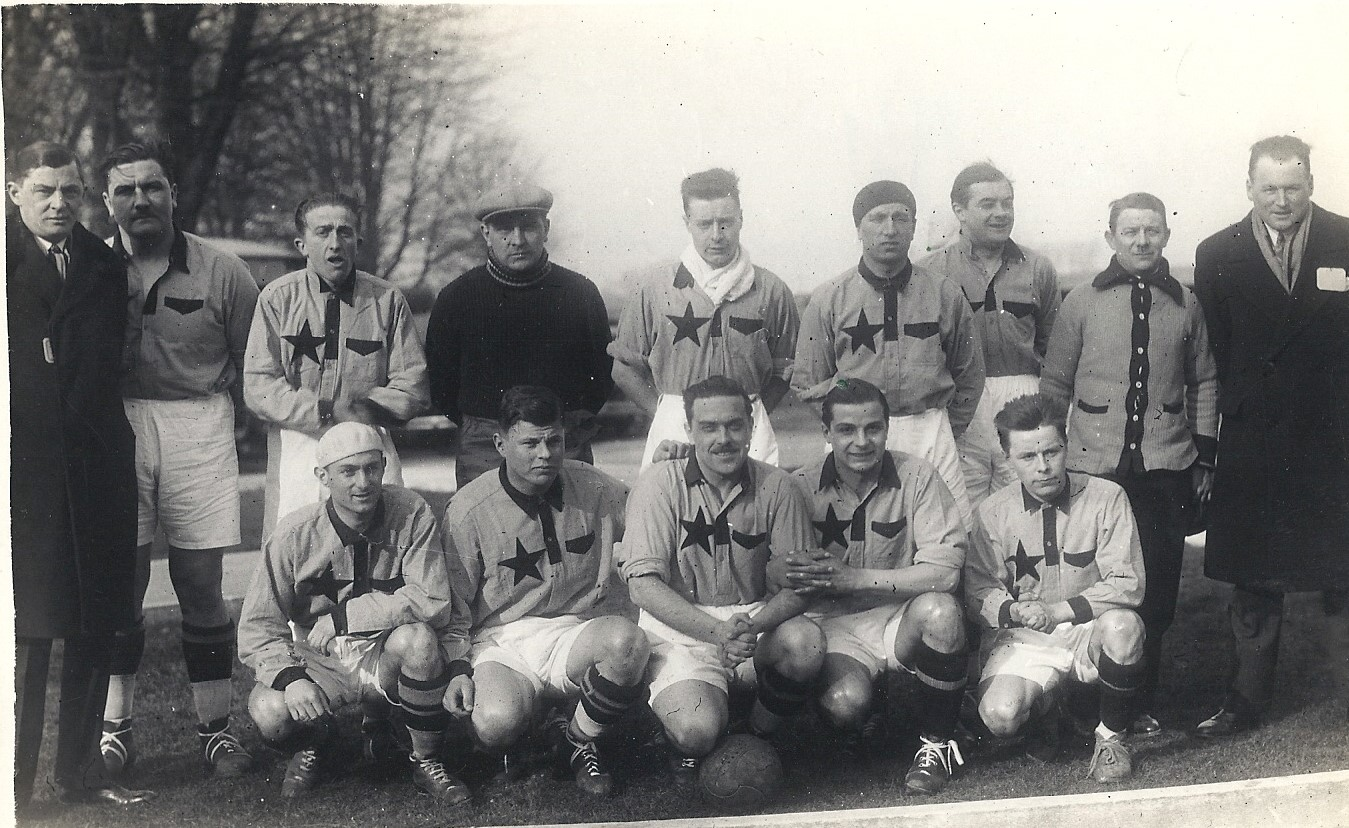
Voggenhuber (standing, first from left) with the Amiens team in 1931.

In May 1930, Voggenhuber, who was no longer being paid by Maccabi, accepted a lucrative offer from Amiens, arriving there in August 1930. (Note: Some French sources wrongly call him "François de Woggenhuber" and erroneously state that he is Austrian.) At the time, Northern France was considered a tough place for foreign coaches, as the Austrian Robert Fischer and the English Charlie Williams had not last more than a month there; somehow, however, this turned out to be the place where Voggenhuber remained the longest time: almost two and a half years. Initially, Amiens appointed him as assistant coach to Maurice Thédié, who was removed at the end of 1930 because of his criticisms of the Hungarian. Voggenhuber was a coach who needed to establish a routine in order to produce successful work, so he began holding training sessions on weekdays, which was not fashionable at the time, but with thousands of tricks, he finally managed to lure them onto the field, and they soon paid off. Under his leadership, Amiens became the best team in France in terms of goal difference, with the first team beating RC Calais 18–2, thus setting a French league record, while the reserves scored a total of 170 goals, winning their last two games 20–1 and 19–1, and the youth team usually was 5-6 goals better than their opponents. Therefore, both the reserve and youth teams became district champions within his first year there, after which Amiens extended his contract and increased his salary by fifty percent.

Amiens' consistent success allowed many of its players to reach the French national team, setting a club record in a friendly match against Czechoslovakia on 15 February 1931, when three Amiens players were selected for France: Paul Nicolas as captain, Célestin Delmer as player, and Ernest Libérati as a reserve. After a heavy 5–0 loss to Italy in Bologna, the FFF decided to try out a coach from the then existing pool of Hungarian professionals working in France, FC Rouen's Zoltán Vágó, Club Français' Fischer, and Amiens' Voggenhuber, and even though the French demanded the latter, the federation ultimately did not agree to it, which caused five Amiens players to cancel their participation in the national team. During his time in Amiens, he organized several tours of France for Hungarian teams, such as Miskolci AK in April 1931, even offering a cup to the winner.

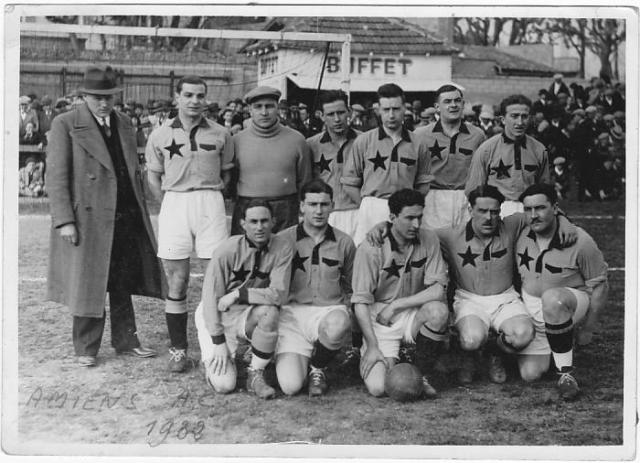
Voggenhuber (standing, first from left) with the Amiens team in February 1932.

His second season at the club was less successful, probably because of his many travels, driving 1,200 kilometers to visit the Kispest touring France at Christmas 1931, accompanying the Szombathely touring team in France in early 1932, and accompanying the Ferencváros team from Marseille to Morocco for a Christmas 1932 tour. Despite this, Amiens managed to reach the round of 16 of the 1931–32 Coupe de France after knocking the defending champions Montpellier 3–2 in the previous round. Whilst in Amiens, his younger brother Oszkár, a newspaper writer who later became the house pianist of Ferencvárosi TC, broke his hand, so he decided to follow Franz's footsteps and travel to France to coach; even though he had no qualification to do so, he was able to take over a small second division team, Lorient Sport, which became district champion in the 1931–32 season, and even surprisingly defeated the touring Kispest in March 1932. Like his brother, he was also a newspaper writer, regularly reporting on his many adventures for the Hungaria newspaper Nemzeti Sport; in January 1932, for instance, he wrote a letter about Kispest's victory over Olympique de Marseille.

=== Later career ===
In early 1933, Voggenhuber was hired as a coach and sports director by US Saint-Malo in Brittany, which was going to be one of the 23 teams in the inaugural edition of French Division 2, so he visited Hungary in July to recruit some players to strengthen the club for such an occasion, bringing four back with him. At the start of the season, Malo faced his former club Amiens, who was playing its first professional home match and who 5–2. Unlike in Amiens, however, Voggenhuber was not able to control his nomad urges, leaving Malo a few weeks later, and in October 1933, after a short detour in Paris, he moved to Africa, where he signed a lucrative contract with the first division club CAL Oran, thanks to the mediation of the secretary of the French federation. In the summer of 1934, he returned to France, specifically to Tourcoing, where he took over the professional second-division team US Tourquennoise, bringing some players from Africa with him, including a big-boned Negro right-winger that he thought would "make a big impression".

As expected, Voggenhuber left Tourcoing after only one season, going to Romania again, but after being harrowed by a team from Cluj-Napoca in mid-May 1935, he took a train to Riga, Latvia, where he spent a few months as the national team's coach, a position that he held for five months, from late May until mid-October 1935. In total, he coached Latvia in nine matches, seven friendly matches, and two in the 1935 Baltic Cup, winning only one, drawing five, and losing three.

In the late 1930s, Voggenhuber began spending less and less time abroad and more and more time at home, but he still made one last big trip in 1937, this time going to China, but his role there failed due to the increasingly threatening outbreak of the Second Sino-Japanese War in July. At some point, he also visited Finland.

== Death ==
On the afternoon of 16 January 1942, the 47-year-old Voggenhuber fell ill at a café table with a group of friends and was taken to the Szent István Hospital, where he died.

== Honours ==
Apollon Smyrnis

- Athens championship:
  - Champions (1): 1924

Latvia

- Baltic Cup
  - Runner-up (1): 1935

== See also ==
- List of Deportivo de La Coruña managers
