= Jānis Gilis =

Soviet footballer

Personal information
- Date of birth: 27 April 1943
- Place of birth: Soviet Union
- Date of death: 13 September 2000 (aged 57)
- Position: Midfielder

Senior career*
Years	Team	Apps	(Gls)
1964	ASK Riga		
1965–1968	FK Daugava Rīga		
1969	FK Lielupe		

Managerial career
- 1969–197?: FK Lielupe
- 197?–1979: FK Daugava Rīga (assistant)
- 1983–1989: Rīga school of football
- 1990–1991: FK Pārdaugava reserve
- 1991–1997: Latvia
- 1996–1997: FHK Liepājas Metalurgs
- 1999: FK Rīga
- * Club domestic league appearances and goals

Jānis Gilis (27 April 1943 – 13 September 2000), was the general manager of Latvia national football team after Latvia regained independence.

== Playing career ==
His first senior team was ASK Riga. From 1965 to 1968 Gilis played in the strongest Latvian team - FK Daugava Rīga, after a conflict with the team manager he left the team for Zvejnieks Liepāja. The 1969 season Gilis started as a player in FK Lielupe but soon he got an offer to become a manager for Lielupe thus ending his playing career.

== Coaching career ==
FK Lielupe were his first team as a manager. Later from 1977 to 1979, he was an assisting manager for FK Daugava under Vadims Ulbergs (), worked as a coach in the Riga school of football, and manager of FK Pārdaugava reserves squad. After Latvian independence in 1991, Gilis was appointed as the first general manager of the Latvia national football team. Their first match under his management for Latvia was played on 8 April 1992 against Romania (0:1). Under Gilis Latvia participated in qualifying for two FIFA World Cups and one European championship. The first years for the national team were tough although under Gilis Latvia got some notable wins (1:0 against Northern Ireland, 3:2 against Austria) and also a couple of historical draws (0:0 against Spain and European champions Denmark). Gilis' son Gints Gilis had 5 caps for Latvia under his father. After the work with the national team Gilis managed Liepājas Metalurgs but in 1999 - FK Rīga which under Gilis won the Latvian Cup in the first year of the club existing. Gilis died on 13 September 2000.

== Honours ==
- Baltic Cup
  - 1993
