= Ēriks Raisters =

Latvian footballer

Personal information
- Date of birth: 6 November 1913
- Place of birth: Riga, Russian Empire
- Date of death: 25 May 1942 (aged 28)
- Place of death: Gorokhovetsky District, Vladimir Oblast, Russia
- Position: Forward

Senior career*
Years	Team	Apps	(Gls)
1931–1933	JKS Riga		
1934–1940	RFK Riga		
1941	Dinamo Minsk	6	(0)

International career
1934–1940	Latvia	27	(6)
- * Club domestic league appearances and goals

Ēriks Raisters (26 November 1913 – 25 May 1942) was a Latvian footballer who played as a forward. He made 27 international appearances for the Latvia national team between 1934 and 1940.

== Club career ==
Raisters' first senior club was JKS Riga, a club known for raising young players who then left for bigger and stronger sides. Raisters joined the side in 1931 and in his first year the club earned promotion back to the Latvian Higher League (Virsliga). Raisters played two more years for JKS and it finished 5th in the league in both years. However, before the 1934 season he joined the most successful Latvian club - RFK Riga for which he played until 1940. Over the years he played with RFK Raisters, won three Latvian league titles and the Latvian Cup two times (in 1937 and 1939).

After Latvia was taken over by the Soviet Union and the former's sports clubs were disbanded Raisters was selected to play for FK Dinamo Riga in 1940. The next year he played for Belarusian team Dynamo Minsk.

== International career ==
Raisters made his international début for Latvia on 10 June 1934 in a friendly match against Lithuania in Kaunas, the only match he played for the national team in 1934. He became a regular in the national team in 1935. In his second match for Latvia (against Lithuania once again) on 30 May 1935 Raisters scored his first goal for the country. In total he played four matches for Latvia in 1935, two in 1936, eight in 1937, eight in 1938, three in 1939 and one in 1940 - in the last international match for Latvia before 1992. With 27 appearances (and six scored goals) for the Latvia, Raisters was the 11th most capped footballer in the pre-war country.

== Personal life and death ==
Raisters was born in Riga, son of accountant Ernest Raisters and his handcraft teacher wife Berta Antonija (nee Rubene). He was educated at Riga 1st Gymnasium, graduating in 1933.

In early 1941, he was arrested and tried for a dispute with a Soviet official and sentenced to 9 years imprisonment or being directed to play for Dynamo Minsk. Later in 1941 he was drafted into the Red Army and died during the Second World War from pneumonia in camp at Gorohovica, Gorokhovetsky District in Russia on 25 May 1942. He was buried in the village of Zalino.

== Honours ==
=== Club ===
- Latvian Higher League: 1934, 1935, 1940 (RFK Riga)
- Latvian Cup: 1937, 1939

=== International ===
- Baltic Cup: 1936, 1937
