= Latvia national football team =

Men's association football team

Latvia
- Nickname(s): 11 vilki (11 Wolves)
- Association: Latvijas Futbola Federācija (LFF)
- Confederation: UEFA (Europe)
- Head coach: Vacant
- Captain: Antonijs Černomordijs
- Most caps: Vitālijs Astafjevs (167)
- Top scorer: Māris Verpakovskis (29)
- Home stadium: Skonto Stadium; Daugava Stadium (rare matches)
- FIFA code: LVA
First colours	Second colours	Third colours

FIFA ranking
- Current: 145 ▼2 (18 November 2026)
- Highest: 45 (November 2009)
- Lowest: 148 (September 2017)

First international
- Latvia 1–1 Estonia (Riga, Latvia; 24 September 1922)

Biggest win
- Latvia 6–1 Lithuania (Riga, Latvia; 30 May 1935); Latvia 5–0 Lithuania (Võru, Estonia; 1 June 2012); Gibraltar 0–5 Latvia (Gibraltar; 29 March 2016); Andorra 0–5 Latvia (Andorra la Vella, Andorra; 17 November 2020)

Biggest defeat
- Sweden 12–0 Latvia (Stockholm, Sweden; 29 May 1927)

European Championship
- Appearances: 1 (first in 2004)
- Best result: Group stage (2004)

Baltic Cup
- Appearances: 29 (first in 1928)
- Best result: Champions (1928, 1932, 1936, 1937, 1993, 1995, 2001, 2003, 2008, 2012, 2014, 2016, 2018)

The Latvia national football team (Latvian: Latvijas futbola izlase) represents Latvia in men's international football and is governed by the Latvian Football Federation (LFF), the sport's official governing body in the country.

The team played its first official international match in 1922, a 1–1 draw against Estonia, and joined FIFA later that same year. In 1924, Latvia made its Olympic debut by participating in the Summer Games in Paris, and was an active participant in early international football. The team came close to qualifying for the 1938 FIFA World Cup, but political events soon altered its course.

Following the Soviet occupation and annexation of Latvia during World War II, the national team disappeared from the international stage for over 50 years. Football development in Latvia was largely constrained under the Soviet system, where local players could only compete as part of the Latvian SSR in inter-republic tournaments or under the flag of the USSR, limiting the country's independent footballing identity and progress. After regaining independence in 1991, Latvia resumed international competition and achieved its greatest success in 2004, when the team qualified for the UEFA European Championship under head coach Aleksandrs Starkovs — the nation’s only major tournament appearance to date. Latvia came close to reaching the FIFA World Cup on several occasions, most notably during the 2010 qualification campaign, when the team finished just three points behind a playoff spot. The team regularly competes in the Baltic Cup, a sub-regional tournament between Latvia, Lithuania, and Estonia. Latvia holds the record for the most tournament victories, with 13 titles, most recently in 2018. Home matches are primarily played at Skonto Stadium in Riga, although Daugava Stadium is also used for select fixtures, particularly those requiring greater capacity.

== History ==
=== Early years ===
The Latvia national football team played their first official match on 24 September 1922, against Estonia, resulting in a 1–1 draw. The first goal in the team's history was scored by forward Edvīns Bārda. In 1920, the Latvian Football Union (today - Latvijas Futbola federācija) was established, which led to the formation of the national team. Latvia participated in the Football at the 1924 Summer Olympics, but lost their only match 0–7 to France. The team's first victory came on 18 October 1924, against Estonia, winning 2–0.

In 1928, Latvia triumphed in the inaugural Baltic Cup, defeating the national teams of Lithuania and Estonia. During the 1920s, some of the standout players included goalkeeper Arvīds Jurgens and the Bārda brothers—Edvīns, Arvīds, and Rūdolfs—as well as Voldemārs Grāvelis, Arnolds Tauriņš, and Alberts Šeibelis.

The 1930s marked a period of growth for the Latvian national team, particularly between 1936 and 1938 under Austrian coach Rudolf Stanzl. Latvia frequently played friendly matches against teams such as Lithuania, Estonia, Finland, Sweden, and Poland. In 1937, Latvia participated in the 1938 FIFA World Cup qualification. Placed in Group 8 alongside Austria and Lithuania, Latvia achieved notable victories, beating Lithuania 4–2 in Riga, with a Fricis Kaņeps hat-trick and a goal from Iļja Vestermans. In Kaunas, they secured a 5–1 win with two goals each from Kaņeps, Vaclavs Borduško, and Iļja Vestermans. However, they lost 1–2 in a decisive away match against Austria, despite an early goal from Vestermans.

In April 1938, Austria's Anschluss rendered their team ineligible to participate in the FIFA World Cup. Despite Latvia being the group's runner-up, FIFA did not invite them to replace Austria.

Latvia played 99 official matches during the pre-war period from 1922 to 1940 and won the Baltic Cup 12 times. The last match of the pre-war Latvian national team was on 18 July 1940, against Estonia, ending in a 1–2 loss. The outbreak of World War II initially limited and eventually halted the team's activities entirely. During the German and Soviet occupations, the Latvian national team ceased to exist in its form during Latvia's independence.

The best players of the 1930s included Jānis Lidmanis, Ēriks Raisters, Jānis Rozītis, Fricis Kaņeps, Iļja Vestermans, and Aleksandrs Vanags. Ēriks Pētersons is considered the greatest Latvian footballer of the pre-war era, having scored 21 goals in 63 matches for the national team.

=== Latvian SSR national team during the Soviet era (1940–1991) ===
Latvian football's evident growth was abruptly halted and devastated when, in 1940, Latvia was occupied and annexed by the Soviet Union. The largest internal sports event in the Soviet Union was the Spartakiad of the Peoples of the USSR. Football was included in some editions, featuring teams representing the Soviet republics, as well as Moscow and Leningrad. In the 1956 Spartakiad, Latvia was represented by FC Daugava Riga. The team played four matches, securing three victories and suffering one defeat, with a goal difference of 10–7.

Football returned to the Spartakiad program only in 1979, and once again, Latvia was represented by FC Daugava Riga. However, the results were poor, with one victory and five losses, and a goal difference of 10–16. In subsequent Spartakiads, youth teams (under 20 years old) participated instead.

During the Soviet occupation, the Latvian SSR national football team continued to compete in the Baltic Cup — a tournament first held in 1928 — until 1976.

=== The Early Years of the Restored Latvian National Team (1992–1997) ===
The country regained its independence in 1991, before, in 1990, the Latvian Football Federation (LFF) was reestablished, and Latvia rejoined FIFA shortly after regaining independence. However, the Latvian national football team had to be built from scratch. In December 1991, during an LFF executive committee meeting, Jānis Gilis was appointed as the first head coach of the restored national team. It was decided that the position of national team head coach was of such importance that it should not be combined with any club coaching roles. Gilis committed to focusing entirely on the national team, stepping down from his role with FK Pārdaugava's youth team. His competitor for the position, Marks Zahodins, expressed willingness to support Gilis as an assistant coach if needed.

Following his appointment, Gilis emphasized the challenge of assembling a team from scratch, meeting with potential players, and ensuring that those selected prioritized national pride above all else. The experimental team fielded in the autumn of 1991 was put together hastily, even lacking proper kits initially. Offers from international suppliers soon resolved this issue, and Gilis selected Vadims Ulbergs and Vladimirs Beškarevs as his assistants.

Latvia's first victory came on 10 July 1992, with a 2–1 win over Estonia, thanks to two goals by Ainārs Linards. Later that summer, Latvia began its campaign in the 1994 FIFA World Cup qualification tournament. The team achieved historic draws against Spain (0–0) and reigning Euro 1992 winners Denmark (0–0) but suffered heavy defeats to Spain (0–5) and Ireland (0–4). With five draws and five points, Latvia finished 6th out of 7 teams in their group. Key players during this period included former Riga "Daugava" stars such as Jurijs Popkovs, Jurijs Ševļakovs, Oļegs Aleksejenko, Ainārs Linards, and Oļegs Karavajevs, as well as promising newcomers like Mihails Zemļinskis and Vitālijs Astafjevs.

In the qualification campaign for the 1996 UEFA European Championship, Latvia demonstrated increasing competitiveness, securing wins against Austria and Northern Ireland. The most memorable match of the campaign was a 2–3 loss to Portugal in Porto, where Latvia rallied from a 0–3 halftime deficit with two goals from young striker Vīts Rimkus, who became the team's top scorer of the campaign with five goals in five matches. This period also saw the emergence of new talents such as Imants Bleidelis, Andrejs Štolcers, and Igors Stepanovs.

In the qualification for the 1998 FIFA World Cup, Latvia faced tough competition, narrowly losing to Austria, Scotland, and Sweden. However, the team secured victories against Belarus and Estonia. By this time, the squad's core included Skonto FC players such as Vitālijs Astafjevs, Igors Stepanovs, Marians Pahars, and Andrejs Štolcers.

In late 1997, Jānis Gilis stepped down as head coach, marking the end of an era. Around the same time, team captain and defensive leader Jurijs Ševļakovs retired from international football. These years laid the groundwork for Latvia's growing competitiveness on the international stage.

=== The 100th game of the restored Latvian national team ===
On 8 April 1992, after a 52-year hiatus, the restored Latvian national football team played its first match in Bucharest, losing 0–2 to Romania. This marked Latvia's 100th match in its football history, with 10,000 spectators in attendance. The players experienced unfamiliar conditions, as accommodations, catering, and training facilities were of the highest standard.

A notable figure in the Latvian Football Federation (LFF) delegation was Vadims Ulbergs, who had witnessed the previous match between Latvia and Romania in 1937, a 0–0 draw at the ASK Stadium in Riga. The match in Bucharest attracted significant media attention, with representatives from all teams in the upcoming qualification cycle present, including the Belgian coach Paul Van Himst.

Romania fielded an almost full-strength team, with the only notable absence being Gheorghe Hagi, who was withheld by Real Madrid. The match also marked the debut of Romania's coach, Cornel Dinu. The game was hosted at the Complexul Sportiv Steaua, referred to as the "Temple of Romanian Football," built under the direction of one of Nicolae Ceaușescu's sons and maintained by the army. Tickets for the match were priced at 150 lei, approximately $2.50.

Latvia’s head coach, Jānis Gilis, opted to trust younger players and implemented a tactical scheme with two free defenders, placing additional pressure on the midfielders and forwards. The first half was promising, but in the second half, a lack of discipline allowed Romania to dominate territorially.

The match began with a costly mistake when goalkeeper Raimonds Laizāns slipped while preparing to save a 30-meter shot from Pavel Badea, allowing the ball to soar into the net. Latvia had an opportunity to equalize when Aivars Drupass, assisted by Jurijs Popkovs, made a sharp strike from six meters, but Romania’s goalkeeper Bogdan Stelea reacted brilliantly. Another defensive error early in the second half led to Romania’s second goal. Despite this, Laizāns recovered his composure, earning applause for saving a free kick by Gabi Balint in the 84th minute.

Rolands Bulders also came close to scoring but could not produce a strong enough shot in a favorable position. While the team showed resilience, Gilis expressed disappointment with some players, including Vitālijs Teplovs and Aivars Drupass, who played with a minor injury. Ilmārs Verpakovskis, meanwhile, struggled due to his age. Gilis emphasized the need for a stronger attack, acknowledging that solid defence alone would not secure victories.

Romanian observers were astonished to learn that none of the Latvian players had ever competed for the Soviet national football team or played in the Soviet Top League. This game provided Latvia with an opportunity to showcase its potential on the international stage, serving as a catalyst for growth. However, progress was hampered by a lack of professionalism in some teams and a casual attitude toward training among certain players.

=== The Starkovs–Verpakovskis era and UEFA Euro 2004 (2001–2004) ===
Following Gary Johnson's departure, the experienced Skonto FC head coach Aleksandrs Starkovs was appointed as the head coach of the Latvian national team. Under Starkovs' leadership, Latvia finished the 2002 FIFA World Cup qualification cycle with three narrow defeats against group favorites.

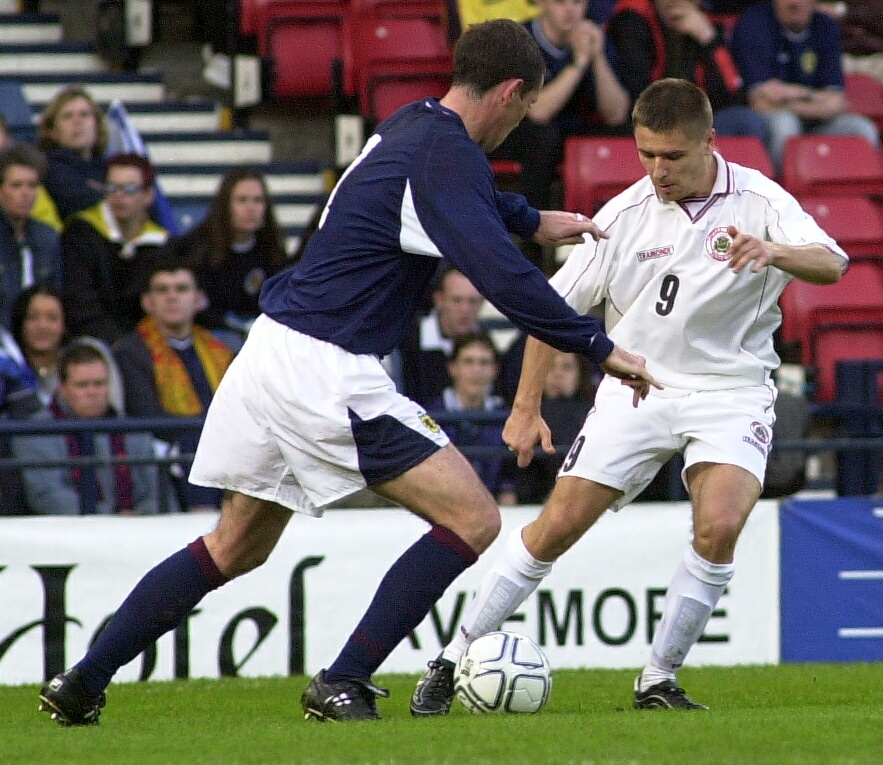
Marians Pahars Against Scotland in the 2002 FIFA World Cup Qualifiers

The UEFA Euro 2004 qualification campaign began with a 0–0 draw against Sweden, followed by a vital 1–0 victory over Poland. Latvia then secured two wins against San Marino but suffered a setback with a loss to Hungary. Māris Verpakovskis emerged as the team's new offensive leader, replacing injury-plagued Marians Pahars, while veteran striker Vīts Rimkus returned to the squad.

Despite a 0–2 loss to Poland, which complicated Latvia’s position in the standings, the team rebounded with a 3–1 win over Hungary and a crucial 1–0 victory against Sweden. Verpakovskis scored in both matches, helping Latvia secure second place in their group and earn a spot in the play-offs.

In November 2003, Latvia faced Turkey, a strong opponent who had recently reached the semi-finals of the 2002 FIFA World Cup. In the first leg in Riga, Verpakovskis scored the only goal, giving Latvia a 1–0 advantage. The second leg in Istanbul was dramatic, with Turkey taking a 2–0 lead. However, Latvia fought back with goals from Juris Laizāns and Verpakovskis, securing a 2–2 draw. With a 3–2 aggregate victory, Latvia qualified for the UEFA European Championship for the first time in its history.

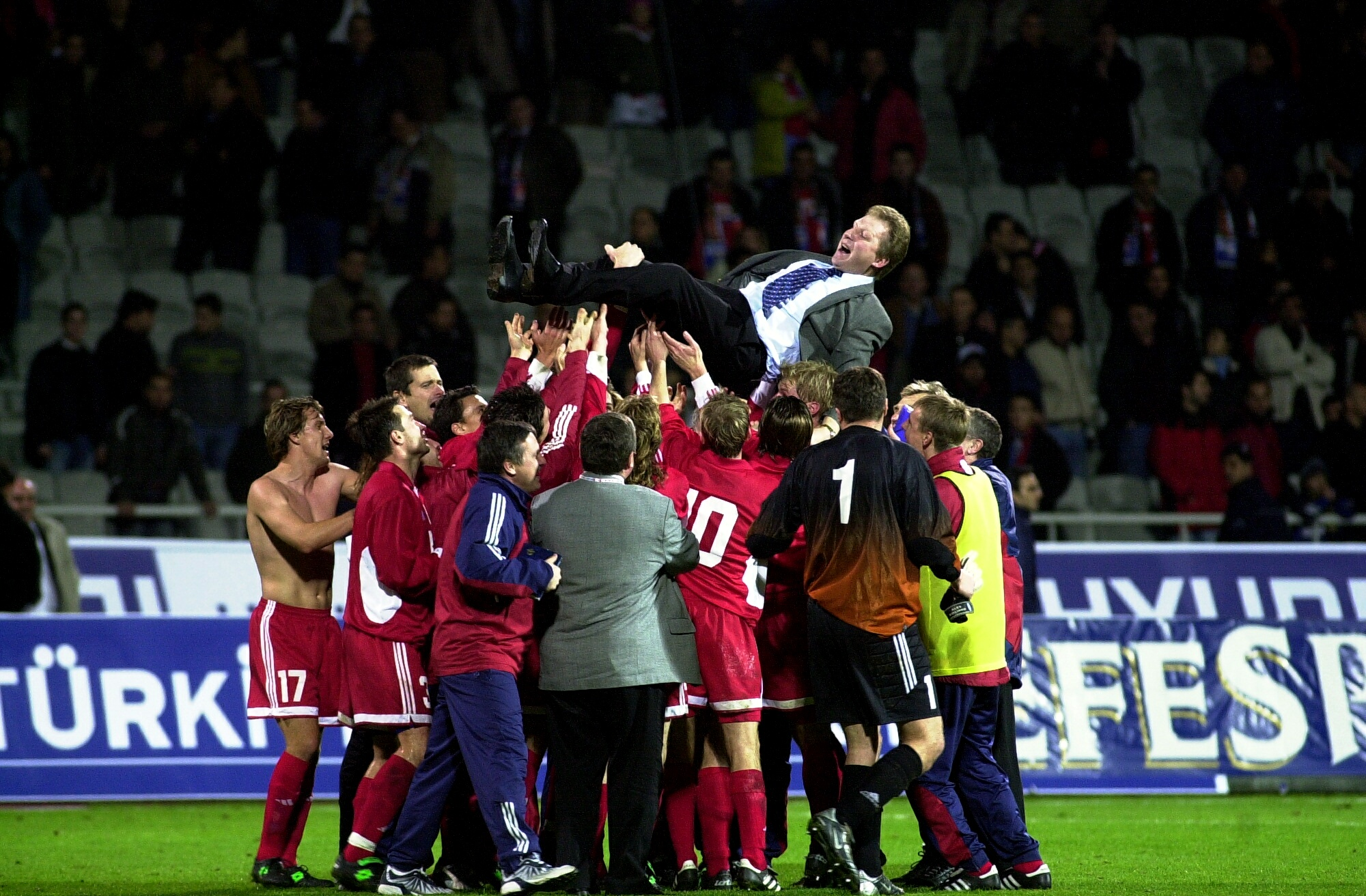
Latvia's National Team Celebrates Euro 2004 Qualification in Turkey

The key players during this period included Verpakovskis, captain Vitālijs Astafjevs, midfielders Juris Laizāns and Andrejs Rubins, defenders Mihails Zemļinskis and Igors Stepanovs, and goalkeeper Aleksandrs Koliņko.

=== Performance at UEFA Euro 2004 ===
In the UEFA Euro 2004 finals held in Portugal, Latvia was drawn into a challenging group alongside the Czech Republic, Germany, and the Netherlands. In their opening match, Latvia delivered a strong performance but lost 1–2 to the Czech Republic, with Verpakovskis scoring Latvia’s first-ever goal in a major tournament.

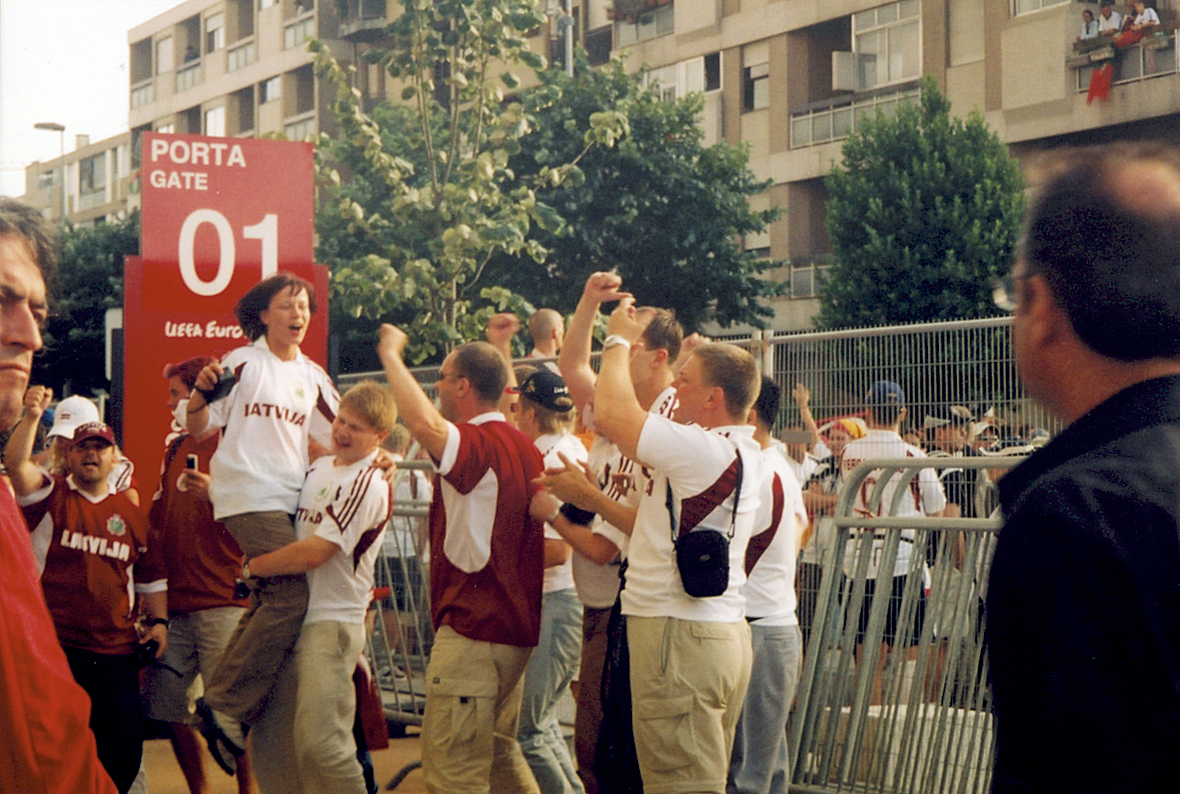
Latvian fans at Euro 2004

The second match against Germany was historic, as Latvia achieved a 0–0 draw, earning their first point at a European Championship. The final group stage match saw Latvia face the Netherlands, where they suffered a 0–3 defeat, ending their journey in the tournament.

Although Latvia did not advance past the group stage, their performances, especially the draw against Germany, were widely praised. The campaign marked a golden era for Latvian football, with Starkovs' strategic leadership and Verpakovskis' outstanding form bringing the team to unprecedented heights.

=== 2006 FIFA World Cup qualification ===
After Latvia's historic success at UEFA Euro 2004, Aleksandrs Starkovs remained at the helm of the national team, but subsequent results failed to meet the high expectations set during the golden era. Latvia struggled in the qualification campaigns for the 2006 FIFA World Cup and UEFA Euro 2008. The team faced challenges in maintaining consistency, and the departure of key players like Māris Verpakovskis and Mihails Zemļinskis from their peak form further weakened the squad.

Under Aleksandrs Starkovs, Latvia began its 2006 FIFA World Cup qualification campaign, but controversy struck in the opening match against Portugal when Starkovs was suspended for six games. His assistant, Jurijs Andrejevs, took charge from the sidelines, while Starkovs continued as head coach for the next four matches.

In November 2004, Starkovs resigned from his role, opting to manage Spartak Moscow in Russia. Andrejevs was promoted to head coach but failed to deliver notable success. Latvia ended the qualification cycle in 5th place in their group with 15 points from 12 matches. The team managed victories only against Luxembourg and Liechtenstein and drew with Russia, Estonia, and Slovakia. Notably, Latvia suffered their first defeat to Estonia since 1940, losing 1–2.

=== UEFA Euro 2008 qualification ===
Latvia’s campaign for Euro 2008 began in a group featuring Spain, Sweden, Denmark, Iceland, Northern Ireland, and Liechtenstein. The team started with a narrow 0–1 loss to Sweden at home, followed by a 4–0 victory over Iceland and a 0–1 defeat to Northern Ireland.

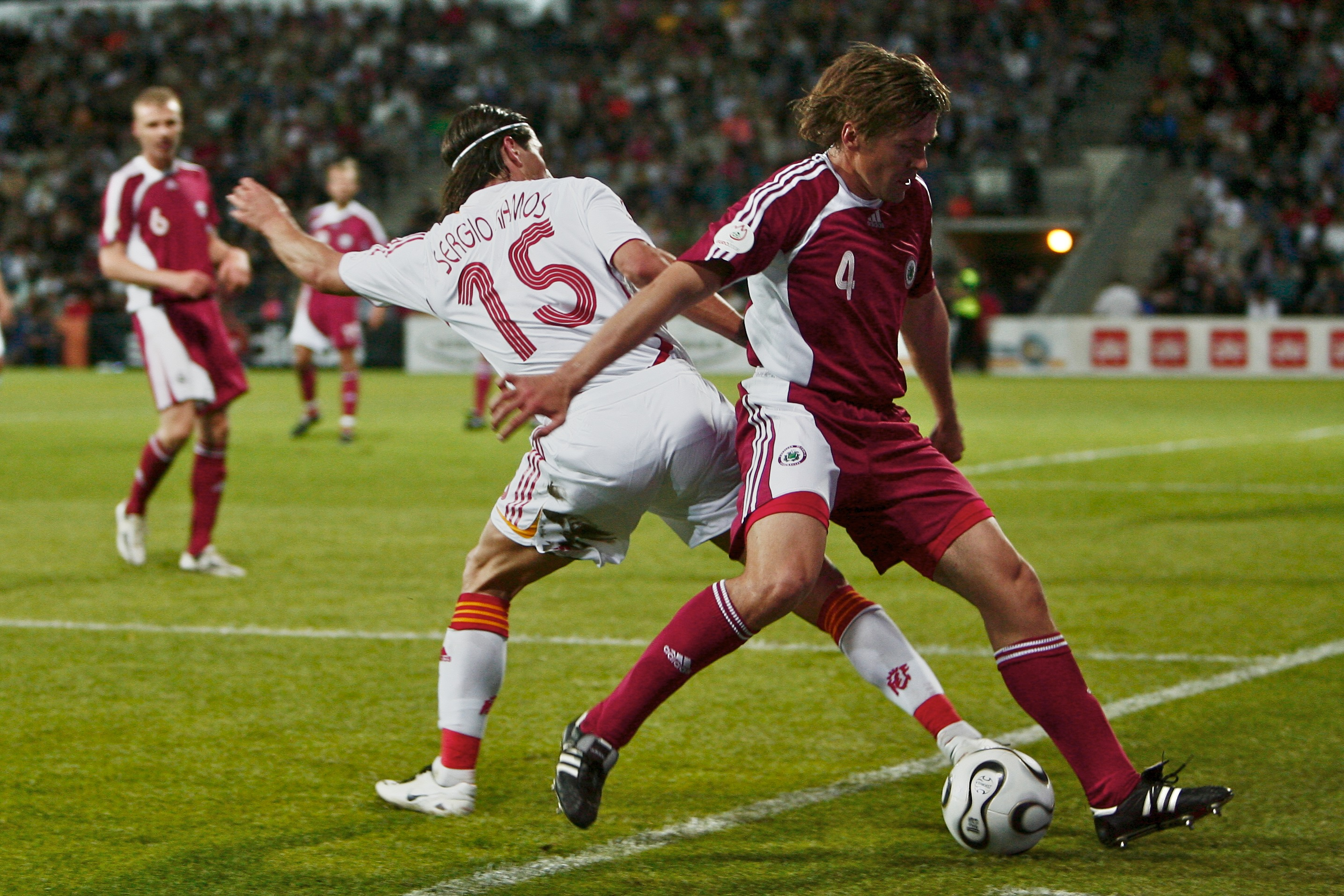
Dzintars Zirnis in a Battle Against Sergio Ramos

After a shock loss to Liechtenstein in March 2007, Andrejevs resigned as head coach. In April, Aleksandrs Starkovs returned to lead the team. Under his guidance, Latvia achieved victories over Liechtenstein, Iceland, and Northern Ireland, but suffered defeats to Spain, Denmark, and Sweden. Latvia concluded the qualification cycle in fifth place in their group.

=== 2010 FIFA World Cup qualification ===
During his second tenure, Starkovs aimed to rebuild the team by integrating younger players while relying on experienced veterans like Vitālijs Astafjevs and Māris Verpakovskis to provide leadership. While Latvia did not achieve the same level of success as during the early 2000s, Starkovs' influence helped maintain competitiveness and ensured that the team remained a respected opponent in international football. In the fall of 2008, Latvia began their qualification campaign for the 2010 FIFA World Cup. Drawn into a group with Greece, Israel, Switzerland, Moldova, and Luxembourg, Latvia opened with a 2–1 victory over Moldova in Chișinău. However, the team then suffered defeats to group favorites Greece (0–2 at home) and Switzerland (1–2 away), despite a headed goal from Deniss Ivanovs.

Latvia bounced back with a 1–1 draw against Israel in Riga and two wins against Luxembourg (4–0 away and 2–0 at home). The team then defeated Israel 1–0 in Tel Aviv to keep their hopes for a top-two finish alive .

On 9 September 2009, Latvia drew 2–2 against Switzerland at Skonto Stadium, which kept them in contention for second place as Greece surprisingly drew 1–1 against Moldova in Chișinău.

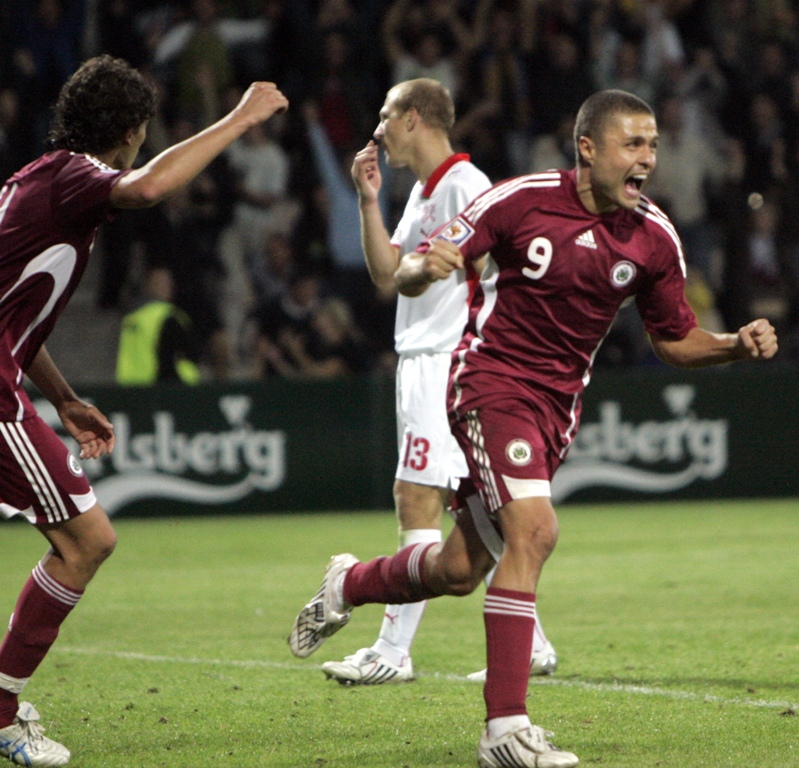
Latvia's National Team Draws Against Switzerland in 2009

In the penultimate and decisive match of the 2010 FIFA World Cup qualification, Latvia faced Greece at the Athens Olympic Stadium. Despite taking a 2–1 lead in the first half through Māris Verpakovskis, a controversial penalty awarded to Greece early in the second half turned the tide. Theofanis Gekas scored from the spot and added two more goals, while Georgios Samaras also found the net, resulting in a 2–5 loss for Latvia.

In the final match of the campaign, Latvia defeated Moldova 3–2 at home. Despite finishing third in the group, Latvia narrowly missed out on qualification.

==== Group standings situation ====
As of the decisive matches, the group standings were tightly contested, with Latvia demonstrating resilience and ambition under Starkovs’ leadership. The team's ability to challenge strong opponents marked a continued effort to build on the success of the early 2000s.

Position	Team	Points
1.	Switzerland	17
2.	Greece	14
3.	Latvia	14
4.	Israel	12
5.	Luxembourg	5
6.	Moldova	3

=== UEFA Euro 2012 qualification ===
From September 2010 to October 2011, Latvia competed in the UEFA Euro 2012 qualifying tournament, drawn into Group F with Greece, Croatia, Israel, Georgia, and Malta.

Latvia began the campaign with a 0–3 home defeat to Croatia, followed by a 2–0 away win against Malta. In October, Latvia lost 0–1 to Greece in Athens but secured a last-minute 1–1 draw against Georgia in Riga thanks to a Aleksandrs Cauņa's equalizer.

The 2011 campaign saw Latvia lose twice to Israel (1–2 both home and away) before securing a 1–0 victory against Georgia in Tbilisi and a 1–1 draw with Greece in Riga. Latvia ended the cycle with a 2–0 win over Malta but concluded with a 0–2 loss to Croatia. Latvia finished fourth in the group, missing out on qualification.

=== 2014 FIFA World Cup qualification ===
Latvia participated in the 2014 FIFA World Cup qualification from September 2012 to October 2013. The team was placed in Group G alongside Greece, Slovakia, Bosnia and Herzegovina, Lithuania, and Liechtenstein.

Latvia started with losses to Greece (1–2), Bosnia and Herzegovina (1–4), and Slovakia (1–2) but managed a 2–0 victory against Liechtenstein. However, their form faltered in 2013, starting with a disappointing 1–1 draw against Liechtenstein and a heavy 0–5 loss to Bosnia and Herzegovina.

Following the Bosnia defeat, there were calls within the Latvian Football Federation (LFF) to dismiss head coach Aleksandrs Starkovs, but the board voted against it. Despite the decision, Starkovs later submitted his resignation.

=== Transition to Pahars' leadership ===
After Starkovs' resignation, former national team player Marians Pahars was appointed as head coach with a contract extending until the end of the 2018 FIFA World Cup qualification cycle. This marked a new chapter for the Latvian national team, as Pahars sought to rejuvenate the squad and improve its competitiveness on the international stage.

==== Marians Pahars era (2013–2017) ====
===== First matches and early success =====
Marians Pahars’ tenure as head coach of the Latvian national football team began with a friendly match against Estonia, which ended in a 1–1 draw. His first victory came on 6 September 2013, during the 2014 FIFA World Cup qualification campaign, with a 2–1 win against Lithuania in Riga. However, the team suffered two away losses (0–1 against both Greece and Lithuania) before finishing the campaign with a 2–2 draw against Slovakia. Latvia concluded the qualification cycle in 5th place in their group, ahead of Liechtenstein but trailing Lithuania by three points.

===== Baltic Cup Victory =====
In the 2014 Baltic Cup, Latvia defeated Estonia in the semifinals following a penalty shootout and secured the title by beating Lithuania 1–0 in the final, with Nauris Bulvītis scoring the winning goal. This victory marked Latvia's 22nd Baltic Cup win.

===== UEFA Euro 2016 qualification =====
The UEFA Euro 2016 qualification campaign was Pahars’ first full qualification cycle as head coach. Latvia was drawn into Group A alongside the Czech Republic, Iceland, Kazakhstan, the Netherlands, and Turkey.

Latvia started with a 0–0 draw away against Kazakhstan. They then lost 0–3 at home to Iceland, followed by a 1–1 draw with Turkey. A heavy 0–6 defeat to the Netherlands concluded the year. In 2015, Latvia drew 1–1 against the Czech Republic, conceding an equalizer in the 90th minute, and lost 0–2 in a rematch against the Netherlands.

A 1–1 draw in Turkey and a 2–2 draw in Iceland highlighted occasional resilience. However, the campaign ended on a sour note with a 0–1 home defeat to Kazakhstan, leaving Latvia in last place (6th) in the group standings. Latvia rebounded in June 2016 by winning the Baltic Cup for the 23rd time. They defeated Lithuania 2–1 and drew 0–0 with Estonia to secure the title.

=== 2018 FIFA World cup qualification and resignation ===
Latvia began their 2018 FIFA World Cup qualification campaign with a promising 1–0 away win against Andorra. However, the team struggled in subsequent matches:

Losses to the Faroe Islands (0–2), Hungary (0–2), Portugal (1–4), and Switzerland (0–1) followed. On 28 March 2017, Latvia suffered a crushing 0–5 defeat to Georgia in a friendly match. This prompted Marians Pahars to submit his resignation, ending his tenure as head coach.

Despite occasional successes, including two Baltic Cup victories, Pahars’ time as coach was marked by inconsistency in competitive matches, culminating in a disappointing World Cup qualification campaign.

=== Starkovs' third stint and foreign coaches (2017–2020) ===
==== Starkovs' third term ====
On 19 April 2017, Aleksandrs Starkovs was appointed head coach of the Latvian national team for the third time, replacing Marians Pahars. Starkovs' return saw a series of disappointing results, with the sole victory being a 1–0 win against Andorra on 10 October in the final match of the 2018 FIFA World Cup qualification campaign.

During his tenure, Latvia reached its lowest-ever FIFA World Ranking, falling to 148th place in September 2017. After a shocking 0–1 loss to Gibraltar on 25 March 2018, Starkovs was dismissed.

==== Miksu Paatelainen (2018–2019) ====
On 24 May 2018, Finnish coach Miksu Paatelainen was appointed head coach. Under his leadership, Latvia won the 2018 Baltic Cup, a bright moment amidst otherwise underwhelming results.

Latvia’s campaign in the 2018–19 UEFA Nations League was considered disappointing by many. In their League D group alongside Georgia, Kazakhstan, and Andorra, Latvia failed to win a match, collecting only four points and finishing third in the group. Following these results, Paatelainen left his position as head coach.

==== Slaviša Stojanović (2019–2020) ====
On 1 March 2019, Slovenian coach Slaviša Stojanović was named head coach. His tenure was marked by a record nine consecutive defeats during the UEFA Euro 2020 qualification campaign. Latvia managed only one win, a surprise 1–0 victory over Austria in their final group match.

Latvia finished last in their group, which included Poland, Austria, North Macedonia, Slovenia, and Israel. In January 2020, the Latvian Football Federation terminated its contract with Stojanović, ending a tumultuous chapter in the team’s history.

=== Dainis Kazakevičs’ era: the positive vector and challenges (2020–2023) ===
In early 2020, the Latvian football community increasingly voiced the need for a local specialist to lead the national team—someone familiar with the nuances of Latvian football. Amid political uncertainty within the Latvian Football Federation (LFF), which was briefly without a president, the regular rotation of head coaches seemed unlikely to yield a long-term solution. Thus, following Slaviša Stojanović’s dismissal, Dainis Kazakevičs was appointed as head coach for a three-year term.

==== Early struggles and Nations League campaigns ====
In the 2020–2021 UEFA Nations League, Latvia competed in Group D alongside the Faroe Islands, Malta, and Andorra. Despite high hopes, the team failed to secure a win in its first five matches, drawing four and losing to Malta. Latvia finally claimed a decisive 5–0 victory against Andorra in the last game but finished third in the group.

Despite this disappointing start, the LFF remained committed to Kazakevičs’ long-term vision. This decision bore fruit with an eight-match unbeaten streak (including friendlies) and Latvia's triumph in the 2022–2023 UEFA Nations League. Latvia won their group against Andorra, Moldova, and Liechtenstein, securing promotion to League C.

==== Late setbacks and narrow success ====
The campaign nearly unraveled in the penultimate match, where Latvia suffered a surprising 1–2 defeat to Moldova in front of a packed home crowd in Riga. This result left the decisive final game against Andorra fraught with tension.

In Andorra, Latvia took the lead in the 50th minute through Vladislavs Gutkovskis. However, a critical error by goalkeeper Pāvels Šteinbors allowed Andorra to equalize two minutes before full time. The draw left the team stunned, but Latvia retained first place in the group due to a superior goal difference over Moldova, earning promotion to League C. Unfortunately, the shaky end to the season dashed Latvia’s hopes of securing a playoff spot for UEFA Euro 2024.

==== Mounting criticism and Kazakevičs’ departure ====
Kazakevičs faced criticism from the outset, with skeptics questioning his suitability for the role. Although the five-match winning streak in 2022 brought some relief, doubts persisted. By 2023, public pressure reached a peak, with the slogan “DainisOut” gaining traction.

The national team’s performance in 2023 exacerbated discontent. Out of ten matches, Latvia lost nine, scoring just two goals in their last six games. Even a win over Armenia was overshadowed by fan protests, as supporters demonstratively left the stands during the first half, demanding Kazakevičs’ resignation.

The sustained public and media pressure eventually led to the termination of Kazakevičs’ contract.

== Team image ==
=== Kits ===

Latvia's kit is traditionally a carmine red jersey with white trim, carmine red shorts and socks, whilst their current away kit is all predominantly white. Latvia's kits have been produced by Adidas more than 25 years.

=== Crest ===
Until July 2018, the team crest consisted of the Latvian Football Federation logo, when it was switched to a shield with a football in the colors of the Latvian flag and 'LATVIJA' written above. A similar crest with a head of a howling wolf was also unveiled as a secondary logo for use in souvenirs etc. as part of the #11vilki (#11wolves) brand.

=== Kit suppliers ===
Kit supplier	Period
(England) Umbro	1992-1994
(Germany) Adidas	1994-1996
(Austria) Tro	1996–1998
(Germany) Puma	1998–2000
(Switzerland) Tramondi	2000–2002
(Germany) Adidas	2002–present

== Media coverage ==
All Latvian matches are currently broadcast with full commentary on the Go3 web streaming service, owned by TV3 Group. Since the 1990s, LTV7 (initially LTV2) was the broadcaster of all of the team games, before the All Media Baltics conglomerate took over broadcasting rights in September 2018. Games were broadcast on the group's TV6 channel and the TVPlay and Viaplay streaming platforms. All Media Baltics later became TV3 Group.

From the 2022 season until the 2028 season, Latvia's home and away qualifiers, and friendlies both home and away were broadcast live exclusively by Swedish Viaplay Group on their web streaming service. On 20 July 2023, Viaplay announced that it will leave the market of the Baltic states. Upon exiting, all sports licenses owned by Viasat - including the Baltic broadcasting rights for the Baltic Cup, UEFA Champions League, Premier League, Formula 1 and the NHL - were acquired by TV3 Group. This means that the matches of the Latvian national football team are returning LTV7, in September 2024.

== Stadium ==
In recent years, the home venue of the team has fluctuated between Skonto Stadium and the Daugava Stadium in Riga. Daugava was the main venue of the team from 1992 to 2000, when Skonto Stadium was unveiled as a temporary location due to the planned renovation of the Daugava. However, the renovation of the complex only began in 2017, with the first stage completed a year later.

The team then returned to the Daugava after an 18-year absence in the summer of 2018 with a game against Estonia on 2 June. However, since mid-2022 home matches were once again temporarily moved to Skonto Stadium due to problems with the grass pitch and other issues. Works on replacing and upgrading the pitch began in October 2023. At the time, Latvian Football Federation president Vadims Ļašenko said that Skonto would become the main home of the men's team, with Daugava serving as a backup and the venue for the women's and youth national teams.

In the interwar era between 1921 and 1940, games were held in various locations such as the Army Sports Club Stadium in Riga and others.

=== Home venues record ===
The following table provides a summary of Latvia's results at home venues since 1992.

As of 18 November 2024.

Stadium	City / town	Pld	W	D	L	Win %	Last match hosted
Skonto Stadium	Riga	70	21	15	34	30.0	2024
Daugava Stadium	Riga	39	15	7	17	38.5	2022
Daugava Stadium	Liepāja	8	5	0	3	62.5	2024
Olympic Stadium	Ventspils	1	1	0	0	100.0	2002
ASK Stadium	Riga	1	0	0	1	0.0	1994
Ozolnieki Stadium	Ozolnieki	1	0	1	0	0.0	1994
Totals		102	35	23	44		—

== Results and fixtures ==
The following is a list of match results in the last 12 months, as well as any future matches that have been scheduled.

Win Draw Loss Fixture

=== 2026 ===
26 March 2026 2024–25 Nations League promotion/relegation play-offs	Gibraltar	0–1	Latvia	Europa Point, Gibraltar
18:00 UTC+1		Report	Gutkovskis 64' (pen.)	Stadium: Europa Sports Park; Attendance: 1,442; Referee: Ivan Kružliak (Slovakia)

31 March 2026 2024–25 Nations League promotion/relegation play-offs	Latvia	1–0 (2–0 agg.)	Gibraltar	Riga, Latvia
19:00 UTC+3	Černomordijs 90+3'	Report		Stadium: Skonto Stadium; Attendance: 5,120; Referee: Sandro Schärer (Switzerland)

6 June 2026 2026 Baltic Cup	Lithuania	1–1 (5–4 p)	Latvia	Kaunas, Lithuania
16:00 UTC+3	Kučys 28'	Report	Toņiševs 60'	Stadium: Darius and Girėnas Stadium; Attendance: 7,789; Referee: Joonas Jaanotivs (Estonia)
	Penalties
	Utkus (penalty scored); Gineitis (penalty scored); Kučys (penalty scored); Michelbrink (penalty missed); Novikovas (penalty scored); Burba (penalty scored)		(penalty scored) Regža; (penalty scored) Ķigurs; (penalty missed) Meļņiks; (penalty scored) Cigaņiks; (penalty scored) Saveļjevs; (penalty missed) Penkevics

9 June 2026 2026 Baltic Cup	Latvia	0–1	Faroe Islands	Riga, Latvia
18:00 UTC+3		Report	Sørensen 81'	Stadium: LNK Sporta Parks; Attendance: 729; Referee: Dovydas Švėgžda (Lithuania)

25 September 2026 2026–27 Nations League	Armenia	2–0	Latvia	Yerevan, Armenia
20:00 UTC+4	Arutyunyan 31'; Gharibyan 75'	Report		Stadium: Vazgen Sargsyan Republican Stadium; Attendance: 11,093; Referee: Martin Matoša (Slovenia)

28 September 2026 2026–27 Nations League	Latvia	0–0	Cyprus	Riga, Latvia
19:00 UTC+3		Report		Stadium: Skonto Stadium; Attendance: 6,069; Referee: Michal Očenáš (Slovakia)

2 October 2026 2026–27 Nations League	Latvia	1–2	Montenegro	Riga, Latvia
19:00 UTC+3	Strods 82'	Report	Adzic 3', 56'	Stadium: Skonto Stadium; Attendance: 6,149; Referee: Radoslav Gidzhenov (Bulgaria)

5 October 2026 2026–27 Nations League	Cyprus	2–1	Latvia	Nicosia, Cyprus
19:00 UTC+3	Kosti 70'; Edwards 90+4'	Report	Dašķevičs 57'	Stadium: GSP Stadium; Attendance: 2,354; Referee: Giorgi Kruashvili (Georgia)

12 November 2026 2026–27 Nations League	Montenegro	2–1	Latvia	Podgorica, Montenegro
20:45 UTC+1	Krstović 70'; Maraš 90+1'	Report	Meļņiks 72'	Stadium: Podgorica City Stadium; Attendance: 5,799; Referee: Jérôme Brisard (France)

15 November 2026 2026–27 Nations League	Latvia	0–0	Armenia	Riga, Latvia
16:00 UTC+2		Report		Stadium: Skonto Stadium; Attendance: 5,355; Referee: Vasilios Fotias (Greece)

== Coaching staff ==
As of 15 November 2026.

Position	Name
Head coach	Vacant
Assistant coach
(Latvia) Aleksandrs Cauņa
Video analyst	(Latvia) Iļja Ščaņicins
Fitness coach	(Latvia) Māris Smirnovs
Goalkeeping coach	Vacant
Physiotherapist	(Latvia) Artūrs Ivuškāns
Physiotherapist	(Latvia) Jurijs Ksenzovs
Physiotherapist	(Latvia) Dmitrijs Jefremenkovs
Masseur	(Latvia) Sergejs Avakovs
Doctor	(Latvia) Boriss Novikovs
Manager	(Latvia) Roberts Mežeckis
Kitman	(Latvia) Niks Jansons

=== Manager statistics ===
As of 20 November 2026.

Team	From	To	Record				
Team	From	To	G	W	D	L	Win %
Juris Rēdlihs-Raiskums	1922	1924	3	0	2	1	0.00
Willi Malošík	1924	1924	4	2	0	2	50.00
Walter Wilson	1925	1925	3	0	2	1	0.00
Ferenc Molnár	1926	1926	4	2	0	2	50.00
Karl Kurz	1927	1927	5	2	0	3	40.00
Jānis Lapiņš	1932	1932	1	0	0	1	0.00
Ferenc Voggenhuber	1935	1935	9	1	5	3	11.11
Rudolf Stanzel	1936	1939	25	14	6	5	56.00
Kārlis Upenieks	1940	1940	1	0	1	0	0.00
Jānis Gilis	1992	1997	61	17	11	33	27.87
Revaz Dzodzuashvili	1998	1999	18	5	3	10	27.78
Gary Johnson	1999	2001	15	3	3	9	20.00
Aleksandrs Starkovs	2001	2004	43	16	8	19	37.21
Jurijs Andrejevs	2004	2007	27	5	8	14	18.52
Aleksandrs Starkovs	2007	2013	62	18	13	31	29.03
Marians Pahars	2013	2017	33	7	11	15	21.21
Aleksandrs Starkovs	2017	2018	11	1	2	8	9.09
Mixu Paatelainen	2018	2018	9	1	5	3	11.11
Slaviša Stojanović	2019	2020	10	1	0	9	10.00
Dainis Kazakevičs	2020	2023	41	11	12	18	26.83
Paolo Nicolato	2024	2026	30	5	10	15	16.67

=== Coaching history ===
- (Latvia) Juris Rēdlihs-Raiskums (1922–1924)
- (Austria) Willi Malošík (1924)
- (England) Walter Wilson (1925)
- (Hungary) Ferenc Molnár (1926)
- (Austria) Karl Kurz (1927)
- (Austria) Willi Malošík (1929)
- (Latvia) Juris Rēdlihs-Raiskums (1930–1931)
- (Latvia) Jānis Lapiņš (1932)
- (Hungary) Ferenc Voggenhuber (1935)
- (Austria) Rudolf Stanzel (1936–1939)
- (Latvia) Kārlis Upenieks (1940)
- (Latvia) Jānis Gilis (1992–1997)
- (Georgia (country)) Revaz Dzodzuashvili (1998–1999)
- (England) Gary Johnson (1999–2001)
- (Latvia) Aleksandrs Starkovs (2001–2004)
- (Latvia) Jurijs Andrejevs (2004–2007)
- (Latvia) Aleksandrs Starkovs (2007–2013)
- (Latvia) Marians Pahars (2013–2017)
- (Latvia) Aleksandrs Starkovs (2017–2018)
- (Finland) Mixu Paatelainen (2018)
- (Slovenia) Slaviša Stojanović (2019–2020)
- (Latvia) Dainis Kazakevičs (2020–2023)
- (Italy) Paolo Nicolato (2024–2026)

== Players ==
=== Current squad ===
- The following players were named in the squad for 2026–27 UEFA Nations League matches against Armenia, Cyprus (twice), and Montenegro between September 25 and October 5.
- Caps and goals correct as of 5 October 2026, after the match against Cyprus.

No.	Pos.	Player	Date of birth (age)	Caps	Goals	Club
1	GK	Nils Puriņš	1 August 1998 (age 28)	3	0	(Latvian Football Federation) Auda
12	GK	Frenks Orols	26 June 2000 (age 26)	2	0	(Latvian Football Federation) Riga
23	GK	Rihards Matrevics	18 March 1999 (age 27)	22	0	(Latvian Football Federation) RFS
2	DF	Daniels Balodis	10 June 1998 (age 28)	28	1	(Latvian Football Federation) Auda
4	DF	Oskars Vientiess	8 October 2002 (age 24)	4	0	(Football Association of the Czech Republic) Teplice
5	DF	Oskars Rubenis	3 February 1999 (age 27)	0	0	(Latvian Football Federation) Auda
11	DF	Roberts Savaļnieks	4 February 1993 (age 33)	77	2	(Latvian Football Federation) RFS
13	DF	Raivis Jurkovskis	9 December 1996 (age 29)	66	0	(Latvian Football Federation) Riga
14	DF	Andrejs Cigaņiks	12 April 1997 (age 29)	77	4	(Swiss Football Association) Luzern
19	DF	Maksims Toņiševs	12 May 2000 (age 26)	12	1	(Latvian Football Federation) Riga
21	DF	Deniss Meļņiks	7 September 2002 (age 24)	17	0	(Scottish Football Association) Falkirk
	DF	Antonijs Černomordijs	26 September 1996 (age 30)	53	3	(Latvian Football Federation) Riga
	DF	Dennis Cirkin	6 April 2002 (age 24)	3	0	(The Football Association) Queens Park Rangers
3	MF	Gļebs Žaleiko	27 July 2004 (age 22)	2	0	(Latvian Football Federation) Jelgava
8	MF	Eduards Emsis	23 February 1996 (age 30)	36	2	(Latvian Football Federation) Super Nova
10	MF	Lukass Vapne	31 August 2003 (age 23)	25	0	(Norwegian Football Federation) Sogndal
15	MF	Dmitrijs Zelenkovs	15 May 2000 (age 26)	29	1	(Latvian Football Federation) RFS
16	MF	Kristers Čudars	3 September 1999 (age 27)	2	0	(Latvian Football Federation) Ogre United
17	MF	Markuss Strods	10 October 2006 (age 20)	4	1	(Football Association of Ireland) Bohemians
22	MF	Aleksejs Saveļjevs	30 January 1999 (age 27)	38	1	(Kyrgyz Football Union) Asia Talas
	MF	Kristaps Grabovskis	14 June 2005 (age 21)	4	0	(Georgian Football Federation) Dila Gori
6	FW	Danila Patijčuks	22 March 2003 (age 23)	3	0	(Latvian Football Federation) Liepāja
7	FW	Eduards Dašķevičs	12 July 2002 (age 24)	29	1	(Latvian Football Federation) Auda
9	FW	Vladislavs Gutkovskis	2 April 1995 (age 31)	66	14	(Polish Football Association) Arka Gdynia
18	FW	Alberts Aleksanjans	10 March 2006 (age 20)	2	0	(Swedish Football Association) Norrköping
20	FW	Roberts Uldriķis	3 April 1998 (age 28)	61	8	(Royal Dutch Football Association) Heerenveen
	FW	Jānis Ikaunieks	16 February 1995 (age 31)	74	12	(Latvian Football Federation) RFS

=== Recent call-ups ===
The following players have been called up within the last twelve months.

Pos.	Player	Date of birth (age)	Caps	Goals	Club	Latest call-up
GK	Krišjānis Zviedris	21 January 1997 (age 29)	6	0	(Latvia) Riga	v. Faroe Islands, 9 June 2026
DF	Vitālijs Jagodinskis	28 February 1992 (age 34)	38	0	(Cambodia) Visakha	v. Faroe Islands, 9 June 2026
DF	Roberts Veips	22 February 2000 (age 26)	5	0	(Latvia) RFS	v. Faroe Islands, 9 June 2026
DF	Emīls Birka	25 April 2000 (age 26)	1	0	(Latvia) Riga	v. Gibraltar, 26 March 2026
DF	Niks Sliede	8 March 2004 (age 22)	1	0	(Latvia) RFS	v. Gibraltar, 26 March 2026
MF	Mārtiņš Ķigurs	31 March 1997 (age 29)	15	0	(Latvia) RFS	v. Faroe Islands, 9 June 2026
MF	Kristers Penkevics	28 January 2003 (age 23)	1	0	(Czech Republic) Zlín	v. Faroe Islands, 9 June 2026
MF	Iļja Korotkovs	24 May 2000 (age 26)	0	0	(Latvia) Liepāja	v. Faroe Islands, 9 June 2026
MF	Renārs Varslavāns	23 August 2001 (age 25)	22	1	(Latvia) Riga	v. Gibraltar, 26 March 2026
MF	Bruno Melnis ^{INJ}	21 January 2004 (age 22)	4	0	(Latvia) Liepāja	v. Gibraltar, 26 March 2026
FW	Marko Regža	20 January 1999 (age 27)	15	0	(Hungary) Nyíregyháza	v. Faroe Islands, 9 June 2026
FW	Dario Šits	4 February 2004 (age 22)	10	2	(Netherlands) Dordrecht	v. Faroe Islands, 9 June 2026
^{RET} Retired from national team^{INJ} Injured player^{WD} Withdrew from the squad due to non-injury issue

== Player records ==
As of 31 March 2026
Players in bold are still active with Latvia.

=== Most appearances ===
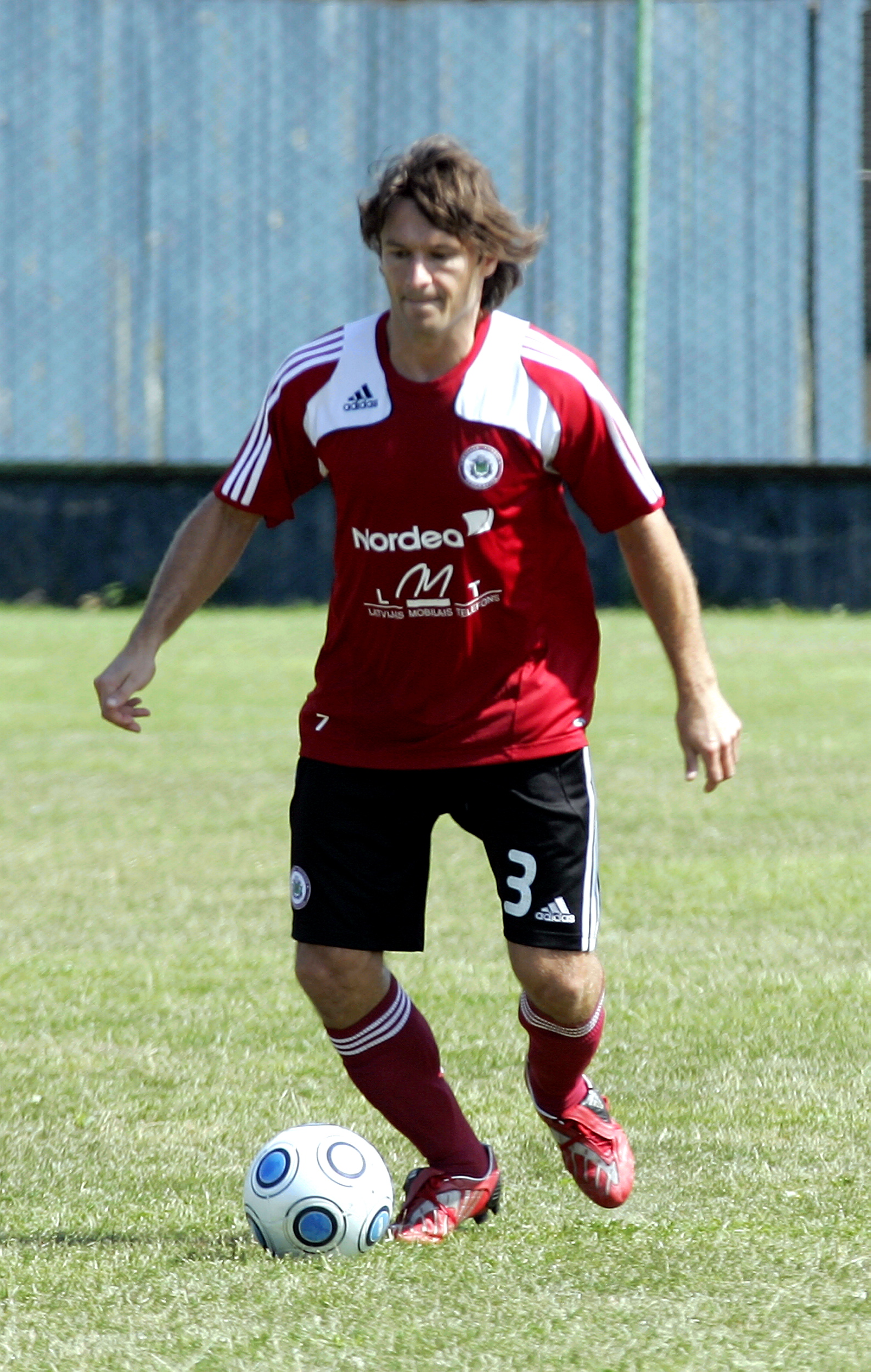
Vitālijs Astafjevs is Latvia's most capped player with 167 appearances.

Rank	Player	Caps	Goals	Period
1	Vitālijs Astafjevs	167	16	1992–2010
2	Andrejs Rubins	117	9	1998–2011
3	Juris Laizāns	113	15	1998–2013
4	Imants Bleidelis	106	10	1995–2007
5	Mihails Zemļinskis	105	12	1992–2005
6	Māris Verpakovskis	104	29	1999–2014
7	Igors Stepanovs	100	4	1995–2011
7	Andris Vaņins	100	0	2000–2019
9	Aleksandrs Koliņko	94	0	1997–2015
10	Kaspars Gorkšs	89	5	2005–2017

=== Top goalscorers ===
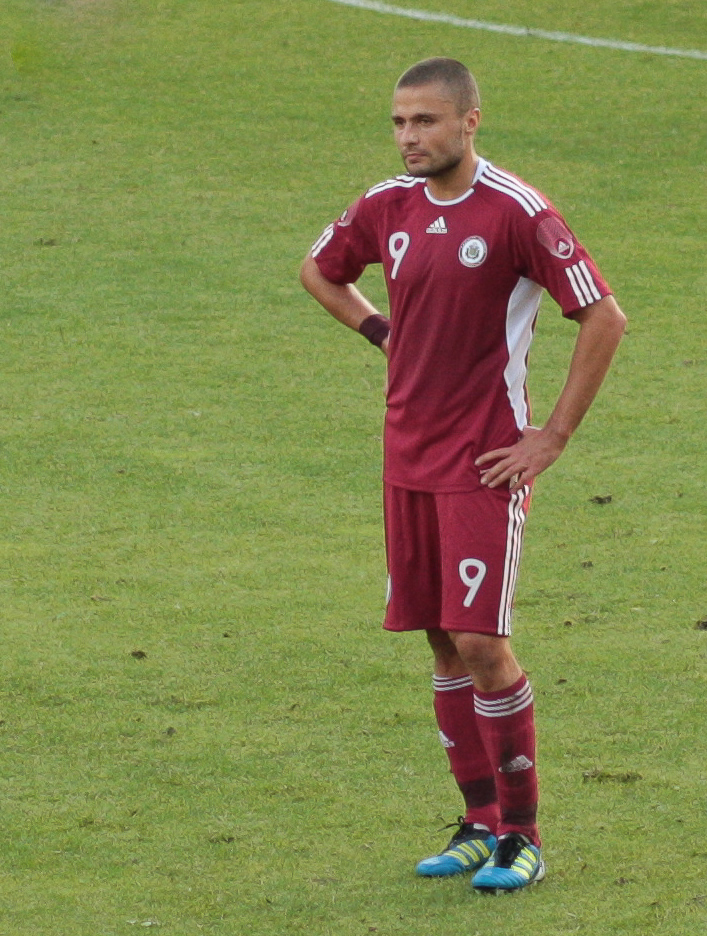
Māris Verpakovskis is Latvia's top scorer with 29 goals.

Rank	Player	Goals	Caps	Average	Period
1	Māris Verpakovskis	29	104	0.28	1999–2014
2	Ēriks Pētersons	24	63	0.38	1929–1939
3	Vitālijs Astafjevs	16	167	0.1	1992–2010
4	Marians Pahars	15	75	0.2	1996–2007
4	Juris Laizāns	15	113	0.13	1998–2013
6	Alberts Šeibelis	14	54	0.26	1925–1939
7	Iļja Vestermans	13	23	0.57	1935–1938
7	Valērijs Šabala	13	53	0.25	2013–2019
7	**Vladislavs Gutkovskis**	13	62	0.21	2016–present
10	Aleksandrs Cauņa	12	45	0.27	2007–2015
10	**Jānis Ikaunieks**	12	76	0.16	2014–present
10	Mihails Zemļinskis	12	105	0.11	1992–2005

=== Hat-tricks ===
Player	Competition	Against	Home/Away	Result	Date
Voldemārs Žins	International Friendly	Lithuania	Home	6–3	27 July 1927
Voldemārs Plade	1929 Baltic Cup	Lithuania	Home	3–1	14 August 1929
Ēriks Pētersons	1930 Baltic Cup	Lithuania	Away	3–3	17 August 1930
Ēriks Pētersons ^{4}	International Friendly	Lithuania	Home	5–2	30 June 1931
Ēriks Pētersons	International Friendly	Lithuania	Home	6–2	12 June 1933
Hugo Vītols	International Friendly	Lithuania	Home	6–1	30 May 1935
Fricis Kaņeps	1938 FIFA World Cup qualification	Lithuania	Home	4–2	29 July 1937

- ^{4} Player scored 4 goals

=== Clean sheets ===
Rank	Player	Games
1	Andris Vaņins	25
2	Aleksandrs Koliņko	21
3	Oļegs Karavajevs	13
4	Raimonds Laizāns	12
5	Arvīds Jurgens	5
5	Jānis Bebris	5
5	Pāvels Šteinbors	5
8	Jānis Kļaviņš	4
8	**Roberts Ozols**	4
10	Andrejs Piedels	2

== Competitive record ==
=== FIFA World Cup ===
FIFA World Cup record									Qualification record					
Year	Result	Position	Pld	W	D*	L	GF	GA	Pld	W	D	L	GF	GA
(Uruguay) 1930	Did not enter								Declined invitation					
(Italy) 1934	Did not enter								Did not enter					
(France) 1938	Did not qualify								3	2	0	1	10	5
(Brazil) 1950	Part of the Soviet Union								Part of the Soviet Union					
(Switzerland) 1954	Part of the Soviet Union								Part of the Soviet Union					
(Sweden) 1958	Part of the Soviet Union								Part of the Soviet Union					
(Chile) 1962	Part of the Soviet Union								Part of the Soviet Union					
(England) 1966	Part of the Soviet Union								Part of the Soviet Union					
(Mexico) 1970	Part of the Soviet Union								Part of the Soviet Union					
(West Germany) 1974	Part of the Soviet Union								Part of the Soviet Union					
(Argentina) 1978	Part of the Soviet Union								Part of the Soviet Union					
(Spain) 1982	Part of the Soviet Union								Part of the Soviet Union					
(Mexico) 1986	Part of the Soviet Union								Part of the Soviet Union					
(Italy) 1990	Part of the Soviet Union								Part of the Soviet Union					
(United States) 1994	Did not qualify								12	0	5	7	4	21
(France) 1998	Did not qualify								10	3	1	6	10	14
(South Korea) (Japan) 2002	Did not qualify								8	1	1	6	5	16
(Germany) 2006	Did not qualify								12	4	3	5	18	21
(South Africa) 2010	Did not qualify								10	5	2	3	18	15
(Brazil) 2014	Did not qualify								10	2	2	6	10	20
(Russia) 2018	Did not qualify								10	2	1	7	7	18
(Qatar) 2022	Did not qualify								10	2	3	5	11	14
(Canada) (Mexico) (United States) 2026	Did not qualify								8	1	2	5	5	15
(Morocco) (Portugal) (Spain) 2030	To be determined								To be determined					
(Saudi Arabia) 2034	To be determined								To be determined					
Total		0/12							93	22	20	51	98	159

=== UEFA European Championship ===
UEFA European Championship record										Qualifying record					
Year	Result	Position	Pld	W	D*	L	GF	GA	Squad	Pld	W	D	L	GF	GA
(France) 1960	Part of the Soviet Union									Part of the Soviet Union					
(Spain) 1964	Part of the Soviet Union									Part of the Soviet Union					
(Italy) 1968	Part of the Soviet Union									Part of the Soviet Union					
(Belgium) 1972	Part of the Soviet Union									Part of the Soviet Union					
(Socialist Federal Republic of Yugoslavia) 1976	Part of the Soviet Union									Part of the Soviet Union					
(Italy) 1980	Part of the Soviet Union									Part of the Soviet Union					
(France) 1984	Part of the Soviet Union									Part of the Soviet Union					
(West Germany) 1988	Part of the Soviet Union									Part of the Soviet Union					
(Sweden) 1992	Part of the Soviet Union									Part of the Soviet Union					
(England) 1996	Did not qualify									10	4	0	6	11	20
(Belgium) (Netherlands) 2000	Did not qualify									10	3	4	3	13	12
(Portugal) 2004	Group stage	14th	3	0	1	2	1	5	Squad	10	6	2	2	13	8
(Austria) (Switzerland) 2008	Did not qualify									12	4	0	8	15	17
(Poland) (Ukraine) 2012	Did not qualify									10	3	2	5	9	12
(France) 2016	Did not qualify									10	0	5	5	6	19
(Europe) 2020	Did not qualify									10	1	0	9	3	28
(Germany) 2024	Did not qualify									8	1	0	7	5	19
(United Kingdom) (Republic of Ireland) 2028	To be determined									To be determined					
(Italy) (Turkey) 2032	To be determined									To be determined					
Total	Group stage	1/8	3	0	1	2	1	5	—	80	22	13	45	75	135

=== UEFA Nations League ===
UEFA Nations League record
Season	Division	Group	Pld	W	D	L	GF	GA	P/R	RK
2018–19	D	1	6	0	4	2	2	6	Same position	51st
2020–21	D	1	6	1	4	1	8	4	Same position	53rd
2022–23	D	1	6	4	1	1	12	5	▲	50th
2024–25	C	4	8	3	1	4	6	11	Same position	45th
2026–27	C	2	6	0	2	4	3	8	Same position	47th
Total			32	8	12	12	31	34	45th	

=== Baltic Cup ===
Baltic Cup record
Year	Result	Position	Pld	W	D	L	GF	GA
1928	Champions	1st	2	2	0	0	4	0
1929	Runners-up	2nd	2	1	1	0	5	3
1930	Runners-up	2nd	2	1	1	0	6	5
1931	Runners-up	2nd	2	1	0	1	2	3
1932	Champions	1st	2	2	0	0	5	1
1933	Abandoned	1st	2	1	1	0	3	2
1935	Runners-up	2nd	2	0	2	0	3	3
1936	Champions	1st	2	2	0	0	4	2
1937	Champions	1st	2	1	1	0	6	2
1938	Runners-up	2nd	2	0	2	0	2	2
1991	Runners-up	2nd	2	1	1	0	3	1
1992	Runners-up	2nd	2	1	0	1	4	4
1993	Champions	1st	2	1	1	0	2	0
1994	Runners-up	2nd	2	1	0	1	2	1
1995	Champions	1st	2	2	0	0	4	0
1996	Third place	3rd	2	0	1	1	2	3
1997	Runners-up	2nd	2	1	0	1	2	2
1998	Runners-up	2nd	2	1	0	1	2	1
2001	Champions	1st	2	2	0	0	7	2
2003	Champions	1st	2	1	1	0	2	1
2005	Runners-up	2nd	1	0	0	1	0	2
2008	Champions	1st	2	2	0	0	3	1
2010	Runners-up	2nd	2	0	2	0	0	0
2012	Champions	1st	2	2	0	0	6	1
2014	Champions	1st	2	2	0	0	1	0
2016	Champions	1st	2	1	1	0	2	1
2018	Champions	1st	2	1	1	0	2	1
2020	Runners-up	2nd	2	1	0	1	4	3
2022	Runners-up	2nd	2	1	0	1	2	2
2024	Third place	3rd	2	1	0	1	1	2
2026	Fourth place	4th	2	0	1	1	1	2
Total	13 Titles	31/31	61	33	17	11	92	53

=== Olympic Games ===
Olympic Games record
Year	Result	Position	Pld	W	D	L	GF	GA	Squad
(France) 1924	Second round	15th	1	0	0	1	0	7	Squad
Total	Second round	1/1	1	0	0	1	0	7	—

== Head-to-head record ==
As of 5 October 2026 after match against Cyprus.

Opponent	Pld	W	D *	L	GF	GA	GD
Albania	7	0	6	1	7	8	–1
Andorra	13	8	5	0	26	4	+22
Angola	1	0	1	0	1	1	0
Armenia	7	2	1	4	7	10	–3
Austria	9	2	1	6	9	24	−15
Azerbaijan	6	1	4	1	4	5	−1
Bahrain	1	0	1	0	2	2	0
Belarus	6	1	1	4	7	13	−6
Belgium	2	0	0	2	1	7	−6
Bolivia	1	1	0	0	2	1	+1
Bosnia and Herzegovina	2	0	0	2	1	9	−8
Brazil	1	0	0	1	0	3	−3
Bulgaria	3	0	0	3	0	6	−6
China	1	0	0	1	0	1	−1
Croatia	6	0	0	6	1	17	−16
Cyprus	5	0	2	3	2	6	−4
Czech Republic	5	0	1	4	4	13	−9
Denmark	4	0	1	3	1	7	−6
England	2	0	0	2	0	8	−8
Estonia	61	28	22	11	95	63	+32
Faroe Islands	9	2	5	2	5	6	–1
Finland	17	4	3	10	18	32	−14
France	1	0	0	1	0	7	−7
Georgia	10	3	2	5	10	18	−8
Germany	4	0	1	3	2	13	−11
Ghana	1	0	0	1	0	1	−1
Gibraltar	6	5	0	1	13	3	+10
Greece	8	1	2	5	6	13	−7
Honduras	1	0	0	1	1	2	−1
Hungary	7	1	0	6	7	16	−9
Iceland	7	2	3	2	12	12	0
Israel	8	1	1	6	6	18	−12
Japan	2	0	1	1	2	5	−3
Kazakhstan	7	2	4	1	7	5	+2
Kosovo	1	0	0	1	3	4	−1
Kuwait	2	0	1	1	1	3	−2
Liechtenstein	12	9	2	1	19	5	+14
Lithuania	58	29	13	16	120	80	+40
Luxembourg	7	6	1	0	20	4	+16
Malta	7	3	1	3	8	5	+3
Moldova	5	3	0	2	11	9	+2
Montenegro	5	0	2	3	3	7	−4
Netherlands	5	0	0	5	0	14	−14
North Korea	2	1	1	0	3	2	+1
North Macedonia	6	0	1	5	2	11	−9
Northern Ireland	7	2	0	5	4	8	−4
Norway	4	1	1	2	4	5	-1
Oman	2	1	0	1	4	4	0
Poland	16	2	2	12	15	42	−27
Portugal	6	0	0	6	4	18	−14
Qatar	1	0	0	1	1	3	−2
Republic of Ireland	6	0	0	6	3	17	−14
Romania	5	0	1	4	0	9	−9
Russia	4	0	1	3	2	7	−5
San Marino	5	4	1	0	9	1	+8
Saudi Arabia	1	0	0	1	0	2	–2
Scotland	4	0	0	4	1	7	−6
Serbia	2	0	0	2	1	3	−2
Slovakia	5	0	3	2	5	9	−4
Slovenia	5	1	0	4	2	9	−7
South Korea	2	0	0	2	0	2	−2
Spain	4	0	1	3	0	9	−9
Sweden	17	2	4	11	12	54	−42
Switzerland	5	0	1	4	3	9	−6
Thailand	1	0	1	0	1	1	0
Tunisia	1	0	0	1	0	3	−3
Turkey	10	1	5	4	15	22	−7
Ukraine	3	0	1	2	1	3	−2
United States	1	0	0	1	0	1	−1
Uzbekistan	1	0	0	1	0	3	−3
Wales	3	0	0	3	0	5	−5
Total	436	121	107	208	505	715	−210

*Draws include knockout matches decided on penalty kicks.

== Honours ==
=== Regional ===
- Baltic Cup
  - Champions (13): 1928, 1932, 1936, 1937, 1993, 1995, 2001, 2003, 2008, 2012, 2014, 2016, 2018
  - Runners-up (14): 1929, 1930, 1931, 1935, 1938, 1991, 1992, 1994, 1997, 1998, 2005, 2010, 2020, 2022
  - Third place (2): 1996, 2024

=== Friendly ===
- King's Cup
  - Champions (1): 2005

== See also ==
- Latvia men's national under-21 football team
- Latvia men's national under-19 football team
- Latvia men's national under-17 football team
- Latvia women's national football team
- Latvia women's national under-17 football team
