= Latvia national under-19 football team =

National U-19 association football team

Latvia Under-19
- Nickname: Sarkanbaltsarkanie (The red-white-reds)
- Association: Latvian Football Federation
- Confederation: UEFA (Europe)
- Head coach: (Latvia) Viktors Dobrecovs
- Most caps: Aleksejs Saveļjevs (30)
- Top scorer: Raimonds Krollis (10)
| First colours | Second colours |

First international
- Republic of Ireland 3–0 Latvia (Cobh, Republic of Ireland; 5 November 2001)

Biggest win
- Gibraltar 0–8 Latvia (Riga, Latvia; 17 October 2023)

Biggest defeat
- England 7–0 Latvia (Raudondvaris, Lithuania; 15 November 2025)

The Latvia national under-19 football team is the national under-19 football team of Latvia and is controlled by the Latvian Football Federation.

The team competes in the UEFA European Under-19 Football Championship, held every year.

== Coaching staff ==
| Head coach | (Czech Republic) Jakub Dovalil |
| Assistant coach | (Latvia) Viktors Mazurs |
| Goalkeeping coach | (Latvia) Andris Vaņins |
| Doctor | (Latvia) Anatolijs Makejevs |
| Physiotherapist | (Latvia) Sergejs Pečņikovs |
| General Manager | (Latvia) Aivars Vaivods |

== Coaching history ==
- (Latvia) Jānis Dreimanis (2001 - 2003)
- (Latvia) Vladimirs Beļajevs (2003)
- (Latvia) Jānis Dreimanis (2004)
- (Latvia) Mihails Koņevs (2005 - 2006)
- (Latvia) Vladimirs Beškarevs (2006)
- (Latvia) Andrejs Karpovs (2007)
- (Latvia) Vladimirs Beļajevs (2008 - 2009)
- (Latvia) Anatolijs Čebans (2009)
- (Latvia) Jānis Dreimanis (2010)
- (Latvia) Viktors Vicehovskis (2011 - 2012)
- (Latvia) Vladimirs Babičevs (2012 - 2015)
- (Latvia) Aleksandrs Basovs (2015 - 2018)
- (Czech Republic) Jakub Dovalil (2019 - 2024)

== Players ==
=== Current squad ===
The following players were called up for the 2027 UEFA European Under-19 Championship qualification matches against Belarus, Slovakia and San Marino on 15, 18, and 21 May 2026; respectively.

| No. | Pos. | Player | Date of birth (age) | Club |
|---|---|---|---|---|
| 1 | GK | Nils Balagušs | 14 March 2008 (age 18) | (Italian Football Federation) Palermo |
| 12 | GK | Rendijs Mihelsons | 23 April 2008 (age 18) | (Italian Football Federation) Genoa |
| 2 | DF | Patriks Brūns (captain) | 9 September 2008 (age 18) | (Latvian Football Federation) FK Ventspils |
| 4 | DF | Alekss Kotlevs | 4 February 2008 (age 18) | (Football Association of Iceland) Augnablik |
| 13 | DF | Jegors Čugunovs | 29 July 2008 (age 18) | (Latvian Football Federation) Super Nova |
| 15 | DF | Fabio Rošā | 25 May 2009 (age 17) | (Latvian Football Federation) Super Nova |
| 6 | DF | Kristaps Rekmanis | 15 August 2008 (age 18) | (Latvian Football Federation) Super Nova |
| 5 | DF | Savēlijs Boroviks | 10 April 2008 (age 18) | (Latvian Football Federation) RFS |
| 14 | DF | Oskars Šulcs | 19 May 2009 (age 17) | (Royal Belgian Football Association) RWDM Brussels |
| 11 | MF | Markuss Gomins | 9 September 2008 (age 18) | (The Football Association) Fulham |
| 16 | MF | Rojs Bušs | 5 July 2008 (age 18) | (Latvian Football Federation) Valmiera |
| 18 | MF | Markuss Blaubergs | 10 February 2008 (age 18) | (Latvian Football Federation) Riga FC |
| 8 | MF | Miķelis Menniks | 22 May 2009 (age 17) | (Latvian Football Federation) Skanstes SK |
| 17 | FW | Olivers Dzenītis | 17 February 2008 (age 18) | (Latvian Football Federation) Metta |
| 7 | FW | Artjoms Butriks | 23 March 2008 (age 18) | (Royal Spanish Football Federation) Sevilla |
| 20 | FW | Aleks Ščerbinskis | 28 October 2009 (age 17) | (Latvian Football Federation) Skanstes SK |
| 9 | FW | Felikss Sproģis | 17 May 2008 (age 18) | (German Football Association) Hansa Rostock |
| | FW | Georgijs Bombāns | 10 August 2009 (age 17) | (Latvian Football Federation) Super Nova |
| 10 | FW | Marko Bajārs | 12 September 2009 (age 17) | (German Football Association) Hertha BSC |
| 19 | FW | Olivers Beķeris | 27 June 2008 (age 18) | (Latvian Football Federation) Skanstes SK |

=== Recent call-ups ===
The following players have also been called up for the team and are still available for selection.

| Pos. | Player | Date of birth (age) | Caps | Goals | Club | Latest call-up |
|---|---|---|---|---|---|---|
| GK | Mārcis Kazainis | 28 April 2007 (age 19) | 1 | 0 | (Latvia) Riga | v. Estonia, 10 June 2025 |
| GK | Kristers Gabriels Bite | 21 November 2006 (age 19) | 7 | 0 | (Latvia) Metta | v. Spain, 25 March 2025 |
| GK | Henrijs Auseklis | 19 December 2006 (age 19) | 5 | 0 | (Italy) Cagliari | v. Spain, 25 March 2025 |
| DF | Valters Liepājnieks | 24 May 2007 (age 19) | 6 | 0 | (Latvia) Ventspils | v. Malta, 7 September 2025 |
| DF | Gustavs Leitāns | 13 June 2007 (age 19) | 4 | 0 | (Latvia) Grobiņa | v. Malta, 7 September 2025 |
| DF | Jānis Emīls Kalpaks | 13 January 2007 (age 19) | 2 | 0 | (Latvia) JDFS Alberts | v. Estonia, 10 June 2025 |
| DF | Valters Purs | 19 February 2006 (age 20) | 16 | 1 | (Latvia) Jelgava | v. Spain, 25 March 2025 |
| DF | Kristofers Baumanis | 22 January 2006 (age 20) | 4 | 0 | (Italy) Nuova Sondrio | v. Spain, 25 March 2025 |
| DF | Timurs Azarovs | 23 March 2006 (age 20) | 0 | 0 | (Italy) Monza | v. Spain, 25 March 2025 |
| MF | Ratmirs Trifonovs | 4 August 2007 (age 19) | 2 | 0 | (Latvia) Riga Mariners | v. Malta, 7 September 2025 |
| MF | Ņikita Barkovskis | 9 June 2006 (age 20) | 13 | 0 | (Latvia) BFC Daugavpils | v. Spain, 25 March 2025 |
| MF | Hugo Jesse | 18 May 2006 (age 20) | 9 | 0 | (Latvia) Metta | v. Spain, 25 March 2025 |
| MF | Tomašs Mickēvičs | 25 January 2006 (age 20) | 6 | 2 | (Latvia) Grobiņa | v. Spain, 25 March 2025 |
| MF | Viktors Ohvovoriole | 14 November 2006 (age 19) | 6 | 0 | (Poland) Korona Kielce | v. Spain, 25 March 2025 |
| MF | Markuss Strods | 5 October 2006 (age 20) | 5 | 1 | (Republic of Ireland) Bohemians | v. Spain, 25 March 2025 |
| FW | Nils Veinbergs | 20 July 2007 (age 19) | 13 | 4 | (Finland) TPS | v. Denmark, 28 March 2026 |
| FW | Maksims Kopilovs | 14 December 2007 (age 18) | 1 | 0 | (Latvia) BFC Daugavpils | v. Malta, 7 September 2025 |
| FW | Markuss Ivulāns | 19 August 2006 (age 20) | 19 | 1 | (Latvia) Metta | v. Spain, 25 March 2025 |
| FW | Daniels Radzenieks | 22 July 2006 (age 20) | 5 | 2 | (Ukraine) Polissya Zhytomyr | v. Spain, 25 March 2025 |

== See also ==
- Latvia football team
- Latvia U-21
- Latvia U-17
