= Latvia national under-21 football team =

Latvia Under-21
- Nickname: Sarkanbaltsarkanie (The red-white-reds)
- Association: Latvian Football Federation
- Confederation: UEFA (Europe)
- Head coach: (Latvia) Aleksandrs Basovs
- Captain: Ivans Patrikejevs
- Most caps: Endijs Šlampe, Reinis Flaksis (31)
- Top scorer: Edgars Gauračs (10)
| First colours | Second colours |

First international
- Latvia 0–0 Lithuania (Vilnius, Lithuania; 28 October 1992)

Biggest win
- Latvia 4–0 Estonia (Carnikava, Latvia; 28 April 1994); Latvia 4–0 Andorra (Riga, Latvia; 6 June 2009); Latvia 5–1 Romania (Riga, Latvia; 9 October 2009); Turkmenistan 0–4 Latvia (Saint Petersburg, Russia; 26 January 2013); Latvia 4–0 Liechtenstein (Jūrmala, Latvia; 11 June 2013)

Biggest defeat
- Norway 7–0 Latvia (Drammen, Norway; 12 September 2023)

The Latvia national under-21 football team represents the under-21s of Latvia and is controlled by the Latvian Football Federation, the governing body of football in Latvia. The team competes in the UEFA European Under-21 Championship, held every two years. The team is coached by Aleksandrs Basovs and is currently captained by defender Daniels Balodis.

Following the realignment of UEFA's youth competitions in 1976, under-21 football teams in Europe were formed, while Latvian team was formed only in 1991, after regaining independence from the USSR. The team is exclusively for football players that are aged 21 or under at the start of the two-year campaign of the UEFA European Under-21 Championship meaning a player can represent the national team until the age of 23. Many U-21 players later represent the senior side.

Latvia U-21 have never yet qualified for the European U-21 championships, but has produced many players, who have become regular internationals for the senior side. Oskars Kļava, Deniss Ivanovs, Edgars Gauračs and Artjoms Rudņevs have all played for the U-21 side and are now first eleven players for Latvia internationally.

Latvia U-21 team plays its home matches at the Skonto stadions, which is also the home stadium of Latvia senior side. Before the opening of the Skonto stadions the team played its home matches in many different venues all around the country, including Ozolnieki, Daugavpils and Liepāja.

== History ==
As a team, Latvia U-21 was formed in 1992, after regaining independence from the USSR. The team played its first match in Vilnius, Lithuania on October 28, 1992 that ended in a 0-0 draw. The team firstly participated in the European Championship qualification in 1994, playing the first match in Riga against Ireland U-21 on September 6, that ended in a 1-1 draw. Since 2001 the team also participates in the Baltic Cup, winning in 2008. Since 1992 Latvia have already played more than 100 matches.

== UEFA European Under-21 Football Championship ==
- 1978 to 1992 - see Soviet Union

=== 2025 UEFA European Under-21 Championship qualification ===
| Pos | Team | Pld | W | D | L | GF | GA | GD | Pts | Qualification | Italy | Norway | Ireland | Turkey | Latvia | San Marino |
|---|---|---|---|---|---|---|---|---|---|---|---|---|---|---|---|---|
| 1 | Italy | 10 | 6 | 4 | 0 | 27 | 4 | +23 | 22 | Final tournament | — | 2–0 | 1–1 | 1–1 | 2–0 | 7–0 |
| 2 | Norway | 10 | 6 | 1 | 3 | 28 | 11 | +17 | 19 (Note: Head-to-head points: Norway 4, Republic of Ireland 1.) | Play-offs | 0–3 | — | 3–2 | 5–1 | 7–0 | 4–0 |
| 3 | Republic of Ireland | 10 | 5 | 4 | 1 | 24 | 12 | +12 | 19 | | 2–2 | 1–1 | — | 3–2 | 2–2 | 3–0 |
| 4 | Turkey | 10 | 4 | 1 | 5 | 21 | 15 | +6 | 13 | | 0–2 | 2–0 | 0–1 | — | 3–0 | 5–0 |
| 5 | Latvia | 10 | 3 | 2 | 5 | 10 | 18 | −8 | 11 | | 0–0 | 0–1 | 1–2 | 2–1 | — | 2–0 |
| 6 | San Marino | 10 | 0 | 0 | 10 | 1 | 51 | −50 | 0 | | 0–7 | 0–7 | 0–7 | 1–6 | 0–3 | — |

Source: UEFA
Legend: Blue = home team win; Yellow = draw; Red = away team win.
Rules for classification: Tiebreakers

== Results and fixtures ==
Win Draw Loss

== Players ==
=== Current squad ===
The following players were called up for the 2025 UEFA European Under-21 Championship qualification matches against Georgia and Greece on 10 and 14 October 2025; respectively.

Caps and goals correct as of 9 September 2025, after the match against Germany

| No. | Pos. | Player | Date of birth (age) | Caps | Goals | Club |
|---|---|---|---|---|---|---|
| | GK | Ņikita Parfjonovs | 5 February 2004 (age 22) | 2 | 0 | (Latvian Football Federation) Tukums 2000 |
| | GK | Ņikita Pinčuks | 4 January 2004 (age 22) | 0 | 0 | (Latvian Football Federation) Grobiņa |
| | GK | Dāvis Veisbuks | 1 March 2005 (age 21) | 0 | 0 | (Latvian Football Federation) Super Nova |
| | DF | Gļebs Mihaļcovs | 15 March 2004 (age 22) | 4 | 0 | (Latvian Football Federation) BFC Daugavpils |
| | DF | Daniels Nosegbe-Suško | 14 September 2004 (age 22) | 3 | 0 | (Georgian Football Federation) Samtredia |
| | DF | Milāns Tihonovičs | 30 December 2005 (age 20) | 3 | 0 | (Latvian Football Federation) Super Nova |
| | DF | Alans Kangars | 7 October 2005 (age 21) | 2 | 0 | (Latvian Football Federation) Metta |
| | DF | Ralfs Kragliks | 6 February 2004 (age 22) | 2 | 0 | (Latvian Football Federation) Auda |
| | DF | Maksims Semeško | 19 February 2004 (age 22) | 2 | 0 | (Latvian Football Federation) Tukums 2000 |
| | DF | Aleksandrs Molotkovs | 11 August 2007 (age 19) | 0 | 0 | (Latvian Football Federation) Metta |
| | MF | Ivans Patrikejevs | 31 August 2005 (age 21) | 6 | 1 | (Estonian Football Association) Nõmme Kalju |
| | MF | Gļebs Žaleiko | 27 June 2004 (age 22) | 4 | 0 | (Latvian Football Federation) Jelgava |
| | MF | Kevins Cēsnieks | 6 March 2005 (age 21) | 2 | 0 | (Latvian Football Federation) Metta |
| | MF | Ralfs Šitjakovs | 21 September 2004 (age 22) | 1 | 0 | (Latvian Football Federation) Super Nova |
| | MF | Markuss Strods | 5 October 2006 (age 20) | 1 | 0 | (Football Association of Ireland) Bohemians |
| | MF | Roberts Bočs | 3 July 2006 (age 20) | 0 | 0 | (Italian Football Federation) Pisa |
| | MF | Kristers Volkovs | 1 August 2004 (age 22) | 0 | 0 | (Latvian Football Federation) Tukums 2000 |
| | FW | Gļebs Patika | 9 November 2004 (age 21) | 8 | 1 | (Slovak Football Association) Tatran Prešov |
| | FW | Valerijs Lizunovs | 24 February 2004 (age 22) | 7 | 0 | (Latvian Football Federation) BFC Daugavpils |
| | FW | Ruslans Deružinskis | 27 July 2004 (age 22) | 2 | 0 | (Latvian Football Federation) Jelgava |
| | FW | Emīls Evelons | 1 June 2005 (age 21) | 2 | 0 | (Latvian Football Federation) Metta |
| | FW | Dannī Aņisjko | 11 January 2006 (age 20) | 1 | 0 | (The Football Association) Nottingham Forest |
| | FW | Ēriks Boroduška | 20 May 2005 (age 21) | 1 | 0 | (Latvian Football Federation) Jelgava |

=== Recent call-ups ===
The following players have also been called up within the last twelve months and remain eligible.

| Pos. | Player | Date of birth (age) | Caps | Goals | Club | Latest call-up |

== Staff ==
| Head coach | (Latvia) Aleksandrs Basovs |
| Assistant coach | (Latvia) Aleksandrs Jeļisejevs |
| Assistant coach | (Latvia) Sergejs Golubevs |
| Goalkeeping coach | (Latvia) Andrejs Piedels |
| Physiotherapist | (Latvia) Sergejs Pečņikovs |
| Doctor | (Latvia) Oļegs Samoiļenko |
| Manager | (Latvia) Didzis Matīss |

== Coaching history ==
- (Latvia) Aleksandrs Starkovs (1994)
- (Latvia) Jurijs Andrejevs (1995)
- (Latvia) Jānis Dreimanis (1996–1998)
- (Latvia) Jurijs Andrejevs (1998–2001)
- (Latvia) Jurijs Popkovs (2001–2003)
- (Latvia) Jurijs Ševļakovs (2004–2005)
- (Latvia) Genādijs Šitiks (2006–2009)
- (Latvia) Mihails Zemļinskis (2009–2011)
- (Netherlands) Anton Joore (2012–2013)
- (Latvia) Marians Pahars (2013)
- (Latvia) Dainis Kazakevičs (2013–2019)
- (Latvia) Aleksandrs Basovs (2020-)

== Most capped players ==
Only official matches against U-21 national teams, not including against clubs or any other matches.

| # | Name | Career | Caps | Goals |
|---|---|---|---|---|
| 1. | Endijs Šlampe | 2014–2016 | 31 | 0 |
| 1. | Reinis Flaksis | 2013–2016 | 31 | 1 |
| 3. | Dmitrijs Klimaševičs | 2014–2016 | 30 | 4 |
| 4. | Andrejs Kiriļins | 2014–2016 | 29 | 0 |
| 4. | Vladislavs Gutkovskis | 2014–2016 | 29 | 6 |
| 4. | Antonijs Černomordijs | 20??–2018 | 29 | 1 |
| 7. | Jevgēņijs Kazačoks | 20??–2016 | 27 | 5 |
| 7. | Eduards Tīdenbergs | 20??–2016 | 27 | 2 |
| 9. | Edgars Vardanjans | 2011–2014 | 25 | 1 |
| 9. | Kaspars Svārups | 20??–2016 | 25 | 3 |

Players in bold are still available to play for the U-21 National team.

== Best goalscorers ==
| # | Name | Career | Caps | Goals |
|---|---|---|---|---|
| 1. | Edgars Gauračs | 2009–2009 | 9 | 10 |
| 2. | Deniss Rakels | 2011–2013 | 13 | 6 |
| 2. | Vladislavs Gutkovskis | 2014–2016 | 29 | 6 |
| 4. | Jevgēņijs Kazačoks | 2013–2016 | 27 | 5 |
| 4. | Marko Regža | 2018- | 14 | 5 |
| 6. | Artjoms Rudņevs | 2009–2009 | 10 | 4 |
| 6. | Dmitrijs Klimaševičs | 2014–2016 | 30 | 4 |

== See also ==
- Latvia football team
- Latvia U-19
- Latvia U-17
