= Fricis Kaņeps =

Latvian footballer

Personal information
- Full name: Voldemārs Fricis Kaņeps
- Date of birth: 10 August 1916
- Place of birth: Ventspils, Russian Empire
- Date of death: 30 November 1981 (aged 65)
- Place of death: Staicele, Latvian SSR
- Position: Forward

Senior career*
Years	Team	Apps	(Gls)
1932–1935	Ventspils Spars		
1936	Olimpija Liepāja		(12)
1937–1940	RFK		(39)
1940	FK Dinamo Riga		
1941	RGK Riga		
1942	RFK		

International career
1937–1940	Latvia	12	(7)
- * Club domestic league appearances and goals

Fricis Kaņeps (10 August 1916, in Ventspils – 30 November 1981, in Staicele) was a Latvian footballer. He was one of the most powerful Latvian forwards of the 1930s who didn't have a very good technique but compensated it mostly by his physical strength. In earlier years when still playing in Ventspils Kaņeps also played in defence.

== Biography ==
Fricis Kaņeps was the most notable footballer from Ventspils in the era between the two world wars. The first club that he played for was Ventspils Spars, one of the strongest sides in Kurzeme at the time. Before the 1936 he moved to Liepāja to play with the best football club in Latvia outside Riga - Olimpija Liepāja. This was a serious step in forward for Kaņeps and the year which he spent with Olimpija was a very productive one. Olimpija won the Latvian Higher League title and Kaņeps was the club's best goalscorer with 12 league goals (just one less than the overall leader Aleksandrs Vanags).

After just one season with Olimpija Kaņeps moved to Riga where he joined the strongest local side - RFK. In the first year with RFK Kaņeps scored 11 league goals, a tally which he could have improved had he not gotten ill before the end of the season.

Kaņeps played with RFK until its dissolution in 1940. Over the four years with the club he won his second Latvian league title and became a two-time winner of the Latvian Cup, scoring 39 league goals over 3 seasons. In addition to good success with the club since 1937 he became a regular selection for the Latvia national football team. He made his international début in a 1937 friendly against Germany alongside his main competitor as the best goalscorer in the Latvian league Aleksandrs Vanags. In 1937 Kaņeps was a member of the Latvian team that won the Baltic Cup, he also scored several goals for Latvia in world cup qualifiers against Lithuania.

In 1940 after RFK was disbanded Kaņeps played with Dinamo Riga, the next year - with RGK Riga. In 1942 he played with the reformed RFK.

In 1945 Kaņeps was arrested and deported to Siberia. After his return to Latvia he lived and played football in Staicele where he lived until his death in 1981.

== Honours ==
Club Titles

- Latvian Higher League: 1936 (Olimpija Liepāja), 1940 (RFK)
- Latvian Cup: 1937 (RFK), 1939 (RFK)

National Team

- Baltic Cup: 1937
