= Aleksandrs Vanags =

Latvian footballer and basketball player

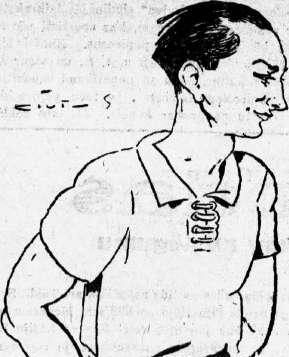
- Portrait of Aleksandrs Vanags in 1938.

Personal information
- Full name: Aleksandrs Vanags
- Date of birth: 1919
- Place of birth: Rīga, Latvia
- Date of death: 1986 (aged 66–67)
- Position: Midfielder

Senior career*
Years	Team	Apps	(Gls)
1937–1940	ASK Rīga	61	(18)
1946–1947	Strasbourg	5	(1)
1947–1949	FC Nancy	21	(2)
1949–1955	Strasbourg	129	(13)
Total		216	(34)

International career
1937–1940	Latvia	13	(9)
Medal record
Aleksandrs Vanags
Medal record
Representing Latvia
Men's basketball
European Championships
Silver medal – second place	1939 Lithuania	Team competition
- * Club domestic league appearances and goals

Aleksandrs Vanags (21 March 1919 – 1986), also known as Alexandre Vanags, was a Latvian football and basketball player. At international level, he represented the Latvia national football team, after World War II he played football in France.

== Biography ==
A midfielder, Vanags made his debut with Universitātes Sports before moving to ASK Rīga. He scored 9 goals for Latvia in 18 matches (from 1937 to 1939). In addition to football Vanags also played basketball for Latvia on an international level, he was silver medalist of EuroBasket 1939. In 1942 during German occupation of Latvia Vanags as a player with ASK won the Latvian league title.

After the Second World War Vanags settled in France where he joined RC Strasbourg. For two seasons he played also with FC Nancy but then returned to Strasbourg. In 140 matches with RC Strasbourg Vanags scored 10 goals. In 1951 Vanags won the Coupe de France with RC Strasbourg.

Later Vanags took up coaching football and basketball.
