= Sergejs Maģers =

Latvian footballer

Sergejs Maģers (1912–1989) was a Latvian footballer who played for Latvia national football team in late 1930s.

Maģers was noticed when playing for Rīgas FK in Rēzekne and soon he was invited to play in the Latvia national team. Sergejs Maģers played 20 in international matches for Latvia in midfield together with Jānis Lidmanis and Ēriks Pētersons.
