= Jānis Dreimanis =

Latvian footballer

Jānis Dreimanis (born 13 October 1949, Riga) is a Latvian former football defender.

In his career, he played 115 matches for Daugava Rīga, scoring four goals.

== Playing career ==
Dreimanis' first steps in football were made with Darba Rezerves in Riga, where at the time worked the famous former Latvian footballer Alfons Jēgers. First senior club - Enerģija Rīga in the Latvian league, then he played for ASK Rīga for 2 years. In 1971, he joined Zvejnieks Liepāja, which played on a higher level than his previous teams - in the Soviet second league. In 1972, he got transferred to Daugava Rīga.

His best season with Daugava was in 1974 when Daugava played in the second division playoffs, and Dreimanis had a strong shot and often scored goals from a far distance. He also played well with the head but lacked speed to play on a higher level.

After five years with Daugava Dreimanis returned to the Latvian league where he played for Elektrons Rīga (later - Alfa). With Elektrons he won the Latvian Cup 3 times and also won the league 3 times.

== Coaching career ==
His first club as manager was Alfa Rīga where he previously had been a player. In 1985 with Dreimanis in command Alfa won the Latvian league title. After five years as the general manager of Alfa he worked as a coach of youth squads for Pārdaugava Rīga and Gemma Rīga.

Dreimanis has worked with all Latvia national youth football teams - from U16 to U21. In 2005, he was the manager of the Latvian Higher League team JFK Olimps. On 20 December 2012 Dreimanis was appointed as the manager of the Latvian Higher League club FK Jelgava, but on 2 January 2013 he suffered an attack caused by a stroke and was hospitalized. His assistant Sergejs Golubevs was appointed as the new manager of the club.
