= Jānis Lidmanis =

Latvian footballer and basketball player

- Jānis Lidmanis, possibly in 1935

Personal information
- Born: 18 January 1910 Riga, Russian Empire
- Died: 29 November 1986 (aged 76) Melbourne, Australia
Medal record
Representing Latvia
European Championships
Gold medal – first place	1935 Switzerland	Team competition

Jānis Lidmanis (18 January 1910 – 29 November 1986) was a Latvian footballer and basketballer.

== Career ==
In the 1930s he was the captain of Latvia national football team for which he made 55 appearances (second result in the pre-war Latvian team) and scored 2 goals.

Lidmanis played of the football club Rīgas FK, the top Riga club of that era, and together with Ēriks Pētersons and Sergejs Maģers he made up the center midfield in the national team. One of his strengths was in the hands (he also played basketball and even played for Latvia in EuroBasket 1935), he also performed corner-kicks.

In 1944, Lidmanis together with his family immigrated to Germany and in 1949 to Australia. He died in Melbourne, Australia, on 29 November 1986.
