= Latvia national football team results (2020–present) =

- Win Draw Loss

This article provides details of international football games played by the Latvia national football team from 2020 to present.

== Results ==
Key
Win
Draw
Defeat

=== 2020 ===
3 September 2020 2020–21 Nations League	Latvia	0–0	Andorra	Riga, Latvia
19:00 UTC+3		Report		Stadium: Daugava Stadium; Attendance: 0 (Note: Due to the COVID-19 pandemic in Europe, all matches scheduled for September 2020 were played behind closed doors.); Referee: Timotheos Christofi (Cyprus)

6 September 2020 2020–21 Nations League	Malta	1–1	Latvia	Ta' Qali, Malta
20:45 UTC+2	Nwoko 15'	Report	Guillaumier 25' (o.g.)	Stadium: National Stadium; Attendance: 0 Referee: Stéphanie Frappart (France)

7 October 2020 Friendly	Montenegro	1–1	Latvia	Podgorica, Montenegro
20:45 UTC+2	Ivanović 90+1'	Report	Tarasovs 26'	Stadium: Podgorica City Stadium; Attendance: 0 Referee: Admir Šehović (Bosnia and Herzegovina)
Note: Match originally scheduled for 26 March 2020, but postponed due to a spike in COVID-19 cases.

10 October 2020 2020–21 Nations League	Faroe Islands	1–1	Latvia	Tórshavn, Faroe Islands
17:00 UTC+1	Færø 28'	Report	J. Ikaunieks 25'	Stadium: Tórsvøllur; Attendance: 447; Referee: Ivaylo Stoyanov (Bulgaria)

13 October 2020 2020–21 Nations League	Latvia	0–1	Malta	Riga, Latvia
21:45 UTC+3		Report	Borg 90+7'	Stadium: Daugava Stadium; Attendance: 953; Referee: Iwan Arwel Griffith (Wales)

11 November 2020 Friendly	San Marino	0–3	Latvia	Serravalle, San Marino
18:00 UTC+1		Report	Brolli 32' (o.g.); Dubra 71'; Gutkovskis 78' (pen.)	Stadium: San Marino Stadium; Attendance: 0 Referee: Fabio Maresca (Italy)
Note: Match originally scheduled for 31 March 2020, but postponed due to a spike in COVID-19 cases.

14 November 2020 2020–21 Nations League	Latvia	1–1	Faroe Islands	Riga, Latvia
19:00 UTC+2	Kamešs 59'	Report	G. Vatnhamar 60'	Stadium: Daugava Stadium; Attendance: 0 Referee: Nikola Dabanović (Montenegro)

17 November 2020 2020–21 Nations League	Andorra	0–5	Latvia	Andorra la Vella, Andorra
20:45 UTC+1		Report	Černomordijs 6'; J. Ikaunieks 57', 60'; Gutkovskis 70' (pen.); Krollis 90' (pen.)	Stadium: Estadi Nacional; Attendance: 0 Referee: Dimitar Meckarovski (North Macedonia)

=== 2021 ===
24 March 2021 2022 FIFA World Cup qualification	Latvia	1–2	Montenegro	Riga, Latvia
21:45 UTC+3	J. Ikaunieks 40'	Report	Jovetić 41', 83'	Stadium: Skonto Stadium; Attendance: 0 Referee: Alain Durieux (Luxembourg)

27 March 2021 2022 FIFA World Cup qualification	Netherlands	2–0	Latvia	Amsterdam, Netherlands
20:45 UTC+2	Berghuis 32'; L. de Jong 69'	Report		Stadium: Johan Cruyff Arena; Attendance: 0 Referee: Stéphanie Frappart (France)

30 March 2021 2022 FIFA World Cup qualification	Turkey	3–3	Latvia	Istanbul, Turkey
21:45 UTC+3	Karaman 2'; Çalhanoğlu 33'; Yılmaz 52' (pen.)	Report	Savaļnieks 35'; Uldriķis 58'; Ikaunieks 79'	Stadium: Atatürk Olympic Stadium; Attendance: 0 Referee: Daniel Stefański (Poland)

4 June 2021 2020 Baltic Cup	Latvia	3–1	Lithuania	Riga, Latvia
19:00 UTC+3	Beneta 37' (o.g.); Emsis 69'; Uldriķis 85'	Report	Golubickas 67'	Stadium: Daugava Stadium; Attendance: 0 Referee: Juri Frischer (Estonia)

7 June 2021 Friendly	Germany	7–1	Latvia	Düsseldorf, Germany
20:45 UTC+2	Gosens 19'; Gündoğan 21'; Müller 27'; Ozols 39' (o.g.); Gnabry 45'; Werner 50'; Sané 76'	Report	Saveljevs 75'	Stadium: Merkur Spiel-Arena; Attendance: 1,000; Referee: Nikola Dabanović (Montenegro)

10 June 2021 2020 Baltic Cup	Estonia	2–1	Latvia	Tallinn, Estonia
18:00 UTC+3	Käit 5', 40'	Report	Ikaunieks 84' (pen.)	Stadium: Lilleküla Stadium; Attendance: 740; Referee: Robertas Valikonis (Latvia)

1 September 2021 2022 FIFA World Cup qualification	Latvia	3–1	Gibraltar	Riga, Latvia
21:45 UTC+3	Gutkovskis 50' (pen.), 85'; Cigaņiks 89'	Report	De Barr 71' (pen.)	Stadium: Daugava Stadium; Attendance: 1,466; Referee: Pavel Orel (Czech Republic)

4 September 2021 2022 FIFA World Cup qualification	Latvia	0–2	Norway	Riga, Latvia
19:00 UTC+3		Report	Haaland 20' (pen.); M. Elyounoussi 66'	Stadium: Daugava Stadium; Attendance: 2,520; Referee: David Fuxman (Israel)

7 September 2021 2022 FIFA World Cup qualification	Montenegro	0–0	Latvia	Podgorica, Montenegro
20:45 UTC+2		Report		Stadium: City Stadium; Attendance: 2,134; Referee: Harm Osmers (Germany)

8 October 2021 2022 FIFA World Cup qualification	Latvia	0–1	Netherlands	Riga, Latvia
21:45 UTC+3		Report	Klaassen 19'	Stadium: Daugava Stadium; Attendance: 4,711; Referee: Andrew Madley (England)

11 October 2021 2022 FIFA World Cup qualification	Latvia	1–2	Turkey	Riga, Latvia
21:45 UTC+3	Demiral 70' (o.g.)	Report	Dursun 76'; Yılmaz 90+9' (pen.)	Stadium: Daugava Stadium; Attendance: 2,453; Referee: Andreas Ekberg (Sweden)

13 November 2021 2022 FIFA World Cup qualification	Norway	0–0	Latvia	Oslo, Norway
18:00 UTC+1		Report		Stadium: Ullevaal Stadion; Attendance: 24,376; Referee: Lawrence Visser (Belgium)

16 November 2021 2022 FIFA World Cup qualification	Gibraltar	1–3	Latvia	Gibraltar
20:45 UTC+1	Walker 7'	Report	Gutkovskis 25'; Uldriķis 55'; Krollis 75'	Stadium: Victoria Stadium; Attendance: 1,130; Referee: Espen Eskås (Norway)

=== 2022 ===
25 March 2022 Friendly	Latvia	1–1	Kuwait	Ta'Qali, Malta
13:00 UTC+2	Savaļnieks 55'	Report	Al-Mutawa 12'	Stadium: Ta'Qali National Stadium; Referee: Matthew De Gabriele (Malta)

29 March 2022 Friendly	Azerbaijan	0–1	Latvia	Ta'Qali, Malta
13:00 UTC+2		Report	Gutkovskis 85'	Stadium: Ta'Qali National Stadium; Referee: Trustin Farrugia Cann (Malta)

3 June 2022 2022–23 Nations League	Latvia	3–0	Andorra	Riga, Latvia
19:00 UTC+3	Uldriķis 9', 77'; Ikaunieks 85' (pen.)	Report		Stadium: Daugava Stadium; Attendance: 5,863; Referee: Tomasz Musiał (Poland)

6 June 2022 2022–23 Nations League	Latvia	1–0	Liechtenstein	Riga, Latvia
19:00 UTC+3	Zjuzins 73'	Report		Stadium: Daugava Stadium; Attendance: 5,966; Referee: Mario Zebec (Croatia)

10 June 2022 2022–23 Nations League	Moldova	2–4	Latvia	Chișinău, Moldova
19:00 UTC+3	Nicolaescu 5' (pen.); Moțpan 64'	Report	Gutkovskis 19', 60'; J. Ikaunieks 26', 75'	Stadium: Zimbru Stadium; Attendance: 4,842; Referee: Andrew Madley (England)

14 June 2022 2022–23 Nations League	Liechtenstein	0–2	Latvia	Vaduz, Liechtenstein
20:45 UTC+2		Report	Gutkovskis 20', 28'	Stadium: Rheinpark Stadion; Attendance: 885; Referee: Aleksandar Stavrev (North Macedonia)

22 September 2022 2022–23 Nations League	Latvia	1–2	Moldova	Riga, Latvia
21:45 UTC+3	J. Ikaunieks 55'	Report	Revenco 26'; Nicolaescu 45'	Stadium: Daugava Stadium; Attendance: 6,711; Referee: António Nobre (Portugal)

25 September 2022 2022–23 Nations League	Andorra	1–1	Latvia	Andorra la Vella, Andorra
15:00 UTC+2	Rosas 88'	Report	Gutkovskis 50'	Stadium: Estadi Nacional; Attendance: 1,102; Referee: Anastasios Papapetrou (Greece)

16 November 2022 2022 Baltic Cup	Latvia	1–1 (5–3 p)	Estonia	Riga, Latvia
19:00 UTC+2	Krollis 45+2'	Report	Zenjov 2'	Stadium: Daugava Stadium; Attendance: 1,657; Referee: Robertas Valikonis (Lithuania)
	Penalties
	J. Ikaunieks (penalty scored); Zjuzins (penalty scored); Jaunzems (penalty scored); D. Ikaunieks (penalty scored); Stuglis (penalty scored)		(penalty scored) Mets; (penalty scored) Vassiljev; (penalty missed) Zenjov; (penalty scored) Sorga

19 November 2022 2022 Baltic Cup	Latvia	1–1 (7–8 p)	Iceland	Riga, Latvia
16:00 UTC+2	Cigaņiks 67'	Report	Jóhannesson 62' (pen.)	Stadium: Daugava Stadium; Attendance: 997; Referee: Joonas Jaanovits (Estonia)
	Penalties
	J. Ikaunieks (penalty scored); Zjuzins (penalty scored); D. Ikaunieks (penalty scored); Jaunzems (penalty scored); Stuglis (penalty scored); Sorokins (penalty scored); Cigaņiks (penalty scored); Černomordijs (penalty missed)		(penalty scored) Jóhannesson; (penalty scored) S. Guðjohnsen; (penalty scored) Helgason; (penalty scored) Sigurðsson; (penalty scored) Þórðarson; (penalty scored) Þrándarson; (penalty scored) Ellertsson; (penalty scored) Grétarsson

=== 2023 ===
22 March 2023 Friendly	Republic of Ireland	3–2	Latvia	Dublin, Ireland
19:45 UTC+1	O'Dowda 6'; Ferguson 17'; Ogbene 65'	Report	Uldriķis 33'; Zjuzins 45+1'	Stadium: Aviva Stadium; Attendance: 41,211; Referee: Andrei Chivulete (Romania)

28 March 2023 UEFA Euro 2024 qualifying	Wales	1–0	Latvia	Cardiff, Wales
19:45 UTC+1	Moore 41'	Report		Stadium: Cardiff City Stadium; Attendance: 32,806; Referee: Giorgi Kruashvili (Georgia)

16 June 2023 UEFA Euro 2024 qualifying	Latvia	2–3	Turkey	Riga, Latvia
21:45 UTC+3	Emsis 51'; Tobers 90+4'	Report	Bardakci 23'; Ünder 61'; Kahveci 90+5'	Stadium: Skonto Stadium; Attendance: 6,287; Referee: Tamás Bognár (Hungary)

19 June 2023 UEFA Euro 2024 qualifying	Armenia	2–1	Latvia	Yerevan, Armenia
20:00 UTC+4	Tiknizyan 35'; Barseghyan 90+1' (pen.)	Report	Mkrtchyan 67' (o.g.)	Stadium: Vazgen Sargsyan Republican Stadium; Attendance: 13,450; Referee: Peter Kralović (Slovakia)

8 September 2023 UEFA Euro 2024 qualifying	Croatia	5–0	Latvia	Rijeka, Croatia
20:45 UTC+2	Petković 3', 44'; Ivanušec 13'; Kramarić 68'; Pašalić 78'	Report		Stadium: Stadion Rujevica; Attendance: 8,152; Referee: Philip Farrugia (Malta)

11 September 2023 UEFA Euro 2024 qualifying	Latvia	0–2	Wales	Riga, Latvia
20:45 UTC+3		Report	Ramsey 29' (pen.); Brooks 90+6'	Stadium: Skonto Stadium; Attendance: 6,464; Referee: Michal Ocenáš (Slovakia)

12 October 2023 UEFA Euro 2024 qualifying	Latvia	2–0	Armenia	Riga, Latvia
19:00 UTC+3	Ikaunieks 39'; Balodis 68'	Report		Stadium: Skonto Stadium; Attendance: 5,128; Referee: Rade Obrenovič (Slovenia)

15 October 2023 UEFA Euro 2024 qualifying	Turkey	4–0	Latvia	Konya, Turkey
21:45 UTC+3	Akgün 58'; Tosun 84', 90+2'; Aktürkoğlu 88'	Report		Stadium: Konya Metropolitan Municipality Stadium; Attendance: 35,925; Referee: Enea Jorgji (Albania)

18 November 2023 UEFA Euro 2024 qualifying	Latvia	0–2	Croatia	Riga, Latvia
19:00 UTC+2		Report	Majer 7'; Kramarić 16'	Stadium: Skonto Stadium; Attendance: 6,747; Referee: Urs Schnyder (Switzerland)

21 November 2023 Friendly	Poland	2–0	Latvia	Warsaw, Poland
20:45 UTC+1	Frankowski 7'; Lewandowski 48'	Report		Stadium: Stadion Narodowy; Attendance: 51,112; Referee: Ondřej Berka (Czech Republic)

=== 2024 ===
21 March 2024 Friendly	Cyprus	1–1	Latvia	Larnaca, Cyprus
19:00 UTC+2	Pittas 34'	Report	Cigaņiks 85'	Stadium: AEK Arena; Referee: Lukas Fähndrich (Switzerland)

26 March 2024 Friendly	Latvia	1–1	Liechtenstein	Larnaca, Cyprus
19:00 UTC+2	Krollis 11'	Report	Ošs 1' (o.g.)	Stadium: Antonis Papadopoulos Stadium; Attendance: 100; Referee: Manfredas Lukjančukas (Lithuania)

8 June 2024 2024 Baltic Cup	Latvia	0–2	Lithuania	Liepāja, Latvia
16:00 UTC+3		Report	Kučys 49'; Dolžnikov 72'	Stadium: Daugava Stadium; Attendance: 3,505; Referee: Juri Frischer (Estonia)

11 June 2024 2024 Baltic Cup	Latvia	1–0	Faroe Islands	Liepāja, Latvia
19:00 UTC+3	Cigaņiks 49'	Report		Stadium: Daugava Stadium; Attendance: 1,414; Referee: Kristo Tohver (Estonia)

7 September 2024 2024–25 Nations League	Armenia	4–1	Latvia	Yerevan, Armenia
20:00 UTC+4	Bichakhchyan 6'; Dubra 35' (o.g.); Zelarayán 48'; Spertsyan 86'	Report	Arutyunyan 9' (o.g.)	Stadium: Vazgen Sargsyan Republican Stadium; Attendance: 12,437; Referee: Nenad Minaković (Serbia)

10 September 2024 2024–25 Nations League	Latvia	1–0	Faroe Islands	Riga, Latvia
19:00 UTC+3	Varslavāns 64'	Report		Stadium: Skonto Stadium; Attendance: 5,808; Referee: Duje Strukan (Croatia)

10 October 2024 2024–25 Nations League	Latvia	0–3	North Macedonia	Riga, Latvia
19:00 UTC+3		Report	Atanasov 35'; Qamili 70'; Elmas 90+3'	Stadium: Skonto Stadium; Attendance: 5,001; Referee: Jakob Sundberg (Denmark)

13 October 2024 2024–25 Nations League	Faroe Islands	1–1	Latvia	Tórshavn, Faroe Islands
19:45 UTC+1	Sørensen 40'	Report	Šits 69'	Stadium: Tórsvøllur; Attendance: 2,017; Referee: Philip Farrugia (Malta)

14 November 2024 2024–25 Nations League	North Macedonia	1–0	Latvia	Skopje, North Macedonia
20:45 UTC+1	Serafimov 57'	Report		Stadium: Toše Proeski Arena; Referee: Goga Kikacheishvili (Georgia)

17 November 2024 2024–25 Nations League	Latvia	1–2	Armenia	Riga, Latvia
16:00 UTC+2	Uldriķis 70'	Report	Spertsyan 48'; Miranyan 74'	Stadium: Skonto Stadium; Attendance: 5,543; Referee: Georgi Kabakov (Bulgaria)

=== 2025 ===
21 March 2025 2026 FIFA World Cup qualification	Andorra	0–1	Latvia	Andorra la Vella, Andorra
20:45 UTC+1		Report	Šits 58'	Stadium: Estadi Nacional; Attendance: 957; Referee: Giorgi Kruashvili (Georgia)

24 March 2025 2026 FIFA World Cup qualification	England	3–0	Latvia	London, England
19:45 UTC+0	James 38'; Kane 68'; Eze 76'	Report		Stadium: Wembley Stadium; Attendance: 79,572; Referee: Orel Grinfeld (Israel)

7 June 2025 Friendly	Latvia	0–0	Azerbaijan	Riga, Latvia
16:00 UTC+3		Report		Stadium: Skonto Stadium; Attendance: 4,594; Referee: Trustin Farrugia Cann (Malta)

10 June 2025 2026 FIFA World Cup qualification	Latvia	1–1	Albania	Riga, Latvia
21:45 UTC+3	Černomordijs 45+4'	Report	Černomordijs 29' (o.g.)	Stadium: Skonto Stadions; Attendance: 6,083; Referee: Halil Umut Meler (Turkey)

6 September 2025 2026 FIFA World Cup qualification	Latvia	0–1	Serbia	Riga, Latvia
16:00 UTC+3		Report	Vlahović 12'	Stadium: Daugava Stadium; Attendance: 6,238; Referee: Julian Weinberger (Austria)

9 September 2025 2026 FIFA World Cup qualification	Albania	1–0	Latvia	Tirana, Albania
20:45 UTC+2	Asllani 25' (pen.)	Report		Stadium: Arena Kombëtare; Attendance: 16,568; Referee: Damian Sylwestrzak (Poland)

11 October 2025 2026 FIFA World Cup qualification	Latvia	2–2	Andorra	Riga, Latvia
16:00 UTC+3	Zelenkovs 41'; Gutkovskis 55' (pen.)	Report	San Nicolás 33'; Olivera 78'	Stadium: Daugava Stadium; Attendance: 5,027; Referee: Georgi Kabakov (Bulgaria)

14 October 2025 2026 FIFA World Cup qualification	Latvia	0–5	England	Riga, Latvia
21:45 UTC+3		Report	Gordon 26'; Kane 44', 45+4' (pen.); Toņiševs 58' (o.g.); Eze 86'	Stadium: Daugava Stadium; Attendance: 10,404; Referee: Tasos Sidiropoulos (Greece)

13 November 2025 Friendly	North Macedonia	0–0	Latvia	Skopje, North Macedonia
18:00 UTC+1		Report		Stadium: Toše Proeski Arena; Attendance: 4,000; Referee: Miloš Savović (Montenegro)

16 November 2025 2026 FIFA World Cup qualification	Serbia	2–1	Latvia	Leskovac, Serbia
18:00 UTC+1	Katai 49'; Stanković 60'	Report	Gutkovskis 12'	Stadium: Dubočica Stadium; Attendance: 3,894; Referee: Ricardo de Burgos Bengoetxea (Spain)

=== 2026 ===
26 March 2026 2024–25 Nations League promotion/relegation play-offs	Gibraltar	0–1	Latvia	Europa Point, Gibraltar
18:00 UTC+1		Report	Gutkovskis 64' (pen.)	Stadium: Europa Sports Park; Attendance: 1,442; Referee: Ivan Kružliak (Slovakia)

31 March 2026 2024–25 Nations League promotion/relegation play-offs	Latvia	1–0 (2–0 agg.)	Gibraltar	Riga, Latvia
19:00 UTC+3	Černomordijs 90+3'	Report		Stadium: Skonto Stadium; Attendance: 5,120; Referee: Sandro Schärer (Switzerland)

6 June 2026 2026 Baltic Cup	Lithuania	1–1 (5–4 p)	Latvia	Kaunas, Lithuania
16:00 UTC+3	Kučys 28'	Report	Toņiševs 60'	Stadium: Darius and Girėnas Stadium; Attendance: 7,789; Referee: Joonas Jaanotivs (Estonia)
	Penalties
	Utkus (penalty scored); Gineitis (penalty scored); Kučys (penalty scored); Michelbrink (penalty missed); Novikovas (penalty scored); Burba (penalty scored)		(penalty scored) Regža; (penalty scored) Ķigurs; (penalty missed) Meļņiks; (penalty scored) Cigaņiks; (penalty scored) Saveļjevs; (penalty missed) Penkevics

9 June 2026 2026 Baltic Cup	Latvia	0–1	Faroe Islands	Riga, Latvia
18:00 UTC+3		Report	Sørensen 81'	Stadium: LNK Sporta Parks; Attendance: 729; Referee: Dovydas Švėgžda (Lithuania)

25 September 2026 2026–27 Nations League	Armenia	2–0	Latvia	Yerevan, Armenia
20:00 UTC+4	Arutyunyan 31'; Garibyan 75'	Report		Stadium: Vazgen Sargsyan Republican Stadium; Attendance: 11,093; Referee: Martin Matoša (Slovenia)

28 September 2026 2026–27 Nations League	Latvia	0–0	Cyprus	Riga, Latvia
19:00 UTC+3		Report		Stadium: Skonto Stadium; Attendance: 6,069; Referee: Michal Očenáš (Slovakia)

2 October 2026 2026–27 Nations League	Latvia	1–2	Montenegro	Riga, Latvia
19:00 UTC+3	Strods 82'	Report	Adzic 3', 56'	Stadium: Skonto Stadium; Attendance: 6,149; Referee: Radoslav Gidzhenov (Bulgaria)

5 October 2026 2026–27 Nations League	Cyprus	2–1	Latvia	Nicosia, Cyprus
19:00 UTC+3	Kosti 70'; Edwards 90+4'	Report	Dašķevičs 57'	Stadium: GSP Stadium; Attendance: 2,354; Referee: Giorgi Kruashvili (Georgia)

12 November 2026 2026–27 Nations League	Montenegro	2–1	Latvia	Podgorica, Montenegro
20:45 UTC+1	Krstović 70'; Maraš 90+1'	Report	Meļņiks 72'	Stadium: Podgorica City Stadium; Attendance: 5,799; Referee: Jérôme Brisard (France)

15 November 2026 2026–27 Nations League	Latvia	0–0	Armenia	Riga, Latvia
16:00 UTC+2		Report		Stadium: Skonto Stadium; Attendance: 5,355; Referee: Vasilios Fotias (Greece)
