= Iceland national football team results (2020–present) =

Win Draw Loss

This article provides details of international football games played by the Iceland national football team from 2020 to present.

== Results ==
Key
Win
Draw
Defeat

=== 2020 ===
15 January 2020 Friendly	Canada	0–1	Iceland	Irvine, United States
16:00 UTC−8		Report	Eyjólfsson 21'	Stadium: Championship Soccer Stadium; Attendance: 20; Referee: Rubiel Vazquez (United States)

19 January 2020 Friendly	El Salvador	0–1	Iceland	Carson, United States
16:00 UTC−8		Report	K. Finnbogason 64'	Stadium: Dignity Health Sports Park; Attendance: 500; Referee: Alejandro Mariscal (United States)

5 September 2020 2020–21 Nations League	Iceland	0–1	England	Reykjavík, Iceland
18:45 UTC+0	Ingason (yellow card) 42' (yellow-red card) 89'	Report	Walker (yellow card) 33' (yellow-red card) 70'; Sterling 90+1' (pen.); Gomez (yellow card) 90+2'	Stadium: Laugardalsvöllur; Attendance: 0 (Note: Due to the COVID-19 pandemic in Europe, all matches scheduled for September 2020 were played behind closed doors.); Referee: Srđan Jovanović (Serbia)

8 September 2020 2020–21 Nations League	Belgium	5–1	Iceland	Brussels, Belgium
20:45 UTC+2	Witsel 13'; Batshuayi 17', 69'; Mertens 50'; Doku 80'	Report	H. Friðjónsson 11'	Stadium: King Baudouin Stadium; Attendance: 0 Referee: Paweł Raczkowski (Poland)

8 October 2020 Euro 2020 qualifying play-offs	Iceland	2–1	Romania	Reykjavík, Iceland
18:45 UTC+0	G. Sigurðsson 16', 35'	Report	Maxim 63' (pen.)	Stadium: Laugardalsvöllur; Attendance: 60; Referee: Damir Skomina (Slovenia)

11 October 2020 2020–21 Nations League	Iceland	0–3	Denmark	Reykjavík, Iceland
18:45 UTC+0		Report	Sigurjónsson 45' (o.g.); Eriksen 46'; Skov 61'	Stadium: Laugardalsvöllur; Attendance: 60; Referee: Bojan Pandžić (Sweden)

14 October 2020 2020–21 Nations League	Iceland	1–2	Belgium	Reykjavík, Iceland
18:45 UTC+0	Sævarsson 17'	Report	Lukaku 9', 38' (pen.)	Stadium: Laugardalsvöllur; Attendance: 60; Referee: Andris Treimanis (Latvia)

12 November 2020 Euro 2020 qualifying play-offs	Hungary	2–1	Iceland	Budapest, Hungary
20:45 UTC+1	Négo 88'; Szoboszlai 90+2'	Report	G. Sigurðsson 11'	Stadium: Puskás Aréna; Attendance: 0 (Note: The Hungary v Iceland match was played behind closed doors due to the COVID-19 pandemic in Hungary.); Referee: Björn Kuipers (Netherlands)

15 November 2020 2020–21 Nations League	Denmark	2–1	Iceland	Copenhagen, Denmark
20:45 UTC+1	Eriksen 12' (pen.), 90+2' (pen.)	Report	Kjartansson 85'	Stadium: Parken Stadium; Attendance: 141; Referee: Halil Umut Meler (Turkey)

18 November 2020 2020–21 Nations League	England	4–0	Iceland	London, England
19:45 UTC+0	Rice 20'; Mount 24'; Foden 80', 84'	Report		Stadium: Wembley Stadium; Attendance: 0 Referee: Fábio Veríssimo (Portugal)

=== 2021 ===
25 March 2021 2022 World Cup qualification	Germany	3–0	Iceland	Duisburg, Germany
20:45 UTC+1	Goretzka 3'; Havertz 7'; Gündoğan 56'	Report		Stadium: MSV-Arena; Attendance: 0 Referee: Srđan Jovanović (Serbia)

28 March 2021 2022 World Cup qualification	Armenia	2–0	Iceland	Yerevan, Armenia
18:00 UTC+1	Barseghyan 53'; Bayramyan 74'	Report		Stadium: Vazgen Sargsyan Republican Stadium; Attendance: 0 Referee: Enea Jorgji (Albania)

31 March 2021 2022 World Cup qualification	Liechtenstein	1–4	Iceland	Vaduz, Liechtenstein
20:45 UTC+2	Y. Frick 79'	Report	Sævarsson 12'; Bjarnason 45+1'; Pálsson 77'; Sigurjónsson 90+4' (pen.)	Stadium: Rheinpark Stadion; Attendance: 0 Referee: Mohammed Al-Hakim (Sweden)

29 May 2021 Friendly	Mexico	2–1	Iceland	Arlington, United States
20:00 UTC−5	Lozano 73', 78'	Report	Álvarez 14' (o.g.)	Stadium: AT&T Stadium; Attendance: 0 Referee: Ted Unkel (United States)

4 June 2021 Friendly	Faroe Islands	0–1	Iceland	Tórshavn, Faroe Islands
19:45 UTC+1		Report	Anderson 70'	Stadium: Tórsvøllur; Attendance: 0 Referee: Kristo Tohver (Estonia)

8 June 2021 Friendly	Poland	2–2	Iceland	Poznań, Poland
18:00 UTC+2	Zieliński 34'; Świderski 88'	Report	Guðmundsson 24'; Br. Bjarnason 47'	Stadium: Stadion Miejski; Attendance: 19,614; Referee: Balázs Berke (Hungary)

2 September 2021 2022 World Cup qualification	Iceland	0–2	Romania	Reykjavík, Iceland
18:45 UTC+0		Report	Man 47'; Stanciu 83'	Stadium: Laugardalsvöllur; Attendance: 1,961; Referee: Aleksei Kulbakov (Belarus)

5 September 2021 2022 World Cup qualification	Iceland	2–2	North Macedonia	Reykjavík, Iceland
16:00 UTC+0	Br. Bjarnason 78'; Guðjohnsen 84'	Report	Velkovski 11'; Alioski 54'	Stadium: Laugardalsvöllur; Attendance: 1,862; Referee: Ivan Kružliak (Slovakia)

8 September 2021 2022 World Cup qualification	Iceland	0–4	Germany	Reykjavík, Iceland
18:45 UTC+0		Report	Gnabry 4'; Rüdiger 24'; Sané 56'; Werner 89'	Stadium: Laugardalsvöllur; Attendance: 3,505; Referee: Andreas Ekberg (Sweden)

8 October 2021 2022 World Cup qualification	Iceland	1–1	Armenia	Reykjavík, Iceland
18:45 UTC+0	Jóhannesson 77'	Report	Hovhannisyan 35'	Stadium: Laugardalsvöllur; Attendance: 1,697; Referee: Nikola Dabanović (Montenegro)

11 October 2021 2022 World Cup qualification	Iceland	4–0	Liechtenstein	Reykjavík, Iceland
18:45 UTC+0	Þórðarson 19'; Guðmundsson 35' (pen.), 79' (pen.); Guðjohnsen 89'	Report		Stadium: Laugardalsvöllur; Attendance: 4,461; Referee: Ioannis Papadopoulos (Greece)

11 November 2021 2022 World Cup qualification	Romania	0–0	Iceland	Bucharest, Romania
21:45 UTC+2		Report		Stadium: Stadionul Steaua; Attendance: 0 Referee: Sergei Karasev (Russia)

14 November 2021 2022 FIFA World Cup qualification	North Macedonia	3–1	Iceland	Skopje, North Macedonia
18:00 UTC+1	Alioski 7'; Elmas 65', 87'	Report	Þorsteinsson 54'	Stadium: Toše Proeski Arena; Attendance: 15,986; Referee: Davide Massa (Italy)

=== 2022 ===
12 January 2022 Friendly	Iceland	1–1	Uganda	Belek, Turkey
17:00 UTC+3	Böðvarsson 5'	Report	Kaddu 31' (pen.)	Stadium: Titanic Deluxe Belek Football Center; Attendance: 0 Referee: Yaşar Kemal Uğurlu (Turkey)

15 January 2022 Friendly	Iceland	1–5	South Korea	Antalya, Turkey
14:00 UTC+3	Guðjohnsen 55'	Report	Cho Gue-sung 15'; Kwon Chang-hoon 27'; Paik Seung-ho 29'; Kim Jin-kyu 75'; Eom Ji-sung 85'	Stadium: Mardan Sports Complex; Attendance: 0 Referee: Ali Palabıyık (Turkey)

26 March 2022 Friendly	Finland	1–1	Iceland	Murcia, Spain
17:00 UTC+1	Pukki 12'	Report	Bjarnason 38'	Stadium: Estadio Nueva Condomina; Attendance: 300; Referee: Fedayi San (Switzerland)

29 March 2022 Friendly	Spain	5–0	Iceland	A Coruña, Spain
20:45 UTC+2	Morata 36', 39' (pen.); Pino 47'; Sarabia 61', 72'	Report		Stadium: Riazor; Attendance: 28,117; Referee: Horațiu Feșnic (Romania)

2 June 2022 2022–23 Nations League	Israel	2–2	Iceland	Haifa, Israel
21:45 UTC+3	Abada 25'; Weissman 84'	Report	Helgason 42'; Sigurðsson 53'	Stadium: Sammy Ofer Stadium; Attendance: 13,150; Referee: Andris Treimanis (Latvia)

6 June 2022 2022–23 Nations League	Iceland	1–1	Albania	Reykjavík, Iceland
18:45 UTC+0	Þorsteinsson 49'	Report	Seferi 30'	Stadium: Laugardalsvöllur; Attendance: 4,033; Referee: Craig Pawson (England)

9 June 2022 Friendly	San Marino	0–1	Iceland	Serravalle, San Marino
20:45 UTC+2		Report	Þrándarson 11'	Stadium: Stadio Olimpico di Serravalle; Attendance: 293; Referee: Michael Fabbri (Italy)

10 June 2022 2022–23 Nations League	Russia	Cancelled	Iceland	Moscow, Russia (Note: On 2 May 2022, UEFA announced that Russia were suspended and automatically relegated to League C due to their country's invasion of Ukraine.)
21:45 UTC+3				Stadium: VTB Arena

13 June 2022 2022–23 Nations League	Iceland	2–2	Israel	Reykjavík, Iceland
18:45 UTC+0	Þorsteinsson 9'; Helgason 60'	Report	Grétarsson 35' (o.g.); Peretz 65'	Stadium: Laugardalsvöllur; Attendance: 2,778; Referee: Duje Strukan (Croatia)

22 September 2022 Friendly	Venezuela	0–1	Iceland	Mödling, Austria
18:00 UTC+2		Report	Jóhannesson 87' (pen.)	Stadium: Motion invest Arena; Attendance: 50; Referee: Sebastian Gishamer (Austria)

24 September 2022 2022–23 Nations League	Iceland	Cancelled	Russia	Reykjavík, Iceland
13:00 UTC+0				Stadium: Laugardalsvöllur

27 September 2022 2022–23 Nations League	Albania	1–1	Iceland	Tirana, Albania
20:45 UTC+2	Lenjani 35'	Report	Anderson 90+7'	Stadium: Arena Kombëtare; Attendance: 8,800; Referee: Ricardo de Burgos Bengoetxea (Spain)

6 November 2022 Friendly	Saudi Arabia	1–0	Iceland	Abu Dhabi, United Arab Emirates
16:00 UTC+4	Abdulhamid 26'	Report		Stadium: Mohammed bin Zayed Stadium; Attendance: 0 Referee: Ahmed Eisa Darwich (United Arab Emirates)

11 November 2022 Friendly	South Korea	1–0	Iceland	Hwaseong, South Korea
20:00 UTC+9	Song Min-kyu 33'	Report		Stadium: Hwaseong Stadium; Attendance: 15,274; Referee: Jumpei Iida (Japan)

16 November 2022 2022 Baltic Cup	Lithuania	0–0 (5–6 p)	Iceland	Kaunas, Lithuania
16:00 UTC+2				Stadium: Darius and Girėnas Stadium; Attendance: 5,934; Referee: Andris Treimanis (Latvia)
	Penalties
	Girdvainis (penalty scored); Gineitis (penalty scored); Novikovas (penalty scored); Golubickas (penalty scored); Baravykas (penalty scored); Žebrauskas (penalty missed)		(penalty scored) A. Guðjohnsen; (penalty scored) Þórðarson; (penalty scored) Sigurðsson; (penalty scored) Anderson; (penalty scored) Ingason; (penalty scored) Þrándarson

19 November 2022 2022 Baltic Cup	Latvia	1–1 (7–8 p)	Iceland	Riga, Latvia
16:00 UTC+2	Cigaņiks 67'	Report	Jóhannesson 62' (pen.)	Stadium: Daugavas stadions Attendance: 997; Referee: Joonas Jaanovits (Estonia)
	Penalties
	J. Ikaunieks (penalty scored); Zjuzins (penalty scored); D. Ikaunieks (penalty scored); Jaunzems (penalty scored); Stuglis (penalty scored); Sorokins (penalty scored); Cigaņiks (penalty scored); Černomordijs (penalty missed)		(penalty scored) Jóhannesson; (penalty scored) S. Guðjohnsen; (penalty scored) Helgason; (penalty scored) Sigurðsson; (penalty scored) Þórðarson; (penalty scored) Þrándarson; (penalty scored) Ellertsson; (penalty scored) Grétarsson

=== 2023 ===
8 January 2023 Friendly	Iceland	1–1	Estonia	Albufeira, Portugal
17:00	A. Guðjohnsen 90+1' (pen.)	Report	Zenjov 45'	Stadium: Estadio da Nora; Attendance: 50; Referee: Miguel Nogueira (Portugal)

12 January 2023 Friendly	Sweden	2–1	Iceland	Algarve, Portugal
18:00	E. Andersson 85'; Ondrejka 90+4'	Report	S. Guðjohnsen 30'	Stadium: Estádio Algarve; Attendance: 212; Referee: Luís Godinho (Portugal)

23 March 2023 Euro 2024 qualifying	Bosnia and Herzegovina	3–0	Iceland	Zenica, Bosnia and Herzegovina
20:45	Krunić 14', 40'; Dedić 63'	Report		Stadium: Bilino Polje; Attendance: 9,234; Referee: Donatas Rumšas (Lithuania)

26 March 2023 Euro 2024 qualifying	Liechtenstein	0–7	Iceland	Vaduz, Liechtenstein
18:00		Report	Ólafsson 3'; Haraldsson 38'; Gunnarsson 48', 68', 73' (pen.); A. Guðjohnsen 85'; Ellertsson 87'	Stadium: Rheinpark Stadion; Attendance: 1,692; Referee: Jakob Kehlet (Denmark)

17 June 2023 Euro 2024 qualifying	Iceland	1–2	Slovakia	Reykjavík, Iceland
20:45 (18:45 UTC±0)	Finnbogason 41' (pen.)	Report	Kucka 27'; Suslov 70'	Stadium: Laugardalsvöllur; Attendance: 7,555; Referee: Don Robertson (Scotland)

20 June 2023 Euro 2024 qualifying	Iceland	0–1	Portugal	Reykjavík, Iceland
20:45 (18:45 UTC±0)		Report	Ronaldo 89'	Stadium: Laugardalsvöllur; Attendance: 9,517; Referee: Daniel Siebert (Germany)

8 September 2023 Euro 2024 qualifying	Luxembourg	3–1	Iceland	Luxembourg City, Luxembourg
20:45	Chanot 9' (pen.); Borges Sanches 70'; Sinani 89'	Report	Haraldsson 88'	Stadium: Stade de Luxembourg; Attendance: 7,427; Referee: Goga Kikacheishvili (Georgia)

11 September 2023 Euro 2024 qualifying	Iceland	1–0	Bosnia and Herzegovina	Reykjavík, Iceland
20:45 (18:45 UTC±0)	Finnbogason 90+1'	Report		Stadium: Laugardalsvöllur; Attendance: 5,229; Referee: Lawrence Visser (Belgium)

13 October 2023 Euro 2024 qualifying	Iceland	1–1	Luxembourg	Reykjavík, Iceland
20:45 (18:45 UTC±0)	Óskarsson 23'	Report	Rodrigues 46'	Stadium: Laugardalsvöllur; Attendance: 4,568; Referee: Sebastian Gishamer (Austria)

16 October 2023 Euro 2024 qualifying	Iceland	4–0	Liechtenstein	Reykjavík, Iceland
20:45 (18:45 UTC±0)	G. Sigurðsson 22' (pen.), 49'; Finnbogason 44'; Haraldsson 63'	Report		Stadium: Laugardalsvöllur; Attendance: 4,317; Referee: Abdulkadir Bitigen (Turkey)

16 November 2023 Euro 2024 qualifying	Slovakia	4–2	Iceland	Bratislava, Slovakia
20:45	Kucka 30'; Duda 36' (pen.); Haraslín 47', 55'	Report	Óskarsson 17'; Guðjohnsen 74'	Stadium: Tehelné pole Attendance: 21,548; Referee: Craig Pawson (England)

19 November 2023 Euro 2024 qualifying	Portugal	2–0	Iceland	Lisbon, Portugal
20:45 (19:45 UTC±0)	Fernandes 37'; Horta 66'	Report		Stadium: Estádio José Alvalade; Attendance: 45,655; Referee: Anastasios Papapetrou (Greece)

=== 2024 ===
13 January 2024 Friendly	Guatemala	0–1	Iceland	Fort Lauderdale, United States
19:00 UTC−5		Report	Þorvaldsson 79'	Stadium: DRV PNK Stadium; Attendance: 4,000; Referee: Rubiel Vazquez (United States)

17 January 2024 Friendly	Honduras	0–2	Iceland	Fort Lauderdale, United States
20:00 UTC−5		Report	B. Willumsson 48' (pen.); Guðjohnsen 58'	Stadium: DRV PNK Stadium; Attendance: 7,000; Referee: Natalie Simon (United States)

21 March 2024 Euro 2024 qualifying play-offs	Israel	1–4	Iceland	Budapest, Hungary (Note: Due to the Gaza war, Israel are required to play their home matches at neutral venues until further notice.)
20:45	Zahavi 31' (pen.)	Report	A. Guðmundsson 39', 83', 87'; Traustason 42'	Stadium: Szusza Ferenc Stadion; Attendance: 1,226; Referee: Anthony Taylor (England)

26 March 2024 Euro 2024 qualifying play-offs	Ukraine	2–1	Iceland	Wrocław, Poland (Note: Due to the Russian invasion of Ukraine, Ukraine are required to play their home matches at neutral venues until further notice.)
20:45	Tsyhankov 54'; Mudryk 84'	Report	A. Guðmundsson 30'	Stadium: Wrocław Stadium; Attendance: 29,310; Referee: Clément Turpin (France)

7 June 2024 Friendly	England	0–1	Iceland	London, England
19:45		Report	Þorsteinsson 12'	Stadium: Wembley Stadium; Attendance: 81,410; Referee: Davide Massa (Italy)

10 June 2024 Friendly	Netherlands	4–0	Iceland	Rotterdam, Netherlands
20:45 (UTC+1)	Simons 23'; Van Dijk 49'; Malen 79'; Weghorst 90+3'	Report		Stadium: De Kuip; Attendance: 42,000; Referee: Evangelos Manouchos (Greece)

6 September 2024 2024–25 Nations League	Iceland	2–0	Montenegro	Reykjavík, Iceland
18:45 UTC+0	Óskarsson 39'; Þorsteinsson 58'	Report		Stadium: Laugardalsvöllur; Attendance: 4,683; Referee: Willy Delajod (France)

9 September 2024 2024–25 Nations League	Turkey	3–1	Iceland	İzmir, Turkey
21:45 UTC+3	Aktürkoğlu 2', 52', 88'	Report	Pálsson 37'	Stadium: Gürsel Aksel Stadium; Attendance: 16,167; Referee: Enea Jorgji (Albania)

11 October 2024 2024–25 Nations League	Iceland	2–2	Wales	Reykjavík, Iceland
18:45 UTC+0	Tómasson 69'; Ward 72' (o.g.)	Report	Johnson 11'; Wilson 29'	Stadium: Laugardalsvöllur; Attendance: 6,141; Referee: Antoni Bandić (Bosnia and Herzegovina)

14 October 2024 2024–25 Nations League	Iceland	2–4	Turkey	Reykjavík, Iceland
18:45 UTC+0	Óskarsson 3'; A. Guðjohnsen 83'	Report	Kahveci 62'; Çalhanoğlu 67' (pen.); Güler 88'; Aktürkoğlu 90+5'	Stadium: Laugardalsvöllur; Attendance: 5,260; Referee: Damian Sylwestrzak (Poland)

16 November 2024 2024–25 Nations League	Montenegro	0–2	Iceland	Nikšić, Montenegro
18:00 UTC+1		Report	Óskarsson 74'; Jóhannesson 88'	Stadium: Gradski stadion Attendance: 2,354; Referee: Sven Jablonski (Germany)

19 November 2024 2024–25 Nations League	Wales	4–1	Iceland	Cardiff, Wales
19:45 UTC+0	Cullen 32', 45+1'; Johnson 65'; Wilson 79'	Report	A. Guðjohnsen 8'	Stadium: Cardiff City Stadium; Attendance: 28,240; Referee: António Nobre (Portugal)

=== 2025 ===
20 March 2025 2024–25 Nations League relegation play-offs	Kosovo	2–1	Iceland	Pristina, Kosovo
20:45 UTC+1	Dellova 19'; Rexhbeçaj 58'	Report	Óskarsson 22'	Stadium: Fadil Vokrri Stadium; Attendance: 12,857; Referee: Serdar Gözübüyük (Netherlands)

23 March 2025 2024–25 Nations League relegation play-offs	Iceland	1–3 (2–5 agg.)	Kosovo	Murcia, Spain (Note: Iceland will play their home match at Estadio Nueva Condomina, Murcia, Spain, due to construction on Laugardalsvöllur, Reykjavík, the only Icelandic venue which meets UEFA requirements.)
17:00 UTC+0	Óskarsson 2'	Report	Muriqi 35', 45+3', 79'	Stadium: Estadio Nueva Condomina; Attendance: 1,553; Referee: Jesús Gil Manzano (Spain)

6 June 2025 Friendly	Scotland	1–3	Iceland	Glasgow, Scotland
19:45 UTC+1	Souttar 25'	Report	A. Guðjohnsen 8'; Ferguson 45' (o.g.); Pálsson 52'	Stadium: Hampden Park; Attendance: 32,797; Referee: Granit Maqedonci (Sweden)

10 June 2025 Friendly	Northern Ireland	1–0	Iceland	Belfast, Northern Ireland
19:45 UTC+1	Price 36'	Report		Stadium: Windsor Park; Attendance: 18,021; Referee: Morten Krogh (Denmark)

5 September 2025 2026 World Cup qualification	Iceland	5–0	Azerbaijan	Reykjavík, Iceland
18:45 UTC+0	Pálsson 45+2'; Jóhannesson 47', 56'; Guðmundsson 66'; Hlynsson 73'	Report		Stadium: Laugardalsvöllur; Attendance: 4,021; Referee: Sander van der Eijk (Netherlands)

9 September 2025 2026 World Cup qualification	France	2–1	Iceland	Paris, France
20:45 UTC+2	Mbappé 45' (pen.); Barcola 62'	Report	A. Guðjohnsen 21'	Stadium: Parc des Princes; Attendance: 40,150; Referee: António Nobre (Portugal)

10 October 2025 2026 World Cup qualification	Iceland	3–5	Ukraine	Reykjavík, Iceland
18:45 UTC+0	Ellertsson 34'; Guðmundsson 59', 75'	Report	Malinovskyi 14', 45+5'; Hutsulyak 45'; Kalyuzhnyi 85'; Ocheretko 88'	Stadium: Laugardalsvöllur; Attendance: 9,111; Referee: Sven Jablonski (Germany)

13 October 2025 2026 World Cup qualification	Iceland	2–2	France	Reykjavík, Iceland
18:45 UTC+0	Pálsson 39'; Hlynsson 70'	Report	Nkunku 63'; Mateta 68'	Stadium: Laugardalsvöllur; Attendance: 9,151; Referee: Orel Grinfeld (Israel)

13 November 2025 2026 World Cup qualification	Azerbaijan	0–2	Iceland	Baku, Azerbaijan
21:00 UTC+4		Report	Guðmundsson 20'; Ingason 39'	Stadium: Neftçi Arena; Attendance: 4,300; Referee: Nikola Dabanović (Montenegro)

16 November 2025 2026 World Cup qualification	Ukraine	2–0	Iceland	Warsaw, Poland (Note: Due to the Russian invasion of Ukraine, Ukraine are required to play their home matches at neutral venues until further notice.)
18:00 UTC+1	Zubkov 83'; Hutsuliak 90+3'	Report		Stadium: Polish Army Stadium; Attendance: 20,004; Referee: Anthony Taylor (England)

=== 2026 ===
25 February 2026 Friendly	Mexico	4–0	Iceland	Querétaro, Mexico
20:00 UTC−6	Ledezma 22'; González 24'; Gallardo 59'; Gutiérrez 90+2'	Report		Stadium: Estadio Corregidora; Attendance: 34,130; Referee: Steven Madrigal (Costa Rica)

28 March 2026 Friendly	Canada	2–2	Iceland	Toronto, Canada
13:00 UTC−4	David 67' (pen.), 75' (pen.)	Report	Óskarsson 9', 21'	Stadium: BMO Field; Attendance: 26,328; Referee: Jon Freemon (United States)

31 March 2026 Friendly	Haiti	1–1	Iceland	Toronto, Canada
13:30 UTC−4 (Note: The match originally scheduled at 12:30 p.m. (UTC-4) but was delayed because of bad weather.)	Isidor 88'	Report	Sigurðsson 61'	Stadium: BMO Field; Attendance: 0 (BCD); Referee: Carly Shaw-Maclaren (Canada)

31 May 2026 Kirin Challenge Cup 2026	Japan	1–0	Iceland	Tokyo, Japan
19:25 UTC+9	Ogawa 87'	Report		Stadium: National Stadium; Attendance: 62,212; Referee: Damian Kos (Poland)

9 June 2026 Friendly	Argentina	3–0	Iceland	Auburn, United States
20:00 UTC−6	Barco 8'; Messi 72' (pen.); Almada 86'	Report		Stadium: Jordan–Hare Stadium; Attendance: 88,043; Referee: Rosendo Mendoza (United States)

26 September 2026 2026–27 Nations League	Iceland	1–1	Estonia	Reykjavík, Iceland
16:00 UTC+0	Guðjohnsen 45'	Report	Paskotši 64'	Stadium: Laugardalsvöllur; Attendance: 5,320; Referee: Miloš Milanović (Serbia)

29 September 2026 2026–27 Nations League	Luxembourg	0–3	Iceland	Luxembourg City, Luxembourg
20:45 UTC+2		Report	Guðjohnsen 13'; Óskarsson 39'; Pálsson 73'	Stadium: Stade de Luxembourg; Attendance: 8,879; Referee: Enea Jorgji (Albania)

3 October 2026 2026–27 Nations League	Iceland	3–0	Bulgaria	Reykjavík, Iceland
16:00 UTC+0	Óskarsson 37', 60'; Ellertsson 90'	Report		Stadium: Laugardalsvöllur; Attendance: 5,069; Referee: Balázs Berke (Hungary)

6 October 2026 2026–27 Nations League	Estonia	0–0	Iceland	Tallinn, Estonia
21:45 UTC+3		Report		Stadium: Lilleküla Stadium; Attendance: 5,987; Referee: David Dickinson (Scotland)

13 November 2026 2026–27 Nations League	Bulgaria	0–5	Iceland	Plovdiv, Bulgaria
21:45 UTC+2		Report	Guðjohnsen 17' (pen.), 68', 79'; Óskarsson 21'; Tsenov 52' (o.g.)	Stadium: Hristo Botev Stadium; Attendance: 1,150; Referee: Florian Badstübner (Germany)

16 November 2026 2026–27 Nations League	Iceland	3–0	Luxembourg	Reykjavík, Iceland
17:00 UTC+0	Willumsson 25'; Guðjohnsen 37' (pen.); Ellertsson 50'	Report		Stadium: Laugardalsvöllur; Attendance: 2,644; Referee: Marian Barbu (Romania)
