= 2026 FIFA World Cup qualification – UEFA Group K =

Association football tournament group

The 2026 FIFA World Cup qualification UEFA Group K was one of the twelve UEFA groups in the World Cup qualification tournament to decide which teams would qualify for the 2026 FIFA World Cup final tournament in Canada, Mexico and the United States. Group K consisted of five teams: Albania, Andorra, England, Latvia and Serbia. The teams played against each other home-and-away in a round-robin format from March to November 2025. However, as Serbia were involved in the Nations League promotion/relegation play-offs in March, they began their qualifying campaign in June 2025.

The group winners, England, qualified directly for the World Cup finals, while the runners-up, Albania, advanced to the second round (play-offs).

== Standings ==
Pos	Team	Pld	W	D	L	GF	GA	GD	Pts	Qualification	(England)	(Albania)	(Serbia)	(Latvia)	(Andorra)
1	England	8	8	0	0	22	0	+22	24	Qualification for 2026 FIFA World Cup	—	2–0	2–0	3–0	2–0
2	Albania	8	4	2	2	7	5	+2	14	Advance to play-offs	0–2	—	0–0	1–0	3–0
3	Serbia	8	4	1	3	9	10	−1	13		0–5	0–1	—	2–1	3–0
4	Latvia	8	1	2	5	5	15	−10	5		0–5	1–1	0–1	—	2–2
5	Andorra	8	0	1	7	3	16	−13	1		0–1	0–1	1–3	0–1	—

Source: FIFA, UEFA
Rules for classification: Tiebreakers

== Matches ==
The fixture list was confirmed by UEFA on 13 December 2024 following the draw. Times are CET/CEST, (Note: CET (UTC+1) for matches until 29 March and from 26 October (matchday 1–2 and 9–10), and CEST (UTC+2) for matches from 30 March to 25 October 2025 (matchday 3–8).) as listed by UEFA (local times, if different, are in parentheses).

21 March 2025
20:45

Andorra	0–1	Latvia
	Report (FIFA); Report (UEFA)	Šits 58'

Estadi Nacional, Andorra la Vella
Attendance: 957
Referee: Giorgi Kruashvili (Georgia)
21 March 2025
20:45 (19:45 UTC+0)

England	2–0	Albania
Lewis-Skelly 20'; Kane 77'	Report (FIFA); Report (UEFA)

Wembley Stadium, London
Attendance: 82,378
Referee: Alejandro Hernández Hernández (Spain)

24 March 2025
20:45

Albania	3–0	Andorra
Manaj 9', 19'; Uzuni 90+2'	Report (FIFA); Report (UEFA)

Arena Kombëtare, Tirana
Attendance: 17,183
Referee: Sebastian Gishamer (Austria)
24 March 2025
20:45 (19:45 UTC+0)

England	3–0	Latvia
James 38'; Kane 68'; Eze 76'	Report (FIFA); Report (UEFA)

Wembley Stadium, London
Attendance: 79,572
Referee: Orel Grinfeld (Israel)

7 June 2025
18:00

Andorra	0–1	England
	Report (FIFA); Report (UEFA)	Kane 50'

RCDE Stadium, Barcelona (Spain) (Note: The Andorra v England match was played at a neutral venue because there were no stadiums in Andorra that met the UEFA requirements due to the match opponent.)
Attendance: 8,872
Referee: Igor Pajač (Croatia)
7 June 2025
20:45

Albania	0–0	Serbia
	Report (FIFA); Report (UEFA)

Arena Kombëtare, Tirana
Attendance: 20,427
Referee: Davide Massa (Italy)

10 June 2025
20:45 (21:45 UTC+3)

Latvia	1–1	Albania
Černomordijs 45+4'	Report (FIFA); Report (UEFA)	Černomordijs 29' (o.g.)

Skonto Stadium, Riga
Attendance: 6,083
Referee: Halil Umut Meler (Turkey)
10 June 2025
20:45

Serbia	3–0	Andorra
A. Mitrović 12', 24', 53' (pen.)	Report (FIFA); Report (UEFA)

Dubočica Stadium, Leskovac
Attendance: 7,576
Referee: Aliyar Aghayev (Azerbaijan)

6 September 2025
15:00 (16:00 UTC+3)

Latvia	0–1	Serbia
	Report (FIFA); Report (UEFA)	Vlahović 12'

Daugava Stadium, Riga
Attendance: 6,238
Referee: Julian Weinberger (Austria)
6 September 2025
18:00 (17:00 UTC+1)

England	2–0	Andorra
García 25' (o.g.); Rice 67'	Report (FIFA); Report (UEFA)

Villa Park, Birmingham
Attendance: 39,202
Referee: Mohammad Al-Emara (Finland)

9 September 2025
20:45

Albania	1–0	Latvia
Asllani 25' (pen.)	Report (FIFA); Report (UEFA)

Arena Kombëtare, Tirana
Attendance: 16,568
Referee: Damian Sylwestrzak (Poland)
9 September 2025
20:45

Serbia	0–5	England
	Report (FIFA); Report (UEFA)	Kane 33'; Madueke 35'; Konsa 52'; Guéhi 75'; Rashford 90' (pen.)

Red Star Stadium, Belgrade
Attendance: 39,789
Referee: Clément Turpin (France)

11 October 2025
15:00 (16:00 UTC+3)

Latvia	2–2	Andorra
Zelenkovs 41'; Gutkovskis 55' (pen.)	Report (FIFA); Report (UEFA)	San Nicolás 33'; Olivera 78'

Daugava Stadium, Riga
Attendance: 5,027
Referee: Georgi Kabakov (Bulgaria)
11 October 2025
20:45

Serbia	0–1	Albania
	Report (FIFA); Report (UEFA)	Manaj 45+1'

Dubočica Stadium, Leskovac
Attendance: 4,320
Referee: István Kovács (Romania)

14 October 2025
20:45

Andorra	1–3	Serbia
López 17'	Report (FIFA); Report (UEFA)	García 19' (o.g.); Vlahović 54'; A. Mitrović 77' (pen.)

Estadi de la FAF, Encamp
Attendance: 987
Referee: Anastasios Papapetrou (Greece)
14 October 2025
20:45 (21:45 UTC+3)

Latvia	0–5	England
	Report (FIFA); Report (UEFA)	Gordon 26'; Kane 44', 45+4' (pen.); Toņiševs 58' (o.g.); Eze 86'

Daugava Stadium, Riga
Attendance: 10,404
Referee: Anastasios Sidiropoulos (Greece)

13 November 2025
20:45

Andorra	0–1	Albania
	Report (FIFA); Report (UEFA)	Asllani 67'

Estadi de la FAF, Encamp
Attendance: 2,225
Referee: Horațiu Feșnic (Romania)
13 November 2025
20:45 (19:45 UTC+0)

England	2–0	Serbia
Saka 28'; Eze 90'	Report (FIFA); Report (UEFA)

Wembley Stadium, London
Attendance: 74,289
Referee: Ivan Kružliak (Slovakia)

16 November 2025
18:00

Albania	0–2	England
	Report (FIFA); Report (UEFA)	Kane 74', 82'

Arena Kombëtare, Tirana
Attendance: 21,459
Referee: Marco Guida (Italy)
16 November 2025
18:00

Serbia	2–1	Latvia
Katai 49'; Stanković 60'	Report (FIFA); Report (UEFA)	Gutkovskis 12'

Dubočica Stadium, Leskovac
Attendance: 3,894
Referee: Ricardo de Burgos Bengoetxea (Spain)

== Goalscorers ==
There were 46 goals scored in 20 matches, for an average of 2.3 goals per match.

8 goals

- (England) Harry Kane

4 goals

- (Serbia) Aleksandar Mitrović

3 goals

- (Albania) Rey Manaj
- (England) Eberechi Eze

2 goals

- (Albania) Kristjan Asllani
- (Latvia) Vladislavs Gutkovskis
- (Serbia) Dušan Vlahović

1 goal

- (Albania) Myrto Uzuni
- (Andorra) Guillaume López
- (Andorra) Ian Olivera
- (Andorra) Moisés San Nicolás
- (England) Anthony Gordon
- (England) Marc Guéhi
- (England) Reece James
- (England) Ezri Konsa
- (England) Myles Lewis-Skelly
- (England) Noni Madueke
- (England) Marcus Rashford
- (England) Declan Rice
- (England) Bukayo Saka
- (Latvia) Antonijs Černomordijs
- (Latvia) Dario Šits
- (Latvia) Dmitrijs Zelenkovs
- (Serbia) Aleksandar Katai
- (Serbia) Aleksandar Stanković

1 own goal

- (Latvia) Antonijs Černomordijs (against Albania)
- (Latvia) Maksims Toņiševs (against England)

2 own goals

- (Andorra) Christian García (against England and Serbia)

== Discipline ==
A player or team official was automatically suspended for the next match for the following offences:

- Receiving a red card (red card suspensions could be extended for serious offences)
- Receiving two yellow cards in two different matches (yellow card suspensions were carried forward to the play-offs, but not the finals or any other future international matches)

The following suspensions were served during the qualifying matches:

Team	Player	Offence(s)	Suspended for match(es)
Albania	Berat Djimsiti	(yellow card) vs England (21 March 2025); (yellow card) vs Serbia (7 June 2025)	vs Latvia (10 June 2025)
Andorra	Pau Babot	(yellow card) vs Albania (24 March 2025); (yellow card) vs England (6 September 2025)	vs Latvia (11 October 2025)
Andorra	Joel Guillén	(yellow card) (yellow-red card) vs Latvia (11 October 2025)	vs Serbia (14 October 2025)
Andorra	Christian García	(yellow card) vs Latvia (11 October 2025); (yellow card) vs Serbia (14 October 2025)	vs Albania (13 November 2025)
Andorra	Éric Vales	(yellow card) vs Serbia (10 June 2025); (yellow card) vs Serbia (14 October 2025)	vs Albania (13 November 2025)
Andorra	Igor Labaien (assistant manager)	(red card) vs Serbia (14 October 2025)	vs Albania (13 November 2025)
Latvia	Dario Šits	(yellow card) vs Andorra (21 March 2025); (yellow card) vs England (24 March 2025)	vs Albania (10 June 2025)
Latvia	Antonijs Černomordijs	(yellow card) vs Andorra (21 March 2025); (yellow card) vs Albania (10 June 2025)	vs Serbia (6 September 2025)
Latvia	Antonijs Černomordijs	(yellow card) vs Albania (9 September 2025); (yellow card) vs England (14 October 2025)	vs Serbia (16 November 2025)
Latvia	Andrejs Cigaņiks	(yellow card) vs Albania (10 June 2025); (yellow card) vs England (14 October 2025)	vs Serbia (16 November 2025)
Serbia	Nikola Milenković	(red card) vs England (9 September 2025)	vs Albania (11 October 2025)
Serbia	Saša Lukić	(yellow card) vs Latvia (6 September 2025); (yellow card) vs England (9 September 2025)	vs Albania (11 October 2025)
