= 2022 Baltic Cup =

International football competition

Tournament details
- Host country: Estonia; Latvia; Lithuania
- Dates: 16–19 November 2022
- Teams: 4

Final positions
- Champions: Iceland (1st title)
- Runners-up: Latvia
- Third place: Estonia
- Fourth place: Lithuania

Tournament statistics
- Matches played: 4
- Goals scored: 6 (1.5 per match)
- Top scorer(s): (Estonia) Sergei Zenjov (2 goals)

The 2022 Baltic Cup was the 29th Baltic Cup, an international football tournament contested by the Baltic states. Iceland won their first title and was the first guest team in the tournament to win it.

== Format ==
This year Iceland joined Estonia, Latvia, and Lithuania, thus the knock-out tournament format first tried at 2012 Baltic Cup was used. Penalty shoot-outs were used to decide the winner if a match was drawn after 90 minutes.

== Results ==
Semi-finals
16 November – Riga
Latvia (p)	1 (5)
Estonia	1 (3)
16 November – Kaunas
Lithuania	0 (5)
Iceland (p)	0 (6)

Final
19 November – Riga
Latvia	1 (7)
Iceland (p)	1 (8)
Third place
19 November – Tallinn
Estonia	2
Lithuania	0

== Matches ==
=== Latvia vs. Estonia ===
2022 Baltic Cup
16 November 2022
19:00 UTC+2
Semi Final 1

Latvia	1–1	Estonia
Krollis 45+2'; Savaļnieks (yellow card) 16' (yellow-red card) 90+2'	Report	Zenjov 2'
Penalties
J. Ikaunieks (penalty scored); Zjuzins (penalty scored); Jaunzems (penalty scored); D. Ikaunieks (penalty scored); Stuglis (penalty scored)	5–3	(penalty scored) Mets; (penalty scored) Vassiljev; (penalty missed) Zenjov; (penalty scored) Sorga

Daugava Stadium (Riga), Riga
Attendance: 1,657
Referee: Robertas Valikonis (Lithuania)

Latvia	Estonia

=== Lithuania vs. Iceland ===
2022 Baltic Cup
16 November 2022
19:00 UTC+2
Semi Final 2

Lithuania	0–0	Iceland
	Report	Magnússon (yellow card) 81' (yellow-red card) 84'
Penalties
Girdvainis (penalty scored); Gineitis (penalty scored); Novikovas (penalty scored); Golubickas (penalty scored); Baravykas (penalty scored); Žebrauskas (penalty missed)	5–6	(penalty scored) A. Guðjohnsen; (penalty scored) Þórðarson; (penalty scored) Sigurðsson; (penalty scored) Anderson; (penalty scored) Ingason; (penalty scored) Þrándarson

Darius and Girėnas Stadium, Kaunas
Referee: Andris Treimanis (Latvia)

Scoreboard:

Lithuania	Iceland

=== 3rd Place ===
2022 Baltic Cup
19 November 2022
16:00 UTC+2
3rd Place Match

Estonia	2–0	Lithuania
Zenjov 65'; Peetson 89'	Report

A. Le Coq Arena, Tallinn
Attendance: 1,563
Referee: Vitālijs Spasjoņņikovs (Latvia)

=== Final ===
2022 Baltic Cup
19 November 2022
16:00 UTC+2
Final

Latvia	1–1	Iceland
Cigaņiks 67'; Krollis (red card) 27'	Report	Jóhannesson 62' (pen.)
Penalties
J. Ikaunieks (penalty scored); Zjuzins (penalty scored); D. Ikaunieks (penalty scored); Jaunzems (penalty scored); Stuglis (penalty scored); Sorokins (penalty scored); Cigaņiks (penalty scored); Černomordijs (penalty missed)	7–8	(penalty scored) Jóhannesson; (penalty scored) S. Guðjohnsen; (penalty scored) Helgason; (penalty scored) Sigurðsson; (penalty scored) Þórðarson; (penalty scored) Þrándarson; (penalty scored) Ellertsson; (penalty scored) Grétarsson

Daugava Stadium (Riga), Riga
Attendance: 997
Referee: Joonas Jaanovits (Estonia)
