= Moisés San Nicolás =

Andorran footballer

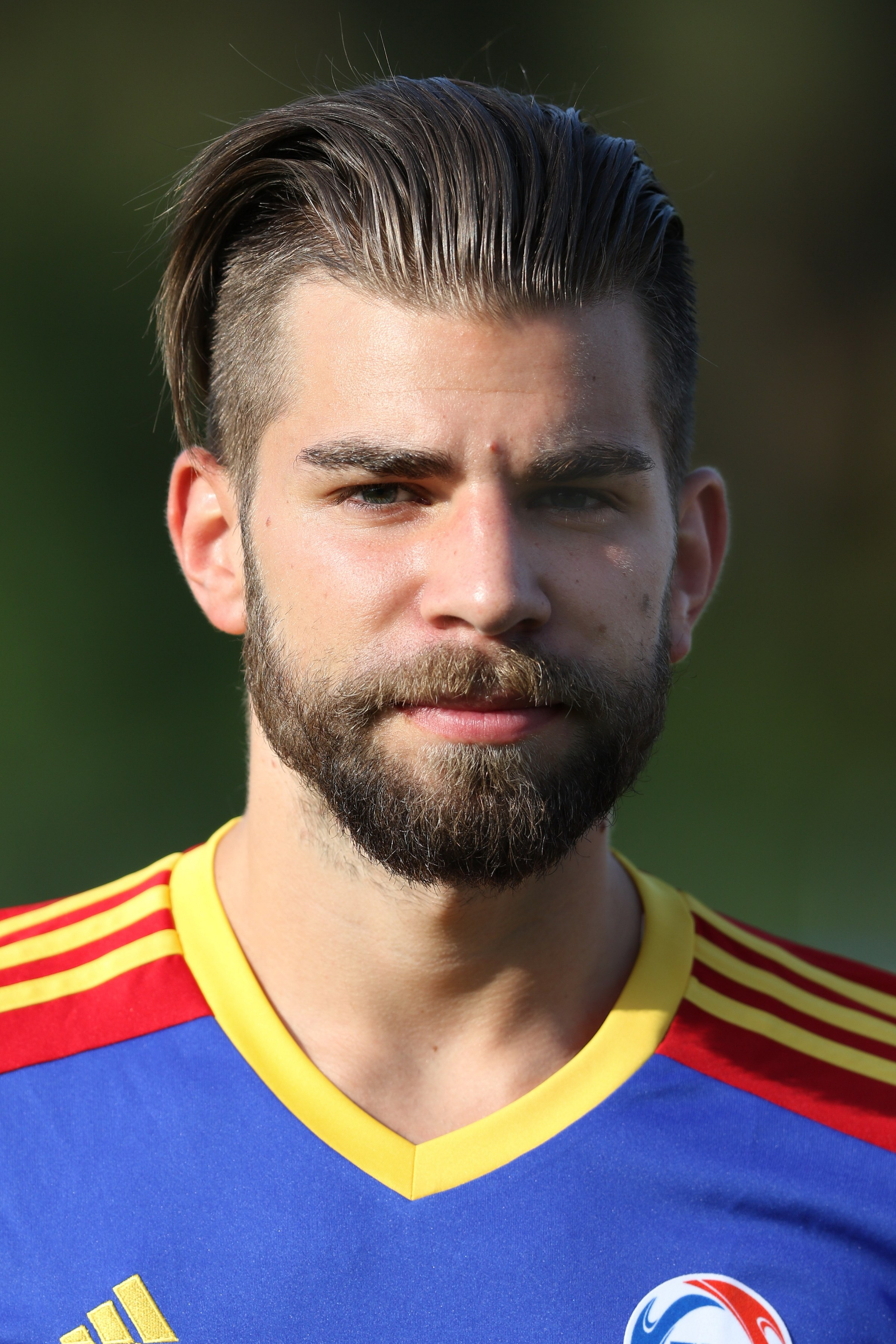
- San Nicolás in 2016

Personal information
- Full name: Moisés San Nicolás Schellens
- Date of birth: 17 September 1993 (age 33)
- Place of birth: Andorra la Vella, Andorra
- Height: 1.88 m (6 ft 2 in)
- Positions: Centre back; right back; right midfielder

Team information
- Current team: FC Santa Coloma
- Number: 23

Youth career
- –2013: FC Andorra

Senior career*
Years	Team	Apps	(Gls)
2011–2014	FC Andorra	42	(1)
2014–2015	Ordino	18	(1)
2015–2017	Lusitanos	41	(1)
2017–2020	FC Santa Coloma	58	(0)
2020–2023	Atlètic d'Escaldes	39	(0)
2023–	FC Santa Coloma	60	(4)

International career^{‡}
2010–2011	Andorra U19	6	(0)
2011–2014	Andorra U21	11	(1)
2012–	Andorra	106	(1)
- * Club domestic league appearances and goals as of 16 May 2026 ‡ National team caps and goals as of 15 November 2026

Moisés San Nicolás Schellens (born 17 September 1993) is an Andorran footballer who plays as a centre back, right back or right midfielder for FC Santa Coloma in the Primera Divisió.

== International career ==
San Nicolás was born in Andorra to an Andorran father and Belgian mother. He plays for the Andorra national team.

== International goals ==
No.	Date	Venue	Opponent	Score	Result	Competition
1.	11 October 2025	Daugava Stadium, Riga, Latvia	Latvia	1–0	2–2	2026 FIFA World Cup qualification

== See also ==
- List of men's footballers with 100 or more international caps
