= Dario Šits =

Latvian footballer (born 2004)

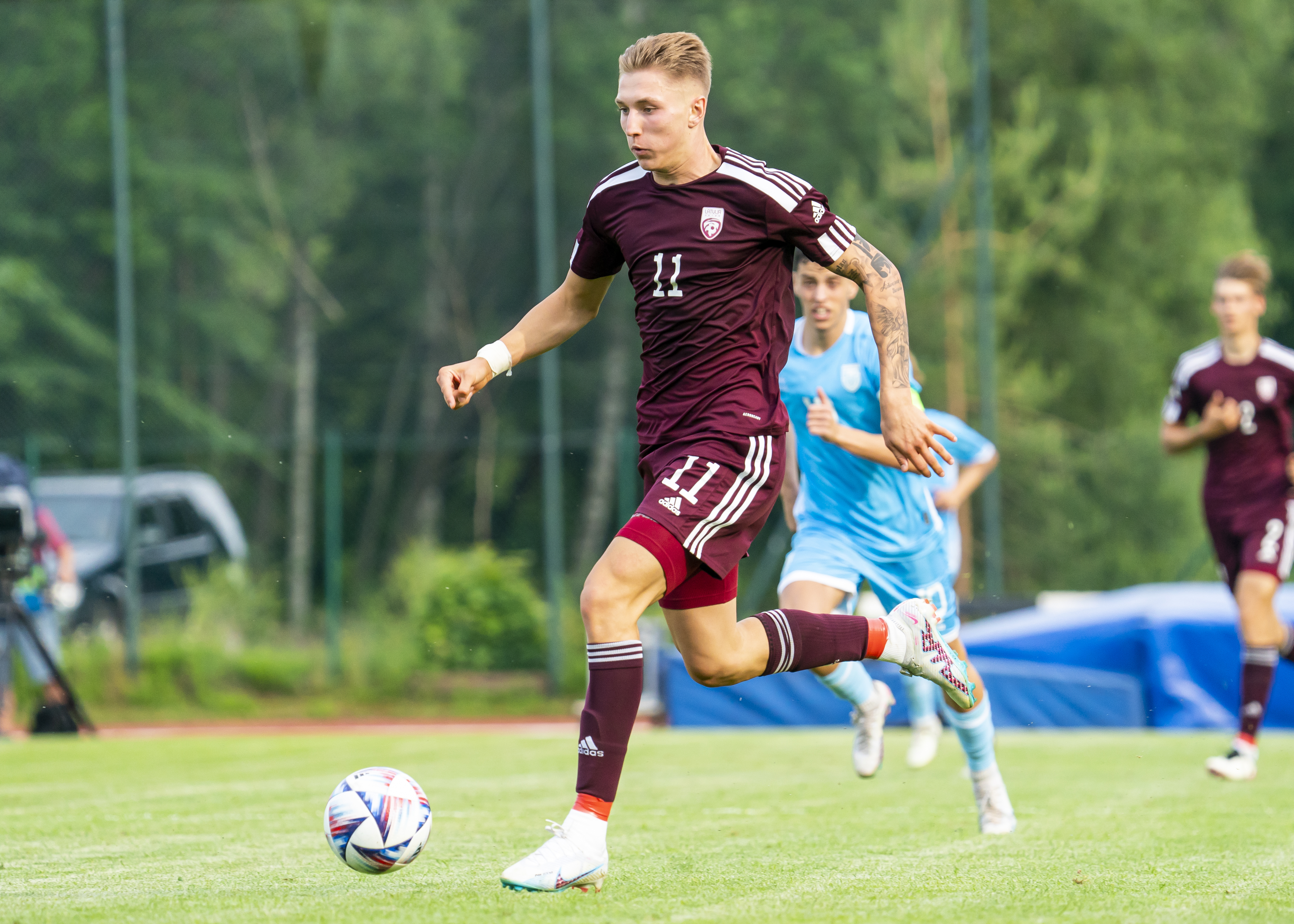
- Picture of Dario Šits

Personal information
- Date of birth: 4 February 2004 (age 22)
- Place of birth: Kuldiga, Latvia
- Height: 1.87 m (6 ft 2 in)
- Position: Striker

Team information
- Current team: Dordrecht
- Number: 77

Youth career
- 2014–2020: Metta
- 2020–2021: Parma

Senior career*
Years	Team	Apps	(Gls)
2021–	Parma	5	(0)
2023–2024	→ SPAL (loan)	1	(0)
2024–2025	→ Helmond Sport (loan)	20	(6)
2025–2026	→ Atlético Madrileño (loan)	20	(0)
2026	→ Dordrecht (loan)	5	(1)
2026–	Dordrecht	1	(0)

International career^{‡}
2019	Latvia U16	4	(4)
2020	Latvia U17	2	(1)
2022	Latvia U19	1	(0)
2022–2024	Latvia U21	4	(1)
2024–	Latvia	12	(2)
- * Club domestic league appearances and goals as of 12:40, 13 November 2026 (UTC) ‡ National team caps and goals as of 9 June 2026

Dario Šits (born 4 February 2004) is a Latvian professional footballer who plays as a striker for Eerste Divisie club Dordrecht, and the Latvia national team. He will join Dordrecht on a permanent transfer at the end of the 2026–27 season.

== Club career ==
Born in Kuldīga, Šits started playing football at FK Metta, before joining Italian side Parma in 2020. Following his performances for the Under-17 and Primavera teams, the forward earned his first call-ups to the club's first team during the 2021–22 season, under head coach Giuseppe Iachini.

On 2 March 2022, Šits made his professional debut for Parma, starting in a 1–1 Serie B draw against AC Monza. On 11 March, shortly after coming on as a substitute in a league match against Cittadella, the forward earned a penalty kick for his side, which was then missed by Juan Brunetta: the fixture ended in a 1–1 draw.

On 6 October of the same year, Šits extended his contract with Parma until 2026.

On 24 August 2023, Šits joined Serie C club SPAL on a season-long loan, with an option to buy in favor of the club and a buy-back clause in favor of Parma. He made his debut for the club on 2 September, starting in a 1–0 league win over Vis Pesaro: however, he suffered an ACL injury in the same game, thus being forced to enter long-term convalescence.

On 18 July 2024, Šits joined Dutch club Helmond Sport on a season-long loan deal, with an option to buy. He made his debut in the opening fixture of the season, starting in a 1–1 home draw against Jong Utrecht in the Eerste Divisie.

On 28 August 2025, Šits joined Spanish club Atlético Madrileño of the Primera Federación on a season-long loan deal, with an option to buy.

On 19 August 2026, Šits moved to Dordrecht in the Dutch second-tier Eerste Divisie on loan. Following the strong start of the 2026–27 season, on 27 September 2026 Dordrecht signed a permanent contract with Šits that will be in place for the 2027–28 season, with an option for the 2028–29 season.

== International career ==
Šits has represented Latvia at various youth international levels, having played for the under-17, under-19 and under-21 national teams.

In October 2024, Dario Šits received his first call-up to the Latvia national football team for the matches against the Faroe Islands and North Macedonia.

On 10 October Dario Šits made his debut for the Latvia national football team in a UEFA Nations League match against North Macedonia, coming on as a substitute in the 17th minute to replace the injured Vladislavs Gutkovskis. This debut came immediately after Paolo Nicolato's first call-up.

In just his second match for the Latvia national team, Dario Šits scored his first goal for the team. Coming on as a substitute in the 66th minute, replacing Jānis Ikaunieks, by the 69th minute, after a fantastic cross from Andrejs Cigaņiks, Dario Šits scored with his first touch.

== International goals ==
No.	Date	Venue	Opponent	Score	Result	Competition
1.	13 October 2024	Tórsvøllur, Tórshavn, Faroe Islands	Faroe Islands	1–1	1–1	2024–25 UEFA Nations League
2.	21 March 2025	Estadi Nacional, Andorra la Vella, Andorra	Andorra	1–0	1–0	2026 FIFA World Cup qualification

== Style of play ==
Šits is a centre-forward, who has been praised mainly for his technical and physical abilities, as well as his speed, his work rate and his finishing. Mainly a right-footed player, he is also capable of using his left foot.

== Career statistics ==
=== Club ===
As of match played 2 September 2023

Appearances and goals by club, season and competition
Club	Season	League			Coppa Italia		Europe		Other		Total	
Club	Season	Division	Apps	Goals	Apps	Goals	Apps	Goals	Apps	Goals	Apps	Goals
Parma	2021–22	Serie B	3	0	0	0	—		—		3	0
Parma	2022–23	Serie B	2	0	1	0	—		—		3	0
Total			5	0	1	0	0	0	0	0	6	0
SPAL (loan)	2023–24	Serie C	1	0	—		—		0	0	1	0
Career total			6	0	1	0	0	0	0	0	7	0
