= Ian Olivera =

Andorran footballer (born 2004)

Personal information
- Full name: Ian Bryan Olivera de Oliveira
- Date of birth: 5 October 2004 (age 22)
- Place of birth: Andorra la Vella, Andorra
- Height: 1.89 m (6 ft 2 in)
- Position: Centre back

Team information
- Current team: Getafe B
- Number: 5

Youth career
- ENFAF
- Atlètic Segre
- Lleida
- Racing Zaragoza

Senior career*
Years	Team	Apps	(Gls)
2023–2024	Calamocha	28	(3)
2024–2025	Salamanca	3	(1)
2025	→ Barbastro (loan)	12	(1)
2025–2026	Numancia	24	(1)
2026–	Getafe B	0	(0)

International career^{‡}
2021–2022	Andorra U19	6	(0)
2023–	Andorra U21	13	(1)
2023–	Andorra	24	(1)
- * Club domestic league appearances and goals as of 3 May 2026 ‡ National team caps and goals as of 15:50, 15 November 2026 (UTC)

Ian Bryan Olivera de Oliveira (born 5 October 2004) is an Andorran footballer who plays as a centre back for Spanish Segunda Federación club Getafe CF B and the Andorra national team.

== Club career ==
Born in Andorra la Vella, Olivera played in the youth teams of Spanish clubs Atlètic Segre, Lleida CF and Racing Club Zaragoza. In 2023, he joined CF Calamocha of the fifth-tier Tercera Federación, also in Aragon.

In August 2024, after having played for Andorra against Spain in a friendly before UEFA Euro 2024, Olivera went on trial at Salamanca CF UDS in the Segunda Federación. The 19-year-old was then signed to the first team. He made his debut on 26 October at home to CD Laredo, entering as a substitute for the last nine minutes and heading in a free kick to conclude a 5–1 win.

On 22 January 2025, having recorded only 123 minutes of play in three games for Salamanca, Olivera was loaned to UD Barbastro in the same league. He played 14 times, including both legs of their successful playoff against relegation, and scored the last-minute only goal of the victory over CD Anguiano on 23 February.

Olivera signed for CD Numancia, again in the fourth tier, on 1 August 2025. He joined on a one-year deal, and took an under-23 quota place. Following a playoff elimination, he joined Getafe CF B in the same league.

== International career ==
Olivera debuted for the Andorra under-19 team at age 17 in 2021, playing European qualifiers. Two years later he was called up for the under-21 team, playing every minute of their six games of 2021.

On 21 November 2023, a month after turning 19, Olivera made his senior debut in a 2–0 home loss to Israel at the end of UEFA Euro 2024 qualifying. He played in a 1–0 home loss to England at the RCDE Stadium near Barcelona on 7 June 2025, in 2026 FIFA World Cup qualification. Wearing only his first name on his shirt, he was serenaded by the England fans, who sang "Stand up if you love Ian" and "Follow Ian away". In another qualifier on 11 October, he headed his first international goal in a 2–2 draw away to Latvia.

Back in the under-21 team on 18 November 2025, Olivera scored in a 4–0 home win over the Republic of Ireland in 2027 UEFA European Under-21 Championship qualification. His team had won three times in their last 85 games.

== International statistics ==
As of match played 13 November 2026

Andorra
Year	Apps	Goals
2023	1	0
2024	6	0
2025	8	1
2026	9	0
Total	24	1

=== International goals ===
No.	Date	Venue	Opponent	Score	Result	Competition
1.	11 October 2025	Daugava Stadium, Riga, Latvia	Latvia	2–2	2–2	2026 FIFA World Cup qualification
