= Dmitrijs Zelenkovs =

Latvian footballer (born 2000)

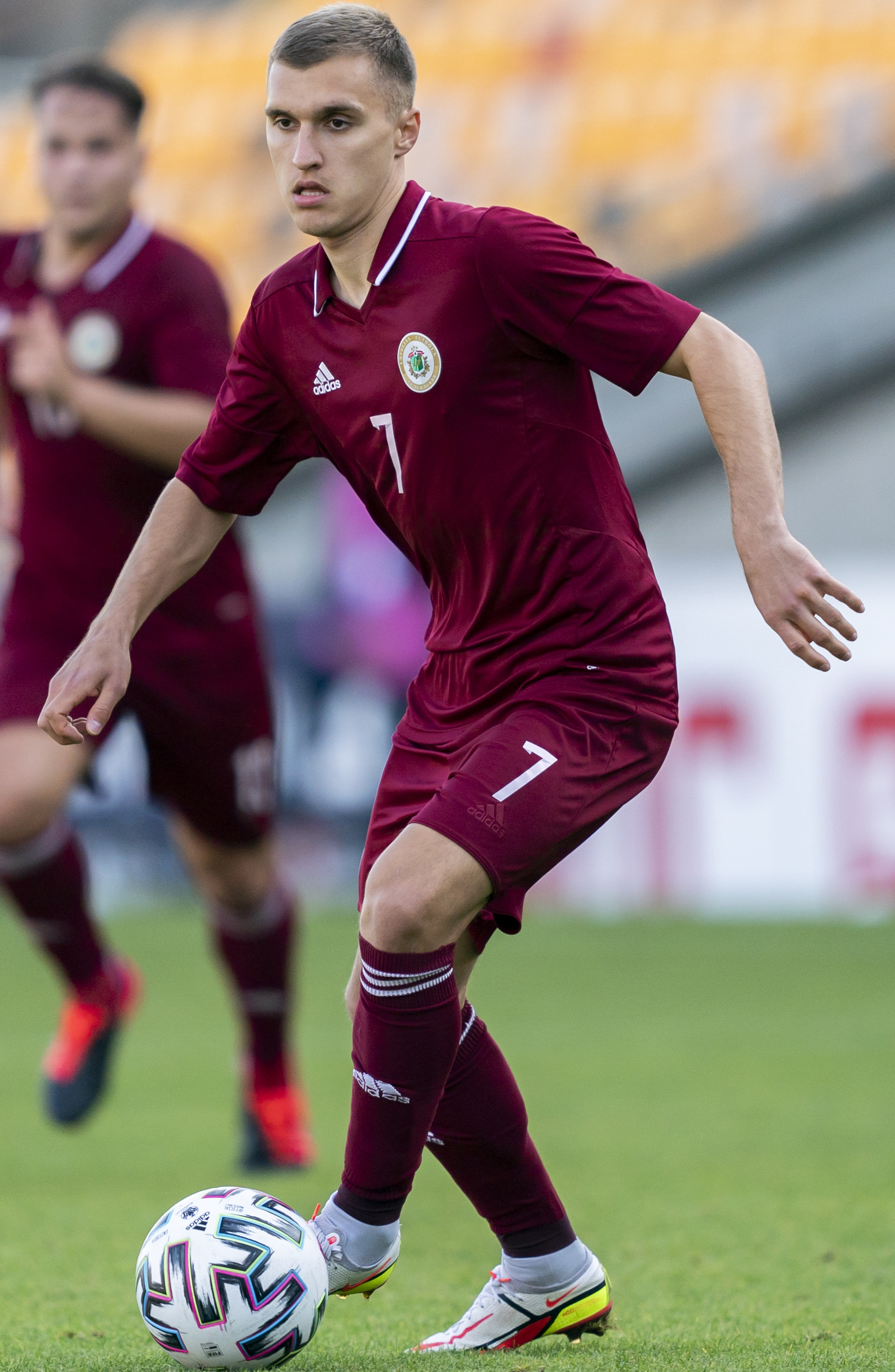
- Zelenkovs with Latvia U21 in 2021

Personal information
- Full name: Dmitrijs Zelenkovs
- Date of birth: 15 May 2000 (age 26)
- Place of birth: Rēzekne, Latvia
- Height: 1.78 m (5 ft 10 in)
- Positions: Midfielder; left-back

Team information
- Current team: RFS
- Number: 18

Youth career
- 2005–2012: Blāzma
- 2013–2014: Liepāja Metalurga
- 2014–2016: Metta
- 2016–2019: Empoli

Senior career*
Years	Team	Apps	(Gls)
2019–2020	Empoli	0	(0)
2021–2022	Metta	11	(0)
2022	Montespaccato Calcio	6	(0)
2022–	RFS	119	(11)

International career^{‡}
2016–2017	Latvia U17	3	
2018–2019	Latvia U19	3	(1)
2019–2023	Latvia U21	13	(0)
2023–	Latvia	30	(1)
- * Club domestic league appearances and goals as of 12 November 2026 ‡ National team caps and goals as of 15 November 2026

Dmitrijs Zelenkovs (born 15 May 2000) is a Latvian professional footballer who plays as a midfielder for Latvian Higher League club RFS and the Latvia national football team.

== Club career ==
He was a youth player of Liepāja Metalurga and FK Metta, before moving to the Empoli Youth Academy in 2016. Zelenkovs played a total of 90 games for Youth Empoli FC, had seven goals and six assists. But he did not manage to make a professional appearance in Serie B and Serie A.

In 2021, Zelenkov returned to FK Metta and made his debut in the Latvian First League, played 11 games.

In 2022, he joined Serie D club Montespaccato Calcio. In the same year, Zelenkov returned to Latvia, he trained with FK RFS for one month before joining the club. In 2023, he became a champion with RFS in the 2023 Latvian Higher League season. The club was then extended his contract to 2027.

== International career ==
Zelenkov has been called up for several Latvian national youth levels such as U16, U17, U19, U21. In June 2023, he was called up to the Latvian national football team for the Euro 2024. On 18 November 2023, he made his debut for the Latvian national team, in a UEFA Euro 2024 qualifying match against Croatia.

== Career statistics ==
=== International ===
Scores and results list Latvia's goal tally first, score column indicates score after each Zelenkovs goal.

List of international goals scored by Dmitrijs Zelenkovs
No.	Date	Venue	Opponent	Score	Result	Competition
1	11 October 2025	Daugava Stadium, Riga, Latvia	Andorra	1–1	2–2	2026 FIFA World Cup qualification

== Honours ==
RFS

- Latvian Higher League: 2023, 2024, 2026
- Latvian Cup: 2024
- Latvian Supercup: 2025

Individual

- Best players of the Latvian Youth Football Championship: 2015
