= Christian García (Andorran footballer) =

Andorran footballer

Personal information
- Full name: Christian García González
- Date of birth: 4 February 1999 (age 27)
- Place of birth: Andorra la Vella, Andorra
- Position: Centre-back

Team information
- Current team: Atlètic d'Escaldes
- Number: 4

Youth career
- –2018: Andorra

Senior career*
| Years | Team | Apps | (Gls) |
| 2018 | Andorra | 0 | (0) |
| 2018–2019 | Ordino | 18 | (1) |
| 2019–2020 | UE Santa Coloma | 16 | (3) |
| 2020–2021 | Alcorcón B | 8 | (1) |
| 2021 | Tarazona | 2 | (1) |
| 2021–2022 | Marchamalo | 12 | (0) |
| 2022–2026 | UE Santa Coloma | 69 | (8) |
| 2026– | Atlètic d'Escaldes | 0 | (0) |

International career^{‡}
| 2014–2015 | Andorra U17 | 6 | (0) |
| 2015–2017 | Andorra U19 | 8 | (0) |
| 2016–2020 | Andorra U21 | 16 | (2) |
| 2020– | Andorra | 33 | (0) |
- * Club domestic league appearances and goals as of 10 May 2026 ‡ National team caps and goals as of 4 October 2026

Christian García González (born 4 February 1999) is an Andorran footballer who plays as a centre-back for Atlètic Club d'Escaldes and the Andorra national team.

== Career ==
García made his international debut for Andorra on 17 November 2020 in the UEFA Nations League against Latvia, being sent off with a second yellow card in the closing moments of the match.

== Career statistics ==
=== International ===
As of 4 October 2026

Andorra
| Year | Apps | Goals |
|---|---|---|
| 2020 | 1 | 0 |
| 2021 | 5 | 0 |
| 2022 | 4 | 0 |
| 2023 | 0 | 0 |
| 2024 | 10 | 0 |
| 2025 | 9 | 0 |
| 2026 | 4 | 0 |
| Total | 33 | 0 |
