= Maksims Toņiševs =

Latvian footballer (born 2000)

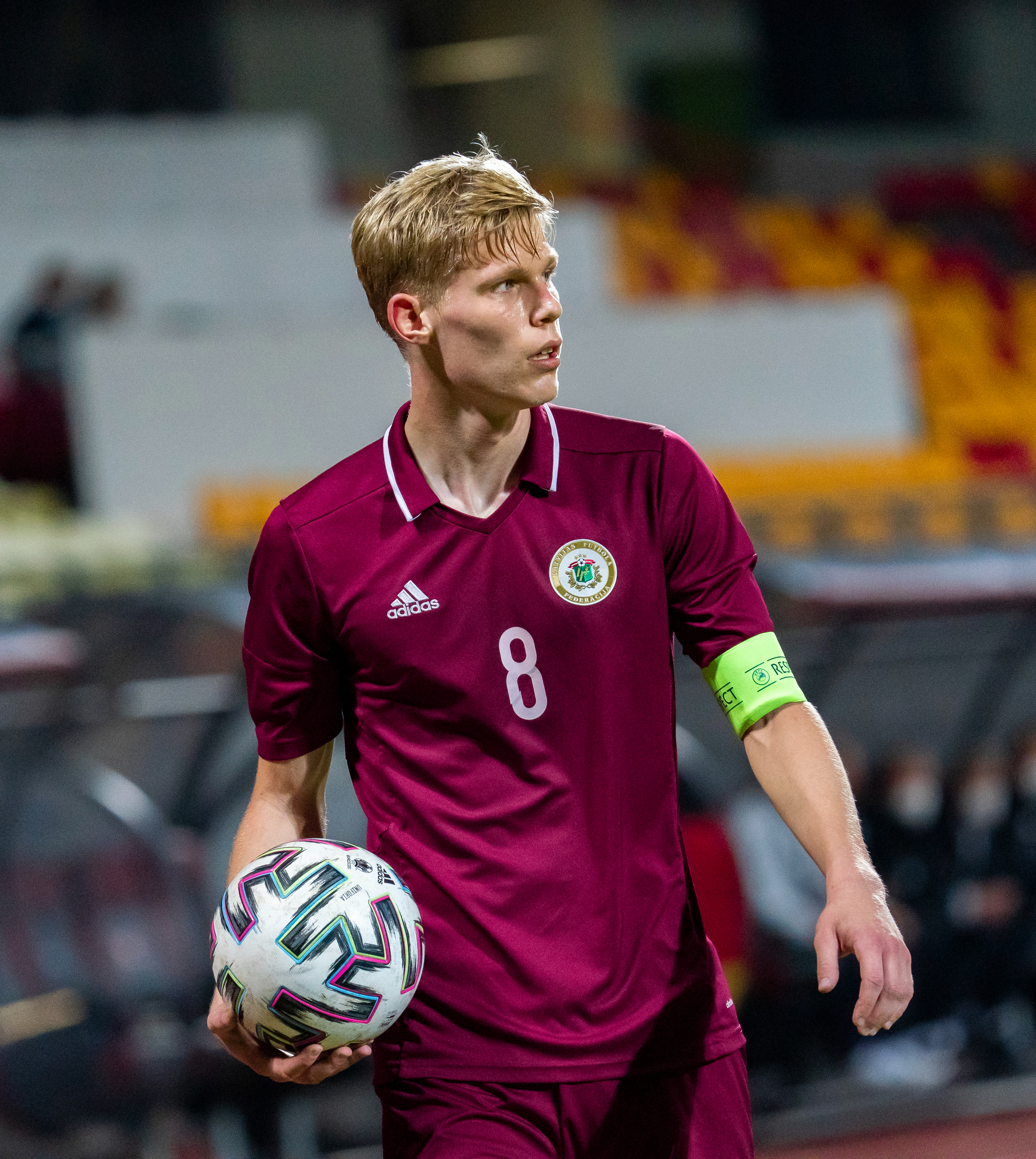

Personal information
- Date of birth: 12 May 2000 (age 26)
- Place of birth: Rīga, Latvia
- Height: 1.84 m (6 ft 0 in)
- Position: Defender

Team information
- Current team: Riga
- Number: 23

Youth career
- Rīgas Futbola skola

Senior career*
Years	Team	Apps	(Gls)
2018–2020	FK RFS	40	(0)
2019–2020	BFC Daugavpils	40	(1)
2021–2024	Valmiera FC	107	(1)
2025–	Riga	50	(1)

International career^{‡}
2016	Latvia U17	3	(1)
2017	Latvia U18	6	(2)
2018	Latvia U19	14	(3)
2019–2022	Latvia U21	19	(0)
2022–	Latvia	12	(1)
- * Club domestic league appearances and goals as of 12 November 2026 ‡ National team caps and goals as of 18 November 2026

Maksims Toņiševs (born 12 May 2000) is a Latvian footballer who plays as a right-back defender for Riga and the Latvia national team.

== Career ==
Toņisevs has been called up for the Latvia on 22 September 2022, but made his international debut for Latvia on 19 June 2023 in the UEFA Euro 2024 qualifying against Armenia, coming on as a substitute in the 65th minute for Alvis Jaunzems.

== International goals ==
List of international goals scored by Maksims Toņiševs
No.	Date	Venue	Opponent	Score	Result	Competition
1.	6 June 2026	Darius and Girėnas Stadium, Kaunas, Lithuania	Lithuania	1–1	1–1 (5–4 p)	2026 Baltic Cup

== Honours ==
Valmiera

- Latvian Higher League: 2022

FK RFS

- Latvian Football Cup: 2019
