= Joel Guillén =

Andorran footballer (born 2001)

Personal information
- Full name: Joel Guillén García
- Date of birth: 28 August 2001 (age 25)
- Place of birth: Andorra la Vella, Andorra
- Height: 1.88 m (6 ft 2 in)
- Position: Centre back

Team information
- Current team: Binéfar
- Number: 5

Youth career
- FC Andorra

Senior career*
| Years | Team | Apps | (Gls) |
| 2019–2020 | EFAC | 12 | (1) |
| 2020 | Alpicat | 1 | (1) |
| 2020–2021 | Mollerussa | 8 | (0) |
| 2021–2022 | Tàrrega | 23 | (0) |
| 2022–2023 | Monzón | 22 | (1) |
| 2023– | Binéfar | 58 | (0) |

International career^{‡}
| 2022– | Andorra | 24 | (0) |
- * Club domestic league appearances and goals as of 8 March 2026 ‡ National team caps and goals as of 15 November 2026

Joel Guillén García (born 28 August 2001) is an Andorran footballer who plays as a centre back for Spanish Tercera Federación club CD Binéfar and the Andorra national team.

== Club career ==
Born in Andorra la Vella, Guillén was a youth player at FC Andorra. He then moved to Spain to play in the Primera Catalana for EFAC Almacelles, Atlètic Alpicat, CFJ Mollerussa and UE Tàrrega. After one season with Atlético Monzón in the fifth-tier Tercera Federación, playing alongside compatriots Izan Fernández and Márcio Vieira, he moved in July 2023 to CD Binéfar in the same league and also in Aragon.

== International career ==
Guillén was chosen for the Andorra under-16 team that won the UEFA Development Tournament in Malta in 2017. He scored in a 2–0 win over the host team as Andorra finished with two wins and a draw.

In September 2022, Guillén was called up for the Andorra national team for the first time by manager Koldo Álvarez, ahead of UEFA Nations League matches away to Liechtenstein and at home to Latvia. He made his debut on 16 November that year, in a 1–0 friendly loss to Austria in Málaga. He was one of four Andorran debutants at the Estadio La Rosaleda that night, and the only one to play the full 90 minutes.

On 11 October 2025, Andorra earned their first point of 2026 FIFA World Cup qualification with a 2–2 draw away to Latvia, though Guillén was sent off in added time.

== International statistics ==
As of match played 15 November 2026

Andorra
| Year | Apps | Goals |
|---|---|---|
| 2022 | 2 | 0 |
| 2023 | 5 | 0 |
| 2024 | 7 | 0 |
| 2025 | 4 | 0 |
| 2026 | 6 | 0 |
| Total | 24 | 0 |
