= Artūrs Zjuzins =

Latvian footballer (born 1991)

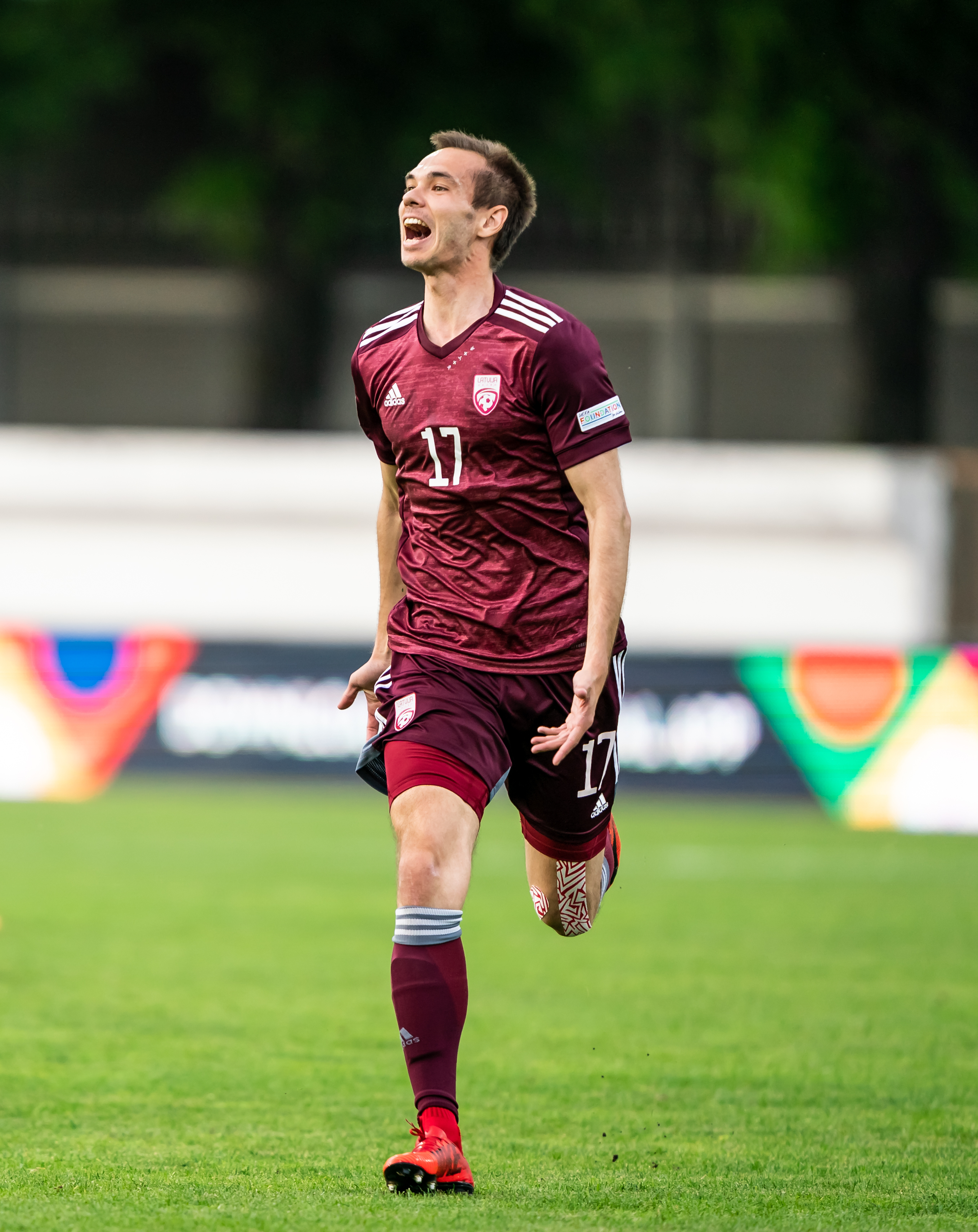

Personal information
- Date of birth: 18 June 1991 (age 35)
- Place of birth: Riga, Latvia
- Height: 1.82 m (6 ft 0 in)
- Position: Midfielder

Team information
- Current team: Grobiņa
- Number: 17

Youth career
- Jūrmala-VV

Senior career*
Years	Team	Apps	(Gls)
2007–2009	Ventspils	2	(0)
2009–2010	Tranzīts	17	(1)
2010–2011	Ventspils	20	(2)
2011	Žilina	5	(1)
2011–2015	Baltika Kaliningrad	106	(9)
2015–2016	Gazovik Orenburg	15	(0)
2016	Tambov	13	(0)
2017–2018	Riga	2	(0)
2018–2024	RFS	110	(13)
2024	Liepāja	5	(0)
2024–2025	Daugavpils	12	(0)
2025–2026	Nybergsund	32	(0)
2026–	Grobiņa	2	(0)

International career^{‡}
2009–2010	Latvia U19	8	(3)
2010–2012	Latvia U21	13	(1)
2012–2024	Latvia	61	(9)
- * Club domestic league appearances and goals as of 12 November 2026 ‡ National team caps and goals as of 6 March 2025

Artūrs Zjuzins (born 18 June 1991) is a Latvian football midfielder who plays for Grobiņa.

== Club career ==
In his youth career Artūrs Zjuzins played for Jūrmala-VV, signing his first professional contract in 2007 with Ventspils. He played only 2 matches there, being sent to Tranzit in 2009. He played 17 matches there, scoring 1 goal. In 2010, he was taken back to Ventspils. Elected as the team's captain he played 20 matches that season, scoring 2 goals. In January 2011 it was reported that Zjuzins hadn't been let to join Lazio for €425'000. In March 2011 Zjuzins signed a contract with MŠK Žilina, playing in the Slovak Corgoň Liga. It was reported then, that the player had joined the club illegally, with no permission from Ventspils, but the situation was solved calmly and the player was let to join the Slovak side. He made his debut for Žilina against Košice on 15 March 2011, he also scored his first goal for the club then. Despite some good performances, he was released after the season. In August 2011 he was signed by the Russian National Football League team Baltika Kaliningrad as a free agent. During his first season in Kaliningrad Zjuzins scored 3 goals in 19 matches. The second season saw him score once in 25 games.

== International career ==
Zjuzins has represented Latvia at both U-19 and U-21 levels. He received his first full international call-up for Latvia in 2012 for a friendly match against Kazakhstan on 29 February. Zjuzins scored his first international goal for Latvia in a 1–1 friendly match draw against Estonia on 14 August 2013. That was the debut match for Marians Pahars as the national team's manager. Zjuzins scored for the second match in a row on 6 September 2013, when Latvia beat Lithuania 2–1 in a 2014 FIFA World Cup qualifying match.

=== International goals ===
As of match played 6 June 2022. Latvia score listed first, score column indicates score after each Zjuzins goal.

International goals by date, venue, cap, opponent, score, result and competition
No.	Date	Venue	Cap	Opponent	Score	Result	Competition
1	14 August 2013	A. Le Coq Arena, Tallinn, Estonia	8	Estonia	1–1	1–1	Friendly
2	6 September 2013	Skonto Stadium, Riga, Latvia	9	Lithuania	2–0	2–1	2014 FIFA World Cup qualification
3	6 September 2015	Skonto Stadium, Riga, Latvia	24	Czech Republic	1–2	1–2	UEFA Euro 2016 qualifying
4	1 June 2016	Daugava Stadium, Liepāja, Latvia	30	Lithuania	1–0	2–1	2016 Baltic Cup
5	2 September 2016	Skonto Stadium, Riga, Latvia	32	Luxembourg	2–1	3–1	Friendly
6	2 September 2016	Skonto Stadium, Riga, Latvia	32	Luxembourg	3–1	3–1	Friendly
7	13 November 2016	Estádio Nacional, Lisbon, Portugal	36	Portugal	1–1	4–1	2018 FIFA World Cup qualification
8	6 June 2022	Daugava Stadium, Riga, Latvia	53	Liechtenstein	1–0	1–0	2022–23 UEFA Nations League D
9	22 March 2023	Aviva Stadium, Dublin, Republic of Ireland	58	Republic of Ireland	2-2	3-2	Friendly

== Honours ==
Ventspils

- Latvian Higher League (2): 2007, 2008
- Latvian Cup (1): 2007

Latvia

- Baltic Cup (1): 2012
