= Antonijs Černomordijs =

Latvian footballer (born 1996)

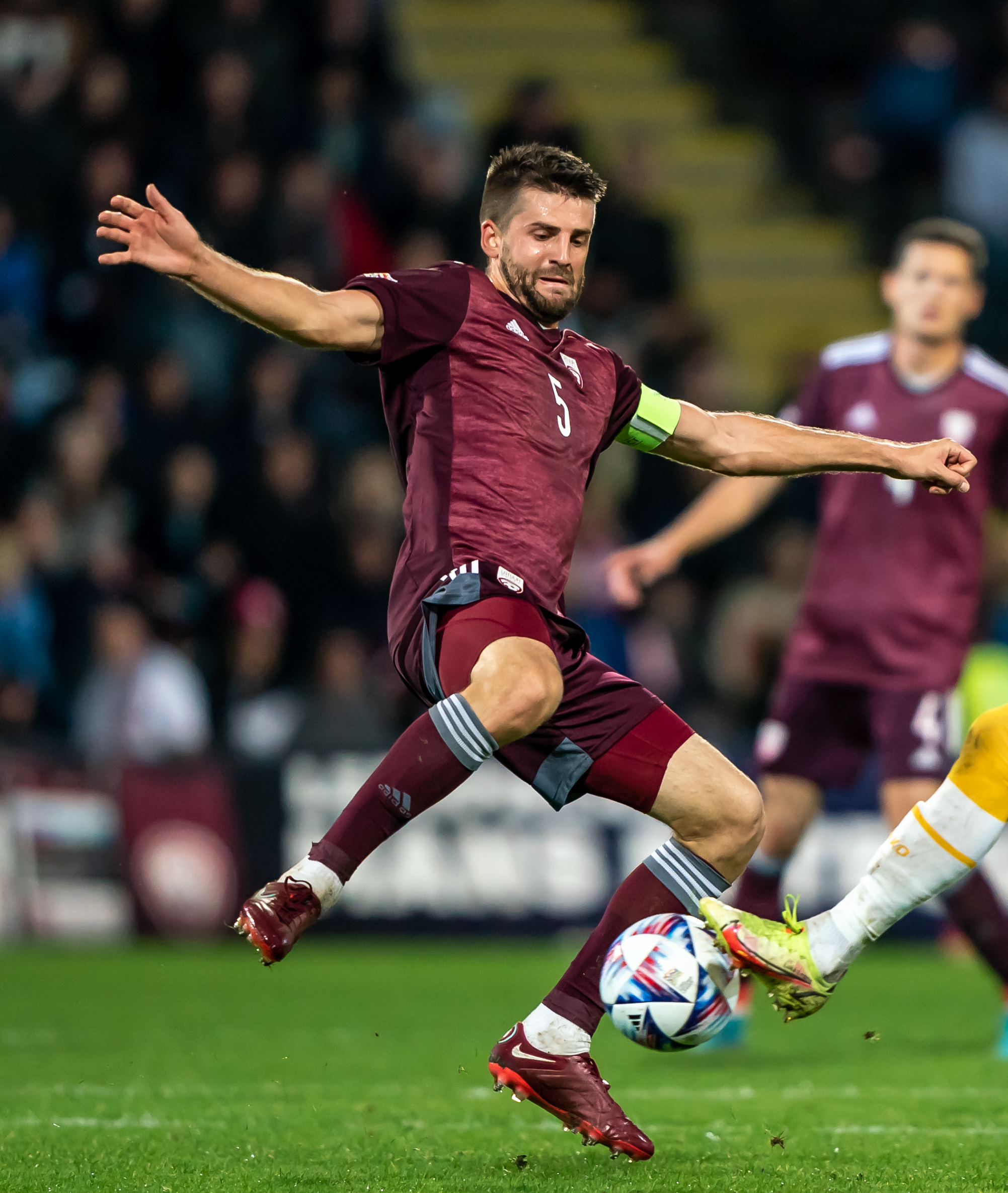
- Černomordijs with Latvia in 2022

Personal information
- Date of birth: 26 September 1996 (age 30)
- Place of birth: Daugavpils, Latvia
- Height: 1.90 m (6 ft 3 in)
- Position: Defender

Team information
- Current team: Riga
- Number: 34

Youth career
- BFC Daugavpils

Senior career*
Years	Team	Apps	(Gls)
2014–2016	Daugavpils	25	(1)
2014–2016	→ Lech Poznań II (loan)	22	(1)
2016–	Riga	239	(17)
2017	→ Pafos (loan)	1	(0)

International career^{‡}
2014	Latvia U19	11	(1)
2015–2018	Latvia U21	29	(1)
2019–	Latvia	54	(3)
- * Club domestic league appearances and goals as of 12 November 2026 ‡ National team caps and goals as of 17:46, 15 November 2026 (UTC)

Antonijs Černomordijs (born 26 September 1996) is a Latvian professional footballer who plays as a defender for and captains both Virslīga club Riga and the Latvia national team.

== Club career ==
He made his Cypriot First Division debut for Pafos on 26 August 2017 in a game against Ethnikos Achna.

== International career ==
He made his debut for Latvia national football team on 6 September 2019 in a 2020 Euro qualifier against Austria, as a starter.

== Career statistics ==
=== International ===
As of match played 15 November 2026

Appearances and goals by national team and year
National team	Year	Apps	Goals
Latvia
Latvia	2019	4	0
Latvia	2020	4	1
Latvia	2021	11	0
Latvia	2022	9	0
Latvia	2023	6	0
Latvia	2024	4	0
Latvia	2025	7	1
Latvia	2026	9	1
Total		54	3

Scores and results list Latvia's goal tally first, score column indicates score after each Černomordijs goal.

List of international goals scored by Antonijs Černomordijs
No.	Date	Venue	Opponent	Score	Result	Competition
1	17 November 2020	Estadi Nacional, Andorra la Vella, Andorra	Andorra	1–0	5–0	2020–21 UEFA Nations League D
2	10 June 2025	Skonto Stadium, Riga, Latvia	Albania	1–0	1–1	2026 FIFA World Cup qualification
3	31 March 2026	Skonto Stadium, Riga, Latvia	Gibraltar	1–0	1–0	2024–25 UEFA Nations League promotion/relegation play-offs

== Honours ==
Riga

- Virslīga: 2018, 2019, 2020, 2025
- Latvian Cup: 2018, 2023
- Latvian Supercup: 2024, 2026
