= Alvis Jaunzems =

Latvian footballer (born 1999)

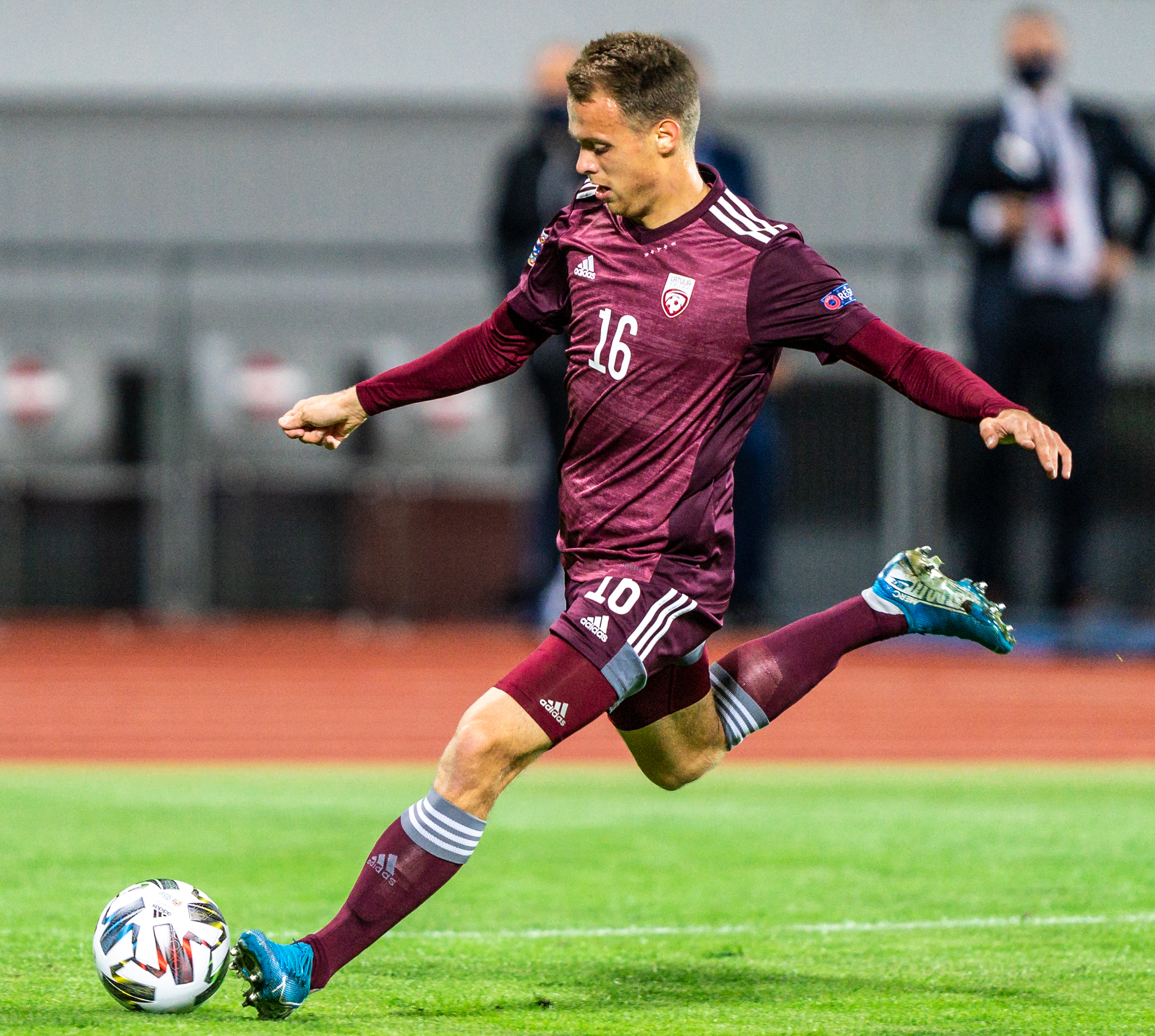
- Jaunzems playing for Latvia in 2020

Personal information
- Full name: Alvis Jaunzems
- Date of birth: 16 June 1999 (age 27)
- Place of birth: Staicele, Latvia
- Height: 1.79 m (5 ft 10 in)
- Positions: Right-back; midfielder

Team information
- Current team: Auda

Senior career*
Years	Team	Apps	(Gls)
2015–2016	Staiceles Bebri	57	(3)
2017–2023	Valmiera	158	(13)
2023–2025	Stal Mielec	57	(2)
2025–2026	Lechia Gdańsk	9	(0)
2026–	Auda	0	(0)

International career^{‡}
2018	Latvia U19	3	(0)
2018–2019	Latvia U21	10	(0)
2020–	Latvia	46	(0)
- * Club domestic league appearances and goals as of 11:33, 20 March 2026 (UTC) ‡ National team caps and goals as of 15:08, 6 September 2025 (UTC)

Alvis Jaunzems (born 16 June 1999) is a Latvian professional footballer who plays as a right-back for Virslīga club Auda.

== International career ==
Jaunzems made his international debut for Latvia on 3 September 2020 in the UEFA Nations League against Andorra, coming on as a substitute in the 81st minute for Artūrs Zjuzins, with the match finishing as a 0–0 draw.

== Career statistics ==
=== International ===
As of match played 6 September 2025

Appearances and goals by national team and year
National team	Year	Apps	Goals
Latvia
Latvia	2020	6	0
Latvia	2021	10	0
Latvia	2022	9	0
Latvia	2023	10	0
Latvia	2024	6	0
Latvia	2025	5	0
Total		46	0

== Honours ==
Valmiera

- Latvian Higher League: 2022
