= Andrejs Cigaņiks =

Latvian footballer (born 1997)

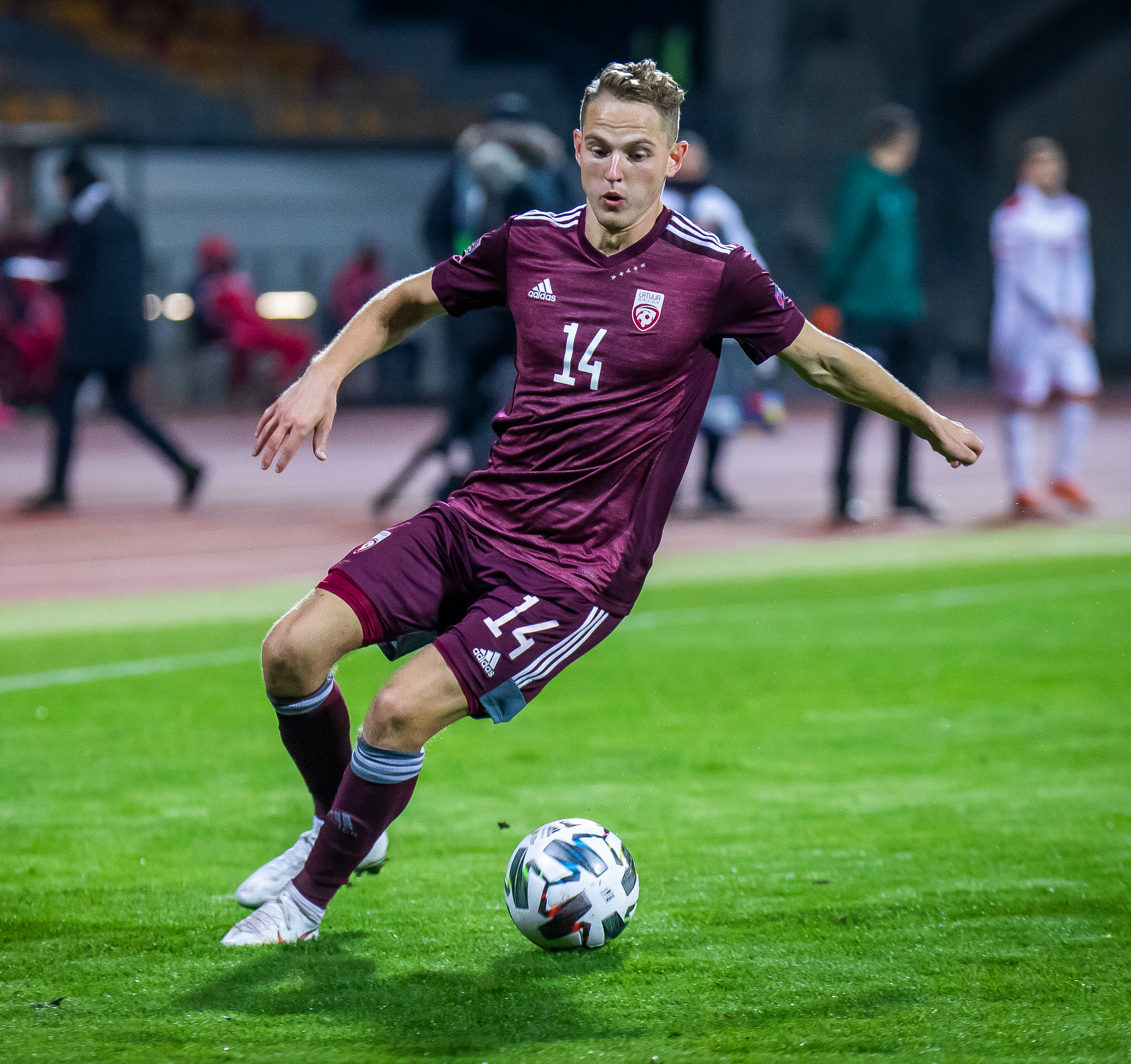
- Cigaņiks with Latvia in 2020

Personal information
- Date of birth: 12 April 1997 (age 29)
- Place of birth: Riga, Latvia
- Height: 1.73 m (5 ft 8 in)
- Positions: Left winger; wing-back

Team information
- Current team: Luzern
- Number: 14

Youth career
- Skonto FC
- 2013–2016: Bayer Leverkusen

Senior career*
Years	Team	Apps	(Gls)
2016–2017	Bayer Leverkusen	0	(0)
2016–2017	→ Viktoria Köln (loan)	4	(1)
2017–2018	Schalke 04 II	20	(5)
2018–2019	SC Cambuur	27	(0)
2019	RFS	14	(1)
2020–2021	Zorya Luhansk	21	(0)
2021–2023	DAC Dunajská Streda	38	(2)
2023–2024	Widzew Łódź	43	(4)
2024–	Luzern	73	(5)

International career^{‡}
2012	Latvia U16	2	(2)
2012–2013	Latvia U17	6	(0)
2014–2015	Latvia U19	7	(0)
2015–2018	Latvia U21	15	(1)
2018–	Latvia	78	(4)
- * Club domestic league appearances and goals as of 22:32, 12 November 2026 (UTC) ‡ National team caps and goals as of 17:44, 15 November 2026 (UTC)

Andrejs Cigaņiks (born 12 April 1997) is a Latvian professional footballer who plays as a left winger or wing-back for Swiss club Luzern and the Latvia national team.

== Club career ==
Born in Riga, Cigaņiks started playing football in the youth teams of Skonto FC, before signing for German club Bayer Leverkusen in 2013. In June 2016 he was loaned to Viktoria Köln, before playing for Schalke 04 II. Cigaņiks transferred to Dutch club SC Cambuur in July 2018.

He returned to Latvia in 2019 and spent the second half of the season at Premier League club RFS. In January 2020, he signed a two-and-a-half-year contract with Ukrainian Premier League club Zorya Luhansk. In July 2021 he signed for Slovak club DAC Dunajská Streda.

On 2 January 2023, Cigaņiks joined Polish Ekstraklasa side Widzew Łódź on a deal until June 2024, with an option to extend for another year. On 10 February 2024, he penned a new contract, keeping him with the club until mid-2026.

On 5 July 2024, Swiss Super League club Luzern announced the signing of Cigaņiks on a three-year contract, for an undisclosed fee.

== International career ==
After playing for the Latvian youth teams, he made his senior international debut for Latvia on 13 October 2018, appearing as a substitute in the 67th minute, against Kazakhstan in the UEFA Nations League match. He scored his first goal for the national team on 1 September 2021 against Gibraltar in the 2022 FIFA World Cup qualifiers.

== Personal life ==
Cigaņiks's father is from Ukraine and is a cousin of Ukrainian sports journalist and commentator Ihor Tsyhanyk.

== Career statistics ==
=== International ===
As of match played 15 November 2026

Appearances and goals by national team and year
National team	Year	Apps	Goals
Latvia
Latvia	2018	4	0
Latvia	2019	4	0
Latvia	2020	8	0
Latvia	2021	13	1
Latvia	2022	10	1
Latvia	2023	10	0
Latvia	2024	10	2
Latvia	2025	9	0
Latvia	2026	10	0
Total		78	4

Scores and results list Latvia's goal tally first, score column indicates score after each Ciganiks goal.

List of international goals scored by Andrejs Ciganiks
No.	Date	Venue	Opponent	Score	Result	Competition
1	1 September 2021	Daugava Stadium, Riga, Latvia	Gibraltar	3–1	3–1	2022 FIFA World Cup qualification
2	19 November 2022	Daugava Stadium, Riga, Latvia	Iceland	1–1	1–1 (8–9 p)	2022 Baltic Cup final
3	21 March 2024	AEK Arena, Larnaca, Cyprus	Cyprus	1–1	1–1	Friendly
4	11 June 2024	Daugava Stadium, Liepāja, Latvia	Faroe Islands	1–0	1–0	2024 Baltic Cup third place match
