= Skonto Stadium =

Football stadium in Riga, Latvia

Coordinates: 56°57′41″N 24°6′59″E

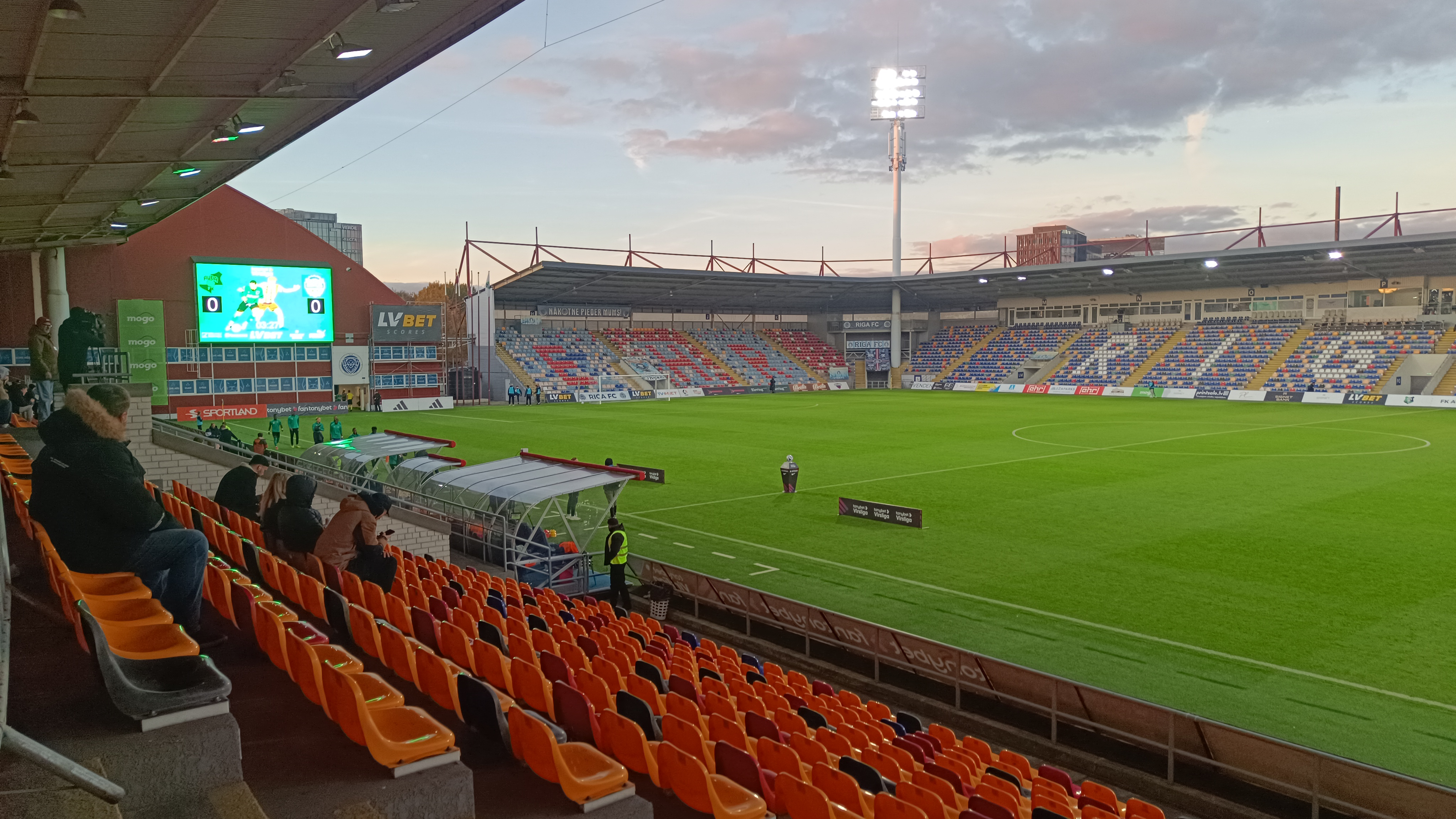
- Interactive map of Skonto Stadium
- Location: E. Melngaiļa 1a, Riga, Latvia
- Capacity: 10,471 (concerts), 7,255 (football)

Construction
- Opened: June 28, 2000

Tenants
- Skonto FC (2000–2016); Latvia national football team (2000–2017, 2022–present); Riga FC (2016–present)

Skonto Stadium (Latvian: Skonto stadions) is a football stadium in Riga, Latvia. The stadium was built in 2000 and currently has 8,087 seats in total (open for spectators & VIP guests on matchdays). It is the second largest stadium in Latvia, behind Daugava Stadium, also in Riga. The stadium design incorporates Skonto Hall.

== Description ==
Skonto Stadium is located in the heart of Riga at 1a E. Melngaiļa Street. It is the second biggest football stadium in the country with 8,087 seats, VIP lounges, offices, a press centre and cafes.

== Use ==
Skonto Stadium is mostly used for hosting football matches. Since its opening in 2000, it has been the home stadium for the Latvian Higher League club Skonto Riga and the Latvia national football team, as well as Latvia U-21, while Daugava Stadium was scheduled for renovation.

The team returned to the Daugava after renovations in the summer of 2018. However, since the fall of 2022 home matches were once again moved to Skonto Stadium due to problems with the grass pitch and other issues. Works on replacing and upgrading the pitch began in October 2023. At the time, Latvian Football Federation president Vadims Ļašenko said that Skonto would become the main home of the men's team, with Daugava serving as a backup and the venue for the women's and youth national teams.

International artists have performed at this venue, including Aerosmith in 2007 and Metallica in 2008, both of whom reached the maximum capacity for concerts, with 32,000 and 33,000 fans, respectively. Several other artists have performed there too, for example, Snoop Dogg, Massive Attack, Depeche Mode and Akon.

In 2003, Skonto stadium hosted the Grand Dance Concert of the Latvian Song and Dance Festival, and in 2008 a friendly match between Latvian and Georgian football veterans was played at this venue.

In 2009, Latvian football club FK Ventspils used this stadium for its home matches in the UEFA Europa League matches, because of technical problems with its own stadium.

In October 2026, the stadium was reported to be sold to real-estate company Invego, with plans to allow tenants to use the stadium for football for the next five years, demolish the stadium and redevelop it into housing after the finalisation of the future national stadium project.

== Attendance ==
The largest attendance seen by the Skonto Stadium in a football match was 9,000 people in 2003 for the UEFA Euro 2004 qualifying playoff game between Latvia and Turkey.
