= Daugava Stadium (Riga) =

Stadium and sports complex in Riga, Latvia

Coordinates: 56.9550°N 24.1588°E

BTA Daugava Stadium
- BTA Daugavas stadions
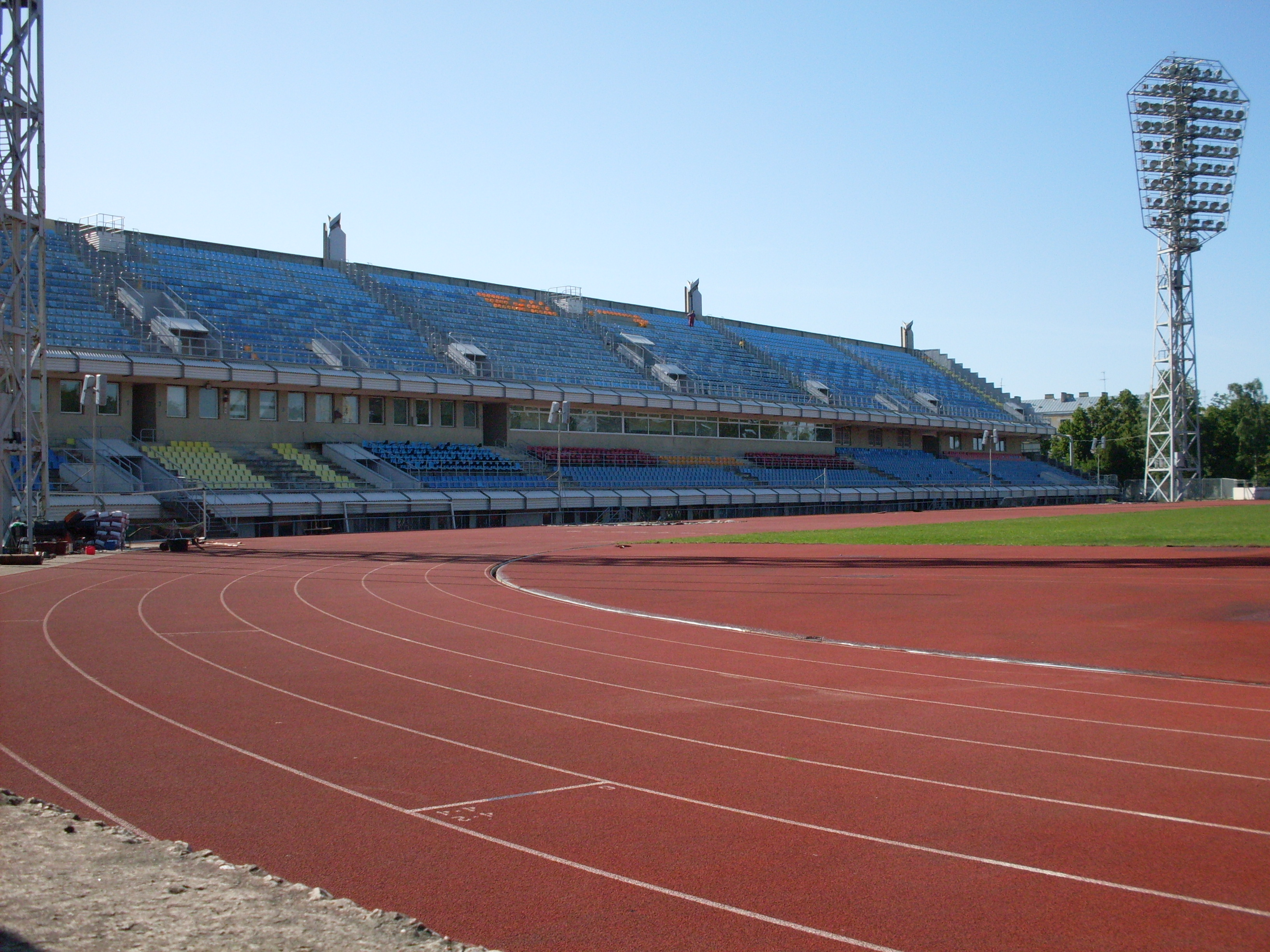
- Stadium in 2016; UEFA Category 4 Stadium
- Interactive map of BTA Daugava Stadium
- Address: Augšiela 1, Rīga, LV-1009
- Location: Grīziņkalns, Riga, Latvia
- Owner: SIA "Latvijas Nacionālais sporta centrs"
- Capacity: 10,461
- Surface: Grass
- Scoreboard: Yes

Construction
- Opened: 1927
- Renovated: 2017–2023

Tenants
- Latvia national football team (1991–2000; 2018–2022; rare matches afterwards); FK Metta (2018–2022, 2024); FK RFS (2024–2025; for European cups - League phase)

Website
- http://www.daugavasstadions.lv/

Daugava National Stadium (Latvian: Daugavas stadions), also known as the BTA Daugava Stadium for sponsorship reasons, is a multifunctional stadium in Riga, Latvia, which was first opened in 1927. It holds football and athletics competitions in addition to others in the adjacent arenas of the complex. Since 1992 the Daugava Stadium has been designated as a sports facility of national importance. It is owned by the Government of Latvia. Although very small (by European standards), it is the largest stadium in the country.

== History ==
The first stadium on the location was built in 1927 and was first operated by the Strādnieku sports un sargs (Worker Sports and Guard, SSS) sports organization affiliated with the Latvian Social Democratic Workers Party. After the stadium had been abandoned after the Soviet occupation of Latvia in 1940, the stadium was re-established in 1945, with renovation works beginning in 1949. Before July 1990 the total capacity of the stadium was more than 10,000 people, but after the demolition of the north, east and south stands in 1999 it was reduced to 5,683.

The Latvia national football team were playing its home games at the Daugava stadium from 1991 until 2000, when Skonto Stadium was unveiled as a temporary venue while the planned renovation of Daugava Stadium was underway, with the team returning to Daugava in June of 2018. However, since the autumn of 2022 home matches were once again moved to Skonto Stadium due to problems with the grass pitch and other issues. Works on replacing and upgrading the pitch began in October 2023. At the time, Latvian Football Federation president Vadims Ļašenko said that Skonto would become the main home of the men's team, with Daugava serving as a backup and the venue for the women's and youth national teams. The Daugava stadium has since hosted occasional matches of the national team.

The second tenant since June 2018 – FS Metta/LU – moved back to Riga Hanza Secondary School Stadium at the same time. A possible reason were complaints voiced by a number of local football clubs and athletes that rent of the stadium was too expensive. Metta returned to the Daugava Stadium in the summer of 2024, but moved back to Hanza Secondary School and the Sloka Stadium in Jūrmala for the 2025 season. THe stadium was also used by FK RFS Riga for its European league matches in 2024/25 as their home venue (LNK sporta parks) lacks the proper certification. Previous tenants have included FC Daugava, FK Daugava 90, JFK Olimps and others.

Two exercise venues under the main stand, tennis and athletics grounds and artificial turf pitches are also a part of the complex. The Latvian Football Federation headquarters were located within the complex from 1991 until 2009, when the offices were moved to the Elektrum Olympic Center. The Daugava Stadium has traditionally hosted the dance performances of the Latvian Song and Dance Festival.

To celebrate the 90th anniversary of the independence of Latvia, on October 19, 2008, a new Guinness World Record was set at the venue for the most people running 100 metres in a 24-hour relay. There were 3,807 participants.

On September 27, 2022, four state-owned sports institutions – stadium manager VSIA Kultūras un sporta centrs “Daugavas stadions” (Daugava Stadium Culture and Sports Centre), Sigulda Bobsleigh and Luge Track, Lielupe Tennis Centre (Tenisa centrs "Lielupe") in Jūrmala and Mežaparks Sports Center (Sporta centrs "Mežaparks") – were reorganized and merged, creating the Latvian National Sports Centre (SIA Latvijas Nacionālais sporta centrs, LNSC). The centre also oversees the new and adjacent BTA Daugava Athletics Arena and Daugava Ice Hall.

== Facilities ==
Since September 2022, the sports complex that encompasses the stadium, is managed by the Latvian National Sports Centre (LNSC). The LNSC thus includes these venues at Augšiela 1:

- the BTA Daugava Stadium (BTA Daugavas stadions) - the original stadium, used for association football, track and field etc.;
- the BTA Daugava Athletics Arena (BTA Daugavas vieglatlētikas manēža) - opened early 2024, used for indoor athletics;
- the Daugava Ice Hall (Daugavas ledus halle) - opened May 2021, used for ice hockey and ice rink sports;
- (under development) Athletics and Football Training Grounds with an inflatable hall.

The venues managed by the LNSC that are located outside of the Daugava complex are:

- the Team Sports Games Hall (Komandu sporta spēļu halle), built 2022-2024, mostly used for basketball and volleyball (located on Krišjāņa Barona iela in Grīziņkalns, central Riga);
- the Lielupe Tennis Centre (Tenisa centrs "Lielupe"), founded 1932 in Lielupe, Jūrmala;
- the Sigulda Bobsleigh and Luge Track (Bobsleja un kamaniņu trase “Sigulda”), built 1984-1986 in Sigulda, Sigulda Municipality;
- the Mežaparks Sports Centre (Sporta centrs "Mežaparks"), established 2002, (located in Mežaparks, Riga).

== Renovation projects ==
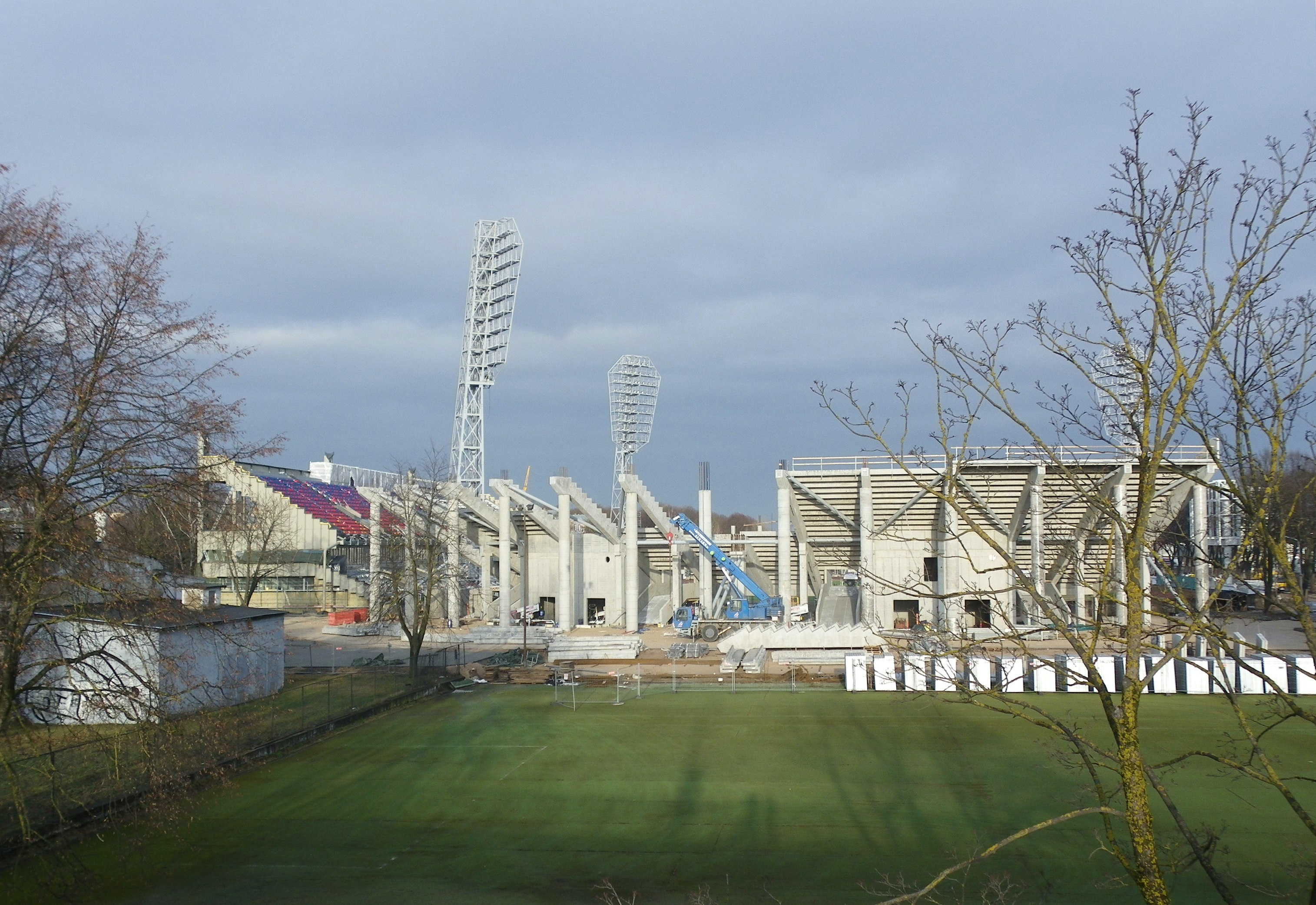
Stadium renovation works in 2018, the new side stands under construction

The project for the renovation of the stadium received funds from the European Regional Development Fund and the Latvian government in 2015 and the works officially started in September 2017, after a €62 million contract was signed on June 5 for the reconstruction of the stadium and the creation of the Grīziņkalns Sports and Culture District in its surroundings.

On 15 May 2018, the first phase of the renovation was completed, in the course of which new stands were built on both goal ends, increasing the capacity of the stadium from 5,683 seats to 10,461 seats, the main western stand with its indoor athletics facilities, conference rooms and VIP facilities were fully renovated and a new electronic scoreboard display was installed. After the renovation the stadium now meets UEFA Category 4 and IAAF Category 2 requirements. The second and final phase – during which the construction of a roof over the west terrace, a new ice rink replacing the one built in 1960 (demolished in 2018) and new, multi-functional sports halls is planned – is scheduled to be completed by 2022.

In April 2020 the construction of the new Daugava Ice Hall was started after the final construction permit was issued by the Riga City Council. The deadline for the unveiling of the venue is set for March 2021 in time for the 2021 IIHF World Championship. The final works were completed in early May.

Large-scale renovation projects were launched in 2022–2023. The new, €12.3 million Daugava Athletics Hall is due to be commissioned on December 31, although Latvijas Radio reported that interior works are behind schedule as of late September. The upcoming hall would host track and field athletes autumn to spring, and sports teams during the summer, e.g. volleyball, indoor football, handball and floorball, along with a possibility to host cultural events in the hall. A bobsleigh start ramp is under construction as well. In the stadium, the replacement of the football field turf and worn-out athletics track, as well as the installation of heating systems, is set to begin in late 2023.

Once complete, the complex is expected to include a football and athletics stadium, the Daugava Ice Hall, an athletic and sports game hall, an inflatable football practice hall, an athletic practice field and, additionally, a basketball and other sports game hall (the Team Sports Games Hall) on Krišjānis Barons Street in the neighborhood of Centrs, Riga.

The multi-functional Daugava Athletics Hall was put into commission in December 2023 and unveiled in early 2024. The latest renovation of the central stadium was completed in July 2024, which also permitted the stadium to receive its UEFA Category 4 status.
