= Croatia in the UEFA Nations League =

National team in European football league

The UEFA Nations League is a biennial international football competition contested by the senior men's national teams of the member associations of UEFA, the sport's European governing body. The Croatia national team contests this tournament in League A, with other major footballing nations. The team entered the Nations League's inaugural 2018–19 edition in League A. The nation's best result was contesting the 2023 UEFA Nations League Finals against Spain, securing second-place and their first tournament medal. Croatia made it to the quarter-finals of the 2024–25 UEFA Nations League, their second-best result.

== Overall record ==
UEFA Nations League record
Season	Division	Group	Pld	W	D	L	GF	GA	P/R	Rank
(Portugal) 2018–19	A	4	4	1	1	2	4	10	Same position	9th
(Italy) 2020–21	A	3	6	1	0	5	9	16	Same position	12th
(Netherlands) 2022–23	A	1	8	5	2	1	12	8	Same position	2nd
(Germany) 2024–25	A	1	8	3	2	3	10	10	Same position	8th
2026–27	A	3	In progress							
Total			26	10	5	11	35	44	Best: 2nd	

== 2018–19 League A ==
=== Group stage ===
Pos	Team	Pld	W	D	L	GF	GA	GD	Pts	Qualification (Note: Due to revamp of the format for the 2020–21 UEFA Nations League, no teams were eventually relegated.)	(England)	(Spain)	(Croatia)
1	England	4	2	1	1	6	5	+1	7	Qualification for Nations League Finals	—	1–2	2–1
2	Spain	4	2	0	2	12	7	+5	6		2–3	—	6–0
3	Croatia	4	1	1	2	4	10	−6	4		0–0	3–2	—

Source: UEFA
Rules for classification: Tiebreakers
Notes:
11 September 2018
20:45

Spain	6–0	Croatia
Saúl 24'; Asensio 33'; Kalinić 35' (o.g.); Rodrigo 49'; Ramos 57'; Isco 70'	Report

Martínez Valero, Elche
Attendance: 26,900
Referee: Benoît Bastien (France)

12 October 2018
20:45

Croatia	0–0	England
	Report

Stadion Rujevica, Rijeka
Attendance: 0 (Note: The Croatia v England match was played behind closed doors due to a UEFA punishment against Croatia for racist fan behaviour in their UEFA Euro 2016 qualifying home match against Italy.)
Referee: Felix Brych (Germany)

15 November 2018
20:45

Croatia	3–2	Spain
Kramarić 54'; Jedvaj 69', 90+3'	Report	Ceballos 56'; Ramos 78' (pen.)

Stadion Maksimir, Zagreb
Attendance: 33,018
Referee: Aleksei Kulbakov (Belarus)

18 November 2018
15:00 (14:00 UTC+0)

England	2–1	Croatia
Lingard 78'; Kane 85'	Report	Kramarić 57'

Wembley Stadium, London
Attendance: 78,221
Referee: Anastasios Sidiropoulos (Greece)

== 2020–21 League A ==
=== Group stage ===
Pos	Team	Pld	W	D	L	GF	GA	GD	Pts	Qualification or relegation	(France)	(Portugal)	(Croatia)	(Sweden)
1	France	6	5	1	0	12	5	+7	16	Qualification for Nations League Finals	—	0–0	4–2	4–2
2	Portugal	6	4	1	1	12	4	+8	13		0–1	—	4–1	3–0
3	Croatia	6	1	0	5	9	16	−7	3 (Note: Tied on head-to-head results. Overall goal difference was used as the tiebreaker.)		1–2	2–3	—	2–1
4	Sweden (R)	6	1	0	5	5	13	−8	3	Relegation to League B	0–1	0–2	2–1	—

Source: UEFA
Rules for classification: Tiebreakers
(R) Relegated
Notes:
5 September 2020
20:45 (19:45 UTC+1)

Portugal	4–1	Croatia
Cancelo 41'; Jota 58'; Félix 70'; A. Silva 90+5'	Report	Petković 90+1'

Estádio do Dragão, Porto
Attendance: 0 (Note: Due to the COVID-19 pandemic in Europe, all matches scheduled for September 2020 were played behind closed doors.)
Referee: Davide Massa (Italy)

8 September 2020
20:45

France	4–2	Croatia
Griezmann 43'; Livaković 45+1' (o.g.); Upamecano 65'; Giroud 77' (pen.)	Report	Lovren 17'; Brekalo 55'

Stade de France, Saint-Denis
Attendance: 0
Referee: Ovidiu Hațegan (Romania)

11 October 2020
18:00

Croatia	2–1	Sweden
Vlašić 32'; Kramarić 84'	Report	Berg 66'

Stadion Maksimir, Zagreb
Attendance: 2,020
Referee: John Beaton (Scotland)

14 October 2020
20:45

Croatia	1–2	France
Vlašić 64'	Report	Griezmann 8'; Mbappé 79'

Stadion Maksimir, Zagreb
Attendance: 6,266
Referee: Björn Kuipers (Netherlands)

14 November 2020
20:45

Sweden	2–1	Croatia
Kulusevski 36'; Danielson 45+2'	Report	Danielson 82' (o.g.)

Friends Arena, Solna
Attendance: 0 (Note: Due to the COVID-19 pandemic in Europe, the match was played behind closed doors.)
Referee: Daniel Siebert (Germany)

17 November 2020
20:45

Croatia	2–3	Portugal
Kovačić 29', 65'	Report	Dias 52', 90'; Félix 60'

Stadion Poljud, Split
Attendance: 0
Referee: Michael Oliver (England)

== 2022–23 League A ==
=== Group stage ===
Pos	Team	Pld	W	D	L	GF	GA	GD	Pts	Qualification or relegation	(Croatia)	(Denmark)	(France)	(Austria)
1	Croatia	6	4	1	1	8	6	+2	13	Qualification for Nations League Finals	—	2–1	1–1	0–3
2	Denmark	6	4	0	2	9	5	+4	12		0–1	—	2–0	2–0
3	France	6	1	2	3	5	7	−2	5		0–1	1–2	—	2–0
4	Austria (R)	6	1	1	4	6	10	−4	4	Relegation to League B	1–3	1–2	1–1	—

Source: UEFA
Rules for classification: Tiebreakers
(R) Relegated
3 June 2022
20:45

Croatia	0–3	Austria
	Report	Arnautović 41'; Gregoritsch 54'; Sabitzer 57'

Gradski Vrt Stadium, Osijek
Attendance: 13,994
Referee: Chris Kavanagh (England)

6 June 2022
20:45

Croatia	1–1	France
Kramarić 83' (pen.)	Report	Rabiot 52'

Stadion Poljud, Split
Attendance: 30,000
Referee: Marco Guida (Italy)

10 June 2022
20:45

Denmark	0–1	Croatia
	Report	Pašalić 69'

Parken Stadium, Copenhagen
Attendance: 35,862
Referee: Bartosz Frankowski (Poland)

13 June 2022
20:45

France	0–1	Croatia
	Report	Modrić 5' (pen.)

Stade de France, Saint-Denis
Attendance: 77,410
Referee: Orel Grinfeld (Israel)

22 September 2022
20:45

Croatia	2–1	Denmark
Sosa 49'; Majer 79'	Report	Eriksen 77'

Stadion Maksimir, Zagreb
Attendance: 22,715
Referee: Davide Massa (Italy)

25 September 2022
20:45

Austria	1–3	Croatia
Baumgartner 9'	Report	Modrić 6'; Livaja 69'; Lovren 72'

Ernst-Happel-Stadion, Vienna
Attendance: 45,700
Referee: Artur Soares Dias (Portugal)

=== Finals ===
Semi-finals

14 June 2023
20:45

Netherlands	2–4 (a.e.t.)	Croatia
Malen 34'; Lang 90+6'	Report	Kramarić 55' (pen.); Pašalić 72'; Petković 98'; Modrić 116' (pen.)

De Kuip, Rotterdam
Attendance: 39,359
Referee: István Kovács (Romania)

Final

18 June 2023
20:45

Croatia	0–0 (a.e.t.)	Spain
	Report
Penalties
Vlašić (penalty scored); Brozović (penalty scored); Modrić (penalty scored); Majer (penalty missed); Perišić (penalty scored); Petković (penalty missed)	4–5	(penalty scored) Joselu; (penalty scored) Rodri; (penalty scored) Merino; (penalty scored) Asensio; (penalty missed) Laporte; (penalty scored) Carvajal

De Kuip, Rotterdam
Attendance: 41,110
Referee: Felix Zwayer (Germany)

== 2024–25 League A ==
=== Group stage ===
Pos	Team	Pld	W	D	L	GF	GA	GD	Pts	Qualification or relegation	(Portugal)	(Croatia)	(Scotland)	(Poland)
1	Portugal	6	4	2	0	13	5	+8	14	Advance to quarter-finals	—	2–1	2–1	5–1
2	Croatia	6	2	2	2	8	8	0	8	Advance to quarter-finals	1–1	—	2–1	1–0
3	Scotland (R)	6	2	1	3	7	8	−1	7	Qualification for relegation play-offs	0–0	1–0	—	2–3
4	Poland (R)	6	1	1	4	9	16	−7	4	Relegation to League B	1–3	3–3	1–2	—

Source: UEFA
Rules for classification: Tiebreakers
(R) Relegated
5 September 2024
20:45 (19:45 UTC+1)

Portugal	2–1	Croatia
Dalot 7'; Ronaldo 34'	Report	Dalot 41' (o.g.)

Estádio da Luz, Lisbon
Attendance: 57,675
Referee: Halil Umut Meler (Turkey)

8 September 2024
20:45

Croatia	1–0	Poland
Modrić 52'	Report

Opus Arena, Osijek
Attendance: 12,612
Referee: François Letexier (France)

12 October 2024
18:00

Croatia	2–1	Scotland
Matanović 36'; Kramarić 70'	Report	Christie 33'

Stadion Maksimir, Zagreb
Attendance: 21,702
Referee: István Kovács (Romania)

15 October 2024
20:45

Poland	3–3	Croatia
Zieliński 5'; Zalewski 45'; S. Szymański 68'	Report	Sosa 19'; P. Sučić 24'; Baturina 26'

Stadion Narodowy, Warsaw
Attendance: 56,103
Referee: Alejandro Hernández Hernández (Spain)

15 November 2024
20:45 (19:45 UTC+0)

Scotland	1–0	Croatia
McGinn 86'	Report

Hampden Park, Glasgow
Attendance: 48,810
Referee: Orel Grinfeeld (Israel)

18 November 2024
20:45

Croatia	1–1	Portugal
Gvardiol 65'	Report	Félix 33'

Stadion Poljud, Split
Attendance: 33,386
Referee: Davide Massa (Italy)

=== Quarter-finals ===
First leg

20 March 2025
20:45

Croatia	2–0	France
Budimir 26'; Perišić 45+1'	Report

Stadion Poljud, Split
Attendance: 30,551
Referee: Espen Eskås (Norway)

Second leg

23 March 2025
20:45

France	2–0 (a.e.t.)	Croatia
Olise 52'; Dembélé 80'	Report
Penalties
Mbappé (penalty scored); Tchouaméni (penalty scored); Koundé (penalty missed); Kolo Muani (penalty scored); Hernandez (penalty missed); Doué (penalty scored); Upamecano (penalty scored)	5–4	(penalty missed) Baturina; (penalty scored) Moro; (penalty missed) Ivanović; (penalty scored) Pašalić; (penalty scored) Jakić; (penalty scored) Ćaleta-Car; (penalty missed) Stanišić

Stade de France, Saint-Denis
Attendance: 77,502
Referee: Michael Oliver (England)

2–2 on aggregate; France won 5–4 on penalties.

== 2026–27 League A ==
=== Group stage ===
Pos	Team	Pld	W	D	L	GF	GA	GD	Pts	Qualification or relegation	(Spain)	(England)	(Croatia)	(Czech Republic)
1	Spain (Q)	5	5	0	0	14	5	+9	15	Advance to quarter-finals	—	15 Nov	4–1	3–1
2	England (Q)	5	4	0	1	16	4	+12	12	Advance to quarter-finals	2–3	—	2–1	3–0
3	Croatia (Y)	5	1	0	4	5	16	−11	3	Possible qualification for relegation play-offs	1–2	0–7	—	15 Nov
4	Czech Republic (Y)	5	0	0	5	2	12	−10	0	Qualification for relegation play-offs or relegation to League B	0–2	0–2	1–2	—

Updated to match(es) played on 12 November 2026. Source: UEFA
Rules for classification: Tiebreakers
(Q) Qualified for the phase indicated; (Y) Cannot advance to quarter-finals
26 September 2026
20:45

Czech Republic	1–2	Croatia
Karabec 54'	Report	Modrić 47'; Marc. Pašalić 77'

Fortuna Arena, Prague
Attendance: 15,421
Referee: Simone Sozza (Italy)

29 September 2026
20:45

Spain	4–1	Croatia
Yamal 2', 63'; Pubill 31'; Williams 89'	Report	Beljo 28'

Ramón Sánchez-Pizjuán, Seville
Attendance: 40,294
Referee: Serdar Gözübüyük (Netherlands)

3 October 2026
18:00

Croatia	0–7	England
	Report	Kane 8', 53'; Bellingham 21'; Gordon 39'; Saka 45', 68'; Rogers 87'

Stadion HNK Rijeka, Rijeka
Attendance: 6,342
Referee: Sven Jablonski (Germany)

6 October 2026
20:45

Croatia	1–2	Spain
Perišić 17'	Report	Merino 61', 88'

Stadion Poljud, Split
Attendance: 32,690
Referee: Erik Lambrechts (Belgium)

12 November 2026
20:45 (19:45 UTC+0)

England	2–1	Croatia
Rogers 24'; Kane 64' (pen.)	Report	P. Sučić 59'

Wembley Stadium, London
Attendance: 80,484
Referee: Morten Krogh (Denmark)

15 November 2026
20:45

Croatia	v	Czech Republic
	Report

Opus Arena, Osijek

== List of matches ==
Edition	Round	Opponent	Score	Result	Venue	Croatia scorers
2018–19	Group stage	Spain	0–6	L	Elche	—
2018–19	Group stage	England	0–0	D	Rijeka	—
2018–19	Group stage	Spain	3–2	W	Zagreb	Kramarić, Jedvaj (2)
2018–19	Group stage	England	1–2	L	London	Kramarić
2020–21	Group stage	Portugal	1–4	L	Porto	Petković
2020–21	Group stage	France	2–4	L	Saint-Denis	Lovren, Brekalo
2020–21	Group stage	Sweden	2–1	W	Zagreb	Vlašić, Kramarić
2020–21	Group stage	France	1–2	L	Zagreb	Vlašić
2020–21	Group stage	Sweden	1–2	L	Solna	Danielson (o.g.)
2020–21	Group stage	Portugal	2–3	L	Split	Kovačić (2)
2022–23	Group stage	Austria	0–3	L	Osijek	—
2022–23	Group stage	France	1–1	D	Split	Kramarić
2022–23	Group stage	Denmark	1–0	W	Copenhagen	Mari. Pašalić
2022–23	Group stage	France	1–0	W	Saint-Denis	Modrić
2022–23	Group stage	Denmark	2–1	W	Zagreb	Sosa, Majer
2022–23	Group stage	Austria	3–1	W	Vienna	Modrić, Livaja, Lovren
2022–23	Semi-finals	Netherlands	4–2 (a.e.t.)	W	Rotterdam	Kramarić, Mari. Pašalić, Petković, Modrić
2022–23	Final	Spain	0–0 (a.e.t.) (4–5 p)	D	Rotterdam	—
2024–25	Group stage	Portugal	1–2	L	Lisbon	Dalot (o.g.)
2024–25	Group stage	Poland	1–0	W	Osijek	Modrić
2024–25	Group stage	Scotland	2–1	W	Zagreb	Matanović, Kramarić
2024–25	Group stage	Poland	3–3	D	Warsaw	Sosa, P. Sučić, Baturina
2024–25	Group stage	Scotland	0–1	L	Glasgow	—
2024–25	Group stage	Portugal	1–1	D	Split	Gvardiol
2024–25	Quarter-finals	France	2–0	W	Split	Budimir, Perišić
2024–25	Quarter-finals	France	0–2 (a.e.t.) (4–5 p)	L	Saint-Denis	—
2026–27	Group stage	Czech Republic	2–1	W	Prague	Modrić, Marc. Pašalić
2026–27	Group stage	Spain	1–4	L	Seville	Beljo
2026–27	Group stage	England	0–7	L	Rijeka	—
2026–27	Group stage	Spain	1–2	L	Split	Perišić
2026–27	Group stage	England	1–2	L	London	P. Sučić
2026–27	Group stage	Czech Republic			Osijek	

== Player records ==
=== Most appearances ===
Rank	Player	Matches
1	Luka Modrić	29
2	Mateo Kovačić	27
2	Mario Pašalić	27
4	Ivan Perišić	26
5	Dominik Livaković	25

=== Top goalscorers ===
Rank	Player	Goals
1	Andrej Kramarić	6
2	Luka Modrić	5
3	Tin Jedvaj	2
3	Mateo Kovačić	2
3	Dejan Lovren	2
3	Mario Pašalić	2
3	Ivan Perišić	2
3	Bruno Petković	2
3	Borna Sosa	2
3	Petar Sučić	2
3	Nikola Vlašić	2

== See also ==
- Croatia at the FIFA World Cup
- Croatia at the UEFA European Championship
