= 2027 UEFA Nations League Finals =

Tournament details
- Host country: TBD
- Dates: 9–13 June
- Teams: 4
- Venues: 2 (in 1 or 2 host cities)

The 2027 UEFA Nations League Finals will be the final tournament of the 2026–27 edition of the UEFA Nations League, the fifth season of the international football competition involving the men's national teams of the member associations of UEFA. The tournament will be held from 9 to 13 June 2027, and will be contested by the four quarter-final winners from Nations League A. The tournament will consist of two semi-finals, a third place play-off and final to determine the champions of the UEFA Nations League.

Portugal are the defending champions, having won the 2025 finals.

== Format ==
The Nations League Finals will take place in June 2027 and will be contested by the four winners of the League A quarter-finals.

The Nations League Finals will take place over five days and be played in single-leg knockout matches, consisting of two semi-finals on 9 and 10 June (the first of which features the host team, if participating), and a third place play-off and final three days after the second semi-final on 13 June 2027. The semi-final pairings will be determined by means of an open draw. All matches in the tournament will utilise the goal-line technology and video assistant referee (VAR) systems.

In the Nations League Finals, if the scores are level at the end of normal time:

- In the semi-finals and final, 30 minutes of extra time will be played. If the score is still level after extra time, the winner will be determined by a penalty shoot-out.
- In the third place play-off, extra time will not be played, and the winner will be determined by a penalty shoot-out.

== Qualified teams ==
The four winners of the League A quarter-finals will qualify for the Nations League Finals.

Quarter-final winners	Date of qualification	Previous finals appearances	UNL Rankings November 2026	FIFA Rankings April 2027
Spain or France	28 March 2027			
Belgium or Germany	28 March 2027			
Norway or England	30 March 2027			
Netherlands or Portugal	30 March 2027			

== Host selection ==
Due to the quarter-finals taking place in March 2027, the participants of the Nations League Finals will not be known until just over two months prior to the tournament. As a result, all associations participating in League A with venues meeting the stadium requirements must submit a proposal to host the Nations League Finals. Following the league phase, the UEFA Executive Committee will designate one pair of quarter-finalists capable of holding the tournament, with the winner automatically becoming the host. Additionally, associations from outside League A may also submit a bid to hold the tournament as a neutral host, with their bids to be considered only if no pairing of quarter-finalists can offer sufficient guarantees or satisfy the hosting requirements.

UEFA requires the tournament to be played at two Category 4 stadiums, each with at least 30,000 net seating capacity (though there may be some flexibility regarding the second stadium). Ideally, the stadiums should not be located more than 150 kilometres (93 mi), or a two-hour bus drive, apart. If hosted by a participating team, the larger of the stadiums should hold the first semi-final (featuring the host team) and the final. The bidding timeline is as follows:

- 5 February 2026: Applications formally invited
- 31 August 2026, 16:00 CEST: Closing date for registering intention to bid and preferred stadiums
- 2 September 2026: Bid requirements made available to bidders
- 21 October 2026: Submission of bid documents
- 6 December 2026: Host appointment by the UEFA Executive Committee
- March 2027: Legal documentation and budget finalised

== Draw ==
The semi-final pairings will be determined by means of an open draw following the league phase. As the winners of the quarter-finals will not be known at the time of the draw, they will be represented by placeholders for the winners of quarter-finals 1 to 4. For scheduling purposes, the host team (once appointed) will be allocated to semi-final 1 as the administrative home team. The administrative home team for both the third place play-off and final were predetermined as the teams which advanced from semi-final 1.

== Squads ==
Each national team has to submit a squad of 26 players, three of whom have to be goalkeepers, at least seven days before the opening match of the tournament. If an outfielder becomes injured or ill severely enough to prevent his participation in the tournament before his team's first match, he may be replaced by another player. Goalkeepers with an injury or illness may be replaced before or during the tournament.

== Bracket ==
Semi-finals
9–10 June – TBD
Netherlands or Portugal
Spain or France
9–10 June – TBD
Belgium or Germany
Norway or England

Final
13 June – TBD
Winner semi-final A
Winner semi-final B
Third place play-off
13 June – TBD
Loser Match 1
Loser Match 2

All times are CEST (UTC+2).

== Semi-finals ==
The match containing the host team will become semi-final 1, played on 9 June, while the other match will become semi-final 2, played on 10 June 2027.

=== Semi-final A ===
9–10 June 2027
21:00

Netherlands or Portugal	Semi-final A	Spain or France

=== Semi-final B ===
9–10 June 2027
21:00

Belgium or Germany	Semi-final B	Norway or England

== Third place play-off ==
13 June 2027
15:00

Loser Match 1	Match 3	Loser Match 2

== Final ==
13 June 2027
21:00

Winner Match 1	Match 4	Winner Match 2

== Statistics ==
=== Discipline ===
A player or coach will be automatically suspended for the next match for receiving a red card, which can be extended for serious offences. Yellow card suspensions will not apply in the Nations League Finals, including any pending suspensions from the league phase and quarter-finals, while yellow cards issued will not be carried forward to any other future international matches.
