= 2026–27 UEFA Nations League B =

Tournament details
- Dates: 24 September – 17 November 2026
- Teams: 16
- Promoted: Austria; Northern Ireland; Sweden; Switzerland

Tournament statistics
- Matches played: 48
- Goals scored: 106 (2.21 per match)
- Attendance: 1,118,122 (23,294 per match)
- Top scorer(s): (Sweden) Viktor Gyökeres (Republic of Ireland) Troy Parrott (6 goals each)

The 2026–27 UEFA Nations League B was the second division of the 2026–27 edition of the UEFA Nations League, the fifth season of the international football competition involving the men's national teams of the member associations of UEFA.

== Format ==
League B consisted of 16 UEFA members ranked from 17–32 in the 2024–25 UEFA Nations League final overall ranking, split into four groups of four. Each team played six matches within their group, using the home-and-away round-robin format on matchdays in September, October and November 2026. The winners of each group were promoted to the 2028–29 UEFA Nations League A. In addition, the second-placed teams from each group advanced to the promotion play-offs against a third or fourth-placed team from League A, while the League B fourth-placed teams will participate in relegation play-offs against the second-placed teams from League C, both taking place in March 2027. In the play-offs, teams from the higher leagues will host the second leg, with the winners of each tie participating in the higher league for the next Nations League season, while the losers will enter the lower league.

Originally, the format for promotion and relegation would have involved only the last-placed teams in Leagues A and B being relegated. The promotion/relegation play-offs would have concerned all third-placed teams in Leagues A and B and all runners-up in Leagues B and C, with extra play-offs concerning the two best last-places in League C to be held in March 2028. However, due to the changes scheduled for the 2028–29 UEFA Nations League, in which the competition will be reduced from four leagues to three leagues of 18 teams, promotion/relegation was rebalanced to make all three upcoming leagues be at 18 teams.

== Teams ==
League B included sixteen teams based on the results of the 2024–25 season: the four group fourth-placed teams from League A, the four losers of the League A/B play-offs, the four group winners from League C and the four winners of the League B/C play-offs.

=== Team changes ===
The following were the team changes in League B from the 2024–25 season:

Incoming
Relegated from Nations League A	Promoted from Nations League C
Bosnia and Herzegovina; Hungary; Israel; Poland; Scotland; Switzerland	Kosovo; North Macedonia; Northern Ireland; Romania; Sweden

Outgoing
Promoted to Nations League A	Relegated to Nations League C
Czech Republic; England; Greece; Norway; Turkey; Wales	Albania; Finland; Iceland; Kazakhstan; Montenegro

=== Seeding ===
The teams were seeded for the league phase based on the 2024–25 Nations League final overall ranking, considering promotion and relegation between the leagues.

Pot 1
Team	Rank
Scotland	17
Hungary	18
Poland	19
Israel	20

Pot 2
Team	Rank
Switzerland	21
Bosnia and Herzegovina	22
Austria	23
Ukraine	24

Pot 3
Team	Rank
Slovenia	25
Georgia	26
Republic of Ireland	27
Romania	28

Pot 4
Team	Rank
Sweden	29
North Macedonia	30
Northern Ireland	31
Kosovo	32

The draw for the league phase took place in Brussels, Belgium, on 12 February 2026, 18:00 CET. Groups were drawn to contain one team from each pot. For political reasons, Bosnia and Herzegovina vs Kosovo was considered a prohibited clash, and thus those teams were unable to be drawn into the same group.

== Groups ==
The fixture list was confirmed by UEFA on 13 February 2026, the day following the draw.

Times are CET/CEST, (Note: CEST (UTC+2) for matchdays 1–4 (September and October 2026), CET (UTC+1) for matchdays 5–6 (November 2026).) as listed by UEFA (local times, if different, are in parentheses).

=== Group 1 ===
Pos	Team	Pld	W	D	L	GF	GA	GD	Pts	Promotion or qualification	(Switzerland)	(Slovenia)	(Scotland)	(North Macedonia)
1	Switzerland (P)	6	5	1	0	15	1	+14	16	Promotion to League A	—	2–1	4–0	3–0
2	Slovenia	6	3	2	1	8	3	+5	11	Qualification for promotion play-offs	0–0	—	0–0	2–0
3	Scotland	6	2	1	3	5	10	−5	7		0–3	1–2	—	2–1
4	North Macedonia	6	0	0	6	1	15	−14	0	Qualification for relegation play-offs	0–3	0–3	0–2	—

Source: UEFA
Rules for classification: Tiebreakers
(P) Promoted
26 September 2026
15:00

Slovenia	0–0	Scotland
	Report

Stožice Stadium, Ljubljana
Attendance: 12,182
Referee: Horațiu Feșnic (Romania)
26 September 2026
20:45

North Macedonia	0–3	Switzerland
	Report	Freuler 22'; Amdouni 41', 74'

Toše Proeski Arena, Skopje
Attendance: 11,474
Referee: Daniel Schlager (Germany)

29 September 2026
20:45 (19:45 UTC+1)

Scotland	0–3	Switzerland
	Report	Rodriguez 12'; Elvedi 55'; Amdouni 82'

Hampden Park, Glasgow
Attendance: 41,028
Referee: Nenad Minaković (Serbia)
29 September 2026
20:45

Slovenia	2–0	North Macedonia
Lovrić 55'; Matko 82'	Report

Stožice Stadium, Ljubljana
Attendance: 10,246
Referee: Andrea Colombo (Italy)

3 October 2026
20:45

North Macedonia	0–2	Scotland
	Report	Bowie 7'; McGinn 70' (pen.)

Toše Proeski Arena, Skopje
Attendance: 8,256
Referee: François Letexier (France)
3 October 2026
20:45

Switzerland	2–1	Slovenia
Janža 10' (o.g.); Ndoye 38'	Report	Vipotnik 2'

Thermoplan Arena, Lucerne
Attendance: 15,240
Referee: Ivan Kružliak (Slovakia)

6 October 2026
20:45 (19:45 UTC+1)

Scotland	1–2	Slovenia
Christie 31'	Report	Matko 56'; Šturm 71'

Hampden Park, Glasgow
Attendance: 34,466
Referee: José María Sánchez Martínez (Spain)
6 October 2026
20:45

Switzerland	3–0	North Macedonia
Rieder 43'; Manzambi 73'; Ndoye 81'	Report

Thermoplan Arena, Lucerne
Attendance: 15,730
Referee: Edgars Maļcevs (Latvia)

13 November 2026
20:45 (19:45 UTC+0)

Scotland	2–1	North Macedonia
McGinn 54', 74' (pen.)	Report	Rastoder 57'

Hampden Park, Glasgow
Attendance: 41,585
Referee: Michal Očenáš (Slovakia)
13 November 2026
20:45

Slovenia	0–0	Switzerland
	Report

Ljudski vrt, Maribor
Attendance: 10,500
Referee: Jasper Vergoote (Belgium)

16 November 2026
20:45

North Macedonia	0–3	Slovenia
	Report	Šturm 29', 90+1'; Zec 66'

Toše Proeski Arena, Skopje
Attendance: 1,875
Referee: Serdar Gözübüyük (Netherlands)
16 November 2026
20:45

Switzerland	4–0	Scotland
Ferguson 22' (o.g.); Boteli 47'; Sanches 51'; Amdouni 89'	Report

Sitterstadion, St. Gallen
Attendance: 17,742
Referee: Danny Makkelie (Netherlands)

=== Group 2 ===
Pos	Team	Pld	W	D	L	GF	GA	GD	Pts	Promotion or qualification	(Northern Ireland)	(Hungary)	(Ukraine)	(Georgia (country))
1	Northern Ireland (P)	6	3	3	0	6	1	+5	12	Promotion to League A	—	0–0	1–0	0–0
2	Hungary	6	3	2	1	6	3	+3	11	Qualification for promotion play-offs	1–1	—	0–1	1–0
3	Ukraine	6	2	1	3	3	6	−3	7		0–3	1–2	—	1–0
4	Georgia	6	0	2	4	0	5	−5	2	Qualification for relegation play-offs	0–1	0–2	0–0	—

Source: UEFA
Rules for classification: Tiebreakers
(P) Promoted
25 September 2026
18:00 (20:00 UTC+4)

Georgia	0–1	Northern Ireland
	Report	S. Charles 90+9'

Boris Paichadze Dinamo Arena, Tbilisi
Attendance: 7,470
Referee: Orel Grinfeld (Israel)
25 September 2026
20:45

Hungary	0–1	Ukraine
	Report	Sikan 42'

Puskás Aréna, Budapest
Attendance: 56,796
Referee: Jarred Gillett (England)

28 September 2026
18:00 (20:00 UTC+4)

Georgia	0–0	Ukraine
	Report

Boris Paichadze Dinamo Arena, Tbilisi
Attendance: 43,382
Referee: Aliyar Aghayev (Azerbaijan)
28 September 2026
20:45 (19:45 UTC+1)

Northern Ireland	0–0	Hungary
	Report

Windsor Park, Belfast
Attendance: 18,082
Referee: Ricardo de Burgos Bengoetxea (Spain)

2 October 2026
20:45

Hungary	1–0	Georgia
Kerkez 35'	Report

Puskás Aréna, Budapest
Attendance: 52,870
Referee: Srđan Jovanović (Serbia)
2 October 2026
20:45

Ukraine	0–3	Northern Ireland
	Report	Brown 9', 61'; Price 22'

Anton Malatinský Stadium, Trnava (Slovakia) (Note: Due to the Russian invasion of Ukraine, Ukraine are required to play their home matches at neutral venues until further notice.)
Attendance: 7,080
Referee: Jasper Vergoote (Belgium)

5 October 2026
20:45 (19:45 UTC+1)

Northern Ireland	0–0	Georgia
	Report

Windsor Park, Belfast
Attendance: 18,140
Referee: Sebastian Gishamer (Austria)
5 October 2026
20:45

Ukraine	1–2	Hungary
Yaremchuk 83'	Report	M. Tóth 52'; Csinger 85'

Anton Malatinský Stadium, Trnava (Slovakia)
Attendance: 7,910
Referee: Igor Pajač (Croatia)

14 November 2026
18:00 (21:00 UTC+4)

Georgia	0–2	Hungary
	Report	Dvali 73' (o.g.); Varga 85'

Mikheil Meskhi Stadium, Tbilisi
Attendance: 19,187
Referee: Ondřej Berka (Czech Republic)
14 November 2026
20:45 (19:45 UTC+0)

Northern Ireland	1–0	Ukraine
Devlin 68'	Report

Windsor Park, Belfast
Attendance: 18,225
Referee: François Letexier (France)

17 November 2026
20:45

Hungary	1–1	Northern Ireland
Varga 35'	Report	Devenny 65'

Puskás Aréna, Budapest
Attendance: 55,276
Referee: Marco Guida (Italy)
17 November 2026
20:45

Ukraine	1–0	Georgia
Sikan 1'	Report

Košická futbalová aréna, Košice (Slovakia)
Attendance: 5,400
Referee: Martin Matoša (Slovenia)

=== Group 3 ===
Pos	Team	Pld	W	D	L	GF	GA	GD	Pts	Promotion or qualification	(Austria)	(Republic of Ireland)	(Kosovo)	(Israel)
1	Austria (P)	6	3	3	0	11	6	+5	12	Promotion to League A	—	1–0	3–1	3–1
2	Republic of Ireland	6	2	2	2	9	5	+4	8	Qualification for promotion play-offs	2–2	—	3–0	1–1
3	Kosovo	6	1	3	2	3	7	−4	6		1–1	1–0	—	0–0
4	Israel	6	0	4	2	3	8	−5	4	Qualification for relegation play-offs	1–1	0–3	0–0	—

Source: UEFA
Rules for classification: Tiebreakers
(P) Promoted
24 September 2026
20:45

Austria	3–1	Israel
Schmid 43' (pen.); Mwene 90'; Kalajdžić 90+3'	Report	Abu Farchi 55'

Raiffeisen Arena, Linz
Attendance: 15,200
Referee: Georgi Kabakov (Bulgaria)
24 September 2026
20:45

Kosovo	1–0	Republic of Ireland
Muriqi 83'	Report

Fadil Vokrri Stadium, Pristina
Attendance: 12,627
Referee: Lawrence Visser (Belgium)

27 September 2026
18:00

Austria	3–1	Kosovo
Affengruber 23'; Adamu 45+2'; Chukwuemeka 61'	Report	Zhegrova 83' (pen.)

Ernst-Happel-Stadion, Vienna
Attendance: 47,000
Referee: Nick Walsh (Scotland)
27 September 2026
20:45

Israel	0–3	Republic of Ireland
	Report	Parrott 13'; Idah 16'; Moylan 25'

Nagyerdei Stadion, Debrecen (Hungary) (Note: Due to the Middle Eastern crisis, Israel are required to play their home matches at neutral venues.)
Attendance: 319
Referee: Harm Osmers (Germany)

1 October 2026
20:45

Israel	0–0	Kosovo
	Report

Nagyerdei Stadion, Debrecen (Hungary)
Attendance: 440
Referee: Radu Petrescu (Romania)
1 October 2026
20:45 (19:45 UTC+1)

Republic of Ireland	2–2	Austria
Parrott 12', 45' (pen.)	Report	Prass 71'; Gregoritsch 77'

Aviva Stadium, Dublin
Attendance: 45,784
Referee: Allard Lindhout (Netherlands)

4 October 2026
18:00

Kosovo	1–1	Austria
Asllani 70'	Report	Lang 85'

Fadil Vokrri Stadium, Pristina
Attendance: 12,567
Referee: António Nobre (Portugal)
4 October 2026
20:45

Republic of Ireland	1–1	Israel
Parrott 39' (pen.)	Report	D. Peretz 47'

TSC Arena, Bačka Topola (Serbia) (Note: Following a request from the Football Association of Ireland, the Republic of Ireland v Israel match was played at a neutral venue and behind closed doors due to safety concerns.)
Attendance: 0
Referee: Juan Martínez Munuera (Spain)

14 November 2026
15:00

Kosovo	0–0	Israel
	Report

Fadil Vokrri Stadium, Pristina
Attendance: 12,426
Referee: Ivan Kružliak (Slovakia)
14 November 2026
20:45

Austria	1–0	Republic of Ireland
Kalajdžić 79'	Report

Raiffeisen Arena, Linz
Attendance: 16,700
Referee: Irfan Peljto (Bosnia and Herzegovina)

17 November 2026
20:45

Israel	1–1	Austria
Do. Peretz 36'	Report	Kalajdžić 62'

Nagyerdei Stadion, Debrecen (Hungary)
Attendance: 510
Referee: Davide Massa (Italy)
17 November 2026
20:45 (19:45 UTC+0)

Republic of Ireland	3–0	Kosovo
Parrott 28' (pen.), 50' (pen.); Moylan 75'	Report

Aviva Stadium, Dublin
Attendance: 50,381
Referee: Edgars Maļcevs (Latvia)

=== Group 4 ===
Pos	Team	Pld	W	D	L	GF	GA	GD	Pts	Promotion or qualification	(Sweden)	(Bosnia and Herzegovina)	(Poland)	(Romania)
1	Sweden (P)	6	4	2	0	11	6	+5	14	Promotion to League A	—	3–2	3–1	2–1
2	Bosnia and Herzegovina	6	3	2	1	10	7	+3	11	Qualification for promotion play-offs	1–1	—	1–0	2–1
3	Poland	6	1	2	3	9	7	+2	5		1–1	0–0	—	6–0
4	Romania	6	1	0	5	6	16	−10	3	Qualification for relegation play-offs	0–1	2–4	2–1	—

Source: UEFA
Rules for classification: Tiebreakers
(P) Promoted
25 September 2026
20:45

Poland	0–0	Bosnia and Herzegovina
	Report

Stadion Narodowy, Warsaw
Attendance: 46,775
Referee: Anastasios Papapetrou (Greece)
25 September 2026
20:45

Sweden	2–1	Romania
Isak 20'; Gyökeres 43'	Report	Man 29'

Nationalarenan, Solna
Attendance: 31,882
Referee: Ondřej Berka (Czech Republic)

28 September 2026
20:45 (21:45 UTC+3)

Romania	2–4	Bosnia and Herzegovina
Bîrligea 28'; Cicâldău 62'	Report	Gigović 12'; Muharemović 19'; Tabaković 40'; Mahmić 55'

Arena Națională, Bucharest
Attendance: 0 (Note: The Romania v Bosnia and Herzegovina match was played behind closed doors due to punishment from UEFA following fan misconduct.)
Referee: Luis Godinho (Portugal)
28 September 2026
20:45

Sweden	3–1	Poland
Nygren 8'; Ayari 64'; Gyökeres 72'	Report	Szymański 43'

Nationalarenan, Solna
Attendance: 24,637
Referee: Javier Alberola Rojas (Spain)

2 October 2026
20:45

Bosnia and Herzegovina	1–1	Sweden
Alajbegović 80'	Report	Gyökeres 61'

Bilino Polje Stadium, Zenica
Attendance: 11,700
Referee: Oleksii Derevinskyi (Ukraine)
2 October 2026
20:45

Poland	6–0	Romania
Lewandowski 24' (pen.), 47', 86'; Ghiță 49' (o.g.); Zieliński 62'; Bednarek 66'	Report

Stadion Narodowy, Warsaw
Attendance: 51,054
Referee: Urs Schnyder (Switzerland)

5 October 2026
20:45

Bosnia and Herzegovina	1–0	Poland
Bašić 84' (pen.)	Report

Bilino Polje Stadium, Zenica
Attendance: 11,700
Referee: Jérémie Pignard (France)
5 October 2026
20:45 (21:45 UTC+3)

Romania	0–1	Sweden
	Report	Gyökeres 13'

Arena Națională, Bucharest
Attendance: 49,426
Referee: Elchin Masiyev (Azerbaijan)

14 November 2026
20:45 (21:45 UTC+2)

Romania	2–1	Poland
Cicâldău 68'; Man 72'	Report	Reguła 82'

Arena Națională, Bucharest
Attendance: 45,827
Referee: Sebastian Gishamer (Austria)
14 November 2026
20:45

Sweden	3–2	Bosnia and Herzegovina
Svensson 5'; Gyökeres 11' (pen.), 45+2' (pen.)	Report	Gigović 47'; Kolašinac 62'

Nationalarenan, Solna
Attendance: 51,049
Referee: Simone Sozza (Italy)

17 November 2026
20:45

Bosnia and Herzegovina	2–1	Romania
Tahirović 44'; Bajraktarević 82'	Report	Birgilea 6'

Bilino Polje Stadium, Zenica
Attendance: 11,460
Referee: José María Sánchez Martínez (Spain)
17 November 2026
20:45

Poland	1–1	Sweden
Benedyczak 16'	Report	Larsson 24'

Wrocław Stadium, Wrocław
Attendance: 38,516
Referee: Felix Zwayer (Germany)

== Goalscorers ==
There were 106 goals scored in 48 matches, for an average of 2.21 goals per match.

6 goals

- (Republic of Ireland national football team) Troy Parrott
- (Sweden men's national football team) Viktor Gyökeres

4 goals

- (Switzerland national football team) Zeki Amdouni

3 goals

- (Austria national football team) Saša Kalajdžić
- (Poland national football team) Robert Lewandowski
- (Scotland national football team) John McGinn
- (Slovenia national football team) Danijel Šturm

2 goals

- (Bosnia and Herzegovina national football team) Armin Gigović
- (Hungary national football team) Barnabás Varga
- (Israel national football team) Dor Peretz
- (Northern Ireland national football team) Ciaron Brown
- (Republic of Ireland national football team) Jack Moylan
- (Romania national football team) Daniel Bîrligea
- (Romania national football team) Alexandru Cicâldău
- (Romania national football team) Dennis Man
- (Slovenia national football team) Aljoša Matko
- (Switzerland national football team) Dan Ndoye
- (Ukraine national football team) Danylo Sikan

1 goal

- (Austria national football team) Junior Adamu
- (Austria national football team) David Affengruber
- (Austria national football team) Carney Chukwuemeka
- (Austria national football team) Michael Gregoritsch
- (Austria national football team) Christoph Lang
- (Austria national football team) Phillipp Mwene
- (Austria national football team) Alexander Prass
- (Austria national football team) Romano Schmid
- (Bosnia and Herzegovina national football team) Kerim Alajbegović
- (Bosnia and Herzegovina national football team) Esmir Bajraktarević
- (Bosnia and Herzegovina national football team) Ivan Bašić
- (Bosnia and Herzegovina national football team) Sead Kolašinac
- (Bosnia and Herzegovina national football team) Ermin Mahmić
- (Bosnia and Herzegovina national football team) Tarik Muharemović
- (Bosnia and Herzegovina national football team) Haris Tabaković
- (Bosnia and Herzegovina national football team) Benjamin Tahirović
- (Hungary national football team) Márk Csinger
- (Hungary national football team) Milos Kerkez
- (Hungary national football team) Milán Tóth
- (Israel national football team) Sayed Abu Farchi
- (Kosovo national football team) Fisnik Asllani
- (Kosovo national football team) Vedat Muriqi
- (Kosovo national football team) Edon Zhegrova
- (North Macedonia national football team) Elmin Rastoder
- (Northern Ireland national football team) Shea Charles
- (Northern Ireland national football team) Justin Devenny
- (Northern Ireland national football team) Terry Devlin
- (Northern Ireland national football team) Isaac Price
- (Poland national football team) Jan Bednarek
- (Poland national football team) Adrian Benedyczak
- (Poland national football team) Marcel Reguła
- (Poland national football team) Sebastian Szymański
- (Poland national football team) Piotr Zieliński
- (Republic of Ireland national football team) Adam Idah
- (Scotland national football team) Kieron Bowie
- (Scotland national football team) Ryan Christie
- (Slovenia national football team) Sandi Lovrić
- (Slovenia national football team) Žan Vipotnik
- (Slovenia national football team) David Zec
- (Sweden men's national football team) Yasin Ayari
- (Sweden men's national football team) Alexander Isak
- (Sweden men's national football team) Larsson
- (Sweden men's national football team) Benjamin Nygren
- (Sweden men's national football team) Daniel Svensson
- (Switzerland national football team) Winsley Boteli
- (Switzerland national football team) Nico Elvedi
- (Switzerland national football team) Remo Freuler
- (Switzerland national football team) Johan Manzambi
- (Switzerland national football team) Fabian Rieder
- (Switzerland national football team) Ricardo Rodriguez
- (Switzerland national football team) Alvyn Sanches
- (Ukraine national football team) Roman Yaremchuk

1 own goal

- (Georgia national football team) Lasha Dvali (against Hungary)
- (Romania national football team) Virgil Ghiță (against Poland)
- (Scotland national football team) Lewis Ferguson (against Switzerland)
- (Slovenia national football team) Erik Janža (against Switzerland)

== Overall ranking ==
Following the league phase, the 16 League B teams were ordered 17th to 32nd in an interim overall ranking for the 2026–27 UEFA Nations League according to the following rules:

- The teams finishing first in the groups were ranked 17th to 20th according to the results of the league phase.
- The teams finishing second in the groups were ranked 21st to 24th according to the results of the league phase.
- The teams finishing third in the groups were ranked 25th to 28th according to the results of the league phase.
- The teams finishing fourth in the groups were ranked 29th to 32nd according to the results of the league phase.

Rnk	Grp	Team	Pld	W	D	L	GF	GA	GD	Pts
17	B1	Switzerland	6	5	1	0	15	1	+14	16
18	B4	Sweden	6	4	2	0	11	6	+5	14
19	B3	Austria	6	3	3	0	11	6	+5	12
20	B2	Northern Ireland	6	3	3	0	6	1	+5	12
21	B1	Slovenia	6	3	2	1	8	3	+5	11
22	B4	Bosnia and Herzegovina	6	3	2	1	10	7	+3	11
23	B2	Hungary	6	3	2	1	6	3	+3	11
24	B3	Republic of Ireland	6	2	2	2	9	5	+4	8
25	B2	Ukraine	6	2	1	3	3	6	−3	7
26	B1	Scotland	6	2	1	3	5	10	−5	7
27	B3	Kosovo	6	1	3	2	3	7	−4	6
28	B4	Poland	6	1	2	3	9	7	+2	5
29	B3	Israel	6	0	4	2	3	8	−5	4
30	B4	Romania	6	1	0	5	6	16	−10	3
31	B2	Georgia	6	0	2	4	0	5	−5	2
32	B1	North Macedonia	6	0	0	6	1	15	−14	0

Source: UEFA
Rules for classification: Ranking criteria

A final overall ranking will also be compiled, though this is only used to rank teams within their new leagues for the following edition of the competition.
