= 2026–27 UEFA Nations League A =

Tournament details
- Dates: League phase: 24 September – 17 November 2026; Quarter-finals: 25–30 March 2027; Nations League Finals: 9–13 June 2027
- Teams: 16
- Relegated: Czech Republic; Turkey

Tournament statistics
- Matches played: 48
- Goals scored: 161 (3.35 per match)
- Attendance: 1,806,128 (37,628 per match)
- Top scorer(s): (England) Harry Kane (8 goals)
- All statistics correct as of 17 November 2026.

The 2026–27 UEFA Nations League A is the top division of the 2026–27 edition of the UEFA Nations League, the fifth season of the international football competition involving the men's national teams of the member associations of UEFA. League A began with the league phase in September 2026, and will culminate with the Nations League Finals in June 2027 to determine the champions of the competition.

Portugal are the defending champions, having won the 2025 final.

== Format ==
League A consists of the 16 top-ranked UEFA members from the 2024–25 UEFA Nations League final overall ranking, split into four groups of four. Each team played six matches within their group, using the home-and-away round-robin format on matchdays in September, October and November 2026.

Following the league phase, the top two teams of each group advanced to the quarter-finals, played home-and-away over two legs in March 2027. In each tie, group winners will face a runner-up from a different group, with the group winner hosting the second leg. The four quarter-final winners will advance to the 2027 UEFA Nations League Finals. The two worst last-placed teams of each group were relegated directly to League B, while the two best last-placed teams and two worst third-placed teams will compete against the runners-up of League B to either retain their place in League A for the next season, or face relegation to 2028–29 UEFA Nations League B. The relegation play-offs will be played home-and-away over two legs in March 2027, with the League A teams hosting the second leg. In all two-legged ties, the team that scores more goals on aggregate is the winner. If the aggregate score is level, extra time will be played without the away goals rule. If the score remains level after extra time, a penalty shoot-out will be used to decide the winner.

Originally, the format for promotion and relegation would have involved all last-placed teams in League A being relegated. The promotion/relegation play-offs would have concerned all third-placed teams in League A and all runners-up in League B. However, due to the changes scheduled for the 2028–29 UEFA Nations League, in which the competition will be reduced from four leagues to three leagues of 18 teams, promotion/relegation was rebalanced to make all three upcoming leagues be at 18 teams.

The Nations League Finals will be played in a knockout format in June 2027, consisting of the semi-finals, third place play-off and final. The semi-final pairings will be determined using an open draw. The host country will be selected by the UEFA Executive Committee, preferably hosted by one of the participating teams, with the winners of the final crowned as the champions of the UEFA Nations League.

== Teams ==
League A includes sixteen teams based on the results of the 2024–25 season: the top eight teams (group winners and runners-up) from League A, the four winners of the League A/B play-offs and the four group winners from League B.

=== Team changes ===
The following were the team changes in League A from the 2024–25 season:

Incoming
Promoted from
Nations League B
- Czech Republic
- England
- Greece
- Norway
- Turkey
- Wales

Outgoing
Relegated to
Nations League B
- Bosnia and Herzegovina
- Hungary
- Israel
- Poland
- Scotland
- Switzerland

=== Seeding ===
The teams were seeded for the league phase based on the 2024–25 Nations League final overall ranking, considering promotion and relegation between the leagues and the results of the League A knockout stage.

Pot 1
Team	Rank
Portugal (TH)	1
Spain	2
France	3
Germany	4

Pot 2
Team	Rank
Italy	5
Netherlands	6
Denmark	7
Croatia	8

Pot 3
Team	Rank
Serbia	9
Belgium	10
England	11
Norway	12

Pot 4
Team	Rank
Wales	13
Czech Republic	14
Greece	15
Turkey	16

The draw for the league phase took place in Brussels, Belgium, on 12 February 2026, 18:00 CET. Groups were drawn to contain one team from each pot.

== Groups ==
The fixture list was confirmed by UEFA on 13 February 2026, the day following the draw.

Times are CET/CEST, (Note: CEST (UTC+2) for matchdays 1–4 (September and October 2026) and the quarter-final second legs (28 and 30 March 2027), CET (UTC+1) for matchdays 5–6 (November 2026) and the quarter-final first legs (25 and 27 March 2027).) as listed by UEFA (local times, if different, are in parentheses).

=== Group 1 ===
Pos	Team	Pld	W	D	L	GF	GA	GD	Pts	Qualification or relegation	(France)	(Belgium)	(Italy)	(Turkey)
1	France	6	4	1	1	10	6	+4	13	Advance to quarter-finals	—	4–1	1–1	2–1
2	Belgium	6	4	0	2	12	7	+5	12	Advance to quarter-finals	0–1	—	4–1	3–0
3	Italy	6	3	1	2	12	10	+2	10		3–1	0–2	—	3–1
4	Turkey (R)	6	0	0	6	4	15	−11	0	Relegated to League B	0–1	1–2	1–4	—

Source: UEFA
Rules for classification: Tiebreakers
(R) Relegated
25 September 2026
20:45

Italy	0–2	Belgium
	Report	Godts 20'; Lukébakio 69'

Stadio Olimpico, Rome
Attendance: 47,155
Referee: Daniel Siebert (Germany)
25 September 2026
20:45 (21:45 UTC+3)

Turkey	0–1	France
	Report	Mbappé 54'

Kocaeli Stadium, İzmit
Attendance: 28,205
Referee: Felix Zwayer (Germany)

28 September 2026
20:45

Belgium	0–1	France
	Report	Olise 88'

King Baudouin Stadium, Brussels
Attendance: 40,857
Referee: Rade Obrenović (Slovenia)
28 September 2026
20:45 (21:45 UTC+3)

Turkey	1–4	Italy
Yılmaz 47'	Report	Bastoni 9'; Frattesi 22'; Kayode 27'; P. Esposito 50'

Centennial Atatürk Stadium, Bursa
Attendance: 33,891
Referee: Michael Oliver (England)

2 October 2026
20:45

Belgium	3–0	Turkey
De Bruyne 10', 60'; Lukaku 76'	Report

Stade Maurice Dufrasne, Liège
Attendance: 24,386
Referee: Rohit Saggi (Norway)
2 October 2026
20:45

France	1–1	Italy
Olise 55'	Report	Bastoni 68'

Stade de France, Saint-Denis
Attendance: 77,118
Referee: Jesús Gil Manzano (Spain)

5 October 2026
20:45

France	4–1	Belgium
Doué 77'; Cherki 81'; Olise 88', 90+1'	Report	Lukébakio 35'

Stade de France, Saint-Denis
Attendance: 75,389
Referee: Nick Walsh (Scotland)
5 October 2026
20:45

Italy	3–1	Turkey
Scamacca 26'; Calafiori 64'; P. Esposito 87'	Report	Şimşir 61'

Stadio Renato Dall'Ara, Bologna
Attendance: 30,040
Referee: Szymon Marciniak (Poland)

12 November 2026
18:00 (20:00 UTC+3)

Turkey	1–2	Belgium
Güler 20'	Report	De Bruyne 27'; De Ketelaere 30'

Gürsel Aksel Stadium, İzmir
Attendance: 19,697
Referee: Sandro Schärer (Switzerland)
12 November 2026
20:45

Italy	3–1	France
P. Esposito 26', 75' (pen.); Frattesi 63'	Report	Olise 10'

San Siro, Milan
Attendance: 71,452
Referee: István Kovács (Romania)

15 November 2026
20:45

Belgium	4–1	Italy
De Cuyper 15'; Ngoy 22'; Doku 26'; Moreira 80'	Report	P. Esposito 11'

King Baudouin Stadium, Brussels
Attendance: 41,842
Referee: Espen Eskås (Norway)
15 November 2026
20:45

France	2–1	Turkey
Topçu 49' (o.g.); Kroupi 80'	Report	Bardakcı 90'

Stade Atlantique, Bordeaux
Attendance: 40,033
Referee: Chris Kavanagh (England)

=== Group 2 ===
Pos	Team	Pld	W	D	L	GF	GA	GD	Pts	Qualification or relegation	(Germany)	(Netherlands)	(Greece)	(Serbia)
1	Germany	6	3	2	1	11	3	+8	11 (Note: Tied on head-to-head points (5). Head-to-head goal difference: Germany +4, Netherlands +2, Greece −6.)	Advance to quarter-finals	—	5–0	0–1	2–0
2	Netherlands	6	3	2	1	14	10	+4	11	Advance to quarter-finals	1–1	—	7–0	2–1
3	Greece	6	3	2	1	6	10	−4	11		0–0	2–2	—	1–0
4	Serbia	6	0	0	6	4	12	−8	0	Qualification for relegation play-offs	1–3	1–2	1–2	—

Source: UEFA
Rules for classification: Tiebreakers
Notes:
24 September 2026
20:45

Netherlands	1–1	Germany
Gakpo 90+2'	Report	Nmecha 32'

Johan Cruyff Arena, Amsterdam
Attendance: 51,437
Referee: Alejandro Hernández Hernández (Spain)
24 September 2026
20:45

Serbia	1–2	Greece
Živković 4'	Report	Tzolis 74'; Douvikas 90+5'

Rajko Mitić Stadium, Belgrade
Attendance: 5,701
Referee: Glenn Nyberg (Sweden)

27 September 2026
18:00

Serbia	1–2	Netherlands
Jović 46'	Report	Meerdink 30' (pen.), 69'

Rajko Mitić Stadium, Belgrade
Attendance: 15,212
Referee: Szymon Marciniak (Poland)
27 September 2026
20:45

Germany	0–1	Greece
	Report	Kourbelis 74'

WWK Arena, Augsburg
Attendance: 28,945
Referee: Chris Kavanagh (England)

1 October 2026
20:45

Germany	2–0	Serbia
Bischof 39'; Wirtz 61'	Report

Allianz Arena, Munich
Attendance: 68,121
Referee: Espen Eskås (Norway)
1 October 2026
20:45 (21:45 UTC+3)

Greece	2–2	Netherlands
Ioannidis 23'; Masouras 45+2'	Report	Van Dijk 59'; Reijnders 89'

Toumba Stadium, Thessaloniki
Attendance: 26,538
Referee: Marco Guida (Italy)

4 October 2026
20:45 (21:45 UTC+3)

Greece	0–0	Germany
	Report

Toumba Stadium, Thessaloniki
Attendance: 27,599
Referee: Clément Turpin (France)
4 October 2026
20:45

Netherlands	2–1	Serbia
Koopmeiners 31'; Zirkzee 71'	Report	Cvetković 35'

Philips Stadion, Eindhoven
Attendance: 31,387
Referee: Donatas Rumšas (Lithuania)

13 November 2026
20:45

Netherlands	7–0	Greece
Summerville 6'; Reijnders 12', 18', 33'; J. Timber 40', 59'; Malen 61'	Report

Johan Cruyff Arena, Amsterdam
Attendance: 51,221
Referee: Rohit Saggi (Norway)
13 November 2026
20:45

Serbia	1–3	Germany
Babić 56'	Report	Babić 3' (o.g.); Wirtz 14'; Gruda 50'

Rajko Mitić Stadium, Belgrade
Attendance: 2,962
Referee: Javier Alberola Rojas (Spain)

16 November 2026
20:45

Germany	5–0	Netherlands
Scherhant 41'; Wirtz 60', 71'; Schlotterbeck 65'; Gruda 77'	Report

Olympiastadion, Berlin
Attendance: 71,765
Referee: Glenn Nyberg (Sweden)
16 November 2026
20:45 (21:45 UTC+2)

Greece	1–0	Serbia
Masouras 69'	Report

Panthessaliko Stadium, Volos
Attendance: 20,960
Referee: Michael Oliver (England)

=== Group 3 ===
Pos	Team	Pld	W	D	L	GF	GA	GD	Pts	Qualification or relegation	(England)	(Spain)	(Croatia)	(Czech Republic)
1	England	6	5	0	1	19	6	+13	15 (Note: Tied on head-to-head results. Overall goal difference: England +13, Spain +8.)	Advance to quarter-finals	—	2–3	2–1	3–0
2	Spain	6	5	0	1	16	8	+8	15	Advance to quarter-finals	2–3	—	4–1	3–1
3	Croatia	6	2	0	4	7	17	−10	6	Qualification for relegation play-offs	0–7	1–2	—	2–1
4	Czech Republic (R)	6	0	0	6	3	14	−11	0	Relegated to League B	0–2	0–2	1–2	—

Source: UEFA
Rules for classification: Tiebreakers
(R) Relegated
Notes:
26 September 2026
20:45

Czech Republic	1–2	Croatia
Karabec 54'	Report	Modrić 47'; Marco Pašalić 77'

Fortuna Arena, Prague
Attendance: 15,421
Referee: Simone Sozza (Italy)
26 September 2026
20:45 (19:45 UTC+1)

England	2–3	Spain
Gordon 36'; Kane 40'	Report	Yamal 2'; Baena 60'; Oyarzabal 74'

Wembley Stadium, London
Attendance: 84,525
Referee: Davide Massa (Italy)

29 September 2026
20:45

Czech Republic	0–2	England
	Report	Gordon 47'; Kane 69'

Fortuna Arena, Prague
Attendance: 18,930
Referee: Halil Umut Meler (Turkey)
29 September 2026
20:45

Spain	4–1	Croatia
Yamal 2', 63'; Pubill 31'; Williams 89'	Report	Beljo 28'

Ramón Sánchez-Pizjuán, Seville
Attendance: 40,294
Referee: Serdar Gözübüyük (Netherlands)

3 October 2026
18:00

Croatia	0–7	England
	Report	Kane 8', 53'; Bellingham 21'; Gordon 39'; Saka 45', 68'; Rogers 87'

Stadion HNK Rijeka, Rijeka
Attendance: 6,342
Referee: Sven Jablonski (Germany)
3 October 2026
20:45

Spain	3–1	Czech Republic
Yamal 6'; Rodri 35'; Merino 89'	Report	Sláma 69'

Carlos Tartiere, Oviedo
Attendance: 28,515
Referee: Vassilis Fotias (Greece)

6 October 2026
20:45

Croatia	1–2	Spain
Perišić 17'	Report	Merino 61', 88'

Stadion Poljud, Split
Attendance: 32,690
Referee: Erik Lambrechts (Belgium)
6 October 2026
20:45 (19:45 UTC+1)

England	3–0	Czech Republic
Coufal 27' (o.g.); Kane 40', 57'	Report

Wembley Stadium, London
Attendance: 78,864
Referee: Serdar Gözübüyük (Netherlands)

12 November 2026
20:45

Czech Republic	0–2	Spain
	Report	Baena 39' (pen.); Pubill 90+6'

Stadion Letná, Prague
Attendance: 18,193
Referee: Nikola Dabanović (Montenegro)
12 November 2026
20:45 (19:45 UTC+0)

England	2–1	Croatia
Rogers 24'; Kane 64' (pen.)	Report	P. Sučić 59'

Wembley Stadium, London
Attendance: 80,484
Referee: Morten Krogh (Denmark)

15 November 2026
20:45

Croatia	2–1	Czech Republic
Perišić 2'; Majer 87'	Report	Hložek 84'

Opus Arena, Osijek
Attendance: 12,009
Referee: Luís Godinho (Portugal)
15 November 2026
20:45

Spain	2–3	England
Oyarzabal 65' (pen.); Williams 75'	Report	Kane 45' (pen.); Konsa 53'; White 57'

Metropolitano Stadium, Madrid
Attendance: 63,788
Referee: Clément Turpin (France)

=== Group 4 ===
Pos	Team	Pld	W	D	L	GF	GA	GD	Pts	Qualification	(Portugal)	(Norway)	(Denmark)	(Wales)
1	Portugal	6	5	0	1	13	10	+3	15	Advance to quarter-finals	—	2–1	1–4	1–0
2	Norway	6	3	0	3	12	11	+1	9 (Note: Head-to-head points: Norway 6, Denmark 0.)	Advance to quarter-finals	1–2	—	3–2	3–1
3	Denmark	6	3	0	3	13	11	+2	9	Qualification for relegation play-offs	2–4	2–3	—	2–0
4	Wales	6	1	0	5	5	11	−6	3	Qualification for relegation play-offs	2–3	2–1	0–1	—

Source: UEFA
Rules for classification: Tiebreakers
Notes:
24 September 2026
20:45

Norway	3–2	Denmark
Bobb 14'; Haaland 18', 74'	Report	Damsgaard 25'; Højlund 60'

Ullevaal Stadion, Oslo
Attendance: 25,002
Referee: Tobias Stieler (Germany)
24 September 2026
20:45 (19:45 UTC+1)

Portugal	1–0	Wales
Félix 22'	Report

Estádio José Alvalade, Lisbon
Attendance: 47,725
Referee: Donatas Rumšas (Lithuania)

27 September 2026
18:00

Denmark	2–0	Wales
Davies 53' (o.g.); Isaksen 66'	Report

Parken Stadium, Copenhagen
Attendance: 34,588
Referee: Willy Delajod (France)
27 September 2026
20:45

Norway	1–2	Portugal
Haaland 51'	Report	Félix 17'; Ramos 54'

Ullevaal Stadion, Oslo
Attendance: 25,953
Referee: François Letexier (France)

1 October 2026
20:45

Denmark	2–4	Portugal
Damsgaard 23'; Højlund 53'	Report	Cancelo 13'; Ramos 25'; Vitinha 67'; Félix 87'

Parken Stadium, Copenhagen
Attendance: 35,951
Referee: Mykola Balakin (Ukraine)
1 October 2026
20:45 (19:45 UTC+1)

Wales	2–1	Norway
James 38'; Williams 48'	Report	Bobb 11'

Cardiff City Stadium, Cardiff
Attendance: 32,076
Referee: Alejandro Hernández Hernández (Spain)

4 October 2026
20:45 (19:45 UTC+1)

Portugal	2–1	Norway
Cancelo 38'; Ramos 79'	Report	Ajer 36'

Estádio do Dragão, Porto
Attendance: 48,832
Referee: Maurizio Mariani (Italy)
4 October 2026
20:45 (19:45 UTC+1)

Wales	0–1	Denmark
	Report	Højlund 75' (pen.)

Cardiff City Stadium, Cardiff
Attendance: 25,108
Referee: Irfan Peljto (Bosnia and Herzegovina)

14 November 2026
18:00

Norway	3–1	Wales
Nusa 59'; Schjelderup 68'; Haaland 88' (pen.)	Report	Brooks 79'

Ullevaal Stadion, Oslo
Attendance: 25,317
Referee: Oleksiy Derevinskyi (Ukraine)
14 November 2026
20:45 (19:45 UTC+0)

Portugal	1–4	Denmark
B. Silva 90+3'	Report	Højbjerg 43' (pen.); Højlund 50', 57'; Andersen 75'

Estádio Municipal, Braga
Attendance: 24,879
Referee: Rade Obrenović (Slovenia)

17 November 2026
20:45

Denmark	2–3	Norway
Højlund 11'; Højbjerg 14'	Report	Haaland 37', 90+6' (pen.); Ødegaard 83'

Parken Stadium, Copenhagen
Attendance: 36,047
Referee: Halil Umut Meler (Turkey)
17 November 2026
20:45 (19:45 UTC+0)

Wales	2–3	Portugal
Brooks 13'; Thomas 40'	Report	Fernandes 11'; Neto 43'; Forbs 70'

Cardiff City Stadium, Cardiff
Attendance: 32,682
Referee: Sven Jablonski (Germany)

== Ranking of third-placed teams ==
Pos	Grp	Team	Pld	W	D	L	GF	GA	GD	Pts	Qualification
1	A2	Greece	6	3	2	1	6	10	−4	11	
2	A1	Italy	6	3	1	2	12	10	+2	10	
3	A4	Denmark	6	3	0	3	13	11	+2	9	Qualification for relegation play-offs
4	A3	Croatia	6	2	0	4	7	17	−10	6	Qualification for relegation play-offs

Source: UEFA
Rules for classification: Ranking criteria

== Ranking of fourth-placed teams ==
Pos	Grp	Team	Pld	W	D	L	GF	GA	GD	Pts	Qualification or relegation
1	A4	Wales	6	1	0	5	5	11	−6	3	Qualification for relegation play-offs
2	A2	Serbia	6	0	0	6	4	12	−8	0	Qualification for relegation play-offs
3	A1	Turkey (R)	6	0	0	6	4	15	−11	0	Relegated to League B
4	A3	Czech Republic (R)	6	0	0	6	3	14	−11	0	Relegated to League B

Source: UEFA
Rules for classification: Ranking criteria
(R) Relegated

== Knockout stage ==
=== Bracket ===
Quarter-finals
Netherlands
Portugal
Spain
France
Belgium
Germany
Norway
England

Semi-finals
9–10 June – TBC
Winner quarter-final 3
Winner quarter-final 1
9–10 June – TBC
Winner quarter-final 4
Winner quarter-final 2

Final
13 June – TBC
Winner semi-final A
Winner semi-final B
Third place play-off
13 June – TBC
Loser UNLF Match 1
Loser UNLF Match 2

=== Quarter-finals ===
The draw for the quarter-finals will be held on 20 November 2026, 12:00 CET. In the draw, teams from the same group cannot be drawn against each other.

==== Seeding ====
The group winners will be seeded in the draw, while the runners-up will be unseeded. The Nations League interim overall ranking of November 2026 is shown below in brackets.

Quarter-final draw pots
Group	Winners (seeded in Pot 1)	Runners-up (unseeded in Pot 2)
A1	France (3)	Belgium (6)
A2	Germany (4)	Netherlands (7)
A3	England (1)	Spain (5)
A4	Portugal (2)	Norway (8)

==== Summary ====
The first legs will be played on 25 and 27 March, and the second legs will be played on 28 and 30 March 2027.

Team 1	Agg.	Team 2	1st leg	2nd leg
Spain	1	France	25 Mar	28 Mar
Norway	2	England	27 Mar	30 Mar
Netherlands	3	Portugal	27 Mar	30 Mar
Belgium	4	Germany	25 Mar	28 Mar

==== Matches ====
Times are CET/CEST, as listed by UEFA (local times, if different, are in parentheses).

25 March 2027
20:45

Spain	v	France
	Report

28 March 2027
20:45

France	v	Spain
	Report

27 March 2027
18:00

Norway	v	England
	Report

30 March 2027
20:45 (19:45 UTC+1)

England	v	Norway
	Report

27 March 2027
20:45

Netherlands	v	Portugal
	Report

30 March 2027
20:45 (19:45 UTC+1)

Portugal	v	Netherlands
	Report

25 March 2027
20:45

Belgium	v	Germany
	Report

28 March 2027
20:45

Germany	v	Belgium
	Report

=== Nations League Finals ===
The host of the Nations League Finals will preferably be selected from the four qualified teams. The semi-finals pairings will be determined by means of an open draw. For scheduling purposes, the host team will be allocated to semi-final 1 as the administrative home team.

Times are CEST (UTC+2), as listed by UEFA.

==== Semi-finals ====
9–10 June 2027
21:00

Winner quarter-final 3	Semi-final A	Winner quarter-final 1

9–10 June 2027
21:00

Winner quarter-final 4	Semi-final B	Winner quarter-final 2

==== Third place play-off ====
13 June 2027
15:00

Loser Match 1	Match 3	Loser Match 2

==== Final ====
13 June 2027
21:00

Winner Match 1	Match 4	Winner Match 2

== Goalscorers ==
There have been 161 goals scored in 48 matches, for an average of 3.35 goals per match (as of 17 November 2026).

8 goals

- (England national football team) Harry Kane

6 goals

- (Denmark national football team) Rasmus Højlund
- (Norway national football team) Erling Haaland

5 goals

- (France national football team) Michael Olise
- (Italy national football team) Pio Esposito

4 goals

- (Germany national football team) Florian Wirtz
- (Netherlands national football team) Tijjani Reijnders
- (Spain national football team) Lamine Yamal

3 goals

- (Belgium national football team) Kevin De Bruyne
- (England national football team) Anthony Gordon
- (Portugal national football team) João Félix
- (Portugal national football team) Gonçalo Ramos
- (Spain national football team) Mikel Merino

2 goals

- (Belgium national football team) Dodi Lukébakio
- (Croatia national football team) Ivan Perišić
- (Denmark national football team) Mikkel Damsgaard
- (Denmark national football team) Pierre-Emile Højbjerg
- (England national football team) Morgan Rogers
- (England national football team) Bukayo Saka
- (Germany national football team) Brajan Gruda
- (Greece national football team) Giorgos Masouras
- (Italy national football team) Alessandro Bastoni
- (Italy national football team) Davide Frattesi
- (Netherlands national football team) Mexx Meerdink
- (Netherlands national football team) Jurriën Timber
- (Norway national football team) Oscar Bobb
- (Portugal national football team) João Cancelo
- (Spain national football team) Álex Baena
- (Spain national football team) Mikel Oyarzabal
- (Spain national football team) Marc Pubill
- (Spain national football team) Nico Williams
- (Wales national football team) David Brooks

1 goal

- (Belgium national football team) Maxim De Cuyper
- (Belgium national football team) Charles De Ketelaere
- (Belgium national football team) Jérémy Doku
- (Belgium national football team) Mika Godts
- (Belgium national football team) Romelu Lukaku
- (Belgium national football team) Diego Moreira
- (Belgium national football team) Nathan Ngoy
- (Croatia national football team) Dion Drena Beljo
- (Croatia national football team) Lovro Majer
- (Croatia national football team) Luka Modrić
- (Croatia national football team) Marco Pašalić
- (Croatia national football team) Petar Sučić
- (Czech Republic national football team) Adam Hložek
- (Czech Republic national football team) Adam Karabec
- (Czech Republic national football team) Jiří Sláma
- (Denmark national football team) Joachim Andersen
- (Denmark national football team) Gustav Isaksen
- (England national football team) Jude Bellingham
- (England national football team) Ezri Konsa
- (England national football team) Ben White
- (France national football team) Rayan Cherki
- (France national football team) Désiré Doué
- (France national football team) Eli Junior Kroupi
- (France national football team) Kylian Mbappé
- (Germany national football team) Tom Bischof
- (Germany national football team) Felix Nmecha
- (Germany national football team) Derry Scherhant
- (Germany national football team) Nico Schlotterbeck
- (Greece national football team) Anastasios Douvikas
- (Greece national football team) Fotis Ioannidis
- (Greece national football team) Dimitrios Kourbelis
- (Greece national football team) Christos Tzolis
- (Italy national football team) Riccardo Calafiori
- (Italy national football team) Michael Kayode
- (Italy national football team) Gianluca Scamacca
- (Netherlands national football team) Cody Gakpo
- (Netherlands national football team) Teun Koopmeiners
- (Netherlands national football team) Donyell Malen
- (Netherlands national football team) Crysencio Summerville
- (Netherlands national football team) Virgil van Dijk
- (Netherlands national football team) Joshua Zirkzee
- (Norway national football team) Kristoffer Ajer
- (Norway national football team) Antonio Nusa
- (Norway national football team) Martin Ødegaard
- (Norway national football team) Andreas Schjelderup
- (Portugal national football team) Bruno Fernandes
- (Portugal national football team) Carlos Forbs
- (Portugal national football team) Pedro Neto
- (Portugal national football team) Bernardo Silva
- (Portugal national football team) Vitinha
- (Serbia national football team) Srđan Babić
- (Serbia national football team) Mihajlo Cvetković
- (Serbia national football team) Luka Jović
- (Serbia national football team) Andrija Živković
- (Spain national football team) Rodri
- (Turkey national football team) Barış Alper Yılmaz
- (Turkey national football team) Abdülkerim Bardakcı
- (Turkey national football team) Arda Güler
- (Turkey national football team) Aral Şimşir
- (Wales national football team) Daniel James
- (Wales national football team) Sorba Thomas
- (Wales national football team) Neco Williams

1 own goal

- (Czech Republic national football team) Vladimír Coufal (against England)
- (Serbia national football team) Srđan Babić (against Germany)
- (Turkey national football team) Emirhan Topçu (against France)
- (Wales national football team) Ben Davies (against Denmark)

== Overall ranking ==
Following the league phase, the 16 League A teams will be ordered 1st to 16th in an interim overall ranking for the 2026–27 UEFA Nations League according to the following rules:

- The teams finishing first in the groups will be ranked 1st to 4th according to the results of the league phase.
- The teams finishing second in the groups will be ranked 5th to 8th according to the results of the league phase.
- The teams finishing third in the groups will be ranked 9th to 12th according to the results of the league phase.
- The teams finishing fourth in the groups will be ranked 13th to 16th according to the results of the league phase.

Rnk	Grp	Team	Pld	W	D	L	GF	GA	GD	Pts
1	A3	England	6	5	0	1	19	6	+13	15
2	A4	Portugal	6	5	0	1	13	10	+3	15
3	A1	France	6	4	1	1	10	6	+4	13
4	A2	Germany	6	3	2	1	11	3	+8	11
5	A3	Spain	6	5	0	1	16	8	+8	15
6	A1	Belgium	6	4	0	2	12	7	+5	12
7	A2	Netherlands	6	3	2	1	14	10	+4	11
8	A4	Norway	6	3	0	3	12	11	+1	9
9	A2	Greece	6	3	2	1	6	10	−4	11
10	A1	Italy	6	3	1	2	12	10	+2	10
11	A4	Denmark	6	3	0	3	13	11	+2	9
12	A3	Croatia	6	2	0	4	7	17	−10	6
13	A4	Wales	6	1	0	5	5	11	−6	3
14	A2	Serbia	6	0	0	6	4	12	−8	0
15	A1	Turkey	6	0	0	6	4	15	−11	0
16	A3	Czech Republic	6	0	0	6	3	14	−11	0

Source: UEFA
Rules for classification: Ranking criteria

A final overall ranking will also be compiled, though this is only used to rank teams within their new leagues for the following edition of the competition.
