= 2026–27 UEFA Nations League promotion/relegation play-offs =

Tournament details
- Dates: 25–30 March 2027
- Teams: 16

The 2026–27 UEFA Nations League promotion/relegation play-offs are matches deciding promotion and relegation for some teams in the 2026–27 season of the UEFA Nations League, the fifth season of the international football competition involving the men's national teams of the member associations of UEFA. The play-offs will determine which of the 20 participating teams will be promoted, relegated or remain in their respective leagues for the 2028–29 season. The play-offs complement the automatic promotion and relegation already decided during the league phase of the competition.

== Format ==
The two worst third-placed teams and two best last-placed teams of League A will face the runners-up of League B, and the last-placed teams of League B will face the runners-up of League C. The matches will be played home-and-away over two legs in March 2027, with the winners going to the higher league and the losers entering the lower league.

Originally, the format for promotion and relegation would have involved only the group winners of League D being promoted, as well as all last-placed teams in Leagues A and B being relegated alongside the two worst last-placed teams in League C. The promotion/relegation play-offs would have concerned all third-place teams in Leagues A and B and all runners-up in Leagues B and C, with extra play-offs concerning the two best last-places in League C and both runners-up in League D to be held in March 2028. However, due to the changes scheduled for the 2028–29 UEFA Nations League, in which the competition will be reduced from four leagues to three leagues of 18 teams, promotion/relegation was rebalanced to make all three upcoming leagues consist of 18 teams.

The match-ups in the promotion/relegation play-offs are as follows:

- The two worst third-placed teams and two best fourth-placed teams of League A will face the runners-up of League B (four ties in March 2027).
- The fourth-placed teams of League B will face the runners-up of League C (four ties in March 2027).

The teams from the higher leagues will be seeded, and will play the second leg at home. In the two-legged ties, the team that scores more goals on aggregate is the winner. If the aggregate score is level, extra time will be played (the away goals rule is not applied). If the score remains level after extra time, a penalty shoot-out will be used to decide the winner.

== Qualified teams ==
The following teams qualified for the promotion/relegation play-offs.

League A
Group	Third place (worst two qualified)/ Fourth place (best two qualified)
A2	Serbia
A3	Croatia
A4	Denmark
A4	Wales

League B
Group	Runners-up	Fourth place
B1	Slovenia	North Macedonia
B2	Hungary	Georgia
B3	Republic of Ireland	Israel
B4	Bosnia and Herzegovina	Romania

League C
Group	Runners-up
C1	Belarus
C2	Cyprus
C3	Faroe Islands
C4	Estonia

== Draw ==
The draw for the promotion/relegation play-offs was held on 20 November 2026 at the UEFA headquarters in Nyon, Switzerland, along with the draw for the League A quarter-finals. In the draw, the teams from the higher leagues were seeded and drawn to host the second leg, while the teams from the lower leagues were unseeded and drawn to host the first leg. First, all teams from the unseeded pot were drawn into pairings in order (from pairing 1–4 for A/B and B/C), after which teams from the seeded pot were randomly drawn into the pairings (in numerical order) as their opponents.

== Schedule ==
The first legs will be played on 25 and 27 March, and the second legs will be played on 28 and 30 March 2027.

Times are CET/CEST, (Note: CET (UTC+1) for the first legs (25 and 27 March), and CEST (UTC+2) for the second legs (28 and 30 March 2027).) as listed by UEFA (local times, if different, are in parentheses).

== League A vs League B ==
The League A/B play-offs feature the two worst third-placed and two best fourth-placed teams of League A against the four second-placed teams of League B.

=== Seeding ===
Pot 1 League A (seeded)
Team	Rank
Denmark	11
Croatia	12
Wales	13
Serbia	14

Pot 2 League B (unseeded)
Team	Rank
Slovenia	21
Bosnia and Herzegovina	22
Hungary	23
Republic of Ireland	24

=== Summary ===
Team 1	Agg.	Team 2	1st leg	2nd leg
Bosnia and Herzegovina		Denmark	25 Mar	28 Mar
Hungary		Serbia	25 Mar	28 Mar
Republic of Ireland		Croatia	27 Mar	30 Mar
Slovenia		Wales	27 Mar	30 Mar

=== Matches ===
25 March 2027
20:45

Bosnia and Herzegovina	v	Denmark
	Report

28 March 2027
20:45

Denmark	v	Bosnia and Herzegovina
	Report

25 March 2027
20:45

Hungary	v	Serbia
	Report

28 March 2027
18:00

Serbia	v	Hungary
	Report

27 March 2027
20:45 (19:45 UTC+0)

Republic of Ireland	v	Croatia
	Report

30 March 2027
20:45

Croatia	v	Republic of Ireland
	Report

27 March 2027
20:45

Slovenia	v	Wales
	Report

30 March 2027
20:45 (19:45 UTC+1)

Wales	v	Slovenia
	Report

== League B vs League C ==
=== Seeding ===
Pot 1 League B (seeded)
Team	Rank
Israel	29
Romania	30
Georgia	31
North Macedonia	32

Pot 2 League C (unseeded)
Team	Rank
Estonia	37
Belarus	38
Faroe Islands	39
Cyprus	40

=== Summary ===
Team 1	Agg.	Team 2	1st leg	2nd leg
Cyprus		North Macedonia	25 Mar	28 Mar
Estonia		Romania	27 Mar	30 Mar
Faroe Islands		Georgia	27 Mar	30 Mar
Belarus		Israel	25 Mar	28 Mar

=== Matches ===
25 March 2027
18:00 (19:00 UTC+2)

Cyprus	v	North Macedonia
	Report

28 March 2027
15:00

North Macedonia	v	Cyprus
	Report

27 March 2027
18:00 (19:00 UTC+2)

Estonia	v	Romania
	Report

30 March 2027
20:45 (21:45 UTC+3)

Romania	v	Estonia
	Report

27 March 2027
15:00 (14:00 UTC+0)

Faroe Islands	v	Georgia
	Report

30 March 2027
18:00 (20:00 UTC+4)

Georgia	v	Faroe Islands
	Report

25 March 2027
20:45

Belarus	v	Israel
	Report

TBC (Note: Due to Belarusian involvement in the Russian invasion of Ukraine, Belarus are required to play their home matches at neutral venues, and behind closed doors, until further notice.)
Attendance: 0
28 March 2027
20:45

Israel	v	Belarus
	Report

TBC (Note: Due to the Middle Eastern crisis, Israel are required to play their home matches at neutral venues.)
