= 2024–25 UEFA Nations League A =

Tournament details
- Dates: League phase: 5 September – 19 November 2024; Quarter-finals: 20–23 March 2025; Nations League Finals: 4–8 June 2025
- Teams: 16

Final positions
- Champions: Portugal (2nd title)
- Runners-up: Spain
- Third place: France
- Fourth place: Germany
- Relegated: Bosnia and Herzegovina; Hungary; Israel; Poland; Scotland; Switzerland

Tournament statistics
- Matches played: 60
- Goals scored: 190 (3.17 per match)
- Attendance: 2,234,254 (37,238 per match)
- Top scorer(s): (Portugal) Cristiano Ronaldo (8 goals)

The 2024–25 UEFA Nations League A was the top division of the 2024–25 edition of the UEFA Nations League, the fourth season of the international football competition involving the men's national teams of the 55 member associations of UEFA. League A began with the league phase in September 2024, and culminated with the Nations League Finals in June 2025 to determine the champions of the competition.

For the first time, a quarter-final round was contested in League A by the group winners and runners-up, with the winners advancing to the Nations League Finals.

Spain were the defending champions, having won the 2023 finals.

Portugal won the final against Spain, 5–3 on penalties following a 2–2 draw after extra time, for their second UEFA Nations League title.

== Format ==
League A consisted of the 16 top-ranked UEFA members in the 2024–25 UEFA Nations League access list, split into four groups of four. Each team played six matches within their group, using the home-and-away round-robin format on double matchdays in September, October and November 2024.

On 25 January 2023, the UEFA Executive Committee approved a modified format for the Nations League after the league phase, with the following changes being implemented in League A:

- A new quarter-final round to be played in March 2025 was introduced, thus creating continuity between the league phase ending in November 2024 and the Nations League Finals in June 2025.
- The winners and runners-up of each group advanced to the quarter-finals, unlike previous editions where only the group winners advanced to the finals.
- The four third-placed teams of League A faced the four runners-up of League B in the relegation play-offs, which were also introduced starting this season.

The last-placed teams of each group continued to be relegated directly to League B, while the third-placed teams competed against the runners-up of League B to determine their permanence in League A for the next season or their relegation to 2026–27 UEFA Nations League B. The relegation play-offs were played home-and-away over two legs in March 2025, with the League A third-placed teams hosting the second leg.

The quarter-finals were also played home and away over two legs. In each tie, group winners faced a runner-up from a different group, with the group winner hosting the second leg. The four quarter-final winners advanced to the Finals.

The Nations League Finals retained its previous format, which was played in a knockout format in June 2025, consisting of the semi-finals, third place play-off, and final. The semi-final pairings were determined using an open draw. The host country was selected by the UEFA Executive Committee, preferably hosted by one of the participating teams, with the winners of the final crowned as the champions of the UEFA Nations League.

In all two-legged ties, the team that scored more goals on aggregate was the winner. If the aggregate score was level, extra time was played without the away goals rule. If the score remained level after extra time, a penalty shoot-out was used to decide the winner.

== Teams ==
The 16 League A teams included the top 12 teams from the 2022–23 League A overall ranking and four promoted teams from the 2022–23 League B.

=== Team changes ===
The following were the team changes in League A from the 2022–23 season:

Incoming
Promoted from
Nations League B
- Bosnia and Herzegovina
- Israel
- Scotland
- Serbia

Outgoing
Relegated to
Nations League B
- Austria
- Czech Republic
- England
- Wales

Bosnia and Herzegovina returned to League A, after a one-season absence, by securing first place in their 2022–23 League B group with a 1–0 victory over Montenegro on 23 September 2022. Israel, Scotland and Serbia reached the top flight of the UEFA Nations League for the first time, all three following similar paths, starting in League C in the inaugural edition and spending two seasons in League B before their promotion to League A.

=== Seeding ===
In the 2024–25 access list, UEFA ranked teams based on the 2022–23 Nations League overall ranking, considering promotion and relegation between the leagues and the results of the 2023 UEFA Nations League Finals. The seeding pots for the league phase were confirmed on 2 December 2023, and were based on the access list ranking.

Pot 1
Team	Rank
Spain (title holders)	1
Croatia	2
Italy	3
Netherlands	4

Pot 2
Team	Rank
Denmark	5
Portugal	6
Belgium	7
Hungary	8

Pot 3
Team	Rank
Switzerland	9
Germany	10
Poland	11
France	12

Pot 4
Team	Rank
Israel	13
Bosnia and Herzegovina	14
Serbia	15
Scotland	16

The draw for the league phase took place at the Maison de la Mutualité in Paris, France, on 8 February 2024, 18:00 CET. Each group contained one team from each pot.

== Groups ==
The fixture list was confirmed by UEFA on 9 February 2024, the day following the draw.

Times are CET/CEST, (Note: CEST (UTC+2) for matchdays 1–4 (September and October 2024), CET (UTC+1) for matchdays 5–6 (November 2024).) as listed by UEFA (local times, if different, are in parentheses).

=== Group 1 ===
Pos	Team	Pld	W	D	L	GF	GA	GD	Pts	Qualification or relegation	(Portugal)	(Croatia)	(Scotland)	(Poland)
1	Portugal	6	4	2	0	13	5	+8	14	Advance to quarter-finals	—	2–1	2–1	5–1
2	Croatia	6	2	2	2	8	8	0	8	Advance to quarter-finals	1–1	—	2–1	1–0
3	Scotland (R)	6	2	1	3	7	8	−1	7	Qualification for relegation play-offs	0–0	1–0	—	2–3
4	Poland (R)	6	1	1	4	9	16	−7	4	Relegation to League B	1–3	3–3	1–2	—

Source: UEFA
Rules for classification: Tiebreakers
(R) Relegated
5 September 2024
20:45 (19:45 UTC+1)

Portugal	2–1	Croatia
Dalot 7'; Ronaldo 34'	Report	Dalot 41' (o.g.)

Estádio da Luz, Lisbon
Attendance: 57,675
Referee: Halil Umut Meler (Turkey)
5 September 2024
20:45 (19:45 UTC+1)

Scotland	2–3	Poland
Gilmour 46'; McTominay 76'	Report	S. Szymański 8'; Lewandowski 44' (pen.); Zalewski 90+7' (pen.)

Hampden Park, Glasgow
Attendance: 46,356
Referee: Glenn Nyberg (Sweden)

8 September 2024
20:45

Croatia	1–0	Poland
Modrić 52'	Report

Opus Arena, Osijek
Attendance: 12,612
Referee: François Letexier (France)
8 September 2024
20:45 (19:45 UTC+1)

Portugal	2–1	Scotland
Fernandes 54'; Ronaldo 88'	Report	McTominay 7'

Estádio da Luz, Lisbon
Attendance: 59,894
Referee: Maurizio Mariani (Italy)

12 October 2024
18:00

Croatia	2–1	Scotland
Matanović 36'; Kramarić 70'	Report	Christie 33'

Stadion Maksimir, Zagreb
Attendance: 21,702
Referee: István Kovács (Romania)
12 October 2024
20:45

Poland	1–3	Portugal
Zieliński 78'	Report	B. Silva 26'; Ronaldo 37'; Bednarek 88' (o.g.)

Stadion Narodowy, Warsaw
Attendance: 56,854
Referee: Serdar Gözübüyük (Netherlands).

15 October 2024
20:45

Poland	3–3	Croatia
Zieliński 5'; Zalewski 45'; S. Szymański 68'	Report	Sosa 19'; P. Sučić 24'; Baturina 26'

Stadion Narodowy, Warsaw
Attendance: 56,103
Referee: Alejandro Hernández Hernández (Spain)
15 October 2024
20:45 (19:45 UTC+1)

Scotland	0–0	Portugal
	Report

Hampden Park, Glasgow
Attendance: 49,057
Referee: Lawrence Visser (Belgium)

15 November 2024
20:45 (19:45 UTC+0)

Portugal	5–1	Poland
Leão 59'; Ronaldo 72' (pen.), 87'; Fernandes 80'; Neto 83'	Report	Marczuk 88'

Estádio do Dragão, Porto
Attendance: 47,239
Referee: Donatas Rumšas (Lithuania)
15 November 2024
20:45 (19:45 UTC+0)

Scotland	1–0	Croatia
McGinn 86'	Report

Hampden Park, Glasgow
Attendance: 48,810
Referee: Orel Grinfeeld (Israel)

18 November 2024
20:45

Croatia	1–1	Portugal
Gvardiol 65'	Report	Félix 33'

Stadion Poljud, Split
Attendance: 33,386
Referee: Davide Massa (Italy)
18 November 2024
20:45

Poland	1–2	Scotland
Piątkowski 59'	Report	McGinn 3'; Robertson 90+3'

Stadion Narodowy, Warsaw
Attendance: 55,433
Referee: Christian Dingert (Germany)

=== Group 2 ===
Pos	Team	Pld	W	D	L	GF	GA	GD	Pts	Qualification or relegation	(France)	(Italy)	(Belgium)	(Israel)
1	France	6	4	1	1	12	6	+6	13 (Note: Tied on head to head results. Overall goal difference: France +6, Italy +5.)	Advance to quarter-finals	—	1–3	2–0	0–0
2	Italy	6	4	1	1	13	8	+5	13	Advance to quarter-finals	1–3	—	2–2	4–1
3	Belgium (O)	6	1	1	4	6	9	−3	4 (Note: Tied on head to head points. Head to head goal difference: Belgium +1, Israel –1.)	Qualification for relegation play-offs	1–2	0–1	—	3–1
4	Israel (R)	6	1	1	4	5	13	−8	4	Relegation to League B	1–4	1–2	1–0	—

Source: UEFA
Rules for classification: Tiebreakers
(O) Play-off winners; (R) Relegated
Notes:
6 September 2024
20:45

Belgium	3–1	Israel
De Bruyne 21', 52' (pen.); Tielemans 48'	Report	Castagne 36' (o.g.)

Nagyerdei Stadion, Debrecen (Hungary) (Note: Due to the Gaza war protests, the Belgium v Israel match was played at a neutral venue and behind closed doors.)
Attendance: 0
Referee: Michael Oliver (England)
6 September 2024
20:45

France	1–3	Italy
Barcola 1'	Report	Dimarco 30'; Frattesi 51'; Raspadori 74'

Parc des Princes, Paris
Attendance: 44,956
Referee: Sandro Schärer (Switzerland)

9 September 2024
20:45

France	2–0	Belgium
Kolo Muani 29'; Dembélé 57'	Report

Parc Olympique Lyonnais, Décines-Charpieu
Attendance: 42,358
Referee: Tobias Stieler (Germany)
9 September 2024
20:45

Israel	1–2	Italy
Abu Fani 90'	Report	Frattesi 38'; Kean 62'

Bozsik Aréna, Budapest (Hungary) (Note: Due to the Gaza war, Israel were required to play their home matches at neutral venues until further notice.)
Attendance: 2,090
Referee: Ivan Kružliak (Slovakia)

10 October 2024
20:45

Israel	1–4	France
Gandelman 24'	Report	Camavinga 7'; Nkunku 28'; Guendouzi 87'; Barcola 89'

Bozsik Aréna, Budapest (Hungary)
Attendance: 2,226
Referee: Nikola Dabanović (Montenegro)
10 October 2024
20:45

Italy	2–2	Belgium
Cambiaso 1'; Retegui 24'	Report	De Cuyper 42'; Trossard 61'

Stadio Olimpico, Rome
Attendance: 44,297
Referee: Espen Eskås (Norway)

14 October 2024
20:45

Belgium	1–2	France
Openda 45+3'	Report	Kolo Muani 35' (pen.), 62'

King Baudouin Stadium, Brussels
Attendance: 39,731
Referee: Irfan Peljto (Bosnia and Herzegovina)
14 October 2024
20:45

Italy	4–1	Israel
Retegui 41' (pen.); Di Lorenzo 54', 79'; Frattesi 72'	Report	Abu Fani 66'

Stadio Friuli, Udine
Attendance: 11,700
Referee: Ricardo de Burgos Bengoetxea (Spain)

14 November 2024
20:45

Belgium	0–1	Italy
	Report	Tonali 11'

King Baudouin Stadium, Brussels
Attendance: 41,367
Referee: Radu Petrescu (Romania)
14 November 2024
20:45

France	0–0	Israel
	Report

Stade de France, Saint-Denis
Attendance: 16,611
Referee: Tobias Stieler (Germany)

17 November 2024
20:45

Israel	1–0	Belgium
Shua 86'	Report

Bozsik Aréna, Budapest (Hungary)
Attendance: 675
Referee: Sebastian Gishamer (Austria)
17 November 2024
20:45

Italy	1–3	France
Cambiaso 35'	Report	Rabiot 2', 65'; Vicario 33' (o.g.)

San Siro, Milan
Attendance: 68,158
Referee: Slavko Vinčić (Slovenia)

=== Group 3 ===
Pos	Team	Pld	W	D	L	GF	GA	GD	Pts	Qualification or relegation	(Germany)	(Netherlands)	(Hungary)	(Bosnia and Herzegovina)
1	Germany	6	4	2	0	18	4	+14	14	Advance to quarter-finals	—	1–0	5–0	7–0
2	Netherlands	6	2	3	1	13	7	+6	9	Advance to quarter-finals	2–2	—	4–0	5–2
3	Hungary (R)	6	1	3	2	4	11	−7	6	Qualification for relegation play-offs	1–1	1–1	—	0–0
4	Bosnia and Herzegovina (R)	6	0	2	4	4	17	−13	2	Relegation to League B	1–2	1–1	0–2	—

Source: UEFA
Rules for classification: Tiebreakers
(R) Relegated
7 September 2024
20:45

Germany	5–0	Hungary
Füllkrug 27'; Musiala 58'; Wirtz 66'; Pavlović 77'; Havertz 81' (pen.)	Report

Merkur Spiel-Arena, Düsseldorf
Attendance: 49,235
Referee: Clément Turpin (France)
7 September 2024
20:45

Netherlands	5–2	Bosnia and Herzegovina
Zirkzee 13'; Reijnders 45+2'; Gakpo 56'; Weghorst 88'; Simons 90+2'	Report	Demirović 27'; Džeko 73'

Philips Stadion, Eindhoven
Attendance: 31,139
Referee: Donatas Rumšas (Lithuania)

10 September 2024
20:45

Hungary	0–0	Bosnia and Herzegovina
	Report

Puskás Aréna, Budapest
Attendance: 46,443
Referee: Marco Guida (Italy)
10 September 2024
20:45

Netherlands	2–2	Germany
Reijnders 2'; Dumfries 50'	Report	Undav 38'; Kimmich 45+3'

Johan Cruyff Arena, Amsterdam
Attendance: 50,109
Referee: Davide Massa (Italy)

11 October 2024
20:45

Bosnia and Herzegovina	1–2	Germany
Džeko 70'	Report	Undav 30', 36'

Bilino Polje Stadium, Zenica
Attendance: 11,000
Referee: François Letexier (France)
11 October 2024
20:45

Hungary	1–1	Netherlands
Sallai 32'	Report	Dumfries 83'

Puskás Aréna, Budapest
Attendance: 55,300
Referee: Lukas Fähndrich (Switzerland)

14 October 2024
20:45

Bosnia and Herzegovina	0–2	Hungary
	Report	Szoboszlai 38', 50' (pen.)

Bilino Polje Stadium, Zenica
Attendance: 8,329
Referee: Anthony Taylor (England)
14 October 2024
20:45

Germany	1–0	Netherlands
Leweling 64'	Report

Allianz Arena, Munich
Attendance: 68,367
Referee: Slavko Vinčić (Slovenia)

16 November 2024
20:45

Germany	7–0	Bosnia and Herzegovina
Musiala 2'; Kleindienst 23', 79'; Havertz 37'; Wirtz 50', 57'; Sané 66'	Report

Europa-Park Stadion, Freiburg
Attendance: 28,143
Referee: Vassilis Fotias (Greece)
16 November 2024
20:45

Netherlands	4–0	Hungary
Weghorst 21' (pen.); Gakpo 45+12' (pen.); Dumfries 64'; Koopmeiners 86'	Report

Johan Cruyff Arena, Amsterdam
Attendance: 51,611
Referee: Jesús Gil Manzano (Spain)

19 November 2024
20:45

Bosnia and Herzegovina	1–1	Netherlands
Demirović 67'	Report	Brobbey 24'

Bilino Polje Stadium, Zenica
Attendance: 4,134
Referee: Aliyar Aghayev (Azerbaijan)
19 November 2024
20:45

Hungary	1–1	Germany
Szoboszlai 90+9' (pen.)	Report	Nmecha 76'

Puskás Aréna, Budapest
Attendance: 53,212
Referee: Duje Strukan (Croatia)

=== Group 4 ===
Pos	Team	Pld	W	D	L	GF	GA	GD	Pts	Qualification or relegation	(Spain)	(Denmark)	(Serbia)	(Switzerland)
1	Spain	6	5	1	0	13	4	+9	16	Advance to quarter-finals	—	1–0	3–0	3–2
2	Denmark	6	2	2	2	7	5	+2	8	Advance to quarter-finals	1–2	—	2–0	2–0
3	Serbia (O)	6	1	3	2	3	6	−3	6	Qualification for relegation play-offs	0–0	0–0	—	2–0
4	Switzerland (R)	6	0	2	4	6	14	−8	2	Relegation to League B	1–4	2–2	1–1	—

Source: UEFA
Rules for classification: Tiebreakers
(O) Play-off winners; (R) Relegated
5 September 2024
20:45

Denmark	2–0	Switzerland
Dorgu 82'; Højbjerg 90+2'	Report

Parken Stadium, Copenhagen
Attendance: 26,024
Referee: Daniel Siebert (Germany)
5 September 2024
20:45

Serbia	0–0	Spain
	Report

Stadion Rajko Mitić, Belgrade
Attendance: 29,981
Referee: Serdar Gözübüyük (Netherlands)

8 September 2024
18:00

Denmark	2–0	Serbia
Grønbæk 36'; Poulsen 61'	Report

Parken Stadium, Copenhagen
Attendance: 34,902
Referee: Chris Kavanagh (England)
8 September 2024
20:45

Switzerland	1–4	Spain
Amdouni 41'	Report	Joselu 4'; Fabián 13', 77'; F. Torres 80'

Stade de Genève, Geneva
Attendance: 26,265
Referee: Irfan Peljto (Bosnia and Herzegovina)

12 October 2024
20:45

Serbia	2–0	Switzerland
Elvedi 45+1' (o.g.); Mitrović 61'	Report

Dubočica Stadium, Leskovac
Attendance: 6,383
Referee: Simone Sozza (Italy)
12 October 2024
20:45

Spain	1–0	Denmark
Zubimendi 79'	Report

Nueva Condomina, Murcia
Attendance: 29,870
Referee: Ivan Kružliak (Slovakia)

15 October 2024
20:45

Spain	3–0	Serbia
Laporte 5'; Morata 65'; Baena 77'	Report

Nuevo Arcángel, Córdoba
Attendance: 20,345
Referee: Daniel Stefanski (Poland)
15 October 2024
20:45

Switzerland	2–2	Denmark
Freuler 26'; Amdouni 45+1' (pen.)	Report	Isaksen 27'; Eriksen 69'

Kybunpark, St. Gallen
Attendance: 16,182
Referee: Halil Umut Meler (Turkey)

15 November 2024
20:45

Denmark	1–2	Spain
Isaksen 84'	Report	Oyarzabal 15'; Pérez 58'

Parken Stadium, Copenhagen
Attendance: 36,985
Referee: Rade Obrenović (Slovenia)
15 November 2024
20:45

Switzerland	1–1	Serbia
Amdouni 78'	Report	Terzić 88'

Stadion Letzigrund, Zurich
Attendance: 21,115
Referee: Clément Turpin (France)

18 November 2024
20:45

Serbia	0–0	Denmark
	Report

Dubočica Stadium, Leskovac
Attendance: 7,295
Referee: Felix Zwayer (Germany)
18 November 2024
20:45 (19:45 UTC+0)

Spain	3–2	Switzerland
Pino 32'; Gil 68'; Zaragoza 90+3' (pen.)	Report	Monteiro 63'; Zeqiri 85' (pen.)

Heliodoro Rodríguez López, Santa Cruz de Tenerife
Attendance: 21,204
Referee: Bastian Dankert (Germany)

== Knockout stage ==
=== Bracket ===
Quarter-finals
Italy	1	3	4
Germany	2	3	5
Denmark	1	2	3
Portugal (a.e.t.)	0	5	5
Netherlands	2	3	5 (4)
Spain (p)	2	3	5 (5)
Croatia	2	0	2 (4)
France (p)	0	2	2 (5)

Semi-finals
4 June – Munich
Germany	1
Portugal	2
5 June – Stuttgart
Spain	5
France	4

Final
8 June – Munich
Portugal (p)	2 (5)
Spain	2 (3)
Third place play-off
8 June – Stuttgart
Germany	0
France	2

=== Quarter-finals ===
The draw for the quarter-finals was held on 22 November 2024, 12:00 CET, at the UEFA headquarters in Nyon, Switzerland, along with the draw for the semi-finals and promotion/relegation play-offs. In the draw, teams from the same group could not be drawn against each other. First, the group runners-up were drawn into a quarter-final pairing (1 to 4), after which group winners were drawn and allocated to the first available quarter-final (in numerical order).

==== Seeding ====
The group winners were seeded in the draw, while the runners-up were unseeded. The Nations League interim overall ranking of November 2024 is shown below in brackets.

Quarter-final draw pots
Group	Winners (seeded in Pot 1)	Runners-up (unseeded in Pot 2)
A1	Portugal (3)	Croatia (8)
A2	France (4)	Italy (5)
A3	Germany (2)	Netherlands (6)
A4	Spain (1)	Denmark (7)

==== Summary ====
The first legs were played on 20 March, and the second legs were played on 23 March 2025.

Team 1	Agg.	Team 2	1st leg	2nd leg
Netherlands	5–5 (4–5 p)	Spain	2–2	3–3 (a.e.t.)
Croatia	2–2 (4–5 p)	France	2–0	0–2 (a.e.t.)
Denmark	3–5	Portugal	1–0	2–5 (a.e.t.)
Italy	4–5	Germany	1–2	3–3

==== Matches ====
Times are CET (UTC+1), as listed by UEFA (local times, if different, are in parentheses).

20 March 2025
20:45

Netherlands	2–2	Spain
Gakpo 28'; Reijnders 46'	Report	Williams 9'; Merino 90+3'

De Kuip, Rotterdam
Attendance: 42,003
Referee: Glenn Nyberg (Sweden)
23 March 2025
20:45

Spain	3–3 (a.e.t.)	Netherlands
Oyarzabal 8' (pen.), 67'; Yamal 103'	Report	Depay 54' (pen.); Maatsen 79'; Simons 109' (pen.)
Penalties
Merino (penalty scored); Torres (penalty scored); García (penalty scored); Yamal (penalty missed); Baena (penalty scored); Pedri (penalty scored)	5–4	(penalty scored) Van Dijk; (penalty scored) Koopmeiners; (penalty scored) Simons; (penalty missed) Lang; (penalty scored) Taylor; (penalty missed) Malen

Mestalla, Valencia
Attendance: 48,082
Referee: Clément Turpin (France)

5–5 on aggregate; Spain won 5–4 on penalties.

20 March 2025
20:45

Croatia	2–0	France
Budimir 26'; Perišić 45+1'	Report

Stadion Poljud, Split
Attendance: 30,551
Referee: Espen Eskås (Norway)
23 March 2025
20:45

France	2–0 (a.e.t.)	Croatia
Olise 52'; Dembélé 80'	Report
Penalties
Mbappé (penalty scored); Tchouaméni (penalty scored); Koundé (penalty missed); Kolo Muani (penalty scored); Hernandez (penalty missed); Doué (penalty scored); Upamecano (penalty scored)	5–4	(penalty missed) Baturina; (penalty scored) Moro; (penalty missed) Ivanović; (penalty scored) Pašalić; (penalty scored) Jakić; (penalty scored) Ćaleta-Car; (penalty missed) Stanišić

Stade de France, Saint-Denis
Attendance: 77,502
Referee: Michael Oliver (England)

2–2 on aggregate; France won 5–4 on penalties.

20 March 2025
20:45

Denmark	1–0	Portugal
Højlund 78'	Report

Parken Stadium, Copenhagen
Attendance: 36,322
Referee: Irfan Peljto (Bosnia and Herzegovina)
23 March 2025
20:45 (19:45 UTC+0)

Portugal	5–2 (a.e.t.)	Denmark
Andersen 38' (o.g.); Ronaldo 72'; Trincão 86', 91'; Ramos 115'	Report	Kristensen 56'; Eriksen 76'

Estádio José Alvalade, Lisbon
Attendance: 47,123
Referee: Slavko Vinčić (Slovenia)

Portugal won 5–3 on aggregate.

20 March 2025
20:45

Italy	1–2	Germany
Tonali 9'	Report	Kleindienst 49'; Goretzka 76'

San Siro, Milan
Attendance: 60,334
Referee: François Letexier (France)
23 March 2025
20:45

Germany	3–3	Italy
Kimmich 30' (pen.); Musiala 36'; Kleindienst 45'	Report	Kean 49', 69'; Raspadori 90+5' (pen.)

Westfalenstadion, Dortmund
Attendance: 64,762
Referee: Szymon Marciniak (Poland)

Germany won 5–4 on aggregate.

=== Nations League Finals ===
UEFA appointed the winner of the quarter-final tie between Italy and Germany, which Germany ultimately won, as the host for the final tournament. The semi-finals pairings were determined by means of an open draw on 22 November 2024, 12:00 CET, at the UEFA headquarters in Nyon, Switzerland, along with the draw for the League A quarter-finals and promotion/relegation play-offs. For scheduling purposes, the host team was allocated to semi-final 1 as the administrative home team.

Times are CEST (UTC+2), as listed by UEFA.

==== Semi-finals ====
4 June 2025
21:10 (Note: The Germany v Portugal match, originally scheduled for 21:00, was delayed by ten minutes due to adverse weather conditions impacting the teams' warm-ups.)

Germany	1–2	Portugal
Wirtz 48'	Report	Conceição 63'; Ronaldo 68'

Allianz Arena, Munich
Attendance: 65,823
Referee: Slavko Vinčić (Slovenia)

5 June 2025
21:00

Spain	5–4	France
Williams 22'; Merino 25'; Yamal 54' (pen.), 67'; Pedri 55'	Report	Mbappé 59' (pen.); Cherki 79'; Vivian 84' (o.g.); Kolo Muani 90+3'

MHPArena, Stuttgart
Attendance: 51,724
Referee: Michael Oliver (England)

==== Third place play-off ====
8 June 2025
15:00

Germany	0–2	France
	Report	Mbappé 45'; Olise 84'

MHPArena, Stuttgart
Attendance: 51,313
Referee: Ivan Kružliak (Slovakia)

==== Final ====
8 June 2025
21:00

Portugal	2–2 (a.e.t.)	Spain
Mendes 26'; Ronaldo 61'	Report	Zubimendi 21'; Oyarzabal 45'
Penalties
Ramos (penalty scored); Vitinha (penalty scored); Fernandes (penalty scored); Mendes (penalty scored); R. Neves (penalty scored)	5–3	(penalty scored) Merino; (penalty scored) Baena; (penalty scored) Isco; (penalty missed) Morata

Munich Football Arena , Munich
Attendance: 65,852
Referee: Sandro Schärer (Switzerland)

== Goalscorers ==
There were 190 goals scored in 60 matches, for an average of 3.17 goals per match.

8 goals

- (Portugal national football team) Cristiano Ronaldo

4 goals

- (France national football team) Randal Kolo Muani
- (Germany national football team) Tim Kleindienst
- (Germany national football team) Florian Wirtz
- (Spain national football team) Mikel Oyarzabal

3 goals

- (Germany national football team) Jamal Musiala
- (Germany national football team) Deniz Undav
- (Hungary national football team) Dominik Szoboszlai
- (Italy national football team) Davide Frattesi
- (Italy national football team) Moise Kean
- (Netherlands national football team) Denzel Dumfries
- (Netherlands national football team) Cody Gakpo
- (Netherlands national football team) Tijjani Reijnders
- (Spain national football team) Lamine Yamal
- (Switzerland national football team) Zeki Amdouni

2 goals

- (Belgium national football team) Kevin De Bruyne
- (Bosnia and Herzegovina national football team) Ermedin Demirović
- (Bosnia and Herzegovina national football team) Edin Džeko
- (Denmark national football team) Christian Eriksen
- (Denmark national football team) Gustav Isaksen
- (France national football team) Bradley Barcola
- (France national football team) Ousmane Dembélé
- (France national football team) Kylian Mbappé
- (France national football team) Michael Olise
- (France national football team) Adrien Rabiot
- (Germany national football team) Kai Havertz
- (Germany national football team) Joshua Kimmich
- (Israel national football team) Mohammad Abu Fani
- (Italy national football team) Andrea Cambiaso
- (Italy national football team) Giovanni Di Lorenzo
- (Italy national football team) Giacomo Raspadori
- (Italy national football team) Mateo Retegui
- (Italy national football team) Sandro Tonali
- (Netherlands national football team) Xavi Simons
- (Netherlands national football team) Wout Weghorst
- (Poland national football team) Sebastian Szymański
- (Poland national football team) Nicola Zalewski
- (Poland national football team) Piotr Zieliński
- (Portugal national football team) Bruno Fernandes
- (Portugal national football team) Francisco Trincão
- (Scotland national football team) John McGinn
- (Scotland national football team) Scott McTominay
- (Spain national football team) Mikel Merino
- (Spain national football team) Fabián Ruiz
- (Spain national football team) Nico Williams
- (Spain national football team) Martín Zubimendi

1 goal

- (Belgium national football team) Maxim De Cuyper
- (Belgium national football team) Loïs Openda
- (Belgium national football team) Youri Tielemans
- (Belgium national football team) Leandro Trossard
- (Croatia national football team) Martin Baturina
- (Croatia national football team) Ante Budimir
- (Croatia national football team) Joško Gvardiol
- (Croatia national football team) Andrej Kramarić
- (Croatia national football team) Igor Matanović
- (Croatia national football team) Luka Modrić
- (Croatia national football team) Ivan Perišić
- (Croatia national football team) Borna Sosa
- (Croatia national football team) Petar Sučić
- (Denmark national football team) Patrick Dorgu
- (Denmark national football team) Albert Grønbæk
- (Denmark national football team) Pierre-Emile Højbjerg
- (Denmark national football team) Rasmus Højlund
- (Denmark national football team) Rasmus Kristensen
- (Denmark national football team) Yussuf Poulsen
- (France national football team) Eduardo Camavinga
- (France national football team) Rayan Cherki
- (France national football team) Mattéo Guendouzi
- (France national football team) Christopher Nkunku
- (Germany national football team) Niclas Füllkrug
- (Germany national football team) Leon Goretzka
- (Germany national football team) Jamie Leweling
- (Germany national football team) Felix Nmecha
- (Germany national football team) Aleksandar Pavlović
- (Germany national football team) Leroy Sané
- (Hungary national football team) Roland Sallai
- (Israel national football team) Omri Gandelman
- (Israel national football team) Yarden Shua
- (Italy national football team) Federico Dimarco
- (Netherlands national football team) Brian Brobbey
- (Netherlands national football team) Memphis Depay
- (Netherlands national football team) Teun Koopmeiners
- (Netherlands national football team) Ian Maatsen
- (Netherlands national football team) Joshua Zirkzee
- (Poland national football team) Robert Lewandowski
- (Poland national football team) Dominik Marczuk
- (Poland national football team) Kamil Piątkowski
- (Portugal national football team) Francisco Conceição
- (Portugal national football team) Diogo Dalot
- (Portugal national football team) João Félix
- (Portugal national football team) Rafael Leão
- (Portugal national football team) Nuno Mendes
- (Portugal national football team) Pedro Neto
- (Portugal national football team) Gonçalo Ramos
- (Portugal national football team) Bernardo Silva
- (Scotland national football team) Ryan Christie
- (Scotland national football team) Billy Gilmour
- (Scotland national football team) Andrew Robertson
- (Serbia national football team) Aleksandar Mitrović
- (Serbia national football team) Aleksa Terzić
- (Spain national football team) Álex Baena
- (Spain national football team) Bryan Gil
- (Spain national football team) Joselu
- (Spain national football team) Aymeric Laporte
- (Spain national football team) Álvaro Morata
- (Spain national football team) Pedri
- (Spain national football team) Ayoze Pérez
- (Spain national football team) Yéremy Pino
- (Spain national football team) Ferran Torres
- (Spain national football team) Bryan Zaragoza
- (Switzerland national football team) Remo Freuler
- (Switzerland national football team) Joël Monteiro
- (Switzerland national football team) Andi Zeqiri

1 own goal

- (Belgium national football team) Timothy Castagne (against Israel)
- (Denmark national football team) Joachim Andersen (against Portugal)
- (Italy national football team) Guglielmo Vicario (against France)
- (Poland national football team) Jan Bednarek (against Portugal)
- (Portugal national football team) Diogo Dalot (against Croatia)
- (Spain national football team) Daniel Vivian (against France)
- (Switzerland national football team) Nico Elvedi (against Serbia)

== Overall ranking ==
Following the league phase, the 16 League A teams were ordered 1st to 16th in an interim overall ranking for the 2024–25 UEFA Nations League according to the following rules:

- The teams finishing first in the groups were ranked 1st to 4th according to the results of the league phase.
- The teams finishing second in the groups were ranked 5th to 8th according to the results of the league phase.
- The teams finishing third in the groups were ranked 9th to 12th according to the results of the league phase.
- The teams finishing fourth in the groups were ranked 13th to 16th according to the results of the league phase.

Rnk	Grp	Team	Pld	W	D	L	GF	GA	GD	Pts
1	A4	Spain	6	5	1	0	13	4	+9	16
2	A3	Germany	6	4	2	0	18	4	+14	14
3	A1	Portugal	6	4	2	0	13	5	+8	14
4	A2	France	6	4	1	1	12	6	+6	13
5	A2	Italy	6	4	1	1	13	8	+5	13
6	A3	Netherlands	6	2	3	1	13	7	+6	9
7	A4	Denmark	6	2	2	2	7	5	+2	8
8	A1	Croatia	6	2	2	2	8	8	0	8
9	A1	Scotland	6	2	1	3	7	8	−1	7
10	A4	Serbia	6	1	3	2	3	6	−3	6
11	A3	Hungary	6	1	3	2	4	11	−7	6
12	A2	Belgium	6	1	1	4	6	9	−3	4
13	A1	Poland	6	1	1	4	9	16	−7	4
14	A2	Israel	6	1	1	4	5	13	−8	4
15	A4	Switzerland	6	0	2	4	6	14	−8	2
16	A3	Bosnia and Herzegovina	6	0	2	4	4	17	−13	2

Source: UEFA
Rules for classification: Ranking criteria

A final overall ranking was also compiled, though this was only used to rank teams within their new leagues for the following edition of the competition.
