= 2024–25 UEFA Nations League promotion/relegation play-offs =

Tournament details
- Dates: League A/B and B/C play-offs: 20–23 March 2025; League C/D play-offs: 26–31 March 2026
- Teams: 20

Tournament statistics
- Matches played: 20
- Goals scored: 53 (2.65 per match)
- Attendance: 449,676 (22,484 per match)
- Top scorer(s): (Georgia (country)) Georges Mikautadze (4 goals)

The 2024–25 UEFA Nations League promotion/relegation play-offs were matches deciding promotion and relegation for some teams in the 2024–25 season of the UEFA Nations League, the fourth season of the international football competition involving the men's national teams of the member associations of UEFA. The play-offs, newly added for this season, determined which of the 20 participating teams would be promoted, relegated or remain in their respective leagues for the 2026–27 season. The play-offs complemented the automatic promotion and relegation already decided during the league phase of the competition.

== Format ==
On 25 January 2023, the UEFA Executive Committee confirmed an altered format for the 2024–25 Nations League, including the addition of the promotion/relegation play-offs. In addition to the automatic promotion and relegation decided by the league phase, the promotion/relegation play-offs determined the final composition of the leagues for the 2026–27 UEFA Nations League. The matches were played home-and-away over two legs. If the team from the higher league was the winner, both teams remained in their respective leagues, whereas if the team from the lower league won, they were promoted to the higher league, with the losers relegated to the lower league.

The match-ups in the promotion/relegation play-offs were as follows:

- The third-placed teams of League A faced the runners-up of League B (four ties in March 2025).
- The third-placed teams of League B faced the runners-up of League C (four ties in March 2025).
- The two best-ranked fourth-placed teams of League C faced the runners-up of League D (two ties in March 2026).

The teams from the higher leagues were seeded, and played the second leg at home. In the two-legged ties, the team that scored more goals on aggregate was the winner. If the aggregate score was level, extra time was played (the away goals rule was not applied). If the score remained level after extra time, a penalty shoot-out was used to decide the winner.

== Qualified teams ==
The following teams qualified for the promotion/relegation play-offs.

League A
Group	Third place
A1	Scotland
A2	Belgium
A3	Hungary
A4	Serbia

League B
Group	Runners-up	Third place
B1	Ukraine	Georgia
B2	Greece	Republic of Ireland
B3	Austria	Slovenia
B4	Turkey	Iceland

League C
Group	Runners-up	Fourth place (best two qualified)
C1	Slovakia	—N/a
C2	Kosovo	—N/a
C3	Bulgaria	Luxembourg
C4	Armenia	Latvia

League D
Group	Runners-up
D1	Gibraltar
D2	Malta

== Draw ==
The draw for the promotion/relegation play-offs was held on 22 November 2024, 12:00 CET, at the UEFA headquarters in Nyon, Switzerland, along with the draw for the League A quarter-finals and semi-finals. In the draw, the teams from the higher leagues were seeded and drawn to host the second leg, while the teams from the lower leagues were unseeded and drawn to host the first leg. First, all teams from the unseeded pot were drawn into pairings in order (from pairing 1–4 for A/B and B/C, and pairing 1–2 for C/D), after which teams from the seeded pot were randomly drawn into the pairings (in numerical order) as their opponents.

No conditions on prohibited clashes applied in the draw. (Note: Due to the league allocation, all but one of the prohibited clashes were not possible (Armenia–Azerbaijan, Gibraltar–Spain, Kosovo–Bosnia and Herzegovina, Kosovo–Serbia). The only possible prohibited clash (Belarus–Ukraine) did not have both teams advance to the promotion/relegation play-offs.)

== Schedule ==
The League A/B and B/C play-off matches were scheduled for 20 and 23 March 2025. To ensure enough teams were available for the March 2025 window of World Cup qualifying, the League C/D play-off matches were scheduled for 26 and 31 March 2026. Had any team participating in the League C/D play-offs qualified for the World Cup qualifying play-offs, then the League C/D play-offs would have been cancelled with the teams remaining in their respective leagues.

The kick-off times were confirmed by UEFA following the draw on 22 November 2024.

Times are CET/CEST, (Note: CET (UTC+1) for the matches in March 2025 and on 26 March 2026, and CEST (UTC+2) for the matches on 31 March 2026.) as listed by UEFA (local times, if different, are in parentheses).

== League A vs League B ==
The League A/B play-offs featured the four third-placed teams of League A against the four second-placed teams of League B.

=== Seeding ===
Pot 1 (seeded)
Team	Rank
Scotland	9
Serbia	10
Hungary	11
Belgium	12

Pot 2 (unseeded)
Team	Rank
Greece	21
Austria	22
Turkey	23
Ukraine	24

=== Summary ===
Team 1	Agg.	Team 2	1st leg	2nd leg
Turkey	6–1	Hungary	3–1	3–0
Ukraine	3–4	Belgium	3–1	0–3
Austria	1–3	Serbia	1–1	0–2
Greece	3–1	Scotland	0–1	3–0

=== Matches ===
20 March 2025
18:00 (20:00 UTC+3)

Turkey	3–1	Hungary
Kökçü 9'; Aktürkoğlu 69'; Kahveci 73'	Report	Schäfer 25'

Rams Park, Istanbul
Attendance: 38,500
Referee: Ivan Kružliak (Slovakia)
23 March 2025
18:00

Hungary	0–3	Turkey
	Report	Çalhanoğlu 37' (pen.); Güler 39'; Bardakcı 90'

Puskás Aréna, Budapest
Attendance: 57,861
Referee: Felix Zwayer (Germany)

Turkey won 6–1 on aggregate and were promoted to League A, while Hungary were relegated to League B.

20 March 2025
20:45

Ukraine	3–1	Belgium
Hutsulyak 66'; Vanat 73'; Zabarnyi 78'	Report	Lukaku 40'

Nueva Condomina, Murcia (Spain) (Note: Due to the Russian invasion of Ukraine, Ukraine were required to play their home matches at neutral venues until further notice.)
Attendance: 8,767
Referee: Sandro Schärer (Switzerland)
23 March 2025
20:45

Belgium	3–0	Ukraine
De Cuyper 70'; Lukaku 75', 86'	Report

Cegeka Arena, Genk
Attendance: 19,446
Referee: Daniel Siebert (Germany)

Belgium won 4–3 on aggregate, and therefore both teams remained in their respective leagues.

20 March 2025
20:45

Austria	1–1	Serbia
Gregoritsch 37'	Report	Samardžić 61'

Ernst-Happel-Stadion, Vienna
Attendance: 46,400
Referee: João Pinheiro (Portugal)
23 March 2025
18:00

Serbia	2–0	Austria
N. Maksimović 56'; Vlahović 90'	Report

Red Star Stadium, Belgrade
Attendance: 22,112
Referee: José María Sánchez Martínez (Spain)

Serbia won 3–1 on aggregate, and therefore both teams remained in their respective leagues.

20 March 2025
20:45 (21:45 UTC+2)

Greece	0–1	Scotland
	Report	McTominay 33' (pen.)

Karaiskakis Stadium, Piraeus
Attendance: 31,483
Referee: Tobias Stieler (Germany)
23 March 2025
18:00 (17:00 UTC+0)

Scotland	0–3	Greece
	Report	Konstantelias 20'; Karetsas 42'; Tzolis 46'

Hampden Park, Glasgow
Attendance: 48,626
Referee: Davide Massa (Italy)

Greece won 3–1 on aggregate and were promoted to League A, while Scotland were relegated to League B.

== League B vs League C ==
The League B/C play-offs featured the four third-placed teams of League B against the four second-placed teams of League C.

=== Seeding ===
Pot 1 (seeded)
Team	Rank
Slovenia	25
Georgia	26
Iceland	27
Republic of Ireland	28

Pot 2 (unseeded)
Team	Rank
Slovakia	37
Kosovo	38
Bulgaria	39
Armenia	40

=== Summary ===
Team 1	Agg.	Team 2	1st leg	2nd leg
Kosovo	5–2	Iceland	2–1	3–1
Bulgaria	2–4	Republic of Ireland	1–2	1–2
Armenia	1–9	Georgia	0–3	1–6
Slovakia	0–1	Slovenia	0–0	0–1 (a.e.t.)

=== Matches ===
20 March 2025
20:45

Kosovo	2–1	Iceland
Dellova 19'; Rexhbeçaj 58'	Report	Óskarsson 22'

Fadil Vokrri Stadium, Pristina
Attendance: 12,857
Referee: Serdar Gözübüyük (Netherlands)
23 March 2025
18:00 (17:00 UTC+0)

Iceland	1–3	Kosovo
Óskarsson 2'	Report	Muriqi 35', 45+3', 79'

Nueva Condomina, Murcia (Spain) (Note: Iceland played their home match at Nueva Condomina, Murcia, Spain, due to construction on Laugardalsvöllur, Reykjavík, the only Icelandic venue which met UEFA requirements.)
Attendance: 1,553
Referee: Jesús Gil Manzano (Spain)

Kosovo won 5–2 on aggregate and were promoted to League B, while Iceland were relegated to League C.

20 March 2025
20:45 (21:45 UTC+2)

Bulgaria	1–2	Republic of Ireland
M. Petkov 6'	Report	Azaz 21'; Doherty 42'

Stadion Hristo Botev, Plovdiv
Attendance: 7,835
Referee: Benoît Bastien (France)
23 March 2025
20:45 (19:45 UTC+0)

Republic of Ireland	2–1	Bulgaria
Ferguson 63'; Idah 84'	Report	Antov 30'

Aviva Stadium, Dublin
Attendance: 40,156
Referee: Halil Umut Meler (Turkey)

Republic of Ireland won 4–2 on aggregate, and therefore both teams remained in their respective leagues.

20 March 2025
18:00 (21:00 UTC+4)

Armenia	0–3	Georgia
	Report	Kochorashvili 32'; Mikautadze 37', 59'

Vazgen Sargsyan Republican Stadium, Yerevan
Attendance: 14,414
Referee: Radu Petrescu (Romania)
23 March 2025
15:00 (18:00 UTC+4)

Georgia	6–1	Armenia
Haroyan 4' (o.g.); Mikautadze 14', 35'; Chakvetadze 23'; Kiteishvili 27'; Kvaratskhelia 62'	Report	Sevikyan 48'

Boris Paichadze Dinamo Arena, Tbilisi
Attendance: 47,903
Referee: Anthony Taylor (England)

Georgia won 9–1 on aggregate, and therefore both teams remained in their respective leagues.

20 March 2025
20:45

Slovakia	0–0	Slovenia
	Report

Tehelné pole, Bratislava
Attendance: 12,545
Referee: Maurizio Mariani (Italy)
23 March 2025
18:00

Slovenia	1–0 (a.e.t.)	Slovakia
Gnezda Čerin 95'	Report

Stožice Stadium, Ljubljana
Attendance: 14,076
Referee: István Kovács (Romania)

Slovenia won 1–0 on aggregate, and therefore both teams remained in their respective leagues.

== League C vs League D ==
The League C/D play-offs featured the two best-ranked fourth-placed teams of League C against the two second-placed teams of League D.

=== Seeding ===
Pot 1 (seeded)
Team	Rank
Latvia	45
Luxembourg	46

Pot 2 (unseeded)
Team	Rank
Malta	51
Gibraltar	52

=== Summary ===
Team 1	Agg.	Team 2	1st leg	2nd leg
Gibraltar	0–2	Latvia	0–1	0–1
Malta	0–5	Luxembourg	0–2	0–3

=== Matches ===
26 March 2026
18:00

Gibraltar	0–1	Latvia
	Report	Gutkovskis 64' (pen.)

Europa Sports Park, Gibraltar
Attendance: 1,442
Referee: Ivan Kružliak (Slovakia)
31 March 2026
18:00 (19:00 UTC+3)

Latvia	1–0	Gibraltar
Černomordijs 90+3'	Report

Skonto Stadium, Riga
Attendance: 5,120
Referee: Sandro Schärer (Switzerland)

Latvia won 2–0 on aggregate, and therefore both teams remained in their respective leagues.

26 March 2026
18:00

Malta	0–2	Luxembourg
	Report	V. Thill 47'; Olesen 90+3'

National Stadium, Ta' Qali
Attendance: 9,467
Referee: Irfan Peljto (Bosnia and Herzegovina)
31 March 2026
18:00

Luxembourg	3–0	Malta
V. Thill 20'; Sinani 50'; Moreira 70'	Report

Stade de Luxembourg, Luxembourg
Attendance: 9,113
Referee: Daniel Siebert (Germany)

Luxembourg won 5–0 on aggregate, and therefore both teams remained in their respective leagues.

== Goalscorers ==
There were 53 goals scored in 20 matches, for an average of 2.65 goals per match.

4 goals

- (Georgia national football team) Georges Mikautadze

3 goals

- (Belgium national football team) Romelu Lukaku
- (Kosovo national football team) Vedat Muriqi

2 goals

- (Iceland national football team) Orri Óskarsson
- (Luxembourg national football team) Vincent Thill

1 goal

- (Armenia national football team) Edgar Sevikyan
- (Austria national football team) Michael Gregoritsch
- (Belgium national football team) Maxim De Cuyper
- (Bulgaria national football team) Valentin Antov
- (Bulgaria national football team) Marin Petkov
- (Georgia national football team) Giorgi Chakvetadze
- (Georgia national football team) Otar Kiteishvili
- (Georgia national football team) Giorgi Kochorashvili
- (Georgia national football team) Khvicha Kvaratskhelia
- (Greece national football team) Konstantinos Karetsas
- (Greece national football team) Giannis Konstantelias
- (Greece national football team) Christos Tzolis
- (Hungary national football team) András Schäfer
- (Kosovo national football team) Lumbardh Dellova
- (Kosovo national football team) Elvis Rexhbeçaj
- (Latvia national football team) Antonijs Černomordijs
- (Latvia national football team) Vladislavs Gutkovskis
- (Luxembourg national football team) Tomás Moreira
- (Luxembourg national football team) Mathias Olesen
- (Luxembourg national football team) Danel Sinani
- (Republic of Ireland national football team) Finn Azaz
- (Republic of Ireland national football team) Matt Doherty
- (Republic of Ireland national football team) Evan Ferguson
- (Republic of Ireland national football team) Adam Idah
- (Scotland national football team) Scott McTominay
- (Serbia national football team) Nemanja Maksimović
- (Serbia national football team) Lazar Samardžić
- (Serbia national football team) Dušan Vlahović
- (Slovenia national football team) Adam Gnezda Čerin
- (Turkey national football team) Kerem Aktürkoğlu
- (Turkey national football team) Abdülkerim Bardakcı
- (Turkey national football team) Hakan Çalhanoğlu
- (Turkey national football team) Arda Güler
- (Turkey national football team) İrfan Kahveci
- (Turkey national football team) Orkun Kökçü
- (Ukraine national football team) Oleksiy Hutsulyak
- (Ukraine national football team) Vladyslav Vanat
- (Ukraine national football team) Illya Zabarnyi

1 own goal

- (Armenia national football team) Varazdat Haroyan (against Georgia)
