= 2028–29 UEFA Nations League =

Tournament details
- Dates: League phase: September – November 2028; League A quarter-finals and promotion/relegation play-offs: March 2029; Nations League Finals: June 2029
- Teams: Up to 55

The 2028–29 UEFA Nations League will be the sixth season of the UEFA Nations League, an international association football competition involving the men's national teams of the member associations of UEFA. The competition will be held from September to November 2028 (league phase), March 2029 (League A quarter-finals and promotion/relegation play-offs) and June 2029 (Nations League Finals).

== Format ==
Following a change in format, the UEFA Nations League will move from four to three leagues. The three leagues will feature 18 teams each, divided into three groups of six teams. The teams will be allocated to leagues and seeded in the draw based on the 2026–27 UEFA Nations League final overall ranking. The draw will feature three pots of six teams for each league, with each group containing two teams from each pot. Each team will play six matches within their group, with two matches (home and away) against the team from their same pot, and one match against four other teams in their group. Therefore, each team will play one home match and one away match against a team from each pot. The leagues phase will be played from September to November 2028.

In the top division, League A, the group winners, runners-up and two-best third-placed teams will advance to the quarter-finals, played home-and-away over two legs in March 2029. The four quarter-final winners will qualify for the Nations League Finals, which is played in a knockout format, consisting of the semi-finals, third place play-off and final. The semi-final pairings, along with the administrative home teams for the third place play-off and final, are determined by means of a draw. The host country will be selected, preferably from among the four qualified teams, by the UEFA Executive Committee, with the winners of the final crowned as the Nations League champions.

Teams also compete for promotion and relegation to a higher or lower league. The group winners in Leagues B and C are directly promoted, while the last-placed teams of each group in Leagues A and B are directly relegated. The competition will also feature promotion/relegation play-offs following the league phase, with the fourth- and fifth-placed teams of League A facing the second- and third-placed teams of League B, and the fourth- and fifth-placed teams of League B facing the second- and third-placed teams of League C. The matches will be played home-and-away over two legs in March 2029, with the winners going to the higher league and the losers entering the lower league.

In all two-legged ties, the higher-ranked teams host the second leg. The team that scores more goals on aggregate is the winner. If the aggregate score is level, extra time is played (the away goals rule is not applied). If the score remains level after extra time, a penalty shoot-out is used to decide the winner.

=== 2030 FIFA World Cup qualification ===
The 2028–29 UEFA Nations League will determine the composition for the two leagues of the 2030 World Cup qualifiers, which will utilise a new format. Based on the final standings of the Nations League — after all promotions and relegations are determined — teams finishing in Leagues A and B will enter League 1 for World Cup qualifying, while teams finishing in League C will enter League 2. The European co-hosts of the 2030 FIFA World Cup, Spain and Portugal, automatically qualified but will also participate in the qualifiers. The format is subject to final confirmation by UEFA and FIFA.

== Schedule ==
Below is the schedule of the 2028–29 UEFA Nations League.

Stage	Round	FIFA window
League phase	Matchday 1	18 September – 3 October 2028
League phase	Matchday 2	18 September – 3 October 2028
League phase	Matchday 3	18 September – 3 October 2028
League phase	Matchday 4	18 September – 3 October 2028
League phase	Matchday 5	13–21 November 2028
League phase	Matchday 6	13–21 November 2028
League A quarter-finals and promotion/relegation play-offs	First leg	19–27 March 2029
League A quarter-finals and promotion/relegation play-offs	Second leg	19–27 March 2029
Finals	Semi-finals	4–12 June 2029
Finals	Third place play-off	4–12 June 2029
Finals	Final	4–12 June 2029

== Teams ==
All 55 UEFA national teams are able to submit an entry into the competition. However, Russia were suspended indefinitely on 28 February 2022 from participating in UEFA and FIFA competitions due to their country's invasion of Ukraine. Therefore, it is unclear whether they will compete in the Nations League.

The two worst-ranked fourth-placed teams in League A from the 2026–27 season moved down a league, while the group winners of Leagues B and C, as well as all teams in League D (due to the format change), moved up. Additionally, the winners of the promotion/relegation play-off ties will enter into the higher respective league, while the losers will play in the lower league. The remaining teams will stay in their respective leagues.

League A

- Austria
- Belgium
- England
- France
- Germany
- Greece
- Italy
- Netherlands
- Northern Ireland
- Norway
- Portugal
- Spain
- Sweden
- Switzerland

League A or B

- Bosnia and Herzegovina
- Croatia
- Denmark
- Hungary
- Republic of Ireland
- Serbia
- Slovenia
- Wales

League B

- Albania
- Czech Republic
- Iceland
- Kosovo
- Montenegro
- Poland
- Scotland
- Slovakia
- Turkey
- Ukraine

League B or C

- Belarus
- Cyprus
- Estonia
- Faroe Islands
- Georgia
- Israel
- North Macedonia
- Romania

League C

- Andorra
- Armenia
- Azerbaijan
- Bulgaria
- Finland
- Gibraltar
- Kazakhstan
- Latvia
- Liechtenstein
- Lithuania
- Luxembourg
- Malta
- Moldova
- San Marino

Not a member of a league

- Russia (suspended)

== League A ==
=== Group A1 ===
Pos	Team	Pld	W	D	L	GF	GA	GD	Pts	Qualification or relegation
1	A1-1	0	0	0	0	0	0	0	0	Advance to quarter-finals
1	A1-2	0	0	0	0	0	0	0	0	Advance to quarter-finals
1	A1-3	0	0	0	0	0	0	0	0	Possibly advance to quarter-finals
1	A1-4	0	0	0	0	0	0	0	0	Qualification for relegation play-offs
1	A1-5	0	0	0	0	0	0	0	0	Qualification for relegation play-offs
1	A1-6	0	0	0	0	0	0	0	0	Relegation to League B

First match(es) will be played: September 2028. Source: UEFA

=== Group A2 ===
Pos	Team	Pld	W	D	L	GF	GA	GD	Pts	Qualification or relegation
1	A2-1	0	0	0	0	0	0	0	0	Advance to quarter-finals
1	A2-2	0	0	0	0	0	0	0	0	Advance to quarter-finals
1	A2-3	0	0	0	0	0	0	0	0	Possibly advance to quarter-finals
1	A2-4	0	0	0	0	0	0	0	0	Qualification for relegation play-offs
1	A2-5	0	0	0	0	0	0	0	0	Qualification for relegation play-offs
1	A2-6	0	0	0	0	0	0	0	0	Relegation to League B

First match(es) will be played: September 2028. Source: UEFA

=== Group A3 ===
Pos	Team	Pld	W	D	L	GF	GA	GD	Pts	Qualification or relegation
1	A3-1	0	0	0	0	0	0	0	0	Advance to quarter-finals
1	A3-2	0	0	0	0	0	0	0	0	Advance to quarter-finals
1	A3-3	0	0	0	0	0	0	0	0	Possibly advance to quarter-finals
1	A3-4	0	0	0	0	0	0	0	0	Qualification for relegation play-offs
1	A3-5	0	0	0	0	0	0	0	0	Qualification for relegation play-offs
1	A3-6	0	0	0	0	0	0	0	0	Relegation to League B

First match(es) will be played: September 2028. Source: UEFA

=== Ranking of third-placed teams ===
Pos	Grp	Team	Pld	W	D	L	GF	GA	GD	Pts	Qualification
1	A1	3rd place Group A1	0	0	0	0	0	0	0	0	Advance to quarter-finals
2	A2	3rd place Group A2	0	0	0	0	0	0	0	0	Advance to quarter-finals
3	A3	3rd place Group A3	0	0	0	0	0	0	0	0	

First match(es) will be played: September 2028. Source: UEFA

=== Knockout stage ===
==== Bracket ====
Quarter-finals
Unseeded team
Seeded team
Unseeded team
Seeded team
Unseeded team
Seeded team
Unseeded team
Seeded team

Semi-finals
June – TBC
Winner quarter-final (host)
Winner quarter-final
June – TBC
Winner quarter-final
Winner quarter-final

Final
June – TBC
Winner UNLF Match 1
Winner UNLF Match 2
Third place play-off
June – TBC
Loser UNLF Match 1
Loser UNLF Match 2

==== Quarter-finals ====
The draw for the quarter-finals will be held after the completion of the league phase. In the draw, teams from the same group cannot be drawn against each other. The first and second legs will be played between 19–27 March 2029.

Team 1	Agg.	Team 2	1st leg	2nd leg
Unseeded team	1	Seeded team	19–27 Mar	19–27 Mar
Unseeded team	2	Seeded team	19–27 Mar	19–27 Mar
Unseeded team	3	Seeded team	19–27 Mar	19–27 Mar
Unseeded team	4	Seeded team	19–27 Mar	19–27 Mar

==== Nations League Finals ====
The host of the Nations League Finals will preferably be selected from the four qualified teams. The semi-finals pairings will be determined by means of an open draw. For scheduling purposes, the host team will be allocated to semi-final 1 as the administrative home team.

===== Semi-finals =====
4–12 June 2029

Winner quarter-final (host)	Match 1	Winner quarter-final

4–12 June 2029

Winner quarter-final	Match 2	Winner quarter-final

===== Third place play-off =====
4–12 June 2029

Loser Match 1	Match 3	Loser Match 2

===== Final =====
4–12 June 2029

Winner Match 1	Match 4	Winner Match 2

== League B ==
=== Group B1 ===
Pos	Team	Pld	W	D	L	GF	GA	GD	Pts	Promotion, qualification or relegation
1	B1-1	0	0	0	0	0	0	0	0	Promotion to League A
1	B1-2	0	0	0	0	0	0	0	0	Qualification for promotion play-offs
1	B1-3	0	0	0	0	0	0	0	0	Qualification for promotion play-offs
1	B1-4	0	0	0	0	0	0	0	0	Qualification for relegation play-offs
1	B1-5	0	0	0	0	0	0	0	0	Qualification for relegation play-offs
1	B1-6	0	0	0	0	0	0	0	0	Relegation to League C

First match(es) will be played: September 2028. Source: UEFA

=== Group B2 ===
Pos	Team	Pld	W	D	L	GF	GA	GD	Pts	Promotion, qualification or relegation
1	B2-1	0	0	0	0	0	0	0	0	Promotion to League A
1	B2-2	0	0	0	0	0	0	0	0	Qualification for promotion play-offs
1	B2-3	0	0	0	0	0	0	0	0	Qualification for promotion play-offs
1	B2-4	0	0	0	0	0	0	0	0	Qualification for relegation play-offs
1	B2-5	0	0	0	0	0	0	0	0	Qualification for relegation play-offs
1	B2-6	0	0	0	0	0	0	0	0	Relegation to League C

First match(es) will be played: September 2028. Source: UEFA

=== Group B3 ===
Pos	Team	Pld	W	D	L	GF	GA	GD	Pts	Promotion, qualification or relegation
1	B3-1	0	0	0	0	0	0	0	0	Promotion to League A
1	B3-2	0	0	0	0	0	0	0	0	Qualification for promotion play-offs
1	B3-3	0	0	0	0	0	0	0	0	Qualification for promotion play-offs
1	B3-4	0	0	0	0	0	0	0	0	Qualification for relegation play-offs
1	B3-5	0	0	0	0	0	0	0	0	Qualification for relegation play-offs
1	B3-6	0	0	0	0	0	0	0	0	Relegation to League C

First match(es) will be played: September 2028. Source: UEFA

== League C ==
=== Group C1 ===
Pos	Team	Pld	W	D	L	GF	GA	GD	Pts	Promotion or qualification
1	C1-1	0	0	0	0	0	0	0	0	Promotion to League B
1	C1-2	0	0	0	0	0	0	0	0	Qualification for promotion play-offs
1	C1-3	0	0	0	0	0	0	0	0	Qualification for promotion play-offs
1	C1-4	0	0	0	0	0	0	0	0	
1	C1-5	0	0	0	0	0	0	0	0	
1	C1-6	0	0	0	0	0	0	0	0	

First match(es) will be played: September 2028. Source: UEFA

=== Group C2 ===
Pos	Team	Pld	W	D	L	GF	GA	GD	Pts	Promotion or qualification
1	C2-1	0	0	0	0	0	0	0	0	Promotion to League B
1	C2-2	0	0	0	0	0	0	0	0	Qualification for promotion play-offs
1	C2-3	0	0	0	0	0	0	0	0	Qualification for promotion play-offs
1	C2-4	0	0	0	0	0	0	0	0	
1	C2-5	0	0	0	0	0	0	0	0	
1	C2-6	0	0	0	0	0	0	0	0	

First match(es) will be played: September 2028. Source: UEFA

=== Group C3 ===
Pos	Team	Pld	W	D	L	GF	GA	GD	Pts	Promotion or qualification
1	C3-1	0	0	0	0	0	0	0	0	Promotion to League B
1	C3-2	0	0	0	0	0	0	0	0	Qualification for promotion play-offs
1	C3-3	0	0	0	0	0	0	0	0	Qualification for promotion play-offs
1	C3-4	0	0	0	0	0	0	0	0	
1	C3-5	0	0	0	0	0	0	0	0	
1	C3-6	0	0	0	0	0	0	0	0	

First match(es) will be played: September 2028. Source: UEFA

== Promotion/relegation play-offs ==
The draw for the promotion/relegation play-offs will be held following the completion of the league phase. The first and second legs will be played between 19–27 March 2029.

=== League A vs League B ===
Team 1	Agg.	Team 2	1st leg	2nd leg
League B second place	1	League A fifth place	19–27 Mar	19–27 Mar
League B second place	2	League A fifth place	19–27 Mar	19–27 Mar
League B second place	3	League A fifth place	19–27 Mar	19–27 Mar
League B third place	4	League A fourth place	19–27 Mar	19–27 Mar
League B third place	5	League A fourth place	19–27 Mar	19–27 Mar
League B third place	6	League A fourth place	19–27 Mar	19–27 Mar

=== League B vs League C ===
Team 1	Agg.	Team 2	1st leg	2nd leg
League C second place	1	League B fifth place	19–27 Mar	19–27 Mar
League C second place	2	League B fifth place	19–27 Mar	19–27 Mar
League C second place	3	League B fifth place	19–27 Mar	19–27 Mar
League C third place	4	League B fourth place	19–27 Mar	19–27 Mar
League C third place	5	League B fourth place	19–27 Mar	19–27 Mar
League C third place	6	League B fourth place	19–27 Mar	19–27 Mar
