= Faroe Islands national football team results (1988–2019) =

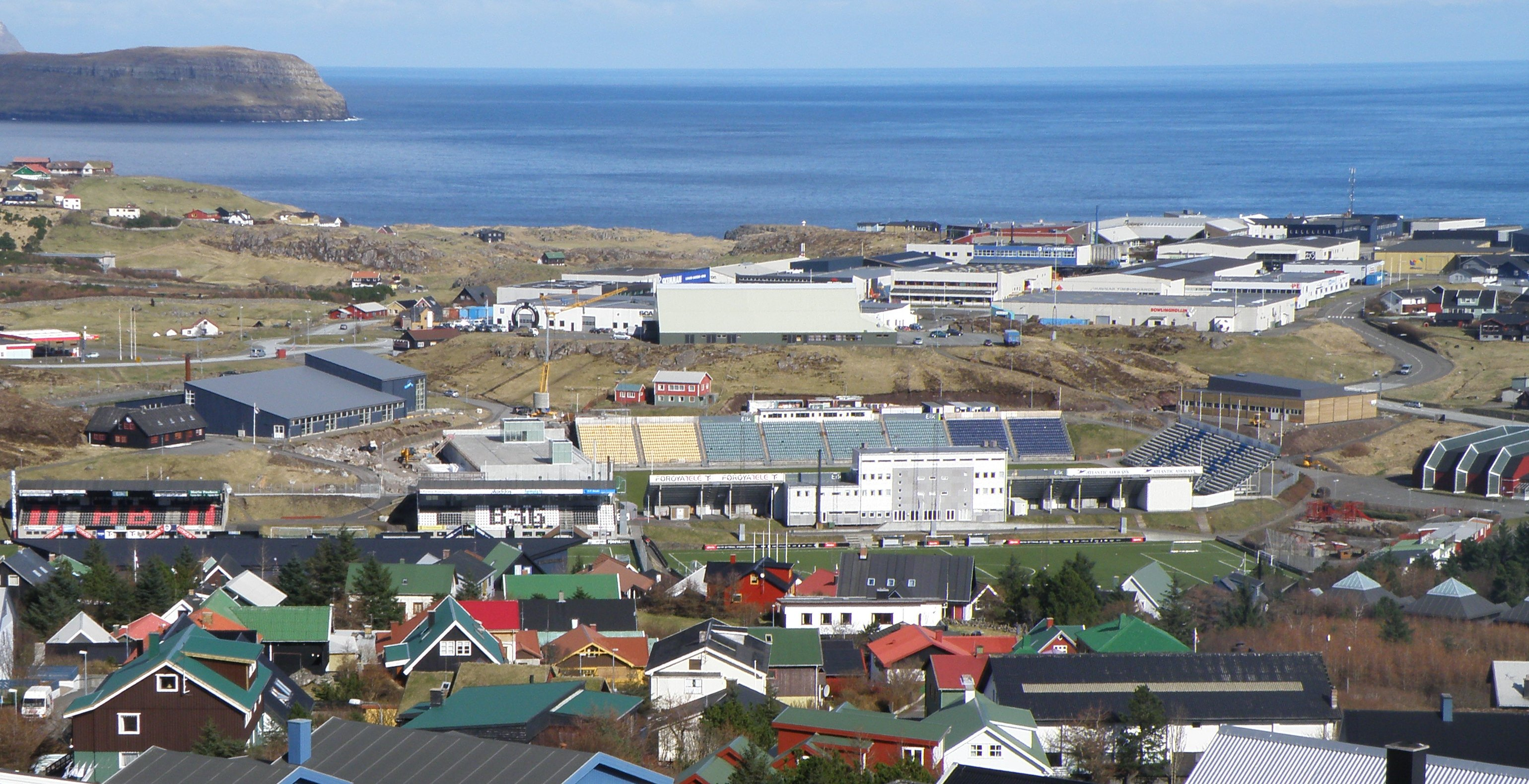
Tórsvøllur in Tórshavn is one of two stadiums used by the Faroe Islands to host matches. The other is Svangaskarð in Toftir.

The Faroe Islands national football team represents the Faroe Islands in association football and is controlled by the Faroe Islands Football Association (FSF), the governing body of the sport in the country. It competes as a member of the Union of European Football Associations (UEFA), which encompasses the countries of Europe. Organised football has been played in the country since the 19th century; Tvøroyrar Bóltfelag was its first club, founded in 1892. Initially, clubs played friendlies to determine the winner of an unofficial championship, with matches being contested home and away, depending on the weather and the state of the generally uneven grass pitches. The Faroe Islands Sports Association was formed in 1939, and three years later a national league was created. Cup competitions were introduced in 1955 before the FSF was founded on 13 January 1979.

Before joining the International Federation of Association Football (FIFA) on 2 July 1988, the Faroe Islands played a selection of unofficial friendlies; they played their first official match on 24 August 1988 against Iceland which resulted in a 1–0 away defeat in Akranes, Iceland. The nation recorded its first victory in its next friendly, 1–0 against Canada. On 18 April 1990, the Faroe Islands became a member of UEFA and entered its first major international competition later that year: the qualifying rounds for the 1992 UEFA European Football Championship. The team won their first competitive match on 12 September 1990 when they defeated Austria 1–0; this match, along with all competitive home matches during the qualification tournament, was played in Sweden because there were no grass pitches in the Faroe Islands to meet UEFA standards at the time. The Faroe Islands made its first appearance in the qualifying rounds of the FIFA World Cup during the 1994 edition, but the country has yet to reach the finals of either competition.

Between 1988 and 2019, the team's largest victories came by three-goal margins against San Marino, Gibraltar and Liechtenstein in 1995, 2014 and 2018 respectively; also during this period, the Faroe Islands' largest defeats came by seven-goal margins against Romania, Norway, Yugoslavia and FR Yugoslavia. The Faroe Islands' highest annual FIFA Men's World ranking during this period was 83rd at the end of 2016.

== Results ==
Key

- H = Home ground
- A = Away ground
- N = Neutral ground
- (X) = Goals scored
- (o.g.) = Own goal
- No. = Match number
- Att. = Attendance
- The Faroe Islands score is shown first in each case

Faroe Islands official national football team results
No.	Date	Venue	Opponents	Score	Competition	Faroe Islands scorers	Att.	Ref.
1	24 August 1988	Akranesvöllur, Akranes (A)	Iceland	0–1	Friendly	—	1,000	
2	14 April 1989	Gundadalur, Tórshavn (H)	Canada	1–0	Friendly	Nielsen	3,200	
3	16 April 1989	Við Djúpumýrar, Klaksvík (H)	Canada	0–1	Friendly	—	2,000	
4	8 August 1990	Gundadalur, Tórshavn (H)	Iceland	2–3	Friendly	K. Mørkøre, Dam	4,000	
5	12 September 1990	Idrottsparken, Landskrona (N)	Austria	1–0	UEFA Euro 1992 qualifying	Nielsen	1,265	
6	10 October 1990	Københavns Idrætspark, Copenhagen (A)	Denmark	1–4	UEFA Euro 1992 qualifying	A. Mørkøre	38,563	
7	1 May 1991	Windsor Park, Belfast (A)	Northern Ireland	1–1	UEFA Euro 1992 qualifying	Reynheim	7,253	
8	16 May 1991	Stadion Crvena Zvezda, Belgrade (A)	Yugoslavia	0–7	UEFA Euro 1992 qualifying	—	6,745	
9	22 May 1991	Stadion Lehen, Salzburg (A)	Austria	0–3	UEFA Euro 1992 qualifying	—	11,757	
10	15 July 1991	Gundadalur, Tórshavn (H)	Turkey	1–1	Friendly	Jónsson	5,500	
11	11 September 1991	Idrottsparken, Landskrona (N)	Northern Ireland	0–5	UEFA Euro 1992 qualifying	—	1,623	
12	25 September 1991	Idrottsparken, Landskrona (N)	Denmark	0–4	UEFA Euro 1992 qualifying	—	2,589	
13	16 October 1991	Idrottsparken, Landskrona (N)	Yugoslavia	0–2	UEFA Euro 1992 qualifying	—	2,485	
14	6 May 1992	Stadionul Steaua, Bucharest (A)	Romania	0–7	1994 FIFA World Cup qualifying	—	10,000	
15	13 May 1992	Ullevaal Stadion, Oslo (A)	Norway	0–2	Friendly	—	4,165	
16	3 June 1992	Svangaskarð, Toftir (H)	Belgium	0–3	1994 FIFA World Cup qualifying	—	5,156	
17	16 June 1992	Svangaskarð, Toftir (H)	Cyprus	0–2	1994 FIFA World Cup qualifying	—	4,129	
18	5 August 1992	Svangaskarð, Toftir (H)	Israel	1–1	Friendly	Reynheim	400	
19	9 September 1992	Cardiff Arms Park, Cardiff (A)	Wales	0–6	1994 FIFA World Cup qualifying	—	7,000	
20	23 September 1992	Všešportový areál, Košice (A)	Czechoslovakia	0–4	1994 FIFA World Cup qualifying	—	17,000	
21	25 April 1993	Tsirion Stadium, Limassol (A)	Cyprus	1–3	1994 FIFA World Cup qualifying	Arge	4,000	
22	22 May 1993	Constant Vanden Stock Stadium, Brussels (A)	Belgium	0–3	1994 FIFA World Cup qualifying	—	20,641	
23	6 June 1993	Svangaskarð, Toftir (H)	Wales	0–3	1994 FIFA World Cup qualifying	—	4,209	
24	16 June 1993	Svangaskarð, Toftir (H)	RCS (Note: Following the dissolution of Czechoslovakia, the national team was known as the Representation of Czechs and Slovaks (RCS) for a short period where they completed their FIFA World Cup qualification group.)	0–3	1994 FIFA World Cup qualifying	—	1,000	
25	11 August 1993	Svangaskarð, Toftir (H)	Norway	0–7	Friendly	—	800	
26	8 September 1993	Svangaskarð, Toftir (H)	Romania	0–4	1994 FIFA World Cup qualifying	—	2,724	
27	7 September 1994	Svangaskarð, Toftir (H)	Greece	1–5	UEFA Euro 1996 qualifying	Apostolakis (o.g.)	2,412	
28	12 October 1994	Hampden Park, Glasgow (A)	Scotland	1–5	UEFA Euro 1996 qualifying	Müller	20,885	
29	16 November 1994	Helsinki Olympic Stadium, Helsinki (A)	Finland	0–5	UEFA Euro 1996 qualifying	—	2,420	
30	26 April 1995	Svangaskarð, Toftir (H)	Finland	0–4	UEFA Euro 1996 qualifying	—	1,338	
31	6 May 1995	Luzhniki Stadium, Moscow (A)	Russia	0–3	UEFA Euro 1996 qualifying	—	5,024	
32	25 May 1995	Svangaskarð, Toftir (H)	San Marino	3–0	UEFA Euro 1996 qualifying	J. Hansen, Rasmussen, Johnsson	3,450	
33	7 June 1995	Svangaskarð, Toftir (H)	Scotland	0–2	UEFA Euro 1996 qualifying	—	3,881	
34	2 July 1995	Norðfjarðarvöllur, Neskaupstaður (A)	Iceland	0–2	Friendly	—	1,000	
35	6 September 1995	Svangaskarð, Toftir (H)	Russia	2–5	UEFA Euro 1996 qualifying	Jarnskor, Jónsson	1,792	
36	11 October 1995	Stadio Olimpico, Serravalle (A)	San Marino	3–1	UEFA Euro 1996 qualifying	Jónsson (3)	928	
37	15 November 1995	Theodoros Vardinogiannis Stadium, Heraklion (A)	Greece	0–5	UEFA Euro 1996 qualifying	—	9,088	
38	24 February 1996	Municipal Stadium, Pyla (N)	Estonia	2–2	Friendly	Johannesen, Jarnskor	50	
39	27 February 1996	Antonis Papadopoulos Stadium, Larnaca (N)	Azerbaijan	0–3	Friendly	—	50	
40	24 April 1996	Stadion Crvena Zvezda, Belgrade (A)	FR Yugoslavia	1–3	1998 FIFA World Cup qualifying	Petersen	16,325	
41	31 August 1996	Svangaskarð, Toftir (H)	Slovakia	1–2	1998 FIFA World Cup qualifying	Müller	1,445	
42	4 September 1996	Svangaskarð, Toftir (H)	Spain	2–6	1998 FIFA World Cup qualifying	Jónsson, Arge	4,200	
43	6 October 1996	Svangaskarð, Toftir (H)	FR Yugoslavia	1–8	1998 FIFA World Cup qualifying	Müller	1,017	
44	23 October 1996	Tehelné pole, Bratislava (A)	Slovakia	0–3	1998 FIFA World Cup qualifying	—	5,442	
45	30 April 1997	Ta' Qali National Stadium, Ta' Qali (A)	Malta	2–1	1998 FIFA World Cup qualifying	Ø. Hansen, Jónsson	8,188	
46	8 June 1997	Svangaskarð, Toftir (H)	Malta	2–1	1998 FIFA World Cup qualifying	Arge, Jónsson	6,400	
47	27 July 1997	Sindravellir, Höfn (A)	Iceland	0–1	Friendly	—	700	
48	6 August 1997	Tamme Stadium, Tartu (A)	Estonia	2–0	Friendly	Rasmussen, Müller	1,000	
49	20 August 1997	Na Stínadlech, Teplice (A)	Czech Republic	0–2	1998 FIFA World Cup qualifying	—	8,332	
50	6 September 1997	Svangaskarð, Toftir (H)	Czech Republic	0–2	1998 FIFA World Cup qualifying	—	2,700	
51	11 October 1997	El Molinón, Gijón (A)	Spain	1–3	1998 FIFA World Cup qualifying	J. Hansen	10,000	
52	4 June 1998	Kadrioru Stadium, Tallinn (A)	Estonia	0–5	UEFA Euro 2000 qualifying	—	1,500	
53	19 August 1998	Koševo City Stadium, Sarajevo (A)	Bosnia and Herzegovina	0–1	UEFA Euro 2000 qualifying	—	28,000	
54	6 September 1998	Svangaskarð, Toftir (H)	Czech Republic	0–1	UEFA Euro 2000 qualifying	—	2,589	
55	10 October 1998	Žalgiris Stadium, Vilnius (A)	Lithuania	0–0	UEFA Euro 2000 qualifying	—	800	
56	14 October 1998	Pittodrie Stadium, Aberdeen (A)	Scotland	1–2	UEFA Euro 2000 qualifying	Petersen	18,517	
57	3 February 1999	Estadio Bahía Sur, San Fernando (N)	Andorra	0–0	Friendly	—	75	
58	5 June 1999	Svangaskarð, Toftir (H)	Scotland	1–1	UEFA Euro 2000 qualifying	H. Hansen	4,101	
59	9 June 1999	Svangaskarð, Toftir (H)	Bosnia and Herzegovina	2–2	UEFA Euro 2000 qualifying	Arge (2)	4,800	
60	18 August 1999	Tórsvøllur, Tórshavn (H)	Iceland	0–1	Friendly	—	3,511	
61	4 September 1999	Tórsvøllur, Tórshavn (H)	Estonia	0–2	UEFA Euro 2000 qualifying	—	2,300	
62	8 September 1999	Tórsvøllur, Tórshavn (H)	Lithuania	0–1	UEFA Euro 2000 qualifying	—	680	
63	9 October 1999	Letná Stadium, Prague (A)	Czech Republic	0–2	UEFA Euro 2000 qualifying	—	21,362	
64	31 January 2000	La Manga Stadium, La Manga (N)	Finland	0–1	2000–01 Nordic Championship	—	102	
65	4 February 2000	La Manga Stadium, La Manga (N)	Iceland	2–3	2000–01 Nordic Championship	K. Mørkøre, Jónsson	57	
66	26 April 2000	Rheinpark Stadion, Vaduz (A)	Liechtenstein	1–0	Friendly	Arge	950	
67	16 August 2000	Tórsvøllur, Tórshavn (H)	Denmark	0–2	2000–01 Nordic Championship	—	6,478	
68	3 September 2000	Svangaskarð, Toftir (H)	Slovenia	2–2	2002 FIFA World Cup qualifying	Arge, Ø. Hansen	3,200	
69	7 October 2000	Hardturm, Zurich (A)	Switzerland	1–5	2002 FIFA World Cup qualifying	Petersen	9,500	
70	31 January 2001	Tipshallen, Växjö (A)	Sweden	0–0	2000–01 Nordic Championship	—	2,204	
71	24 March 2001	Stade Josy Barthel, Luxembourg City (A)	Luxembourg	2–0	2002 FIFA World Cup qualifying	C. Jacobsen, K. Mørkøre	2,380	
72	28 March 2001	Luzhniki Stadium, Moscow (A)	Russia	0–1	2002 FIFA World Cup qualifying	—	8,000	
73	2 June 2001	Svangaskarð, Toftir (H)	Switzerland	0–1	2002 FIFA World Cup qualifying	—	4,000	
74	6 June 2001	Svangaskarð, Toftir (H)	FR Yugoslavia	0–6	2002 FIFA World Cup qualifying	—	4,150	
75	15 August 2001	Stadion Crvena Zvezda, Belgrade (A)	FR Yugoslavia	0–2	2002 FIFA World Cup qualifying	—	15,437	
76	1 September 2001	Svangaskarð, Toftir (H)	Luxembourg	1–0	2002 FIFA World Cup qualifying	J. Hansen	1,464	
77	5 September 2001	Tórsvøllur, Tórshavn (H)	Russia	0–3	2002 FIFA World Cup qualifying	—	2,936	
78	6 October 2001	Bežigrad Stadium, Ljubljana (A)	Slovenia	0–3	2002 FIFA World Cup qualifying	—	8,500	
79	10 February 2002	Tsirion Stadium, Limassol (N)	Poland	1–2	Friendly	R. Jacobsen	50	
80	13 February 2002	Peyia Municipal Stadium, Peyia (N)	Liechtenstein	1–0	Friendly	Arge	50	
81	21 August 2002	Tórsvøllur, Tórshavn (H)	Liechtenstein	3–1	Friendly	C. Jacobsen, Benjaminsen, Johnsson	3,200	
82	7 September 2002	Svangaskarð, Toftir (H)	Scotland	2–2	UEFA Euro 2004 qualifying	Petersen (2)	4,200	
83	12 October 2002	Darius and Girėnas Stadium, Kaunas (A)	Lithuania	0–2	UEFA Euro 2004 qualifying	—	2,500	
84	16 October 2002	Niedersachsenstadion, Hanover (A)	Germany	1–2	UEFA Euro 2004 qualifying	Friedrich (o.g.)	36,628	
85	27 April 2003	Svangaskarð, Toftir (H)	Kazakhstan	3–2	Friendly	Borg, Petersen, Lakjuni	420	
86	29 April 2003	Tórsvøllur, Tórshavn (H)	Kazakhstan	2–1	Friendly	Fløtum, Johnsson	800	
87	7 June 2003	Laugardalsvöllur, Reykjavík (A)	Iceland	1–2	UEFA Euro 2004 qualifying	R. Jacobsen	6,036	
88	11 June 2003	Tórsvøllur, Tórshavn (H)	Germany	0–2	UEFA Euro 2004 qualifying	—	6,130	
89	20 August 2003	Tórsvøllur, Tórshavn (H)	Iceland	1–2	UEFA Euro 2004 qualifying	R. Jacobsen	3,416	
90	6 September 2003	Hampden Park, Glasgow (A)	Scotland	1–3	UEFA Euro 2004 qualifying	Johnsson	40,901	
91	10 September 2003	Svangaskarð, Toftir (H)	Lithuania	1–3	UEFA Euro 2004 qualifying	S. Olsen	2,175	
92	21 February 2004	Estadio Bahía Sur, San Fernando (N)	Poland	0–6	Friendly	—	100	
93	1 June 2004	Stade Olympique de la Pontaise, Lausanne (N)	Netherlands	0–3	Friendly	—	3,150	
94	18 August 2004	Svangaskarð, Toftir (H)	Malta	3–2	Friendly	Borg, R. Jacobsen, Benjaminsen	1,932	
95	4 September 2004	St. Jakob-Park, Basel (A)	Switzerland	0–6	2006 FIFA World Cup qualifying	—	13,013	
96	8 September 2004	Tórsvøllur, Tórshavn (H)	France	0–2	2006 FIFA World Cup qualifying	—	5,917	
97	9 October 2004	GSP Stadium, Nicosia (A)	Cyprus	2–2	2006 FIFA World Cup qualifying	Jørgensen, R. Jacobsen	2,043	
98	13 October 2004	Lansdowne Road, Dublin (A)	Republic of Ireland	0–2	2006 FIFA World Cup qualifying	—	36,000	
99	4 June 2005	Svangaskarð, Toftir (H)	Switzerland	1–3	2006 FIFA World Cup qualifying	R. Jacobsen	2,047	
100	8 June 2005	Tórsvøllur, Tórshavn (H)	Republic of Ireland	0–2	2006 FIFA World Cup qualifying	—	5,180	
101	17 August 2005	Svangaskarð, Toftir (H)	Cyprus	0–3	2006 FIFA World Cup qualifying	—	2,720	
102	3 September 2005	Stade Félix-Bollaert, Lens (A)	France	0–3	2006 FIFA World Cup qualifying	—	40,126	
103	7 September 2005	Tórsvøllur, Tórshavn (H)	Israel	0–2	2006 FIFA World Cup qualifying	—	2,240	
104	8 October 2005	Ramat Gan Stadium, Ramat Gan (A)	Israel	1–2	2006 FIFA World Cup qualifying	Samuelsen	31,857	
105	14 May 2006	Głowny Stadium, Wronki (A)	Poland	0–4	Friendly	—	4,000	
106	16 August 2006	Svangaskarð, Toftir (H)	Georgia	0–6	UEFA Euro 2008 qualifying	—	2,114	
107	2 September 2006	Celtic Park, Glasgow (A)	Scotland	0–6	UEFA Euro 2008 qualifying	—	50,059	
108	7 October 2006	Tórsvøllur, Tórshavn (H)	Lithuania	0–1	UEFA Euro 2008 qualifying	—	1,982	
109	11 October 2006	Stade Auguste-Bonal, Montbéliard (A)	France	0–5	UEFA Euro 2008 qualifying	—	19,314	
110	24 March 2007	Svangaskarð, Toftir (H)	Ukraine	0–2	UEFA Euro 2008 qualifying	—	747	
111	28 March 2007	Boris Paichadze Dinamo Arena, Tbilisi (A)	Georgia	1–3	UEFA Euro 2008 qualifying	R. Jacobsen	8,000	
112	2 June 2007	Tórsvøllur, Tórshavn (H)	Italy	1–2	UEFA Euro 2008 qualifying	R. Jacobsen	5,987	
113	6 June 2007	Svangaskarð, Toftir (H)	Scotland	0–2	UEFA Euro 2008 qualifying	—	4,100	
114	12 September 2007	Darius and Girėnas Stadium, Kaunas (A)	Lithuania	1–2	UEFA Euro 2008 qualifying	R. Jacobsen	4,000	
115	13 October 2007	Tórsvøllur, Tórshavn (H)	France	0–6	UEFA Euro 2008 qualifying	—	1,980	
116	17 October 2007	Olimpiyskiy National Sports Complex, Kyiv (A)	Ukraine	0–5	UEFA Euro 2008 qualifying	—	8,000	
117	21 November 2007	Stadio Alberto Braglia, Modena (A)	Italy	1–3	UEFA Euro 2008 qualifying	R. Jacobsen	16,142	
118	16 March 2008	Kórinn fjölnota knatthús, Kópavogur (A)	Iceland	0–3	Friendly	—	747	
119	4 June 2008	Lilleküla Stadium, Tallinn (A)	Estonia	3–4	Friendly	Holst (2), S. Olsen	2,300	
120	20 August 2008	Estádio Municipal de Aveiro, Aveiro (A)	Portugal	0–5	Friendly	—	21,000	
121	6 September 2008	Stadion Crvena Zvezda, Belgrade (A)	Serbia	0–2	2010 FIFA World Cup qualifying	—	9,615	
122	10 September 2008	Tórsvøllur, Tórshavn (H)	Romania	0–1	2010 FIFA World Cup qualifying	—	200	
123	11 October 2008	Tórsvøllur, Tórshavn (H)	Austria	1–1	2010 FIFA World Cup qualifying	Løkin	1,800	
124	15 October 2008	Darius and Girėnas Stadium, Kaunas (A)	Lithuania	0–1	2010 FIFA World Cup qualifying	—	3,000	
125	22 March 2009	Kórinn fjölnota knatthús, Kópavogur (A)	Iceland	2–1	Friendly	Benjaminsen, Antoníusson	553	
126	10 June 2009	Tórsvøllur, Tórshavn (H)	Serbia	0–2	2010 FIFA World Cup qualifying	—	2,896	
127	12 August 2009	Tórsvøllur, Tórshavn (H)	France	0–1	2010 FIFA World Cup qualifying	—	3,000	
128	5 September 2009	UPC-Arena, Graz (A)	Austria	1–3	2010 FIFA World Cup qualifying	A. Olsen	12,300	
129	9 September 2009	Svangaskarð, Toftir (H)	Lithuania	2–1	2010 FIFA World Cup qualifying	S. Olsen, A. Hansen	1,942	
130	10 October 2009	Stade du Roudourou, Guingamp (A)	France	0–5	2010 FIFA World Cup qualifying	—	16,755	
131	14 October 2009	Stadionul Ceahlăul, Piatra Neamţ (A)	Romania	1–3	2010 FIFA World Cup qualifying	Bø	13,500	
132	21 March 2010	Kórinn fjölnota knatthús, Kópavogur (A)	Iceland	0–2	Friendly	—	312	
133	4 June 2010	Stade Alphonse Theis, Hesperange (A)	Luxembourg	0–0	Friendly	—	713	
134	11 August 2010	Lilleküla Stadium, Tallinn (A)	Estonia	1–2	UEFA Euro 2012 qualifying	Edmundsson	5,201	
135	3 September 2010	Tórsvøllur, Tórshavn (H)	Serbia	0–3	UEFA Euro 2012 qualifying	—	1,847	
136	7 September 2010	Stadio Artemio Franchi, Florence (A)	Italy	0–5	UEFA Euro 2012 qualifying	—	19,266	
137	8 October 2010	Stožice Stadium, Ljubljana (A)	Slovenia	1–5	UEFA Euro 2012 qualifying	Mouritsen	15,750	
138	12 October 2010	Svangaskarð, Toftir (H)	Northern Ireland	1–1	UEFA Euro 2012 qualifying	Holst	1,921	
139	16 November 2010	Pittodrie Stadium, Aberdeen (A)	Scotland	0–3	Friendly	—	10,873	
140	3 June 2011	Svangaskarð, Toftir (H)	Slovenia	0–2	UEFA Euro 2012 qualifying	—	974	
141	7 June 2011	Svangaskarð, Toftir (H)	Estonia	2–0	UEFA Euro 2012 qualifying	Benjaminsen, A. Hansen	1,715	
142	10 August 2011	Windsor Park, Belfast (A)	Northern Ireland	0–4	UEFA Euro 2012 qualifying	—	13,183	
143	2 September 2011	Tórsvøllur, Tórshavn (H)	Italy	0–1	UEFA Euro 2012 qualifying	—	5,654	
144	6 September 2011	Partizan Stadium, Belgrade (A)	Serbia	1–3	UEFA Euro 2012 qualifying	Benjaminsen	7,500	
145	15 August 2012	Laugardalsvöllur, Reykjavík (A)	Iceland	0–2	Friendly	—	7,256	
146	7 September 2012	AWD-Arena, Hanover (A)	Germany	0–3	2014 FIFA World Cup qualifying	—	32,769	
147	12 October 2012	Tórsvøllur, Tórshavn (H)	Sweden	1–2	2014 FIFA World Cup qualifying	Baldvinsson	5,079	
148	16 October 2012	Tórsvøllur, Tórshavn (H)	Republic of Ireland	1–4	2014 FIFA World Cup qualifying	A. Hansen	4,300	
149	22 March 2013	Ernst-Happel-Stadion, Vienna (A)	Austria	0–6	2014 FIFA World Cup qualifying	—	24,200	
150	7 June 2013	Aviva Stadium, Dublin (A)	Republic of Ireland	0–3	2014 FIFA World Cup qualifying	—	30,085	
151	11 June 2013	Friends Arena, Solna (A)	Sweden	0–2	2014 FIFA World Cup qualifying	—	32,858	
152	14 August 2013	Laugardalsvöllur, Reykjavík (A)	Iceland	0–1	Friendly	—	4,815	
153	6 September 2013	Astana Arena, Astana (A)	Kazakhstan	1–2	2014 FIFA World Cup qualifying	Benjaminsen	7,000	
154	10 September 2013	Tórsvøllur, Tórshavn (H)	Germany	0–3	2014 FIFA World Cup qualifying	—	4,100	
155	11 October 2013	Tórsvøllur, Tórshavn (H)	Kazakhstan	1–1	2014 FIFA World Cup qualifying	Hansson	1,870	
156	15 October 2013	Tórsvøllur, Tórshavn (H)	Austria	0–3	2014 FIFA World Cup qualifying	—	3,100	
157	19 November 2013	Ta' Qali National Stadium, Ta' Qali (A)	Malta	2–3	Friendly	Hansson, Baldvinsson	1,000	
158	1 March 2014	Victoria Stadium, Gibraltar (A)	Gibraltar	4–1	Friendly	Edmundsson, Holst (2), Hansson	500	
159	7 September 2014	Tórsvøllur, Tórshavn (H)	Finland	1–3	UEFA Euro 2016 qualifying	Holst	3,330	
160	11 October 2014	Windsor Park, Belfast (A)	Northern Ireland	0–2	UEFA Euro 2016 qualifying	—	10,049	
161	14 October 2014	Tórsvøllur, Tórshavn (H)	Hungary	0–1	UEFA Euro 2016 qualifying	—	2,000	
162	14 November 2014	Karaiskakis Stadium, Piraeus (A)	Greece	1–0	UEFA Euro 2016 qualifying	Edmundsson	16,821	
163	29 March 2015	Ilie Oană Stadium, Ploiești (A)	Romania	0–1	UEFA Euro 2016 qualifying	—	13,898	
164	13 June 2015	Tórsvøllur, Tórshavn (H)	Greece	2–1	UEFA Euro 2016 qualifying	Hansson, Olsen	4,741	
165	4 September 2015	Tórsvøllur, Tórshavn (H)	Northern Ireland	1–3	UEFA Euro 2016 qualifying	Edmundsson	4,513	
166	7 September 2015	Helsinki Olympic Stadium, Helsinki (A)	Finland	0–1	UEFA Euro 2016 qualifying	—	9,477	
167	8 October 2015	Ferencváros Stadion, Budapest (A)	Hungary	1–2	UEFA Euro 2016 qualifying	R. Jakobsen	16,797	
168	11 October 2015	Tórsvøllur, Tórshavn (H)	Romania	0–3	UEFA Euro 2016 qualifying	—	3,941	
169	28 March 2016	Estadio Municipal de Marbella, Marbella (N)	Liechtenstein	3–2	Friendly	B. Olsen, Edmundsson, Vatnhamar	50	
170	3 June 2016	PSD Bank Arena, Frankfurt (N)	Kosovo	0–2	Friendly	—	7,000	
171	6 September 2016	Tórsvøllur, Tórshavn (H)	Hungary	0–0	2018 FIFA World Cup qualification	—	4,066	
172	7 October 2016	Skonto Stadium, Riga (A)	Latvia	2–0	2018 FIFA World Cup qualification	Nattestad, Edmundsson	4,823	
173	10 October 2016	Tórsvøllur, Tórshavn (H)	Portugal	0–6	2018 FIFA World Cup qualification	—	4,748	
174	13 November 2016	Swissporarena, Lucerne (A)	Switzerland	0–2	2018 FIFA World Cup qualification	—	14,800	
175	25 March 2017	Estadi Nacional, Andorra la Vella (A)	Andorra	0–0	2018 FIFA World Cup qualification	—	1,755	
176	9 June 2017	Tórsvøllur, Tórshavn (H)	Switzerland	0–2	2018 FIFA World Cup qualification	—	4,594	
177	31 August 2017	Estádio do Bessa, Porto (A)	Portugal	1–5	2018 FIFA World Cup qualification	Baldvinsson	25,087	
178	3 September 2017	Tórsvøllur, Tórshavn (H)	Andorra	1–0	2018 FIFA World Cup qualification	Rólantsson	4,357	
179	7 October 2017	Tórsvøllur, Tórshavn (H)	Latvia	0–0	2018 FIFA World Cup qualification	—	4,203	
180	10 October 2017	Ferencváros Stadion, Budapest (A)	Hungary	0–1	2018 FIFA World Cup qualification	—	21,400	
181	22 March 2018	Estadio Municipal de Marbella, Marbella (N)	Latvia	1–1	Friendly	Gregersen	152	
182	25 March 2018	Estadio Municipal de Marbella, Marbella (N)	Liechtenstein	3–0	Friendly	Bartalsstovu, B. Olsen, Nattestad	85	
183	7 September 2018	Tórsvøllur, Tórshavn (H)	Malta	3–1	2018–19 UEFA Nations League	Edmundsson, Joensen, Hansson	3,234	
184	10 September 2018	Fadil Vokrri Stadium, Pristina (A)	Kosovo	0–2	2018–19 UEFA Nations League	—	12,677	
185	11 October 2018	Tórsvøllur, Tórshavn (H)	Azerbaijan	0–3	2018–19 UEFA Nations League	—	2,820	
186	14 October 2018	Tórsvøllur, Tórshavn (H)	Kosovo	1–1	2018–19 UEFA Nations League	Joensen	2,300	
187	17 November 2018	Baku Olympic Stadium, Baku (A)	Azerbaijan	0–2	2018–19 UEFA Nations League	—	12,653	
188	20 November 2018	National Stadium, Ta' Qali (A)	Malta	1–1	2018–19 UEFA Nations League	Joensen	2,152	
189	23 March 2019	National Stadium, Ta' Qali (A)	Malta	1–2	UEFA Euro 2020 qualifying	Thomsen	7,531	
190	26 March 2019	Stadionul Dr. Constantin Rădulescu, Cluj-Napoca (A)	Romania	1–4	UEFA Euro 2020 qualifying	Davidsen	10,502	
191	7 June 2019	Tórsvøllur, Tórshavn (H)	Spain	1–4	UEFA Euro 2020 qualifying	K. Olsen	3,226	
192	10 June 2019	Tórsvøllur, Tórshavn (H)	Norway	0–2	UEFA Euro 2020 qualifying	—	3,083	
193	5 September 2019	Tórsvøllur, Tórshavn (H)	Sweden	0–4	UEFA Euro 2020 qualifying	—	3,108	
194	8 September 2019	El Molinón, Gijón (A)	Spain	0–4	UEFA Euro 2020 qualifying	—	23,644	
195	12 October 2019	Tórsvøllur, Tórshavn (H)	Romania	0–3	UEFA Euro 2020 qualifying	—	2,380	
196	15 October 2019	Tórsvøllur, Tórshavn (H)	Malta	1–0	UEFA Euro 2020 qualifying	Baldvinsson	2,677	
197	15 November 2019	Ullevaal Stadion, Oslo (A)	Norway	0–4	UEFA Euro 2020 qualifying	—	10,400	
198	18 November 2019	Friends Arena, Solna (A)	Sweden	0–3	UEFA Euro 2020 qualifying	—	19,500	

== Head-to-head record ==
Team	Pld	W	D	L	GF	GA	GD	WPCT
Andorra	3	1	2	0	1	0	+1	33.33
Austria	6	1	1	4	3	16	−13	16.67
Azerbaijan	3	0	0	3	0	8	−8	0.00
Belgium	2	0	0	2	0	6	−6	0.00
Bosnia and Herzegovina	2	0	1	1	2	3	−1	0.00
Canada	2	1	0	1	1	1	0	50.00
Cyprus	4	0	1	3	3	10	−7	0.00
Czech Republic	4	0	0	4	0	7	−7	0.00
Czechoslovakia (Note: Includes results against Representation of Czechs and Slovaks.)	2	0	0	2	0	7	−7	0.00
Denmark	3	0	0	3	1	10	−9	0.00
Estonia	7	2	1	4	10	15	−5	28.57
Finland	5	0	0	5	1	14	−13	0.00
France	6	0	0	6	0	22	−22	0.00
FR Yugoslavia	4	0	0	4	2	19	−17	0.00
Georgia	2	0	0	2	1	9	−8	0.00
Germany	4	0	0	4	1	10	−9	0.00
Gibraltar	1	1	0	0	4	1	+3	100.00
Greece	4	2	0	2	4	11	−7	50.00
Hungary	4	0	1	3	1	4	−3	0.00
Iceland	13	1	0	12	8	24	−16	7.69
Israel	3	0	1	2	2	5	−3	0.00
Italy	4	0	0	4	2	11	−9	0.00
Kazakhstan	4	2	1	1	7	6	+1	50.00
Kosovo	3	0	1	2	1	5	−4	0.00
Latvia	3	1	2	0	3	1	+2	33.33
Liechtenstein	5	5	0	0	11	3	+8	100.00
Lithuania	8	1	1	6	4	11	−7	12.50
Luxembourg	3	2	1	0	3	0	+3	66.67
Malta	8	5	1	2	15	11	+4	62.50
Netherlands	1	0	0	1	0	3	−3	0.00
Northern Ireland	6	0	2	4	3	16	−13	0.00
Norway	4	0	0	4	0	15	−15	0.00
Poland	3	0	0	3	1	12	−11	0.00
Portugal	3	0	0	3	1	16	−15	0.00
Republic of Ireland	4	0	0	4	1	11	−10	0.00
Romania	8	0	0	8	2	26	−24	0.00
Russia	4	0	0	4	2	12	−10	0.00
San Marino	2	2	0	0	6	1	+5	100.00
Scotland	9	0	2	7	6	26	−20	0.00
Serbia	4	0	0	4	1	10	−9	0.00
Slovakia	2	0	0	2	1	5	−4	0.00
Slovenia	4	0	1	3	3	12	−9	0.00
Spain	4	0	0	4	3	17	−14	0.00
Sweden	5	0	1	4	1	11	−10	0.00
Switzerland	6	0	0	6	2	19	−17	0.00
Turkey	1	0	1	0	1	1	0	0.00
Ukraine	2	0	0	2	0	7	−7	0.00
Wales	2	0	0	2	0	9	−9	0.00
Yugoslavia	2	0	0	2	0	9	−9	0.00
Total	198	27	22	149	125	488	−363	13.64

Source: Results
