= 1991 1. deild =

Coordinates: 62.0167°N 6.7667°W

Faroe Islands Premier League Football
- Season: 1991
- Champions: KÍ
- Relegated: MB; Sumba
- Matches: 90
- Goals: 269 (2.99 per match)
- Top goalscorer: Símun Petur Justinussen (15 goals)
- Biggest home win: B36 6–0 MB; HB 8–2 B36
- Biggest away win: Sumba 0–4 MB
- Highest scoring: HB 8–2 B36

Statistics of 1. deild in the 1991 season.

== Overview ==
It was contested by 10 teams, and KÍ Klaksvík won the championship.

== League standings ==
Pos	Team	Pld	W	D	L	GF	GA	GD	Pts
1	KÍ Klaksvík	18	10	4	4	31	19	+12	24
2	B36 Tórshavn	18	10	4	4	37	28	+9	24
3	GÍ Gøta	18	10	3	5	38	27	+11	23
4	VB Vágur	18	10	3	5	29	19	+10	23
5	TB Tvøroyri	18	9	2	7	29	22	+7	20
6	Havnar Bóltfelag	18	7	4	7	37	29	+8	18
7	B68 Toftir	18	4	8	6	17	21	−4	16
8	NSÍ Runavík	18	6	3	9	18	25	−7	15
9	MB Miðvágur	18	4	4	10	14	28	−14	12
10	Sumba	18	2	1	15	19	51	−32	5

== Results ==
The schedule consisted of a total of 14 games. Each team played two games against every opponent in no particular order. One of the games was at home and one was away.

Home \ Away	B36	B68	GÍG	HB	KÍ	MBM	NSÍ	SUM	TB	VBV
B36 Tórshavn		3–1	3–2	1–1	0–3	6–0	1–1	2–1	5–2	2–3
B68 Toftir	0–0		2–2	0–2	0–0	1–0	0–1	2–2	1–0	3–0
GÍ Gøta	2–3	2–1		4–3	2–1	3–0	1–3	3–0	0–0	2–2
HB	8–2	0–0	2–4		3–2	4–0	2–0	1–3	1–2	1–2
KÍ	3–0	1–1	2–1	3–2		0–0	3–2	3–1	2–1	1–0
MB Miðvágur	0–2	1–1	1–2	0–0	1–2		1–0	3–0	1–0	2–3
NSÍ Runavík	0–2	1–1	0–2	0–0	1–0	2–0		3–1	1–2	0–3
Sumbiar ítróttarfelag	1–3	3–2	1–3	1–4	1–3	0–4	1–2		1–3	1–2
TB	0–0	3–1	2–3	4–1	1–0	2–0	3–1	4–1		0–2
VB Vágur	1–2	0–1	1–0	1–2	2–2	0–0	2–0	4–0	1–0	

Source: www.faroesoccer.com
Legend: Blue = home team win; Yellow = draw; Red = away team win.

== Top goalscorers ==
Source: faroesoccer.com

Rank	Player	Club	Goals
1	(Faroe Islands) Símun Petur Justinussen	GÍ	13 (2)
2	(Faroe Islands) Gunnar Mohr	HB	13
3	(Faroe Islands) Kári Reynheim	B36	11
4	(Faroe Islands) Jan Allan Müller	VB	8 (2)
5	(Faroe Islands) Todi Jónsson	KÍ	9
5	(Faroe Islands) Uni Arge	KÍ	9
7	(Faroe Islands) Birgir Jørgensen	MB	7
7	(Faroe Islands) Bogi Johannesen	TB	7
