= 2014–15 Faroe Islands v Greece football matches =

UEFA Euro 2016 qualifying match

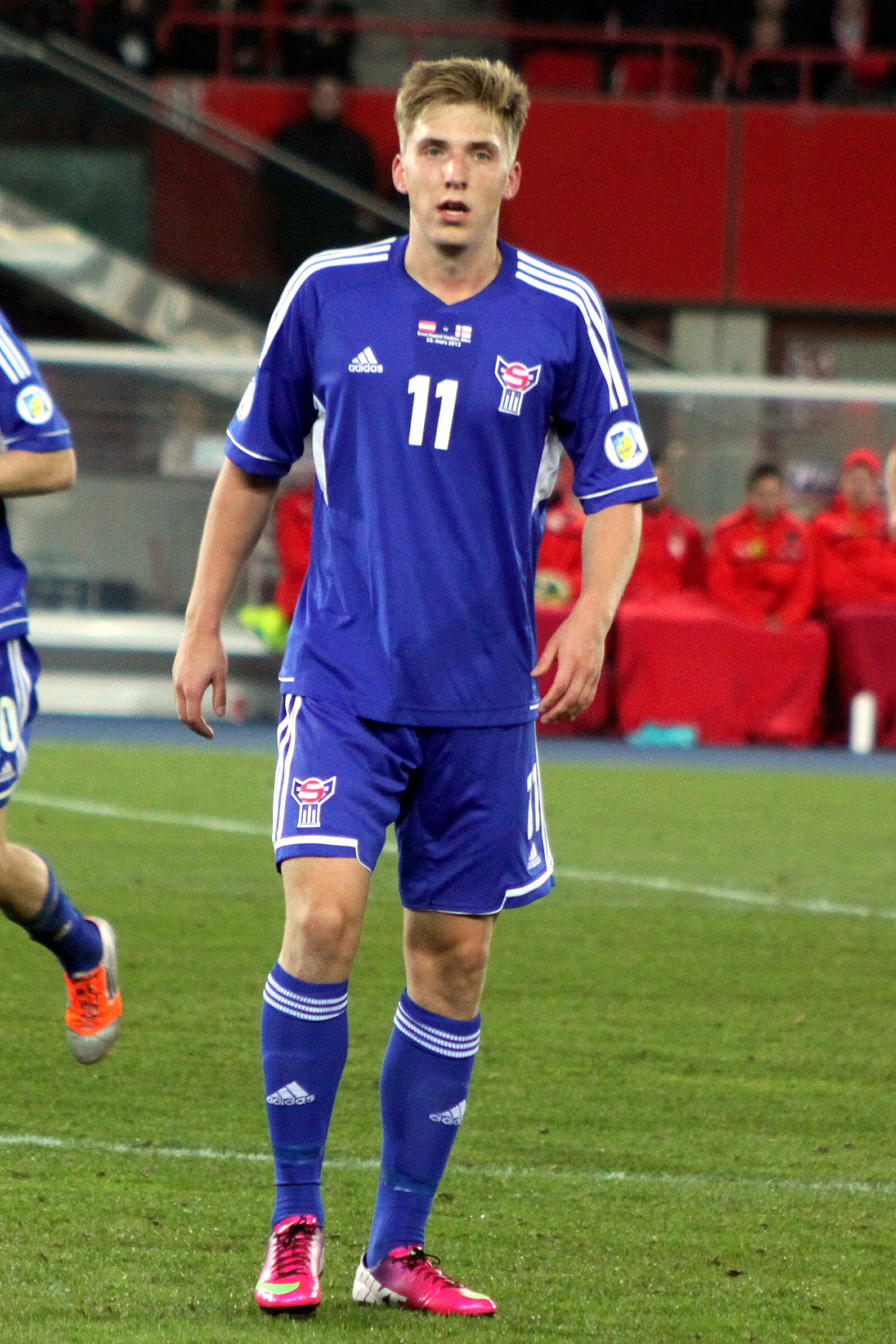
Jóan Símun Edmundsson scored the only goal of the 2014 match

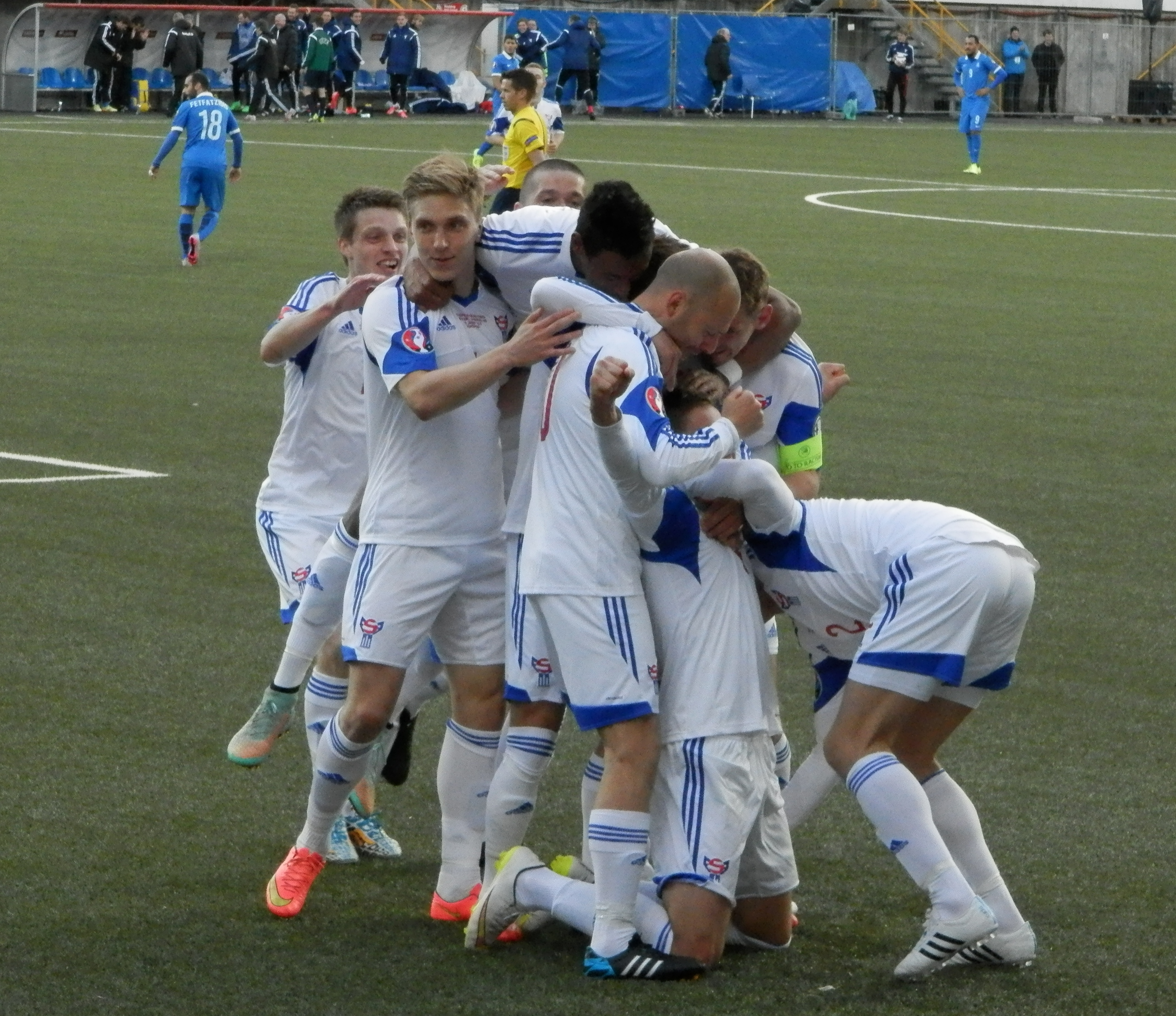
Faroese players celebrating their first goal in the 2015 match

On 14 November 2014, the Greece national football team met the Faroe Islands national football team during a UEFA Euro 2016 qualifying match at Karaiskakis Stadium in Piraeus, Attica, Greece. To the surprise of many, the Faroe Islands won 1–0, with the only goal of the game coming from Jóan Símun Edmundsson, causing what many consider to be one of the biggest upsets in UEFA Euro qualifying history. It was the biggest shock in terms of FIFA World Rankings, as Greece were ranked 18th and the Faroe Islands were ranked 187th.

On 13 June 2015, the teams met in the return match at Tórsvøllur, Tórshavn. The Faroe Islands won again with a 2–1 scoreline. The games are considered by many Greeks to be one of their most humiliating defeats in international football, while many Faroese people consider the matches to be one of their greatest triumphs.

== Background ==
The Greece national team had taken part in the 2014 FIFA World Cup in Brazil, reaching the round of 16 for the first time ever before being eliminated only on penalties by the surprising Costa Rica after a 1–1 draw in regulation time. Despite this, they didn't start well in the Euro qualifying, losing at home to Romania, drawing away with Finland and losing at home again to Northern Ireland. Greece had famously won the UEFA Euro 2004 tournament as huge underdogs, although only Kostas Katsouranis was still playing for the team following the World Cup ten years later and he did not take any part against the Faroes.

The Faroe Islands team started their campaign with three defeats: at home to Finland, away to Northern Ireland, and home to Hungary. They had not won a competitive international match away from home since beating Luxembourg in 2001 and had only three home wins since then.

The respective populations of the countries at the time were approximately 10.93 million and 48,000.

== 2014 match ==
=== Details ===
14 November 2014
21:45 EET
UEFA Euro 2016 qualifying
Group F
Matchday 4

Greece	0–1	Faroe Islands
	Report	Edmundsson 61'

Karaiskakis Stadium, Piraeus
Attendance: 16,821
Referee: Nicola Rizzoli (Italy)

Greece	Faroe Islands

GK	1	Orestis Karnezis
RB	15	Vasilis Torosidis (c)
CB	4	Kostas Manolas	(yellow card) 88'
CB	5	Vangelis Moras
LB	3	Nikolaos Karabelas		(substituted off) 78'
DM	2	Giannis Maniatis
DM	22	Andreas Samaris
AM	8	Panagiotis Kone
AM	10	Lazaros Christodoulopoulos
CF	18	Nikos Karelis		(substituted off) 62'
CF	17	Theofanis Gekas		(substituted off) 46'
Substitutes:
FW	23	Stefanos Athanasiadis		(substituted on) 46'
DF	16	Charalampos Mavrias		(substituted on) 62'
MF	9	Petros Mantalos		(substituted on) 78'
Manager:
(Italy) Claudio Ranieri

GK	1	Gunnar Nielsen
CB	4	Atli Gregersen	(yellow card) 57'
CB	7	Fróði Benjaminsen (c)
CB	5	Sonni Nattestad
RM	2	Jónas Tór Næs
CM	8	Brandur Hendriksson	(yellow card) 33'	(substituted off) 88'
CM	6	Hallur Hansson	(yellow card) 49'
LM	3	Viljormur Davidsen
AM	10	Christian Holst		(substituted off) 76'
AM	16	Sølvi Vatnhamar
CF	11	Jóan Símun Edmundsson		(substituted off) 86'
Substitutes:
MF	13	Pól Jóhannus Justinussen		(substituted on) 76'
DF	18	Odmar Færø		(substituted on) 86'
FW	15	Klæmint Olsen		(substituted on) 88'
Manager:
(Denmark) Lars Olsen

Match rules

- 90 minutes.
- Maximum of three substitutions.

=== Aftermath ===
The result caused the sacking of head coach Claudio Ranieri, whose next job would be manager of English club Leicester City the following July. In his first season, the club would go on to win the 2015–16 Premier League in what is also considered to be one of the biggest shocks in the sports.

Before the return fixture, the Faroe Islands suffered an away defeat to Romania, while Greece got a goalless away draw against Hungary.

== 2015 match ==
=== Details ===
13 June 2015
19:45 WEST
UEFA Euro 2016 qualifying
Group F
Matchday 6

Faroe Islands	2–1	Greece
Hansson 32'; Hendriksson 70'	Report	Sokratis 84'

Tórsvøllur, Tórshavn
Attendance: 4,731
Referee: Tom Harald Hagen (Norway)

Faroe Islands	Greece

GK	1	Gunnar Nielsen
CB	4	Atli Gregersen	(yellow card) 76'
CB	7	Fróði Benjaminsen (c)	(yellow card) 27'
CB	5	Sonni Nattestad	(yellow card) 5'
RM	22	Bárður Hansen	(yellow card) 55'
CM	8	Brandur Hendriksson	(yellow card) 84'
CM	6	Hallur Hansson
LM	9	Gilli Rólantsson		(substituted off) 13'
AM	10	Christian Holst		(substituted off) 74'
AM	14	Sølvi Vatnhamar
CF	11	Jóan Símun Edmundsson		(substituted off) 90+2'
Substitutes:
DF	2	Jóhan Troest Davidsen		(substituted on) 13'
DF	15	Odmar Færø		(substituted on) 74'
MF	20	René Joensen		(substituted on) 90+2'
Manager:
(Denmark) Lars Olsen

GK	1	Orestis Karnezis
RB	15	Vasilis Torosidis (c)	(yellow card) 57'
CB	4	Kostas Manolas
CB	19	Sokratis Papastathopoulos
LB	3	Kostas Stafylidis
DM	22	Andreas Samaris
RM	18	Giannis Fetfatzidis		(substituted off) 71'
CM	8	Panagiotis Kone		(substituted off) 81'
CM	10	Lazaros Christodoulopoulos		(substituted off) 46'
LM	14	Nikos Karelis	(yellow card) 90'
CF	9	Kostas Mitroglou
Substitutes:
MF	7	Sotiris Ninis		(substituted on) 46'
MF	17	Dimitris Kolovos		(substituted on) 71'
FW	20	Taxiarchis Fountas		(substituted on) 81'
Manager:
(Uruguay) Sergio Markarián

Match rules

- 90 minutes.
- Maximum of three substitutions.

Seven Greek players (goalkeeper Orestis Karnezis, Kostas Manolas, Panagiotis Kone, Lazaros Christodoulopoulos, Nikos Karelis, captain Vasilis Torosidis and Andreas Samaris) took part in both matches; on the Faroese side, nine players (goalkeeper Gunnar Nielsen, Atli Gregersen, Sonni Nattestad, Hallur Hansson, captain Fróði Benjaminsen, Brandur Hendriksson, Christian Holst, Jóan Símun Edmundsson and substitute Odmar Færø) took part in both.

=== Aftermath ===
Greece national team coach Sergio Markarián resigned in the following month, having lasted only two matches in charge.

The six points taken from the Greece fixtures were the only ones gained by the Faroese in the campaign. Greece got an away draw with Romania in September 2015 and finally won their first match on the last matchday, beating Hungary 4–3 at home, but it wasn't enough to avoid bottom place. Both teams finished with six points, the Faroes having the advantage on the head-to-head record.
