= UEFA Euro 2004 qualifying Group 5 =

Football tournament qualification stage

Standings and results for Group 5 of the UEFA Euro 2004 qualifying tournament.

Group 5 consisted of Faroe Islands, Germany, Iceland, Lithuania and Scotland. Group winners were Germany, who finished four points clear of second-placed team Scotland who qualified for the play-offs.

== Standings ==
| Pos | Team | Pld | W | D | L | GF | GA | GD | Pts | Qualification | (Germany) | (Scotland) | (Iceland) | (Lithuania) | (Faroe Islands) |
|---|---|---|---|---|---|---|---|---|---|---|---|---|---|---|---|
| 1 | Germany | 8 | 5 | 3 | 0 | 13 | 4 | +9 | 18 | Qualify for final tournament | — | 2–1 | 3–0 | 1–1 | 2–1 |
| 2 | Scotland | 8 | 4 | 2 | 2 | 12 | 8 | +4 | 14 | Advance to play-offs | 1–1 | — | 2–1 | 1–0 | 3–1 |
| 3 | Iceland | 8 | 4 | 1 | 3 | 11 | 9 | +2 | 13 | | 0–0 | 0–2 | — | 3–0 | 2–1 |
| 4 | Lithuania | 8 | 3 | 1 | 4 | 7 | 11 | −4 | 10 | | 0–2 | 1–0 | 0–3 | — | 2–0 |
| 5 | Faroe Islands | 8 | 0 | 1 | 7 | 7 | 18 | −11 | 1 | | 0–2 | 2–2 | 1–2 | 1–3 | — |

Source: UEFA
Rules for classification: Qualification tiebreakers

== Matches ==
7 September 2002
15:00 UTC+1

| Faroe Islands | 2–2 | Scotland |
|---|---|---|
| Petersen 7', 13' | Report | Lambert 62'; Ferguson 83' |

Svangaskarð, Toftir
Attendance: 4,200
Referee: Jacek Granat (Poland)
7 September 2002
18:30 UTC+2

| Lithuania | 0–2 | Germany |
|---|---|---|
| | Report | Ballack 27'; Stankevičius 59' (o.g.) |

S. Darius and S. Girėnas Stadium, Kaunas
Attendance: 8,244
Referee: Graham Poll (England)

12 October 2002
14:00 UTC

| Iceland | 0–2 | Scotland |
|---|---|---|
| | Report | Dailly 6'; Naysmith 63' |

Laugardalsvöllur, Reykjavík
Attendance: 7,056
Referee: Alain Sars (France)
12 October 2002
17:00 UTC+2

| Lithuania | 2–0 | Faroe Islands |
|---|---|---|
| Ražanauskas 23' (pen.); Poškus 37' | Report |

S. Darius and S. Girėnas Stadium, Kaunas
Attendance: 1,200
Referee: Dejan Delević (FR Yugoslavia)

16 October 2002
18:10 UTC

| Iceland | 3–0 | Lithuania |
|---|---|---|
| Helguson 50'; Guðjohnsen 61', 74' | Report |

Laugardalsvöllur, Reykjavík
Attendance: 3,513
Referee: Grzegorz Gilewski (Poland)
16 October 2002
20:30 UTC+2

| Germany | 2–1 | Faroe Islands |
|---|---|---|
| Ballack 2' (pen.); Klose 59' | Report | Friedrich 45' (o.g.) |

AWD-Arena, Hanover
Attendance: 36,628
Referee: Dani Koren (Israel)

29 March 2003
15:00 UTC

| Scotland | 2–1 | Iceland |
|---|---|---|
| Miller 12'; Wilkie 71' | Report | Guðjohnsen 49' |

Hampden Park, Glasgow
Attendance: 37,938
Referee: René Temmink (Netherlands)
29 March 2003
19:00 UTC+1

| Germany | 1–1 | Lithuania |
|---|---|---|
| Ramelow 7' | Report | Ražanauskas 72' |

Frankenstadion, Nuremberg
Attendance: 40,754
Referee: Victor José Esquinas Torres (Spain)

2 April 2003
21:00 UTC+3

| Lithuania | 1–0 | Scotland |
|---|---|---|
| Ražanauskas 74' (pen.) | Report |

S. Darius and S. Girėnas Stadium, Kaunas
Attendance: 8,244
Referee: Fritz Stuchlik (Austria)

7 June 2003
15:00 UTC+1

| Scotland | 1–1 | Germany |
|---|---|---|
| Miller 69' | Report | Bobic 22' |

Hampden Park, Glasgow
Attendance: 48,047
Referee: Domenico Messina (Italy)
7 June 2003
16:00 UTC

| Iceland | 2–1 | Faroe Islands |
|---|---|---|
| Sigurðsson 51'; Guðmundsson 90' | Report | Jacobsen 63' |

Laugardalsvöllur, Reykjavík
Attendance: 6,038
Referee: Miroslav Liba (Czech Republic)

11 June 2003
20:00 UTC+3

| Lithuania | 0–3 | Iceland |
|---|---|---|
| | Report | Guðjónsson 60'; Guðjohnsen 71'; Hreiðarsson 90' |

S. Darius and S. Girėnas Stadium, Kaunas
Attendance: 6,500
Referee: Sorin Corpodean (Romania)
11 June 2003
19:45 UTC+1

| Faroe Islands | 0–2 | Germany |
|---|---|---|
| | Report | Klose 89'; Bobic 90' |

Tórsvøllur, Tórshavn
Attendance: 6,130
Referee: Jan Wegereef (Netherlands)

20 August 2003
19:10 UTC+1

| Faroe Islands | 1–2 | Iceland |
|---|---|---|
| Jacobsen 65' | Report | Guðjohnsen 6'; Marteinsson 70' |

Tórsvøllur, Tórshavn
Attendance: 3,416
Referee: Eduardo Iturralde González (Spain)

6 September 2003
15:00 UTC+1

| Scotland | 3–1 | Faroe Islands |
|---|---|---|
| McCann 8'; Dickov 45'; McFadden 73' | Report | Johnsson 35' |

Hampden Park, Glasgow
Attendance: 40,901
Referee: Darko Ceferin (Slovenia)
6 September 2003
17:30 UTC

| Iceland | 0–0 | Germany |
|---|---|---|
| | Report |

Laugardalsvöllur, Reykjavík
Attendance: 7,065
Referee: Graham Barber (England)

10 September 2003
18:30 UTC+1

| Faroe Islands | 1–3 | Lithuania |
|---|---|---|
| Olsen 42' | Report | Morinas 22', 57'; Vencevicius 88' |

Svangaskarð, Toftir
Attendance: 2,175
Referee: Edo Trivkovic (Croatia)
10 September 2003
20:45 UTC+2

| Germany | 2–1 | Scotland |
|---|---|---|
| Bobic 26'; Ballack 50' (pen.) | Report | McCann 60' |

Westfalenstadion, Dortmund
Attendance: 67,000
Referee: Anders Frisk (Sweden)

11 October 2003
16:00 UTC+1

| Scotland | 1–0 | Lithuania |
|---|---|---|
| Fletcher 70' | Report |

Hampden Park, Glasgow
Attendance: 50,343
Referee: Claude Colombo (France)
11 October 2003
17:00 UTC+2

| Germany | 3–0 | Iceland |
|---|---|---|
| Ballack 9'; Bobic 59'; Kurányi 79' | Report |

AOL Arena, Hamburg
Attendance: 50,821
Referee: Valentin Ivanov (Russia)

== Goalscorers ==
There were 50 goals scored in 20 matches, for an average of 2.5 goals per match.

5 goals

- (Iceland) Eiður Guðjohnsen

4 goals

- (Germany) Michael Ballack
- (Germany) Fredi Bobic

3 goals

- (Lithuania) Tomas Ražanauskas

2 goals

- (Faroe Islands) Rógvi Jacobsen
- (Faroe Islands) John Petersen
- (Germany) Miroslav Klose
- (Lithuania) Igoris Morinas
- (Scotland) Neil McCann
- (Scotland) Kenny Miller

1 goal

- (Faroe Islands) Julian Johnsson
- (Faroe Islands) Súni Olsen
- (Germany) Kevin Kurányi
- (Germany) Carsten Ramelow
- (Iceland) Þórður Guðjónsson
- (Iceland) Tryggvi Guðmundsson
- (Iceland) Heiðar Helguson
- (Iceland) Hermann Hreiðarsson
- (Iceland) Pétur Marteinsson
- (Iceland) Helgi Sigurðsson
- (Lithuania) Robertas Poškus
- (Lithuania) Donatas Vencevičius
- (Scotland) Christian Dailly
- (Scotland) Paul Dickov
- (Scotland) Barry Ferguson
- (Scotland) Darren Fletcher
- (Scotland) Paul Lambert
- (Scotland) James McFadden
- (Scotland) Gary Naysmith
- (Scotland) Lee Wilkie

1 own goal

- (Germany) Arne Friedrich (against Faroe Islands)
- (Lithuania) Marius Stankevičius (against Germany)
