= UEFA Euro 1992 qualifying Group 4 =

Football tournament qualifying stage

Standings and results for Group 4 of the UEFA Euro 1992 qualifying tournament.

Group 4 consisted of Austria, Denmark, the Faroe Islands, Northern Ireland and Yugoslavia. Yugoslavia won the group, but then broke up and the succeeding team (FR Yugoslavia) was banned from the final tournament after the outbreak of Yugoslav Wars. As the group's runners-up, Denmark was then given the right to participate in the tournament finals, which they would go on to win. It was the first international tournament for the Faroe Islands and the win against Austria their first competitive win.

== Final table ==
Pos	Team	Pld	W	D	L	GF	GA	GD	Pts	Qualification	(Socialist Federal Republic of Yugoslavia)	(Denmark)	(Northern Ireland)	(Austria)	(Faroe Islands)
1	Yugoslavia	8	7	0	1	24	4	+20	14	Banned from final tournament (Note: Yugoslavia were to participate in the final tournament as FR Yugoslavia. However, the Federal Republic of Yugoslavia was placed under sanctions on 30 May 1992 by the United Nations Security Council Resolution 757 after the outbreak of Yugoslav Wars. FIFA and UEFA therefore suspended FR Yugoslavia from competitive football on 31 May 1992, meaning they could not participate in the final tournament. Group runners-up Denmark instead took the spot at the final tournament.)	—	1–2	4–1	4–1	7–0
2	Denmark	8	6	1	1	18	7	+11	13	Qualified for final tournament	0–2	—	2–1	2–1	4–1
3	Northern Ireland	8	2	3	3	11	11	0	7		0–2	1–1	—	2–1	1–1
4	Austria	8	1	1	6	6	14	−8	3		0–2	0–3	0–0	—	3–0
5	Faroe Islands	8	1	1	6	3	26	−23	3		0–2	0–4	0–5	1–0	—

Source: UEFA
Rules for classification: Qualification tiebreakers

== Results ==
12 September 1990
19:00 CEST

Faroe Islands	1–0	Austria
Nielsen 61'	Report

Landskrona IP, Landskrona, Sweden
Attendance: 1,157
Referee: Egil Nervik (Norway)
12 September 1990
20:00 UTC+1

Northern Ireland	0–2	Yugoslavia
	Report	Pančev 36'; Prosinečki 86'

Windsor Park, Belfast
Attendance: 9,008
Referee: Jacobus Uilenberg (Netherlands)

10 October 1990
19:30 UTC+2

Denmark	4–1	Faroe Islands
M. Laudrup 8', 48'; Elstrup 37'; Povlsen 89'	Report	Mørkøre 21'

Idrætsparken, Copenhagen
Attendance: 38,563
Referee: Guðmundur Haraldsson (Iceland)

17 October 1990
20:00 UTC+1

Northern Ireland	1–1	Denmark
Clarke 58'	Report	Bartram 11' (pen.)

Windsor Park, Belfast
Attendance: 9,079
Referee: Roger Philippi (Luxembourg)

31 October 1990
19:00 UTC+1

Yugoslavia	4–1	Austria
Pančev 32', 52', 85'; Katanec 43'	Report	Ogris 15'

Red Star Stadium, Belgrade
Attendance: 11,422
Referee: Aron Schmidhuber (Germany)

14 November 1990
19:30 UTC+1

Denmark	0–2	Yugoslavia
	Report	Baždarević 77'; Jarni 84'

Idrætsparken, Copenhagen
Attendance: 39,700
Referee: Neil Midgley (England)
14 November 1990
19:30 UTC+1

Austria	0–0	Northern Ireland
	Report

Praterstadion, Vienna
Attendance: 6,753
Referee: Gérard Biguet (France)

27 March 1991
17:15 UTC+1

Yugoslavia	4–1	Northern Ireland
Binić 35'; Pančev 47', 60', 62'	Report	Hill 44'

Red Star Stadium, Belgrade
Attendance: 5,086
Referee: Yusuf Namoğlu (Turkey)

1 May 1991
20:00 UTC+2

Yugoslavia	1–2	Denmark
Pančev 50'	Report	Christensen 31', 63'

Red Star Stadium, Belgrade
Attendance: 16,477
Referee: Joël Quiniou (France)
1 May 1991
20:00 UTC+1

Northern Ireland	1–1	Faroe Islands
Clarke 45'	Report	Reynheim 63'

Windsor Park, Belfast
Attendance: 7,253
Referee: Michel Piraux (Belgium)

16 May 1991
20:00 UTC+2

Yugoslavia	7–0	Faroe Islands
Najdoski 21'; Prosinečki 24'; Pančev 51', 72'; Vulić 65'; Boban 68'; Šuker 85'	Report

Red Star Stadium, Belgrade
Attendance: 6,745
Referee: Vassilios Nikakis (Greece)

22 May 1991
19:00 UTC+2

Austria	3–0	Faroe Islands
Pfeifenberger 13'; Streiter 48'; Wetl 69'	Report

Lehen Stadium, Salzburg
Attendance: 11,757
Referee: Loizos Loizou (Cyprus)

5 June 1991
16:00 UTC+2

Denmark	2–1	Austria
Christensen 2', 33'	Report	Ogris 83'

Odense Stadium, Odense
Attendance: 12,521
Referee: Michał Listkiewicz (Poland)

11 September 1991
19:00 UTC+1

Faroe Islands	0–5	Northern Ireland
	Report	Wilson 8'; Clarke 12', 51', 68' (pen.); McDonald 14'

Landskrona IP, Landskrona
Attendance: 1,623
Referee: Simo Ruokonen (Finland)

25 September 1991
19:00 UTC+1

Faroe Islands	0–4	Denmark
	Report	Christofte 2' (pen.); Christensen 6'; Pingel 78'; Vilfort 75'

Landskrona IP, Landskrona
Attendance: 2,589
Referee: Jim McCluskey (Scotland)

9 October 1991
19:30 UTC+2

Austria	0–3	Denmark
	Report	Artner 9' (o.g.); Povlsen 15'; Christensen 37'

Praterstadion, Vienna
Attendance: 7,453
Referee: Frans van den Wijngaert (Belgium)

16 October 1991
19:00 UTC+1

Faroe Islands	0–2	Yugoslavia
	Report	Jugović 13'; Savićević 80'

Landskrona IP, Landskrona
Attendance: 2,485
Referee: Günther Habermann (Germany)
16 October 1991
19:30 UTC+1

Northern Ireland	2–1	Austria
Dowie 18'; Black 42'	Report	Lainer 44'

Windsor Park, Belfast
Attendance: 6,854
Referee: Leif Sundell (Sweden)

13 November 1991
19:30 UTC+1

Denmark	2–1	Northern Ireland
Povlsen 22', 36'	Report	Taggart 71'

Odense Stadium, Odense
Attendance: 10,881
Referee: Alexey Spirin (Soviet Union)
13 November 1991
19:30 UTC+1

Austria	0–2	Yugoslavia
	Report	Lukić 18'; Savićević 38'

Praterstadion, Vienna
Attendance: 6,212
Referee: Pietro D'Elia (Italy)

== Goalscorers ==
There were 62 goals scored in 20 matches, for an average of 3.1 goals per match.

10 goals

- (Yugoslavia national football team) Darko Pančev

6 goals

- (Denmark national football team) Bent Christensen

5 goals

- (Northern Ireland national football team) Colin Clarke

4 goals

- (Denmark national football team) Flemming Povlsen

2 goals

- (Denmark national football team) Michael Laudrup
- (Yugoslavia national football team) Robert Prosinečki
- (Yugoslavia national football team) Dejan Savićević

1 goal

- (Austria national football team) Leo Lainer
- (Austria national football team) Andreas Ogris
- (Austria national football team) Ernst Ogris
- (Austria national football team) Heimo Pfeifenberger
- (Austria national football team) Michael Streiter
- (Austria national football team) Arnold Wetl
- (Denmark national football team) Jan Bartram
- (Denmark national football team) Kim Christofte
- (Denmark national football team) Lars Elstrup
- (Denmark national football team) Frank Pingel
- (Denmark national football team) Kim Vilfort
- (Faroe Islands national football team) Allan Mørkøre
- (Faroe Islands national football team) Torkil Nielsen
- (Faroe Islands national football team) Kári Reynheim
- (Northern Ireland national football team) Kingsley Black
- (Northern Ireland national football team) Iain Dowie
- (Northern Ireland national football team) Colin Hill
- (Northern Ireland national football team) Alan McDonald
- (Northern Ireland national football team) Gerry Taggart
- (Northern Ireland national football team) Kevin Wilson
- (Yugoslavia national football team) Mehmed Baždarević
- (Yugoslavia national football team) Dragiša Binić
- (Yugoslavia national football team) Zvonimir Boban
- (Yugoslavia national football team) Robert Jarni
- (Yugoslavia national football team) Vladimir Jugović
- (Yugoslavia national football team) Srečko Katanec
- (Yugoslavia national football team) Vladan Lukić
- (Yugoslavia national football team) Ilija Najdoski
- (Yugoslavia national football team) Davor Šuker
- (Yugoslavia national football team) Zoran Vulić

1 own goal

- (Austria national football team) Peter Artner (against Denmark)
