= UEFA Euro 2016 qualifying Group F =

Football tournament qualifying stage

The UEFA Euro 2016 qualifying Group F was one of the nine groups to decide which teams would qualify for the UEFA Euro 2016 finals tournament. Group F consisted of six teams: Greece, Hungary, Romania, Finland, Northern Ireland, and Faroe Islands, where they played against each other home-and-away in a round-robin format.

The top two teams, Northern Ireland and Romania, qualified directly for the finals. As third-placed Hungary were not the highest-ranked among all third-placed teams, they advanced to the play-offs, where they won against Norway and thus qualified as well.

Group's qualified team Romania conceded the least goals from all the teams that played in the qualifications: only two goals were scored in Romania's net, both at home and on Arena Națională in Bucharest, against neighbours Hungary on October 11, 2014, and again against Finland one year later, on October 8, 2015. Greece, Euro 2004 winners, quarter-finalists at Euro 2012, and a team who played in the 2014 FIFA World Cup only three months before the group started, reaching the Round of 16, shockingly finished at the bottom of the group, scoring only 7 goals and conceding 14, losing twice against the Faroe Islands and having a single victory, a hard-obtained 4-3 victory over Hungary in Athens.

== Standings ==
Pos	Team	Pld	W	D	L	GF	GA	GD	Pts	Qualification	(Northern Ireland)	(Romania)	(Hungary)	(Finland)	(Faroe Islands)	(Greece)
1	Northern Ireland	10	6	3	1	16	8	+8	21	Qualify for final tournament	—	0–0	1–1	2–1	2–0	3–1
2	Romania	10	5	5	0	11	2	+9	20	Qualify for final tournament	2–0	—	1–1	1–1	1–0	0–0
3	Hungary	10	4	4	2	11	9	+2	16	Advance to play-offs	1–2	0–0	—	1–0	2–1	0–0
4	Finland	10	3	3	4	9	10	−1	12		1–1	0–2	0–1	—	1–0	1–1
5	Faroe Islands	10	2	0	8	6	17	−11	6 (Note: Head-to-head points: Faroe Islands 6, Greece 0.)		1–3	0–3	0–1	1–3	—	2–1
6	Greece	10	1	3	6	7	14	−7	6		0–2	0–1	4–3	0–1	0–1	—

Source: UEFA
Rules for classification: Qualification tiebreakers

== Matches ==
The fixtures were released by UEFA the same day as the draw, which was held on 23 February 2014 in Nice. Times are CET/CEST, (Note: CET (UTC+1) for matches on 14 November 2014, and CEST (UTC+2) for all other matches.) as listed by UEFA (local times are in parentheses).

7 September 2014
18:00
(18:00 UTC+2)

Hungary	1–2	Northern Ireland
Priskin 75'	Report	McGinn 81'; K. Lafferty 88'

Groupama Arena, Budapest
Attendance: 20,672
Referee: Deniz Aytekin (Germany)
7 September 2014
20:45
(19:45 UTC+1)

Faroe Islands	1–3	Finland
Holst 41'	Report	Riski 53', 78'; R. Eremenko 82'

Tórsvøllur, Tórshavn
Attendance: 3,300
Referee: Simon Lee Evans (Wales)
7 September 2014
20:45
(21:45 UTC+3)

Greece	0–1	Romania
	Report	Marica 10' (pen.)

Karaiskakis Stadium, Piraeus
Attendance: 0 (Note: Greece played their home match against Romania behind closed doors as they were punished for previous crowd disturbances.)
Referee: Mark Clattenburg (England)

11 October 2014
18:00
(19:00 UTC+3)

Romania	1–1	Hungary
Rusescu 45'	Report	Dzsudzsák 82'

Arena Națională, Bucharest
Attendance: 52,000
Referee: William Collum (Scotland)
11 October 2014
20:45
(21:45 UTC+3)

Finland	1–1	Greece
Hurme 55'	Report	Karelis 24'

Olympiastadion, Helsinki
Attendance: 26,548
Referee: David Fernández Borbalán (Spain)
11 October 2014
20:45
(19:45 UTC+1)

Northern Ireland	2–0	Faroe Islands
McAuley 6'; K. Lafferty 20'	Report

Windsor Park, Belfast
Attendance: 10,049
Referee: Alon Yefet (Israel)

14 October 2014
20:45
(19:45 UTC+1)

Faroe Islands	0–1	Hungary
	Report	Szalai 21'

Tórsvøllur, Tórshavn
Attendance: 2,000
Referee: Aleksei Kulbakov (Belarus)
14 October 2014
20:45
(21:45 UTC+3)

Finland	0–2	Romania
	Report	Stancu 54', 83'

Olympiastadion, Helsinki
Attendance: 19,408
Referee: Paolo Tagliavento (Italy)
14 October 2014
20:45
(21:45 UTC+3)

Greece	0–2	Northern Ireland
	Report	Ward 9'; K. Lafferty 51'

Karaiskakis Stadium, Piraeus
Attendance: 18,726
Referee: Stéphane Lannoy (France)

14 November 2014
20:45
(21:45 UTC+2)

Greece	0–1	Faroe Islands
	Report	Edmundsson 61'

Karaiskakis Stadium, Piraeus
Attendance: 16,821
Referee: Nicola Rizzoli (Italy)
14 November 2014
20:45
(20:45 UTC+1)

Hungary	1–0	Finland
Gera 84'	Report

Groupama Arena, Budapest
Attendance: 19,600
Referee: Clément Turpin (France)
14 November 2014
20:45
(21:45 UTC+2)

Romania	2–0	Northern Ireland
Papp 74', 79'	Report

Arena Națională, Bucharest
Attendance: 28,892
Referee: Jonas Eriksson (Sweden)

29 March 2015
18:00
(17:00 UTC+1)

Northern Ireland	2–1	Finland
K. Lafferty 33', 38'	Report	Sadik 90+1'

Windsor Park, Belfast
Attendance: 10,264
Referee: Szymon Marciniak (Poland)
29 March 2015
18:00
(19:00 UTC+3)

Romania	1–0	Faroe Islands
Keșerü 21'	Report

Ilie Oană Stadium, Ploiești
Attendance: 13,898
Referee: Artur Soares Dias (Portugal)
29 March 2015
20:45
(20:45 UTC+2)

Hungary	0–0	Greece
	Report

Groupama Arena, Budapest
Attendance: 22,000
Referee: Sergei Karasev (Russia)

13 June 2015
18:00
(19:00 UTC+3)

Finland	0–1	Hungary
	Report	Stieber 82'

Olympiastadion, Helsinki
Attendance: 20,434
Referee: Matej Jug (Slovenia)
13 June 2015
20:45
(19:45 UTC+1)

Faroe Islands	2–1	Greece
Hansson 32'; B. Olsen 70'	Report	Papastathopoulos 84'

Tórsvøllur, Tórshavn
Attendance: 4,731
Referee: Tom Harald Hagen (Norway)
13 June 2015
20:45
(19:45 UTC+1)

Northern Ireland	0–0	Romania
	Report

Windsor Park, Belfast
Attendance: 10,000
Referee: Carlos Velasco Carballo (Spain)

4 September 2015
20:45
(19:45 UTC+1)

Faroe Islands	1–3	Northern Ireland
Edmundsson 36'	Report	McAuley 12', 71'; K. Lafferty 75'

Tórsvøllur, Tórshavn
Attendance: 4,513
Referee: Felix Zwayer (Germany)
4 September 2015
20:45
(21:45 UTC+3)

Greece	0–1	Finland
	Report	Pohjanpalo 75'

Karaiskakis Stadium, Piraeus
Attendance: 17,358
Referee: Serhiy Boyko (Ukraine)
4 September 2015
20:45
(20:45 UTC+2)

Hungary	0–0	Romania
	Report

Groupama Arena, Budapest
Attendance: 22,060
Referee: Felix Brych (Germany)

7 September 2015
20:45
(21:45 UTC+3)

Finland	1–0	Faroe Islands
Pohjanpalo 23'	Report

Olympiastadion, Helsinki
Attendance: 9,477
Referee: Marcin Borski (Poland)
7 September 2015
20:45
(19:45 UTC+1)

Northern Ireland	1–1	Hungary
K. Lafferty 90+3'	Report	Guzmics 74'

Windsor Park, Belfast
Attendance: 10,200
Referee: Cüneyt Çakır (Turkey)
7 September 2015
20:45
(21:45 UTC+3)

Romania	0–0	Greece
	Report

Arena Națională, Bucharest
Attendance: 38,153
Referee: Aleksei Kulbakov (Belarus)

8 October 2015
20:45
(20:45 UTC+2)

Hungary	2–1	Faroe Islands
Böde 63', 71'	Report	Jakobsen 11'

Groupama Arena, Budapest
Attendance: 16,500
Referee: Robert Schörgenhofer (Austria)
8 October 2015
20:45
(19:45 UTC+1)

Northern Ireland	3–1	Greece
Davis 35', 58'; Magennis 49'	Report	Aravidis 87'

Windsor Park, Belfast
Attendance: 11,700
Referee: Bas Nijhuis (Netherlands)
8 October 2015
20:45
(21:45 UTC+3)

Romania	1–1	Finland
Hoban 90+1'	Report	Pohjanpalo 67'

Arena Națională, Bucharest
Attendance: 47,987
Referee: Craig Thomson (Scotland)

11 October 2015
18:00
(17:00 UTC+1)

Faroe Islands	0–3	Romania
	Report	Budescu 4', 45+1'; Maxim 83'

Tórsvøllur, Tórshavn
Attendance: 3,941
Referee: Ivan Kružliak (Slovakia)
11 October 2015
18:00
(19:00 UTC+3)

Finland	1–1	Northern Ireland
Arajuuri 87'	Report	Cathcart 31'

Olympiastadion, Helsinki
Attendance: 14,550
Referee: Sergei Karasev (Russia)
11 October 2015
18:00
(19:00 UTC+3)

Greece	4–3	Hungary
Stafylidis 5'; Tachtsidis 57'; Mitroglou 79'; Kone 86'	Report	Lovrencsics 26'; Németh 55', 75'

Karaiskakis Stadium, Piraeus
Attendance: 9,500
Referee: Ivan Bebek (Croatia)

== Goalscorers ==
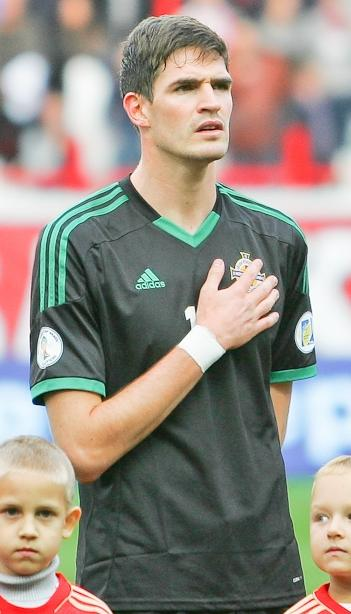
Northern Ireland's Kyle Lafferty was the group's leading goalscorer with seven goals

There were 60 goals scored in 30 matches, for an average of 2 goals per match.

7 goals

- (Northern Ireland national football team) Kyle Lafferty

3 goals

- (Finland national football team) Joel Pohjanpalo
- (Northern Ireland national football team) Gareth McAuley

2 goals

- (Faroe Islands national football team) Jóan Símun Edmundsson
- (Finland national football team) Riku Riski
- (Hungary national football team) Dániel Böde
- (Hungary national football team) Krisztián Németh
- (Northern Ireland national football team) Steven Davis
- (Romania national football team) Constantin Budescu
- (Romania national football team) Paul Papp
- (Romania national football team) Bogdan Stancu

1 goal

- (Faroe Islands national football team) Hallur Hansson
- (Faroe Islands national football team) Christian Holst
- (Faroe Islands national football team) Róaldur Jakobsen
- (Faroe Islands national football team) Brandur Olsen
- (Finland national football team) Paulus Arajuuri
- (Finland national football team) Roman Eremenko
- (Finland national football team) Jarkko Hurme
- (Finland national football team) Berat Sadik
- (Greece national football team) Christos Aravidis
- (Greece national football team) Nikos Karelis
- (Greece national football team) Panagiotis Kone
- (Greece national football team) Kostas Mitroglou
- (Greece national football team) Sokratis Papastathopoulos
- (Greece national football team) Kostas Stafylidis
- (Greece national football team) Panagiotis Tachtsidis
- (Hungary national football team) Balázs Dzsudzsák
- (Hungary national football team) Zoltán Gera
- (Hungary national football team) Richárd Guzmics
- (Hungary national football team) Gergő Lovrencsics
- (Hungary national football team) Tamás Priskin
- (Hungary national football team) Zoltán Stieber
- (Hungary national football team) Ádám Szalai
- (Northern Ireland national football team) Craig Cathcart
- (Northern Ireland national football team) Josh Magennis
- (Northern Ireland national football team) Niall McGinn
- (Northern Ireland national football team) Jamie Ward
- (Romania national football team) Ovidiu Hoban
- (Romania national football team) Claudiu Keșerü
- (Romania national football team) Ciprian Marica
- (Romania national football team) Alexandru Maxim
- (Romania national football team) Raul Rusescu

== Discipline ==
A player was automatically suspended for the next match for the following offences:

- Receiving a red card (red card suspensions could be extended for serious offences)
- Receiving three yellow cards in three different matches, as well as after fifth and any subsequent yellow card (yellow card suspensions were carried forward to the play-offs, but not the finals or any other future international matches)

The following suspensions were served during the qualifying matches:

Team	Player	Offence(s)	Suspended for match(es)
Faroe Islands	Hallur Hansson	(yellow card) vs Finland (7 September 2014); (yellow card) vs Hungary (14 October 2014); (yellow card) vs Greece (14 November 2014)	vs Romania (29 March 2015)
Faroe Islands	Hallur Hansson	(yellow card) vs Northern Ireland (4 September 2015); (yellow card) vs Finland (7 September 2015)	vs Hungary (8 October 2015)
Faroe Islands	Atli Gregersen	(yellow card) vs Hungary (14 October 2014); (yellow card) vs Greece (14 November 2014); (yellow card) vs Greece (13 June 2015)	vs Northern Ireland (4 September 2015)
Faroe Islands	Atli Gregersen	(yellow card) (yellow-red card) vs Hungary (8 October 2015)	vs Romania (11 October 2015)
Faroe Islands	Jóan Símun Edmundsson	(yellow card) (yellow-red card) vs Northern Ireland (4 September 2015)	vs Finland (7 September 2015)
Faroe Islands	Fróði Benjaminsen	(yellow card) vs Hungary (14 October 2014); (yellow card) vs Greece (13 June 2015); (yellow card) vs Finland (7 September 2015)	vs Hungary (8 October 2015)
Faroe Islands	Brandur Olsen	(yellow card) vs Greece (14 November 2014); (yellow card) vs Greece (13 June 2015); (yellow card) vs Finland (7 September 2015)	vs Hungary (8 October 2015)
Finland	Alexander Ring	(yellow card) (yellow-red card) vs Romania (14 October 2014)	vs Hungary (14 November 2014)
Finland	Tim Sparv	(yellow card) vs Greece (11 October 2014); (yellow card) vs Hungary (13 June 2015); (yellow card) vs Faroe Islands (7 September 2015)	vs Romania (8 October 2015)
Finland	Markus Halsti	(yellow card) vs Hungary (13 June 2015); (yellow card) vs Faroe Islands (7 September 2015); (yellow card) vs Romania (8 October 2015)	vs Northern Ireland (11 October 2015)
Finland	Përparim Hetemaj	(yellow card) vs Faroe Islands (7 September 2014); (yellow card) vs Greece (11 October 2014); (yellow card) vs Romania (8 October 2015)	vs Northern Ireland (11 October 2015)
Greece	Vasilis Torosidis	(yellow card) vs Romania (7 September 2014); (yellow card) vs Finland (11 October 2014); (yellow card) vs Faroe Islands (13 June 2015)	vs Finland (4 September 2015)
Greece	Kostas Manolas	(yellow card) vs Romania (7 September 2014); (yellow card) vs Faroe Islands (14 November 2014); (yellow card) vs Romania (7 September 2015)	vs Northern Ireland (8 October 2015)
Hungary	Ákos Elek	(yellow card) vs Romania (11 October 2014); (yellow card) vs Finland (14 November 2014); (yellow card) vs Greece (29 March 2015)	vs Finland (13 June 2015)
Hungary	Zoltán Gera	(yellow card) vs Romania (11 October 2014); (yellow card) vs Faroe Islands (14 October 2014); (yellow card) vs Finland (13 June 2015)	vs Romania (4 September 2015)
Hungary	Dániel Tőzsér	(yellow card) vs Romania (11 October 2014); (yellow card) vs Finland (14 November 2014); (yellow card) vs Romania (4 September 2015)	vs Northern Ireland (7 September 2015)
Hungary	Leandro	(yellow card) vs Greece (29 March 2015); (yellow card) vs Romania (4 September 2015); (yellow card) vs Northern Ireland (7 September 2015)	vs Faroe Islands (8 October 2015)
Northern Ireland	Jonny Evans	(red card) vs Azerbaijan (11 October 2013) (Note: The suspension was carried over from the 2014 FIFA World Cup qualification.)	vs Hungary (7 September 2014)
Northern Ireland	Chris Baird	(yellow card) (yellow-red card) vs Hungary (7 September 2015)	vs Greece (8 October 2015)
Northern Ireland	Kyle Lafferty	(yellow card) vs Greece (14 October 2014); (yellow card) vs Romania (14 November 2014); (yellow card) vs Hungary (7 September 2015)	vs Greece (8 October 2015)
Northern Ireland	Conor McLaughlin	(yellow card) vs Romania (14 November 2014); (yellow card) vs Faroe Islands (4 September 2015); (yellow card) vs Hungary (7 September 2015)	vs Greece (8 October 2015)
Romania	Ciprian Marica	(yellow card) (yellow-red card) vs Greece (7 September 2014)	vs Hungary (11 October 2014)
Romania	Mihai Pintilii	(yellow card) vs Greece (7 September 2014); (yellow card) vs Northern Ireland (14 November 2014); (yellow card) vs Northern Ireland (13 June 2015)	vs Hungary (4 September 2015)
Romania	Alexandru Chipciu	(yellow card) vs Hungary (11 October 2014); (yellow card) vs Northern Ireland (14 November 2014); (yellow card) vs Hungary (4 September 2015)	vs Greece (7 September 2015)
