= Allan Mørkøre =

Faroese footballer and manager (born 1971)

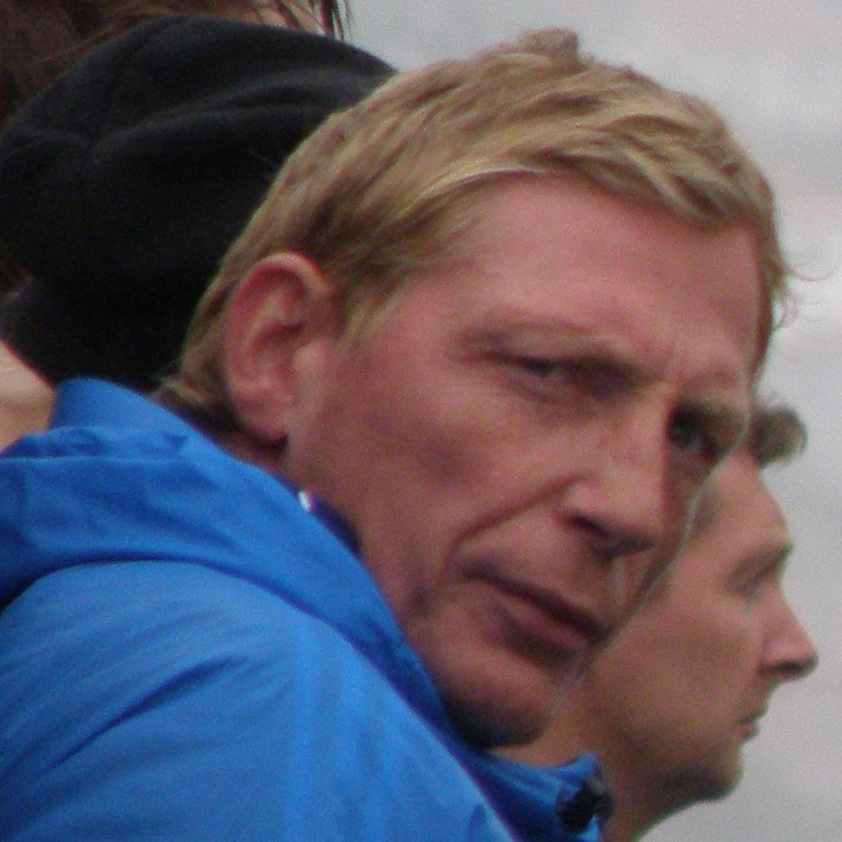

Personal information
- Date of birth: 22 November 1971 (age 54)
- Place of birth: Faroe Islands
- Height: 1.86 m (6 ft 1 in)
- Position: Midfielder

Team information
- Current team: B71 Sandoy

Senior career*
Years	Team	Apps	(Gls)
1988–1993	KÍ Klaksvík	82	(10)
1994	B36 Tórshavn	10	(4)
1994–1997	KÍ	41	(14)
1997–1999	HB Tórshavn	30	(23)
1999–2000	ÍBV Vestmannaeyjar	22	(4)
2000–2001	HB	23	(9)
2002	KÍ	17	(2)
2003–2005	B36	60	(17)
2006	AB	20	(19)
2007	B36	8	(1)
2007–2010	AB	32	(14)
2010	B36	0	(0)
2011	FC Hoyvík	1	(0)
2012	Giza Hoyvik	12	(1)
2013	B71 Sandoy	11	(3)
2014–2016	B36	0	(0)

International career^{‡}
1990–2001	Faroe Islands	54	(1)

Managerial career
- 2008–10: AB
- 2010: B36
- 2011: FC Hoyvík
- 2012–present.: B71 Sandoy
- * Club domestic league appearances and goals as of 23 September 2010 ‡ National team caps and goals as of 18 October 2007

Allan Mørkøre (born 22 November 1971) is a Faroese former professional football midfielder. Now he is a manager for B71 Sandoy, which plays in the men's second best division. He was manager for AB from 2008 to 2010, he replaced Sigfríður Clementsen, who is currently the manager for HB. In 2010, he became manager of B36 Tórshavn. Mørkøre is now assisting coach for FC Hoyvík, which plays in the second best Faroese football division 1. deild. Allan Mørkøre is the younger brother of fellow Faroese international Kurt Mørkøre.

== Club career ==
A strong midfielder and header of the ball, Mørkøre started his career at Faroese club KÍ Klaksvík. He also played for Tórshavn sides HB and B36 and in the Icelandic League with ÍBV. Later, he played for AB Argir while also managing the team. Today he plays in FC Hoyvík in 1. deild, where he also serves as assistant manager.

== International career ==
Mørkøre made his international debut for the Faroe Islands in the famous shock defeat of Austria in a September 1990, at a European championship qualifying match, which was the country's debut in official international competition. His final match was a June 2001 World Cup qualifying match against Yugoslavia, coming on as a substitute for Julian Johnsson. He earned 54 caps, scoring 1 goal. He is the fifth most capped player for the Faroe Islands national side.

== International goals ==
Scores and results list Faroe Islands' goal tally first.

#	Date	Venue	Opponent	Score	Result	Competition
1	10 October 1990	Idrætsparken, Copenhagen, Denmark	Denmark	1–1	1–4	UEFA Euro 1992 qualifying
