= Lee Wilkie =

Scottish footballer (born 1980)

Personal information
- Full name: Lee Wilkie
- Date of birth: 20 April 1980 (age 46)
- Place of birth: Dundee, Scotland
- Position: Centre-back

Senior career*
Years	Team	Apps	(Gls)
1998–2006	Dundee	111	(4)
2001	→ Plymouth Argyle (loan)	2	(0)
2001	→ Notts County (loan)	2	(0)
2001–2002	→ Falkirk (loan)	9	(2)
2006–2010	Dundee United	81	(8)
2006–2007	→ Ross County (loan)	4	(0)
Total		209	(14)

International career
1999–2000	Scotland under-21	8	(0)
2002–2003	Scotland	11	(1)
2003	Scotland B	1	(0)
- * Club domestic league appearances and goals

Lee Wilkie (born 20 April 1980) is a Scottish former professional footballer, who played as a central defender. He spent the majority of his career in Dundee, playing for both Dundee and Dundee United. Wilkie started his career with Dundee, making over 100 appearances in the Scottish Premier League. He won 11 Scotland international caps between 2002 and 2003, during the tenure of Berti Vogts. Soon after this he suffered from a series of knee injuries, which led to Wilkie being released by Dundee in August 2006. Wilkie then signed for Dundee United and he again played regularly for a while, but ongoing knee problems forced his retirement from professional football in April 2010.

== Club career ==
Wilkie had been with city rivals Dundee for his entire professional career, having ended his contract with them in August 2006. During his time at Dens Park, he had short loan spells in England with Plymouth Argyle and Notts County, plus nine games with Falkirk.

Wilkie suffered serious anterior cruciate ligament injuries in January 2004 (ironically, against United) and in April 2005, which left him without the ligament. Unable to receive an operation, he hoped to continue playing professional football by strengthening the knee muscles to compensate for the lack of ligament.

Despite interest from other clubs, Wilkie announced his intention to give first option on a contract to the team he has supported all his life, Dundee United. In October 2006, it was announced that Dundee United would offer Wilkie a 'pay as you play' contract, with Wilkie's signing confirmed on 10 October 2006.

In early-November 2006, new manager Craig Levein stated his intention to send Wilkie out on loan for "about a month", feeling he was "not ready to play first-team matches at this [SPL] level." Subsequently, in December 2006, Lee joined Scottish First Division side Ross County on a one-month loan deal.

Following his spell at Ross County, Wilkie returned to Dundee United and played in a 1–0 defeat to Kilmarnock at Rugby Park on 20 January 2007. After the match, Wilkie cast doubt on his future at Tannadice by expressing doubts over his ability to play in the SPL due to his ongoing injury and fitness issues, and stated he will review his situation in the near future. Wilkie, like defensive colleagues David McCracken and Lee Mair, was to be out of contract at the end of 2006–07, but signed a two-year deal in March 2007 to take him to summer 2009.

On 1 February 2008, following Barry Robson's move to Celtic, Wilkie was named captain; six weeks later, he led the team out at Hampden Park for the 2008 Scottish League Cup Final, where he was one of three players to miss a penalty in the defeat to Rangers.

In January 2009 Wilkie signed a new three-year contract until May 2012 but announced his retirement on 3 April 2010 due to ongoing knee problems.

== International career ==
Prior to his injury problems, Wilkie was a regular in the Scottish national team. He was given his international debut by Berti Vogts, in a Reunification Cup match against South Africa in May 2002. His only international goal secured a 2–1 victory over Iceland at Hampden in March 2003. Wilkie's last international appearance was an unhappy experience, as the Scots suffered a 6–0 defeat against the Netherlands in November 2003 that ended their hopes of reaching UEFA Euro 2004.

Wilkie was offered a return to international football in November 2007 through the Scotland B team, but he declined selection because he needed more games to be ready to compete at international level. After playing regularly for the whole of season 2007–08 and completing pre-season training for 2008–09 without any serious injury problems, Wilkie said he wanted to be selected. A recall never came, however, leaving him with a total of 11 caps.

== Managerial career ==
After retiring from his playing career, Wilkie joined Premier Sports Management as a client manager. He became assistant manager of Montrose in the summer of 2012 but left the following May because of family and other work commitments.

== Career statistics ==
=== Club ===
Appearances and goals by club, season and competition
Club	Season	League		National cup		League cup		Europe		Others		Total	
Club	Season	Apps	Goals	Apps	Goals	Apps	Goals	Apps	Goals	Apps	Goals	Apps	Goals
Dundee	1999–2000	23	0	2	0	1	0	0	0	0	0	26	0
Dundee	2000–01	9	0	0	0	2	0	0	0	0	0	11	0
Dundee	2001–02	8	0	0	0	0	0	2	0	0	0	10	0
Dundee	Total	40	0	2	0	3	0	2	0	0	0	47	0
Plymouth Argyle (loan)	2000–01	2	0	0	0	0	0	0	0	0	0	2	0
Notts County (loan)	2001–02	2	0	0	0	0	0	0	0	0	0	2	0
Falkirk (loan)	2001–02	9	2	0	0	0	0	0	0	0	0	9	2
Dundee United	2002–03	35	2	5	0	2	0	0	0	0	0	42	2
Dundee United	2003–04	21	1	2	0	2	1	4	0	0	0	29	2
Dundee United	2004–05	12	0	1	0	0	0	0	0	0	0	13	0
Dundee United	2005–06	2	1	1	0	0	0	0	0	0	0	3	1
Dundee United	2006–07	33	1	0	0	2	0	0	0	0	0	35	1
Dundee United	2007–08	29	3	3	0	4	1	0	0	2	0	36	4
Dundee United	Total	132	8	12	0	10	2	4	0	2	0	160	10
Ross County (loan)	2006–07	2	0	0	0	0	0	0	0	0	0	2	0
Career total		187	10	14	0	13	2	6	0	2	0	222	12

=== International ===
Appearances and goals by national team and year
National team	Year	Apps	Goals
Scotland	2002	5	0
Scotland	2003	6	1
Total		11	1

Score and result list Scotland's goal tally first, score column indicates score after Wilkie goal.

International goal scored by Lee Wilkie
No.	Date	Venue	Opponent	Score	Result	Competition
1	29 March 2003	Hampden Park, Glasgow, Scotland	Iceland	2–1	2–1	UEFA Euro 2004 qualifying Group 5

== Honours ==
Dundee

- Scottish Cup runner-up: 2002–03

Dundee United

- Scottish League Cup runner-up: 2007–08
- Scottish Premier League Player of the Month: October 2007
