= Michael Streiter =

Austrian footballer (born 1966)

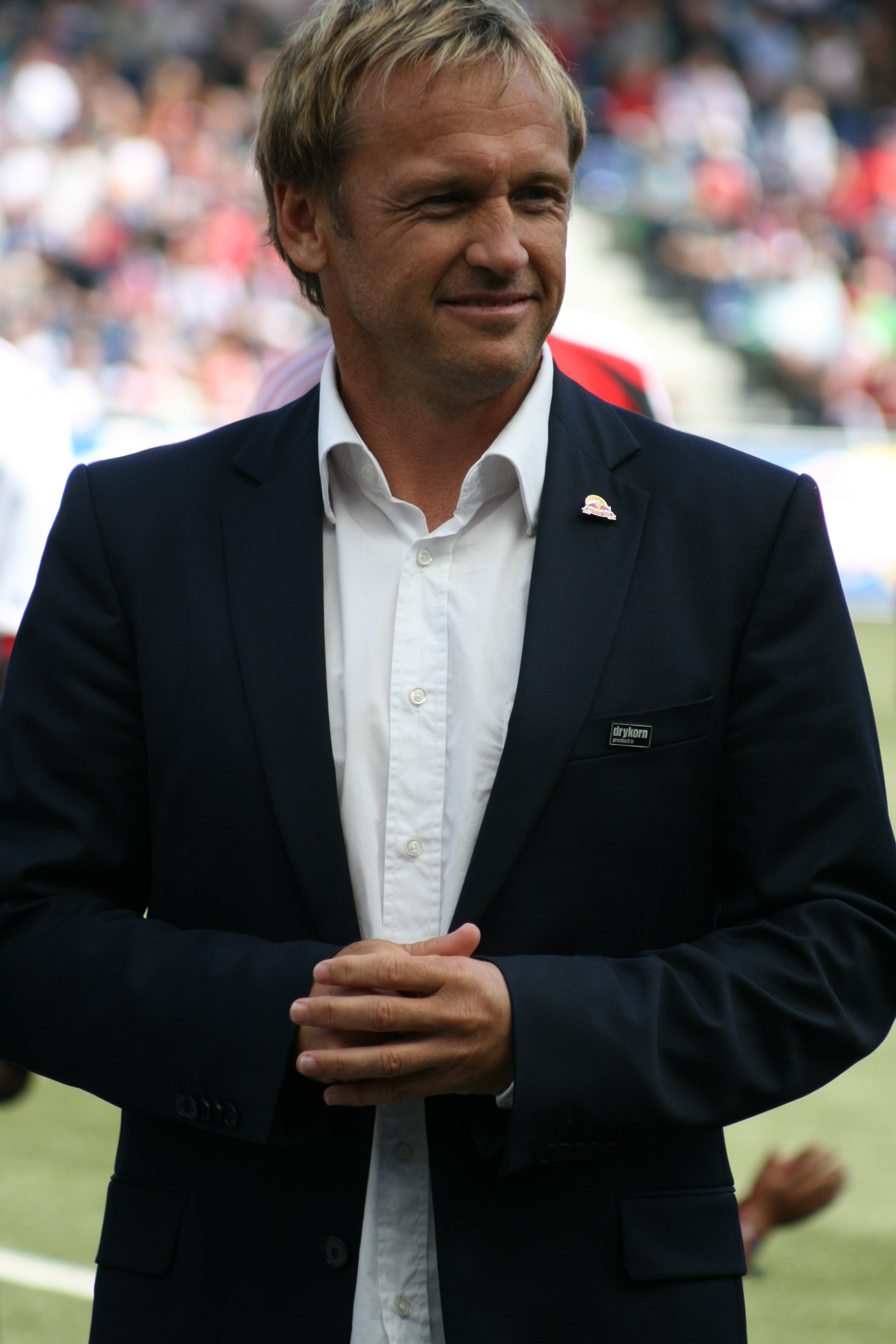

Personal information
- Date of birth: 19 January 1966 (age 60)
- Place of birth: Hall in Tirol, Austria
- Height: 1.75 m (5 ft 9 in)
- Position: Sweeper

Youth career
- SV Volders

Senior career*
Years	Team	Apps	(Gls)
1983–1986	FC Wacker Innsbruck	66	(2)
1986–1992	FC Swarovski Tirol	160	(1)
1992–1993	FC Wacker Innsbruck	29	(1)
1993–1997	FC Tirol Innsbruck	122	(10)
1997–2000	Austria Wien	74	(4)
2000	FC Tirol Innsbruck	1	(0)
2001	WSG Wattens		
Total		452	(18)

International career
1989–1999	Austria	34	(1)

Managerial career
- 2002–2003: FC Wacker Tirol
- 2005–2007: SCR Altach
- 2007–2008: Red Bull Salzburg Amateure
- 2010: FC Raika Volders
- 2010–2013: SV Horn
- 2013–2014: FC Wacker Innsbruck
- * Club domestic league appearances and goals

Michael Streiter (born 19 January 1966) is an Austrian former football player and coach.

== Club career ==
Streiter was born in Hall in Tirol. A rather short sweeper, he made his professional debut at 17 years of age with FC Wacker Innsbruck in the 1983–84 season. He stayed in Innsbruck for 14 years, also playing for FC Swarovski Tirol and FC Tirol Innsbruck. In 1997, he moved to Vienna side Austria Wien.

== International career ==
Streiter made his debut for Austria in August 1989 against Iceland and was a participant at the 1990 FIFA World Cup. He earned 34 caps, scoring one goal. His final international game was a September 1999 European Championship qualification match against Spain.

== Coaching career ==
Streiter was trainer at SV Horn in the season 2012–13.

Streiter became head coach of Wacker Innsbruck on 27 December 2013.

== Career statistics ==
Scores and results list Austria's goal tally first.

#	Date	Venue	Opponent	Score	Result	Competition
1.	22 May 1991	Stadion Lehen, Salzburg	Faroe Islands	2–0	3–0	Euro 1992 qualifier

== Honours ==
- Austrian Football Bundesliga: 1989, 1990
- Austrian Cup: 1989, 1993
