= Jónas Tór Næs =

Faroese footballer (born 1986)

Jónas Þór Næs
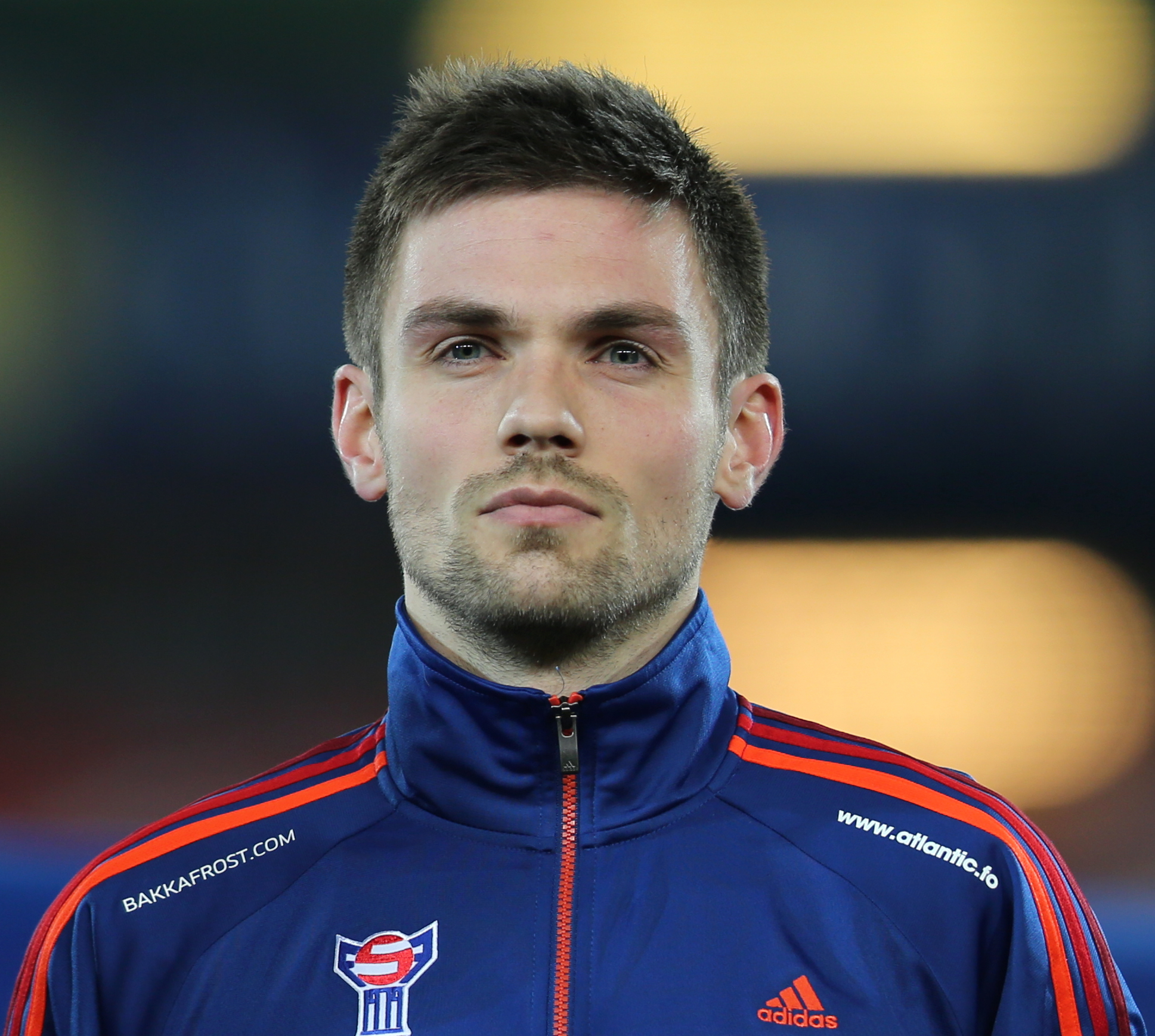
- Jónas Þór Næs (2013)

Personal information
- Date of birth: 27 December 1986 (age 39)
- Place of birth: Tórshavn, Faroe Islands
- Height: 1.77 m (5 ft 9 1/2 in)
- Position: Defender

Team information
- Current team: B36 (U11 head coach)

Senior career*
Years	Team	Apps	(Gls)
2004–2006	BK Frem	28	(0)
2006–2007	Fremad Amager	10	(0)
2007	Argja Bóltfelag	11	(0)
2007–2008	Køge BK	11	(0)
2008	NSÍ Runavík	13	(0)
2009–2010	BK Frem	10	(0)
2010	B36	13	(0)
2011–2013	Valur	51	(1)
2014	EB/Streymur	29	(0)
2015–2016	B36	37	(0)
2017–2018	ÍBV	19	(0)
2018–2019	B36	31	(2)

International career
2001–2002	Faroe Islands U17	12	(0)
2003–2004	Faroe Islands U19	6	(0)
2007	Faroe Islands U21	7	(0)
2008–2019	Faroe Islands	57	(0)

Managerial career
- 2019: B36 (U9)
- 2020–: B36 (U11)
- * Club domestic league appearances and goals

Jónas Þór Næs (born 27 December 1986) is a Faroese retired international footballer.

He played professionally for BK Frem in 2005-06 and again 2009–10. Næs previously played for Valur (2011–13), Fremad Amager (2007–08), Køge BK (2008–09), Argja Bóltfelag (2007), NSÍ Runavík (2008) and B36 (2013–16).

== Career ==
=== Club career ===
In November 2010 he signed a two-year contract with Icelandic club Valur.

In December 2016 he signed a contract with Icelandic club ÍBV.

He made his international debut for the Faroe Islands in 2008.

=== Coaching career ===
Retiring at the end of 2019, he continued as a youth coach at B36. Næs already worked as a coach for the club's U9 team in the 2019 season alongside his football career.
