= Jens Kristian Hansen =

Faroese footballer (born 1971)

Personal information
- Date of birth: 3 September 1971 (age 55)
- Place of birth: Faroe Islands
- Height: 1.87 m (6 ft 2 in)
- Positions: Defender; midfielder

Senior career*
Years	Team	Apps	(Gls)
1992–1993	B36 Tórshavn	20	(10)
1994–1995	Freja Randers		
1995–2004	B36	133	(31)
1999–2000	→ Ayr United (loan)	8	(2)

International career
1994–2002	Faroe Islands	44	(3)
- * Club domestic league appearances and goals

Jens Kristian Hansen (born 3 September 1971) is a Faroese former football defender or midfielder. He spent most of his career in B36 Tórshavn, while he also had spells with Freja Randers in Denmark, and Ayr United in Scotland. He has been capped for the Faroe Islands at senior level.

== Club career ==
He started and played most of his career at Faroese club B36 and also played for Danish side Randers Freja and in Scotland for Ayr United, where he teamed up shortly alongside compatriot Jens Martin Knudsen.

== International career ==
Hansen made his debut in a September 1994 European championship qualifying match against Greece. His final international match was the famous October 2002 1–2 loss against Germany in Hanover. He earned 44 caps, scoring three goals.

== International goals ==
Scores and results list Faroe Islands' goal tally first.

#	Date	Venue	Opponent	Score	Result	Competition
1	25 May 1995	Svangaskarð, Toftir, Faroe Islands	San Marino	1–0	3–0	Euro 1996 Qualifying
2	11 October 1997	El Molinón, Gijón, Spain	Spain	1–2	1–3	1998 WC Qualifying
3	1 September 2001	Svangaskarð, Toftir, Faroe Islands	Luxembourg	1–0	1–0	2002 WC Qualifying
