= Todi Jónsson =

Faroese footballer (born 1972)

Personal information
- Full name: Todi Adam Jónsson
- Date of birth: 2 February 1972 (age 54)
- Place of birth: Vejle, Denmark
- Height: 1.80 m (5 ft 11 in)
- Position: Striker

Team information
- Current team: Frederikssund IK (Manager)

Youth career
- KÍ Klaksvík
- Lyseng
- AGF

Senior career*
Years	Team	Apps	(Gls)
1989–1992	KÍ	50	(18)
1993	B36	10	(3)
1994–1997	Lyngby	76	(18)
1997–2005	Copenhagen	167	(54)
2005–2006	Start	36	(4)
2007	FC Amager	7	(0)
2009	KÍ	8	(1)
Total		338	(93)

International career
1991–2005	Faroe Islands	45	(9)

Managerial career
- 2008–2009: FC Amager (sporting director)
- 2022: NSÍ Runavík
- 2022–: Frederikssund IK
- * Club domestic league appearances and goals

Todi Adam Jónsson (born 2 February 1972) is a Faroese former professional footballer who played as a striker for Danish premier league clubs Lyngby FC and FC Copenhagen, Norwegian club Start and Danish club Fremad Amager. He started and ended his football career at Faroese side KÍ Klaksvík.

He has played 45 matches for Faroe Islands national football team and is currently (2018) number two on the top goal scorer's list with 9 goals. Jónsson is the highest scoring foreign football player in the Danish Superliga (Premier League) with 72 goals. He was previously the all-time top scorer for FC København together with Lars Højer Nielsen, they both scored 54 goals for FCK, but they have later been surpassed by Cesar Santin and Dame N'Doye.

== Club career ==
Jónsson spent a large portion of his career at the Danish Superliga side FC Copenhagen, having arrived in 1997 from Lyngby BK together with the new CEO Flemming Østergaard. Todi, as he is known by the FC Copenhagen fans, is one of the all-time leading goal scorers for the club and a member of the Hall of Fame as decided by fan club voting. From 1997 to 2005 he played 207 matches for FC Copenhagen and scored 68 goals.

On 25 June 2009, it was announced that Jónsson had rejoined KÍ Klaksvík, who, however, were unable to maintain their place in the Faroese top division. He ended his football career with the club where he started. He played his last match for KÍ Klaksvík on 3 October 2009 against EB/Streymur.

== International career ==
In the Faroe Islands, Jónsson is arguably the most successful football player of all time, having played at an internationally high level for the better part of a decade with the Danish Champions FC Copenhagen. Furthermore, Todi was the most successful goalscorer for the Faroe Islands national football team with 9 goals in 45 caps, until Rógvi Jacobsen scored his 9th goal against Lithuania in September 2007, then fully overtaking Todi's record away to Italy two months later. Todi is also the only Faroese player to score a hat-trick in an international match. (Bergur Magnussen scored 6 times in the match against the Åland Islands back in 1989, but this match is not officially recognised.)

Todi is remembered for his premature and controversial international retirement in the spring of 2001, as he decided to concentrate fully on his club career. After that he won only two more caps, both in 2005.

== Career statistics ==
Scores and results list Faroe Islands' goal tally first, score column indicates score after each Jónsson goal.

List of international goals scored by Todi Jónsson
No.	Date	Venue	Opponent	Score	Result	Competition
1	15 July 1991	Gundadalur, Tórshavn, Faroe Islands	Turkey	1–0	1–1	Friendly
2	6 September 1995	Svangaskarð, Toftir, Faroe Islands	Russia	2–1	2–5	UEFA Euro 1996 qualifying
3	11 October 1995	Stadio Olimpico, Serravalle, San Marino	San Marino	1–0	3–1	UEFA Euro 1996 qualifying
4	11 October 1995	Stadio Olimpico, Serravalle, San Marino	San Marino	2–0	3–1	UEFA Euro 1996 qualifying
5	11 October 1995	Stadio Olimpico, Serravalle, San Marino	San Marino	3–1	3–1	UEFA Euro 1996 qualifying
6	4 September 1996	Svangaskarð, Toftir, Faroe Islands	Spain	1–1	2–6	1998 FIFA World Cup qualification
7	30 April 1997	Ta' Qali Stadium, Ta' Qali, Malta	Malta	2–1	2–1	1998 FIFA World Cup qualification
8	8 June 1997	Svangaskarð, Toftir, Faroe Islands	Malta	2–0	2–1	1998 FIFA World Cup qualification
9	4 February 2000	La Manga, Spain	Iceland	2–0	2–3	Friendly

== Honours ==
KÍ Klaksvík

- Faroe Islands Premier League: 1991

FC Copenhagen

- Danish Superliga: 2000–01, 2002–03, 2003–04
- Danish Cup: 2003–04
- Danish Super Cup: 2001, 2004
