= Brandur Hendriksson =

Faroese footballer (born 1995)

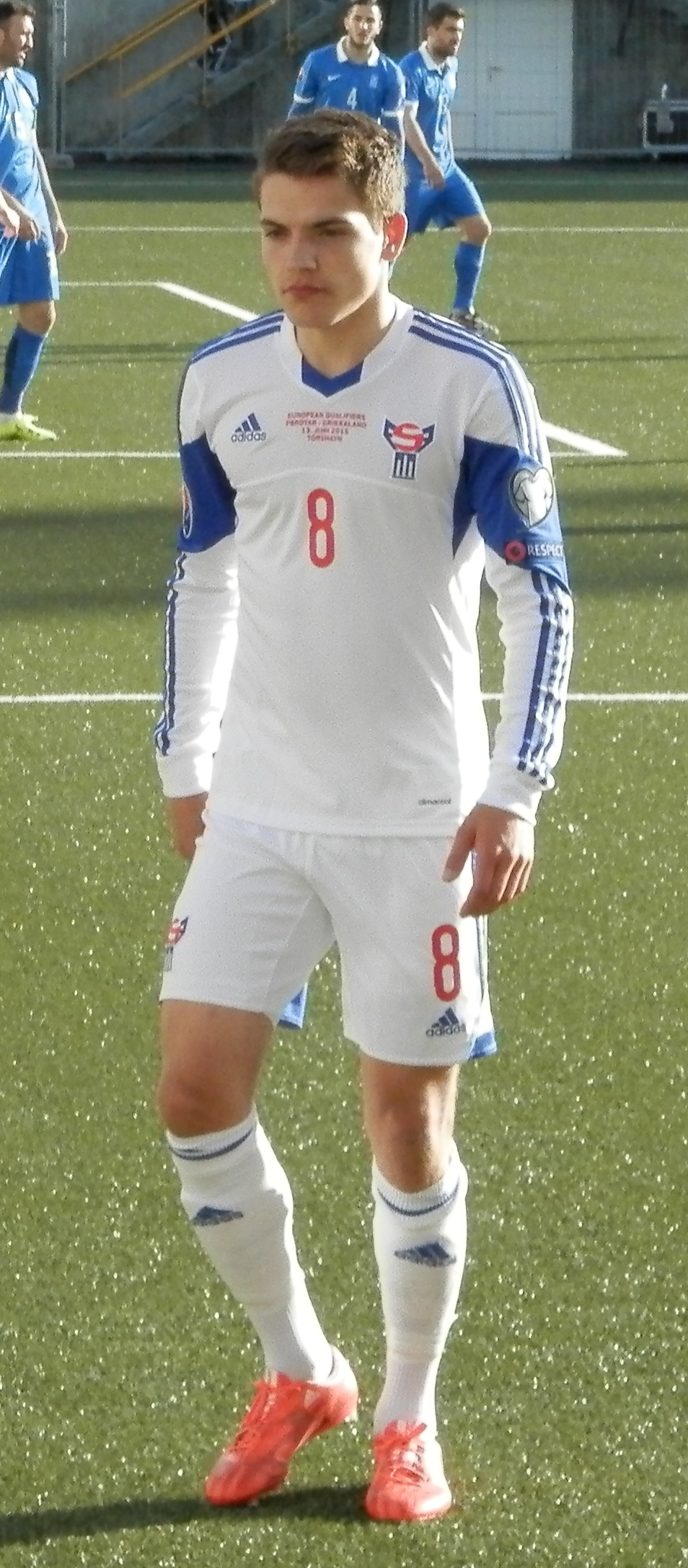
- Hendriksson in 2015

Personal information
- Full name: Brandur Hendriksson Olsen
- Date of birth: 19 December 1995 (age 30)
- Place of birth: Skálavík, Faroe Islands
- Height: 1.78 m (5 ft 10 in)
- Position: Midfielder

Team information
- Current team: NSÍ Runavík
- Number: 8

Youth career
- –2011: B71 Sandoy
- 2011–2014: Copenhagen

Senior career*
| Years | Team | Apps | (Gls) |
| 2014–2016 | Copenhagen | 8 | (2) |
| 2016 | → Vendsyssel FF (loan) | 11 | (0) |
| 2016–2018 | Randers | 9 | (1) |
| 2018–2019 | FH | 39 | (13) |
| 2020–2022 | Helsingborgs IF | 53 | (6) |
| 2023–2025 | Fredrikstad | 39 | (3) |
| 2025– | NSÍ Runavík | 32 | (11) |

International career^{‡}
| 2010–2011 | Faroe Islands U17 | 10 | (0) |
| 2010–2013 | Faroe Islands U19 | 6 | (0) |
| 2013– | Faroe Islands U21 | 4 | (0) |
| 2014– | Faroe Islands | 71 | (6) |
- * Club domestic league appearances and goals as of 2 June 2026 ‡ National team caps and goals as of 18:00, 12 October 2025 (UTC)

Brandur Hendriksson Olsen (born 19 December 1995) is a Faroese professional footballer who plays as a midfielder for Faroe Islands Premier League club NSI Runavik and the Faroe Islands national team.

== Name ==
Since "Olsen" is a very common surname in Denmark, he is referred to by various sources as "Brandur Olsen". However, his personal preference is "Hendriksson" as a testament to the pride he has of the Faroe Islands. He also wanted to make his father proud, as his father's first name is Hendrik.

== Club career ==
=== FC Copenhagen ===
In September 2014, after some impressive performances while captaining the reserves, Hendriksson signed professional terms with FC Copenhagen and was given squad number 36. Hendriksson was included in the matchday squad for the first time for the Danish Superliga home match against FC Midtjylland on 15 August 2014, although he remained on the bench. On 30 October 2014 he made his first team debut for F.C. Copenhagen in the cup match against FC Roskilde.

On 13 April 2015, Olsen made his first appearance for F.C. Copenhagen in the Danish Superliga, coming in as a substitute in an away win against Silkeborg. On 14 May 2015, Hendriksson scored the winning goal for F.C. Copenhagen in a 3–2 extra-time win against FC Vestsjælland in the 2014–15 Danish Cup Final, after coming off the bench in the 84th minute. Two weeks later Hendriksson scored the winning goal again from a freekick in a 1–0 win against Odense Boldklub, which secured F.C. Copenhagen a second-placed finish in the Danish league.

=== Vendsyssel FF ===
On 22 December 2015 it was confirmed, that Olsen, who struggled with gaining playing time in Copenhagen, had signed a loan contract for the rest of the season with the Danish 1st Division-club, Vendsyssel FF.

=== Randers FC ===
In July 2016, Hendriksson signed a three-year deal with Danish Superliga club Randers FC. Making him the third Faroese player to sign for a Danish top division team in 2016, after his former Vendsyssel FF teammate Hallur Hansson was signed by AC Horsens and Jóan Símun Edmundsson was signed by Odense Boldklub

=== FH ===
On 21 April 2018, Hendriksson immediately joined Icelandic club FH.

=== Helsingborgs ===
Hendriksson joined Swedish club Helsingborgs IF on 28 December 2019. With this, he became the first Faroese player to play in the Allsvenskan, and would be joined by national teammate Viljormur Davidsen in 2022.

=== Fredrikstad ===
On 17 January 2023 Hendriksson signed for Fredrikstad FK, managed by compatriot Mikkjal Thomassen. He was a part of their Norwegian Cup-winning team in their 2024 season, scoring a penalty in the final's penalty shootout, and played a crucial role in their promotion to the Eliteserien in 2023.

=== NSI ===
On 4 January 2025 Hendriksson left Fredrikstad for NSÍ Runavík. This is the first time Hendriksson will play in the Faroe Islands, having left boyhood club B71 Sandoy for F.C. Copenhagen in 2011 before making his competitive debut.

== International career ==
Hendriksson, described by several figures in the game as one of the brightest prospects of the Faroe Islands in recent years, made his full international debut for the Faroe Islands national football team on 11 October 2014, coming off the bench in the second half of the UEFA Euro 2016 qualifier against Northern Ireland at Windsor Park. On 14 October 2014, he was in the starting line up for the Euro qualifier against Hungary at Tórsvøllur, the Faroe Islands national football stadium. Playing in the number 10 role, Hendriksson impressed with his range of passing, his creative ability and his general high energy performance. He played the full 90 minutes and afterwards received very positive reviews from the Faroese media.

On 13 June 2015, Hendriksson scored his first international goal in a 2–1 win over former European champions Greece.

== Personal life ==
Hendriksson started an apprenticeship as a carpenter while also playing football.

== Career statistics ==
=== Club ===
As of 7 December 2024

Appearances and goals by club, season and competition
| Club | Season | League | | | National cup (Note: Includes Danish Cup, Icelandic Cup, Svenska Cupen, Norwegian Cup) | | Continental | | Other | | Total | | | |
| Club | Season | Club | Season | Division | Apps | Goals | Apps | Goals | Apps | Goals | Apps | Goals | Apps | Goals |
|---|---|---|---|---|---|---|---|---|---|---|---|---|---|---|
| Copenhagen | 2014–15 | Danish Superliga | 7 | 2 | 3 | 1 | 1 (Note: Appearance(s) in UEFA Europa League) | 0 | — | | 11 | 3 | | |
| Copenhagen | 2015–16 | Danish Superliga | 1 | 0 | 0 | 0 | 2 | 0 | — | | 3 | 0 | | |
| Copenhagen | Total | | 8 | 2 | 3 | 1 | 3 | 0 | — | | 14 | 3 | | |
| Vendsyssel FF (loan) | 2015–16 | 1. Division | 11 | 0 | — | | — | | — | | 11 | 0 | | |
| Randers | 2016–17 | Danish Superliga | 5 | 1 | 0 | 0 | — | | — | | 5 | 1 | | |
| Randers | 2017–18 | Danish Superliga | 4 | 0 | — | | — | | — | | 4 | 0 | | |
| Randers | Total | | 9 | 1 | 0 | 0 | — | | — | | 9 | 1 | | |
| FH | 2018 | Úrvalsdeild | 20 | 6 | 4 | 2 | 4 | 0 | — | | 28 | 8 | | |
| FH | 2019 | Úrvalsdeild | 18 | 6 | 5 | 1 | — | | — | | 23 | 7 | | |
| FH | Total | | 38 | 12 | 9 | 3 | 4 | 0 | — | | 51 | 15 | | |
| Helsingborgs IF | 2020 | Allsvenskan | 24 | 2 | 1 | 0 | — | | — | | 25 | 2 | | |
| Helsingborgs IF | 2021 | Superettan | 29 | 4 | 2 | 0 | — | | 2 (Note: Appearance(s) in Promotion/Relegation play-offs) | 0 | 33 | 4 | | |
| Helsingborgs IF | 2022 | Allsvenskan | 0 | 0 | 0 | 0 | — | | — | | 0 | 0 | | |
| Helsingborgs IF | Total | | 53 | 6 | 3 | 0 | — | | 2 | 0 | 58 | 6 | | |
| Fredrikstad | 2023 | 1. divisjon | 19 | 3 | — | | — | | — | | 19 | 3 | | |
| Fredrikstad | 2024 | Eliteserien | 20 | 0 | 6 | 5 | — | | — | | 26 | 5 | | |
| Fredrikstad | Total | | 39 | 3 | 6 | 5 | — | | — | | 45 | 8 | | |
| Career total | | | 158 | 24 | 21 | 9 | 7 | 0 | 2 | 0 | 188 | 33 | | |

=== International ===
Scores and results list Faroe Islands' goal tally first, score column indicates score after each Hendriksson goal.

List of international goals scored by Brandur Hendriksson
| No. | Date | Venue | Opponent | Score | Result | Competition |
|---|---|---|---|---|---|---|
| 1 | 13 June 2015 | Tórsvøllur, Tórshavn, Faroe Islands | Greece | 2–0 | 2–1 | UEFA Euro 2016 qualification |
| 2 | 28 March 2016 | Estadio Municipal de Marbella, Marbella, Spain | Liechtenstein | 1–0 | 3–2 | Friendly |
| 3 | 25 March 2018 | Estadio Municipal de Marbella, Marbella, Spain | Liechtenstein | 2–0 | 3–0 | Friendly |
| 4 | 3 September 2020 | Tórsvøllur, Tórshavn, Faroe Islands | Malta | 3–2 | 3–2 | 2020–21 UEFA Nations League D |
| 5 | 7 June 2021 | Tórsvøllur, Tórshavn, Faroe Islands | Liechtenstein | 2–1 | 5–1 | Friendly |
| 6 | 7 June 2021 | Tórsvøllur, Tórshavn, Faroe Islands | Liechtenstein | 3–1 | 5–1 | Friendly |

== Honours ==
Copenhagen

- Danish Cup: 2014–15

Fredikstad

- Norwegian Cup: 2024

NSÍ Runavík

- Faroe Islands Premier League: 2026
