= Róaldur Jakobsen =

Faroese footballer

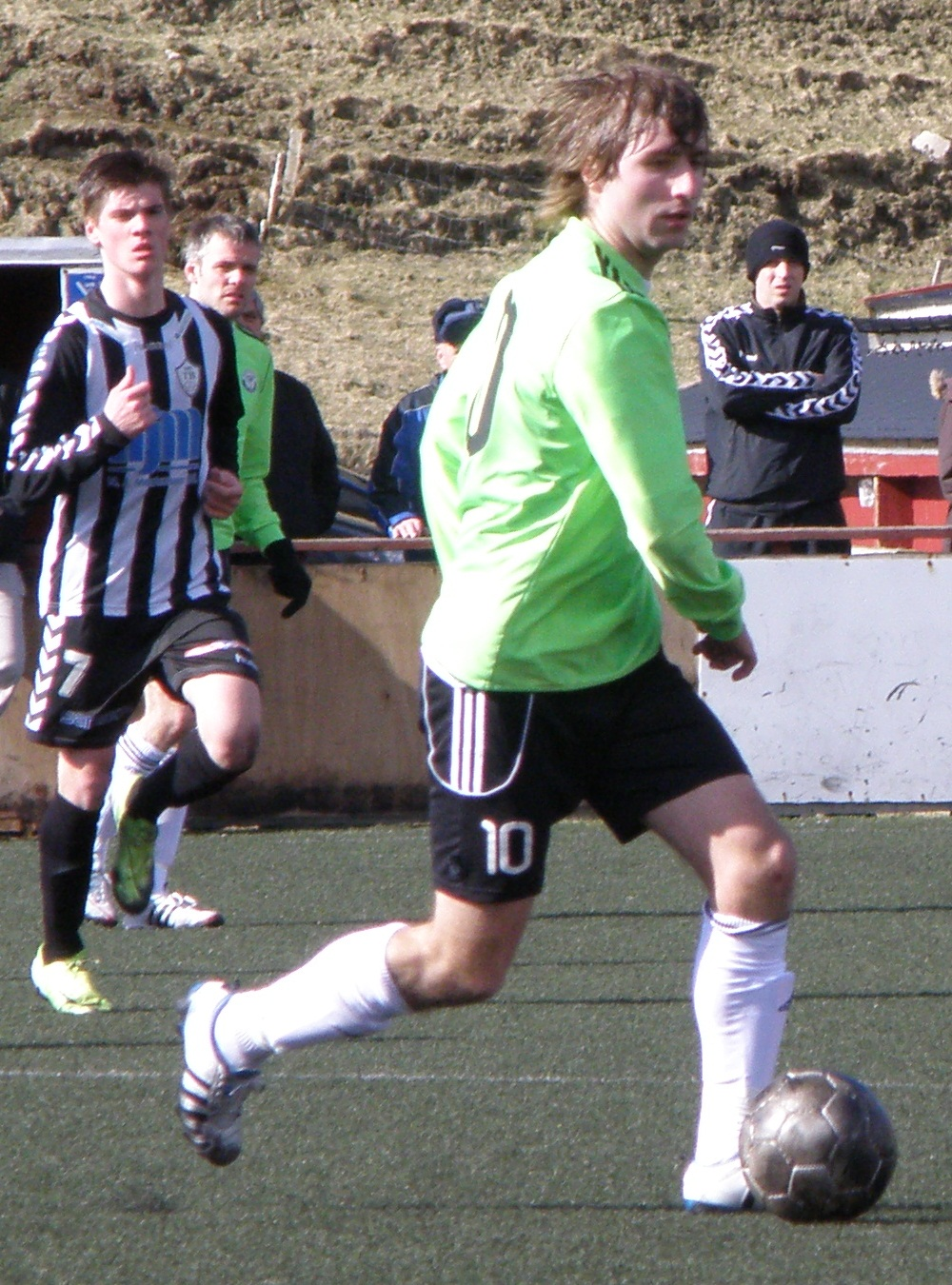
- Róaldur Jakobsen in 2012

Personal information
- Date of birth: 23 January 1991 (age 35)
- Place of birth: Tórshavn, Faroe Islands
- Height: 1.80 m (5 ft 11 in)
- Position: Midfielder

Team information
- Current team: B36 Tórshavn

Senior career*
Years	Team	Apps	(Gls)
2007–2018	B36 Tórshavn	307	(56)

International career^{‡}
2007	Faroe Islands U17	7	(0)
2008	Faroe Islands U19	3	(0)
2008–2012	Faroe Islands U21	14	(2)
2014–2017	Faroe Islands	6	(1)
- * Club domestic league appearances and goals as of 14 October 2017 ‡ National team caps and goals as of 14 October 2017

Róaldur Jakobsen (born 23 January 1991) is a Faroese retired international footballer who played for B36 Torshavn, as a midfielder.

== Career ==
Róaldur Jakobsen played club football for B36. He has won the Faroese championship with B36 Tórshavn three times, in 2011, 2014 and 2015.

He made his international debut for Faroe Islands in 2014 and scored his first goal against Hungary, one year later on 8 October 2015.

In 2017-18 B36 Tórshavn won two epic cup matches against the local rivals HB Tórshavn, playing 9 against 11 for 40–50 minutes. In the first 9/11 match B36 was 1–2 down in extended time, but then Róaldur Jacobsen took action. First he equalized on a direct freekick, bringing B36 ahead on aggregate. And in the last minute he scored the goal of his career from 72 meters.

Róaldur Jakobsen retired from football in 2019 because of chronic injuries.

=== International goals ===
Scores and results list Faroe Islands' goal tally first.

No	Date	Venue	Opponent	Score	Result	Competition
1.	8 October 2015	Groupama Arena, Budapest, Hungary	Hungary	1–0	1–2	UEFA Euro 2016 qualification
