= Rógvi Jacobsen =

Faroese footballer

Personal information
- Date of birth: 5 March 1979 (age 47)
- Place of birth: Klaksvík, Faroe Islands
- Height: 1.94 m (6 ft 4 in)
- Position: Attacking midfielder

Senior career*
Years	Team	Apps	(Gls)
1996–2000	KÍ Klaksvík	59	(34)
2001–2004	HB Tórshavn	71	(26)
2005	KR Reykjavík	17	(3)
2005–2006	SønderjyskE	5	(0)
2006	KR Reykjavík	9	(1)
2006–2007	HB Tórshavn	37	(17)
2008	IL Hødd	10	(3)
2008	KÍ Klaksvík	9	(3)
2009–2010	ÍF Fuglafjørður	18	(10)
Total		235	(97)

International career
1994	Faroe Islands U17	2	(0)
1996–1997	Faroe Islands U19	5	(2)
1999–2009	Faroe Islands	53	(10)
- * Club domestic league appearances and goals

Rógvi Jacobsen (born 5 March 1979) is a Faroese former footballer who played as an attacking midfielder. He is the all-time top scorer of the Faroe Islands national team alongside Klæmint Olsen.

== Club career ==
Jacobsen was born in Klaksvík. He played at semi-professional level for Icelandic team KR Reykjavík and Danish side SønderjyskE.

In August 2007, he went on a trial to Carlisle United. The trial did not end with a permanent contract so he continued playing with HB. In 2008, he signed a professional contract with Norwegian First Division side IL Hødd.

== International career ==
Jacobsen made his debut for Faroe Islands in an August 1999, in a friendly match against Iceland. He is known for having scored a Faroese goal in the 2–1 home loss to the World Champions Italy. On 21 November 2007, he scored his 10th goal for the Faroese national team, in a 3–1 away loss to Italy, hence breaking Todi Jónsson's record, and became all-time leading scorer of his country. He has 53 caps for the Faroe Islands national side and has scored 10 goals.

In 2007, Jacobsen was nicknamed Inzaghi Faroese by La Gazzetta dello Sport.

== Career statistics ==
=== International ===
Appearances and goals by national team and year
National team	Year	Apps	Goals
Faroe Islands	1999	2	0
Faroe Islands	2000	5	0
Faroe Islands	2001	5	0
Faroe Islands	2002	5	1
Faroe Islands	2003	6	2
Faroe Islands	2004	6	2
Faroe Islands	2005	6	1
Faroe Islands	2006	4	0
Faroe Islands	2007	8	4
Faroe Islands	2008	4	0
Faroe Islands	2009	2	0
Total		53	10

Scores and results list Faroe Islands' goal tally first, score column indicates score after each Jacobsen goal.

List of international goals scored by Rógvi Jacobsen
No.	Date	Venue	Opponent	Score	Result	Competition
1	10 February 2002	Tsirion Stadium, Limassol, Cyprus	Poland	1–1	1–2	Friendly
2	7 June 2003	Laugardalsvöllur, Reykjavík, Iceland	Iceland	1–1	1–2	UEFA Euro 2004 qualifying
3	20 August 2003	Tórsvøllur, Tórshavn, Faroe Islands	Iceland	1–1	1–2	UEFA Euro 2004 qualifying
4	18 August 2004	Svangaskarð, Toftir, Faroe Islands	Malta	2–0	3–2	Friendly
5	9 October 2004	GSP Stadium, Nicosia, Cyprus	Cyprus	2–1	2–2	2006 FIFA World Cup qualification
6	5 June 2005	Svangaskarð, Toftir, Faroe Islands	Switzerland	1–1	1–3	2006 FIFA World Cup qualification
7	28 March 2007	Boris Paichadze Stadium, Tbilisi, Georgia	Georgia	1–2	1–3	UEFA Euro 2008 qualifying
8	2 June 2007	Tórsvøllur, Tórshavn, Faroe Islands	Italy	1–2	1–2	UEFA Euro 2008 qualifying
9	12 September 2007	S. Darius and S. Girėnas Stadium, Kaunas, Lithuania	Lithuania	1–2	1–2	UEFA Euro 2008 qualifying
10	21 November 2007	Stadio Alberto Braglia, Modena, Italy	Italy	1–3	1–3	UEFA Euro 2008 qualifying
