= Julian Johnsson =

Faroese footballer (born 1975)

Personal information
- Full name: Julian Schantz Johnsson
- Date of birth: 24 February 1975 (age 51)
- Place of birth: Faroe Islands
- Height: 1.89 m (6 ft 2 in)
- Position: Midfielder

Senior career*
Years	Team	Apps	(Gls)
1993–1995	HB Tórshavn	36	(3)
1995–1996	Vejle	0	(0)
1996–1997	B36 Tórshavn	33	(11)
1998–1999	Kongsvinger IL	29	(1)
1999–2001	Sogndal	38	(9)
2001–2002	Hull City	40	(4)
2002–2003	B36 Tórshavn	10	(3)
2003–2004	ÍA	31	(3)
2005–2006	B68 Toftir	24	(5)
2007	Svendborg	?	(?)

International career
1995–2006	Faroe Islands	62	(4)

Managerial career
- 2010–2011: Egebjerg Fodbold (assistant)
- 2013: Svendborg (assistant)
- 2015–2016: Svendborg
- * Club domestic league appearances and goals

Julian Johnsson (born 24 February 1975) is a Faroese former professional football midfielder.

== Club career ==
He played in the Faroe Islands for Tórshavn sides HB Tórshavn and B36 Tórshavn, before moving abroad to play in the Norwegian, English and Icelandic leagues. He left Hull City in 2002 after his wife failed to settle.

== International career ==
Johnsson made his debut for the Faroe Islands in an April 1995 European Championship qualifying match against Finland. He has earned 62 caps and 4 goals for the Faroe Islands national football team between 1995 and 2006. He is the third most capped player for the Faroe Islands national side.

== International goals ==
Scores and results list Faroe Islands' goal tally first.

#	Date	Venue	Opponent	Score	Result	Competition
1	25 May 1995	Svangaskarð, Toftir, Faroe Islands	San Marino	3-0	3-0	1996 Euro Qualification
2	21 August 2002	Tórsvøllur, Tórshavn, Faroe Islands	Liechtenstein	3-1	3-1	Friendly
3	6 September 2003	Hampden Park, Glasgow, Scotland	Scotland	1-3	1-3	Euro 2004 qualifying
4	29 April 2003	Tórsvøllur, Tórshavn, Faroe Islands	Kazakhstan	2-1	2-1	Friendly

== Bibliography ==
- 2006: Føroyingurin úr Danmark
