= Christian Holst =

Danish-Faroese footballer (born 1981)

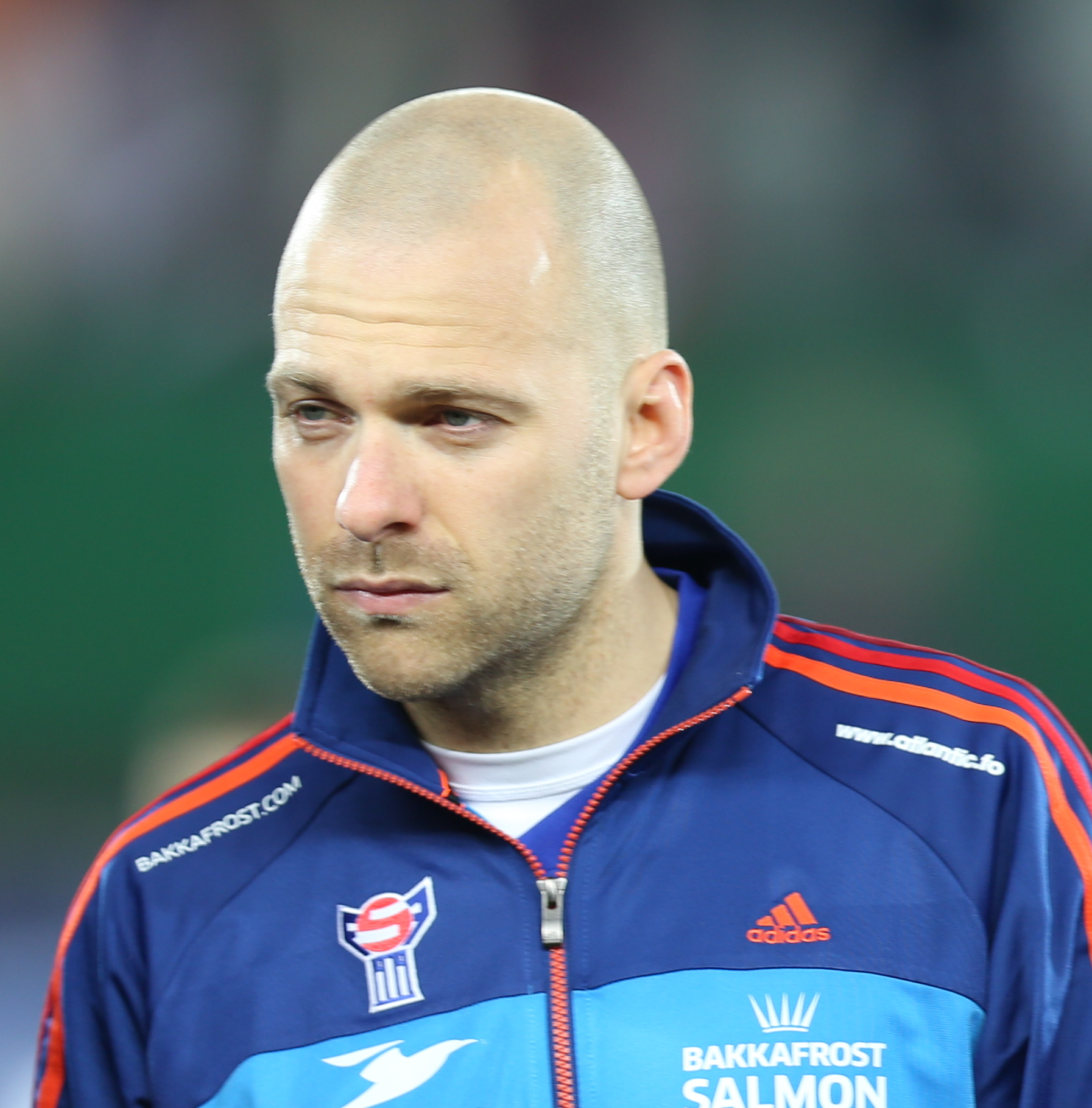

Personal information
- Full name: Christian Lamhauge Holst
- Date of birth: 25 December 1981 (age 44)
- Place of birth: Svendborg, Denmark
- Height: 1.79 m (5 ft 10 1/2 in)
- Position: Midfielder

Team information
- Current team: BK Frem (assistant coach)

Senior career*
Years	Team	Apps	(Gls)
- Thurø Boldklub af 1920
2001–2003	Svendborg FB	30	(17)
2003–2008	Lyngby BK	133	(70)
2008–2014	Silkeborg IF	179	(47)
2014–2016	Fremad Amager		
Total		342	(134)

International career
2003–2015	Faroe Islands	50	(6)
- * Club domestic league appearances and goals

Christian Lamhauge Holst (born 25 December 1981) is a Faroese former professional footballer who played as a midfielder. He gained 50 caps for the Faroe Islands national football team.

== Club career ==
Holst started his career at local clubs Thurø and Svendborg before moving to Lyngby Boldklub in 2003, being named Player of the Year of the Danish 2nd Division by the Spillerforeningen a year later. He joined Silkeborg IF on a free transfer in summer 2008.

== International career ==
Holst made his debut for the Faroe Islands in 2003, being born to a Danish father and a Faroese mother. To date, he has collected 50 caps, scoring 6 goals.

== Coaching career ==
=== Hvidovre IF ===
In August 2016, Holst was hired as a coach at Hvidovre IF.

=== BK Frem ===
On 20 April 2017, Holst took up his second coaching job at BK Frem.

== International goals ==
Scores and results list Faroe Islands' goal tally first.

#	Date	Venue	Opponent	Score	Result	Competition	Source
1	4 June 2008	A. Le Coq Arena, Tallinn, Estonia	Estonia	1–3	3–4	Friendly	
2	4 June 2008	A. Le Coq Arena, Tallinn, Estonia	Estonia	2–3	3–4	Friendly	
3	12 October 2010	Svangaskarð, Toftir, Faroe Islands	Northern Ireland	1–0	1–1	UEFA Euro 2012 Qual.	
4	1 March 2014	Victoria Stadium, Gibraltar	Gibraltar	2–1	4–1	Friendly	
5	1 March 2014	Victoria Stadium, Gibraltar	Gibraltar	4–1	4–1	Friendly	
6	7 September 2014	Tórsvøllur, Tórshavn, Faroe Islands	Finland	1–0	1–3	UEFA Euro 2016 Qual.	
