= Kári Reynheim =

Danish footballer and manager (born 1964)

Personal information
- Date of birth: 15 February 1964 (age 62)
- Place of birth: Faroe Islands
- Position: Striker

Team information
- Current team: ÍF Fuglafjarðar (Manager)

Senior career*
Years	Team	Apps	(Gls)
1985	HB Tórshavn		
1986	IK Grand Bodø		
1987	HB		
1988–1989	B36 Tórshavn		
1992	B36	17	(2)
1993	HB	14	(3)
1994	SÍ Sørvágur	?	(?)
1995	HB	11	(1)
1997	Eidsvold Turn	18	(0)

International career
1988–1995	Faroe Islands	27	(2)

Managerial career
- 1999 – 2000: IL Jotun
- B71 Sandur
- MB Miðvágur
- 2012: NSÍ Runavík
- 2017: AB Argir
- 2019–: ÍF Fuglafjarðar
- * Club domestic league appearances and goals

Kári Reynheim (born 15 February 1964) is a Faroese former football striker. He is currently the manager of ÍF Fuglafjarðar.

== Club career ==
A fine dribbler boasting a powerful shot, Reynheim played semi-professionally in Norway. Also, he played 110 matches, scoring 32 goals in all competitions for HB Tórshavn and he played for B36 Tórshavn.

== International career ==
Reynheim made his debut in an August 1988 friendly match against Iceland, the country's first FIFA-recognized match. He earned 27 caps and 2 goals between 1988 and 1995. His last international was a November 1995 European Championship qualifying match against Greece.

== International goals ==
Scores and results list Faroe Islands' goal tally first.

#	Date	Venue	Opponent	Score	Result	Competition
1	1 May 1991	Windsor Park, Belfast, Northern Ireland	Northern Ireland	1-1	1-1	1992 Euro qualifying
2	5 August 1992	Svangaskarð, Toftir, Faroe Islands	Israel	1-0	1-1	Friendly
