= 2011 Faroe Islands Premier League =

Faroe Islands Premier League
- Season: 2011
- Champions: B36 (9th title)
- Relegated: 07; B71
- Champions League: B36
- Europa League: EB/Streymur; Víkingur; NSÍ
- Matches: 135
- Goals: 477 (3.53 per match)
- Top goalscorer: Finnur Justinussen (21 goals)
- Biggest home win: NSÍ 9–0 07
- Biggest away win: B71 0–6 KÍ; B71 0–6 Víkingur; 07 1–7 EB
- Highest scoring: 07 4–6 NSÍ (19 June 2011)
- Longest winning run: EB/Streymur (10 games)
- Longest unbeaten run: B36 (16 games)
- Longest winless run: 07 Vestur, B71 (11 games each)
- Longest losing run: B71, KÍ (6 games each)

2011 Faroe Islands Premier League, also known as Vodafonedeildin for sponsorship reasons, is the sixty-ninth season of top-tier football on the Faroe Islands. It began on 9 April 2011 and ended on 22 October 2011. HB Tórshavn are the defending champions, having won their 21st league championship in the previous season.

== Teams ==
FC Suðuroy and AB Argir were relegated to 1. deild after finishing 9th and 10th in the 2010 season. Suðuroy are relegated after just one season in the top flight while AB Argir go down after two seasons in the top flight.

They were replaced by 1. deild champions 07 Vestur and runners-up KÍ Klaksvík. Both make their return to the top flight after a one-year absence.

=== Team summaries ===
Geographical location of the 2011 Faroese Premier League teams

Team	City	Stadium	Capacity	Manager
07 Vestur	Sandavágur	á Dungasandi	2,000	(Faroe Islands) Jóhan Nielsen
B36	Tórshavn	Gundadalur	5,000	(Faroe Islands) John Petersen (Faroe Islands) Mikkjal Thomassen
B68	Toftir	Svangaskarð	6,000	(Faroe Islands) Bill McLeod Jacobsen
B71	Sandur	Inni í Dal	2,000	(Poland) Piotr Krakowski
EB/Streymur	Streymnes	Við Margáir	1,000	(Faroe Islands) Heðin Askham
HB	Tórshavn	Gundadalur	5,000	(Faroe Islands) Sigfríður Clementsen
ÍF	Fuglafjørður	í Fløtugerði	3,000	(Faroe Islands) Rúni Nolsøe (Faroe Islands) Símun Eliasen
KÍ	Klaksvík	Injector Arena	3,000	(Serbia) Aleksandar Đorđević
NSÍ	Runavík	Við Løkin	2,000	(Faroe Islands) Pauli Poulsen
Víkingur	Norðragøta	Sarpugerði	2,000	(Faroe Islands) Jógvan Martin Olsen

== League table ==
Pos	Team	Pld	W	D	L	GF	GA	GD	Pts	Qualification or relegation
1	B36 Tórshavn (C)	27	21	4	2	63	28	+35	67	Qualification for the Champions League first qualifying round
2	EB/Streymur	27	19	3	5	66	32	+34	60	Qualification for the Europa League first qualifying round (Note: EB/Streymur won the 2011 Faroe Islands Cup competition and will qualify for the first qualifying round of the UEFA Europa League. The other two Europa League places were thus given to the third and fourth placed teams.)
3	Víkingur Gøta	27	18	5	4	61	31	+30	59	Qualification for the Europa League first qualifying round
4	NSÍ Runavík	27	11	8	8	58	47	+11	41	Qualification for the Europa League first qualifying round
5	KÍ	27	10	4	13	48	50	−2	34	
6	B68 Toftir	27	9	5	13	44	44	0	32	
7	ÍF	27	8	4	15	36	44	−8	28	
8	HB	27	7	5	15	46	56	−10	26	
9	07 Vestur (R)	27	6	6	15	30	65	−35	24	Relegation to 1. deild
10	B71 Sandoy (R)	27	3	2	22	25	80	−55	11	Relegation to 1. deild

Source: Soccerway
Rules for classification: 1) points; 2) goal difference; 3) number of goals scored.
(C) Champions; (R) Relegated

== Results ==
The schedule consisted of a total of 27 games. Each team played three games against every opponent in no particular order. At least one of the games was at home and one was away. The additional home game for every match-up was randomly assigned prior to the season with the top five teams of the previous season having 5 home games.

=== Regular home games ===
Home \ Away	07V	B36	B68	B71	EBS	HB	ÍF	KÍ	NSÍ	VÍK
07 Vestur		0–3	0–1	2–1	1–7	1–0	1–0	3–3	4–6	1–1
B36 Tórshavn	1–0		1–0	4–1	1–0	4–1	1–1	4–1	4–3	2–0
B68 Toftir	1–1	2–2		3–1	1–0	0–0	3–4	3–0	1–1	1–2
B71 Sandoy	2–0	2–3	0–5		1–2	0–2	1–4	0–6	1–6	0–3
EB/Streymur	1–0	2–1	3–2	5–1		3–1	1–0	2–0	2–2	2–1
Havnar Bóltfelag	5–0	1–3	3–3	2–0	3–2		3–1	1–4	0–0	1–2
ÍF Fuglafjørður	1–2	1–1	3–1	1–2	0–4	3–0		0–1	1–1	1–2
KÍ Klaksvík	1–2	0–2	3–1	1–2	1–3	2–2	2–0		1–2	0–1
NSÍ Runavík	9–0	2–3	1–0	1–1	2–2	2–1	1–1	3–3		0–1
Víkingur Gøta	1–1	1–1	2–1	3–2	2–1	3–1	1–0	2–1	3–2	

Source: Soccerway
Legend: Blue = home team win; Yellow = draw; Red = away team win.

=== Additional home games ===
Home \ Away	07V	B36	B68	B71	EBS	HB	ÍF	KÍ	NSÍ	VÍK
07 Vestur		2–3	0–1	2–2				2–2		
B36 Tórshavn				2–1	1–2	3–2	3–0			
B68 Toftir		2–3			3–2	1–0	0–1			
B71 Sandoy			0–3					0–1	1–3	1–4
EB/Streymur	2–1			1–0				3–0	5–1	3–3
Havnar Bóltfelag	4–1			5–0	3–4			1–3		2–2
ÍF Fuglafjørður	1–2			3–2	0–2	7–1		0–1		
KÍ Klaksvík		0–3	5–3						5–1	1–4
NSÍ Runavík	1–0	1–2	2–1			2–1	1–2			
Víkingur Gøta	5–1	0–2	4–1				4–0		1–2	

Updated to match(es) played on 22 October 2011. Source: Soccerway
Legend: Blue = home team win; Yellow = draw; Red = away team win.

== Top goalscorers ==
Including matches on 16 October; Source: Faroese FA

Rank	Player	Club	Goals
1	(Faroe Islands) Finnur Justinussen	Víkingur	21
2	(Faroe Islands) Klæmint Olsen	NSÍ	17
3	(Poland) Łukasz Cieślewicz	B36	15
4	(Faroe Islands) Arnbjørn Hansen	EB/Streymur	14
4	(Faroe Islands) Kristoffur Jakobsen	KÍ	14
6	(Faroe Islands) Christian Høgni Jacobsen	NSÍ	13
6	(Brazil) Clayton Soares do Nascimento	07 Vestur	13
8	(Nigeria) Chris Muomaife	ÍF	12
8	(Faroe Islands) Jákup á Borg	B36	12
10	(Faroe Islands) Leif Niclasen	EB/Streymur	11
10	(Faroe Islands) Símun Samuelsen	HB	11

== See also ==
- 2011 Faroe Islands Cup
