= 1998 1. deild =

Coordinates: 62.0167°N 6.7667°W

Faroe Islands Premier League Football
- Season: 1998
- Champions: HB
- Relegated: TB
- Matches played: 90
- Goals scored: 385 (4.28 per match)
- Biggest home win: GÍ 11–1 Sumba; KÍ Klaksvík 10–0 TB
- Biggest away win: Sumba 0–10 B36
- Highest scoring: GÍ 11–1 Sumba

In 1998, 1. deild was the top-tier league in Faroe Islands football (since 2005, the top tier has been the Faroe Islands Premier League, with 1. deild becoming the second tier).

This article details the statistics of 1. deild in the 1998 season.

== Overview ==
It was contested by 10 teams, and Havnar Bóltfelag won the championship.

== League standings ==
Pos	Team	Pld	W	D	L	GF	GA	GD	Pts
1	Havnar Bóltfelag	18	14	3	1	57	19	+38	45
2	KÍ Klaksvík	18	11	5	2	54	24	+30	38
3	B36 Tórshavn	18	11	4	3	59	24	+35	37
4	GÍ Gøta	18	8	4	6	48	30	+18	28
5	NSÍ Runavík	18	8	4	6	37	28	+9	28
6	B68 Toftir	18	6	4	8	39	39	0	22
7	VB Vágur	18	5	6	7	27	40	−13	21
8	ÍF Fuglafjørður	18	1	8	9	25	47	−22	11
9	Sumba	18	2	3	13	18	73	−55	9
10	TB Tvøroyri	18	1	5	12	21	61	−40	8

== Results ==
The schedule consisted of a total of 18 games. Each team played two games against every opponent in no particular order. One of the games was at home and one was away.

Home \ Away	B36	B68	GÍG	HB	ÍF	KÍ	NSÍ	SUM	TB	VBV
B36 Tórshavn		2–1	1–1	0–1	7–2	3–2	2–0	6–2	7–0	8–2
B68 Toftir	2–3		0–1	0–0	3–3	1–5	3–2	6–0	4–3	2–1
GÍ Gøta	5–2	2–2		1–3	3–1	2–2	5–1	11–1	3–0	0–2
HB	2–3	3–1	3–0		3–2	4–0	2–1	4–1	4–3	5–1
ÍF	0–0	2–2	0–4	1–10		0–0	1–1	6–0	1–2	2–5
KÍ	1–1	4–3	4–2	2–2	2–0		4–1	4–1	10–0	2–1
NSÍ Runavík	2–0	4–1	3–1	0–4	1–1	0–0		3–0	1–0	4–1
Sumbiar ítróttarfelag	0–10	1–2	1–1	1–2	1–0	2–5	1–6		3–2	1–1
TB	0–3	0–5	1–5	1–4	2–2	1–3	2–2	2–2		2–2
VB Vágur	1–1	3–1	3–1	1–1	1–1	0–4	0–5	2–0	0–0	

Source: www.faroesoccer.com
Legend: Blue = home team win; Yellow = draw; Red = away team win.

== Top goalscorers ==
Source: faroesoccer.com

20 goals

- (Faroe Islands) Jákup á Borg (B36)

18 goals

- (Faroe Islands) John Petersen (B36)
- (Faroe Islands) Kurt Mørkøre (KÍ)
- (Faroe Islands) Súni Fríði Barbá (HB)

17 goals

- (Faroe Islands) Allan Mørkøre (HB)

12 goals

- (Faroe Islands) Henning Jarnskor (GÍ)
- (Faroe Islands) Sámal Joensen (GÍ)

10 goals

- (Faroe Islands) Rógvi Jacobsen (KÍ)

9 goals

- (Faroe Islands) Fróði Benjaminsen (B68)
