= 2021 Faroe Islands Cup =

Løgmanssteypið

Tournament details
- Country: Faroe Islands
- Teams: 18

Final positions
- Champions: B36 Tórshavn (7th title)
- Runners-up: NSÍ Runavík

Tournament statistics
- Matches played: 14
- Goals scored: 49 (3.5 per match)
- Top goal scorer(s): Klæmint Olsen (5 goals)

Awards
- Best player: Klæmint Olsen

The 2021 Faroe Islands Cup was the 67th edition of the Faroe Islands domestic football cup. It started on 10 April and ended on 6 December. Havnar Bóltfelag were the defending champions.

Only the first teams of the participating clubs were allowed to enter the competition.

The final was broadcast by Kringvarp Føroya, and streamed worldwide.

Locations of the 2021 Faroe Islands Cup teams

== Round and draw dates ==
Round	Draw date	Game date
Preliminary round	1 April 2021	8 April 2021
First round	1 April 2021	18 April 2021
Quarterfinals	25 May 2021	28–30 May and 22 September 2021
Semifinals		20–28 November 2021
Final	—	4 December 2021

== Preliminary round ==
10 April 2021	Royn Hvalba (3)	0–3	FC Hoyvík (3)	Venue Á Skørðunum, Hvalba
17:00		Report		Attendance: 80; Referee: Kristian Gunnar Joensen

10 April 2021	MB (4)	0–3	Undrið (3)	MB Arena, Miðvágur
20:00		Report		Attendance: 150; Referee: Stephan Petursson

== First round ==
18 April 2021	TB (1)	0–2	HB (1)	Við Stórá, Trongisvágur
15:30		Report		Attendance: 150; Referee: Rúni Gaardbo

18 April 2021	B71 Sandoy (2)	2–1	Undrið (3)	Venue inni í Dal, Sandur Sandoy
16:00		Report		Attendance: 200; Referee: Jákup Mohr

18 April 2021	07 Vestur (1)	3–0	FC Hoyvík (3)	Svangaskarð, Toftir
19:00		Report		Attendance: 500; Referee: Eiler Rasmussen

18 April 2021	B36 (1)	6–0	AB (1)	Venue Tórsvøllur (Tórshavn, Streymoy)
17:00		Report		Referee: Jón Þór Baldvinsson

18 April 2021	Víkingur Gøta (1)	2–0	Skála (1)	Venue Sarpugerði (Norðragøta, Eysturoy)
17:00		Report		Attendance: 137; Referee: Rúni Olsen

18 April 2021	B68 Toftir (1)	1–2	EB/Streymur (1)	Venue Svangaskarð (Toftir, Eysturoy)
17:00		Report		Referee: Petur Reinert

18 April 2021	ÍF (1)	3–0	FC Suðuroy (3)	Venue á Fløtugerði (Fuglafjørður, Eysturoy)
17:00		Report		Attendance: 300; Referee: Jóhan Hendrik Ellefsen

20 April 2021	KÍ (1)	1–2	NSÍ Runavík (1)	Venue Við Djúpumýrar (Klaksvík, Borðoy)
19:15		Report		Attendance: 200; Referee: Bjarki Danielsen

== Quarter-finals ==
28 May 2021	NSÍ Runavík (1)	3–0	07 Vestur (1)	Runavík Stadium, Runavík
20:00		Report		Referee: Kári Jóannesarson á Høvdanum

29 May 2021	EB/Streymur (1)	2–3	B36 (1)	Við Margáir, Streymnes
16:00		Report		Referee: Rúni Gaardbo

30 May 2021	ÍF (1)	2–3	Víkingur Gøta (1)	Venue á Fløtugerði (Fuglafjørður, Eysturoy)
17:00		Report		Referee: Alex Troleis

22 September 2021	B71 Sandoy (2)	0–5	HB (1)	Venue inni í Dal, Sandur Sandoy
19:15		Report		Referee: Rani Skaalum

== Semi-finals ==
=== Summary ===
Team 1	Agg.	Team 2	1st leg	2nd leg
HB (1)	4(6)–4(7)	NSÍ Runavík (1)	2-2	2–2
Víkingur Gøta (1)	1–3	B36 (1)	1-0	0–3

=== Matches ===
21 November 2021	HB (1)	2–2	NSÍ Runavík (1)	Gundadalur, Tórshavn
00:00

29 November 2021	NSÍ Runavík (1)	2–2	HB (1)	Runavík Stadium, Runavík
00:00

21 November 2021	Víkingur Gøta (1)	1–0	B36 (1)	Sarpugerði, Norðragøta
00:00

29 November 2021	B36 (1)	3–0	Víkingur Gøta (1)	Gundadalur, Tórshavn
00:00

== Final ==
4 December 2021
18:00

NSÍ Runavík	1–1 (a.e.t.)	B36 Tórshavn
Knudsen 10'	Report	Johansen 30'
Penalties
K. Olsen (penalty scored); Egilstoft (penalty scored); Knudsen (penalty missed); Hansen (penalty scored); Jensen (penalty missed)	3–4	(penalty scored) Enevoldsen; (penalty missed) Mellemgaard; (penalty scored) Heinesen; (penalty scored) Petersen; (penalty scored) Thrane

Tórsvøllur, Torshavn
Attendance: 2,300
Referee: Eiler Rasmussen
