= 2010 Faroe Islands Premier League =

Faroe Islands Premier League Football
- Season: 2010
- Champions: HB Tórshavn; 21st title
- Relegated: FC Suðuroy; AB Argir
- Champions League: HB Tórshavn
- Europa League: EB/Streymur (via domestic cup); NSÍ Runavík; ÍF Fuglafjørður
- Matches: 135
- Goals: 438 (3.24 per match)
- Top goalscorer: (Faroe Islands) Arnbjørn Hansen & (Faroe Islands) Christian Høgni Jacobsen (22 goals each)
- Biggest home win: NSÍ 9–1 B71 (23 October); EB/Streymur 8–0 B71 (1 August)
- Biggest away win: B71 1–6 NSÍ (15 August); ÍF 0–5 B36 (27 June); AB 0–5 B36 (2 October)
- Highest scoring: NSÍ 9–1 B71 (23 October)
- Longest winning run: NSÍ (9 games) (4 May–19 June)
- Longest unbeaten run: NSÍ (15 games) (4 May–25 August)
- Longest winless run: AB (17 games) (29 May–17 October)
- Longest losing run: AB (8 games) (22 August–17 October)

2010 Faroe Islands Premier League, also known as Vodafonedeildin for sponsoring reasons, was the sixty-eighth season of top-tier football on the Faroe Islands. It began on 31 March 2010 with a match between NSÍ Runavík and ÍF Fuglafjørður and ended on 23 October 2010. HB Tórshavn were the defending champions, having won their 20th league championship last season.

== Teams ==
KÍ Klaksvík and 07 Vestur were relegated to 1. deild after finishing 9th and 10th in the 2009 season. They were replaced by 1. deild champions VB/Sumba and runners-up B71 Sandoy.

In other changes, VB/Sumba were renamed FC Suðuroy prior to this season.

=== Team summaries ===
Geographical location of the 2010 Faroese Premier League teams

Team	City	Stadium	Capacity	Manager
AB	Argir	Inni í Vika	2,000	(Faroe Islands) Samal Erik Hentze
B36	Tórshavn	Gundadalur	5,000	(Faroe Islands) Allan Mørkøre
B68	Toftir	Svangaskarð	6,000	(Faroe Islands) Bill McLeod Jacobsen
B71	Sandur	Inni í Dal	2,000	(Poland) Piotr Krakowski
EB/Streymur	Streymnes	Við Margáir	1,000	(Faroe Islands) Heðin Askham
FC Suðuroy	Vágur	á Eiðinum	3,000	(Faroe Islands) Jón Pauli Olsen
HB	Tórshavn	Gundadalur	5,000	(Faroe Islands) Julian Hansen(int.)
ÍF	Fuglafjørður	í Fløtugerði	3,000	(Faroe Islands) Abraham Løkin
NSÍ	Runavík	Við Løkin	2,000	(Faroe Islands) Pauli Poulsen
Víkingur	Norðragøta	Sarpugerði	2,000	(Faroe Islands) Jógvan Martin Olsen

== League table ==
Pos	Team	Pld	W	D	L	GF	GA	GD	Pts	Qualification or relegation
1	HB (C)	27	16	6	5	49	32	+17	54	Qualification for the Champions League second qualifying round
2	EB/Streymur	27	14	9	4	65	30	+35	51	Qualification for the Europa League second qualifying round (Note: EB/Streymur won the 2010 Faroe Islands Cup competition and thereby qualified for the second qualifying round of the UEFA Europa League.)
3	NSÍ Runavík	27	14	6	7	60	33	+27	48	Qualification for the Europa League first qualifying round
4	ÍF	27	12	7	8	50	41	+9	43	Qualification for the Europa League first qualifying round
5	Víkingur Gøta	27	12	7	8	44	35	+9	43	
6	B36 Tórshavn	27	11	7	9	44	36	+8	40	
7	B68 Toftir	27	8	7	12	42	47	−5	31	
8	B71 Sandoy	27	5	8	14	24	65	−41	23	
9	Suðuroy (R)	27	5	7	15	33	54	−21	22	Relegation to 1. deild
10	AB (R)	27	2	8	17	27	65	−38	14	Relegation to 1. deild

Source: Soccerway
Rules for classification: 1) points; 2) goal difference; 3) number of goals scored.
(C) Champions; (R) Relegated

== Results ==
The schedule consists of a total of 27 games. Each team plays three games against every opponent in no particular order. At least one of the games will be at home and one will be away. The additional home game for every match-up is randomly assigned prior to the season.

=== Regular home games ===
Home \ Away	AB	B36	B68	B71	EBS	SUÐ	HB	ÍF	NSÍ	VÍK
Argja Bóltfelag		2–2	1–2	3–3	1–2	1–0	1–1	0–2	0–0	1–1
B36 Tórshavn	1–0		3–1	1–1	1–1	1–0	1–0	1–1	1–5	1–2
B68 Toftir	1–1	1–0		5–0	1–1	1–1	2–2	1–0	0–3	5–3
B71 Sandoy	1–0	0–3	1–0		2–3	3–1	0–1	0–2	1–6	0–0
EB/Streymur	2–1	1–2	3–0	8–0		2–0	0–1	3–0	1–1	2–2
Suðuroy	3–3	1–1	3–1	2–1	0–1		0–3	0–3	1–1	1–3
Havnar Bóltfelag	2–1	2–2	4–3	1–2	5–2	4–4		2–0	2–1	2–0
ÍF Fuglafjørður	4–4	0–5	4–2	1–1	1–1	2–0	2–1		3–5	0–1
NSÍ Runavík	3–0	4–3	2–1	2–0	2–1	2–1	2–0	1–2		0–2
Víkingur Gøta	5–3	1–3	0–0	0–0	2–2	4–1	0–0	1–3	2–3	

Source: Soccerway
Legend: Blue = home team win; Yellow = draw; Red = away team win.

=== Additional home games ===
Home \ Away	AB	B36	B68	B71	EBS	SUÐ	HB	ÍF	NSÍ	VÍK
Argja Bóltfelag		0–5		0–4		1–0		1–4		
B36 Tórshavn			3–1					1–0	2–1	
B68 Toftir	3–0			1–1				3–3	3–2	2–0
B71 Sandoy		0–0			0–4	2–2	0–2			
EB/Streymur	6–0	4–1	3–1			5–2	1–1			
Suðuroy		2–1	2–1						1–1	0–2
Havnar Bóltfelag	3–0	2–1	1–0			1–4			3–2	
ÍF Fuglafjørður				3–0	3–3	3–1	1–2			
NSÍ Runavík	2–1			9–1	0–0			0–0		0–1
Víkingur Gøta	3–1	1–0		5–0	0–3		0–1	1–3		

Source: Soccerway
Legend: Blue = home team win; Yellow = draw; Red = away team win.

== Top goalscorers ==
Including matches on 23 October; Source: Faroese FA

22 goals

- (Faroe Islands) Arnbjørn Hansen (EB/Streymur)
- (Faroe Islands) Christian Høgni Jacobsen (NSÍ Runavík)

13 goals

- (Faroe Islands) Fróði Benjaminsen (HB Tórshavn)

11 goals

- (Faroe Islands) Øssur Dalbúð (ÍF Fuglafjørður)
- (Faroe Islands) Klæmint Olsen (NSÍ Runavík)

10 goals

- (Faroe Islands) Pól Jóhannus Justinussen (B68 Toftir)
- (Faroe Islands) Jón Krosslá Poulsen (FC Suðuroy)
- (Faroe Islands) Sølvi Vatnhamar (Víkingur)

8 goals

- (Faroe Islands) Rógvi Poulsen (HB Tórshavn)
- (Faroe Islands) Hans Pauli Samuelsen (EB/Streymur)
- (Serbia) Nenad Sarić (ÍF Fuglafjørður)
- (Faroe Islands) Daniel Udsen (EB/Streymur)

== See also ==
- 2010 Faroe Islands Cup
