= 1999 1. deild =

Coordinates: 62.0167°N 6.7667°W

Faroe Islands Premier League Football
- Season: 1999
- Champions: KÍ
- Relegated: ÍF
- Matches played: 90
- Goals scored: 311 (3.46 per match)
- Biggest home win: B71 6–0 ÍF; HB 7–1 B71
- Biggest away win: Sumba 1–6 B36
- Highest scoring: GÍ 7–2 Sumba

In 1999, 1. deild was the top tier league in Faroe Islands football (since 2005, the top tier has been the Faroe Islands Premier League, with 1. deild becoming the second tier).

This article details the statistics of 1. deild in the 1999 season.

== Overview ==
It was contested by 10 teams, and KÍ Klaksvík won the championship.

== League standings ==
Pos	Team	Pld	W	D	L	GF	GA	GD	Pts
1	KÍ Klaksvík	18	13	2	3	38	19	+19	41
2	GÍ Gøta	18	12	3	3	46	24	+22	39
3	B36 Tórshavn	18	12	2	4	52	22	+30	38
4	Havnar Bóltfelag	18	11	4	3	41	16	+25	37
5	NSÍ Runavík	18	6	5	7	25	26	−1	23
6	VB Vágur	18	6	3	9	19	27	−8	21
7	B68 Toftir	18	5	3	10	22	41	−19	18
8	B71 Sandur	18	3	5	10	26	45	−19	14
9	Sumba ÍF	18	2	5	11	22	43	−21	11
10	ÍF Fuglafjørður	18	2	4	12	20	48	−28	10

== Results ==
The schedule consisted of a total of 18 games. Each team played two games against every opponent in no particular order. One of the games was at home and one was away.

Home \ Away	B36	B68	B71	GÍG	HB	ÍF	KÍ	NSÍ	SUM	VBV
B36 Tórshavn		4–0	6–1	4–0	0–2	4–2	2–0	3–2	3–1	6–1
B68 Toftir	1–2		2–0	2–5	1–5	1–2	2–3	0–0	3–1	0–0
B71 Sandoy	0–0	1–0		2–5	2–2	6–0	1–0	2–3	2–1	1–3
GÍ Gøta	2–1	3–0	2–1		1–2	2–1	2–1	4–1	7–2	3–1
HB	4–2	1–1	7–1	2–0		4–0	1–2	1–3	2–2	2–0
ÍF	1–4	2–4	3–3	1–5	0–1		0–1	1–1	2–1	1–2
KÍ	3–2	5–0	3–1	0–0	0–0	4–1		3–0	2–1	2–1
NSÍ Runavík	1–3	5–0	4–0	1–1	0–2	0–0	1–3		1–0	1–0
Sumbiar ítróttarfelag	1–6	2–3	1–1	1–1	0–3	2–2	2–3	1–1		1–0
VB Vágur	0–0	0–2	1–1	1–3	1–0	3–1	2–1	2–0	1–2	

Source: www.faroesoccer.com
Legend: Blue = home team win; Yellow = draw; Red = away team win.

== Top goalscorers ==
17 goals

- (Faroe Islands) Jákup á Borg (B36)

16 goals

- (Faroe Islands) John Petersen (B36)

13 goals

- (Faroe Islands) Kurt Mørkøre (KÍ)

12 goals

- (Faroe Islands) Eli Hentze (B71)
- (Faroe Islands) Henning Jarnskor (GÍ)

11 goals

- (Serbia) Aleksandar Radosavljević (GÍ)

10 goals

- (Serbia) Nebojša Veljković (Sumba)
- (Faroe Islands) Rógvi Jacobsen (KÍ)
- (Faroe Islands) Súni Fríði Barbá (HB)

8 goals

- (Brazil) Marcello Marcelino (B68)
