= 2011 Faroe Islands Cup =

Tournament details
- Country: Faroe Islands
- Teams: 19

Final positions
- Champions: EB/Streymur
- Runners-up: ÍF Fuglafjørður

Tournament statistics
- Matches played: 20
- Goals scored: 68 (3.4 per match)
- Top goal scorer: (Senegal) Ibrahima Camara (4 goals)

The 2011 Faroe Islands Cup was the 57th edition of the Faroe Islands domestic football cup. It started on 26 March 2011 and ended with the final on 8 August 2011. EB/Streymur were the defending champions, having won their third cup title the previous year. The winner of the competition will qualify for the first qualifying round of the 2012–13 UEFA Europa League.

Only the first teams of Faroese football clubs were allowed to participate. The preliminary round involved only teams from 1. deild, 2. deild and 3. deild competitions. Teams from the highest division entered the competition in the first round.

== Preliminary round ==
Entering this round are two clubs from the 1. deild, two clubs from the 2. deild and two clubs from the 3. deild. These matches took place on 26 March 2011. The draw for this round of the competition took place on 7 March 2011.

Team 1	Score	Team 2
Undri Tórshavn	6–0	MB Miðvágur
TB Tvøroyri	2–0	FF Giza Tórshavn
Skála IF	7–2	Royn Hvalba

== First round ==
Entering in this round are the three winners from the preliminary round, all ten clubs from the Faroe Islands Premier League and three clubs from the 1. deild. These matches took place on 2 April 2011. The draw for this round of the competition took place on 7 March 2011.

Team 1	Score	Team 2
B68 Toftir	5–0	FC Hoyvík
HB Tórshavn	0–2	Víkingur Gøta
Undri	0–2	KÍ Klaksvík
NSÍ Runavík	2–0	B71 Sandoy
07 Vestur	3–0	FC Suðuroy
ÍF Fuglafjørður	6–0	Skála
B36 Tórshavn	0–2	EB/Streymur
AB Argir	1–0	TB

== Quarter-finals ==
Entering this round are the eight winners from the first round. These matches took place on 4 May 2011.

Team 1	Score	Team 2
07 Vestur	1–0	KÍ Klaksvík
Víkingur Gøta	2–2 (a.e.t.); 2–4 (p)	B68 Toftir
ÍF Fuglafjørður	7–1	AB Argir
NSÍ Runavík	0–3	EB/Streymur

== Semi-finals ==
Entering this round are the four winners from the quarterfinals. These ties will be played over two legs and will be played on 19 May 2011 and 14 June 2011.

Team 1	Agg.	Team 2	1st leg	2nd leg
ÍF Fuglafjørður	2–2 (a)	07 Vestur	1–0	1–2
B68 Toftir	2–3	EB/Streymur	0–0	2–3

== Final ==
5 August 2011
18:00 GMT

ÍF Fuglafjørður	0–3	EB/Streymur
	Report	A. Hansen 10', 90'; Udsen 55' (pen.)

Við Djúpumýrar, Klaksvík
Attendance: 2,278
Referee: Lars Müller

== Top goalscorers ==
Rank	Player	Team	Goals
1	(Senegal) Ibrahima Camara	B68	4
2	(Faroe Islands) Bartal Eliasen	ÍF	3
2	(Faroe Islands) Bogi Løkin	ÍF	3
4	(Faroe Islands) Arnbjørn Hansen	EB/Streymur	2
4	(Faroe Islands) Dánjal Pauli Højgaard	B68	2
4	(Faroe Islands) Erland Danielsen	Skála	2
4	(Faroe Islands) Finnur Justinussen	Víkingur	2
4	(Faroe Islands) Høgni J. Zachariassen	ÍF	2
4	(Faroe Islands) Jákup Johansen	Skála	2
4	(Sierra Leone) Tamba Yarjah	07 Vestur	2
