= Faroese Footballer of the Year =

Annual sports award

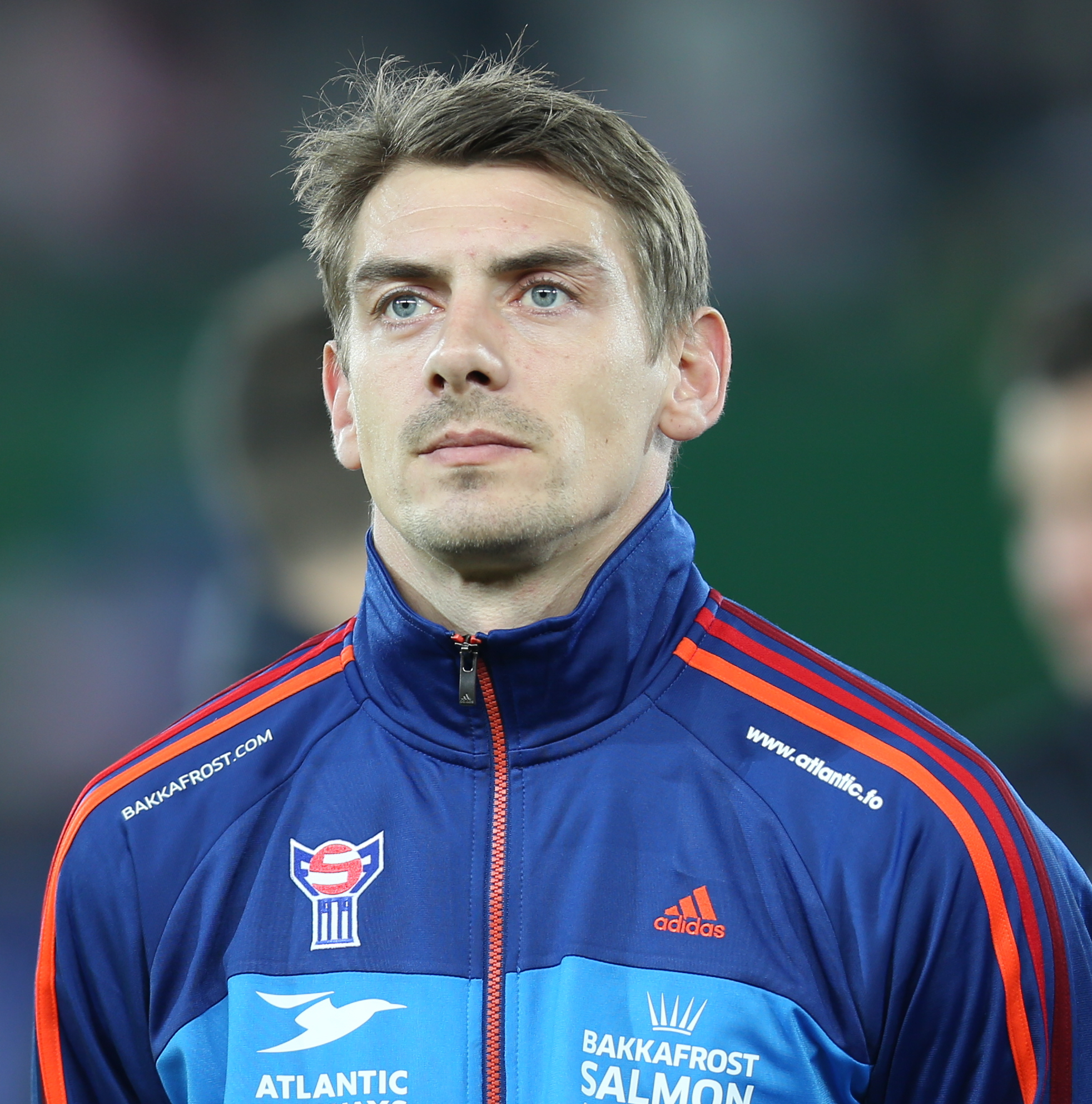
Fróði Benjaminsen, pictured here in 2013, is a four-time winner of the award.

The Faroese Footballer of the Year is an annual award chosen by a national newspaper, Sosialurin, to determine the best player in the Faroe Islands.

== Winners ==
Year	Player	Club	Reference
1995	John Petersen	(Faroe Islands) GÍ	
1999	John Petersen	(Faroe Islands) B36 Tórshavn	
2000	Rúni Nolsøe	(Faroe Islands) HB Tórshavn	
2001	Fróði Benjaminsen	(Faroe Islands) B68 Toftir	
2002	Andrew av Fløtum	(Faroe Islands) HB Tórshavn	
2003	Pól Thorsteinsson	(Faroe Islands) B36 Tórshavn	
2004	Súni Olsen	(Faroe Islands) GÍ	
2005	Jákup Mikkelsen	(Faroe Islands) B36 Tórshavn	
2006	Jákup á Borg	(Faroe Islands) HB Tórshavn	
2007	(Serbia) Nenad Stanković	(Faroe Islands) NSÍ Runavík	
2008	Arnbjørn Hansen	(Faroe Islands) EB/Streymur	
2009	Fróði Benjaminsen	(Faroe Islands) HB Tórshavn	
2010	Fróði Benjaminsen	(Faroe Islands) HB Tórshavn	
2011	(Poland) Łukasz Cieślewicz	(Faroe Islands) B36 Tórshavn	
2012	(Brazil) Clayton Soares	(Faroe Islands) ÍF	
2013	Fróði Benjaminsen	(Faroe Islands) HB Tórshavn	
2014	(Nigeria) Adeshina Lawal (Note: Initially awarded to Łukasz Cieślewicz on 21 November 2014. Six days later, the organisers announced that there had been a mix-up in the counting of votes, and Lawal was awarded Footballer of the Year instead, by the margin of a single vote.)	(Faroe Islands) B36 Tórshavn	
2015	(Poland) Łukasz Cieślewicz	(Faroe Islands) B36 Tórshavn	
2016	Sølvi Vatnhamar	(Faroe Islands) Víkingur	
2017	Sølvi Vatnhamar	(Faroe Islands) Víkingur	
2018	Adrian Justinussen	(Faroe Islands) HB Tórshavn	
2019	Jóannes Bjartalíð	(Faroe Islands) KÍ	
2020	Anthony Alger	(Faroe Islands) NSÍ Runavík	
2021	Árni Frederiksberg	(Faroe Islands) KÍ	
2022	Sølvi Vatnhamar	(Faroe Islands) Víkingur	
2023	Sølvi Vatnhamar	(Faroe Islands) Víkingur	
2024	Atli Gregersen	(Faroe Islands) Víkingur	
2025	Klæmint Olsen	(Faroe Islands) NSÍ Runavík	
