= 2006 Faroe Islands Cup =

Tournament details
- Country: Faroe Islands
- Teams: 20

Final positions
- Champions: B36 Tórshavn
- Runners-up: KÍ Klaksvík

Tournament statistics
- Matches played: 20
- Goals scored: 69 (3.45 per match)
- Top goal scorer(s): Fróði Benjaminsen (B36); Hans Pauli Samuelsen (EB/Streymur) (4 goals each)

The 2006 Faroe Islands Cup was played between 18 March and 14 October 2006. The cup was won by B36 Tórshavn.

Only first teams of Faroese football clubs were allowed to participate. The First Round involves teams from the second and third deild. Teams from the highest two divisions enter the competition in the 2nd Round.

== First round ==
The matches were played on 16 March 2006.

Team 1	Score	Team 2
Fram Tórshavn	4–1	NÍF Nolsoy
TB Tvøroyri	3–1	Royn Hvalba
FS Vágar	1–2	AB Argir
SÍ Sørvágur	1–0	MB Miðvágur

== Second round ==
The matches were played on 25 March 2006.

Team 1	Score	Team 2
HB Tórshavn	4–1	VB/Sumba
GÍ Gøta	4–1	LÍF Leirvík
EB/Streymur	3–2	B71 Sandur
B36 Tórshavn	5–0	TB Tvøroyri
KÍ Klaksvík	w/o^{1}	Fram Tórshavn
SÍ Sørvágur	1–4	NSÍ Runavík
Skála ÍF	2–1 (a.e.t.)	AB Argir
B68 Toftir	1–1 (a.e.t.); 4–3 (p)	ÍF Fuglafjørður

Notes

- Note 1: Fram and NÍF were excluded from competition for trouble in their first round match.

== Quarter-finals ==
The matches were played on 2 May 2006 except for the EB/Streymur – HB Tórshavn match, which was postponed and was played on 13 September 2006.

Team 1	Score	Team 2
KÍ Klaksvík	4–2 (a.e.t.)	GÍ Gøta
B68 Toftir	0–1	B36 Tórshavn
Skála IF	1–0	NSÍ Runavík
EB/Streymur	6–2	HB Tórshavn

== Semi-finals ==
The first legs were played on 20 September and the second legs on 27 September 2006.

Team 1	Agg.	Team 2	1st leg	2nd leg
EB/Streymur	1–1; 4–5 (p)	B36 Tórshavn	1–0	0–1 (a.e.t.)
Skála ÍF	0–5	KÍ Klaksvík	0–3	0–2

== Final ==
14 October 2006
17:00

B36 Tórshavn	2–1	KÍ Klaksvík
Benjaminsen 45' (pen.); Sylla 83'	Report	Danielsen 46' (pen.)

Gundadalur, Tórshavn
Referee: Dagfinn Forná

== Top goalscorers ==
Rank	Player	Team	Goals
1	(Faroe Islands) Fróði Benjaminsen	B36	4
1	(Faroe Islands) Hans Pauli Samuelsen	EB/Streymur	4
3	(Faroe Islands) Arnbjørn Hansen	EB/Streymur	3
3	(Faroe Islands) Christian Høgni Jacobsen	NSÍ	3
3	(Serbia) Siniša Jovanović	KÍ	3
3	(France) Amed Davy Sylla	B36	3
7	(Faroe Islands) Allan Mørkøre	AB	2
7	(Brazil) Clayton Nascimento	B71	2
7	(Faroe Islands) Hans Jørgen Djurhuus	GÍ	2
7	(Faroe Islands) Jákup á Borg	HB	2
7	(Faroe Islands) Kristoffur Jacobsen	KÍ	2
7	(Faroe Islands) Rasmus Nolsøe	HB	2
7	(Faroe Islands) Sámal Joensen	GÍ	2

== See also ==
- Faroe Islands Super Cup
