= 2010 Faroe Islands Cup =

Tournament details
- Country: Faroe Islands
- Teams: 19

Final positions
- Champions: EB/Streymur
- Runners-up: ÍF Fuglafjørður

Tournament statistics
- Matches played: 20
- Goals scored: 63 (3.15 per match)
- Top goal scorer: (Faroe Islands) Súni Olsen (5 goals)

The 2010 Faroe Islands Cup started on 20 March 2010 and ended with the final on 6 August 2010. The defending champions were Víkingur Gøta, who won their first cup title in 2009. The Cup was won by EB/Streymur after they beat ÍF Fuglafjørður in the final. With the victory, EB/Streymur qualified for the second qualifying round of the 2011–12 UEFA Europa League.

Only the first teams of Faroese football clubs were allowed to participate. The Preliminary Round involved only teams from first, second and third deild. Teams from the highest division entered the competition in the first round.

== Preliminary round ==
These fixtures involve clubs below the Faroe Islands Premier League. These matches took place on 20 March 2010.

| Team 1 | Score | Team 2 |
|---|---|---|
| Royn Hvalba | 1–2 | FC Hoyvík |
| MB Miðvágur | 0–2 | Skála IF |
| FF Giza Tórshavn | 1–2 | Undri Tórshavn |

== First round ==
Entering in this round are the winners from the preliminary round and the clubs from this year's Faroe Islands Premier League. These matches were played on 27 March 2010 except for the FC Suðuroy – Skála IF match, which was postponed and was played on 21 April 2010.

| Team 1 | Score | Team 2 |
|---|---|---|
| HB Tórshavn | 0–1 | B36 Tórshavn |
| Undri Tórshavn | 0–1 | ÍF Fuglafjørður |
| AB Argir | 2–0 (a.e.t.) | KÍ Klaksvík |
| B71 Sandoy | 2–4 (a.e.t.) | Víkingur Gøta |
| EB/Streymur | 1–0 (a.e.t.) | NSÍ Runavík |
| B68 Toftir | 3–0 | 07 Vestur |
| FC Hoyvík | 2–0 | TB Tvøroyri |
| FC Suðuroy | 6–1 | Skála IF |

== Quarter-finals ==
Entering this round are the eight winners from the first round. These matches are scheduled for 25 April.

| Team 1 | Score | Team 2 |
|---|---|---|
| FC Hoyvík | 1–7 | B36 Tórshavn |
| FC Suðuroy | 1–4 | EB/Streymur |
| ÍF Fuglafjørður | 3–2 (a.e.t.) | B68 Toftir |
| Víkingur Gøta | 1–1 (a.e.t.); 4–3 (p) | AB Argir |

== Semi-finals ==
Entering this round are the four winners from the Quarterfinals. These ties are played over two legs, scheduled for 20 May and 8 June.

| Team 1 | Agg. | Team 2 | 1st leg | 2nd leg |
|---|---|---|---|---|
| B36 Tórshavn | 2–3 | EB/Streymur | 2–1 | 0–2 |
| ÍF Fuglafjørður | 4–2 | Víkingur Gøta | 1–2 | 3–0 |

== Final ==
6 August 2010
18:00 GMT

| EB/Streymur | 1–0 | ÍF Fuglafjørður |
|---|---|---|
| Anghel 25' | Report |

Við Djúpumýrar, Klaksvík
Attendance: 2,544
Referee: Ransin Djurhuus

== Top goalscorers ==
| Rank | Player | Team | Goals |
|---|---|---|---|
| 1 | (Faroe Islands) Súni Olsen | Víkingur | 5 |
| 2 | (Faroe Islands) Arnbjørn Hansen | EB/Streymur | 3 |
| 2 | (Faroe Islands) Jørgen Meitilberg | FC Hoyvík | 3 |
| 4 | (Faroe Islands) Bárður Olsen | B36 | 2 |
| 4 | (Ivory Coast) Evrard Blé | AB | 2 |
| 4 | (Faroe Islands) Hjalgrím Elttør | B36 | 2 |
| 4 | (Faroe Islands) Jákup á Borg | B36 | 2 |
| 4 | (Faroe Islands) Jón Poulsen | FC Suðuroy | 2 |
| 4 | (Senegal) Ndende Adama Guéye | B68 | 2 |
| 4 | (Faroe Islands) Sorin Anghel | EB/Streymur | 2 |
| 4 | (Faroe Islands) Øssur Dalbúð | ÍF | 2 |
