= Øssur Hansen =

Faroese footballer (born 1971)

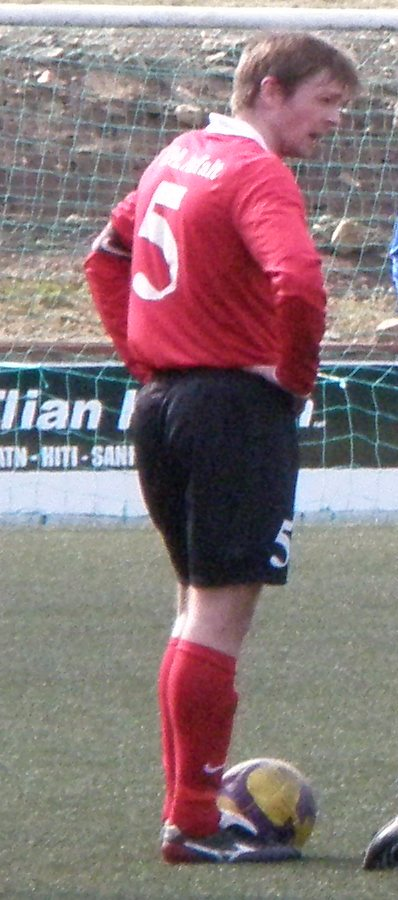
- Hansen playing for B68 Toftir against FC Suðuroy in 2010.

Personal information
- Date of birth: 7 January 1971 (age 55)
- Place of birth: Toftir, Faroe Islands
- Height: 1.78 m (5 ft 10 in)
- Position: Midfielder

Senior career*
Years	Team	Apps	(Gls)
1989–1991	B68 Toftir	?	(8)
1992–1993	B68	34	(17)
1994	Vejle BK	?	(0)
1994–1996	B68	39	(6)
1996	Herning Fremad	?	(?)
1997	B68	7	(0)
1997	GÍ Gøta	9	(6)
1998	B68	17	(6)
1999	B36 Tórshavn	16	(4)
2000–2001	B68	28	(7)
2001–2002	B93 København	?	(?)
2003–2010	B68	157	(27)

International career
1992–2002	Faroe Islands	51	(2)
- * Club domestic league appearances and goals as of 29 August 2010

Øssur Hansen (born 7 January 1971) is a Faroese football midfielder/defender who currently played for B68 Toftir in the Faroese Premier League. Hansen is amongst the 10 most capped players of the Faroe Islands national team with 51 matches.

== Club career ==
He has played most of his career with B68 Toftir, but has also played with GÍ Gøta, B36 Tórshavn and a number of smaller Danish Clubs.

== International career ==
Øssur Hansen made his debut for the Faroe Islands in May 1992 against Norway. He played 51 senior international matches scoring 2 goals, his last match was the famous October 2002 1–2 loss against Germany in Hanover.

He has scored two international goals, both of which proved indispensable; a penalty equalizer in a 2–1 victory away to Malta on 30 April 1997 and, most famously, a stunning free kick equalizer deep in injury time in a 2–2 draw against Slovenia on 3 September 2000. He is the sixth most capped player for the Faroe Islands national side.

== International goals ==
Scores and results list Faroe Islands' goal tally first.

#	Date	Venue	Opponent	Score	Result	Competition
1	30 April 1997	Ta' Qali Stadium, Ta' Qali, Malta	Malta	1-1	2-1	1998 WC Qualification
2	3 September 2000	Svangaskarð, Toftir, Faroe Islands	Slovenia	2-2	2-2	2002 WC Qualification
