= Súni Olsen =

Faroese footballer (born 1981)

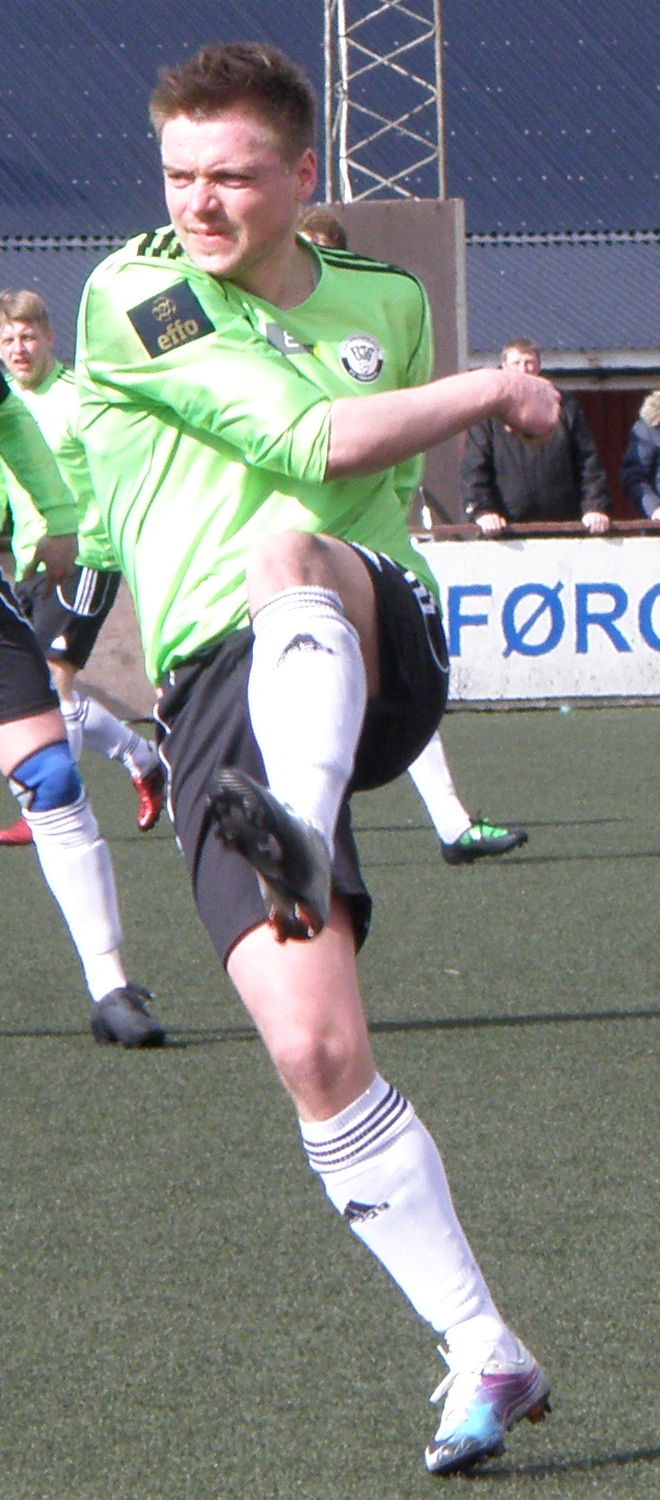

Personal information
- Date of birth: 7 March 1981 (age 45)
- Place of birth: Tórshavn, Faroe Islands
- Height: 1.77 m (5 ft 9 1/2 in)
- Position: Midfielder

Senior career*
Years	Team	Apps	(Gls)
1997–2000	GÍ Gøta	48	(20)
2001–2002	FC Zwolle	22	(3)
2002–2005	GÍ Gøta	47	(26)
2005–2007	AaB Aalborg	26	(1)
2008	Viborg FF	12	(1)
2008	B36 Tórshavn	2	(0)
2009–2010	Víkingur	38	(10)
2011–2013	B36 Tórshavn	43	(8)
2014–2015	Víkingur	31	(12)
2016–2017	KÍ	19	(6)

International career^{‡}
1996–1997	U17 Faroe Islands	18	(2)
1998–1999	U19 Faroe Islands	5	(1)
2001–2013	Faroe Islands	54	(4)

Managerial career
- 2017: B68 Toftir
- * Club domestic league appearances and goals as of 1 January 2016 ‡ National team caps and goals as of 17 April 2015

Súni Olsen (born 7 March 1981) is a Faroese former professional football midfielder.

== Club career ==
He started his career at Faroese club GÍ Gøta, after a successful season in 2000, in which he scored 13 league goals, moved to Dutch side FC Zwolle in 2001, becoming the second Faroese international to play in the Netherlands after Jan Allan Müller played for Go Ahead Eagles in 1990/1991. He returned to GÍ in 2002, and after a prolific number of goals for a midfielder, he attracted the attention of Danish team AaB, where he was later joined by Faroese teammate Jón Rói Jacobsen. In 2008, he was allowed to leave to Viborg on a free transfer, after failing to break into the first-team squad at Aalborg. After a disappointing season at Viborg FF, he left Denmark and returned to the Faroe Islands at B36 Tórshavn. He played 2 games before he broke his foot and then did not play another match for B36. In October 2008, he agreed to leave B36 for Jógvan Martin Olsen's new side, Víkingur. In November 2015, Olsen signed for KÍ.

== International career ==
Olsen made his debut for the Faroe Islands national football team in January 2001, in a Nordic Championship match against Sweden, coming on as a substitute for Sámal Joensen. He played magnificently against Estonia in a friendly in Summer 2008, scoring one goal and making two assists, bringing the Faroe Islands level, after being 3–0 down at half time. On 15 October 2013, Suni Olsen retired from International football following a 2014 FIFA World Cup qualification match against Austria.

== International goals ==
Scores and results list Faroe Islands' goal tally first.

Goal	Date	Venue	Opponent	Score	Result	Competition
1	10 September 2003	Svangaskarð, Toftir, Faroe Islands	Lithuania	1–1	1–3	Euro 2004 Qualifying
2	4 June 2008	A. Le Coq Arena, Tallinn, Estonia	Estonia	3–3	3–4	Friendly
3	22 March 2009	Kópavogur, Iceland	Iceland	1–0	2–1	Friendly
4	9 September 2009	Svangaskarð, Toftir, Faroe Islands	Lithuania	1–0	2–1	2010 FIFA World Cup qualifying
