= Michał Kokoszanek =

Polish footballer

Personal information
- Date of birth: 27 June 1977 (age 49)
- Place of birth: Poznań, Poland
- Height: 1.87 m (6 ft 2 in)
- Position: Goalkeeper

Team information
- Current team: GES Sport Academy Poznań (youth goalkeeping coach)

Youth career
- SKS 13 Poznań

Senior career*
Years	Team	Apps	(Gls)
1997–2000	Lech Poznań	60	(0)
2000	Huragan Pobiedziska		
2001	Amica Wronki II		
2001–2002	Aluminium Konin		
2002	B68	17	(0)
- * Club domestic league appearances and goals

Michał Kokoszanek (born 27 June 1977) is a Polish former professional footballer who played as a goalkeeper. He is currently the goalkeeping coach of GES Sport Academy Poznań's youth teams.

== Career ==
=== Lech Poznań ===
Kokoszanek started his career with Polish top flight side Lech Poznań, where he made 62 appearances across all competitions. On 25 October 1997, Kokoszanek debuted for Lech Poznań in a 3–2 defeat to Stomil Olsztyn. On 15 August 1999, Kokoszanek let in a shot from 35 to 45 meters between his legs during a 1–1 draw with Legia Warsaw.

=== Later career ===
In 2000, Kokoszanek signed for Huragan Pobiedziska in the Polish third division. Before the 2002 season, he signed for Faroese club B68.
