= HJH =

HJH or Hjh may refer to:

- Hjh., abbreviation for honorific title Hajji
- HJH, division code for Hunjiang, Baishan, China
- Hereford Junior High, part of the Hereford Independent School District, Texas
- Hans Jacob Højgaard, Faroese composer
