= Fróði Benjaminsen =

Faroese footballer (born 1977)

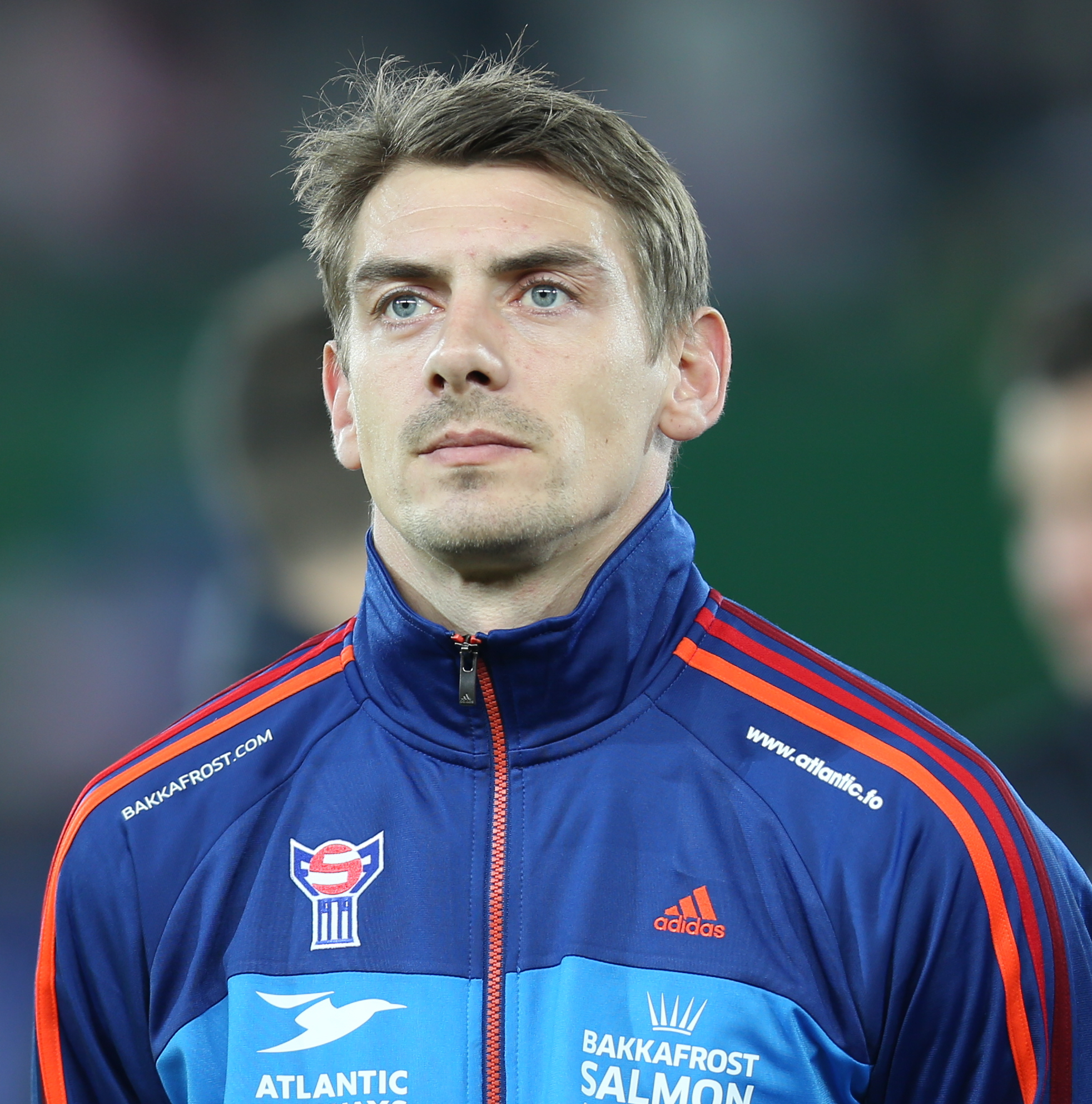
- Benjaminsen with the Faroe Islands in 2013

Personal information
- Date of birth: 14 December 1977 (age 48)
- Place of birth: Toftir, Faroe Islands
- Positions: Defender; midfielder

Team information
- Current team: KÍ Klaksvik (manager)

Senior career*
Years	Team	Apps	(Gls)
1994–2003	B68 Toftir	139	(37)
2004	Fram Reykjavík	16	(3)
2005–2007	B36 Tórshavn	77	(22)
2008–2016	HB Tórshavn	208	(76)
2017	Víkingur Gøta	21	(4)
2018	NSÍ Runavík	26	(4)
2019–2022	Skála	24	(2)
Total		511	(148)

International career
1994–1995	Faroe Islands U19	4	(0)
1999–2017	Faroe Islands	95	(6)

Managerial career
- 2023–2024: Faroe Islands U17
- 2025–: Faroe Islands U19
- 2025: B68 Toftir
- 2026–: KÍ Klaksvik
- * Club domestic league appearances and goals

Fróði Benjaminsen (born 14 December 1977) is a Faroese professional football manager and former player who played as a defender or midfielder. He is currently in charge of Faroe Islands Premier League club KÍ Klaksvik and the Faroe Islands national under-19 team.

As a player, Benjaminsen played for B68 Toftir, Fram Reykjavík, B36 Tórshavn, HB Tórshavn, Víkingur Gøta, NSÍ Runavík and Skála ÍF. He made 95 appearances for the Faroe Islands and captained the national team since 2008. In 2015, he retired from the national team, but continued to play at club level until 2022. On 16 August 2016, Benjaminsen came out of international retirement to play against Hungary in the FIFA World Cup 2018 qualification phase.

== Club career ==
In 2004, Benjaminsen transferred to Fram Reykjavík of the Icelandic Úrvalsdeild. On 20 December 2004, he signed a contract with B36 Tórshavn to return to his home country.

Benjaminsen retired from club and international football in October 2015, but on 10 March 2016, he came out of retirement and signed a one-year deal with HB Tórshavn.

== Career statistics ==
Scores and results list Faroe Islands' goal tally first, score column indicates score after each Benjaminsen goal.

List of international goals scored by Fróði Benjaminsen
No.	Date	Venue	Opponent	Score	Result	Competition
1	21 August 2002	Tórsvøllur, Tórshavn, Faroe Islands	Liechtenstein	2–1	3–1	Friendly
2	18 August 2004	Svangaskarð, Toftir, Faroe Islands	Malta	3–2	3–2	Friendly
3	22 March 2009	Kópavogur, Iceland	Iceland	1–0	2–1	Friendly
4	7 June 2011	Svangaskarð, Toftir, Faroe Islands	Estonia	1–0	2–0	UEFA Euro 2012 qualifying
5	6 September 2011	Stadion FK Partizan, Belgrade, Serbia]	Serbia	1–2	1–3	UEFA Euro 2012 qualifying
6	6 September 2013	Astana Arena, Astana, Kazakhstan	Kazakhstan	1–0	1–2	2014 FIFA World Cup qualification

== Honours ==
B36 Tórshavn

- Faroese League: 2005
- Faroese Cup: 2006
- Faroese Super Cup: 2007

Havnar Bóltfelag

- Faroese League: 2009, 2010, 2013.
- Faroese Super Cup: 2009, 2010

Víkingur

- Faroese League: 2017
- Faroese Super Cup: 2017

Individual

- Effodeildin Best Player: 2001, 2009, 2010, 2013
- Effodeildin Best Midfielder: 2013
- Team of the Year 2013
