= Dan Brimsvík =

Faroese football manager (born 1987)

Personal information
- Date of birth: 30 June 1987 (age 39)
- Place of birth: Faroe Islands

Managerial career
- Years: Team
- 2012–2013: B36 II
- 2014: Hvidovre (youth)
- 2015–2020: Lyngby (youth)
- 2020–2024: B36
- 2024–2025: 07 Vestur

Dan Brimsvík (born 30 June 1987) is a Faroese football manager who most renectly managed 07 Vestur.

== Career ==
He started his managerial career as a youth manager of Faroese side B36. He worked as the club's under-12 coach at the age of fifteen. He worked as their under-19 coach at the age of twenty-one. In 2012, he was appointed manager of the reserve team of Faroese side B36. In 2014, he was appointed as a youth manager of Danish side Hvidovre. In 2015, he was appointed as a youth manager of Danish side Lyngby.

In 2020, he was appointed manager of Faroese side B36. He helped the club win the 2021 Faroe Islands Cup. He was described as "characterized by the fact that he has not managed to win against the big [sides]... as it is usually taken for granted" while managing them. He helped them achieve fifth place during the 2021 season and fourth place during the 2022 season. In 2024, he was appointed manager of Faroese side 07 Vestur.

== Personal life ==
He was born on 30 June 1987 in the Faroe Islands. He has been regarded to use the 4-2-3-1 formation. He obtained a UEFA A License. He has worked as a referee.
