= Nicolai Dohn =

Danish footballer (born 1998)

Personal information
- Full name: Nicolai Møller Dohn
- Date of birth: 18 August 1998 (age 28)
- Place of birth: Skjød, Denmark
- Position: Midfielder

Team information
- Current team: B68 Toftir
- Number: 6

Youth career
- HGF Fodbold
- AGF
- 2015–2017: Horsens

Senior career*
Years	Team	Apps	(Gls)
2017–2018	Horsens	2	(0)
2018–2019	Nykøbing	31	(0)
2020–2023	Skive	99	(6)
2024	Skála ÍF	22	(1)
2025	07 Vestur	23	(5)
2026–	B68 Toftir	17	(2)
- * Club domestic league appearances and goals as of 1 November 2026

Nicolai Møller Dohn (born 18 August 1998) is a Danish footballer, who plays as a midfielder for Faroese club B68 Toftir.

== Youth career ==
Dohn was born in Skjød, and starting playing football at HGF Fodbold in a small town called Hammel. He later joined AGF and AC Horsens in 2015.

== Club career ==
=== AC Horsens ===
Dohn was the captain of the U19 team and trained occasionally with the first team.

He got his debut for AC Horsens on 8 October 2016. Dohn started on the bench, but replaced Joseph Mensah in the 54th minute in a 3–1 victory against Tarm IF in the Danish Cup.

The midfielder got his official debut for AC Horsens on 8 May 2017. Bech started on the bench, but came on the pitch in the 76th minute, replacing Kjartan Finnbogason in a 2–1 victory against Randers FC in the Danish Superliga. Only 2 days later, Dohn signed a new one-year contract with Horsens. This contract would mean, that he occasionally would be training with the first team, while finishing his school.

=== Nykøbing FC ===
Dohn signed for Nykøbing FC on 29 July 2018. On 27 November 2019 it was confirmed, that Dohn would leave the club at the end of the year.

=== Skive IK ===
As a free agent, Dohn signed with Skive IK on 1 February 2020. With a total of 104 games for Skive, Dohn left the club at the end of the 2022–23 season.

=== Faroe Islands ===
In January 2024, Dohn joined Faroese club Skála ÍF. A year later, ahead of the 2025 season, Dohn moved to 07 Vestur.
