= Tórður Thomsen =

Faroese footballer

Personal information
- Date of birth: 11 June 1986 (age 40)
- Place of birth: Runavík, Faroe Islands
- Position: Goalkeeper

Team information
- Current team: B68 Toftir
- Number: 1

Senior career*
Years	Team	Apps	(Gls)
2005	NSÍ Runavík	0	(0)
2005	ÍF Fuglafjørður	4	(0)
2006	B68 Toftir	26	(0)
2007	Argja Bóltfelag	1	(0)
2007–2009	NSÍ Runavík	29	(0)
2009–2010	Argja Bóltfelag	26	(0)
2010	Havnar Bóltfelag	7	(0)
2011	B68 Toftir	25	(0)
2012	ÍF Fuglafjørður	3	(0)
2012–2013	S.C. Egedal	?	(?)
2013–2018	B36 Tórshavn	118	(0)
2018–2023	NSÍ Runavík	105	(0)
2023–	B68 Toftir	81	(0)

International career^{‡}
2004	Faroe Islands U19	1	(0)
2010–	Faroe Islands	2	(0)
- * Club domestic league appearances and goals as of 1 November 2026 ‡ National team caps and goals as of 12 April 2023

Tórður Thomsen (born 11 June 1986) is a Faroese international footballer who plays for Faroese side B68 Toftir as a goalkeeper.

== Career ==
Born in Runavík, Thomsen began his senior career in 2005 with NSÍ Runavík, and has also played for ÍF Fuglafjørður, B68 Toftir and Argja Bóltfelag.

Thomsen made his international debut in 2010.

In 2012, he signed a contract with Danish side S.C. Egedal.
