= Loïck Lespinasse =

French footballer (born 2000)

Personal information
- Full name: Loïck Jean Henri Lespinasse
- Date of birth: 20 July 2000 (age 26)
- Place of birth: Bergerac, France
- Height: 1.82 m (6 ft 0 in)
- Position: Forward

Team information
- Current team: B68 Toftir
- Number: 9

Youth career
- 2018–2019: Genets Anglet
- 2019–2022: Real Sociedad Cantera

Senior career*
Years	Team	Apps	(Gls)
2022–2023	Real Sociedad B	33	(7)
2023–2025	Pau	2	(0)
2023–2025	Pau II	7	(2)
2025	Gungahlin United	3	(4)
2025–2026	Swift Hesperange	8	(0)
2026–	B68 Toftir	20	(9)
- * Club domestic league appearances and goals as of 1 November 2026

Loïck Lespinasse (born 20 July 2000) is a French professional footballer who plays as a forward for Faroe Islands Premier League club B68 Toftir. Born in France, he has previously played for Genêts Anglet, Real Sociedad and Pau.

== Career ==
Lespinnasse played at the Genêts Anglet from 2018 to 2019, then the forward joined the cantera of Real Sociedad, based in San Sebastián in 2019.

He signed his first professional contract in February 2021 and played with Real Sociedad B.

On 11 January 2023, Real Sociedad announced the transfer of Lespinasse to French club Pau Football Club of Ligue 2, where he signed a two-year contract.

Lespinasse made his debut on 22 January 2023, coming on as a substitute against Lille OSC during a 2–0 defeat in Coupe de France
