= Súni Fríði Barbá =

Icelandic footballer

Personal information
- Full name: Súni Fríði Barbá Johannesen
- Date of birth: 20 October 1972 (age 54)
- Position: Forward

Senior career*
Years	Team	Apps	(Gls)
1989–1991	NSÍ Runavík		
1992–1996	B68 Toftir		
1997	NSÍ Runavík		
1997	B68 Toftir		
1998–1999	HB		
2000–2001	B68 Toftir		
2002	GÍ Gøta		
2003–2004	B68 Toftir		
2004	NSÍ Runavík		
2005	AB		
2006	B68 Toftir		
2007	AB		
2007	FS Vágar		
2008–2009	B68 Toftir		
2010–2011	07 Vestur		
2011	FC Hoyvík		
2012–2014	MB		

International career
1993–1995	Faroe Islands	2	(0)

Managerial career
- 2007: AB (player-asst.manager)
- 2011: FC Hoyvík (player-manager)
- 2012–2014: MB (player-manager)
- 2015: B68 Toftir
- * Club domestic league appearances and goals

Súni Fríði Barbá Johannesen (born 20 October 1972) is a Faroese retired football striker and later manager. He became Faroese league top goalscorer in 1995 and 2000.
