= Hans Jacob Højgaard =

Faroese composer

Hans Jacob Højgaard (11 September 1904 – 10 June 1992) was a composer from the Faroe Islands in the 20th century. He was born in Toftir. When he was 15 years old, he went to sea and sailed with fishing boats for four years. He took a compulsory exam in Tórshavn in 1923. In 1924, he went to Denmark, where he attended Karise Folk High School. In 1929, he received a teaching degree from the Jonstrup's Seminar. He then returned to his birthplace, Toftir. He was an assistant teacher from 1929 to 1931, a secondary teacher from 1931 to 1933, and a school director from 1934 to 1953. He died in Tórshavn, aged 87.

Højgaard was a chorister in Toftir and Tórshavn and composed numerous Faroese songs and hymns. He continued and refined the "ko sang" tradition that existed in the Faroe Islands as a teacher and choreographer. Højgaard's songs are distinguished by their freshness and romanticism. They have a style reminiscent of the peculiar tones that characterize old Faroese quadrilles and hymns.

Højgaard was an honorary member of the Harbors Song Event in 1978.

== Works ==
- 1951 – Føroysk Songløg I (Faroese Trad. Music Tunebook)
- 1977 – Føroysk Songløg II (Faroese Trad. Music Tunebook)

== Recordings ==
- 1976 – LP: "Í hesi sælu jólatíð", (Faroese Christmas Carols, HJH directing his own Melodies/Compositions), HCW TÓRGARÐ
- 2003 – CD: "Í hesi sælu jólatíð", (Faroese Christmas Carols, HJH directing his own Melodies/Compositions), HCW TÓRGARÐ
- 2003 – CD: Komponisten Hans Jákup Højgaard, musikeksempel, (Musical examples of HJH Compositions) RAES, Faroese Radio
- 2004 – CD: Hans Jacob Højgaard 100 ár, (100-Year Anniversary) TUTL

== Literature ==
- S. Anderssohn: Komponisten Hans Jákup Højgaard, et liv som traditionsbærer, nyskaber og lærer, Research Archive for Ethnomusicological Studies [RAES], Arendal 2003 (Danish)
