= Tórsvøllur =

Football stadium in Tórshavn, Faroe Islands

Coordinates: 62°1′9″N 6°46′41″W

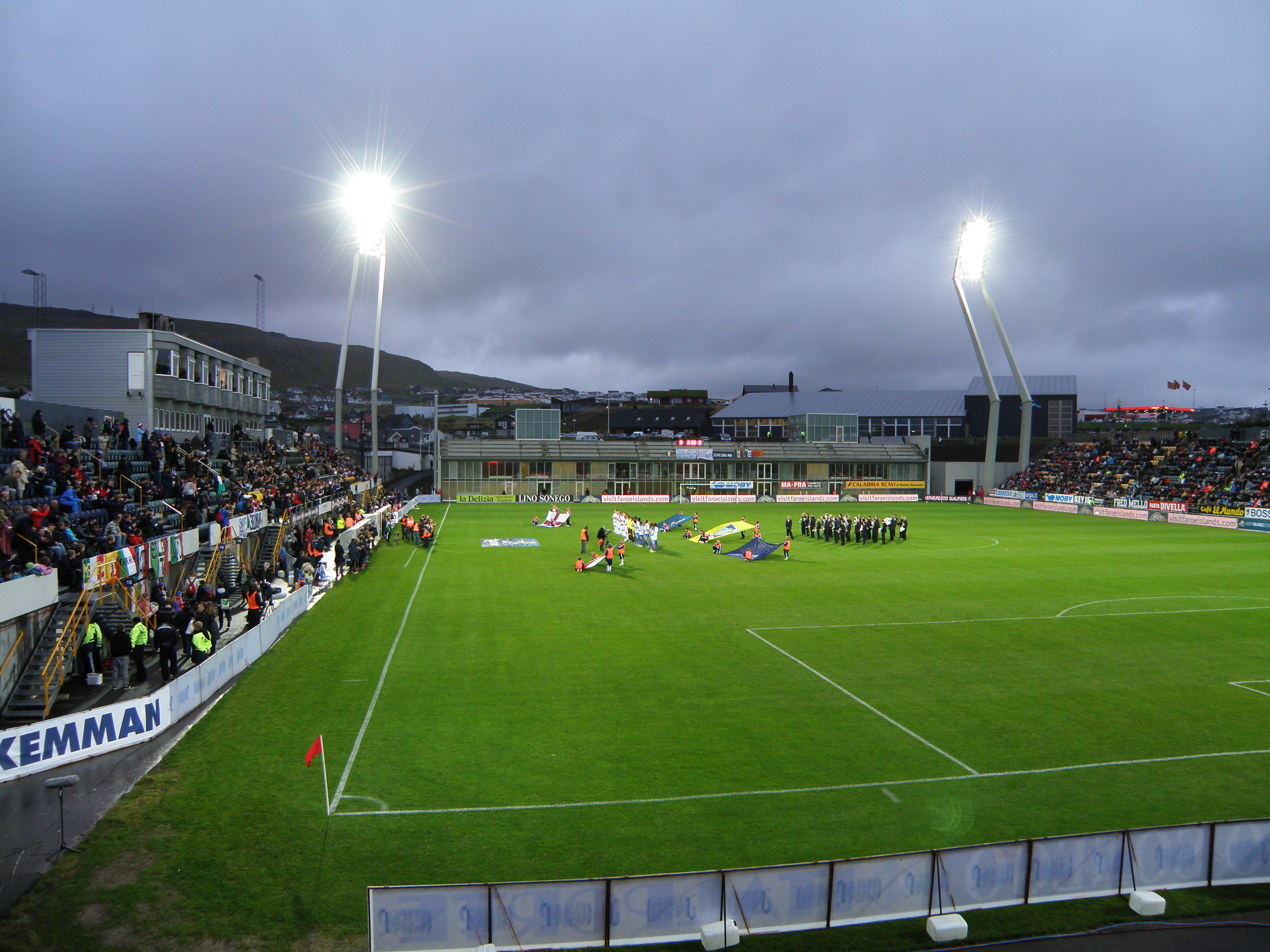
- Interactive map of Tórsvøllur
- Full name: Tórsvøllur
- Capacity: 6,500 (all-seater)
- Surface: Artificial grass
- Field size: 100 m × 65 m (109 yd × 71 yd)

Construction
- Built: 1999
- Opened: 9 July 1999
- Renovated: 2010–2021
- Architect: Fenwick Iribarren Architects

Tenant
- Faroe Islands national football team

Tórsvøllur is a football stadium on the sport site of Gundadalur in Tórshavn, the capital of the Faroe Islands. The stadium holds 6,500 people, and was built in 1999 to become the country's national stadium to provide an artificial grass surface on which international football matches could be played. Previously, the Faroe Islands national team played its home matches in the town of Toftir at Svangaskarð stadium.

== History ==
Tórsvøllur officially opened on 9 July 1999 with a friendly between the Faroe Islands national football team and Danish side Aalborg Boldspilklub. A new stand was constructed with a multifunctional office building and a small seating section behind one goal in 2009. In August 2011, floodlights were introduced; these were first officially used for the football match between Faroe Islands and Italy on 2 September 2011. Though the stadium originally had a natural grass playing surface, artificial turf was added in 2012. In 2014, another new stand was added at another end, replacing a temporary tubular structure. A total renovation of the stadium was completed in 2021. The renovation included a new west stand with a media room, dressing room and 1,730 capacity.
