= Bill McLeod Jacobsen =

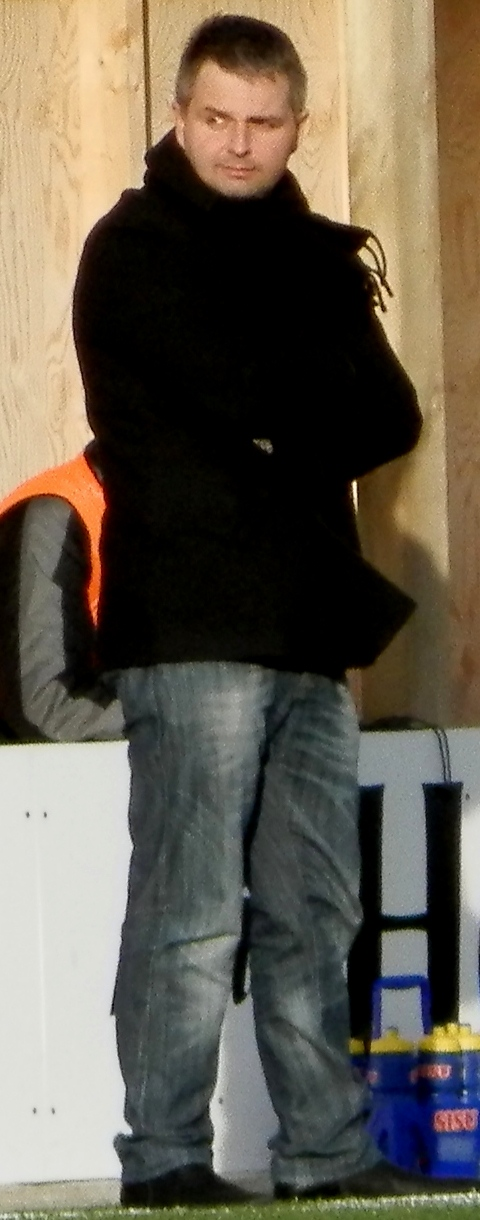

Personal information
- Full name: William "Bill" McLeod Jacobsen
- Date of birth: 30 November 1974 (age 51)
- Place of birth: Klaksvík, Faroe Islands

Team information
- Current team: Faroe Islands under-21 (Manager)

Managerial career
- Years: Team
- 1987–1994: KÍ Klaksvík (Youth Manager)
- 1995–1998: Esbjerg fB (Youth Manager)
- 2000–2000: KÍ Klaksvík (Assistant Manager)
- 1998–2007: Faroe Islands youth teams (Manager)
- 2002–2002: NSÍ Runavík (Assistant Manager)
- 2007–2011: B68 Toftir (Manager)
- 2012: B68 Toftir (Manager)
- 2013: TB Tvøroyri (Manager)
- 2014: AB Argir (Manager)
- 2018: B68 Toftir (Manager)
- 2020: Skála ÍF (Manager)
- 2021: NSÍ Runavík (Manager)
- 2024–2025: FC Hoyvík (Manager)

Bill McLeod Jacobsen (born 30 November 1974 in Klaksvík, Faroe Islands) is a Faroese football coach. He was head coach of the Faroe Islands national under-21 football team along with Heðin Askham. He was first appointed in 2007.

Under his coaching, the Faroe Islands under-21 team finished the 2009-2010 qualification campaign with a total of 11 points, which is the highest any Faroese national team have achieved during qualification stages.

== Career in the Faroese FA ==
In 1998, Jacobsen was appointed as assistant coach for the Faroe Islands national under-16 team. This was the start of his career with Faroe Islands FA (Fótbóltssamband Føroya) where he was the head coach for the Faroe Islands national under-14, under-17, and under-19 before he and Heðin Askham got the job as head coaches for the Faroe Islands under-21 team.

Jacobsen was also the Assistant Manager for the Faroe Islands senior national football team for one match. For personal reasons, the assistant manager of the Faroe Islands national team couldn’t be there for an away game against Switzerland in 2001. Bill McLeod Jacobsen was asked to replace him for that match and worked with former European Footballer of the Year (1977) Allan Simonsen, who was then head coach of the Faroe Islands national team.

== Club career ==
Jacobsen also has a long career on the club level. In 2008-2011 he was the manager for B68 Toftir, and in 2009 he won the title as Manager of the Year on the Faroe Islands. Before being B68’s manager, Bill McLeod Jacobsen was an assistant manager for NSÍ Runavík (2002) working with manager Jógvan Martin Olsen, former Faroese National team coach, and assistant manager for KÍ Klaksvík (2000) where he worked with manager Tomislav Sivic, who's a former manager for Serbia’s national under-21 football team and under-19 team.

On the youth level, Jacobsen also has experience with both Faroese and Danish teams. From 1987 to 1994, Jacobsen was the head coach for several of KÍ Klaksvík’s youth teams, and from 1995 to 1998 he was the youth team coach in Esbjerg fB in Denmark.

Jacobsen has held a UEFA A coaching license since 2006. He has worked for the Faroe Islands Football Association for 13 years and has also gained coaching experience at club level in both the Faroe Islands and Denmark. He has been regarded as one of the more experienced football managers from the Faroe Islands.
