= Jákup á Borg =

Faroese footballer and manager (born 1979)

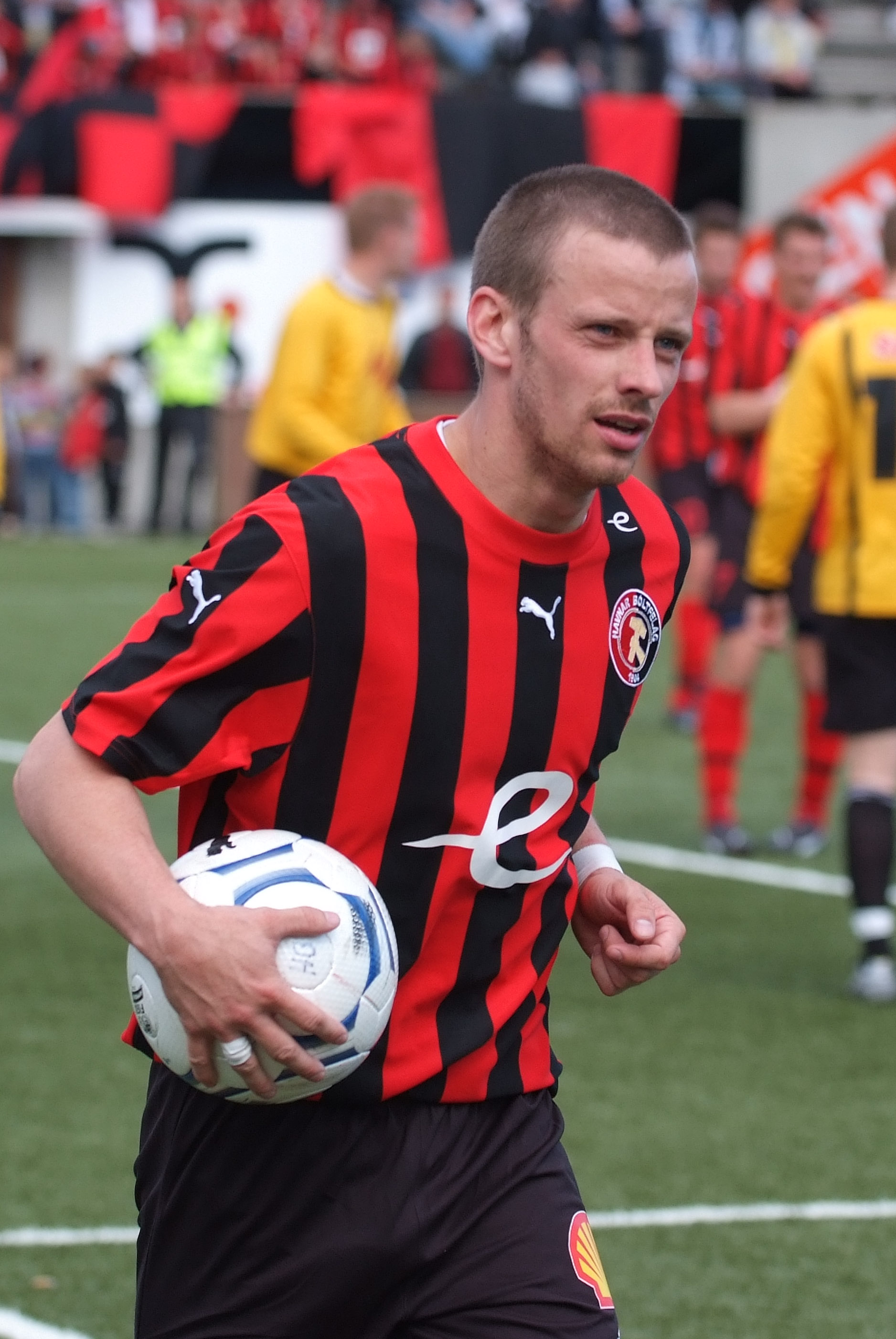
- Jákup á Borg

Personal information
- Date of birth: 26 October 1979 (age 47)
- Place of birth: Tórshavn, Faroe Islands
- Height: 1.79 m (5 ft 10 in)
- Positions: Winger; striker

Team information
- Current team: B36 Tórshavn
- Number: 9

Youth career
- B36 Tórshavn

Senior career*
Years	Team	Apps	(Gls)
1996–2003	B36 Tórshavn	130	(70)
2003–2004	→ Odense BK (loan)	1	(0)
2004–2008	HB Tórshavn	94	(32)
2008–2016	B36 Tórshavn	165	(50)

International career^{‡}
1998–2009	Faroe Islands	62	(2)
- * Club domestic league appearances and goals as of 17 May 2016 ‡ National team caps and goals as of 14 April 2015

Jákup á Borg (born 26 October 1979) is a Faroese football manager and former footballer (midfielder or striker) He last played for Faroe Islands Premier League team B36 Tórshavn, and currently manages B68 Toftir.

== Club career ==
Once hailed as Faroe Islands biggest talent, he made his debut in Faroese football with B36 Tórshavn as a defender on 28 April 1996 and soon became a prolific striker. His goals earned him trials at Liverpool and Watford and eventually a loan move to Danish league side Odense BK but he returned home after only one unsuccessful season. á Borg was Faroese league top goalscorer in the 1998 and 1999 seasons.

In 2006, Borg was named the Faroese Premier League Footballer of the Year. In 2015, he started his 20th season in the Faroese league.

á Borg became the Faroese Premier League leading goal scorer on 12 April 2015 when he scored his 148th goal, in his 20th season in the Faroese league.

== International career ==
á Borg made his debut for the Faroe Islands in an August 1998 European Championship qualifying match against Bosnia. He has earned 62 caps, scoring 2 goals and has represented his country in 23 FIFA World Cup qualification matches. He usually played on the right wing for the national team.

He announced his retirement from International football in July 2010 and had final appearance in a Faroese shirt against Estonia in August 2010. However, in early 2012 he made himself available for a possible selection again.

=== International goals ===
Scores and results list Faroe Islands' goal tally first.

#	Date	Venue	Opponent	Score	Result	Competition
1	27 April 2003	Svangaskarð, Toftir, Faroe Islands	Kazakhstan	1-0	3-2	Friendly
2	18 August 2004	Svangaskarð, Toftir, Faroe Islands	Malta	1-0	3-2	Friendly
