= Jógvan Martin Olsen =

Faroese footballer and manager

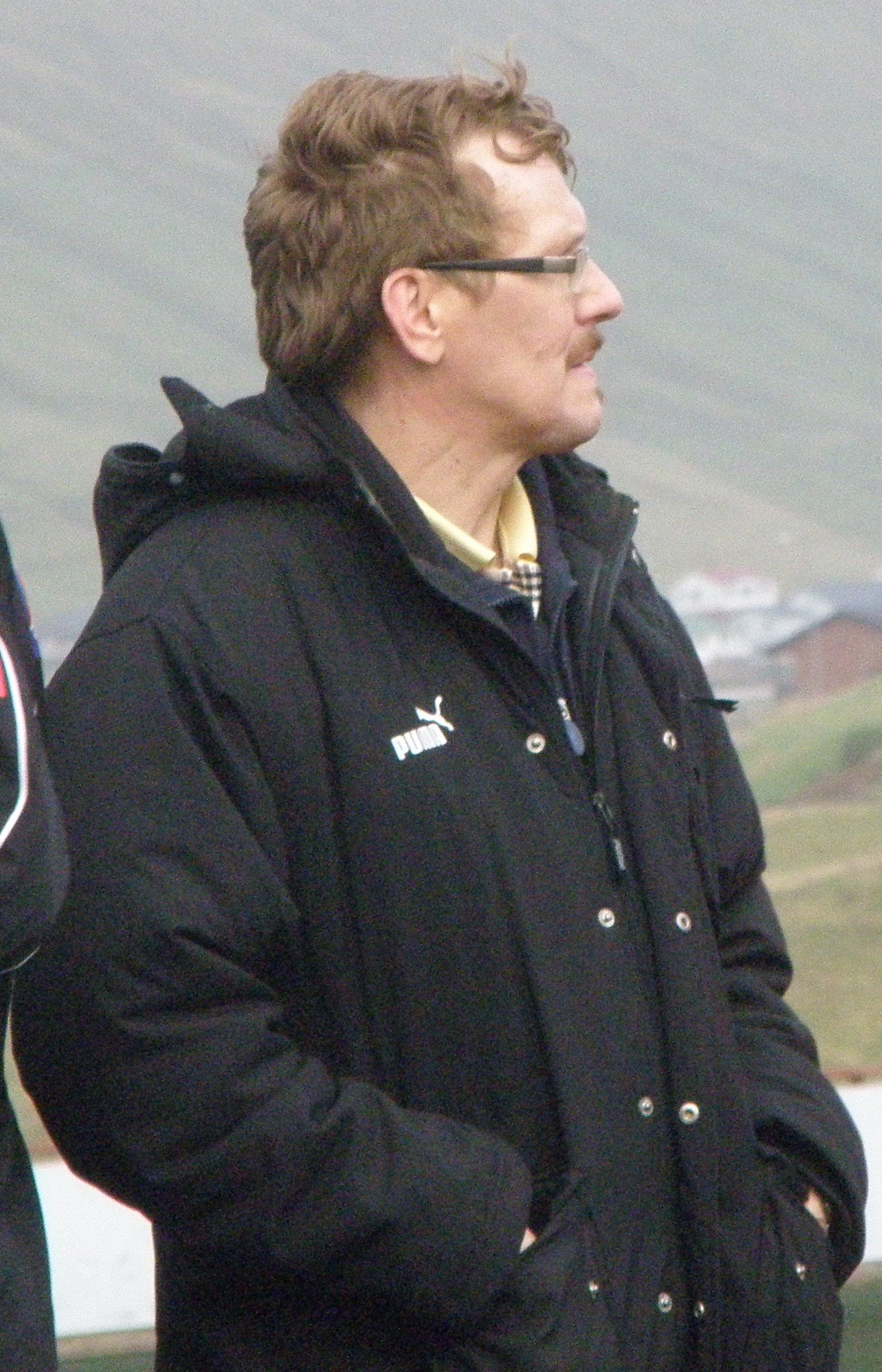
- Olsen coaching Víkingur Gøta in 2010

Personal information
- Full name: Jógvan Martin Olsen
- Date of birth: 10 July 1961 (age 65)
- Place of birth: Toftir, Faroe Islands
- Height: 1.81 m (5 ft 11 in)
- Position: Midfielder

Senior career*
Years	Team	Apps	(Gls)
1979–1993	B68	145	(23)
1994–1995	LÍF Leirvík	21	(6)
1996–1997	B68 II	4	(1)

Managerial career
- 1996–2005: Faroe Islands (assistant)
- 2002–2004: NSÍ Runavík
- 2006–2008: Faroe Islands
- 2009–2013: Víkingur Gøta
- 2014: B68
- 2016–2024: ÍF Fuglafjørður
- * Club domestic league appearances and goals

Jógvan Martin Olsen (born 10 July 1961) is a Faroese football manager and former player who is the manager of ÍF Fuglafjørður since October 2015. He was the head coach of the Faroe Islands national team.

== Playing career ==
Olsen was born in Toftir, Faroe Islands. A midfielder, played with B68 Toftir from 1978 to 1993 and again from 1996 to 1997 and for LÍF Leirvík 1994 and 1995. Three times Olsen won the national Faroese championship with B68 Toftir: 1984, 1985 and 1992.

== Managerial career ==
Olsen was the assistant coach of the Faroe Islands national team during the reign of Allan Simonsen and Henrik Larsen (both from Denmark) in the period 1996–2005. From 2002 to 2004 he was also the manager of NSÍ Runavík. In 2005 Olsen was named new head coach of the Faroe Islands national team. He resigned on 29 September 2008.

In 2013 Olsen announced that he would step down as coach at the end of the season and have a year off from football. In October 2015 he was appointed manager of ÍF Fuglafjørður.

== Managerial statistics ==
As of 16 June 2016

Team	Nat	From	To	Record				
Team	Nat	From	To	G	W	D	L	Win %
Faroe Islands	(Faroe Islands)	2006	2008	20	0	1	19	0.00
