= 07 Vestur =

- Full name: 07 Vestur
- Founded: 6 November 2007; 18 years ago
- Ground: á Dungasandi
- Capacity: 2,000
- Chairman: Jón Nordendal
- Manager: Tór-Ingar Akselsen
- League: Faroe Islands Premier League
- 2025: Faroe Islands Premier League, 8th of 10
Home colours	Away colours

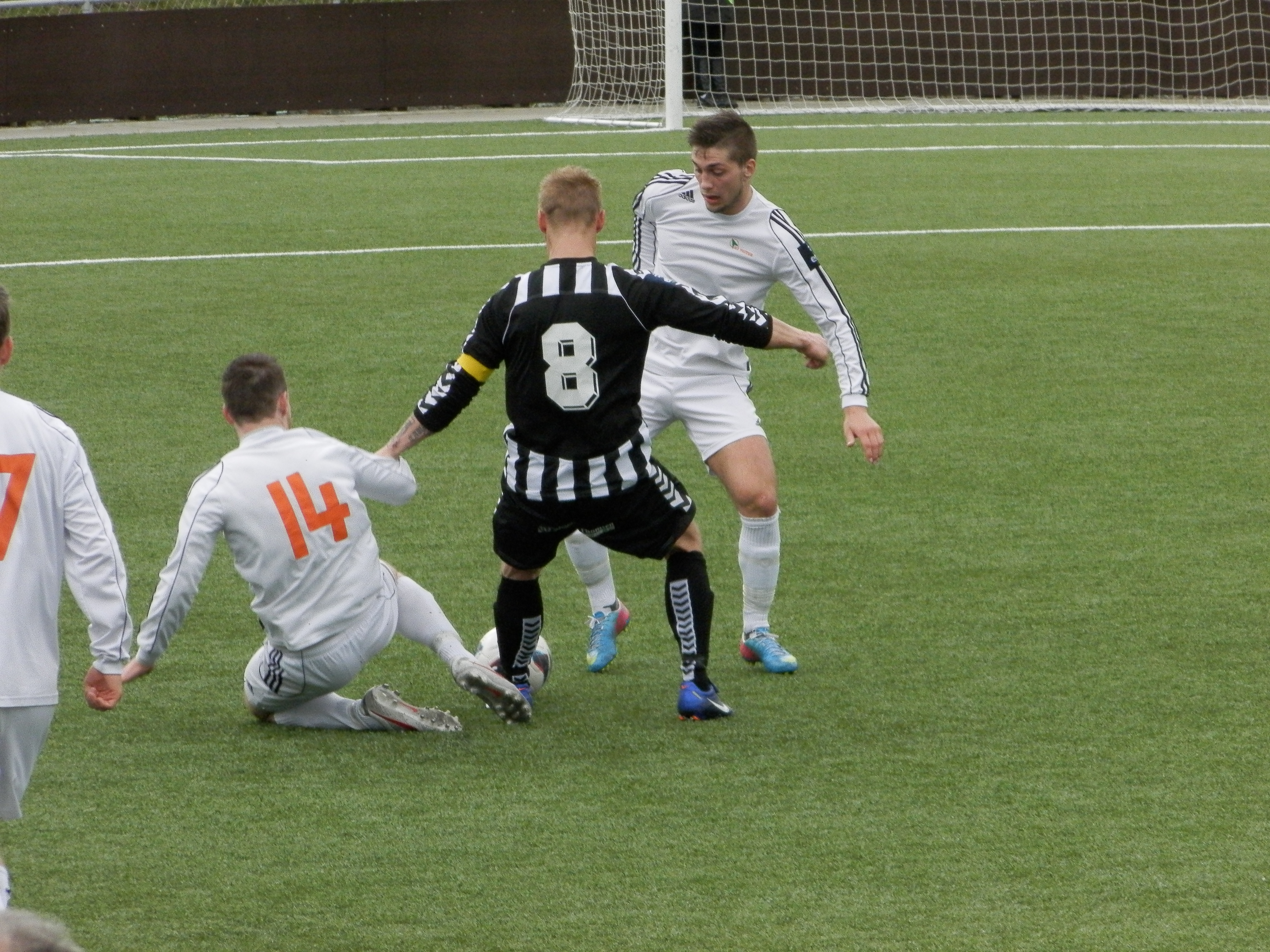
07 Vestur (in white) vs. TB Tvøroyri, Effodeildin in May 2013.

07 Vestur is a Faroese football club, which was founded in 2007. It is located in Sandavágur and Sørvágur on Vágar island.

== History ==
The club was founded 18 December 1993 as FS Vágar. It was a merger of Vágar island teams MB Miðvágur and SÍF Sandavágur in order to increase the footballing standard of this part of the Faroe Islands. SÍ Sørvágur, also located on Vágar, joined the club in 1998. Soon, the newly founded club promoted to the national top league which, at that point in 1995, was called 1. deild. Unfortunately, the team was not able to permanently secure a top-tier spot over the years. In 2003, FS Vágar was relegated for good. Soon after that, the alliance between the three founding clubs began to crumble, and FS Vágar was eventually disbanded in the fall of 2004.

Despite the controversy, many people wanted to keep the club alive or, if this was not possible, found another club. So, on 8 November 2004, the club was re-founded as FS Vágar 2004 (FSV04). In fall 2007, talks about a merger between FSV04 and SÍ Sørvágur, one of the members of the first incarnation of the club, started and were successfully concluded on 6 November 2007. The club was renamed 07 Vestur, shortly afterwards. The new name refers both to the founding year of the new club and the location of Vágar island, which is approximately 7° W.

The club currently maintains two men's teams and also a women's team. In 2009, the men's first team played in the Faroe Islands Premier League, but they were relegated and played in 1. deild in 2010. They won 1. deild and were promoted to the Premier League; in 2011, they were playing in the Premier League of Faroese football, but again they remained there for only one season, they ended as 9th with 24 points and got relegated to 1. deild. The first-team gained promotion to Effodeildin in 2012 after winning 1. deild with 68 points. In 2013, the team was relegated to 1. deild again and played there until they were promoted again after the 2016 season.

== Honours ==
1. deild

- Winners: 1999, 2002, 2008, 2010, 2012

== Current squad ==
As of 15 August 2026

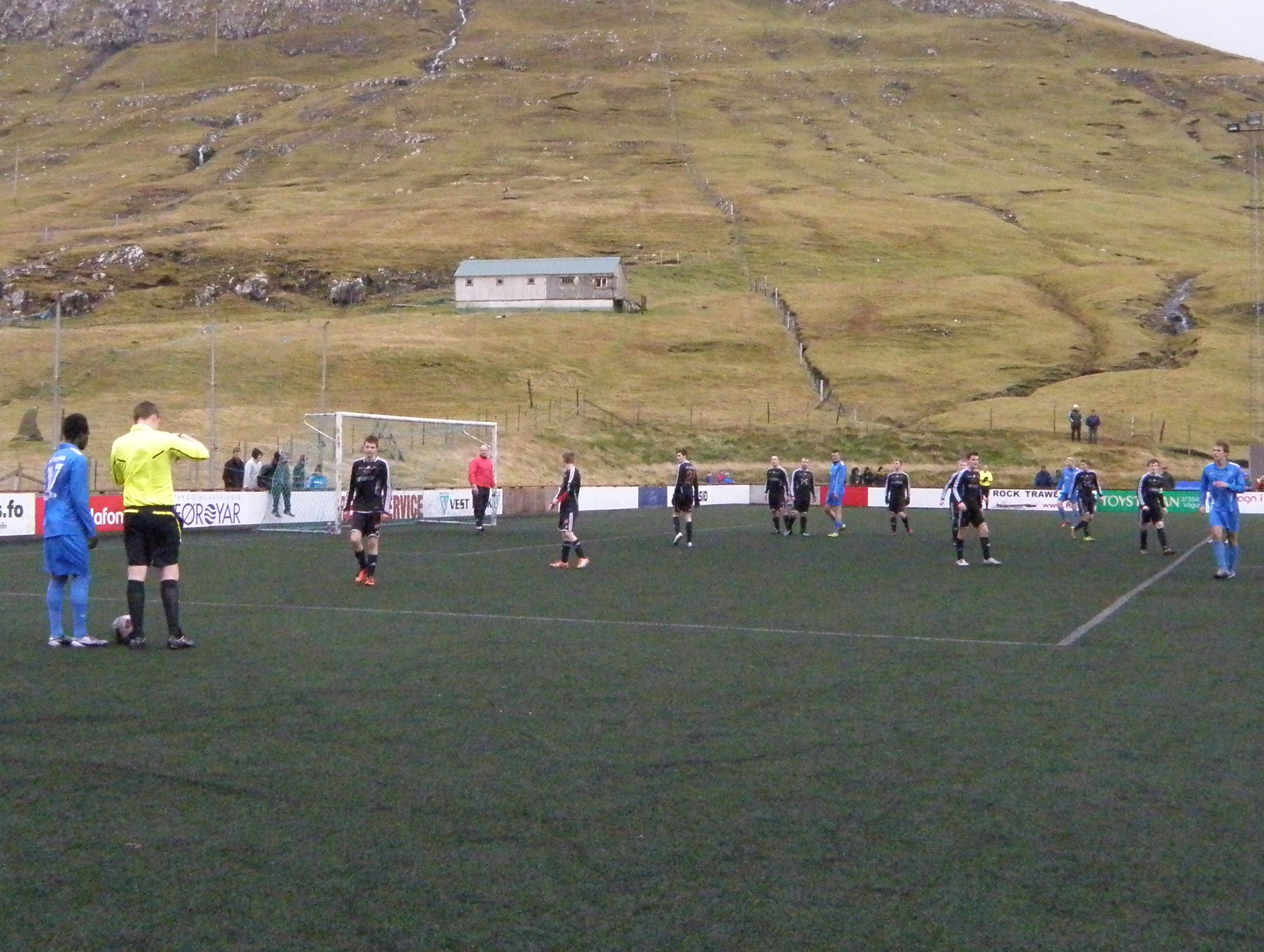
07 Vestur 1. deild vs. FC Suðuroy, October 2011

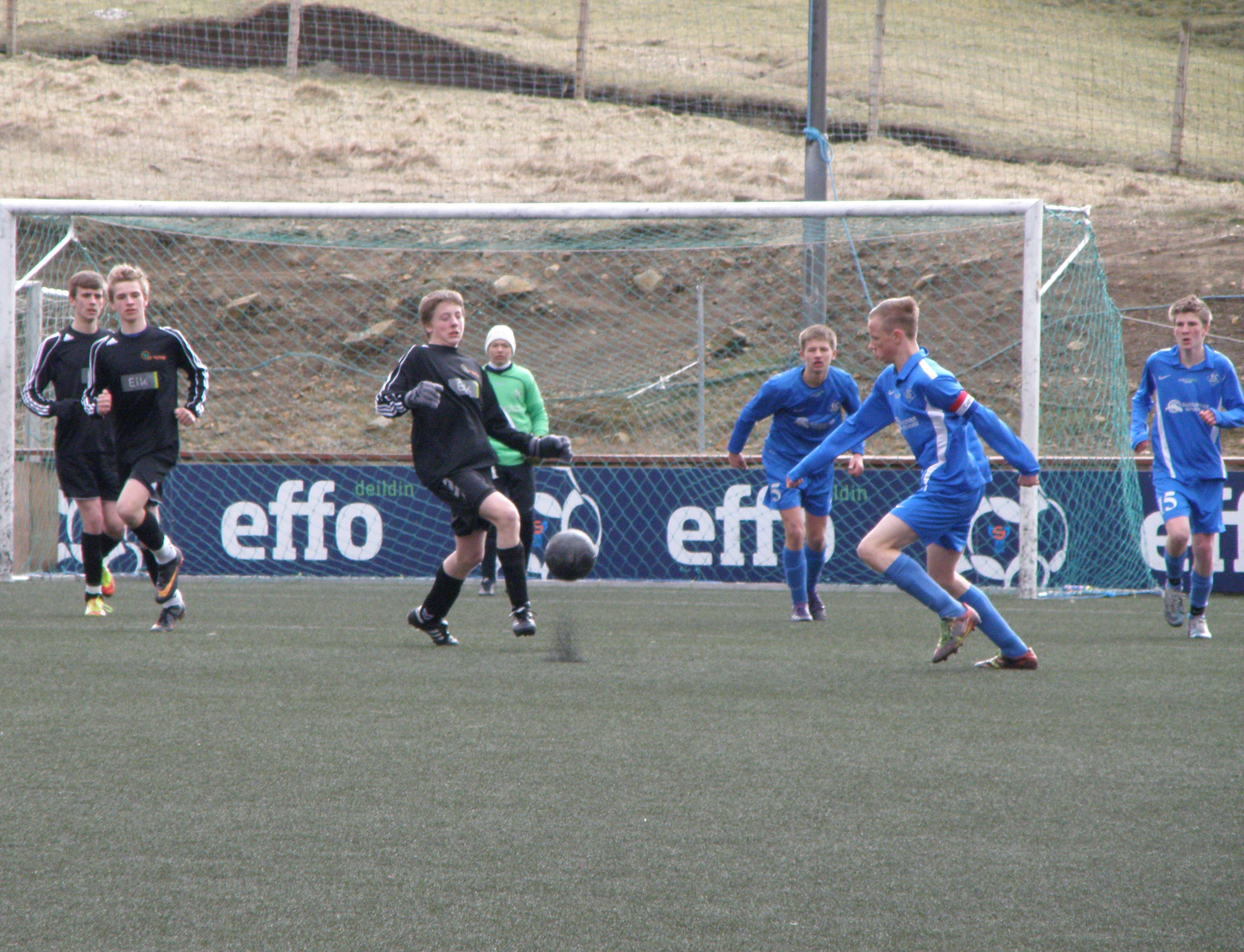
07 Vestur vs FC Suðuroy, Boys U16, April 2012

Note: Flags indicate national team as defined under FIFA eligibility rules; some limited exceptions apply. Players may hold more than one non-FIFA nationality.

No.	Pos.	Nation	Player
1	GK	DEN	Sebastian Wille
2	DF	FRO	Rói Olsen
4	DF	FRO	Dann Fróðason
5	DF	FRO	Sonni Nattestad
6	DF	FRO	Eiler Fróðason
7	FW	BEL	Jasper Van Der Heyden
8	DF	FRO	Høgni Nielsen
9	FW	SWE	Jonathan Flensborg
10	MF	FRO	Janus Samuelsen
11	DF	DEN	Casper Gedsted
12	GK	FRO	Sámal á Steig
14	MF	FRO	Hjalmar Gudmundsen

No.	Pos.	Nation	Player
15	DF	FRO	Rasmus Helgason
17	MF	BRA	Paulo Vitor
18	DF	FRO	Jónas Prior
19	DF	FRO	Jon i Horni Nielsen
20	MF	FRO	Jónas Nordendal
21	FW	ISL	Elvar Petersen
22	DF	NOR	Ola Arntsen
23	DF	FRO	Jóannis á Steig
24	MF	FRO	Edvin Jakobsen
28	FW	FRO	Lucas Gardar
30	DF	DEN	Oliver Klemensen
52	MF	FRO	Magnus Jacobsen

=== Out on loan ===
Note: Flags indicate national team as defined under FIFA eligibility rules; some limited exceptions apply. Players may hold more than one non-FIFA nationality.

No.	Pos.	Nation	Player

== Notable former players ==
National players

- Torkil Nielsen – former national player for the Faroe Islands; scored the goal for the Faroe Islands in 1990 in the match against Austria, which Faroe Islands won 1–0.

== Managers ==
- (Denmark) Tommy Christiansen (1990)
- (Denmark) Finn Røntved (1995)
- (Faroe Islands) Albert Ellefsen & Páll Fróði Joensen (1995)
- (Faroe Islands) Albert Ellefsen (1996)
- (Poland) Piotr Krakowski (1997)
- (Lithuania) Kęstutis Latoža (2000–01)
- (Faroe Islands) Albert Ellefsen (2001)
- (Faroe Islands) Suni á Dalbø (2002)
- (Faroe Islands) Albert Ellefsen (2002–03)
- (Faroe Islands) Jógvan Nordbúð (2004)
- (Faroe Islands) Bill McLeod Jacobsen (2005–06)
- (Faroe Islands) Hegga Samuelsen (2006)
- (Faroe Islands) Jan Dam (2007)
- (Poland) Piotr Krakowski (January 1, 2008 – December 31, 2009)
- (Faroe Islands) Hegga Samuelsen (October 1, 2010 – May 27, 2011)
- (Faroe Islands) Jóhan Nielsen (June 1 – Dec 31, 2011)
- (Poland) Piotr Krakowski (Jan 1, 2012 – 2013)
- (Faroe Islands) Hegga Samuelsen (2014—2016)
- (Faroe Islands) Trygvi Mortensen (2017)
- (Faroe Islands) Pauli Poulsen (2018)
- (Norway) Julian Madsen (2019—2020)
- (Faroe Islands) Heðin Askham (2020—2021)
- (Sweden) Magnus Powell (2021)
- (Denmark) Michael Schjønberg (2022—2023)
- (Norway) Lars Arne Nilsen (2023)
- (Norway) Steffen Landro (2024)
- (Faroe Islands) Dan Brimsvík (2024—2025)
- (Denmark) Michael Schjønberg (2025—2026)
- (Faroe Islands) Tór-Ingar Akselsen (2026—Present)
