= Toftir =

- Village
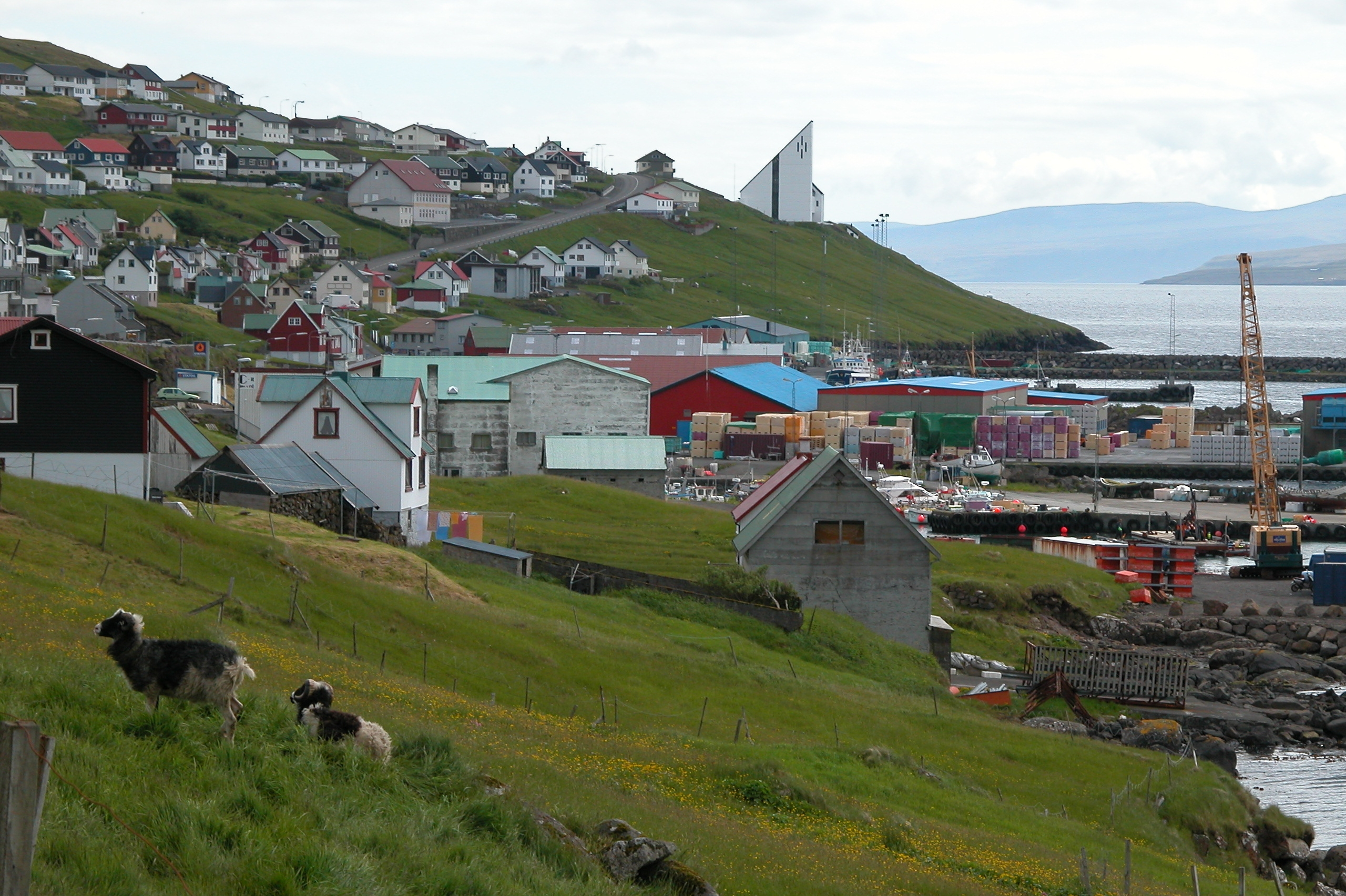
- Toftir in late June 2004

- Location in the Faroe Islands
- Coordinates: 62°5′20″N 6°44′8″W
- State: Kingdom of Denmark
- Constituent country: Faroe Islands
- Island: Eysturoy
- Municipality: Nes Municipality

Population (September 2025)
  - Total: 1,067
- Time zone: GMT
  - Summer (DST): UTC+1 (EST)
- Postal code: FO 650
- Climate: Cfc

Toftir (Danish: Tofte) Faroese: [ˈtʰɔftəɹ] is a village in Nes Municipality on the island of Eysturoy, in the Faroe Islands. It is part of a chain of villages stretching over a distance of 10 kilometers on the east side of Skálafjørður (fjord) on Eysturoy island. The highest hill in Toftir, called Húkslond, is 129 meters high, and Nes Municipality is the only area in the Faroes which has no mountains above 200 meters.

The Lake Toftir area was the first area in the Faroe Islands to become a Nature reserve in the 1980s, and in 2006 Nes Municipality, in cooperation with neighbouring Runavík Municipality, joined a network of local authorities in the Nordic countries working to halt the loss of biodiversity in their local areas.

== History ==
The settlement of Toftir dates back to the landnám (settlement) period. According to local lore, only one woman survived the Black Death (1348–1350), which left the village in ruins; hence the name Toftir, meaning "ruins". The village name prior to the Black Death is said to have been Hella, meaning "slope", which refers to the gradual sloping hillside on which the village is built.

== Local economy ==
Toftir has one major retail store with late opening hours, one café Í Hópinum, which serves liquor, and a shop, Navia which sells woollens and also souvenirs. Toftir has a relatively large harbour with a filleting plant that opened in 1969, and hosts the headquarters of Faroe Fish Market.

== Fredericks Church ==
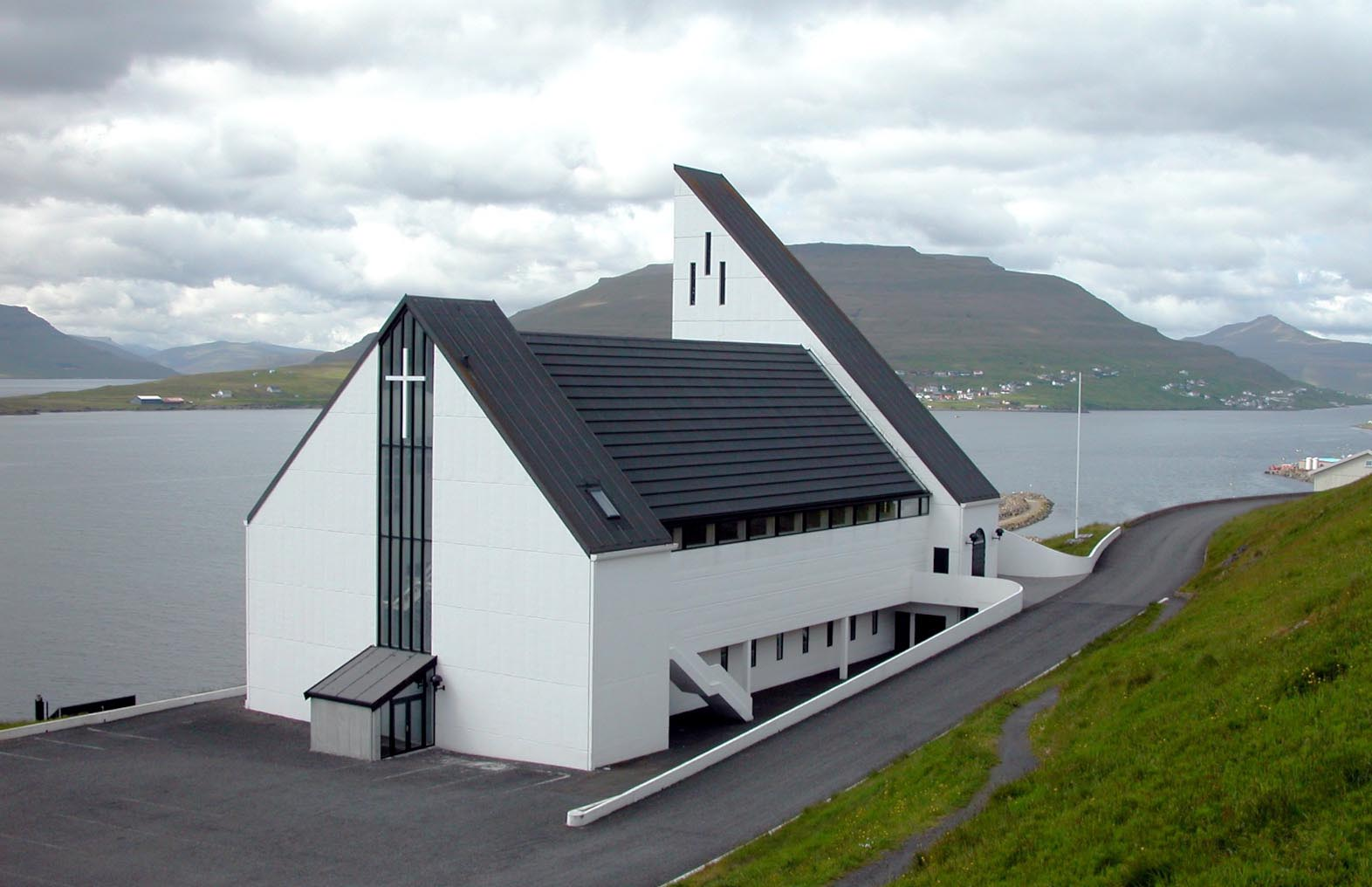
Frederik's Church in Nes

Fredericks Church (Fríðrikskirkjan) (CotFI) in Nes was completed in 1994 and was named in honor of Fríðrikur Petersen (1853-1917) who served as rural dean on Nes from 1900 to 1917.

Other local religious communities include the Inner mission which is a revivalist movement of the Plymouth Brethren and the Baháʼí Community.

== Sport ==
The major sports venue in Toftir is the Svangaskarð, the first of its kind in the Faroe Islands. Like most Faroese settlements, Toftir used to participate in the National Rowing sport of the Faroe Islands, but ceased participating in this sport in the 1980s. The village's football team, B68 Toftir, was established in 1962 and has won the Faroese league 3 times, in 1984, 1985 and 1992.

The local swimming club Flot was established in 1984; it participates in the national swimming competitions in the islands. In 2009 a Volleyball team was established in Toftir; in 2010 the name Ternan was chosen for the team. Toftir is also home to one of the pioneering chess clubs in the islands, Tofta Talvfelag which has won the Islands' Chess Championships once. The Toftir Boat Association (Bátafelagið) was established on 13 March 2005, and two months later the first Boat Festival was held in Toftir; it is now held every year on the first weekend of May.

== People from Toftir ==
- Fróði Benjaminsen, footballer
- Jóan Símun Edmundsson, footballer
- Øssur Hansen, footballer
- Hans Jacob Højgaard (1904–1992), composer
- Heri Joensen, musician, singer, guitarist and founder of the band Týr
- Jógvan Martin Olsen, footballer
- Johan Poulsen (1890–1980), teacher and politician

== See also ==
- List of towns in the Faroe Islands
