= Svangaskarð =

Multi-purpose stadium in Toftir, Faroe Islands

Coordinates: 62°05′59″N 6°44′10″W

- Tofta Leikvøllur
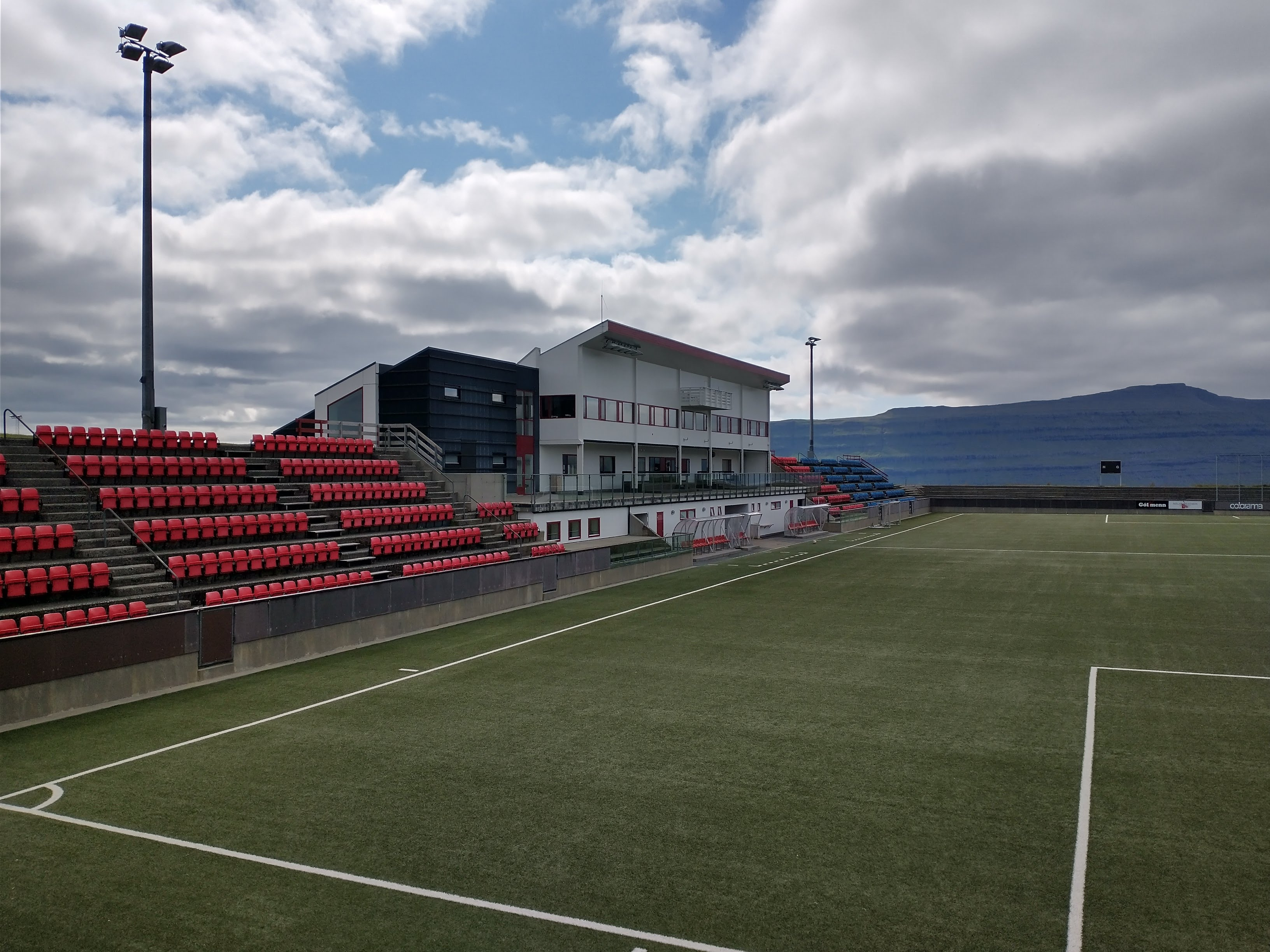
- Interactive map of Svangaskarð
- Full name: Svangaskarð
- Location: Toftir, Faroe Islands
- Capacity: 6,000
- Surface: Grass

Construction
- Built: 1980
- Opened: 1980

Tenants
- Faroe Islands; B68 Toftir

Svangaskarð (pronounced [ˈsvɛŋkaskɛaɹ]), also referred to as Tofta Leikvøllur, is a multi-purpose stadium in Toftir, Faroe Islands with two football fields and a sports arena for athletics around the lower field. It is currently used mostly for football matches. The stadium holds 6,000 people. It was the sole home ground of the Faroe Islands national football team from 1991 and until the Tórsvøllur Stadium was built in the capital Tórshavn in 1999 and is still occasionally used for international football matches.

== History ==
The stadium on Svangaskarð was first opened in 1980. It was just a gravel pitch for the first few years. The stadium facilities were somewhat rudimentary in 1980; there wasn't any building to house the changing rooms, just a simple hut. In 1984 they built some proper changing room facilities for the players, the same year B68 Toftir won their first Faroese Championship. In 1987 artificial grass was laid on the pitch and two years later, on 8 July 1989, they added an athletics strip around the football field in time for the Island Games which were held in the Faroe Islands for the first time. A grass pitch was first laid in 1990 to 1991. The work started in November 1990 shortly after the Faroe Islands won against Austria in Landskrona in Sweden. There was no football pitch in the Faroe Islands which met the high standards of UEFA at the time when the Faroe Islands first started to play international football. But the people of Toftir wanted to change that, so they started to modernise the stadium and equip it with all the necessary amenities that were required by UEFA in order to host international matches. They laid a new football pitch over the old one. The seating stands around the old pitch were replaced and the new pitch and the stands were officially opened on 20 October 1991 when the Faroe Islands national football team played against a specially chosen team.

The record attendance for a football match in the Faroe Islands was set at the stadium in 1998 when the Faroe Islands won 2–1 against Malta, the attendance was 6,642. The Svangaskarð stadium also hosts the home matches of B68 Toftir and international matches of Faroese teams which are based in towns closer to Toftir than to the capital, like NSÍ and KÍ.
