= B68 Toftir =

Association football club

- Full name: Tofta Ítróttarfelag, B68
- Founded: 21 December 1962; 63 years ago
- Ground: Svangaskard; Toftir, Faroes
- Capacity: 6,000
- Chairman: Ian Jacobsen
- Manager: Aleksandar Jovevic
- League: Faroe Islands Premier League
- 2025: Faroe Islands Premier League, 6th of 10
- Website: https://b68.fo/
Home colours	Away colours

B68 Toftir (Faroese: B68 Tofta Ítróttarfelag; also known as Tofta or just B68) is a Faroese football club based in the village of Toftir on the island of Eysturoy, playing in the Faroe Islands Premier League, the top tier of Faroese football.

Founded in 1962, B68 won the Faroese league championship three times (in 1984, 1985 and 1992) and host their matches at the Svangaskarð stadium in Toftir.

== History ==
After being promoted to the 1. deild (now called Effodeildin) in 1980, they won the league 3 times: in 1984, 1985, and 1992. In 2004 they were relegated. 2005 saw them bounce back to the top flight, coming first in the second division, but they were again relegated from the Premier Division at end of the 2006 season. In 2007, they easily won the second division, and were promoted.

In the 2008 season, they came 6th out of 10 in the Premier League. In the 2009 season, they finished in 4th place. In 2010, they finished as number 7 in the Effodeildin, and in 2011, they finished as number 6.

In 2012, B68 Toftir ended as number 9 in Effodeildin and were relegated: they only needed to score one more goal against TB Tvøroyri in the final round to stay up. They won the match 4–1, but it was not enough. They played in 1. deild in 2013.

== Achievements ==
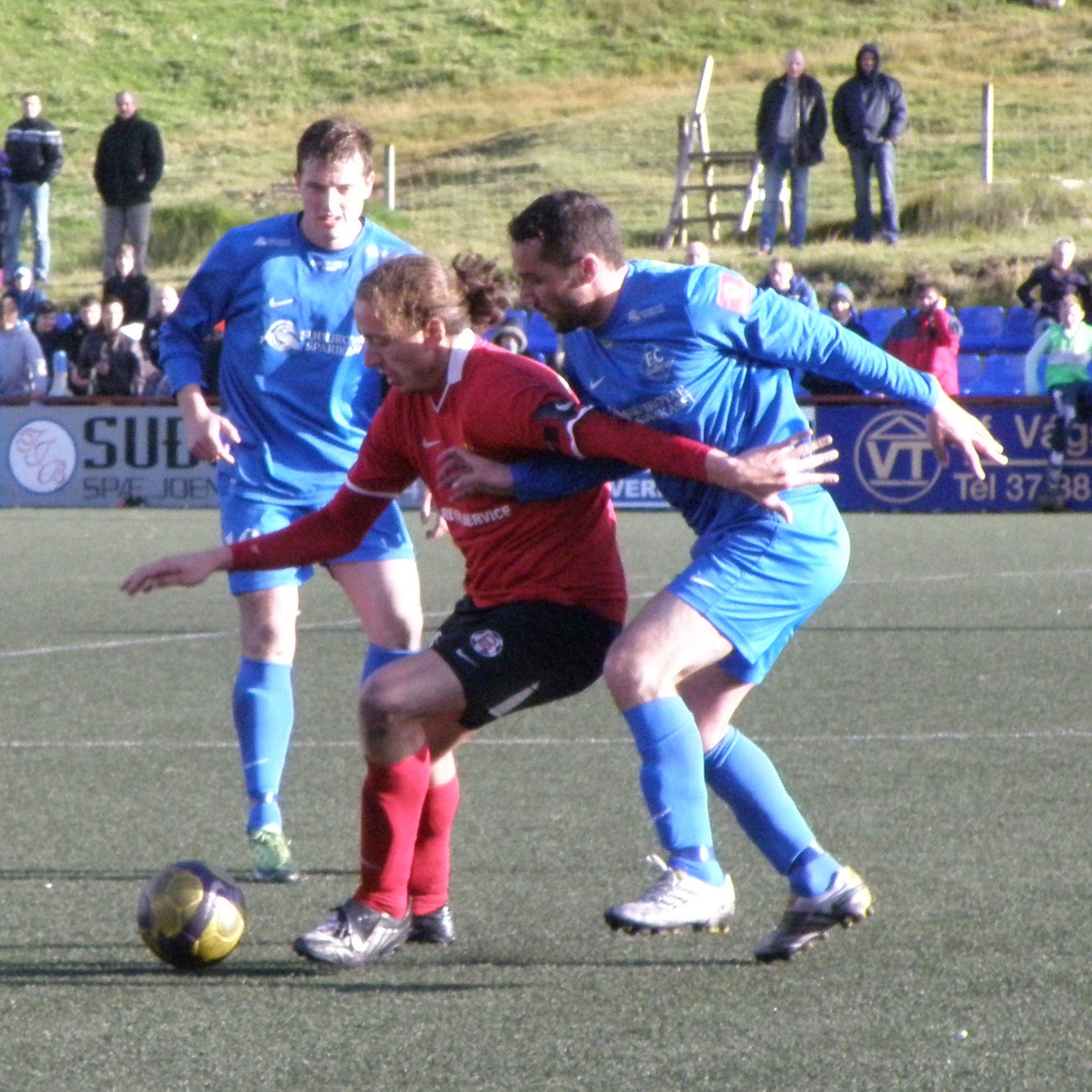
Jóhan Dávur Højgaard (in red) from B68 Toftir in a match in Vodafonedeildin in 2010 against FC Suðuroy.

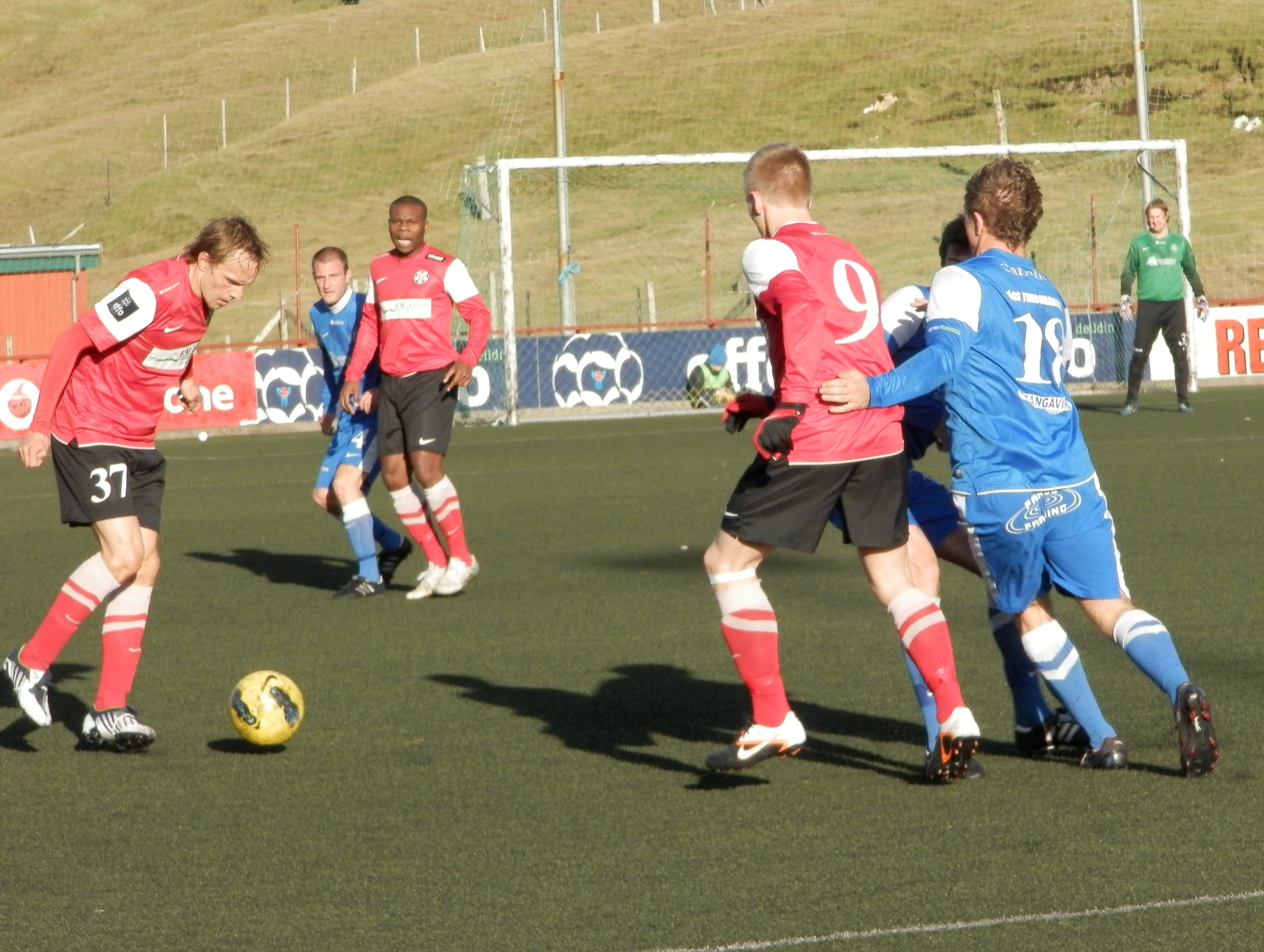
Christian Høgni Jacobsen and other B68 Toftir players against FC Suðuroy in September 2012.

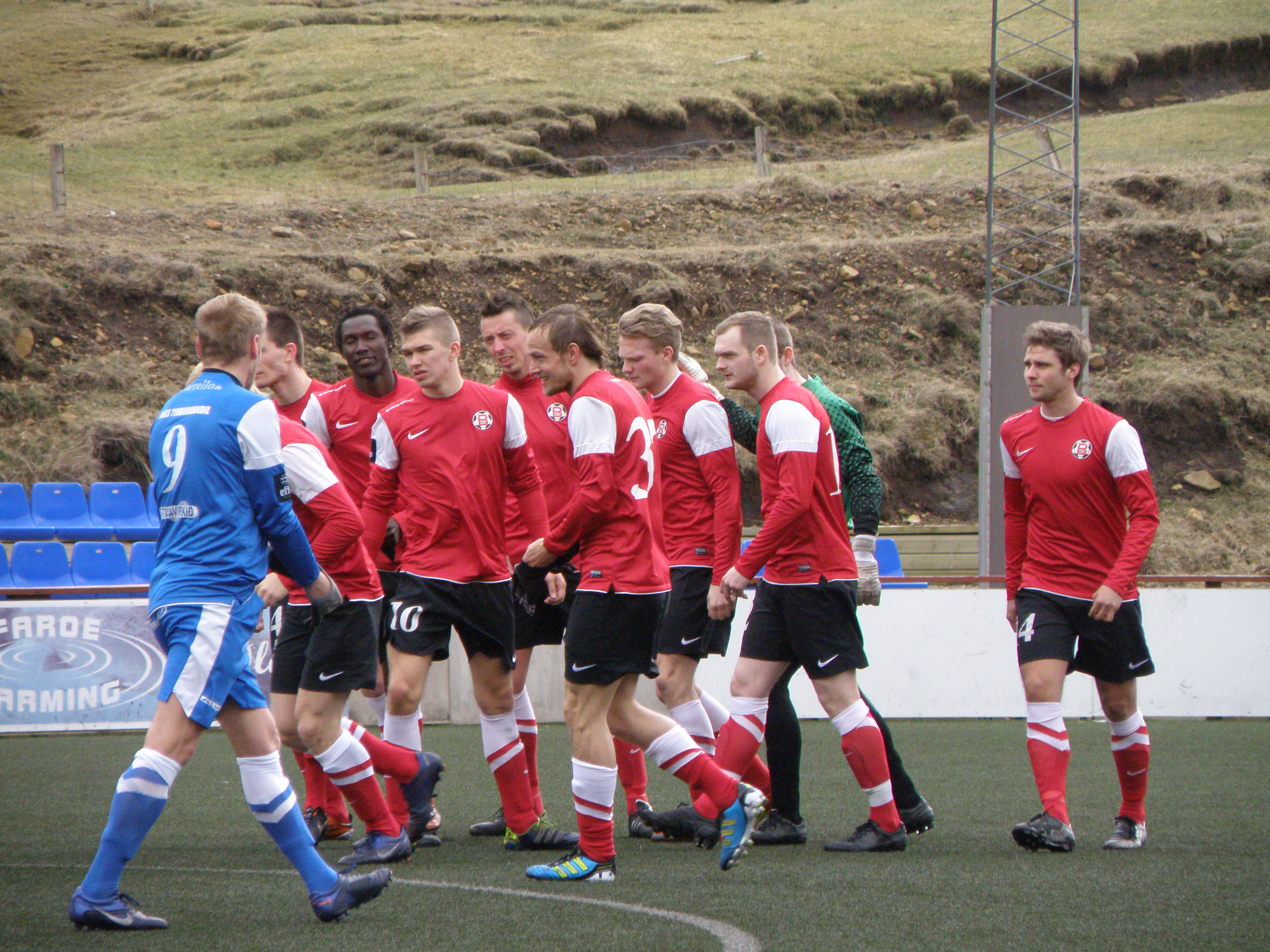
B68 Toftir players in 2012.

- Faroe Islands Premier League: 3
  - 1984, 1985, 1992
- 1. deild: 4
  - 1980, 2005, 2007, 2013
- FSF Trophy: 1
  - 2005

=== B68 Toftir in Europe ===
Season	Competition	Round		Opponent	Result
1993–94	Champions League	Q	(Croatia)	Croatia Zagreb	0–5, 0–6
1996	Intertoto Cup	1	(Austria)	LASK Linz	0–4
1996	Intertoto Cup	1	(Cyprus)	Apollon Limassol	1–4
1996	Intertoto Cup	1	(Germany)	Werder Bremen	0–2
1996	Intertoto Cup	1	(Sweden)	Djurgården	1–5
2001	Intertoto Cup	1	(Belgium)	Lokeren	2–4, 0–0
2002	Intertoto Cup	1	(Switzerland)	St. Gallen	1–5, 0–6
2004–05	UEFA Cup	1Q	(Latvia)	Ventspils	0–3, 0–8

=== UEFA club competition record ===
Competition	Matches	W	D	L	GF	GA
UEFA Champions League	2	0	0	2	0	11
UEFA Cup	2	0	0	2	0	11
UEFA Intertoto Cup	8	0	1	7	5	30

== Current squad ==
As of 15 August 2026

Note: Flags indicate national team as defined under FIFA eligibility rules; some limited exceptions apply. Players may hold more than one non-FIFA nationality.

No.	Pos.	Nation	Player
1	GK	FRO	Tórður Thomsen
2	DF	FRO	Torkil Holm
4	MF	FRO	Baldur Niclasen
5	DF	TOG	Ramzi Toure Idrissou
6	MF	DEN	Nicolai Dohn
7	MF	FRO	Djóni Samuelsen
8	FW	GAM	Mustafa Beyai
9	FW	FRA	Loïck Lespinasse
10	FW	DEN	Sebastian Lau
11	FW	FRO	Marjus Nón
12	GK	FRO	Karstin Hansen
13	MF	GHA	Patrick Mensah
14	MF	FRO	Karstin Clementsen

No.	Pos.	Nation	Player
16	FW	FRO	Frídi Petersen
17	MF	GHA	Latif Ahmed
18	DF	FRO	Ari Johannesen
19	FW	FRO	Hjarnar Johansen
21	MF	FRO	Eli Hansen
22	MF	FRO	Hanus Højgaard
25	DF	FRO	Aron Hansen
28	FW	FRO	Jónas Samuelsen
29	DF	FRO	Aleksandur Jensen
30	FW	SRB	Jovan Goronjić
77	GK	FRO	Svend Danielsen
-	MF	FRO	Teitur Knudsen
-	FW	SWE	Jonathan Okenge

== Staff ==
- Manager: (Faroe Islands) Jákup á Borg
- Ass. manager: (Faroe Islands) Jóhan Petur Poulsen
- Ass. manager: (Faroe Islands) Hans Erik Danielsen
- Caretaker: (Faroe Islands) Jógvan Hendrik Johannessen
- Caretaker: (Faroe Islands) Trúgvi Súnason í Hjøllum

== Former players ==
- (Senegal) Ibrahima Camara

== Chairmen ==
- Betuel Hansen (1962–?)
- Johan Hammer
- Dánjal Eli Højgaard
- Johan Hammer
- Dánjal Eli Højgaard
- Johan Hammer
- Marius Danielsen
- Jóannes á Líðarenda
- Janus Jensen (1978–79)
- Haldur Gaardbo (1979–82)
- Niclas Davidsen (1982–07)
- Jógvan Højgaard (2007–13)
- Beinta Mikkelsen (2013–14)
- Niclas Davidsen (2014–)

== Managers ==
- (Faroe Islands) Baldvin Baldvinsson (1978–79)
- (Denmark) Bent Løfquist (1980–81)
- (Faroe Islands) Sólbjørn Mortensen (1981–82)
- Valter Jensen (1983)
- John Kramer (1984–86)
- (Denmark) Svend Aage Strandholm (1987)
- John Kramer (1988–89)
- (Sweden) Kenneth Rosén (Jan 1990 – June 90)
- (Faroe Islands) Finnur Helmsdal (July 1990 – Dec 90)
- (Poland) Jan Kaczynski (1991)
- (Faroe Islands) Jógvan Nordbúð (1992–93)
- (Faroe Islands) Petur Mohr (1994–95)
- (Denmark) Christian Tranbjerg (Jan 1996 – July 96)
- (Faroe Islands) Jógvan Martin Olsen (Aug 1996 – Dec 96)
- (Serbia) Mihajlo Djuran (1997)
- (Faroe Islands) Petur Simonsen (1998)
- (Denmark) Bjørn Christensen (1999)
- (Faroe Islands) Jóannes Jakobsen (2000–01)
- (Denmark) Frank Skytte (Jan 2002 – Sept 02)
- (Faroe Islands) Ingolf Petersen (Sept 2002 – Dec 02)
- (Faroe Islands) Petur Mohr (2003–04)
- (Faroe Islands) Trygvi Mortensen (2004)
- (Faroe Islands) Julian Johnsson (2005)
- (Faroe Islands) Jóannes Jakobsen (Jan 2006 – July 2006)
- (Faroe Islands) Julian Johnsson (July 2006)
- (Faroe Islands) Bill McLeod Jacobsen (Aug 2006 – Dec 2006)
- (Faroe Islands) Rúni Nolsøe (2007)
- (Faroe Islands) Bill McLeod Jacobsen (Jan 2008 – Dec 11)
- (Faroe Islands) Pauli Poulsen (Jan 2012 – Sept 12)
- (Faroe Islands) Bill McLeod Jacobsen (Sept 2012 – Oct 12)
- (Faroe Islands) Øssur Hansen (Okt 2012 – Dec 13)
- (Faroe Islands) Jógvan Martin Olsen (Jan 2014 – Dec 14)
- (Faroe Islands) Súni Fríði Barbá (Jan 2015 – Oct 15)
- (Iceland) Páll Guðlaugsson (Oct 2015 – Jul 16)
- (Faroe Islands) Oddur Olsen (Jul 2016 – Dec 16)
- (Faroe Islands) Súni Olsen (Jan 2017 – Dec 17)
- (Faroe Islands) Bill McLeod Jacobsen (Jan 2018 – Dec 18)
- (Faroe Islands) Svenn Olsen (Jan 2019 – Jul 19)
- (Faroe Islands) Øssur Hansen (Aug 2019 – May 22)
- (Faroe Islands) Jákup á Borg (May 2022 – Sep 25)
- (Faroe Islands) Fródi Benjaminsen (Sep 2025 – Dec 25)
- (Serbia) Aleksandar Jovevic (Jan 2026 – present)

== See also ==
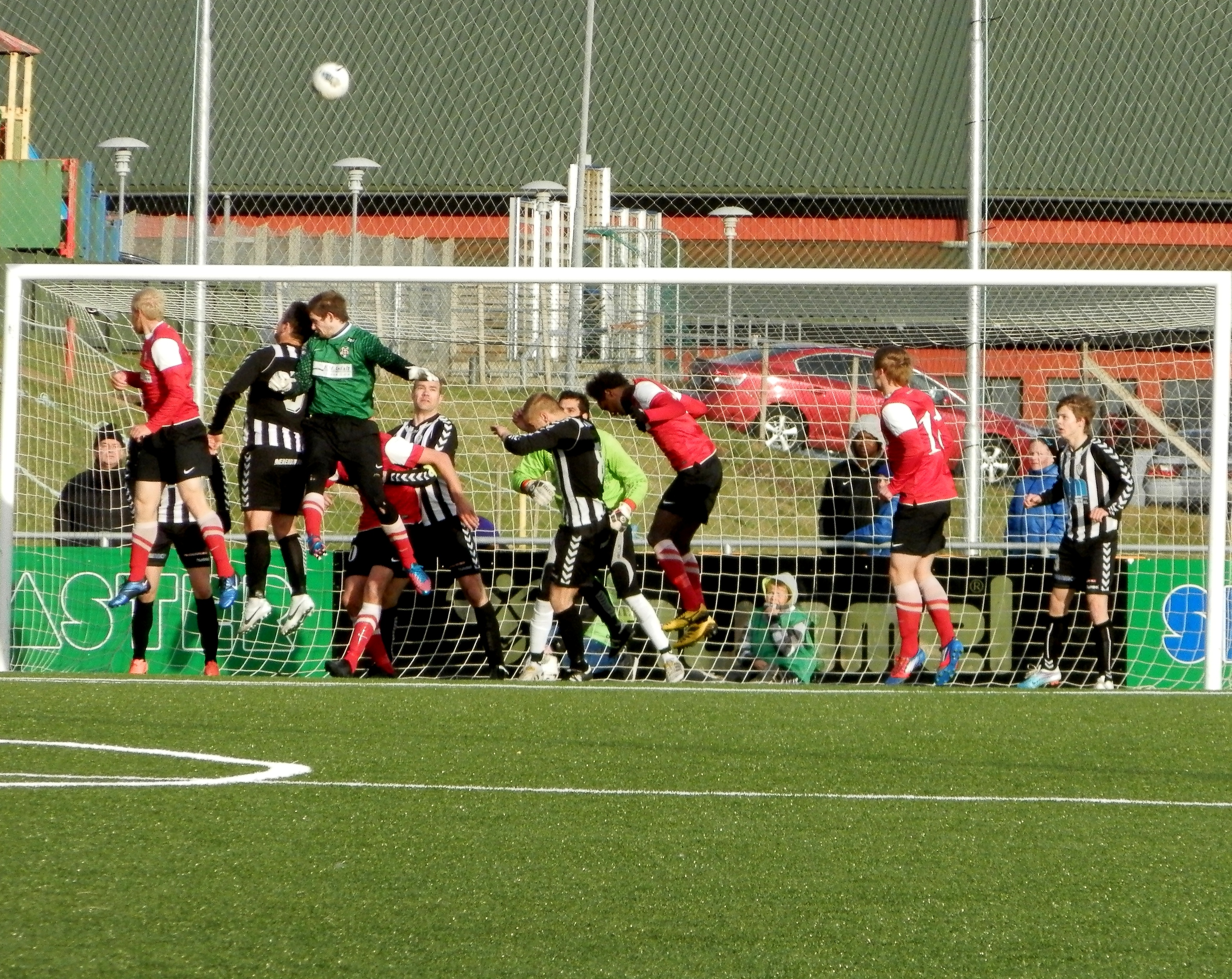
B68 vs. TB Tvøroyri in the final round of Effodeildin. Both teams struggled in order not to get relegated. B68 won the match 4–1, but it was not enough, the needed to win with 4 goals. This photo is from one of the final minutes, where even the goal keeper of B68 is trying to make a goal.

- B68 Toftir II
