= 2004 Faroe Islands Cup =

Tournament details
- Country: Faroe Islands
- Teams: 19

Final positions
- Champions: HB Tórshavn
- Runners-up: NSÍ Runavík

Tournament statistics
- Matches played: 52
- Goals scored: 195 (3.75 per match)
- Top goal scorer(s): Bartal Eliasen; Heine Fernandez (9 goals each)

The 2004 Faroe Islands Cup was played between 2 March and 29 July 2004. The cup was won by HB Tórshavn.

== Preliminary round ==
The match was played on 2 March 2004.

Team 1	Score	Team 2
SÍ Sørvágur	1–3	Fram

== First round ==
The matches were played on 6 and 7 March 2004.

Team 1	Score	Team 2
AB	4–0	B71
TB	2–1 (a.e.t.)	Royn Hvalba
FS	3–0	Fram
SÍ Sumba	3–2 (a.e.t.)	LÍF

== Second round ==
The matches were played on 14 and 15 March 2004.

Team 1	Score	Team 2
FS	2–1	SÍ Sumba
TB	2–1	AB

== Third round ==
The third round (group stage) was played between 20 March and 17 April 2004.

=== Group 1 ===
Pos	Team	Pld	W	D	L	GF	GA	GD	Pts	Qualification	B36	KÍ	NSÍ	FS
1	B36 Tórshavn	6	4	2	0	20	5	+15	14	Advanced to quarter-finals		1–1	4–2	9–0
2	KÍ Klaksvík	6	2	4	0	15	6	+9	10	Advanced to quarter-finals	1–1		2–2	7–0
3	NSÍ Runavík	6	2	2	2	15	12	+3	8	Advanced to quarter-finals	1–2	1–1		6–2
4	FS Vágar	6	0	0	6	4	31	−27	0		0–3	1–3	1–3	

=== Group 2 ===
Pos	Team	Pld	W	D	L	GF	GA	GD	Pts	Qualification	GÍ	ÍF	B68	TB
1	GÍ Gøta	6	6	0	0	12	1	+11	18	Advanced to quarter-finals		1–0	1–0	4–0
2	ÍF Fuglafjørður	6	4	0	2	19	8	+11	12	Advanced to quarter-finals	0–2		1–0	8–3
3	B68 Toftir	6	1	1	4	4	9	−5	4		0–1	2–5		1–0
4	TB Tvøroyri	6	0	1	5	5	22	−17	1		1–3	0–5	1–1	

=== Group 3 ===
Pos	Team	Pld	W	D	L	GF	GA	GD	Pts	Qualification	HB	VB	EBS	SKÁ
1	HB Tórshavn	6	5	0	1	15	8	+7	15	Advanced to quarter-finals		6–0	3–2	3–2
2	VB Vágur	6	4	0	2	18	11	+7	12	Advanced to quarter-finals	4–0		4–0	3–0
3	EB/Streymur	6	2	1	3	8	13	−5	7	Advanced to quarter-finals	0–2	2–1		2–1
4	Skála ÍF	6	0	1	5	8	17	−9	1		0–1	3–6	2–2	

== Quarter-finals ==
The matches were played on 8 and 9 May 2004.

Team 1	Score	Team 2
GÍ	0–1 (a.e.t.)	NSÍ
ÍF	2–1	KÍ
HB	7–1	EB/Streymur
B36	1–1 (a.e.t.); 3–4 (p)	VB

== Semi-finals ==
The first legs were played on 23 May and the second legs on 7 July 2004.

Team 1	Agg.	Team 2	1st leg	2nd leg
NSÍ	3–2	ÍF	0–0	3–2
VB	1–3	HB	1–1	0–2

== Final ==
29 July 2004

NSÍ	1–3	HB
Petersen 49'		Fernandez 22'; Jespersen 36'; Joensen 63'

Tórsvøllur, Tórshavn
Referee: Sune Johansen
