= Í Fløtugerði =

Football stadium in Fuglafjørður, Faroe Islands

Coordinates: 62.245018°N 6.814399°W

- Interactive map of Í Fløtugerði
- Location: Fuglafjørður, Faroe Islands
- Capacity: 1,200 (360 seats)
- Surface: Artificial turf
- Record attendance: over 1,500 (ÍF Fuglafjørður 3–1 TB Tvøroyri, 1979 1. deild)

Construction
- Opened: 1956
- Renovated: 2008

Tenant
- ÍF Fuglafjørður (1956–present)

Í Fløtugerði is a football stadium in Fuglafjørður, Faroe Islands. It is currently the home ground of ÍF Fuglafjørður.

Its capacity is 1,200, including 360 seats.

== History ==
On 15 November 1940, ÍF began purchasing land in northern part of Fuglafjørður. In the following years, the club obtained funding from the municipality and loans, which has resulted in official opening of the stadium in 1956.

On 12 August 1979, the record attendance was set. Over 1,500 people gathered around the stadium to watch the match between ÍF and TB Tvøroyri. The hosts won 3–1.

Í Fløtugerði has hosted the Faroe Islands Cup final on 29 September 1985. GÍ Gøta won 4–2 against NSÍ Runavík, thus winning its second cup trophy.

The stadium was renovated in 2008.
