= Heimari Dalur =

Valley in the Faroe Islands

Coordinates: 62.229°N 6.823°W

Heimari Dalur is a valley in the Faroe Islands, which lies between the town of Fuglafjørður and the village of Kambsdalur. It is surrounded by the firth in the east, Mount Kambur in the south, Breiðáskarð in the west and Gjógvaráfjall in the north.

== Faroe Island valleys ==
The valleys of Fuglafjørður can be divided into three categories:

The eastern valleys:

- Ytri Dalur (also called Kambsdalur)
- Heimari Dalur (sometimes called Breiðádalur)
- Innari Dalur (sometimes calles Jøkladalur)

The western valleys:

- Halgadalur
- Góðidalur

The northern valleys:

- Flatirnar
- Hjarðardalur
