= Løkin =

Løkin or Lokin is a surname. Notable people with the surname include:

- J. H. A. Lokin (born 1945), Dutch historian
- Abraham Løkin (born 1959), Faroese footballer
- Bogi Løkin (born 1988), Faroese footballer and poet
- Karl Løkin, Faroese footballer

== See also ==
- Við Løkin, stadium in Runavík, Faroe Islands
