= Innari Dalur =

Valley in Fuglafjarðar Municipality, Faroe Islands

Innari Dalur is the valley in the west of the town of Fuglafjørður in the Faroe Islands. It is surrounded by Fuglafjørður in the east, mount Gjógvaráfjall in the south, Jøklaskarð in the west and mount Blábjørg and mount Slætnatindur in the north.

The valleys of Fuglafjørður can be divided into three categories:

The eastern valleys:

- Ytri Dalur (also called Kambsdalur)
- Heimari Dalur (sometimes called Breiðádalur)
- Innari Dalur (sometimes called Jøkladalur)

The western valleys:

- Halgadalur
- Góðidalur

The northern valleys:

- Flatirnar
- Hjarðardalur

Sources: Heimsatlas. Føroya Skúalbókagrunnur, Tórshavn, 1993. Page 6–7.
