= 1985 1. deild =

Coordinates: 62.0889°N 6.7356°W

Faroe Islands Premier League Football
- Season: 1985
- Champions: B68
- Relegated: ÍF
- Matches played: 56
- Goals scored: 143 (2.55 per match)
- Top goalscorer: Símun Petur Justinussen (GÍ 10 goals))
- Biggest home win: GÍ 9–0 ÍF
- Biggest away win: GÍ 0–4 B68; GÍ 0–4 ÍF
- Highest scoring: GÍ 9–0 ÍF

Statistics of 1. deild in the 1985 season.

== Overview ==
It was contested by 8 teams, and B68 Toftir won the championship.

== League standings ==
Pos	Team	Pld	W	D	L	GF	GA	GD	Pts
1	B68 Toftir	14	8	5	1	19	7	+12	21
2	Havnar Bóltfelag	14	9	1	4	24	15	+9	19
3	KÍ Klaksvík	14	9	1	4	19	11	+8	19
4	Leirvík ÍF	14	5	4	5	21	18	+3	14
5	GÍ Gøta	14	5	3	6	27	21	+6	13
6	NSÍ Runavík	14	4	3	7	13	16	−3	11
7	TB Tvøroyri	14	3	4	7	11	20	−9	10
8	ÍF Fuglafjørður	14	2	1	11	9	35	−26	5

== Results ==
The schedule consisted of a total of 14 games. Each team played two games against every opponent in no particular order. One of the games was at home and one was away.

Home \ Away	B68	GÍG	HB	ÍF	KÍ	LÍF	NSÍ	TB
B68 Toftir		1–1	2–0	1–0	3–0	0–0	0–0	0–0
GÍ Gøta	0–4		4–1	9–0	1–4	1–2	1–3	4–0
HB	1–2	2–1		2–0	1–0	0–1	5–0	2–1
ÍF	0–4	1–2	1–4		0–1	3–1	0–1	2–0
KÍ	0–0	2–1	1–2	3–0		1–0	1–0	2–1
Leirvík ÍF	1–2	0–1	1–1	2–2	5–0		1–3	1–1
NSÍ Runavík	0–1	0–0	1–2	4–0	0–2	1–2		0–1
TB	4–1	1–1	0–1	1–0	0–3	2–4	0–0	

Source: www.faroesoccer.com
Legend: Blue = home team win; Yellow = draw; Red = away team win.

== Top goalscorers ==
Rank	Player	Club	Goals
1	(Faroe Islands) Símun Petur Justinussen	GÍ	10
2	(Faroe Islands) Aksel Højgaard	B68	5 (1)
2	(Faroe Islands) Erling Jacobsen	HB	6
2	(England) Martin Nugent	LÍF	6
5	(Faroe Islands) Eyðun Gaardbo	NSÍ	5
5	(Faroe Islands) Ingolf Petersen	B68	5
5	(Faroe Islands) Pauli Jarnskor	GÍ	5
8	(Faroe Islands) Hartvig Joensen	HB	4
8	(Faroe Islands) Kári Nielsen	HB	4
8	(Faroe Islands) Poul Enok Hansen	GÍ	4
