= 2002 Faroe Islands Cup =

Tournament details
- Country: Faroe Islands
- Teams: 18

Final positions
- Champions: NSÍ Runavík
- Runners-up: HB Tórshavn

Tournament statistics
- Matches played: 51
- Goals scored: 183 (3.59 per match)
- Top goal scorer: Andrew av Fløtum (9 goals)

The 2002 Faroe Islands Cup was played between 3 March and 29 July 2002. The cup was won by B36 Tórshavn.

== Preliminary round ==
The matches were played on 3, 9 and 10 March 2002.

Team 1	Score	Team 2
FS	8–0	Royn Hvalba
SÍ Sumba	2–1	Fram
B71	3–2	LÍF
ÍF	1–2	AB

== First round ==
The matches were played on 16 March 2002.

Team 1	Score	Team 2
FS	3–0	AB
SÍ Sumba	2–1	B71

== Second round ==
The second round (group stage) was played between 22 March and 21 April 2003.

=== Group 1 ===
Pos	Team	Pld	W	D	L	GF	GA	GD	Pts	Qualification	NSÍ	VB	B36	SÍ
1	NSÍ Runavík	6	4	1	1	8	5	+3	13	Advanced to quarter-finals		4–1	1–1	awd
2	VB Vágur	6	4	0	2	15	11	+4	12	Advanced to quarter-finals	2–1		3–1	4–2
3	B36 Tórshavn	6	3	1	2	18	7	+11	10	Advanced to quarter-finals	1–2	3–0		10–0
4	SÍ Sumba	6	0	0	6	3	21	−18	0		awd	0–5	1–2	

=== Group 2 ===
Pos	Team	Pld	W	D	L	GF	GA	GD	Pts	Qualification	GÍ	EBS	FS	TB
1	GÍ Gøta	6	3	3	0	11	5	+6	12	Advanced to quarter-finals		0–0	2–0	3–0
2	EB/Streymur	6	1	3	2	7	8	−1	6	Advanced to quarter-finals	1–2		2–1	2–2
3	FS Vágar	6	1	3	2	6	8	−2	6	Advanced to quarter-finals	1–1	1–1		2–1
4	TB Tvøroyri	6	1	3	2	9	12	−3	6		3–3	2–1	1–1	

=== Group 3 ===
Pos	Team	Pld	W	D	L	GF	GA	GD	Pts	Qualification	HB	B68	SKÁ	KÍ
1	HB Tórshavn	6	5	1	0	20	8	+12	16	Advanced to quarter-finals		3–1	6–2	2–2
2	B68 Toftir	6	3	0	3	14	12	+2	9	Advanced to quarter-finals	2–3		2–0	4–1
3	Skála ÍF	6	2	0	4	9	18	−9	6		0–3	1–4		4–2
4	KÍ Klaksvík	6	1	1	4	11	16	−5	4		1–3	4–1	1–2	

== Quarter-finals ==
The matches were played on 28 April and 1 and 12 May 2002.

Team 1	Score	Team 2
GÍ	1–2	B68
NSÍ	3–3 (a.e.t.); 3–1 (p)	FS
HB	3–0	B36
VB	2–0	EB/Streymur

== Semi-finals ==
The first legs were played on 12 May and 5 June and the second legs on 13 June 2002.

Team 1	Agg.	Team 2	1st leg	2nd leg
NSÍ	3–2	B68	0–0	3–2
VB	0–5	HB	0–2	0–3

== Final ==
29 July 2002

HB	1–2	NSÍ
Jacobsen 34'		Balling 48'; Nielsen 85' (pen.)

Tórsvøllur, Tórshavn
Attendance: 4,207
Referee: Birgir Sondum
