= 1976 1. deild =

Faroe Islands Premier League Football
- Season: 1976
- Champions: TB
- Relegated: NSÍ
- Matches played: 42
- Goals scored: 176 (4.19 per match)
- Biggest home win: KÍ 10–1 NSÍ
- Biggest away win: B36 1–6 VB; NSÍ 0–5 HB; VB 0–5 TB
- Highest scoring: KÍ 10–1 NSÍ; TB 6–5 KÍ

1. deild in the 1976 season was the 34th season of Faroese Premier League Football, and the first season in which it was referred to as 1. deild (First Division).

== Overview ==
It was contested by 7 teams, and TB Tvøroyri won the championship.

== League standings ==
Pos	Team	Pld	W	D	L	GF	GA	GD	Pts
1	TB Tvøroyri	12	9	2	1	39	15	+24	20
2	Havnar Bóltfelag	12	9	1	2	38	14	+24	19
3	KÍ Klaksvík	12	7	2	3	36	21	+15	16
4	VB Vágur	12	5	1	6	27	26	+1	11
5	B36 Tórshavn	12	3	3	6	15	25	−10	9
6	ÍF Fuglafjørður	12	3	3	6	15	28	−13	9
7	NSÍ Runavík	12	0	0	12	6	47	−41	0

== Results ==
The schedule consisted of a total of 12 games. Each team played two games against every opponent in no particular order. One of the games was at home and one was away.

=== Regular home games ===
Home \ Away	B36	HB	ÍF	KÍ	NSÍ	TB	VBV
B36 Tórshavn		0–3	1–1	3–0	5–0	1–1	1–6
HB	5–0		5–0	3–2	3–0	4–3	2–2
ÍF	1–1	0–2		1–3	3–1	1–3	3–2
KÍ	4–1	3–1	1–1		10–1	1–1	3–1
NSÍ Runavík	0–2	0–5	0–1	2–3		0–2	2–4
TB	1–0	4–2	5–1	6–5	4–0		4–0
VB Vágur	3–0	0–3	4–2	0–1	5–0	0–5	

Source: www.faroesoccer.com
Legend: Blue = home team win; Yellow = draw; Red = away team win.
