= Karl Løkin =

Faroese footballer (born 1991)

Personal information
- Full name: Karl Abrahamsson Løkin
- Date of birth: 19 April 1991 (age 35)
- Place of birth: Fuglafjørður, Faroe Islands
- Height: 1.77 m (5 ft 10 in)
- Position: Midfielder

Team information
- Current team: ÍF Fuglafjørður
- Number: 6

Senior career*
Years	Team	Apps	(Gls)
2010–2012	ÍF Fuglafjørður	70	(3)
2013	NSÍ Runavík	8	(0)
2013	Víkingur Ólafsvík	0	(0)
2013	NSÍ Runavík	12	(0)
2014	ÍF Fuglafjørður	15	(3)
2014–2015	Næstved	5	(0)
2015–2016	ÍF Fuglafjørður	46	(4)
2017–2018	NSÍ Runavík	39	(0)
2018–2019	Víkingur Gøta	10	(0)
2019–	ÍF Fuglafjørður	134	(7)

International career
	Faroe Islands U21	8	(0)
2013–	Faroe Islands	5	(0)
- * Club domestic league appearances and goals as of 30 May 2024

Karl Abrahamsson Løkin (born 19 April 1991) is a Faroese international footballer who plays for Faroese club ÍF Fuglafjørður as a midfielder.

== Career ==
Løkin started his career at ÍF Fuglafjørður before joining NSÍ Runavík. He then spent a short time in Iceland with Víkingur Ó. Løkin then rejoined NSÍ Runavík, before rejoining ÍF Fuglafjørður on 1 January 2014.

In August 2014, Løkin joined Danish club Næstved Boldklub on a deal until the end of 2016. However, his contract was terminated by mutual consent on 27 February 2015. He played five games for Næstved, two of them from the first minute.

Løkin has played four times for the senior Faroe Islands national football team and eight times at under-21 level.

== Personal life ==
He is the younger brother of fellow Faroese International footballer Bogi Løkin, and both are sons of former Faroese international midfielder Abraham Løkin.
