= András Gángó =

Hungarian footballer (born 1984)

Personal information
- Date of birth: March 2, 1984 (age 42)
- Place of birth: Hungary
- Position: Goalkeeper

Team information
- Current team: AGF (gk coach)

Youth career
- AGF
- Aarhus Fremad

Senior career*
Years	Team	Apps	(Gls)
2007–2010	ÍF		
2010–2011	NSÍ	54	(0)
2012	KÍ	27	(0)
2013	07 Vestur	27	(0)
2014–2015	NSÍ	54	(0)
2016–2017	Skála	54	(0)
2018	NSÍ	0	(0)

Managerial career
- –2019: Faroe Islands U-21 (gk coach)
- 2019–2021: Tromsø (gk coach)
- 2020–2023: Faroe Islands (gk coach)
- 2021–2024: Vejle (gk coach)
- 2024–: AGF (gk coach)
- * Club domestic league appearances and goals

András Gángó (born 2 March 1984) is a Hungarian former footballer who played as a goalkeeper and current goalkeeper coach of AGF.

== Early life ==
He was born in 1984 in Mór, Hungary. He was childhood friends with Hungary international Tamás Priskin.

== Career ==
For András, it will also be a reunion with Aarhus, where he came from Hungary twenty years ago and was a student at Idrætshøjskolen in Vejlby/Risskov.

Gángó came from Hungary to Denmark, where he settled in Aarhus and was a student at Idrætshøjskolen in Vejlby/Risskov. In that connection, he trained briefly with Danish club AGF and also trained at Aarhus Fremad before his active career took off abroad.

In 2007, he signed for Faroese side ÍF. In 2010, he signed for Faroese side NSÍ. In 2012, he signed for Faroese side KÍ. In 2013, he signed for Faroese side 07 Vestur. In 2014, he returned to Faroese side NSÍ. In 2016, he signed for Faroese side Skála. In 2018, he returned to Faroese side NSÍ. He has been described as "performed excellently in the Champions League and Europa League qualifiers on several occasions, and was chosen as one of the best in the Faroese league year after year".

== Personal life ==
He can speak fluent Faroese. He has applied to become a naturalized Faroese citizen. He has worked as a gardener and as a store manager. He has three children.

== Coaching career ==
Gángó worked as goalkeeping coach for the Faroe Islands U-21 national team for a year, also during his active player career. He also took the coaching courses and obtained the UEFA B and UEFA GK-A licenses.

In March 2019, Gángó was hired as goalkeeper coach for Tromsø IL, who played in the Norwegian top league, Eliteserien, on a contract until the summer. In July 2019, Gángó had his contract further extended. Alongside this, in 2020 he also became goalkeeping coach for the Faroe Islands national team. Gángó left Tromsø in the summer of 2021 and in March 2023 he left his job as goalkeeping coach of the national team.

In the summer of 2021, Gángó was presented as the new goalkeeping coach for the Danish club Vejle Boldklub. Prior to the 2024–25 season, Gángó was hired as goalkeeper coach for another Danish club, AGF.
