= 1979 1. deild =

Coordinates: 62.0167°N 6.7667°W

Faroe Islands Premier League Football
- Season: 1979
- Champions: ÍF
- Relegated: NSÍ
- Matches played: 56
- Goals scored: 208 (3.71 per match)
- Biggest home win: TB 8–1 KÍ
- Biggest away win: KÍ 0–5 ÍF; NSÍ 0–5 TB; VB 1–6 HB
- Highest scoring: TB 8–1 KÍ

Statistics of 1. deild in the 1979 season.

== Overview ==
It was contested by 8 teams, and ÍF Fuglafjørður won the championship.

== League standings ==
Pos	Team	Pld	W	D	L	GF	GA	GD	Pts
1	ÍF Fuglafjørður	14	11	3	0	34	9	+25	25
2	TB Tvøroyri	14	11	2	1	44	18	+26	24
3	Havnar Bóltfelag	14	8	2	4	39	20	+19	18
4	B36 Tórshavn	14	4	4	6	21	30	−9	12
5	MB Miðvágur	14	3	5	6	22	27	−5	11
6	KÍ Klaksvík	14	3	4	7	18	36	−18	10
7	VB Vágur	14	1	6	7	18	33	−15	8
8	NSÍ Runavík	14	0	4	10	12	35	−23	4

== Results ==
The schedule consisted of a total of 14 games. Each team played two games against every opponent in no particular order. One of the games was at home and one was away.

Home \ Away	B36	HB	ÍF	KÍ	MBM	NSÍ	TB	VBV
B36 Tórshavn		1–1	0–0	3–1	2–2	3–0	3–4	2–2
HB	3–1		2–4	3–1	5–0	5–1	1–2	4–1
ÍF	3–1	3–2		4–0	2–0	3–1	3–1	1–1
KÍ	1–3	1–3	0–5		2–0	1–0	1–1	2–0
MB Miðvágur	1–2	1–3	0–2	1–1		2–2	3–5	6–0
NSÍ Runavík	0–1	0–0	0–2	2–5	1–2		0–5	1–1
TB	5–0	1–2	1–1	8–1	2–0	3–2		2–1
VB Vágur	4–0	1–6	0–1	3–3	1–1	2–2	1–4	

Source: www.faroesoccer.com
Legend: Blue = home team win; Yellow = draw; Red = away team win.
