= Bogi Løkin =

Faroese footballer (born 1988)

Personal information
- Full name: Bogi Abrahamson Løkin
- Date of birth: 22 October 1988 (age 38)
- Place of birth: Runavík, Faroe Islands
- Height: 1.81 m (5 ft 11 in)

Team information
- Current team: ÍF Fuglafjørður

Senior career*
Years	Team	Apps	(Gls)
2005–2009	NSÍ Runavík	112	(25)
2010	BK Frem	10	(0)
2010	NSÍ Runavík	11	(1)
2011–2012	ÍF Fuglafjørður	37	(4)
2014	ÍF Fuglafjørður	10	(2)
2017–2019	NSÍ Runavík	7	(0)
2021–2022	NSÍ Runavík II	4	(0)
2021–	NSÍ Runavík III	14	(5)

International career^{‡}
2008–2012	Faroe Islands	18	(1)
- * Club domestic league appearances and goals as of 14:04, 14 October 2022 (UTC) ‡ National team caps and goals as of 17:23, 9 May 2020 (UTC)

Bogi Løkin (born 22 October 1988) is a Faroese footballer and former poet who plays for Faroese club ÍF Fuglafjørður.

Bogi Løkin is the son of former Faroese international midfielder Abraham Løkin, who is the former coach of ÍF Fuglafjørður. His younger brothers, Karl Løkin and Steffan Løkin, are also footballers.

== Club career ==
Bogi Løkin began his career at NSÍ Runavík and made over 100 appearances for the club before he turned 21. In 2010, he joined BK Frem midway through the Danish season. At the end of the season he chose to go back to the Faroe Islands for summer 2010, joining his former club NSÍ Runavík. In 2011, he joined ÍF Fuglafjørður. He left the club again at the end of 2012.

After leaving ÍF Fuglafjørður, Løkin moved abroad. He returned to ÍF Fuglafjørður in July 2014. In 2020 he made a return to ÍF Fuglafjørður, where he had a warm welcome from the ÍF ultras, as a tifo was prepared in his honor. Løkin is seen by many to be the greatest footballer to play for ÍF

== International career ==
He played for the Faroe Islands national team and he has scored one goal. He scored an international goal for the Faroe Islands on 11 October 2008 in their 1–1 draw against Austria in a qualifying match for the 2010 FIFA World Cup.

== International goals ==
Scores and results list Faroe Islands' goal tally first.

#	Date	Venue	Opponent	Score	Result	Competition
1	11 October 2008	Tórsvøllur, Tórshavn, Faroe Islands	Austria	1–0	1–1	2010 FIFA World Cup Qualifying
