= Høgni Zachariasen =

Faroese footballer

Personal information
- Date of birth: 26 August 1982 (age 44)
- Place of birth: Fuglafjørður, Faroe Islands
- Position: Midfielder

Team information
- Current team: ÍF Fuglafjørður

Senior career*
| Years | Team | Apps | (Gls) |
| 2001–2007 | ÍF Fuglafjørður | 131 | (32) |
| 2008 | EB/Streymur | 12 | (4) |
| 2009– | ÍF Fuglafjørður | 44 | (3) |

International career
| 2010– | Faroe Islands | 1 | (0) |
- * Club domestic league appearances and goals

Høgni Zachariasen (born 26 August 1982) is a Faroese international footballer who plays club football for ÍF Fuglafjørður, as a midfielder.

He made his international debut for the Faroe Islands national football team in 2010.
