= Helen Nkwocha =

English football manager

Personal information
- Full name: Helen Lorraine Nkwocha
- Date of birth: 24 August 1976 (age 50)
- Place of birth: London, England

Team information
- Current team: Tvøroyrar Bóltfelag (manager)

Senior career*
Years	Team	Apps	(Gls)
- Millwall Lionesses
- Wimbledon
- Crystal Palace
- Fulham
- Tooting & Mitcham

Managerial career
- 2021–: Tvøroyrar Bóltfelag (men)
- * Club domestic league appearances and goals

Helen Lorraine Nkwocha (born 24 August 1976) is an English football manager and former footballer who is currently manager of Faroe Islands Premier League club Tvøroyrar Bóltfelag. In August 2021, Nkwocha gained international attention for being the first woman to manage a top-flight European men's football team.

== Personal life ==
Nkwocha was born and raised in South London by her mother, Justina. She was the youngest of five siblings. Since the age of 14, Nkwocha had aspired to be a police officer. She joined the Metropolitan Police at 20 after graduating from the University of North London with a literature degree. She spent a total of 15 years with the police. Since January 2021, Nkwocha has lived in the village of Tvøroyri.

== Playing career ==
During her 23 year playing career, Nkwocha played for a number of clubs including Millwall Lionesses, Wimbledon, Crystal Palace, Fulham and Tooting & Mitcham. An anterior cruciate ligament injury was what led her to retire in her early thirties.

== Managerial career ==
In order to fulfill her wish to become a professional football manager, Nkwocha sold her home and decided to live on a houseboat instead. When she was appointed manager of Faroese club Tvøroyrar Bóltfelag, she became the first female manager to lead a top-flight European male team in football. She was initially hired to run the youth team in January 2021 but was promoted to the head coach of the senior team in September of that year. Her first match in charge was a 1–6 loss to Havnar Bóltfelag.
