= Kryger =

Kryger is a surname. Notable people with the surname include:

- Agata Kryger (born 1997), Polish former competitive figure skater
- Axel Kryger (born 1997), Norwegian footballer
- Lasse Kryger (born 1982), Danish former professional footballer
- Marius Kryger Lindh (born 1999), Danish professional footballer
- Waldemar Kryger (born 1968), Polish former professional footballer
