= 1980 1. deild =

Coordinates: 62.0167°N 6.7667°W

Faroe Islands Premier League Football
- Season: 1980
- Champions: TB
- Relegated: MB
- Matches played: 56
- Goals scored: 180 (3.21 per match)
- Biggest home win: HB 7–1 GÍ; TB 7–1 B36
- Biggest away win: VB 1–7 TB
- Highest scoring: HB 7–1 GÍ; TB 7–1 B36; VB 1–7 TB

Statistics of 1. deild in the 1980 season.

== Overview ==
It was contested by 8 teams, and TB Tvøroyri won the championship.

== League standings ==
Pos	Team	Pld	W	D	L	GF	GA	GD	Pts
1	TB Tvøroyri	14	12	1	1	52	10	+42	25
2	Havnar Bóltfelag	14	9	2	3	31	19	+12	20
3	KÍ Klaksvík	15	7	4	4	18	16	+2	18
4	GÍ Gøta	14	7	3	4	26	26	0	17
5	ÍF Fuglafjørður	14	5	3	6	18	19	−1	13
6	VB Vágur	14	3	3	8	13	20	−7	9
7	B36 Tórshavn	14	2	2	10	12	26	−14	6
8	MB Miðvágur	14	2	1	11	10	44	−34	5

== Results ==
The schedule consisted of a total of 14 games. Each team played two games against every opponent in no particular order. One of the games was at home and one was away.

Home \ Away	B36	GÍG	HB	ÍF	KÍ	MBM	TB	VBV
B36 Tórshavn		2–4	2–3	0–1	1–1	2–0	0–1	1–0
GÍ Gøta	2–2		1–1	0–3	2–1	5–1	0–3	4–1
HB	1–0	7–1		3–1	1–3	5–0	0–5	4–0
ÍF	1–0	1–1	1–3		0–1	3–0	2–2	1–1
KÍ	2–1	0–1	0–2	0–5		1–1	3–2	5–1
MB Miðvágur	2–0	0–4	0–3	1–2	0–1		1–5	1–2
TB	7–1	3–0	5–1	4–1	4–0	1–0		2–0
VB Vágur	2–0	0–1	0–0	1–0	0–0	2–3	1–7	

Source: www.faroesoccer.com
Legend: Blue = home team win; Yellow = draw; Red = away team win.
