= Barbara í Gongini =

Faroese-Danish avant-garde fashion designer

- Born: 12 June 1966 (age 60); Fuglafjørður, Faroe Islands
- Education: Danish School of Design, Institute of Unica Design
- Labels: BARBARA I GONGINI; The Black Line; norðan by BARBARA I GONGINI
- Awards: Faroese Cultural Prize, 2018

Barbara í Gongini (born 12 June 1966) is a Faroese-Danish avant-garde fashion designer from Fuglafjørður, Faroe Islands.

== Early life and education ==
Barbara í Gongini is a Faroese avant-garde fashion designer who was born in Fuglafjørður and grew up in the old part of Tórshavn, the capital city of the Faroe Islands. As a child, she always had an inclination for the arts and design, which led her to study painting, art and textile construction, graduating in 1990.

Gongini completed her design education at Denmark's School of Design, at the Institute of Unica Design, in 1996.

Growing up with the values of the Faroe Islands, a small community that places focus on using the most of raw natural resources, influenced Gongini's approach to fashion, inspiring her to create designs that are rich in multi-functional elements, so that they can be reused and transformed.

== Fashion design career ==
Gongini's first clothing collection was made from fabric residue and launched in 2000, when she was still part of the Könrøg movement. Könrøg was an artist collective formed by 10 Danish artists between 2001 and 2006, in response to the Antwerp Six designer collective that existed in the '80s.

In the early 2000s, she was also part of the team behind the Könrøg clothing store in Copenhagen, which at the time was known as the capital's most hip shop with Danish designer clothes and Alternative fashion, for those who dared to stand out. Gongini stopped working for Könrøg in 2004 in order to focus on her design career, while the store closed down two year later, in 2006.

In 2005, Gongini established her namesake label, with the brand name stylised as BARBARA I GONGINI. In the early days, the BARBARA I GONGINI collections were created for both men and women, focusing on androgyny and multifunctionality. The menswear line only became separate starting with the Autumn/Winter 2013 collection, which was presented at the Copenhagen Fashion Week.

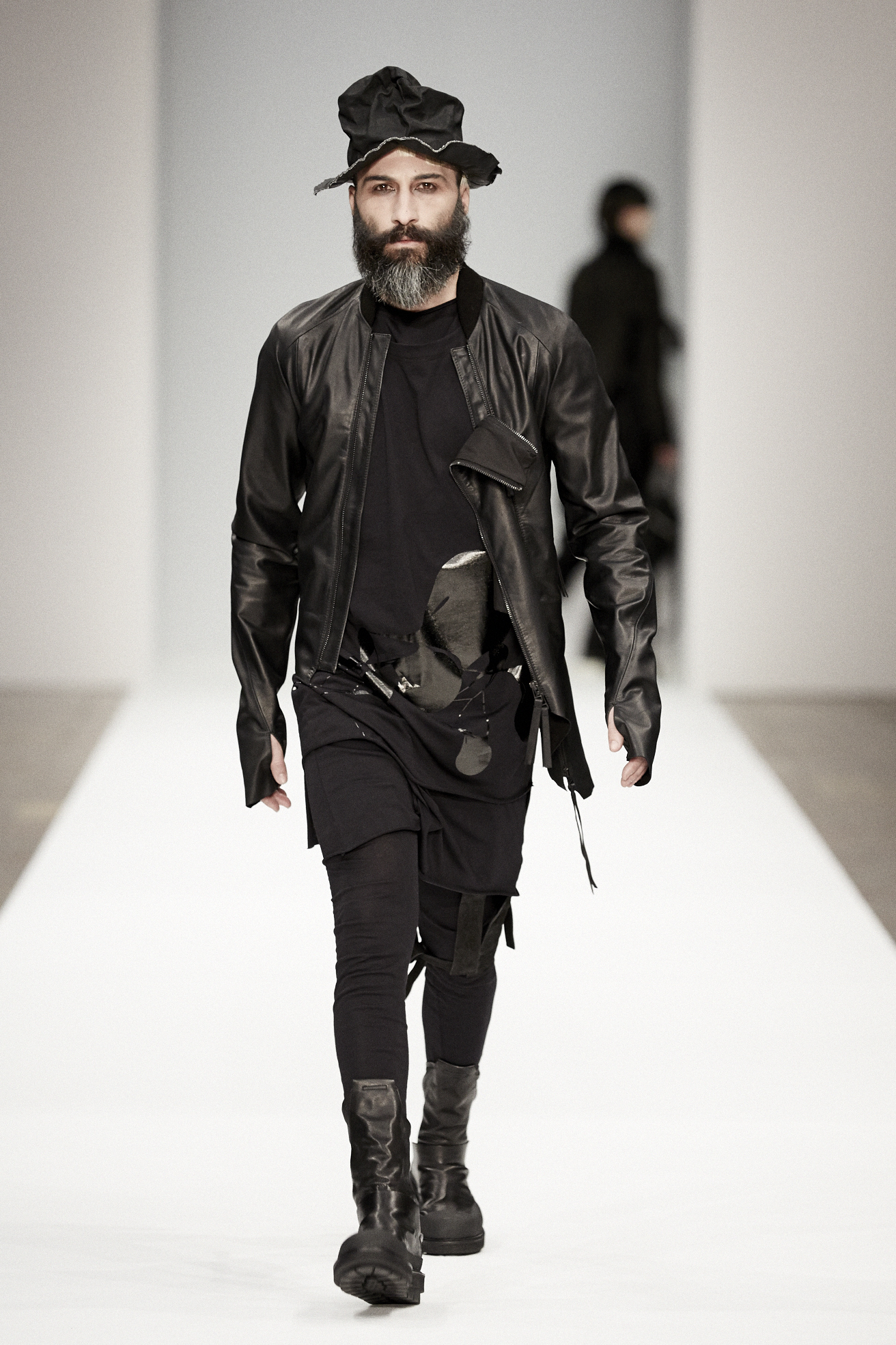
BARBARA I GONGINI AW2016 Men's Collection

In her fashion designs, she makes extensive use of draping and layering techniques, often creating asymmetrical garments that can be worn in multiple ways. Juxtaposition and deconstruction play a central part, with Gongini predominantly using black and non-colors 'to allow fabrics and textures to speak as color instead'. She combines a variety of natural and recycled textiles, sometimes mixing several types of materials, such as wool, leather, cotton and plastic, in a single garment. Gongini's leather garments are often treated to give a dramatic texture that is reminiscent of the Faroese landscape. Her designs are available at the BARBARA I GONGINI headquarters showroom in Copenhagen and in specialized avant-garde clothing stores worldwide. Gongini's avant-garde design philosophy means that the collections are not trend-based, but focus on 'nurturing a longevity formula'. She often compares her collections to new chapters to turn to in a story, describing them as 'numerical'. As a proponent of the zero-waste wardrobe, she seeks to lengthen the life-cycle of garments through innovative designs called 'multiways'.

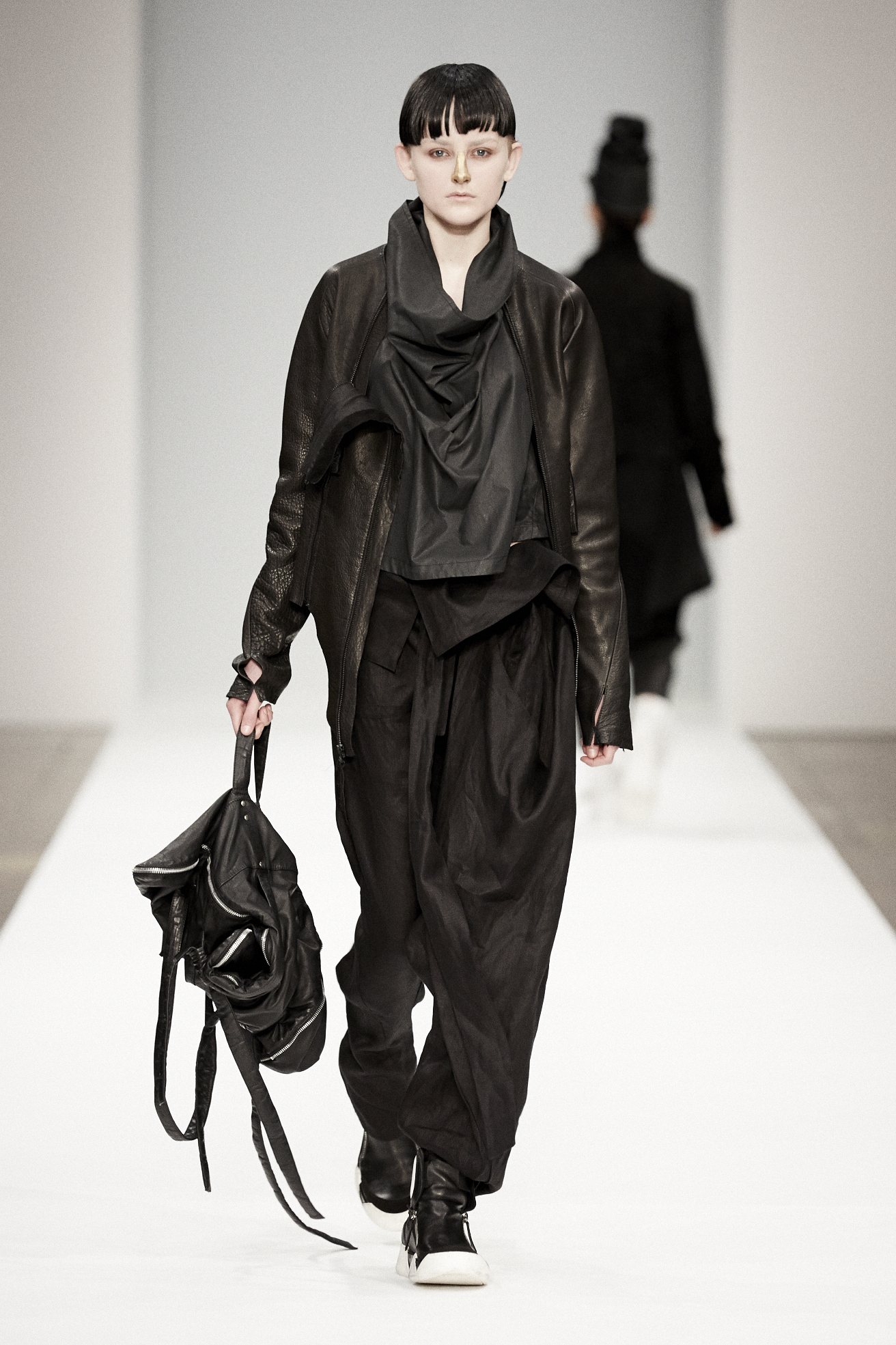
BARBARA I GONGINI AW2016 Women's Collection

Although her fashion collections integrate sustainability principles and she has been said to be 'ahead of her time when it comes to sustainability', Gongini is known for making exceptions 'if a few materials do not quite meet the standards', in order not to compromise on design. Nominated for the Danish Fashion Award Committee's Ethical Award in 2010, she was also selected to represent Denmark at the Nordic Eco Fashion and Product Design Exhibition in Berlin.

Her runway collections were first shown at the Paris Fashion Week in 2017. At this time, she also presented the film MODULE MODULAR, a video collaboration with director and photographer Mikkel Völcker.

In 2018, Barbara í Gongini was awarded the Faroese Cultural Prize, the highest distinction that a person of culture can receive in the Faroe Islands.

== Artistic collaborations ==
During her career, Gongini has been an active participant in the Nordic art discourse, joining interdisciplinary collaborations showcased around the world. Notable examples include "The Weather Diaries", an exhibition which was part of the third Nordic Fashion Biennale, shown at the Museum Angewandte Kunst in Frankfurt and the Nordic Heritage Museum in Seattle, Washington, and "Outer Dark", a collaboration that saw her work exhibited next to household avant-garde fashion names such as Yohji Yamamoto, Martin Margiela and Alexander McQueen.

== In popular culture ==
Barbara I Gongini's designs have been spotted on celebrities such as Florence Welch of Florence and the Machine, in her 2012 music video for Never Let Me Go, as well as on Lenny Kravitz, Rihanna and Chelsea Wolfe
