= 1977 1. deild =

Coordinates: 62.0167°N 6.7667°W

Faroe Islands Premier League Football
- Season: 1977
- Champions: TB
- Relegated: Fram
- Matches played: 42
- Goals scored: 135 (3.21 per match)
- Biggest home win: ÍF 7–1 Fram
- Biggest away win: B36 0–4 HB; Fram 0–4 HB; Fram 0–4 TB
- Highest scoring: ÍF 7–1 Fram

Statistics of 1. deild in the 1977 season.

== Overview ==
It was contested by 7 teams, and TB Tvøroyri won the championship.

== League standings ==
Pos	Team	Pld	W	D	L	GF	GA	GD	Pts
1	TB Tvøroyri	12	9	2	1	33	7	+26	20
2	Havnar Bóltfelag	12	7	2	3	23	9	+14	16
3	VB Vágur	12	7	1	4	22	19	+3	15
4	ÍF Fuglafjørður	12	6	1	5	26	16	+10	13
5	KÍ Klaksvík	12	3	2	7	13	23	−10	8
6	B36 Tórshavn	12	2	4	6	12	28	−16	8
7	Fram Tórshavn	12	1	2	9	6	33	−27	4

== Results ==
The schedule consisted of a total of 12 games. Each team played two games against every opponent in no particular order. One of the games was at home and one was away.

=== Regular home games ===
Home \ Away	B36	Fram	HB	ÍF	KÍ	TB	VBV
B36 Tórshavn		0–0	0–4	2–0	3–0	2–2	1–1
Fram Tórshavn	3–1		0–3	0–4	0–3	0–4	1–2
HB	5–0	1–1		2–1	3–0	0–3	1–3
ÍF	5–1	7–1	0–0		4–1	2–1	3–2
KÍ	1–1	2–0	3–1	0–1		0–0	4–3
TB	5–1	3–0	1–0	5–1	5–0		6–1
VB Vágur	1–0	3–0	0–3	2–0	2–1	0–1	

Source: www.faroesoccer.com
Legend: Blue = home team win; Yellow = draw; Red = away team win.
