= Helgi Petersen =

Faroese footballer (born 1978)

Personal information
- Full name: Helgi Lamhauge Petersen
- Date of birth: 5 April 1978 (age 48)
- Place of birth: Runavik, Faroe Islands
- Height: 1.76 m (5 ft 9 in)
- Position: Midfielder

Senior career*
Years	Team	Apps	(Gls)
1996–1999	NSÍ Runavík		
2000–2001	GÍ Gøta		
2002–2006	NSÍ Runavík		
2007	ÍF Fuglafjørður		
2008	Fram Tórshavn		
2008	ÍF Fuglafjørður		
2009	FC Hoyvík		
2011–2012	NSÍ Runavík		

International career
2001–2003	Faroe Islands	6	(0)

Managerial career
- 2009: FC Hoyvík (player-manager)
- 2014: NSÍ Runavík
- * Club domestic league appearances and goals

Helgi Petersen (born 5 April 1978) is a Faroese retired football midfielder. He became Faroese league top goalscorer in 2001.
