= 1987 1. deild =

Coordinates: 62.0889°N 6.7356°W

Faroe Islands Premier League Football
- Season: 1987
- Champions: TB
- Relegated: VB
- Matches played: 56
- Goals scored: 178 (3.18 per match)
- Biggest home win: HB 8–0 VB
- Biggest away win: KÍ 0–3 TB; LÍF 1–4 HB; VB 0–3 TB Tvøroyri
- Highest scoring: HB 6–2 KÍ; HB 8–0 VB

Statistics of 1. deild in the 1987 season.

== Overview ==
It was contested by 8 teams, and TB Tvøroyri won the championship.

== League standings ==
Pos	Team	Pld	W	D	L	GF	GA	GD	Pts
1	TB Tvøroyri	14	7	4	3	26	16	+10	18
2	Havnar Bóltfelag	14	6	5	3	34	17	+17	17
3	GÍ Gøta	14	6	5	3	32	20	+12	17
4	NSÍ Runavík	14	6	4	4	22	20	+2	16
5	KÍ Klaksvík	14	2	8	4	19	26	−7	12
6	B68 Toftir	14	3	6	5	14	22	−8	12
7	Leirvík ÍF	14	3	4	7	21	30	−9	10
8	VB Vágur	14	1	8	5	10	27	−17	10

== Results ==
The schedule consisted of a total of 14 games. Each team played two games against every opponent in no particular order. One of the games was at home and one was away.

Home \ Away	B68	GÍG	HB	KÍ	LÍF	NSÍ	TB	VBV
B68 Toftir		2–2	1–0	0–2	4–1	0–1	1–0	0–0
GÍ Gøta	2–2		4–1	1–0	3–2	4–1	4–0	1–2
HB	1–1	1–1		6–2	3–0	2–3	1–1	8–0
KÍ	1–1	3–0	1–1		1–1	2–2	0–3	3–0
Leirvík ÍF	2–0	2–2	1–4	2–2		1–3	2–3	2–0
NSÍ Runavík	3–0	3–1	0–2	2–2	1–2		2–0	1–1
TB	5–0	2–1	2–2	0–0	4–3	3–0		0–0
VB Vágur	2–2	2–2	0–2	3–3	0–0	0–0	0–3	

Source: www.faroesoccer.com
Legend: Blue = home team win; Yellow = draw; Red = away team win.
