= Ytri Dalur =

Valley in the Faroe Islands

Ytri Dalur is the southernmost of the valleys of Fuglafjørður on the island of Eysturoy in the Faroes. Ytri Dalur is also referred to as Kambsdalur.

The valleys of Fuglafjørður can be divided into three categories: The eastern valleys, the western valleys and the northern valleys.

== The valleys of Fuglafjørður ==
=== The eastern valleys ===
- Ytri Dalur (also called Kambsdalur)
- Heimari Dalur (sometimes called Breiðádalur)
- Innari Dalur (sometimes called Jøkladalur)

=== The western valleys ===
- Halgadalur
- Góðidalur

=== The northern valleys ===
- Flatirnar
- Hjarðardalur
