= Jákup Mikkelsen =

Faroese footballer (born 1970)

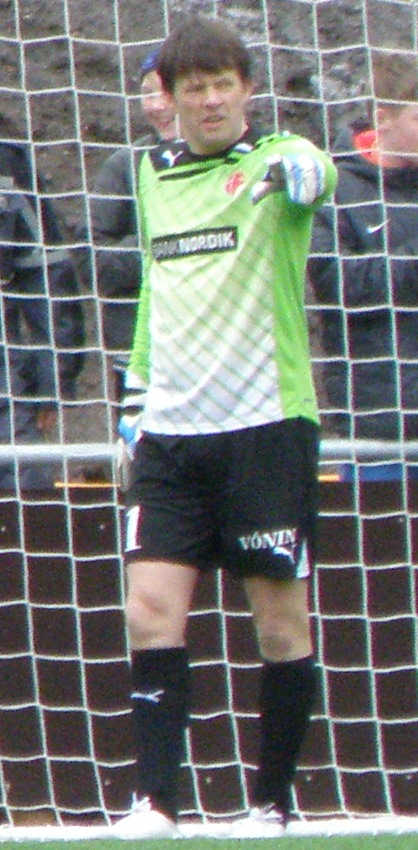
- Mikkelsen in 2012

Personal information
- Full name: Jákup Nolsøe Mikkelsen
- Date of birth: 14 August 1970 (age 56)
- Place of birth: Klaksvík, Faroe Islands
- Height: 1.83 m (6 ft 0 in)
- Position: Goalkeeper

Youth career
- KÍ Klaksvík

Senior career*
Years	Team	Apps	(Gls)
1991–1994	KÍ Klaksvík	75	(3)
1995–2001	Herfølge BK	136	(2)
2001–2003	Molde FK	11	(0)
2003–2004	Partick Thistle	5	(0)
2004	KÍ Klaksvík	23	(0)
2005–2007	B36 Tórshavn	97	(0)
2008–2009	KÍ Klaksvík	56	(0)
2010–2014	ÍF Fuglafjørður	118	(0)
2016	ÍF Fuglafjørður	1	(0)
Total		522	(5)

International career
1995–2012	Faroe Islands	73	(0)

Managerial career
- 2009: KÍ Klaksvík (player manager)
- 2015: ÍF Fuglafjørður
- 2016: ÍF Fuglafjørður
- 2016–2017: ÍF Fuglafjørður
- * Club domestic league appearances and goals

Jákup Nolsøe Mikkelsen (born 14 August 1970) is a Faroese former footballer who played as a goalkeeper. He made 522 league appearances in representing six clubs in a career spanning 25 years, also representing his country at international level.

A regular member of the Faroe Islands national team between 1995 and 2013, Mikkelsen won 73 caps, and in playing against Iceland on 16 August 2012 aged 42 years and one day, became the oldest goalkeeper ever to play an international match, the record that has since been surpassed by Colombian Faryd Mondragon.

Mikkelsen is a schoolteacher and goalkeeping coach for the Faroe Islands national team. He also sat in the city council of this native town of Klaksvík for one election period. In his youth, he worked as a postman in Klaksvík.

== Club career ==
Born in Klaksvík, Mikkelsen started at KÍ Klaksvík, where he sometimes was used as an outfield player, before moving abroad to play for several years in Denmark and Norway. In the 1999–2000 season, he only missed 2 games in Herfølge BK's title winning season, hence becoming the first ever Faroese to win a league championship in any other country than Faroes and he played both games against Rangers in their 2000–01 Champions League qualifying round and four more games in the UEFA Cup that season. He played 136 matches for Herfølge BK. After playing for Herfølge for five years Mikkelsen and his team won the Danish Championship. After a short spell at Scottish side Partick Thistle he returned to the Faroe Islands.

In early 2010 Mikkelsen signed a deal with Faroese football club ÍF Fuglafjørður.

Having made 118 league appearances for the club, Mikkelsen retired from playing football in November 2014 aged 44, stating that his advanced age had made it impossible for him to continue.

In 2016, Mikkelsen made a brief return to playing with ÍF, keeping a clean sheet in a 2–0 win at B68 Toftir on 18 September, and appeared on the substitutes' bench on a further five occasions.

== International career ==
He was a part of the squad as a reserve goalkeeper already as 18 years old in the summer of 1988, when Faroes played their very first international game after becoming full members of FIFA, losing 1–0 to Iceland in Akranes. However, Mikkelsen only made his debut for the Faroe Islands in July 1995 friendly match against Iceland and has since earned 72 caps. He was on the bench as early as in August 1988, when the Faroes played their first match since becoming a member of FIFA, in a friendly against Iceland in Akranes.

Although having retired after the 2010 World Cup qualification, he was called up out of retirement for the Euro 2012 qualifying matches against Slovenia and Northern Ireland in October 2010, because of an injury to Gunnar Nielsen.

== Honours ==
Individual

- Effodeildin Best Goalkeeper: 2012
- Effodeildin Team of the Season: 2012
