= 1943 Meistaradeildin =

Faroese football league season

Meistaradeildin
- Season: 1943
- Champions: TB Tvøroyri (1st title)
- Matches played: 4
- Goals scored: 16 (4 per match)

1943 Meistaradeildin was the second season of Meistaradeildin, the top tier of the Faroese football league system. The teams were separated into four groups based on geographical criteria; the winner of each group would qualify for the semi-finals. Each group had its own qualification format. TB Tvøroyri defeated MB Miðvágur 3–2 on aggregate in the championship final.

== Qualifying round ==
=== East ===
Pos	Team	Pld	W	D	L	GF	GA	GD	Pts	
1	KÍ Klaksvík	4	3	1	0	16	6	+10	7	Qualification to the semi-finals
2	HB Tórshavn	4	2	1	1	11	7	+4	5	
3	EB Eiði	4	0	0	4	6	20	−14	0	

Source: Faroe Soccer

=== Middle ===
The match was played on 20 June. A second leg was planned to be played on 25 July, but Sand withdrew after the first leg.

Team 1	Score	Team 2
Sand	1–6	B36 Tórshavn

=== West ===
MB advanced to the semifinals after SÍF and SÍ withdrew.

Pos	Team	Pld	W	D	L	GF	GA	GD	Pts	
1	MB Miðvágur	0	0	0	0	0	0	0	0	Qualification to the semi-finals
2	SÍ Sørvágur	0	0	0	0	0	0	0	0	Withdrew
3	SÍF Sandavágur	0	0	0	0	0	0	0	0	Withdrew

Source: Faroe Soccer

=== South ===
==== Preliminary round ====
Pos	Team	Pld	W	D	L	GF	GA	GD	Pts	
1	TB Tvøroyri	2	2	0	0	5	2	+3	4	Qualification to South final
2	TGB Trongisvágur	2	0	0	2	2	5	−3	0	
3	Royn Hvalba	0	0	0	0	0	0	0	0	Withdrew

Source: Faroe Soccer

Team 1	Agg.	Team 2	1st leg	2nd leg
FB Fámjin	1–5	ØB Øravík	1–3	0–2
VB Vágur	W.O.	Sumba	3–0	W.O.

==== Semi-final ====
The matches were scheduled to be played on 22 and 29 August, but ØB withdrew.

Team 1	Agg.	Team 2	1st leg	2nd leg
Sumba	W.O.	ØB Øravík	W.O.	W.O.

==== Final ====
Match played on 5 September.

Team 1	Score	Team 2
TB Tvøroyri	7–0	Sumba

== Semi-finals ==
Team 1	Score	Team 2
MB Miðvágur	3–1	KÍ Klaksvík
TB Tvøroyri	5–2	B36 Tórshavn

== Final ==
The matches were played at Gundadalur, Tórshavn. After the first game ended in a draw, a replay was needed to decide the champion.

Team 1	Agg.	Team 2	1st leg	2nd leg
MB Miðvágur	2–3	TB Tvøroyri	2–2	0–1
