= Ulrik Balling =

Danish footballer (born 1976)

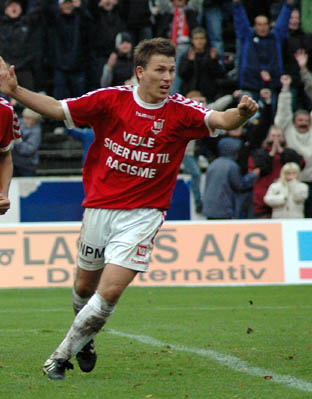

Personal information
- Date of birth: 11 June 1975 (age 51)
- Place of birth: Denmark
- Height: 1.76 m (5 ft 9 1/2 in)
- Position: Center forward

Team information
- Current team: Næstved BK (assistant)

Youth career
- 1980–1996: Slagelse B&I

Senior career*
Years	Team	Apps	(Gls)
1996–1997	Næstved IF		
1997–1998	Tromsø IL	10	(0)
1998–1999	Aarhus Fremad	35	(10)
1999–2008	Vejle Boldklub	186	(68)
2000	→ NSÍ Runavík (loan)		
2003–2004	→ Aarhus Fremad (loan)		
2008–2010	Næstved BK	59	(24)
2010–2012	FC Vestsjælland	41	(6)

International career
1997	Denmark U-21	1	(0)

Managerial career
- 2012–2014: FC Vestsjælland (assistant)
- 2016–2020: Slagelse B&I
- 2021–: Næstved BK (assistant)
- * Club domestic league appearances and goals

Ulrik Balling (born 11 June 1975) is a Danish retired professional football player who is currently the assistant manager of Næstved BK.
