= Hellurnar =

- Village
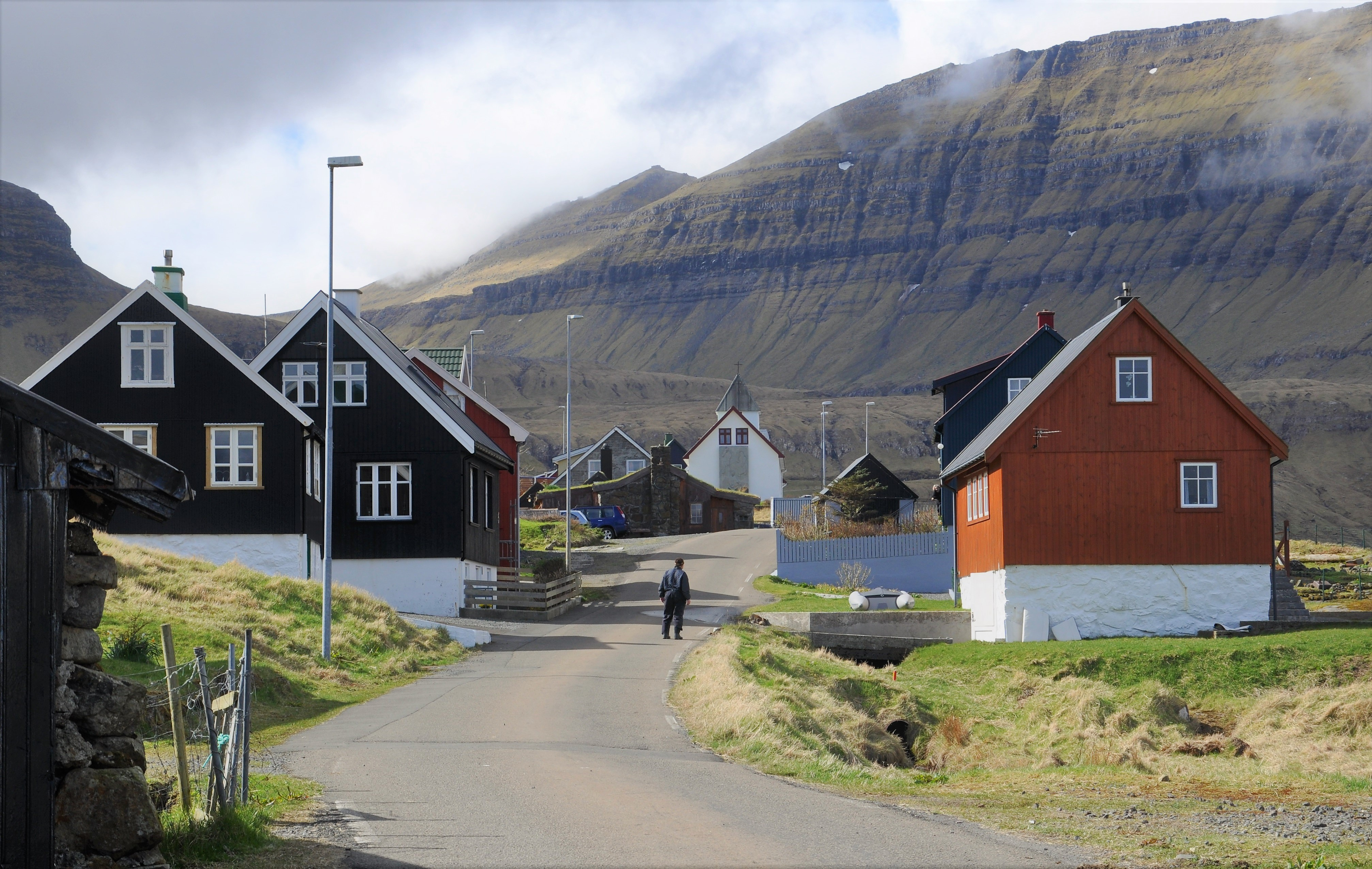
- Hellurnar

- Location in the Faroe Islands
- Coordinates: 62°15′49″N 6°50′40″W
- State: Kingdom of Denmark
- Constituent country: Faroe Islands
- Island: Eysturoy
- Municipality: Fuglafjørður
- Founded: 1849

Population (29 April 2025)
  - Total: 10
- Time zone: GMT
  - Summer (DST): UTC+1 (EST)
- Postal code: FO 695
- Climate: ET

Hellurnar (Danish: Heller) is a village in the Faroe Islands, on Oyndarfjørður (fjord), located on the east side of Eysturoy.

Hellurnar is part of the municipality of Fuglafjørður.

== History ==
Hellurnar was founded in 1849 by people from Lamba.

== See also ==
- List of towns in the Faroe Islands
