= Bartal Eliasen =

Faroese footballer (born 1976)

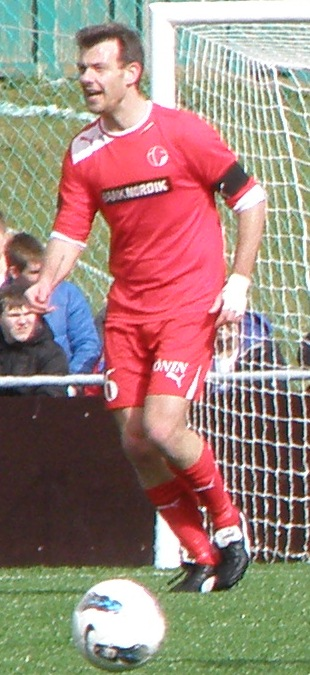

Personal information
- Date of birth: 23 August 1976 (age 50)
- Place of birth: Fuglafjørður, Faroe Islands
- Position: Defender

Team information
- Current team: ÍF Fuglafjørður

Senior career*
Years	Team	Apps	(Gls)
1993–1998	ÍF Fuglafjørður	77	(13)
1999–2003	GÍ Gøta	81	(19)
2004–	ÍF Fuglafjørður	249	(65)

International career^{‡}
1997–2009	Faroe Islands	6	(0)
- * Club domestic league appearances and goals as of 20 November 2015 ‡ National team caps and goals as of 31 December 2009

Bartal Eliasen (born 23 August 1976) is a Faroese international footballer who plays professionally as a defender for ÍF Fuglafjørður. Eliasen started his career in ÍF Fuglafjørður and has also played for GÍ Gøta. He has been capped for the Faroe Islands at senior level.

== International career ==
Eliasen has played a total of 6 matches for the Faroe Islands from 1997 to 2009.

== Individual honours ==
Effodeildin Team of the Season: 2012
