= Óli Johannesen =

Faroese footballer (born 1972)

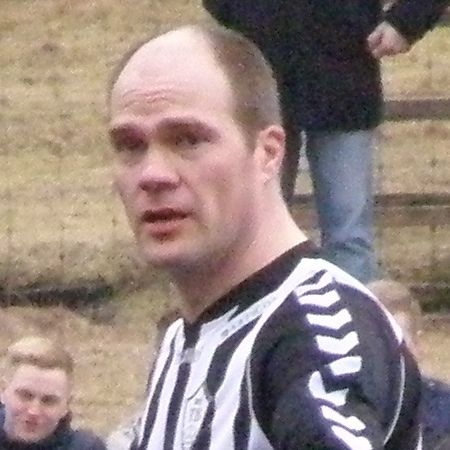
- Óli Johannesen, 2012

Personal information
- Date of birth: 6 May 1972 (age 54)
- Place of birth: Tvøroyri, Faroe Islands
- Height: 1.87 m (6 ft 2 in)
- Position: Defender

Team information
- Current team: TB Tvøroyri
- Number: 13

Senior career*
Years	Team	Apps	(Gls)
1992–1995	TB Tvøroyri	66	(12)
1996–1997	B36 Tórshavn	29	(13)
1998–1999	TB	13	(3)
1999–2001	Aarhus GF	16	(0)
2001–2004	Hvidovre IF	?	(?)
2004	TB	?	(?)
2005	TB	27	(7)
2006–2008	TB	69	(20)
2010–2011	TB	7	(3)
2012–	TB	23	(2)

International career
1992–2007	Faroe Islands	83	(1)
- * Club domestic league appearances and goals as of 25 September 2012

Óli Johannesen (born 6 May 1972) is a Faroese football player, currently playing for TB Tvøroyri.

== Club career ==
For most of his career, he has played in the Faroe Islands with TB Tvøroyri, but has also spent some seasons in the Danish league. He has spent recent years in the Faroe Islands second division with TB.

== International career ==
Johannesen made his debut for the Faroe Islands in an August 1992 friendly match against Israel.
