= 1951 Meistaradeildin =

Faroese football league season

Meistaradeildin
- Season: 1951
- Champions: TB Tvøroyri (3rd title)
- Matches played: 12
- Goals scored: 32 (2.67 per match)

1951 Meistaradeildin was the ninth season of Meistaradeildin, the top tier of the Faroese football league system. TB Tvøroyri won its third league title in the season.

== Overview ==
Pos	Team	Pld	W	D	L	GF	GA	GD	Pts
1	TB Tvøroyri (C)	6	5	0	1	13	6	+7	10
2	KÍ Klaksvík	6	2	1	3	7	5	+2	5
3	B36 Tórshavn	6	2	1	3	5	6	−1	5
4	HB Tórshavn	6	2	0	4	7	15	−8	4

Updated to match(es) played on unknown. Source:
(C) Champions

== Results ==
Home \ Away	B36	HB	KÍ	TB
B36 Tórshavn		1–2	1–1	0–2
HB	0–2		1–0	2–3
KÍ	0–1	4–0		2–1
TB	1–0	5–2	1–0	

Source: rsssf.com
Legend: Blue = home team win; Yellow = draw; Red = away team win.
