= 1949 Meistaradeildin =

Faroese football league season

Meistaradeildin
- Season: 1949
- Champions: TB Tvøroyri (2nd title)
- Matches played: 15
- Goals scored: 82 (5.47 per match)

1949 Meistaradeildin was the seventh season of Meistaradeildin, the top tier of the Faroese football league system. The league was in a league format, having six teams; every team played against each other once. TB Tvøroyri won its second championship in the season.

== Overview ==
Pos	Team	Pld	W	D	L	GF	GA	GD	Pts
1	TB Tvøroyri (C)	5	5	0	0	28	6	+22	10
2	HB Tórshavn	5	3	1	1	12	7	+5	7
3	B36 Tórshavn	5	2	2	1	19	12	+7	6
4	KÍ Klaksvík	5	2	1	2	10	10	0	5
5	HB Tórshavn II	5	1	0	4	8	19	−11	2
6	VB Vágur	5	0	0	5	5	28	−23	0

Updated to match(es) played on unknown. Source:
(C) Champions

== Results ==
Home \ Away	B36	HB	HB2	KÍ	TB	VB
B36 Tórshavn		2–2		2–2		10–4
HB Tórshavn			3–0		2–3 (Note: HB won the first encounter 2–1, but the match was rescheduled afterwards.)	
HB Tórshavn II	1–4			1–2		5–0
KÍ Klaksvík		2–3			2–3	
TB Tvøroyri	3–1		10–1			9–0
VB Vágur		0–2		1–2		

Source: rsssf.com
Legend: Blue = home team win; Yellow = draw; Red = away team win.
