= Abraham Løkin =

Faroese footballer (born 1959)

Personal information
- Full name: Abraham Løkin
- Date of birth: 16 June 1959 (age 67)
- Place of birth: Fuglafjørður, Faroe Islands
- Position: Midfielder

Senior career*
Years	Team	Apps	(Gls)
1976–1980	ÍF Fuglafjørður	35	(12)
1981	IK Sleipner		
1982–1984	NSÍ Runavík	13	(5)
1985	Odense Boldklub		
1986	NSÍ		
1987–1988	B36 Tórshavn		
1989	ÍF		
1989–1990	BK Frem		
1990–1991	ÍF		(14)
1992–1993	B68 Toftir	28	(6)
1993–1994	US Boulogne	?	(?)
1994	ÍF	5	(0)
1995–1996	B68	15	(0)
1996–1998	NSÍ	9	(1)
1999	ÍF	4	(1)
2000–2002	NSÍ	8	(0)

International career
1988–1994	Faroe Islands	36	(0)
- * Club domestic league appearances and goals

Abraham Løkin (born Abraham Hansen 16 June 1959, Fuglafjørður, Faroe Islands) is a former Faroe Islands Association football player and former manager of Faroese football club ÍF Fuglafjørður. He is the father of Elin Løkin, Bogi Løkin, Karl Løkin and Steffan Løkin.

In November 2003, to celebrate UEFA's jubilee, he was selected by the Faroe Islands Football Association as the country's Golden Player - the greatest player of the last 50 years.

== Club career ==
Løkin is Fuglafjørður's most famous player, serving his local team for many years as a midfielder. He also had spells in Sweden, Denmark and France as well as at Faroe club teams NSÍ Runavík and B68.

He is currently signed as the manager for ÍF Fuglafjørður for the 2009/2010 season, with the possibility for prolonging.

== International career ==
Løkin made his debut in an August 1988 friendly match against Iceland, the country's first FIFA-recognized match. He was a regular for the Faroe Islands in their first competitive years, earning a total of 22 caps (38 including unofficial matches). He played his last international match in September 1994 against Greece.

== Personal life ==
His son, Bogi Løkin, is also a Faroese international footballer and currently plays for ÍF Fuglafjørður along with his younger brother Karl Løkin, a Faroe Islands U21 player.
