= Marius Kryger Lindh =

Danish footballer (born 1999)

Personal information
- Date of birth: 22 June 1999 (age 27)
- Place of birth: Denmark
- Height: 1.85 m (6 ft 1 in)
- Position: Attacking midfielder

Team information
- Current team: NSÍ Runavík
- Number: 11

Youth career
- 2003–2011: Team AS
- 2012: Køge BK
- 2013–2016: Slagelse B&I

Senior career*
Years	Team	Apps	(Gls)
2017–2021	Slagelse B&I		
2022–2023	AB Argir	35	(8)
2024–2025	B36 Tórshavn	54	(17)
2026–	NSÍ Runavík	27	(6)
- * Club domestic league appearances and goals as of 17:25, 1 November 2026 (UTC)

Marius Kryger Lindh (born 22 June 1999) is a Danish professional footballer who plays as attacking midfielder for Faroe Islands Premier League club NSÍ Runavík.

== Club career ==
Marius Kryger Lindh started his senior career in the Danish club Slagelse B&I, where he debuted at 17 years old. In 2022 he moved to AB Argir where he soon became a profile. This paved the way for a transfer to B36 Tórshavn before the 2024 season.

After the 2024 season, Lindh was awarded player of the year by the supporters of B36 Tórshavn.

Lindh is one of the very few one armed players, who has participated in European club tournaments. That happened in 2024, where he played for B36 Tórshavn in UEFA Conference League against Auda from Latvia.

In 2026, he made history by becoming the first one-armed footballer to score in European club competition since the 1963–64 season. He scored for NSÍ Runavík in a 2–0 win over Slovenian side FC Koper, turning around a two-goal deficit from the first game; NSÍ Runavik won the tie after penalties. The previous—and until now only—such case occurred almost 63 years ago, when Northern Irish striker Jimmy Hasty of Dundalk found the net against Zürich in the European Cup.

== Personal life ==
Lindh was born without his right forearm, but this has never affected his football play. When performing physical training he uses a prosthesis.

== Honours ==
NSÍ Runavík

- Faroe Islands Premier League: 2026
