= Gjógvaráfjall =

Mountain overlooking the village of Vágur

Coordinates: 61°28′26″N 6°50′56″W

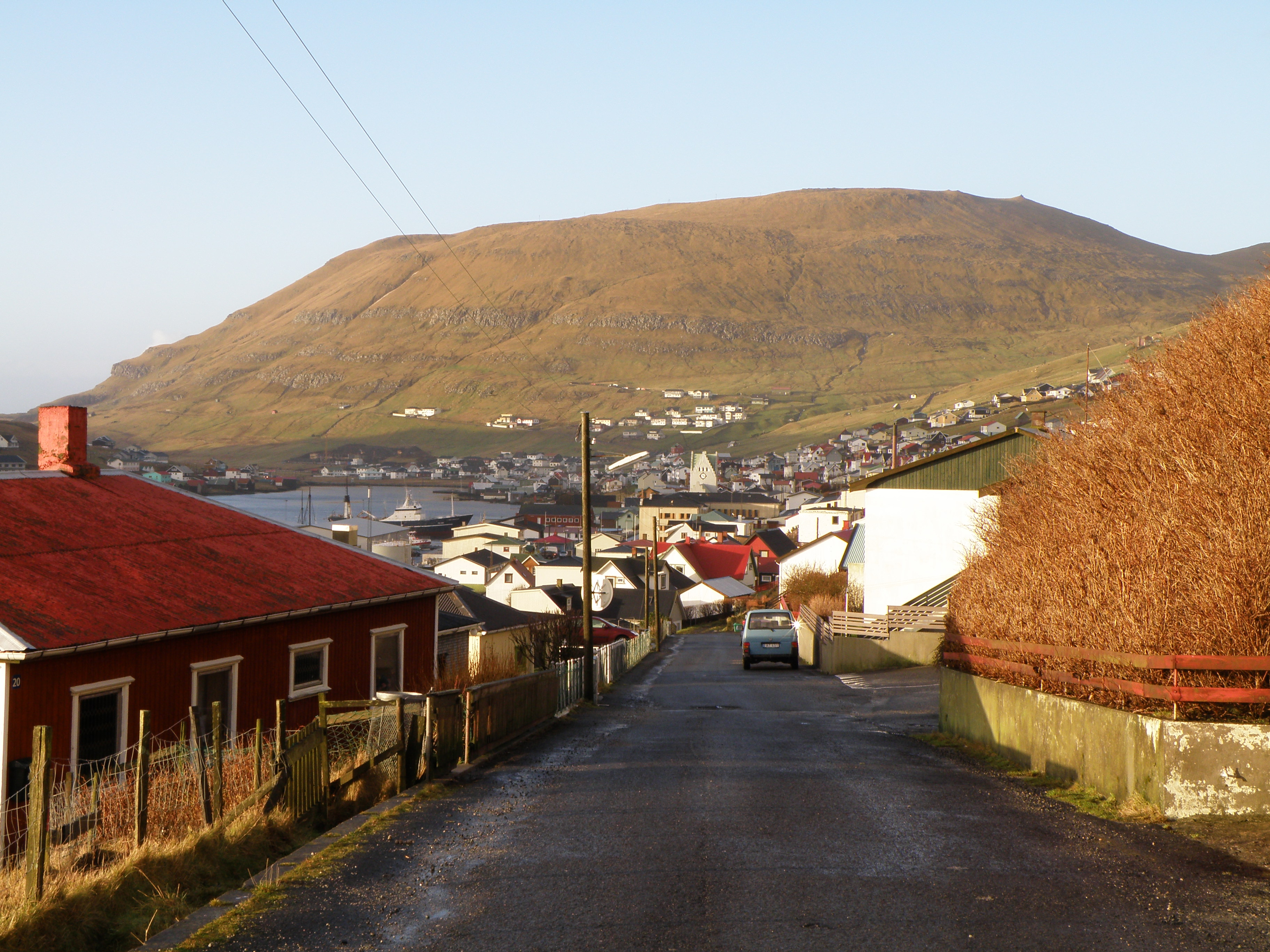
Gjógvarafjall and the village of Vágur in Suðuroy

Gjógvaráfjall is a 345-metre-high mountain overlooking the village of Vágur. The mountain is located north of Vágseiði in the western part of the village. Some of the houses in Vágur are located on Gjógavaráfjall. A little river is named after the mountain, it is called Gjógvará. "Á" in Faroese means 'river'. "Gjógv" is the Faroese word for 'gorge'.
