= Kambsdalur =

- Suburb
- Location in the Faroe Islands
- Coordinates: 62°14′40″N 6°48′52″W
- State: Kingdom of Denmark
- Constituent country: Faroe Islands
- Island: Eysturoy
- Municipality: Fuglafjørður
- Settled: 5 October 1985

Population (2006)
  - Total: 180
- Time zone: GMT
  - Summer (DST): UTC+1 (EST)
- Postal code: FO 530

Kambsdalur is a suburb of Fuglafjørður on the Faroe Islands.

It was settled on 5 October 1985 in the valley "Ytri Dalur" which is both a part of Eystur municipality and Fuglafjørður municipality. Nevertheless, the village of Kambsdalur only covers the Fuglafjørður-part of "Ytri Dalur", which was bought by the Fuglafjarðar kommuna in 1981. There is a high school in Kambsdalur.
