= Tvøroyrar Bóltfelag =

Faroese association football club

- Full name: Tvøroyrar Bóltfelag
- Short name: TB
- Founded: 13 May 1892; 134 years ago
- Ground: Við Stórá; Trongisvágur, Tvøroyri Municipality
- Capacity: 4,000 (324 seated)
- Chairman: André Dalfoss
- Manager: Rasmus Nolsøe
- League: 1. deild
- 2025: Faroe Islands Premier League, 10th of 10 (relegated)
- Website: http://www.tb.fo/
Home colours	Away colours

Tvøroyrar Bóltfelag is a Faroese professional football club from Tvøroyri, currently playing in the second tier of Faroese football. TB Tvøroyri is the oldest football club in the Faroe Islands, and also one of the oldest in the Danish Realm, in which the Faroe Islands are a self-governing country.

After the end of the 2016 season, it was decided on 15 December 2016 that the three clubs of the island Suðuroy, which are TB Tvøroyri, FC Suðuroy and Royn Hvalba would merge into a new club for the 2017 season. The merger will not be complete until 2018 and the name will be all three names together for the 2017 season: TB/FC Suðuroy/Royn. The three clubs have not been dissolved yet, they continue separately for the children's and women's teams. In 2017 it will only be the men's teams which will play for the new cooperation. In Faroese the new team is referred to as Suðuroyarliðið (the Suðuroy-team). The first head coach for the Suðuroy-team is the Scottish manager Maurice Ross. After two years the three clubs ended the co-operation and TB Tvøroyri continued to play with their licence which was for the Faroese Premier League. In 2020 TB became a member of the Club of Pioneers, a network of oldest football clubs.

== Honours ==
- Faroe Islands Premier League: 7
  - 1943, 1949, 1951, 1976, 1977, 1980, 1987
- Faroe Islands Cup: 5
  - 1956, 1958, 1960, 1961, 1977
- 1. deild: 4
  - 1948, 2001, 2004, 2014

== The squad ==
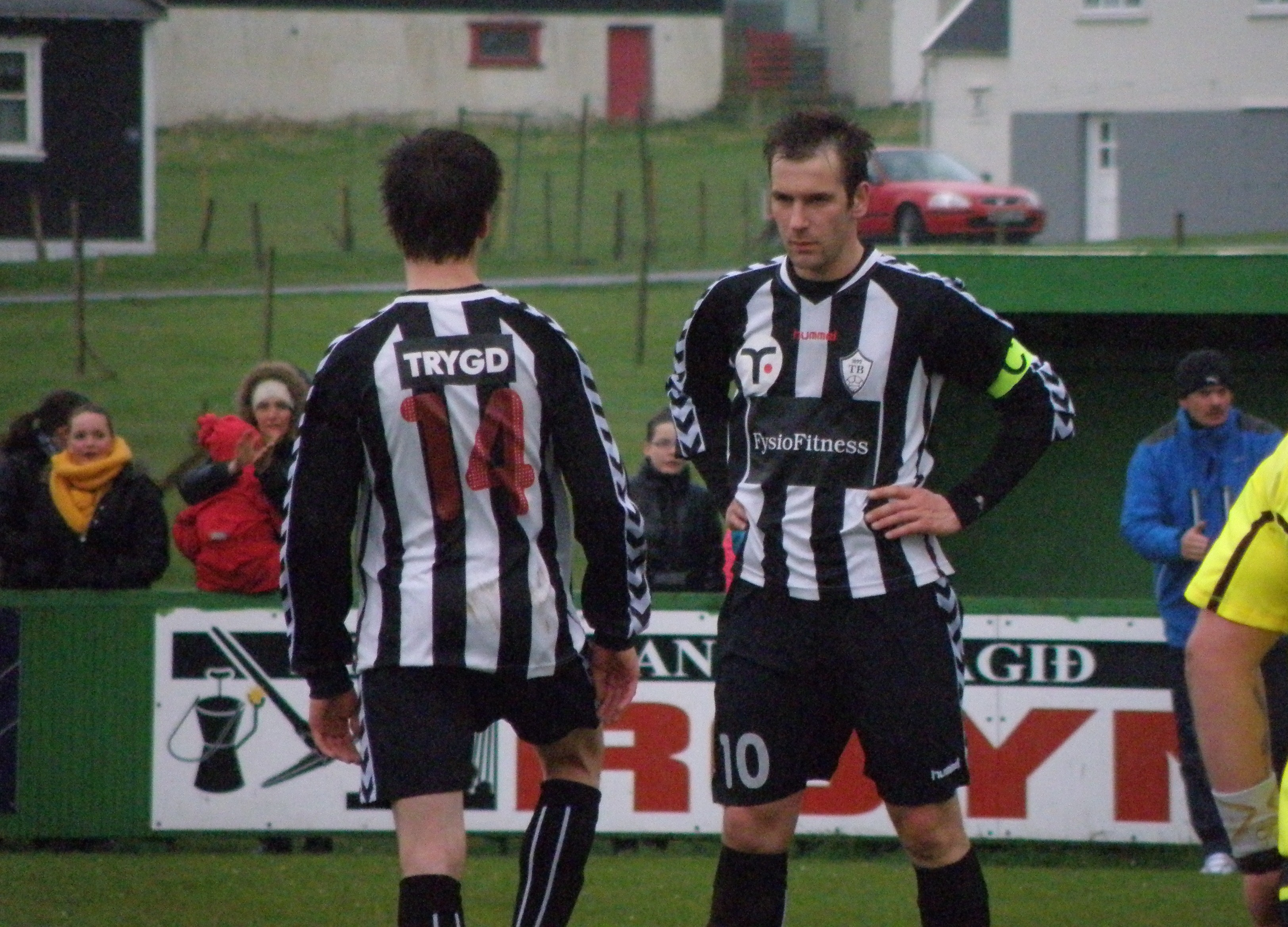
TB players in a match against FC Suðuroy, the players are Rógvi Joensen and Bárður A. Dimon

As of 10 August 2025.

Note: Flags indicate national team as defined under FIFA eligibility rules; some limited exceptions apply. Players may hold more than one non-FIFA nationality.

No.	Pos.	Nation	Player
1	GK	DEN	Anders Tønnesen
3	FW	FRO	Martin Johannesen
4	MF	SEN	Amidou Diop
5	DF	FRO	Ragnar Joensen
7	FW	ENG	Marley Blair (on loan from HB)
9	MF	FRO	Jóhan Thomsen
10	FW	GAM	Maha Samba (on loan from HB)
11	MF	FRO	Páll Eirik Djurhuus
12	GK	FRO	Olivur Øster
13	DF	FRO	Torkil Holm
14	MF	GHA	Musah Armah

No.	Pos.	Nation	Player
15	DF	SEN	Ndende Guéye
16	MF	FRO	Eyðtór Joensen
17	DF	FRO	Jónas Gaard (on loan from HB)
18	DF	FRO	Mikal Tummasarson
19	DF	FRO	Tummas Pauli Christiansson
20	DF	FRO	Eirikur Ellendersen
21	DF	FRO	Oddmar Jespersen
22	MF	FRO	Erik Johansen
23	MF	SWE	Joel Sundström
25	MF	GHA	Samudeen Musah
27	MF	DEN	Mikkel Kjærgaard
30	MF	FRO	Aron Arnholdsson

== The home fields in Sevmýri and við Stórá ==
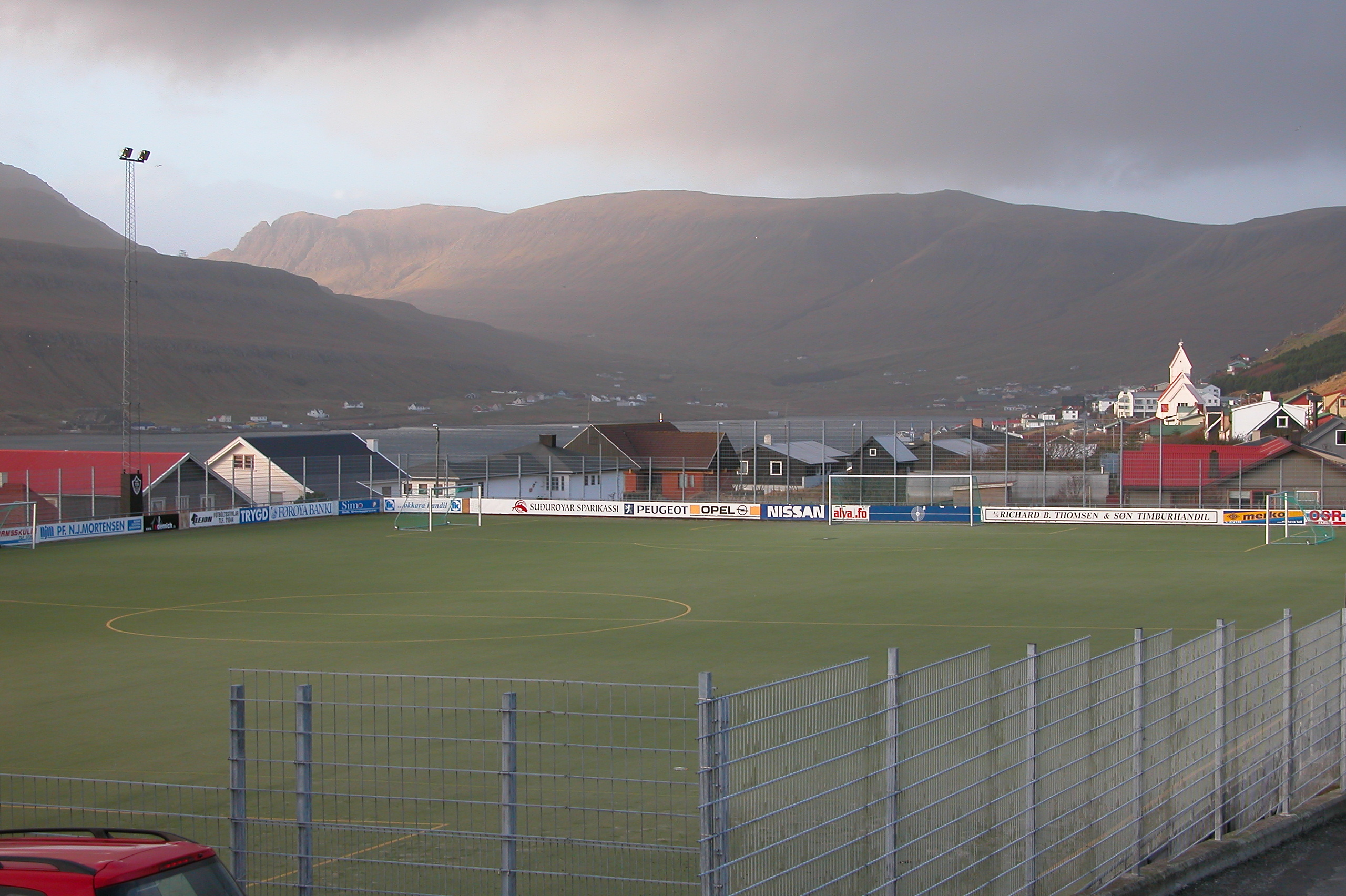
Sevmýri Stadium, former stadium of TB Tvøroyri

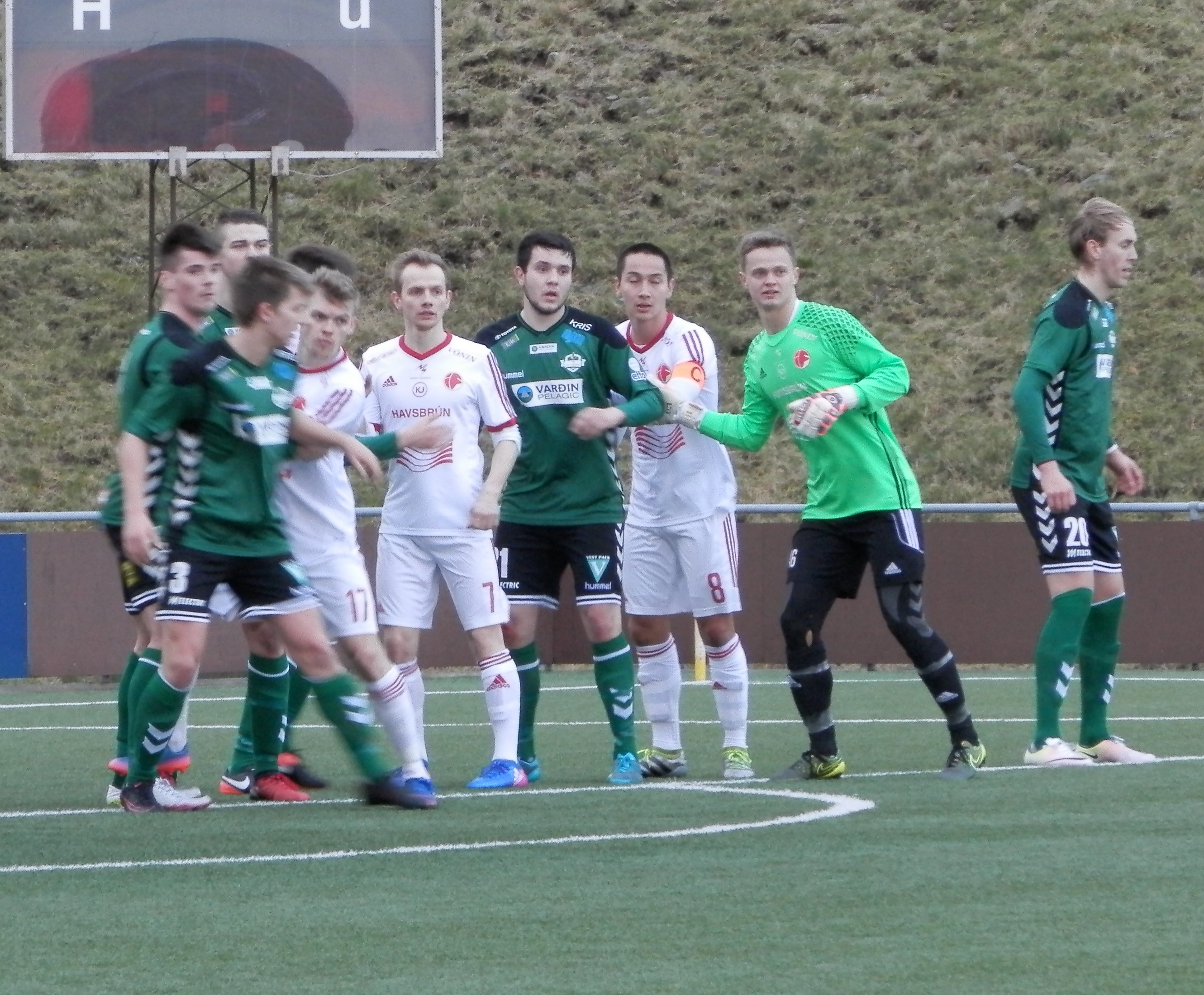
TB/FC Suðuroy/Royn in green playing their first match in Effodeildin in March 2017.

TB Tvøroyri used to play their home matches on Sevmýri Stadium, which is located in the eastern part of the town, near Froðba. But in 2011, the football field there was in such a bad shape, that the Faroe Islands Football Association could not allow any adult teams to play there. TB Tvøroyri therefore arranged with one of the neighbour villages, Hvalba, that they would play their matches there in 2011. On 17 November 2011, they started to build a new football stadium in Trongisvágur, just west of the sports hall, the place is called við Stórá (which means By Grand River). They worked very hard to get the new home field ready for the club's 120 years anniversary on 13 May 2012 and they made it. The new football field was ready in mid April, but it was not recognized for matches in the men's best division for the match against B36 Tórshavn as they had hoped for, the reason for this was that there were no seats yet, and the minimum demand for seats is 300. TB therefore played their home match against B36 Tórshavn in Vágur on 15 April 2012. They worked hard in order to get at least 300 seats around the football field, and that work finished on the Faroese flagday on 25 April 2012. Two days later on 27 April 2012, TB's new football field við Stórá was finally approved for matches in the men's best division. The football field officially opened on 29 April 2012. There was an opening ceremony just before TB played against ÍF Fuglafjørður, at the ceremony there were speeches by Andre Dalfoss, president of TB Tvøroyri and by Jens Johannesen, Chairman of Cultural Affairs of Tvøroyri Municipality and there was music by Tvøroyri Brass Band (Tvøroyrar Hornorkestur). Just a few minutes before the match started one of the former players of TB Tvøroyri Mr. Kristian Olsen, who at this time was 88 years old, got the honour to kick the first ball. TB Tvøroyri won this first match 1–0, the goal was scored by the Serbian player Dmitrije Janković.

== Notable former players ==
Former TB-players who have played for the Faroe Islands national football team:

- (Faroe Islands) Gilli Sørensen (plays on the national team and in the Norwegian Tippeliga)
- (Faroe Islands) Óli Johannesen (second most capped player of the Faroese national team)
- (Faroe Islands) Patrik Johannesen (plays on the national team)

== Managers ==
- (Faroe Islands) Sverre Midjord (1968–1971)
- (Denmark) Jørgen Marius Kølleskov (1972)
- (Faroe Islands) Sigmund Nolsøe (1983)
- (Faroe Islands) Henrik Thomsen (1983)
- (Iceland) Benadikt Valdisson (1984)
- (Denmark) John Rødgaard (1985)
- (Iceland) Egill Steintórsson (1986–87)
- (Denmark) Svend Petersen (1988)
- Hans Pauli Holm (April 1989 – June 89)
- (Denmark) Per Henning Jensen (1990)
- (Denmark) Finn Røntved (1991–92)
- (Faroe Islands) Dánjal Hofgaard (1993)
- (Poland) Jacek Burkhardt (1994)
- (Faroe Islands) Sigvald Steinkross (Oct 1995)
- (Denmark) Frank Skytte (March 1995 – Sept 95)
- (Iceland) Egill Steintórsson (Aug 1998 – Oct 98)
- (Iceland) Egill Steintórsson (March 1999 – April 99)
- (Denmark) Lynge Nielsen (March 2000 – April 00)
- (Denmark) Per Mikkelsen (March 2001 – April 01)
- (Norway) Håkon Winther (April 2001 – June 01)
- (Serbia) Milan Cimburović (Aug 2001 – Sept 01)
- (Serbia) Zoran Mančić (March 2002 – May 02)
- (Denmark) Lynge Nielsen (June 2002 – Sept 02)
- (Faroe Islands) Jón Johannesen (Sept 2002 – Oct 02)
- (Faroe Islands) Jón Johannesen (2004)
- (Serbia) Milan Milanović (2005)
- (Faroe Islands) Oddbjørn Joensen (Jan 1, 2006 – Dec 31, 2006)
- (Denmark) Jan Nielsen (Jan 2007 – April 13, 2007)
- (Serbia) Milan Cimburović (April 13, 2007 – July 07)
- (Poland) Krzysztof Popczyński (Aug 1, 2007 – July 5, 2008)
- (Faroe Islands) Jón Johannesen (July 31, 2008–??)
- (Faroe Islands) Pól Fríðrikur Joensen (2009)
- (Faroe Islands) Jón Johannesen (Jan 1, 2010 – Dec 31, 2011)
- (Serbia) Milan Kuljić (Jan 1, 2012 – Nov 30, 2012)
- (Faroe Islands) Hans Fróði Hansen (Jan 1, 2013 – July 23, 2013)
- (Faroe Islands) Bill McLeod Jacobsen (caretaker) (July 24, 2013 – Aug 11, 2013)
- (Iceland) Páll Guðlaugsson (Aug 12, 2013 – Oct 3, 2015)
- (Netherlands) Robert F. Roelofsen (Oct 3, 2015 – Jun 1, 2016)
- (Faroe Islands) Sigfríður Clementsen (Jun 6, 2016 – 31 Oct, 2016)
- (Germany) Michael Lundsgaard Winter (January 2020 – May 2021 )
- (Germany) Lars Heiliger (May 2021 - September 2021 )
- (England) Helen Lorraine Nkwocha (September 2021 - )

== Chairmen ==
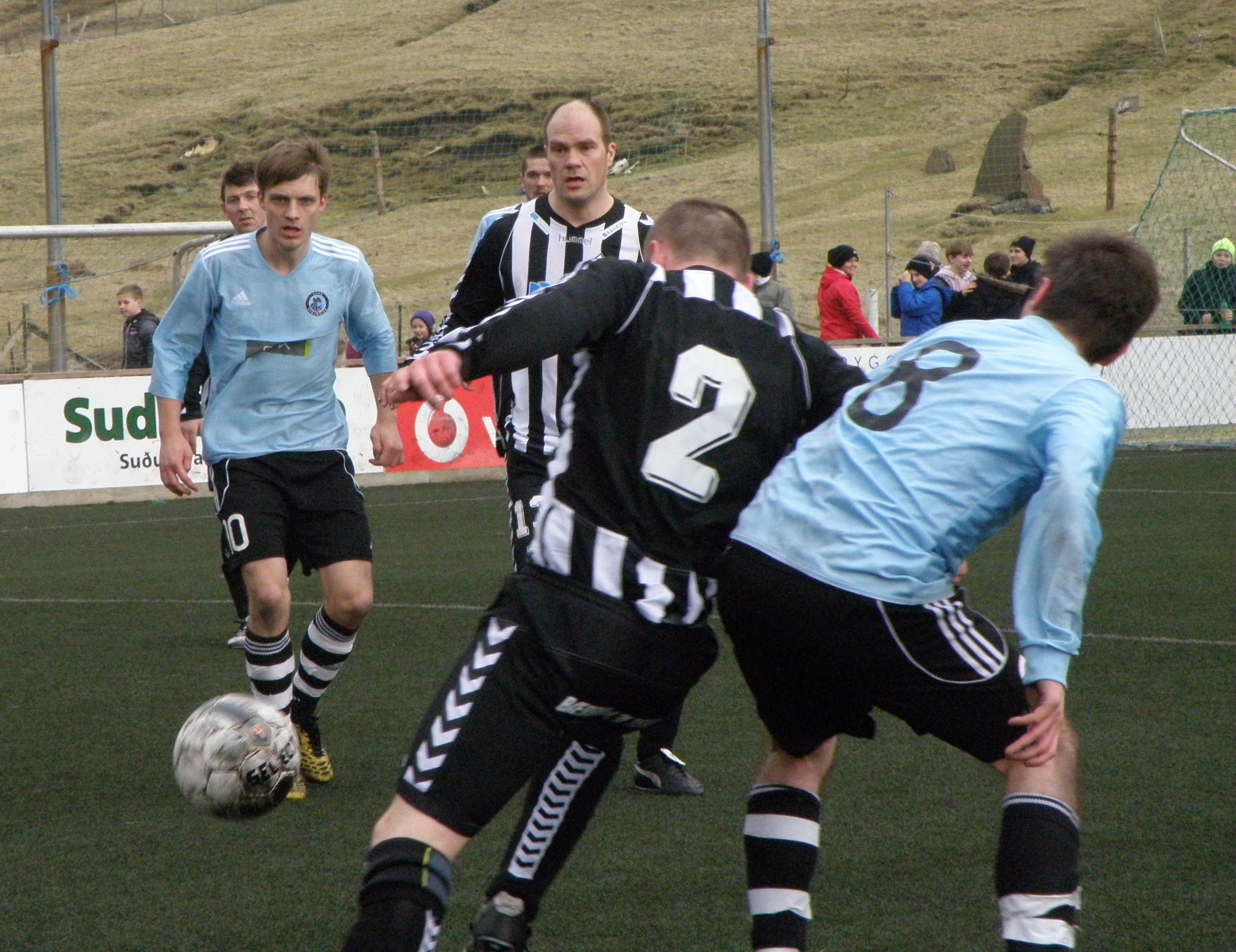
TB vs. Víkingur Gøta in Effodeildin 2012.

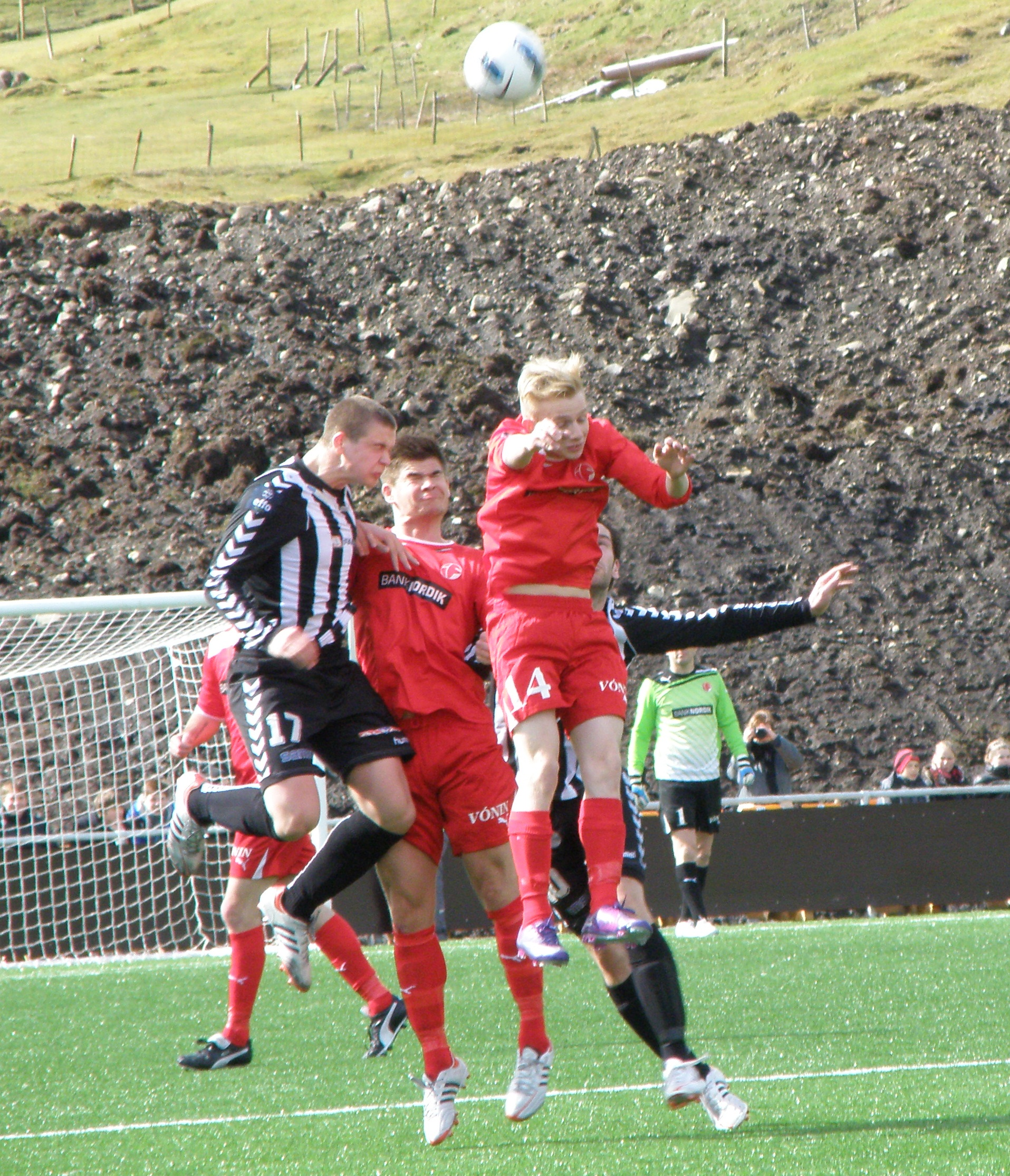
TB Tvøroyri vs. ÍF Fuglafjørður. This was the first match which was played on TB's new stadium Við Stórá on 29 April 2012.

- Reidar Simonsen (2020 –)
- Henrik Thomsen (2017 –2020)
- Poul Erik Smedemark (Nov 2016 –2017
- Niels Pauli Eystberg (Feb 2016 — Nov 2016)
- Fróði Olsen (March 2015 – Feb 2016)
- Egil Olsen (Nov 2014 – March 2015)
- Palli Eysturberg (Nov 2013 – Nov 2014)
- André Dalfoss (Oct 2009 – Nov 2013)
- Jóhan Petur Olgarsson (20??–Oct 09)
