= Fuglafjørður =

Fuglafjørður Fuglefjord (Danish)
- Municipality and village
- Fuglafjørður Municipality; Fuglafjarðar kommuna (Faroese)
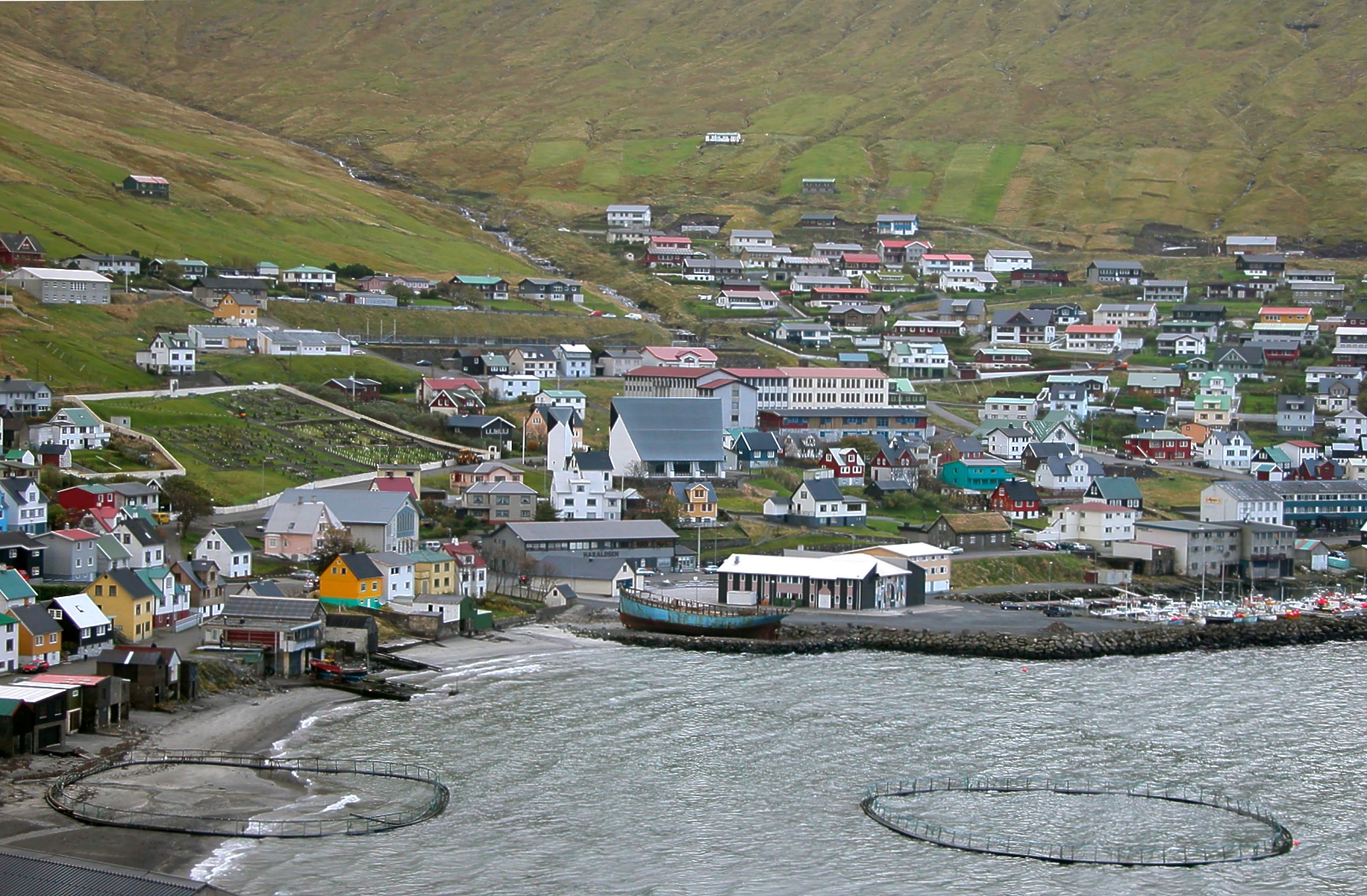
- Fuglafjørður

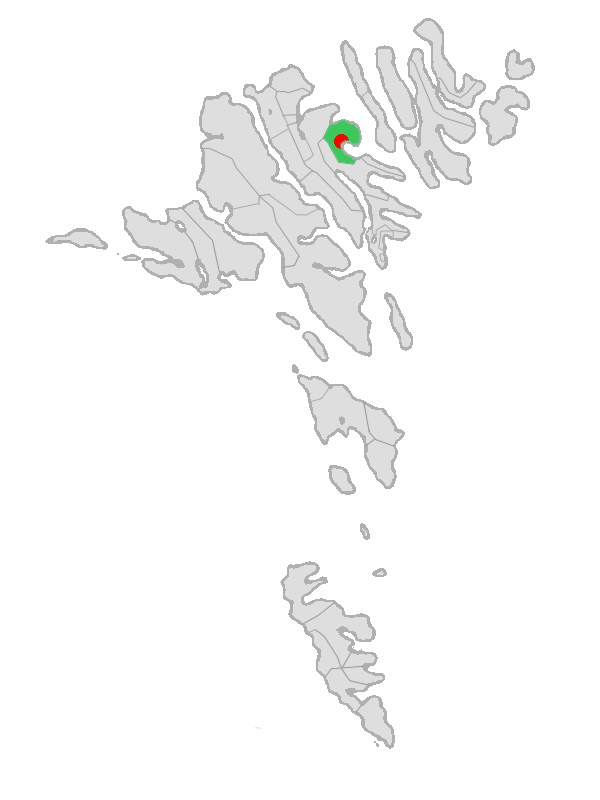
- Location of Fuglafjarðar kommuna in the Faroe Islands

- Location of Fuglafjørður in the Faroe Islands
- Coordinates: 62°14′40″N 6°48′52″W
- State: Kingdom of Denmark
- Constituent country: Faroe Islands
- Island: Eysturoy
- Municipality: Fuglafjarðar kommuna

Area
  - Municipality: 8.87 sq mi (22.97 km^{2})

Population (September 2025)
  - Total: 1,624
- Time zone: GMT
  - Summer (DST): UTC+1 (WEST)
- Postal code: FO 530
- Climate: Cfc
- Website: https://fuglafjordur.fo/

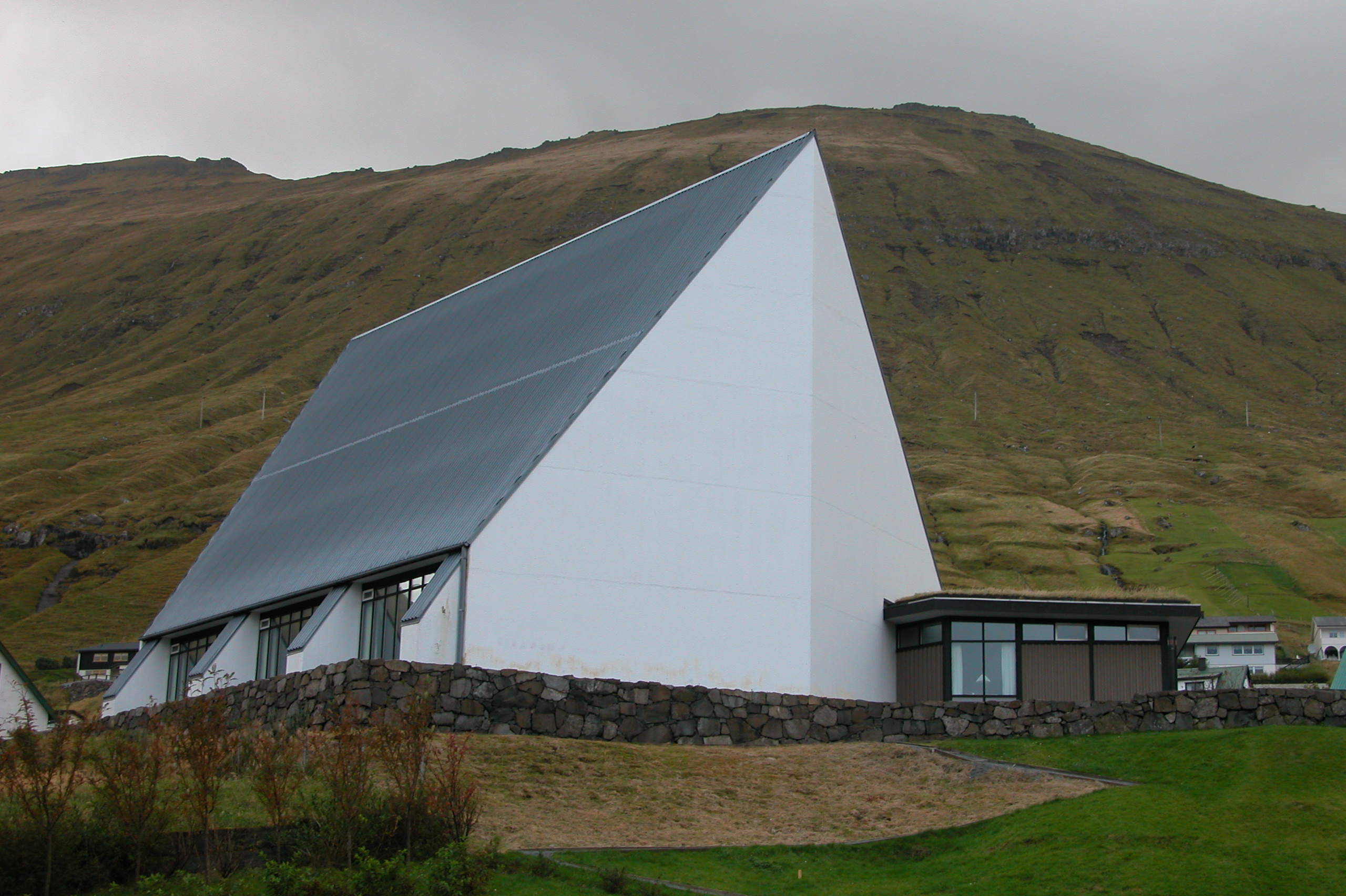
The ultra-modern church of 1984

Fuglafjørður (Danish: Fuglefjord) is a village on Eysturoy's east coast in the Faroe Islands. Its name means "fjord of birds".

The village is at the edge of a bay and expands into the surrounding steep hills. The town centre is located close to the harbour and contains most of the shops and services. The harbour in Fuglafjørður is busy, as the town's economy is based on the processing of fish and fish meal. There is fishing-industry, a slip, production of trawl and also oil-depots.

In the past years Fuglafjørður has also become famous for its newly established cultural centre in the town centre that has become one of the main cultural attractions in Eysturoy.

== History and development ==
Where the Gjógvará stream meets the sea in the village, archaeologists have discovered the remains of a Viking longhouse, seventeen metres 56 feet in length, with walls 1.5 metres (4 feet 11.1 inches) thick. It was found by removing four or five more recent layers of ruins, showing a continuity of habitation for many centuries.

In the 1840s the small village Hellur in north of Fuglafjørður was established. However this village never grew large and now only approximately 30 of the municipality's inhabitants live there.

In the 1980s the suburb of Kambsdalur was established, where around 180 people live. In Kambsdalur there is also a large industrial cluster, the educational centre of the northeastern Faroes and the regional sportscentre used mainly for handball, volleyball and indoor football.

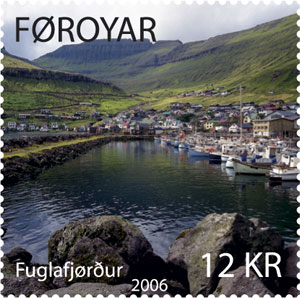
Faroese stamp FO 550: Fuglafjørður Date of issue: 13 February 2006

== Sports ==
The local football team is ÍF Fuglafjørður.

== Business ==
Fuglafjørður is (although its small size) home of many major business in the Faroe Islands. These include:

- Vónin, global provider of fishing gear such as trawls
- Framherji, operator of fishing ships
- Pelagos, one of the most advanced pelagic plants in the North Atlantic
- Sandgrevstur, owner and operator of cargo vessels
- KJ Hydralik, marine services
- JT Electric, one of the leading company in the world, producing and selling underwater lamps and cameras for the aquaculture
- Havsbrún, producer of fish feed

== Notable people ==
Notable people that were born or lived in Fuglafjørður include:

- Eilif Samuelsen (born 1934), teacher and politician
- Trygvi Samuelsen (1907–1985), lawyer
- Jógan á Lakjuni (born 1952), teacher, politician and composer
- Bartal Eliasen (born 1976), footballer
- Abraham Løkin (born 1959), footballer
- Høgni Zachariasen (born 1982), footballer

== Twin towns – sister cities ==
Fuglafjørður is twinned with:

- Aalborg, Denmark
- Húsavík, Iceland
- Ilulissat, Greenland

== See also ==
- List of towns in the Faroe Islands
