= NSÍ Runavík =

- Full name: Nes Sóknar Ítróttarfelag Runavík
- Founded: 24 March 1957; 69 years ago
- Ground: Runavík Stadium, Við Løkin; Runavík, Faroes
- Capacity: 2,000
- Chairman: Karstin Joensen
- Manager: Sigurður Ragnar Eyjólfsson
- League: Faroe Islands Premier League
- 2026: Faroe Islands Premier League, 1st of 10 (champions)
- Website: http://www.nsi.fo/
Home colours	Away colours

NSÍ Runavík is a Faroese professional football club, playing in Runavík on the island of Eysturoy. It was founded 24 March 1957.

In 2007, the club won the Faroe Islands Premier League for the first time. They won their second league title nineteen years later, in 2026.

The club has won the Faroe Islands Cup in 1986, 2002 and 2017. Aside from these instances, NSÍ Runavík featured in the 1980, 1985, 1988, 2004, 2015 and 2021 cup finals. They participated in Europe for the first time in 2003.

The club plays in yellow and black. Their stadium (Við Løkin) has a capacity of 2,000. It is not approved by UEFA for international play, so Runavík play their UEFA Europa League matches at Tórsvøllur in Tórshavn or Svangaskarð in Toftir. The main sponsor of NSÍ is Navigare, which is based in Runavík near Bakkafrost which is the largest salmon-farming company in the Faroe Islands. It is one of the biggest private employers in the islands, if not the biggest.

== Honours ==
- Faroe Islands Premier League
  - Champions (2): 2007, 2026
  - Runners-up (4): 2002, 2015, 2018, 2020
- Faroe Islands second tier (1. deild since 2005)
  - Champions (5): 1978, 1983, 1990, 1993, 1996
  - Runners-up (1): 1982
- Faroe Islands Cup
  - Winners (3): 1986, 2002, 2017
  - Runners-up (6): 1980, 1985, 1988, 2004, 2015, 2021
- Faroe Islands Super Cup
  - Winners (1): 2008
  - Runners-up (2): 2018, 2021

== Current squad ==
As of 6 August 2026

Note: Flags indicate national team as defined under FIFA eligibility rules; some limited exceptions apply. Players may hold more than one non-FIFA nationality.

No.	Pos.	Nation	Player
1	GK	FRO	Kristian Joensen
2	MF	DEN	Sammy Skytte
3	DF	FRO	Viljormur Davidsen
4	DF	DEN	Daniel Obbekjær
5	DF	ISL	Alex Freyr Elísson
6	MF	FRO	Beinir Nolsøe
7	MF	FRO	Aron Knudsen
8	MF	FRO	Brandur Hendriksson
9	FW	NOR	Tobias Hestad
10	FW	FRO	Klæmint Andrasson Olsen
11	MF	DEN	Marius Kryger Lindh
12	DF	SWE	Filip Drinic

No.	Pos.	Nation	Player
13	GK	SWE	Tom Amos
15	DF	FRO	Pætur Hentze
16	FW	FRO	Petur Knudsen
17	DF	FRO	Jann Benjaminsen
18	MF	FRO	Morits Heini Mortensen
23	MF	FRO	Benadiktus Olsen
28	FW	FRO	Markus Danielsen
29	MF	FRO	Emil Weihe Joensen
30	GK	FRO	Dánial Danielsen
32	DF	FRO	Bárður Hansen
33	FW	POL	Michał Przybylski
45	FW	FRO	Meinhard Olsen

== Former players ==
- (Hungary) András Gángó

== European record ==
=== Overview ===
Competition	Matches	W	D	L	GF	GA
UEFA Champions League	2	1	0	1	1	3
UEFA Cup / UEFA Europa League	24	2	2	20	18	71
UEFA Europa Conference League	10	3	3	4	13	17
UEFA Intertoto Cup	2	0	0	2	1	7
TOTAL	38	6	5	27	33	98

=== Matches ===
Season	Competition	Round	Club	Home	Away	Aggregate
2003–04	UEFA Cup	QR	(Norway) FK Lyn	1–3	0–6	1–9
2004	UEFA Intertoto Cup	1R	(Denmark) Esbjerg fB	0–4	1–3	1–7
2005–06	UEFA Cup	1Q	(Latvia) Liepajas Metalurgs	0–3	0–3	0–6
2008–09	UEFA Champions League	1Q	(Georgia (country)) Dinamo Tbilisi	1–0	0–3	1–3
2009–10	UEFA Europa League	1Q	(Norway) Rosenborg BK	0–3	1–3	1–6
2010–11	UEFA Europa League	1Q	(Sweden) Gefle IF	0–2	1–2	1–4
2011–12	UEFA Europa League	1Q	(England) Fulham	0–0	0–3	0–3
2012–13	UEFA Europa League	1Q	(Luxembourg) Differdange	0–3	0–3	0–6
2015–16	UEFA Europa League	1Q	(Northern Ireland) Linfield	4–3	0–2	4–5
2016–17	UEFA Europa League	1Q	(Belarus) Shakhtyor Soligorsk	0–2	0–5	0–7
2017–18	UEFA Europa League	1Q	(Belarus) Dinamo Minsk	0–2	1–2	1–4
2018–19	UEFA Europa League	1Q	(Scotland) Hibernian	4–6	1–6	5–12
2019–20	UEFA Europa League	PR	(Northern Ireland) Ballymena United	0–0	0–2	0–2
2020–21	UEFA Europa League	PR	(Wales) Barry Town United	5–1	—N/a	—N/a
2020–21	UEFA Europa League	1Q	(Scotland) Aberdeen	—N/a	0–6	—N/a
2021–22	UEFA Europa Conference League	1Q	(Finland) Honka	1–3	0–0	1–3
2025–26	UEFA Conference League	1Q	(Finland) HJK	4–0	0–5 (a.e.t.)	4–5
2026–27	UEFA Conference League	1Q	(Malta) Hamrun Spartans	1–1	2–1	3–2
2026–27	UEFA Conference League	2Q	(Slovenia) Koper	0–2	3–1 (a.e.t.)	3–3 (4–3 (p))
2026–27	UEFA Conference League	3Q	(Switzerland) Lugano	2–2	0–2	2–4
2027–28	UEFA Champions League	1Q				

Notes

- 1R: First round
- QR: Qualifying round
- PR: Preliminary round
- 1Q: First qualifying round

== Managers ==
- (Faroe Islands) Abraham Løkin (1984)
- (Faroe Islands) Asbjørn Mikkelsen (1984)
- (England) Ian Salter (January 1985 – Nov 85)
- (Faroe Islands) Abraham Løkin (1986)
- (Faroe Islands) Poli Justinussen (1987)
- (Denmark) Kim Truesen (1988)
- (Faroe Islands) Petur Mohr (1990)
- (England) Bobby Bolton (January 1991 – May 92)
- (Faroe Islands) Trygvi Mortensen (May 1992 – December 92)
- (Faroe Islands) Petur Simonsen (January 1993 – December 94)
- (England) Ian Salter (January 1995 – July 95)
- (Faroe Islands) Meinhard Dalbúð & (Faroe Islands) Jógvan Nordbúð (August 1995 – December 95)
- (Faroe Islands) Petur Mohr (January 1997 – December 98)
- (Serbia) Milan Cimburovic (January 1999 – April 99)
- (Faroe Islands) Trygvi Mortensen (May 1999 – December 00)
- (Faroe Islands) Petur Mohr (January 2001 – 1 December)
- (Faroe Islands) Jógvan Martin Olsen (January 2002 – 4 December)
- (Faroe Islands) Trygvi Mortensen (January 2005 – 6 August)
- (Faroe Islands) Arnfinn Langgaard & (Faroe Islands) Bogi Lervig (Sept 2006 – 6 December)
- (Faroe Islands) Jóhan Nielsen (1 January 2007 – 31 December 2008)
- (Faroe Islands) Pauli Poulsen (1 January 2009 – 31 December 2011)
- (Faroe Islands) Kári Reynheim (1 January 2012 – 31 December 2012)
- (Faroe Islands) Abraham Løkin (1 January 2013 – 30 June 2013)
- (Faroe Islands) Heðin Askham (1 July 2013 – 31 December 2013)
- (Faroe Islands) Trygvi Mortensen (1 January 2014 – 31 December 2015)
- (Denmark) Anders Gerber (1 January 2016 – 6 October 2017)
- (Faroe Islands) Sámal Erik Hentze (2 November 2017 – 2 November 2018)
- (Iceland) Guðjón Þórðarson (3 November 2018 – 29 November 2019)
- (Sweden) Glenn Ståhl (29 October 2019 – 29 September 2020)
- (Denmark) Allan K. Jepsen (24 October 2020 – 28 July 2021)
- (Faroe Islands) Bill McLeod Jacobsen (4 August 2021 – 4 December 2021)
- (Faroe Islands) Todi Jónsson (14 January 2022 – 1 June 2022)
- (Faroe Islands) Sámal Erik Hentze (1 July 2022 – 26 September 2023)
- (Faroe Islands) Christian Høgni Jacobsen (27 September 2023 – 31 December 2023)
- (Sweden) Jens Wedeborg (1 January 2024 – 31 December 2025)
- (Iceland) Sigurður Ragnar Eyjólfsson (1 January 2026 – present)

== Top tier scorer ==
Season	Goalscorer	Goals				
Season	Goalscorer	Premier League	FI Cup	FI Supercup	Europa League	Total
2007 -	Klæmint Olsen	231	24	1	7	263
