= Ítróttarfelag Fuglafjarðar =

Association football club in the Faroe Islands

ÍF
- Full name: Ítróttarfelag Fuglafjarðar
- Founded: 25 March 1946; 79 years ago
- Ground: Í Fløtugerði
- Capacity: 1,200 (360 seated)
- Chairman: Georges Rouah
- Manager: Kristoffer Kvistgaard
- League: 1. deild
- 2025: 1. deild, 5th of 10
- Website: www.if.fo
Home colours	Away colours

Ítróttarfelag Fuglafjarðar, abbreviated to ÍF, is a Faroese football club based in Fuglafjørður. They play their home games at Í Fløtugerði. The 1979 Faroe Islands Premier League title is ÍF's sole to date. They also won the 1. deild (second tier) four times.

== History ==
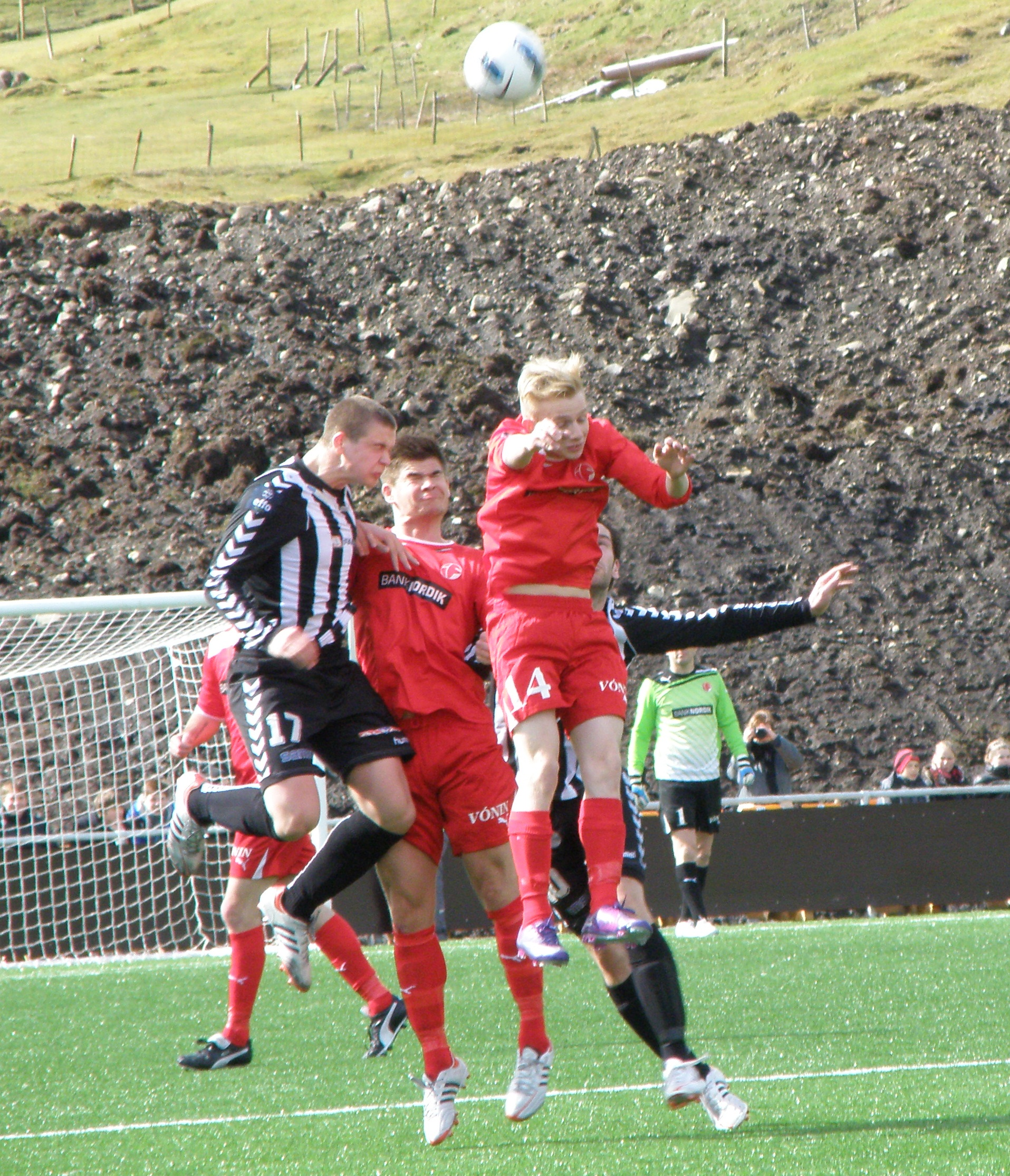
TB Tvøroyri vs. ÍF Fuglafjørður on 29 April 2012. TB won 1–0.

ÍF has never won the cup title. The team has lost 6 finals: in 1975 to HB Tórshavn by 7–4 in a two-legged final; in 1982 once again to HB by 2–1; in 1987, ÍF lost its third final to HB in a row after the replay, which HB won by 3–0; in 2005 to GÍ Gøta by 4–1; and most recently, in 2010 and 2011 to EB/Streymur by 1–0 & 3–0, respectively.

== Stadium ==
Ítróttarfelag Fuglafjarðar plays its games in Í Fløtugerði, a stadium with a seating capacity of 360 (1,200 with standing places).

The stadium was renovated in 2008.

== Current squad ==
As of 3 September 2024.

Note: Flags indicate national team as defined under FIFA eligibility rules; some limited exceptions apply. Players may hold more than one non-FIFA nationality.

No.	Pos.	Nation	Player
1	GK	FRO	Jákup Jónsson Nolsøe
3	DF	DEN	Peter Spangsgaard Ullum
4	DF	FRO	Tóri Nolsøe Olsen
5	DF	FRO	Símun Kalsø (on loan from KÍ)
6	MF	FRO	Karl Abrahamsson Løkin
7	FW	FRO	Dánjal á Lakjuni
8	MF	FRO	Bogi Reinert-Petersen
9	FW	SRB	Uroš Stojanov
10	MF	DEN	Ruben Møller Nielsen
11	MF	FRO	Markus á Lakjuni
12	FW	FRO	Hans Jákup Jóhannesson Lervig
13	MF	FRO	Jógvan á Lakjuni
14	MF	FRO	Gundur Ellingsgaard Petersen

No.	Pos.	Nation	Player
15	GK	FRO	Kenny Jensen
16	MF	FRO	Jóhann Jøkladal Højbro
18	DF	FRO	Petur Meinhard Lundsbjerg
19	FW	FRO	Rúnar Johnsson
20	MF	FRO	Tonni Jóhannus Thomsen
21	MF	FRO	Jákup Andrias Thomsen
22	DF	FRO	Elias Jóhannessen Lervig
23	DF	FRO	Rógvi Matras
24	DF	FRO	Bergur Jacobsen
26	FW	FRO	Aron Kensson
30	FW	FRO	Silas Gaard (on loan from KÍ)

== Managers ==
- (Iceland) Páll Guðlaugsson (1989–1991)
- (Faroe Islands) Meinhard Dalbúð (1993–1994)
- (Faroe Islands) Sonni Jensen (1995)
- (Faroe Islands) Petur Simonsen (1996–1997)
- (Poland) Piotr Krakowski (1998–1999)
- (Faroe Islands) Pauli Jarnskor (2001–2002)
- (Faroe Islands) Bogi Lervig (2002)
- (Faroe Islands) Petur Mohr (2002–2003)
- (Faroe Islands) Sigfríður Clementsen (2003–2004)
- (Faroe Islands) Petur Mohr (2004–2005)
- (Faroe Islands) Petur Simonsen (2005–2006)
- (Faroe Islands) Jón Simonsen (2006–2007)
- (Faroe Islands) Abraham Løkin (2008)
- (Faroe Islands) Roy Róin (2008)
- (England) David Jones (2008)
- (Faroe Islands) Albert Ellefsen (2008)
- (Faroe Islands) Jón Simonsen (2009)
- (Faroe Islands) Jón Simonsen & (Faroe Islands) Abraham Løkin (2009–2010)
- (Faroe Islands) Abraham Løkin (2010–2011)
- (Faroe Islands) Símun Eliasen & (Faroe Islands) Rúni Nolsøe (2011)
- (Denmark) Flemming Christensen (2012)
- (Faroe Islands) Albert Ellefsen (2013–2015)
- (Faroe Islands) Jákup Mikkelsen (2015)
- (Faroe Islands) Jógvan Martin Olsen (2016)
- (Faroe Islands) Jákup Mikkelsen & (Faroe Islands) Símun Eliasen (2016)
- (Faroe Islands) Jákup Mikkelsen (2017)
- (Faroe Islands) Oddbjørn Joensen & (Faroe Islands) Albert Ellefsen (2017)
- (Faroe Islands) Hegga Samuelsen (2018–2019)
- (Faroe Islands) Ólavur Larsen (2019)
- (Faroe Islands) Kári Reynheim & (Faroe Islands) Hans Jørgen Djurhuus (2019)
- (Faroe Islands) Hans Jørgen Djurhuus & (Faroe Islands) Ólavur Larsen (2019)

== Honours ==
- Faroe Islands Premier League: 1
  - 1979
- 1. deild: 4
  - 1984, 1987, 2003, 2018

== European record ==
Season	Competition	Round	Opponents	Home	Away	Aggregate
2011–12	UEFA Europa League	First qualifying round	(Iceland) KR Reykjavik	1–3	1–5	2–8
2013–14	UEFA Europa League	First qualifying round	(Northern Ireland) Linfield	0–2	0–3	0–5
2014–15	UEFA Europa League	First qualifying round	(Finland) MYPA	0–0	0–1	0–1
