= 2013 Faroe Islands Premier League =

Football

Effodeildin
- Season: 2013
- Champions: HB (22nd title)
- Relegated: 07 Vestur; TB
- Champions League: HB
- Europa League: Víkingur (via Faroe Cup); ÍF; B36
- Matches: 135
- Goals: 463 (3.43 per match)
- Top goalscorer: Klæmint Olsen (NSÍ – 21 goals)
- Biggest home win: KÍ 7–1 07 Vestur (R27); EB/Streymur 6–0 AB (R8); HB 6–0 07 Vestur (R24)
- Biggest away win: NSÍ 0–4 HB (R8); TB 1–5 HB (R18)
- Highest scoring: KÍ 7–1 07 Vestur (R27)

2013 Faroe Islands Premier League was the seventy-first season of top-tier football on the Faroe Islands. For sponsorship reasons, it is known as Effodeildin. EB/Streymur were the defending champions.

== Teams ==
B68 Toftir and FC Suðuroy had finished 9th and 10th respectively at the end of the previous season and were relegated to the 1. deild as a result.

Replacing them were the 1. deild champions 07 Vestur and runners-up AB Argir.

=== Team summaries ===
Locations of the Faroe Islands Premier League 2013 teams

Team	City	Stadium	Capacity	Manager
07 Vestur	Sørvágur	á Dungasandi	2,000	(Faroe Islands) Hegga Samuelsen
AB Argir	Argir	Inni í Vika	2,000	(Faroe Islands) Sámal Erik Hentze
B36 Tórshavn	Tórshavn	Gundadalur	5,000	(Faroe Islands) Mikkjal Thomassen
EB/Streymur	Streymnes	við Margáir	1,000	(Faroe Islands) Rúni Nolsøe
Havnar Bóltfelag	Tórshavn	Gundadalur	5,000	(Faroe Islands) Oddbjørn Joensen
ÍF Fuglafjørður	Fuglafjørður	í Fløtugerði	3,000	(Faroe Islands) Albert Ellefsen
KÍ Klaksvík	Klaksvík	Við Djúpumýrar	3,000	(Faroe Islands) Eyðun Klakstein
NSÍ Runavík	Runavík	við Løkin	2,000	(Faroe Islands) Heðin Askham
TB Tvøroyri	Tvøroyri	Við Stórá	4,000	(Iceland) Páll Guðlaugsson
Víkingur Gøta	Norðragøta	Sarpugerði	3,000	(Faroe Islands) Sigfríður Clementsen

=== Managerial changes ===
Team	Outgoing manager	Manner of departure	Date of vacancy	Position in table	Incoming manager	Date of appointment
KÍ	(Iceland) Páll Guðlaugsson	Mutual agreement	12 June	4th	(Faroe Islands) Eyðun Klakstein	12 June
NSÍ	(Faroe Islands) Abraham Løkin	Mutual agreement	30 June	5th	(Faroe Islands) Heðin Askham	30 June
Víkingur	(Faroe Islands) Jogvan Martin Olsen	Mutual agreement	1 July	8th	(Faroe Islands) Sigfríður Clementsen	1 July
TB	(Faroe Islands) Hans Fróði Hansen	Sacked	24 July	7th	(Faroe Islands) Bill McLeod Jacobsen (caretaker)	24 July
TB	(Faroe Islands) Bill McLeod Jacobsen	End as caretaker	17 August	9th	(Iceland) Páll Guðlaugsson	17 August
07 Vestur	(Poland) Piotr Krakowski	Sacked	1 October	10th	(Faroe Islands) Hegga Samuelsen	1 October

== League table ==
Pos	Team	Pld	W	D	L	GF	GA	GD	Pts	Qualification or relegation
1	HB (C)	27	16	6	5	68	34	+34	54	Qualification for the Champions League first qualifying round
2	ÍF	27	14	7	6	55	48	+7	49	Qualification for the Europa League first qualifying round
3	B36 Tórshavn	27	12	10	5	48	35	+13	46	Qualification for the Europa League first qualifying round
4	NSÍ Runavík	27	13	6	8	54	47	+7	45	
5	EB/Streymur	27	12	5	10	55	36	+19	41	
6	Víkingur Gøta	27	12	5	10	41	42	−1	41	Qualification for the Europa League first qualifying round (Note: Víkingur qualified for the first qualifying round of UEFA Europa League by winning the 2013 Faroe Islands Cup.)
7	AB	27	9	4	14	36	48	−12	31	
8	KÍ	27	6	10	11	54	55	−1	28	
9	TB (R)	27	5	8	14	27	48	−21	23	Relegation to 1. deild
10	07 Vestur (R)	27	3	5	19	25	70	−45	14	Relegation to 1. deild

Source: Soccerway
Rules for classification: 1) points; 2) goal difference; 3) number of goals scored.
(C) Champions; (R) Relegated

=== Positions by round ===
Team ╲ Round	1	2	3	4	5	6	7	8	9	10	11	12	13	14	15	16	17	18	19	20	21	22	23	24	25	26	27
HB	5	4	3	2	3	1	1	1	1	1	1	1	1	1	1	1	1	1	1	1	1	1	1	1	1	1	1
ÍF	3	2	1	3	4	4	5	4	4	3	3	2	2	2	2	2	2	2	2	2	2	2	2	2	2	2	2
B36 Tórshavn	5	3	5	5	5	5	6	5	7	7	8	6	6	4	4	4	5	5	5	5	4	4	4	5	4	3	3
NSÍ Runavík	7	8	8	8	6	6	4	6	5	4	4	5	3	5	5	5	6	6	6	6	6	5	5	3	3	4	4
EB/Streymur	1	5	6	7	9	8	9	8	6	5	5	3	4	3	3	3	3	3	3	3	3	3	3	4	5	6	5
Víkingur Gøta	3	7	4	4	1	3	2	3	3	6	6	8	8	8	8	7	4	4	4	4	5	6	6	6	6	5	6
AB	7	9	10	10	10	10	10	10	10	10	10	10	10	9	9	9	8	7	7	7	7	7	7	7	7	7	7
KÍ	2	1	2	1	2	2	3	2	2	2	2	4	5	6	6	6	7	8	8	8	8	8	8	8	8	8	8
TB	9	10	9	9	8	7	7	7	8	8	7	7	7	7	7	8	9	9	9	9	9	9	9	9	9	9	9
07 Vestur	10	6	7	6	7	9	8	9	9	9	9	9	9	10	10	10	10	10	10	10	10	10	10	10	10	10	10

Source: Faroe Soccer (in Faroese)

== Results ==
The schedule consisted of a total of 27 rounds. Each team played three games against every opponent in no particular order. At least one of the games had to be at home and at least one had to be away. The additional home game for every match-up was randomly assigned prior to the season, with the top five teams of the previous season having 5 home games.

=== Regular home games ===
Home \ Away	07V	AB	B36	EBS	HB	ÍF	KÍ	NSÍ	TB	VÍK
07 Vestur		1–1	0–3	0–2	1–2	1–3	2–1	1–1	4–1	0–1
Argja Bóltfelag	0–0		3–2	3–1	1–3	0–1	1–3	2–3	2–1	3–1
B36 Tórshavn	0–0	1–1		2–0	3–3	2–2	2–1	3–1	1–1	4–0
EB/Streymur	4–0	6–0	4–1		2–0	1–2	4–3	5–1	2–2	0–0
Havnar Bóltfelag	0–0	5–1	1–1	2–0		0–0	3–0	3–2	3–0	3–0
ÍF Fuglafjørður	3–1	2–1	1–3	2–2	0–2		3–3	3–3	4–3	2–1
KÍ Klaksvík	5–2	1–1	1–1	1–1	3–4	2–2		1–1	3–0	1–2
NSÍ Runavík	2–1	1–1	1–0	2–0	0–4	3–2	2–3		0–0	3–0
TB Tvøroyri	2–0	2–0	0–0	0–2	1–5	2–2	1–1	0–0		1–0
Víkingur Gøta	2–2	1–0	1–1	3–0	2–4	3–2	1–1	2–1	3–1	

Source: Soccerway
Legend: Blue = home team win; Yellow = draw; Red = away team win.

=== Additional home games ===
Home \ Away	07V	AB	B36	EBS	HB	ÍF	KÍ	NSÍ	TB	VÍK
07 Vestur		0–3	1–4					2–4	2–1	
Argja Bóltfelag				0–3	2–1		0–1	3–1		
B36 Tórshavn		2–1				1–2			2–1	3–2
EB/Streymur	4–0		1–2			5–0			3–1	0–2
Havnar Bóltfelag	6–0		2–2	4–0					1–0	1–3
ÍF Fuglafjørður	3–2	3–2			3–1		3–1	3–1		
KÍ Klaksvík	7–1		0–2	3–3	3–3				2–3	
NSÍ Runavík			4–0	1–0	4–2		4–3			
TB Tvøroyri		2–0				0–1		1–4		1–1
Víkingur Gøta	3–1	0–2				2–1	3–0	2–4		

Source: Soccerway
Legend: Blue = home team win; Yellow = draw; Red = away team win.

== Top goalscorers ==
Rank	Player	Club	Goals
1	(Faroe Islands) Klæmint Olsen	NSÍ	21
2	(Faroe Islands) Páll Klettskarð	KÍ	20
3	(Faroe Islands) Leif Niclasen	EB/Streymur	17
4	(Faroe Islands) Finnur Justinussen	Víkingur	16
5	(Brazil) Clayton Nascimento	ÍF	14
6	(Poland) Łukasz Cieślewicz	B36	12
6	(Faroe Islands) Øssur Dalbúð	ÍF	12
8	(Faroe Islands) Fróði Benjaminsen	HB	11
9	(Nigeria) Adeshina Lawal	B36	10

Source: Faroe Soccer

== Awards ==
Award	Winner	Team	Reference
Best Player	(Faroe Islands) Fróði Benjaminsen	HB	
Best Coach	(Faroe Islands) Albert Ellefsen	ÍF	
Best Goalkeeper	(Faroe Islands) Teitur Gestsson	HB	
Best Defender	(Faroe Islands) Jóhan Troest Davidsen	HB	
Best Midfielder	(Faroe Islands) Fróði Benjaminsen	HB	
Best Forward	(Faroe Islands) Páll Klettskarð	KÍ	
Best Young Player	(Faroe Islands) Hørður Askham	B36	
Best Referee	(Faroe Islands) Lars Müller	–	
Fair Play	07 Vestur		

=== Team of the season ===
- Goalkeeper: (Faroe Islands) Teitur Gestsson (HB)
- Defenders: (Faroe Islands) Bárður Hansen (Víkingur), (Faroe Islands) Jóhan Troest Davidsen (HB), (Faroe Islands) Høgni Zachariassen (ÍF), (Faroe Islands) Pól Jóhannus Justinussen (NSÍ).
- Midfielders: (Faroe Islands) Christian R. Mouritsen (HB), (Faroe Islands) Fróði Benjaminsen (HB), (Faroe Islands) Símun Samuelsen (HB).
- Forwards: (Faroe Islands) Páll Klettskarð (KÍ), (Faroe Islands) Klæmint A. Olsen (NSÍ), (Faroe Islands) Finnur Justinussen (Víkingur).

=== Goal of the Month ===
Month	Winner	Team
March	(Faroe Islands) Súni Olsen	B36
April	(Faroe Islands) Heðin Hansen	Víkingur
May	(Faroe Islands) Gunleif Olsen	07 Vestur
June	(Faroe Islands) Dion Splidt	AB
July/August	(Faroe Islands) Árni Frederiksberg	NSÍ
September	(Faroe Islands) Ragnar Tausen	TB
October	(Faroe Islands) Øssur Dalbúð	ÍF

=== Goal of the Year ===
Rank	Player	Team	Vote percentage
1st	Heðin Hansen	Víkingur	22%
2nd	Súni Olsen	B36	17%
3rd	Dion Splidt	AB	16%
4th	Ragnar Tausen	TB	16%
5th	Øssur Dalbúð	ÍF	12%
6th	Gunleif Olsen	07 Vestur	10%
7th	Árni Frederiksberg	NSÍ	7%

== See also ==
- 2013 Faroe Islands Cup
- 2013 Faroe Islands Super Cup
