= Meinhard Olsen =

Faroese footballer (born 1997)

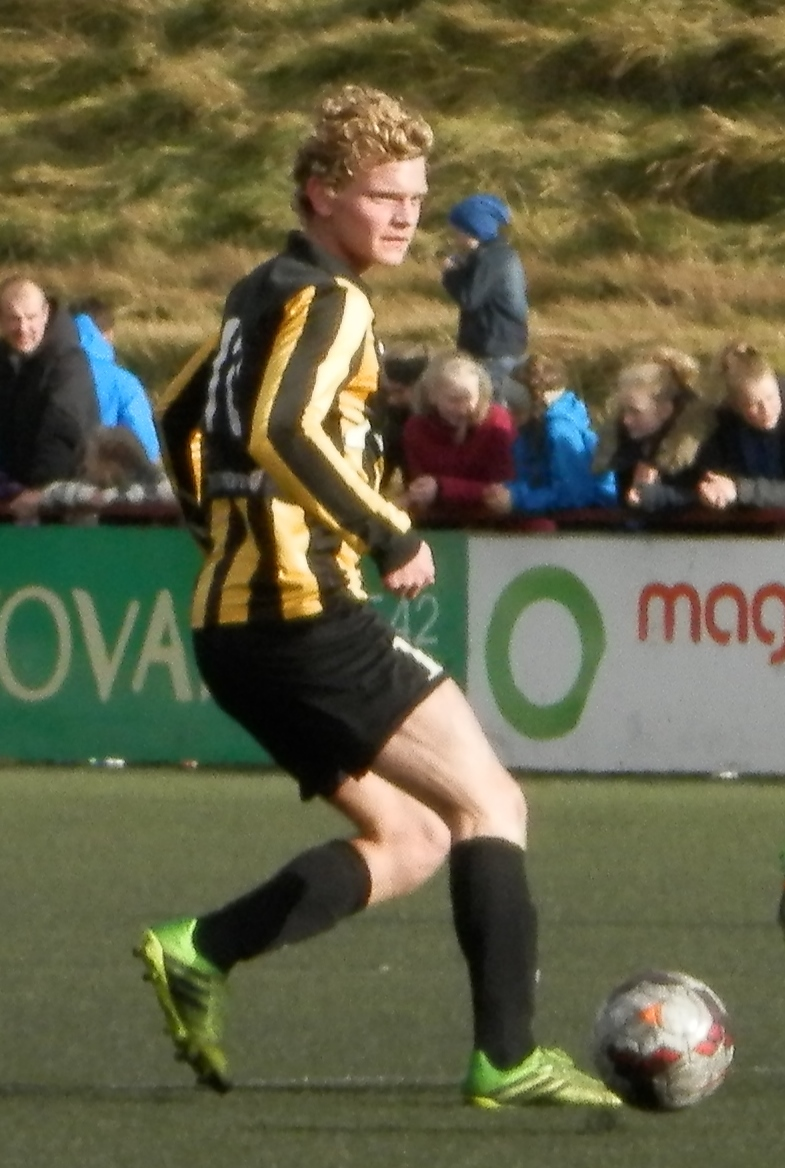
- Olsen with NSÍ Runavík in 2014

Personal information
- Full name: Meinhard Egilsson Olsen
- Date of birth: 10 April 1997 (age 29)
- Place of birth: Faroe Islands
- Position: Left winger

Team information
- Current team: NSÍ Runavík
- Number: 45

Youth career
- –2012: NSÍ Runavík

Senior career*
Years	Team	Apps	(Gls)
2013–2015	NSÍ Runavík	39	(1)
2015–2017	Vendsyssel	9	(1)
2017–2019	B36 Tórshavn	38	(17)
2019	Kristiansund	11	(1)
2020	B36 Tórshavn	16	(10)
2020	GAIS	15	(1)
2021	Bryne	25	(7)
2022–2024	Mjøndalen	63	(14)
2025–2026	Kolding	29	(4)
2026–	NSÍ Runavík	9	(1)

International career^{‡}
2011–2013	Faroe Islands U17	18	(2)
2014–2015	Faroe Islands U19	4	(0)
2015–2018	Faroe Islands U21	12	(4)
2019–	Faroe Islands	44	(1)
- * Club domestic league appearances and goals as of 17:28, 1 November 2026 (UTC) ‡ National team caps and goals as of 16 November 2026 (UTC)

Meinhard Egilsson Olsen (born 10 April 1997) is a Faroese professional footballer who plays as a left winger for Faroe Islands Premier League club NSÍ Runavík and the Faroe Islands national team.

== Club career ==
On 21 August 2020, Olsen joined Superettan team GAIS for the remainder of the 2020 season. He left at the end of the season. Olsen moved to Bryne FK for a year, prior to signing for Mjøndalen IF. The move was confirmed on August 5, 2021, but Olsen only joined the club from January 2022.

Olsen played for Mjøndalen IF for two years before it was confirmed in December 2024 that he would leave the club at the end of the year when his contract expired. Later that month, it was also revealed that Olsen had been named Mjøndalen 2024 Player of the Year by the newspaper Drammens Tidende, scoring seven goals and two assists in 27 league games.

On 19 January 2025, it was confirmed that Olsen returned to Denmark, where he had signed with Danish 1st Division club Kolding IF.

== International career ==
He made his Faroe Islands national football team debut on 7 June 2019 in a Euro 2020 qualifier against Spain, as an 86th-minute substitute for Árni Frederiksberg. He scored his first goal for the Faroe Islands national team on 25 March 2021 in a 1–1 draw in the 2022 FIFA World Cup qualification against Moldova.

== Career statistics ==
=== Club ===
As of match played 29 August 2022

Appearances and goals by club, season and competition
Club	Season	League			National cup (Note: Includes Faroe Islands Cup, Danish Cup, Norwegian Cup, Svenska Cupen)		Europe		Total	
Club	Season	Division	Apps	Goals	Apps	Goals	Apps	Goals	Apps	Goals
NSÍ	2013	Faroe Islands Premier League	5	0	1	0	—		6	0
NSÍ	2014	Faroe Islands Premier League	22	0	2	0	—		24	9
NSÍ	2015	Faroe Islands Premier League	12	1	2	0	1 (Note: Appearance(s) in UEFA Europa League)	0	15	1
NSÍ	Total		39	1	5	0	1	0	45	1
Vendsyssel	2015–16	Danish 1st Division	1	1	0	0	—		1	1
Vendsyssel	2016–17	Danish 1st Division	8	0	2	1	—		10	1
Vendsyssel	Total		9	1	2	1	—		11	2
B36 Tórshavn	2017	Faroe Islands Premier League	13	4	1	0	—		14	4
B36 Tórshavn	2018	Faroe Islands Premier League	25	13	5	0	6	0	36	13
B36 Tórshavn	Total		38	17	6	0	6	0	50	17
Kristiansund	2019	Eliteserien	11	1	3	1	—		14	2
B36 Tórshavn	2020	Faroe Islands Premier League	16	10	0	0	1	0	17	10
GAIS	2020	Superettan	15	1	0	0	—		15	1
Bryne	2021	Norwegian First Division	25	7	1	0	—		26	7
Mjøndalen	2022	Norwegian First Division	22	6	1	0	—		23	6
Career total			175	44	18	2	8	0	201	46

=== International ===
Scores and results list Faroe Islands' goal tally first, score column indicates score after each Olsen goal.

List of international goals scored by Meinhard Olsen
No.	Date	Venue	Opponent	Score	Result	Competition
1	25 March 2021	Stadionul Zimbru, Chișinău, Moldova	Moldova	1–1	1–1	2022 FIFA World Cup qualification UEFA Group F

== Honours ==
NSÍ Runavík

- Faroe Islands Premier League: 2026
