= 2014 Faroe Islands Premier League =

Faroe Islands Premier League
- Season: 2014
- Champions: B36 (10th title)
- Relegated: B68; Skála
- Champions League: B36
- Europa League: Víkingur (via Faroe Islands Cup); HB; NSÍ
- Matches: 135
- Goals: 415 (3.07 per match)
- Top goalscorer: Klæmint Olsen (22 goals)
- Biggest home win: HB 6–0 B68 (R16)
- Biggest away win: AB 0–7 NSÍ (R10)
- Highest scoring: B68 5–3 KÍ (R9)

2014 Faroe Islands Premier League was the seventy-second season of top-tier football on the Faroe Islands. For sponsorship reasons, it was known as Effodeildin. Havnar Bóltfelag were the defending champions.

== Teams ==
Location of teams in Effodeildin 2014

TB and 07 Vestur had finished 9th and 10th respectively at the end of the previous season and were relegated to the 1. deild as a result.

Replacing them were the 1. deild champions B68 and runners-up Skála.

=== Teams summaries ===
Team	Location	Stadium	Capacity	Manager	Kit manufacturer	Shirt sponsor
AB	Argir	Blue Water Arena	2,000	(Faroe Islands) Oddbjørn Joensen	Adidas	Install
B36	Tórshavn	Gundadalur	5,000	(Faroe Islands) Sámal Erik Hentze	Adidas	P/F Wenzel
B68	Toftir	Svangaskarð	6,000	(Faroe Islands) Øssur Hansen	Nike	None
EB/Streymur	Streymnes	Við Margáir	1,000	(Faroe Islands) Rúni Nolsøe	Nike	(Note: Thor, Atlanticpane, Bátafiskur, Norðsetur and Vermland are the sponsors of EB/Streymur, each player wears a shirt with one of these five different sponsors.)
HB	Tórshavn	Gundadalur	5,000	(Faroe Islands) Heðin Askham	Nike	Auto Service
ÍF	Fuglafjørður	Í Fløtugerði	3,000	(Faroe Islands) Albert Ellefsen	Puma	Bank Nordik
KÍ	Klaksvík	Við Djúpumýrar	3,000	(Faroe Islands) Eyðun Klakstein	Adidas	JFK
NSÍ	Runavík	Við Løkin	2,000	(Faroe Islands) Trygvi Mortensen	Nike	Bakkafrost
Skála	Skála	Undir Mýruhjalla	2,000	(Faroe Islands) Pauli Poulsen	Stanno	R Transport (Note: Only some players use shirt with sponsor.)
Víkingur	Norðragøta	Sarpugerði	3,000	(Faroe Islands) Sigfríður Clementsen	Adidas	Vodafone

=== Managerial changes ===
Team	Outgoing manager	Manner of departure	Date of vacancy	Position in table	Incoming manager	Date of appointment
B36	(Faroe Islands) Mikkjal Thomassen		26 October 2013	Pre-season	(Faroe Islands) Sámal Erik Hentze	26 October 2013
HB	(Faroe Islands) Oddbjørn Joensen		29 October 2013	Pre-season	(Faroe Islands) Heðin Askham	29 October 2013
AB	(Faroe Islands) Sámal Erik Hentze	Signed by B36	26 October 2013	Pre-season	(Faroe Islands) Bill McLeod Jacobsen	5 November 2013
NSÍ	(Faroe Islands) Heðin Askham	Signed by HB	29 October 2013	Pre-season	(Faroe Islands) Trygvi Mortensen	7 November 2013
AB	(Faroe Islands) Bill McLeod Jacobsen	Personal reasons	16 April 2014	7th	(Faroe Islands) Oddbjørn Joensen	16 April 2014
Skála	(Faroe Islands) Eliesar Olsen	Resigned	16 June 2014	10th	(Faroe Islands) Pauli Poulsen	17 June 2014

== League table ==
Pos	Team	Pld	W	D	L	GF	GA	GD	Pts	Qualification or relegation
1	B36 Tórshavn (C)	27	19	4	4	53	25	+28	61	Qualification for the Champions League first qualifying round
2	HB	27	18	6	3	59	20	+39	60	Qualification for the Europa League first qualifying round (Note: Víkingur qualified for 2015–16 UEFA Europa League first qualifying round by winning the 2014 Faroe Islands Cup.)
3	Víkingur Gøta	27	13	10	4	60	30	+30	49	Qualification for the Europa League first qualifying round
4	NSÍ Runavík	27	12	4	11	53	42	+11	40	Qualification for the Europa League first qualifying round
5	EB/Streymur	27	11	7	9	41	33	+8	40	
6	KÍ	27	10	6	11	41	38	+3	36	
7	ÍF	27	7	7	13	36	52	−16	28	
8	AB	27	6	7	14	30	61	−31	25	
9	Skála ÍF (R)	27	3	8	16	19	54	−35	17	Relegation to 1. deild
10	B68 Toftir (R)	27	4	5	18	23	60	−37	17	Relegation to 1. deild

Source: Faroe Soccer
Rules for classification: 1) points; 2) goal difference; 3) number of goals scored.
(C) Champions; (R) Relegated

=== Positions by round ===
Team ╲ Round	1	2	3	4	5	6	7	8	9	10	11	12	13	14	15	16	17	18	19	20	21	22	23	24	25	26	27
AB	2	5	7	7	8	8	9	10	9	9	9	9	9	8	8	8	8	8	8	8	8	8	8	8	8	8	8
B36 Tórshavn	2	2	3	4	2	1	1	1	1	1	1	1	1	1	1	1	1	1	1	1	1	1	1	1	1	1	1
B68 Toftir	7	7	9	9	10	9	8	8	8	8	8	8	8	9	9	10	10	10	10	10	10	9	9	9	9	9	10
EB/Streymur	5	6	5	2	6	5	6	4	5	4	4	4	5	6	4	4	4	4	4	4	4	4	4	5	5	5	5
HB	5	4	2	3	1	2	2	2	2	2	2	2	2	2	2	2	2	2	2	2	2	2	2	2	2	2	2
ÍF	8	9	6	5	4	6	5	6	7	7	6	7	7	7	7	7	7	7	7	7	7	7	7	7	7	7	7
KÍ	1	2	4	6	5	3	3	3	4	6	7	6	6	5	6	6	6	6	6	6	6	6	6	6	6	6	6
NSÍ Runavík	4	1	1	1	3	4	4	5	6	3	3	3	4	4	5	5	5	5	5	5	5	5	5	4	4	4	4
Skála ÍF	10	10	10	10	9	10	10	9	10	10	10	10	10	10	10	9	9	9	9	9	9	10	10	10	10	10	9
Víkingur Gøta	10	8	8	8	7	7	7	7	3	5	5	5	3	3	3	3	3	3	3	3	3	3	3	3	3	3	3

Updated to match(es) played on 25 October 2014. Source: Faroe Soccer

== Results ==
The schedule consists of a total of 27 rounds. Each team plays three games against every opponent in no particular order. At least one of the games had to be at home and at least one had to be away. The additional home game for every match-up was randomly assigned prior to the season, with the top five teams of the previous season having 5 home games.

=== Regular home games ===
Home \ Away	AB	B36	B68	EBS	HB	ÍF	KÍ	NSÍ	SKÁ	VÍK
Argja Bóltfelag		1–2	3–2	2–2	0–3	2–0	1–1	0–7	1–1	0–3
B36 Tórshavn	1–1		3–0	3–1	1–1	1–0	2–1	1–0	2–0	2–2
B68 Toftir	3–2	2–4		1–1	0–4	1–1	5–3	0–2	0–0	1–3
EB/Streymur	5–0	1–0	3–0		1–1	1–2	3–1	0–0	3–0	2–3
Havnar Bóltfelag	1–2	2–2	6–0	1–2		3–1	2–0	4–1	2–0	2–2
ÍF Fuglafjørður	1–4	2–5	3–0	3–0	2–2		1–3	2–1	1–0	2–2
KÍ Klaksvík	4–1	1–3	0–0	3–1	1–2	4–0		2–2	1–0	1–0
NSÍ Runavík	3–0	0–1	1–0	1–2	1–2	2–2	1–1		6–1	0–2
Skála ÍF	0–0	0–3	1–0	1–1	0–1	2–2	2–0	1–5		1–1
Víkingur Gøta	0–2	1–2	1–0	1–1	0–0	1–1	1–1	3–0	5–0	

Source: Faroe Soccer
Legend: Blue = home team win; Yellow = draw; Red = away team win.

=== Additional home games ===
Home \ Away	AB	B36	B68	EBS	HB	ÍF	KÍ	NSÍ	SKÁ	VÍK
Argja Bóltfelag		0–3		0–0	1–3				1–2	
B36 Tórshavn				1–0	1–2		0–1		2–0	0–2
B68 Toftir	1–2	1–3		0–3			1–0			
EB/Streymur					0–3		2–0	0–2	3–1	1–3
Havnar Bóltfelag			3–0			2–0		3–0	2–0	2–1
ÍF Fuglafjørður	3–0	1–2	1–2	0–2			1–1			
KÍ Klaksvík	5–1				1–0				3–0	2–4
NSÍ Runavík	3–1	2–3	3–1			4–2	2–0			
Skála ÍF			1–1			0–2		2–3		3–3
Víkingur Gøta	2–2		3–1			5–0		6–1		

Source: Faroe Soccer
Legend: Blue = home team win; Yellow = draw; Red = away team win.

== Top goalscorers ==
As of 25 October.

Rank	Player	Club	Goals (Pen.)
1	(Faroe Islands) Klæmint Olsen	NSÍ	22 (2)
2	(Faroe Islands) Finnur Justinussen	Víkingur	19
3	(Nigeria) Adeshina Lawal	B36	13 (1)
3	(Faroe Islands) Hans Pauli Samuelsen	EB/Streymur	13 (5)
5	(Faroe Islands) Páll Klettskarð	KÍ	12 (1)
5	(Faroe Islands) Fróði Benjaminsen	HB	12 (1)
7	(Faroe Islands) Andrew av Fløtum	HB	10
7	(Faroe Islands) Arnbjørn Hansen	EB/Streymur	10
7	(Faroe Islands) Árni Frederiksberg	NSÍ	10
7	(Faroe Islands) Súni Olsen	Víkingur	10 (3)

=== Hat-tricks ===
Player	For	Against	Result	Date
(Faroe Islands) Klæmint Olsen	NSÍ	Skála	1–5	23 March 2014
(Faroe Islands) Arnbjørn Hansen	EB/Streymur	AB	5–0	11 May 2014
(Faroe Islands) Sorin Anghel	AB	ÍF	1–4	18 May 2014
(Faroe Islands) Klæmint Olsen^{1}	NSÍ	AB	0–7	25 May 2014
(Faroe Islands) Árni Frederiksberg	NSÍ	Skála	6–1	1 June 2014
(Faroe Islands) Klæmint Olsen	NSÍ	AB	3–1	14 September 2014
(Faroe Islands) Páll Klettskarð	KÍ	Skála	3–0	1 October 2014
(Faroe Islands) Andrew av Fløtum	HB	AB	1–3	5 October 2014
(Faroe Islands) Hallur Hansson	Víkingur	ÍF	5–0	5 October 2014

- ^{1} Scored four goals.

== Awards ==
=== Season awards ===
Award	Winner	Team	Reference
Best Player	(Nigeria) Adeshina Lawal	B36	
Best Coach	(Faroe Islands) Sámal Erik Hentze	B36	
Best Goalkeeper	(Faroe Islands) Teitur Gestsson	HB	
Best Defender	(Faroe Islands) Jóhan Troest Davidsen	HB	
Best Midfielder	(Poland) Łukasz Cieślewicz	B36	
Best Forward	(Nigeria) Adeshina Lawal	B36	
Best Young Player	(Faroe Islands) Bárður Hansen	Víkingur	
Best Referee	(Faroe Islands) Lars Müller	–	
Fair Play	B36		

=== Team of the Season ===
- Goalkeeper: (Faroe Islands) Teitur M. Gestsson (HB)
- Defenders: (Faroe Islands) Bárður Hansen (Víkingur), (Faroe Islands) Jóhan T. Davidsen (HB), (Faroe Islands) Hørður Askham (B36), (Faroe Islands) Alex Mellemgaard (B36).
- Midfielders: (Faroe Islands) Árni Frederiksberg (NSÍ), (Faroe Islands) Hallur Hansson (Víkingur), (Poland) Łukasz Cieślewicz (B36), (Faroe Islands) Hans Pauli Samuelsen (EB/Streymur).
- Forwards: (Faroe Islands) Klæmint Olsen, (Nigeria) Adeshina Lawal (B36).

=== Goal of the Month ===
Month	Winner	Team
March	(Faroe Islands) Róaldur Jakobsen	B36
April	(Faroe Islands) Jákup á Borg	B36
May	(Faroe Islands) Fróði Benjaminsen	HB
June/July	(Faroe Islands) Niels Pauli Danielsen	EB/Streymur
August	(Brazil) Clayton Soares	ÍF
September/October	(Faroe Islands) Jóhan Dávur Højgaard	B68

=== Goal of the Year ===
Rank	Player	Team	Vote percentage
1	Jóhan Dávur Højgaard	B68	27%
2	Niels Pauli Danielsen	EB/Streymur	24%
3	Róaldur Jakobsen	B36	21%
4	Fróði Benjaminsen	HB	14%
5	Jákup á Borg	B36	7%
6	Clayton Soares	ÍF	7%

== See also ==
- 2014 Faroe Islands Cup
- Faroe Islands Super Cup
