= Troest =

Troest is a Danish surname. Notable people with the surname include:

- Jóhan Troest Davidsen (born 1988), Faroese footballer
- Jonas Troest (born 1985), Danish footballer
- Magnus Troest (born 1987), Danish footballer
- Stina Troest (born 1994), Danish hurdler
