= Trygvi Askham =

Faroese footballer

Personal information
- Full name: Trygvi Askham
- Date of birth: 28 March 1988 (age 38)
- Place of birth: Faroe Islands
- Height: 1.88 m (6 ft 2 in)
- Position: Goalkeeper

Team information
- Current team: B36 Tórshavn
- Number: 25

Senior career*
Years	Team	Apps	(Gls)
2005–2009	FS Vágar/07 Vestur	108	(0)
2007	FS Vágar II	3	(0)
2010	FC Hoyvík	14	(0)
2011–2013	IF Føroyar		
2013–	B36 Tórshavn	32	(0)
2013–	B36 Tórshavn II	30	(0)
2013–2015	B36 Tórshavn III	5	(0)
2017	→ EB/Streymur (loan)	21	(0)

International career^{‡}
2005–2006	Faroe Islands U19	6	(0)
2009	Faroe Islands U21	1	(0)
2018–	Faroe Islands	1	(0)
- * Club domestic league appearances and goals as of 04:57, 18 April 2020 (UTC) ‡ National team caps and goals as of 04:57, 18 April 2020 (UTC)

Trygvi Askham (born 28 March 1988) is a Faroese retired footballer who played as a goalkeeper for B36 Tórshavn and the Faroe Islands national team.

== Career ==
Askham made his international debut for the Faroe Islands on 22 March 2018 in a friendly against Latvia. He came on as a half-time substitute for Teitur Gestsson, with the match in Marbella finishing as a 1–1 draw.

== Career statistics ==
=== International ===
As of 22 March 2018

Faroe Islands
Year	Apps	Goals
2018	1	0
Total	1	0
