= Jákup Thomsen =

Faroese footballer (born 1997)

Personal information
- Full name: Jákup Ludvig Thomsen
- Date of birth: 23 November 1997 (age 28)
- Place of birth: Faroe Islands
- Height: 1.83 m (6 ft 0 in)
- Position: Centre-forward

Team information
- Current team: HB Tórshavn
- Number: 23

Youth career
- –2013: HB
- 2013–2016: Midtjylland

Senior career*
Years	Team	Apps	(Gls)
2016–2020	Midtjylland	0	(0)
2016–2017	→ Ikast FS (loan)	0	(0)
2017	→ Skive (loan)	4	(0)
2017	→ Thisted (loan)	7	(0)
2018	→ Thisted (loan)	12	(1)
2018	→ FH (loan)	9	(3)
2019	→ FH (loan)	11	(1)
2020-	HB Tórshavn	98	(30)

International career^{‡}
2013	Faroe Islands U17	10	(0)
2014–2015	Faroe Islands U19	4	(0)
2015–2018	Faroe Islands U21	17	(2)
2018–	Faroe Islands	3	(1)
- * Club domestic league appearances and goals as of 1 November 2026 ‡ National team caps and goals as of 02:45, 24 March 2019 (UTC)

Jákup Ludvig Thomsen (born 23 November 1997) is a Faroese footballer who plays as a centre-forward for HB Tórshavn.

== International career ==
Thomsen made his international debut for the Faroe Islands on 17 November 2018, coming on as a substitute in the 63rd minute for Klæmint Olsen in the 2018–19 UEFA Nations League D match against Azerbaijan, which finished as a 0–2 away loss. He scored his first goal for the national team on 23 March 2019 in a 1–2 away loss to Malta in the UEFA Euro 2020 qualifying.

== Career statistics ==
=== International ===
As of 23 March 2019

Faroe Islands
Year	Apps	Goals
2018	2	0
2019	1	1
Total	3	1

=== International goals ===
No.	Date	Venue	Opponent	Score	Result	Competition
1	23 March 2019	National Stadium, Ta' Qali, Malta	Malta	1–2	1–2	UEFA Euro 2020 qualifying
