= 2014 FIFA World Cup qualification – UEFA Group C =

Football tournament qualifying stage

The 2014 FIFA World Cup qualification UEFA Group C was a UEFA qualifying group for the 2014 FIFA World Cup. The group comprised Germany, Sweden, Republic of Ireland, Austria, Faroe Islands and Kazakhstan.

The group winners, Germany, qualified directly for the 2014 FIFA World Cup. Sweden placed among the eight best runners-up and advanced to the play-offs, where they were drawn to play home-and-away matches against Portugal. However, they lost both matches and thus failed to qualify for the World Cup. Germany went on to win the tournament, defeating Argentina in the final.

== Standings ==
Pos	Team	Pld	W	D	L	GF	GA	GD	Pts	Qualification	Germany national football team	Sweden men's national football team	Austria national football team	Republic of Ireland national football team	Kazakhstan national football team	Faroe Islands national football team
1	Germany	10	9	1	0	36	10	+26	28	Qualification to 2014 FIFA World Cup	—	4–4	3–0	3–0	4–1	3–0
2	Sweden	10	6	2	2	19	14	+5	20	Advance to second round	3–5	—	2–1	0–0	2–0	2–0
3	Austria	10	5	2	3	20	10	+10	17		1–2	2–1	—	1–0	4–0	6–0
4	Republic of Ireland	10	4	2	4	16	17	−1	14		1–6	1–2	2–2	—	3–1	3–0
5	Kazakhstan	10	1	2	7	6	21	−15	5		0–3	0–1	0–0	1–2	—	2–1
6	Faroe Islands	10	0	1	9	4	29	−25	1		0–3	1–2	0–3	1–4	1–1	—

== Matches ==
The dates for fixtures were decided at a meeting held in Frankfurt, Germany, on 17–18 November 2011. The dates were not ratified by FIFA and a new schedule was announced on 5 December 2011 with new dates for the two matches between Austria and the Faroe Islands.

7 September 2012
22:00 UTC+6

Kazakhstan	1–2	Republic of Ireland
Nurdauletov 37'	Report	Keane 88' (pen.); Doyle 90'

Astana Arena, Astana
Attendance: 12,384
Referee: Ionut Avram (Romania)
7 September 2012
20:45 UTC+2

Germany	3–0	Faroe Islands
Götze 28'; Özil 54', 72'	Report

AWD-Arena, Hanover
Attendance: 32,769
Referee: Robert Madden (Scotland)

11 September 2012
20:30 UTC+2

Sweden	2–0	Kazakhstan
R. Elm 37'; Berg 90+4'	Report

Swedbank Stadion, Malmö
Attendance: 20,414
Referee: Serhiy Boiko (Ukraine)
11 September 2012
20:35 UTC+2

Austria	1–2	Germany
Junuzović 57'	Report	Reus 44'; Özil 52' (pen.)

Ernst-Happel-Stadion, Vienna
Attendance: 47,000
Referee: Björn Kuipers (Netherlands)

12 October 2012
22:00 UTC+6

Kazakhstan	0–0	Austria
	Report

Astana Arena, Astana
Attendance: 12,900
Referee: Tamás Bognar (Hungary)
12 October 2012
17:00 UTC+1

Faroe Islands	1–2	Sweden
Baldvinsson 57'	Report	Kačaniklić 65'; Ibrahimović 75'

Tórsvøllur, Tórshavn
Attendance: 5,079
Referee: Anastasios Sidiropoulos (Greece)
12 October 2012
19:45 UTC+1

Republic of Ireland	1–6	Germany
Keogh 90+2'	Report	Reus 32', 40'; Özil 55' (pen.); Klose 58'; Kroos 61', 83'

Aviva Stadium, Dublin
Attendance: 49,850
Referee: Nicola Rizzoli (Italy)

16 October 2012
19:00 UTC+1

Faroe Islands	1–4	Republic of Ireland
A. Hansen 69'	Report	Wilson 46'; Walters 53'; Justinussen 73' (o.g.); O'Dea 88'

Tórsvøllur, Tórshavn
Attendance: 4,300
Referee: Lorenc Jemini (Albania)
16 October 2012
20:35 UTC+2

Austria	4–0	Kazakhstan
Janko 24', 63'; Alaba 71'; Harnik 90+3'	Report

Ernst-Happel-Stadion, Vienna
Attendance: 43,000
Referee: Jakob Kehlet (Denmark)
16 October 2012
20:45 UTC+2

Germany	4–4	Sweden
Klose 8', 15'; Mertesacker 39'; Özil 55'	Report	Ibrahimović 62'; Lustig 64'; Elmander 76'; R. Elm 90+3'

Olympiastadion, Berlin
Attendance: 72,369
Referee: Pedro Proença (Portugal)

22 March 2013
23:59 UTC+6

Kazakhstan	0–3	Germany
	Report	Müller 20', 73'; Götze 22'

Astana Arena, Astana
Attendance: 29,300
Referee: Anastassios Kakos (Greece)
22 March 2013
20:30 UTC+1

Austria	6–0	Faroe Islands
Hosiner 8', 20'; Ivanschitz 28'; Junuzović 77'; Alaba 78'; Garics 82'	Report

Ernst-Happel-Stadion, Vienna
Attendance: 24,200
Referee: Oleksandr Derdo (Ukraine)
22 March 2013
20:45 UTC+1

Sweden	0–0	Republic of Ireland
	Report

Friends Arena, Solna
Attendance: 49,436
Referee: Alberto Undiano Mallenco (Spain)

26 March 2013
20:45 UTC+1

Germany	4–1	Kazakhstan
Reus 23', 90'; Götze 27'; Gündoğan 31'	Report	Schmidtgal 46'

Frankenstadion, Nuremberg
Attendance: 43,520
Referee: Halis Özkahya (Turkey)
26 March 2013
19:45 UTC±0

Republic of Ireland	2–2	Austria
Walters 25' (pen.), 45+1'	Report	Harnik 11'; Alaba 90+3'

Aviva Stadium, Dublin
Attendance: 35,100
Referee: Marijo Strahonja (Croatia)

7 June 2013
20:45 UTC+2

Austria	2–1	Sweden
Alaba 26' (pen.); Janko 32'	Report	Elmander 82'

Ernst-Happel-Stadion, Vienna
Attendance: 48,500
Referee: Gianluca Rocchi (Italy)
7 June 2013
19:45 UTC+1

Republic of Ireland	3–0	Faroe Islands
Keane 5', 55', 81'	Report

Aviva Stadium, Dublin
Attendance: 30,805
Referee: Mattias Gestranius (Finland)

11 June 2013
19:15 UTC+2

Sweden	2–0	Faroe Islands
Ibrahimović 35', 82' (pen.)	Report

Friends Arena, Solna
Attendance: 32,858
Referee: Nikolay Yordanov (Bulgaria)

6 September 2013
21:00 UTC+6

Kazakhstan	2–1	Faroe Islands
Nurdauletov 49' (pen.); Finonchenko 63'	Report	Benjaminsen 23'

Astana Arena, Astana
Attendance: 9,000
Referee: Johnny Casanova (San Marino)
6 September 2013
20:45 UTC+2

Germany	3–0	Austria
Klose 33'; Kroos 51'; Müller 88'	Report

Allianz Arena, Munich
Attendance: 68,000
Referee: Milorad Mažić (Serbia)
6 September 2013
19:45 UTC+1

Republic of Ireland	1–2	Sweden
Keane 22'	Report	Elmander 33'; Svensson 57'

Aviva Stadium, Dublin
Attendance: 50,000
Referee: Damir Skomina (Slovenia)

10 September 2013
22:00 UTC+6

Kazakhstan	0–1	Sweden
	Report	Ibrahimović 1'

Astana Arena, Astana
Attendance: 24,000
Referee: Miroslav Zelinka (Czech Republic)
10 September 2013
20:45 UTC+2

Austria	1–0	Republic of Ireland
Alaba 84'	Report

Ernst-Happel-Stadion, Vienna
Attendance: 48,500
Referee: Olegário Benquerença (Portugal)
10 September 2013
19:45 UTC+1

Faroe Islands	0–3	Germany
	Report	Mertesacker 22'; Özil 74' (pen.); Müller 84'

Tórsvøllur, Tórshavn
Attendance: 4,118
Referee: Gediminas Mažeika (Lithuania)

11 October 2013
18:00 UTC+1

Faroe Islands	1–1	Kazakhstan
Hansson 41'	Report	Finonchenko 55'

Tórsvøllur, Tórshavn
Attendance: 1,870
Referee: Dumitru Muntean (Moldova)
11 October 2013
20:45 UTC+2

Germany	3–0	Republic of Ireland
Khedira 11'; Schürrle 58'; Özil 90+1'	Report

RheinEnergieStadion, Cologne
Attendance: 46,237
Referee: Serge Gumienny (Belgium)
11 October 2013
20:45 UTC+2

Sweden	2–1	Austria
Olsson 56'; Ibrahimović 86'	Report	Harnik 29'

Friends Arena, Solna
Attendance: 49,416
Referee: Cüneyt Çakır (Turkey)

15 October 2013
20:45 UTC+2

Sweden	3–5	Germany
Hysén 6', 69'; Kačaniklić 42'	Report	Özil 45'; Götze 52'; Schürrle 57', 66', 76'

Friends Arena, Solna
Attendance: 49,251
Referee: William Collum (Scotland)
15 October 2013
19:45 UTC+1

Faroe Islands	0–3	Austria
	Report	Ivanschitz 16'; Prödl 64'; Alaba 67' (pen.)

Tórsvøllur, Tórshavn
Attendance: 3,100
Referee: Liran Liany (Israel)
15 October 2013
19:45 UTC+1

Republic of Ireland	3–1	Kazakhstan
Keane 17' (pen.); O'Shea 26'; Shomko 77' (o.g.)	Report	Shomko 13'

Aviva Stadium, Dublin
Attendance: 21,700
Referee: Vadims Direktorenko (Latvia)

== Goalscorers ==
There were 101 goals scored in 30 matches, for an average of 3.37 goals per match.

8 goals

- (Germany) Mesut Özil

6 goals

- (Austria) David Alaba
- (Republic of Ireland) Robbie Keane
- (Sweden) Zlatan Ibrahimović

5 goals

- (Germany) Marco Reus

4 goals

- (Germany) Mario Götze
- (Germany) Miroslav Klose
- (Germany) Thomas Müller
- (Germany) André Schürrle

3 goals

- (Austria) Martin Harnik
- (Austria) Marc Janko
- (Germany) Toni Kroos
- (Republic of Ireland) Jonathan Walters
- (Sweden) Johan Elmander

2 goals

- (Austria) Philipp Hosiner
- (Austria) Andreas Ivanschitz
- (Austria) Zlatko Junuzović
- (Germany) Per Mertesacker
- (Kazakhstan) Andrei Finonchenko
- (Kazakhstan) Kairat Nurdauletov
- (Sweden) Rasmus Elm
- (Sweden) Tobias Hysén
- (Sweden) Alexander Kačaniklić

1 goal

- (Austria) György Garics
- (Austria) Sebastian Prödl
- (Faroe Islands) Rógvi Baldvinsson
- (Faroe Islands) Fróði Benjaminsen
- (Faroe Islands) Arnbjørn Hansen
- (Faroe Islands) Hallur Hansson
- (Germany) İlkay Gündoğan
- (Germany) Sami Khedira
- (Kazakhstan) Heinrich Schmidtgal
- (Kazakhstan) Dmitriy Shomko
- (Republic of Ireland) Kevin Doyle
- (Republic of Ireland) Andy Keogh
- (Republic of Ireland) Darren O'Dea
- (Republic of Ireland) John O'Shea
- (Republic of Ireland) Marc Wilson
- (Sweden) Marcus Berg
- (Sweden) Mikael Lustig
- (Sweden) Martin Olsson
- (Sweden) Anders Svensson

1 own goal

- (Faroe Islands) Pól Jóhannus Justinussen (against the Republic of Ireland)
- (Kazakhstan) Dmitriy Shomko (against the Republic of Ireland)

== Discipline ==
Pos	Player	Country	Booked	Sent off (straight red)	Suspended for match(es)	Reason
DF	Philipp Lahm	Germany	2	0	vs Republic of Ireland (12 October 2012)	Booked in two 2014 World Cup qualifying matches
MF	Tanat Nusserbayev	Kazakhstan	2	0	vs Austria (16 October 2012)	Booked in two 2014 World Cup qualifying matches
FW	Sergei Ostapenko	Kazakhstan	2	0	vs Austria (16 October 2012)	Booked in two 2014 World Cup qualifying matches
DF	Mikhail Rozhkov	Kazakhstan	2	0	vs Austria (16 October 2012)	Booked in two 2014 World Cup qualifying matches
FW	Marco Reus	Germany	3	0	vs Kazakhstan (22 March 2013)	Booked in two 2014 World Cup qualifying matches
MF	Bastian Schweinsteiger	Germany	2	0	vs Kazakhstan (26 March 2013)	Booked in two 2014 World Cup qualifying matches
MF	Fróði Benjaminsen	Faroe Islands	4	0	vs Republic of Ireland (7 June 2013)	Booked in two 2014 World Cup qualifying matches
MF	Hallur Hansson	Faroe Islands	3	0	vs Republic of Ireland (7 June 2013)	Booked in two 2014 World Cup qualifying matches
FW	Shane Long	Republic of Ireland	2	0	vs Faroe Islands (7 June 2013)	Booked in two 2014 World Cup qualifying matches
FW	James McCarthy	Republic of Ireland	2	0	vs Faroe Islands (7 June 2013)	Booked in two 2014 World Cup qualifying matches
MF	Veli Kavlak	Austria	3	0	vs Sweden (7 June 2013)	Booked in two 2014 World Cup qualifying matches
GK	Andreas Isaksson	Sweden	2	0	vs Faroe Islands (11 June 2013)	Booked in two 2014 World Cup qualifying matches
FW	Johan Elmander	Sweden	2	0	vs Faroe Islands (11 June 2013)	Booked in two 2014 World Cup qualifying matches
DF	Rogvi Baldvinsson	Faroe Islands	2	0	vs Sweden (11 June 2013)	Booked in two 2014 World Cup qualifying matches
MF	Julian Baumgartlinger	Austria	2	0	vs Germany (6 September 2013)	Booked in two 2014 World Cup qualifying matches
DF	Jónas Tór Næs	Faroe Islands	2	0	vs Germany (10 September 2013)	Booked in two 2014 World Cup qualifying matches
DF	Andreas Granqvist	Sweden	0	1	vs Republic of Ireland (6 September 2013)	Sent off in a 2014 World Cup qualifying match
MF	Albin Ekdal	Sweden	2	0	vs Austria (11 October 2013)	Booked in two 2014 World Cup qualifying matches
DF	Viktor Dmitrenko	Kazakhstan	2	0	vs Faroe Islands (11 October 2013)	Booked in two 2014 World Cup qualifying matches
DF	John O'Shea	Republic of Ireland	2	0	vs Germany (11 October 2013)	Booked in two 2014 World Cup qualifying matches
DF	Richard Dunne	Republic of Ireland	2	0	vs Germany (11 October 2013)	Booked in two 2014 World Cup qualifying matches
DF	Pól Jóhannus Justinussen	Faroe Islands	2	0	vs Kazakhstan (11 October 2013)	Booked in two 2014 World Cup qualifying matches
DF	Atli Gregersen	Faroe Islands	0	1	vs Kazakhstan (11 October 2013)	Sent off in a 2014 World Cup qualifying match
MF	Sami Khedira	Germany	2	0	vs Sweden (15 October 2013)	Booked in two 2014 World Cup qualifying matches
FW	Zlatan Ibrahimović	Sweden	2	0	vs Germany (15 October 2013)	Booked in two 2014 World Cup qualifying matches
ST	Marc Janko	Austria	2	0	vs Faroe Islands (15 October 2013)	Booked in two 2014 World Cup qualifying matches
FW	Marko Arnautović	Austria	0	1	vs Faroe Islands (15 October 2013)	Sent off in a 2014 World Cup qualifying matches
DF	Benedikt Höwedes	Germany	2	0	vs TBD (2014)	Booked in two 2014 World Cup qualifying matches

== Attendances ==
Team	Highest	Lowest	Average
Austria	48,000	24,200	40,550
Faroe Islands	5,079	4,300	4,690
Germany	72,369	32,769	54,165
Kazakhstan	30,000	7,000	15,396
Republic of Ireland	49,850	21,700	37,491
Sweden	49,436	20,414	34,925
