= Adrian Cieślewicz =

Polish footballer

Personal information
- Date of birth: 26 November 1990 (age 35)
- Place of birth: Gniezno, Poland
- Height: 1.77 m (5 ft 10 in)
- Positions: Winger; striker

Team information
- Current team: Caernarfon Town
- Number: 11

Youth career
- 1999–2007: VB Vágur
- 2007–2009: Manchester City

Senior career*
Years	Team	Apps	(Gls)
2009–2014	Wrexham	146	(17)
2014	Kidderminster Harriers	14	(0)
2014	B36 Tórshavn	3	(0)
2014–2026	The New Saints	273	(78)
2026–	Caernarfon Town	22	(4)
- * Club domestic league appearances and goals as of 08:28, 8 November 2026 (UTC)

Adrian Cieślewicz (born 16 November 1990) is a Polish professional footballer who plays for Cymru Premier side Caernarfon Town. A product of the Manchester City academy, Cieślewicz was born in Poland but grew up in the Faroe Islands, where he moved to at the age of 8. He previously played for The New Saints for 12 years, winning numerous top tier league titles and competitions.

== Career ==
Cieślewicz started his career with VB Vágur, before moving to Manchester City in 2007, spending two-and-a-half years in their youth setup before transferring to Wrexham in the summer of 2009.

After a brief spell with Kidderminster Harriers, Cieślewicz returned to the Faroe Islands in 2014 to play for B36 Tórshavn.

In 2014, he joined Cymru Premier club The New Saints, and over the next 12 years became the club’s longest-serving player, making 380 appearances in all competitions for the club, scoring 98 goals and providing 67 assists. His time with the club was marked by sustained success, winning nine Cymru Premier titles, six Welsh Cups and six Welsh League Cups.

On 2 February 2026, Cieślewicz moved to fellow Cymru Premier club Caernarfon Town.

== Personal life ==
His brother, Łukasz, was also a professional footballer who played for clubs in Denmark and the Faroe Islands. The pair were team-mates at B36 Tórshavn in 2014, and faced each other as opponents in 2015 when The New Saints came up against B36 in a two-legged UEFA Champions League fixture.

Their father Robert also played professional football. The family moved to the Faroe Islands in 1999 following Robert's transfer to Ítróttarfelag Fuglafjarðar.

== Honours ==
B36 Tórshavn

- Faroe Islands Premier League: 2014

The New Saints

- Cymru Premier: 2014–15, 2015–16, 2016–17, 2017–18, 2018–19, 2021–22, 2022–23, 2023–24, 2024–25
- Welsh Cup: 2014–15, 2015–16, 2018–19, 2021–22, 2022–23, 2024–25
- Welsh League Cup: 2014–15, 2015–16, 2016–17, 2017–18, 2023–24, 2024–25

Caernarfon Town

- Welsh Cup: 2025–26
