= UEFA Euro 2020 qualifying Group F =

Football tournament qualifying stage

Group F of UEFA Euro 2020 qualifying was one of the ten groups to decide which teams would qualify for the UEFA Euro 2020 finals tournament. Group F consisted of six teams: Faroe Islands, Malta, Norway, Romania, Spain and Sweden, where they played against each other home-and-away in a round-robin format.

The top two teams, Spain and Sweden, qualified directly for the finals. Unlike previous editions, the participants of the play-offs were not decided based on results from the qualifying group stage, but instead based on their performance in the 2018–19 UEFA Nations League.

== Standings ==
Pos	Team	Pld	W	D	L	GF	GA	GD	Pts	Qualification	(Spain)	(Sweden)	(Norway)	(Romania)	(Faroe Islands)	(Malta)
1	Spain	10	8	2	0	31	5	+26	26	Qualify for final tournament	—	3–0	2–1	5–0	4–0	7–0
2	Sweden	10	6	3	1	23	9	+14	21	Qualify for final tournament	1–1	—	1–1	2–1	3–0	3–0
3	Norway	10	4	5	1	19	11	+8	17	Advance to play-offs via Nations League	1–1	3–3	—	2–2	4–0	2–0
4	Romania	10	4	2	4	17	15	+2	14	Advance to play-offs via Nations League	1–2	0–2	1–1	—	4–1	1–0
5	Faroe Islands	10	1	0	9	4	30	−26	3 (Note: Tied on head-to-head points (3) and head-to-head goal difference (0). Head-to-head away goals: Faroe Islands 1, Malta 0.)		1–4	0–4	0–2	0–3	—	1–0
6	Malta	10	1	0	9	3	27	−24	3		0–2	0–4	1–2	0–4	2–1	—

Source: UEFA
Rules for classification: Qualification tiebreakers

== Matches ==
The fixtures were released by UEFA the same day as the draw, which was held on 2 December 2018 in Dublin. Times are CET/CEST, (Note: CET (UTC+1) for matches in March and November 2019, and CEST (UTC+2) for all other matches.) as listed by UEFA (local times, if different, are in parentheses).

23 March 2019
18:00

Malta	2–1	Faroe Islands
Nwoko 13'; Borg 77' (pen.)	Report	Thomsen 90+8'

National Stadium, Ta' Qali
Attendance: 7,531
Referee: Vilhjálmur Þórarinsson (Iceland)
23 March 2019
18:00

Sweden	2–1	Romania
Quaison 33'; Claesson 40'	Report	Keșerü 58'

Friends Arena, Solna
Attendance: 30,115
Referee: Michael Oliver (England)
23 March 2019
20:45

Spain	2–1	Norway
Rodrigo 16'; Ramos 71' (pen.)	Report	King 65' (pen.)

Mestalla, Valencia
Attendance: 39,752
Referee: Andris Treimanis (Latvia)

26 March 2019
20:45

Malta	0–2	Spain
	Report	Morata 31', 73'

National Stadium, Ta' Qali
Attendance: 16,542
Referee: Andrew Dallas (Scotland)
26 March 2019
20:45

Norway	3–3	Sweden
Johnsen 41'; King 59'; Kamara 90+7'	Report	Claesson 70'; Nordtveit 86' (o.g.); Quaison 90+1'

Ullevaal Stadion, Oslo
Attendance: 23,459
Referee: Gianluca Rocchi (Italy)
26 March 2019
20:45 (21:45 UTC+2)

Romania	4–1	Faroe Islands
Deac 26'; Keșerü 29', 33'; Pușcaș 63'	Report	Davidsen 40' (pen.)

Stadionul Dr. Constantin Rădulescu, Cluj-Napoca
Attendance: 10,502
Referee: Halil Umut Meler (Turkey)

7 June 2019
20:45 (19:45 UTC+1)

Faroe Islands	1–4	Spain
K. Olsen 30'	Report	Ramos 6'; Navas 19'; Gestsson 34' (o.g.); Gayà 71'

Tórsvøllur, Tórshavn
Attendance: 3,226
Referee: Enea Jorgji (Albania)
7 June 2019
20:45

Norway	2–2	Romania
T. Elyounoussi 56'; Ødegaard 70'	Report	Keșerü 77', 90+2'

Ullevaal Stadion, Oslo
Attendance: 17,664
Referee: Sergei Karasev (Russia)
7 June 2019
20:45

Sweden	3–0	Malta
Quaison 2'; Claesson 50'; Isak 81'	Report

Friends Arena, Solna
Attendance: 26,421
Referee: Rob Harvey (Republic of Ireland)

10 June 2019
20:45 (19:45 UTC+1)

Faroe Islands	0–2	Norway
	Report	Johnsen 49', 83'

Tórsvøllur, Tórshavn
Attendance: 3,083
Referee: Donatas Rumšas (Lithuania)
10 June 2019
20:45

Malta	0–4	Romania
	Report	Pușcaș 7', 29'; Chipciu 34'; Man 90+1'

National Stadium, Ta' Qali
Attendance: 6,471
Referee: Dennis Higler (Netherlands)
10 June 2019
20:45

Spain	3–0	Sweden
Ramos 64' (pen.); Morata 85' (pen.); Oyarzabal 87'	Report

Santiago Bernabéu, Madrid
Attendance: 72,205
Referee: Willie Collum (Scotland)

5 September 2019
20:45 (19:45 UTC+1)

Faroe Islands	0–4	Sweden
	Report	Isak 12', 15'; Lindelöf 23'; Quaison 41'

Tórsvøllur, Tórshavn
Attendance: 3,108
Referee: Tiago Martins (Portugal)
5 September 2019
20:45

Norway	2–0	Malta
Berge 34'; King 45+1' (pen.)	Report

Ullevaal Stadion, Oslo
Attendance: 11,269
Referee: Dumitru Muntean (Moldova)
5 September 2019
20:45 (21:45 UTC+3)

Romania	1–2	Spain
Andone 59'	Report	Ramos 29' (pen.); Alcácer 47'

Arena Națională, Bucharest
Attendance: 50,024
Referee: Deniz Aytekin (Germany)

8 September 2019
18:00 (19:00 UTC+3)

Romania	1–0	Malta
Pușcaș 47'	Report

Ilie Oană Stadium, Ploiești
Attendance: 13,376
Referee: Duje Strukan (Croatia)
8 September 2019
20:45

Spain	4–0	Faroe Islands
Rodrigo 13', 50'; Alcácer 90', 90+3'	Report

El Molinón, Gijón
Attendance: 23,644
Referee: Krzysztof Jakubik (Poland)
8 September 2019
20:45

Sweden	1–1	Norway
Forsberg 60'	Report	Johansen 45'

Friends Arena, Solna
Attendance: 38,372
Referee: Slavko Vinčić (Slovenia)

12 October 2019
18:00 (17:00 UTC+1)

Faroe Islands	0–3	Romania
	Report	Pușcaș 74'; Mitriță 83'; Keșerü 90+4'

Tórsvøllur, Tórshavn
Attendance: 2,381
Referee: Aliyar Aghayev (Azerbaijan)
12 October 2019
20:45

Malta	0–4	Sweden
	Report	Danielson 11'; Se. Larsson 58' (pen.), 71' (pen.); Agius 66' (o.g.)

National Stadium, Ta' Qali
Attendance: 10,702
Referee: Sergey Ivanov (Russia)
12 October 2019
20:45

Norway	1–1	Spain
King 90+4' (pen.)	Report	Saúl 47'

Ullevaal Stadion, Oslo
Attendance: 25,200
Referee: Michael Oliver (England)

15 October 2019
20:45 (19:45 UTC+1)

Faroe Islands	1–0	Malta
Baldvinsson 71'	Report

Tórsvøllur, Tórshavn
Attendance: 2,677
Referee: José María Sánchez Martínez (Spain)
15 October 2019
20:45 (21:45 UTC+3)

Romania	1–1	Norway
Mitriță 62'	Report	Sørloth 90+2'

Arena Națională, Bucharest
Attendance: 29,854
Referee: Bobby Madden (Scotland)
15 October 2019
20:45

Sweden	1–1	Spain
Berg 50'	Report	Rodrigo 90+2'

Friends Arena, Solna
Attendance: 49,712
Referee: Clément Turpin (France)

15 November 2019
18:00

Norway	4–0	Faroe Islands
Reginiussen 4'; Fossum 8'; Sørloth 62', 65'	Report

Ullevaal Stadion, Oslo
Attendance: 10,400
Referee: Fran Jović (Croatia)
15 November 2019
20:45 (21:45 UTC+2)

Romania	0–2	Sweden
	Report	Berg 18'; Quaison 34'

Arena Națională, Bucharest
Attendance: 49,678
Referee: Daniele Orsato (Italy)
15 November 2019
20:45

Spain	7–0	Malta
Morata 23'; Cazorla 41'; Pau Torres 62'; Sarabia 63'; Olmo 69'; Gerard 71'; Navas 85'	Report

Ramón de Carranza, Cádiz
Attendance: 19,773
Referee: Viktor Kassai (Hungary)

18 November 2019
20:45

Malta	1–2	Norway
Fenech 40'	Report	King 7'; Sørloth 62'

National Stadium, Ta' Qali
Attendance: 2,708
Referee: Aliyar Aghayev (Azerbaijan)
18 November 2019
20:45

Spain	5–0	Romania
Fabián 8'; Gerard 33', 43'; Rus 45+1' (o.g.); Oyarzabal 90+2'	Report

Metropolitano Stadium, Madrid
Attendance: 36,198
Referee: Aleksei Kulbakov (Belarus)
18 November 2019
20:45

Sweden	3–0	Faroe Islands
Andersson 29'; Svanberg 72'; Guidetti 80'	Report

Friends Arena, Solna
Attendance: 19,737
Referee: Matej Jug (Slovenia)

== Goalscorers ==
There were 97 goals scored in 30 matches, for an average of 3.23 goals per match.

6 goals

- (Romania national football team) Claudiu Keșerü

5 goals

- (Norway national football team) Joshua King
- (Romania national football team) George Pușcaș
- (Sweden men's national football team) Robin Quaison

4 goals

- (Norway national football team) Alexander Sørloth
- (Spain national football team) Álvaro Morata
- (Spain national football team) Sergio Ramos
- (Spain national football team) Rodrigo

3 goals

- (Norway national football team) Bjørn Maars Johnsen
- (Spain national football team) Paco Alcácer
- (Spain national football team) Gerard Moreno
- (Sweden men's national football team) Viktor Claesson
- (Sweden men's national football team) Alexander Isak

2 goals

- (Romania national football team) Alexandru Mitriță
- (Spain national football team) Jesús Navas
- (Spain national football team) Mikel Oyarzabal
- (Sweden men's national football team) Marcus Berg
- (Sweden men's national football team) Sebastian Larsson

1 goal

- (Faroe Islands national football team) Rógvi Baldvinsson
- (Faroe Islands national football team) Viljormur Davidsen
- (Faroe Islands national football team) Klæmint Olsen
- (Faroe Islands national football team) Jákup Thomsen
- (Malta national football team) Steve Borg
- (Malta national football team) Paul Fenech
- (Malta national football team) Kyrian Nwoko
- (Norway national football team) Sander Berge
- (Norway national football team) Tarik Elyounoussi
- (Norway national football team) Iver Fossum
- (Norway national football team) Stefan Johansen
- (Norway national football team) Ola Kamara
- (Norway national football team) Martin Ødegaard
- (Norway national football team) Tore Reginiussen
- (Romania national football team) Florin Andone
- (Romania national football team) Alexandru Chipciu
- (Romania national football team) Ciprian Deac
- (Romania national football team) Dennis Man
- (Spain national football team) Santi Cazorla
- (Spain national football team) José Gayà
- (Spain national football team) Dani Olmo
- (Spain national football team) Fabián Ruiz
- (Spain national football team) Pablo Sarabia
- (Spain national football team) Saúl
- (Spain national football team) Pau Torres
- (Sweden men's national football team) Sebastian Andersson
- (Sweden men's national football team) Marcus Danielson
- (Sweden men's national football team) Emil Forsberg
- (Sweden men's national football team) John Guidetti
- (Sweden men's national football team) Victor Lindelöf
- (Sweden men's national football team) Mattias Svanberg

1 own goal

- (Faroe Islands national football team) Teitur Gestsson (against Spain)
- (Malta national football team) Andrei Agius (against Sweden)
- (Norway national football team) Håvard Nordtveit (against Sweden)
- (Romania national football team) Adrian Rus (against Spain)

== Discipline ==
A player was automatically suspended for the next match for the following offences:

- Receiving a red card (red card suspensions could be extended for serious offences)
- Receiving three yellow cards in three different matches, as well as after fifth and any subsequent yellow card (yellow card suspensions were not carried forward to the play-offs, the finals or any other future international matches)

The following suspensions were served during the qualifying matches:

Team	Player	Offence(s)	Suspended for match(es)
Faroe Islands	Gilli Rólantsson	(yellow card) vs Malta (23 March 2019); (yellow card) vs Norway (10 June 2019); (yellow card) vs Romania (12 October 2019)	vs Malta (15 October 2019)
Malta	Andrei Agius	(red card) vs Faroe Islands (23 March 2019)	vs Spain (26 March 2019)
Malta	Steve Borg	(yellow card) vs Faroe Islands (23 March 2019); (yellow card) vs Romania (10 June 2019); (yellow card) vs Faroe Islands (15 October 2019)	vs Spain (15 November 2019)
Romania	Alexandru Chipciu	(yellow card) (yellow-red card) vs Malta (10 June 2019)	vs Spain (5 September 2019)
Romania	Dragoș Grigore	(yellow card) vs Sweden (23 March 2019); (yellow card) vs Faroe Islands (26 March 2019); (yellow card) vs Norway (7 June 2019)	vs Malta (10 June 2019)
Spain	Diego Llorente	(red card) vs Romania (5 September 2019)	vs Faroe Islands (8 September 2019)
Spain	Sergio Ramos	(yellow card) vs Romania (5 September 2019); (yellow card) vs Faroe Islands (8 September 2019); (yellow card) vs Norway (12 October 2019)	vs Sweden (15 October 2019)
