= Rógvi Baldvinsson =

Faroese footballer (born 1989)

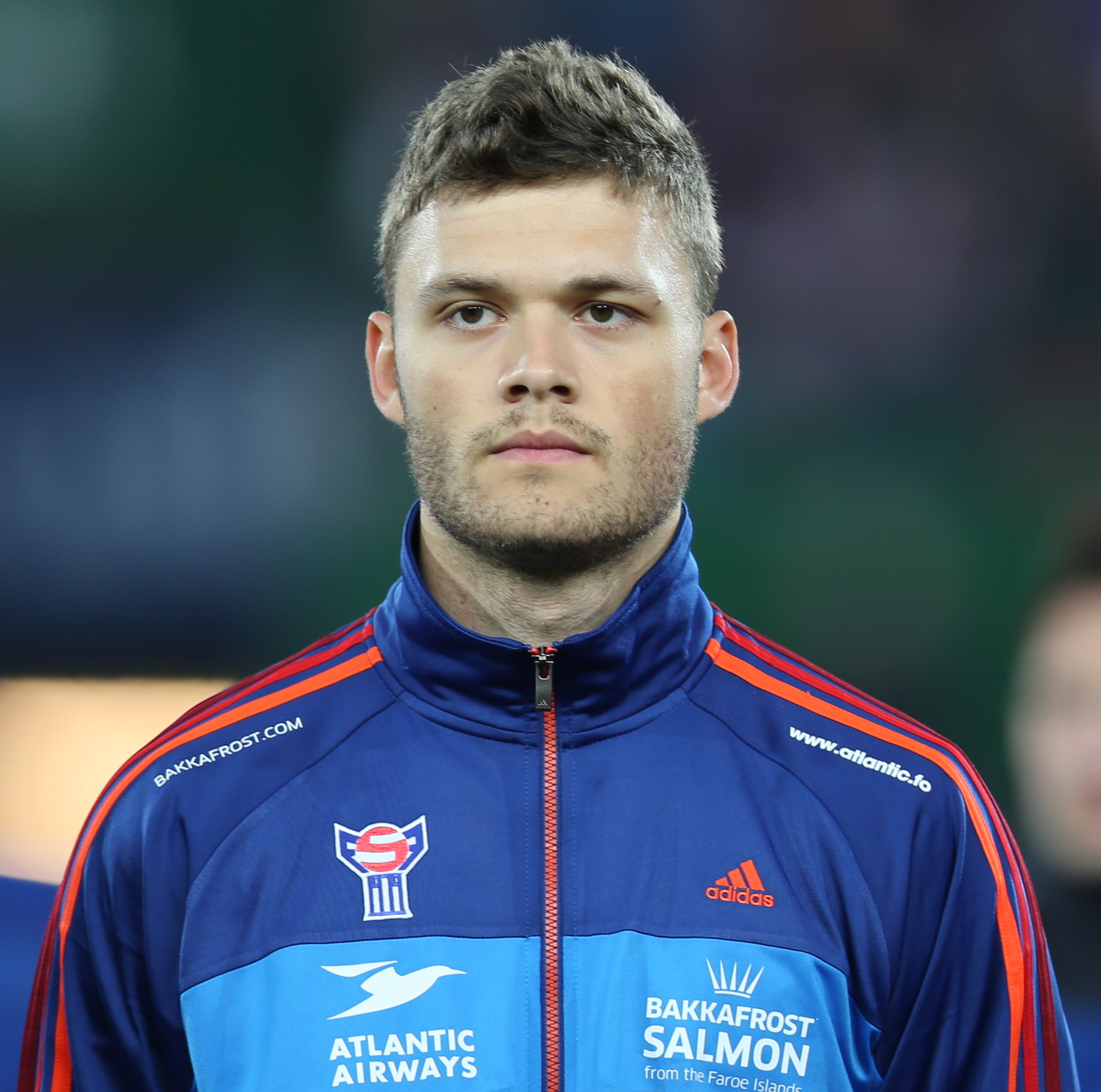
- Rógvi Baldvinsson in 2013

Personal information
- Date of birth: 6 December 1989 (age 36)
- Place of birth: Tórshavn, Faroe Islands
- Height: 1.89 m (6 ft 2 in)
- Position: Left back

Senior career*
Years	Team	Apps	(Gls)
2006–2012	Ålgård	110	(12)
2012	Bristol Rovers	0	(0)
2012	Ålgård	2	(0)
2013	Bryne	22	(0)
2014–2015	Ålgård	38	(8)
2015–2016	FC Fredericia	8	(1)
2016	FK Vidar	24	(4)
2017–2023	Bryne	127	(6)

International career^{‡}
2009–2010	Faroe Islands U-21	2	(1)
2011–	Faroe Islands	49	(4)
- * Club domestic league appearances and goals as of 6 December 2023 ‡ National team caps and goals as of 1 April 2021

Rógvi Baldvinsson (born 6 December 1989) is a Faroese professional footballer who plays as a defender for Bryne. Baldvinsson had a brief spell with Bristol Rovers in 2012.

== Club career ==
He made his debut for the first team as 16-year-old in September 2006 for Norwegian side Ålgård FK. Baldvinsson began his senior career as a striker, but was switched to playing in central defence during his second season with the team. In the 2009/10 season, he was chosen as the new captain of the team. In July 2012 he signed for League Two side Bristol Rovers after being recommended to manager Mark McGhee by former Faroe Islands boss Brian Kerr. His time in Bristol was to last just over two weeks as Baldvinsson announced on his Twitter page that he was to return to Norway for personal reasons, where he rejoined Ålgård FK.

He played for Bryne FK in 2013, but in Ålgård again from 2014.

In 2015 he signed a contract with the Danish club FC Fredericia, who played in the second tier. The contract lasted for the second half of 2015. In 2016 he signed a contract with Norwegian club Vidar who played in the second division of Norway. In 2017 Baldvinsson is playing with Bryne again; the team was relegated from 1. divisjon to 2. divisjon after the 2016 season.

== International career ==
Baldvinsson represented Faroe Islands at under-21 level. He was first called up to the Faroe Islands national football team in October 2010 and made his international debut in June 2011. Baldvinsson scored his first international goal in the 2014 World Cup qualifier against Sweden on 12 October 2012, when he sent his team up in a 1–0 lead in the eventual 1–2 loss.

=== International goals ===
Scores and results list Faroe Island's goal tally first.

#	Date	Venue	Opponent	Score	Result	Competition
1.	12 October 2012	Tórsvøllur, Tórshavn, Faroe Islands	Sweden	1–0	1–2	2014 FIFA World Cup qualification
2.	19 November 2013	Ta' Qali National Stadium, Ta' Qali, Malta	Malta	2–3	2–3	Friendly
3.	31 August 2017	Estádio do Bessa, Porto, Portugal	Portugal	1–2	1–5	2018 FIFA World Cup qualification
4.	15 October 2019	Tórsvøllur, Tórshavn, Faroe Islands	Malta	1–0	1–0	UEFA Euro 2020 qualification

== Career statistics ==
Season	Club	Division	League		Cup		Total	
Season	Club	Division	Apps	Goals	Apps	Goals	Apps	Goals
2007	Ålgård	2. divisjon	16	1	1	0	17	1
2008	Ålgård	2. divisjon	21	0	2	0	23	0
2009	Ålgård	2. divisjon	20	3	2	0	22	3
2010	Ålgård	2. divisjon	23	4	1	0	24	4
2011	Ålgård	2. divisjon	20	3	1	0	21	3
2012	Ålgård	2. divisjon	12	1	2	0	14	1
2013	Bryne	1. divisjon	22	0	3	0	25	0
2014	Ålgård	2. divisjon	20	0	1	0	21	0
2015	Ålgård	3. divisjon	18	8	3	0	21	8
2016	Vidar	2. divisjon	24	4	3	0	27	4
2017	Bryne	2. divisjon	19	2	1	0	20	2
2018	Bryne	2. divisjon	19	1	2	0	21	1
2019	Bryne	2. divisjon	21	0	3	1	24	1
2020	Bryne	2. divisjon	10	1	0	0	10	1
Career Total			265	28	25	1	290	29

== Personal life ==
Baldvinsson was born in the Faroe Islands. When he was five years old he moved to Norway with his parents.
