= Łukasz Cieślewicz =

Polish footballer (born 1987)

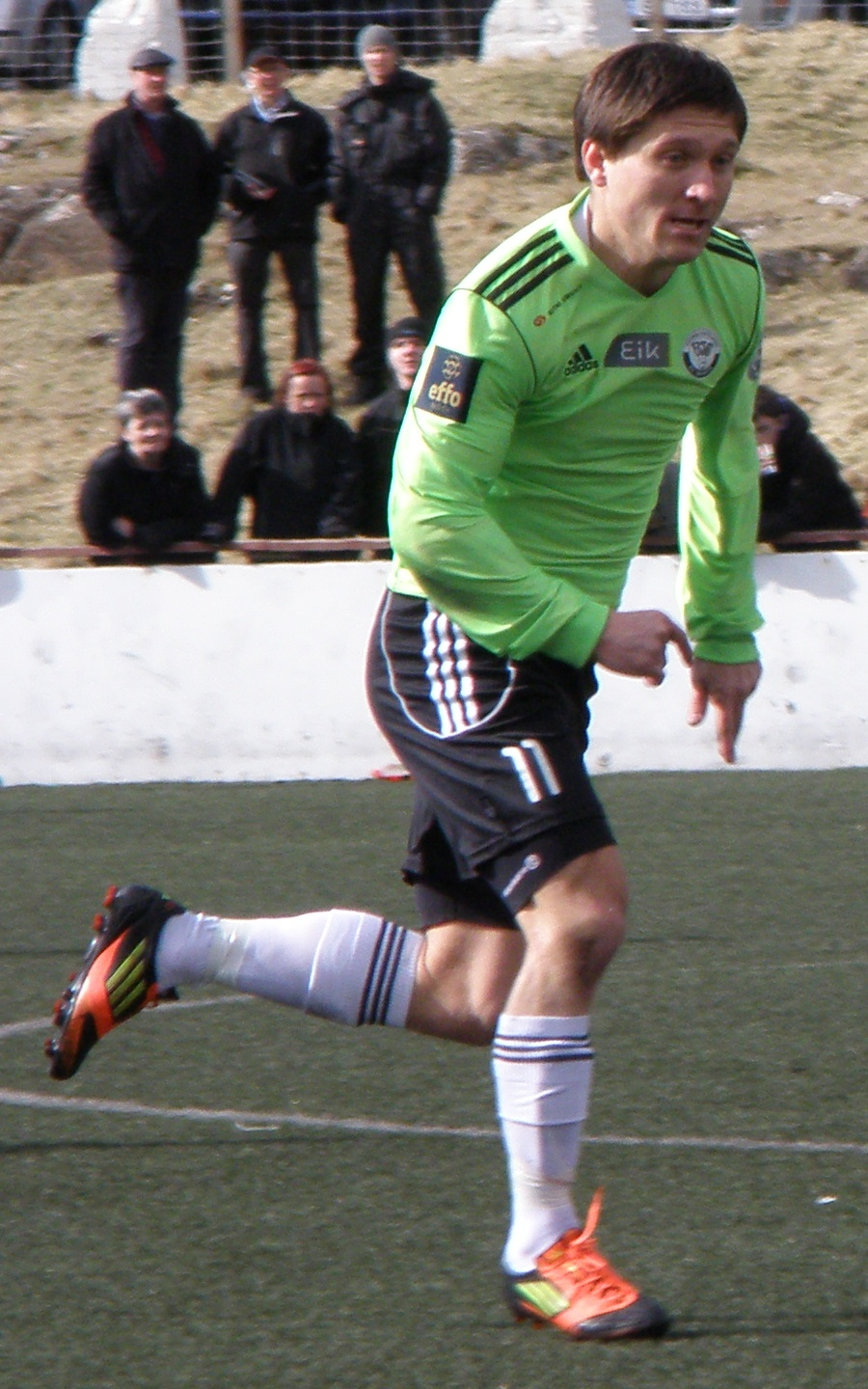
- Łukasz Cieślewicz playing for B36 Tórshavn in 2012.

Personal information
- Date of birth: 15 November 1987 (age 38)
- Place of birth: Gniezno, Poland
- Height: 1.82 m (6 ft 0 in)
- Position: Forward

Team information
- Current team: HB (caretaker manager); HB II (manager)

Youth career
- –1999: Mieszko Gniezno
- 1999–2003: VB Vágur
- 2004–2006: Brøndby

Senior career*
Years	Team	Apps	(Gls)
2006–2008	Brøndby	0	(0)
2008	→ Hvidovre (loan)	15	(2)
2008–2010	Hvidovre	70	(10)
2011–2019	B36 Tórshavn	207	(84)
2020–2021	Víkingur Gøta	18	(3)
2021–2022	B68 Toftir	32	(7)
Total		342	(106)

Managerial career
- 2023–2025: HB women
- 2025–: HB II
- 2025–2026: HB (assistant)
- 2026–: HB (caretaker)
- * Club domestic league appearances and goals

Łukasz Cieślewicz (born 15 November 1987) is a Polish professional football manager and former player. He is currently the caretaker manager of Faroe Islands Premier League club HB and in charge of their reserve team. As a player, Cieślewicz has won the Faroe Islands Premier League three times, and he has been named its best player twice.

== Playing career ==
Cieślewicz started his football with local club Mieszko Gniezno. He moved to the Faroe Islands when he was 12, when his father moved to the country to play for ÍF Fuglafjørður. Cieślewicz would play in the Faroes with VB Vágur. In 2003, aged 16, he moved from Vágur to Denmark to play for Brøndby. In Brøndby he played with the club's reserve team in the Danish 2nd Division, becoming a fan favorite. Failing to make any first team appearances for Brøndby, Cieślewicz was loaned out to Hvidovre in the Danish 1st Division. Following a string of good performances which helped Hvidovre avoid relegation, he made a permanent move to the club signing a two-year contract in July 2008. In the summer of 2010 Cieślewicz was on trial in Lyngby, and after failing to secure a permanent deal with them, he signed a half-year contract with Hvidovre.

In January 2011 Cieślewicz signed a contract with B36 Tórshavn of the Faroe Islands Premier League. In June 2011 he scored a hat-trick, as B36 won 4–1 against KÍ Klaksvík. Cieślewicz also scored the winning goal against EB/Streymur, to help B36 secure its ninth league title, with one match left in the league. At the end of the season he was named Player of the Year in the league, after appearing in all 27 games and scoring 17 goals. In November 2012 he went on trial to Warta Poznań, but in January 2013 he returned to B36. In January 2013 he joined Polish Ekstraklasa side Ruch Chorzów on trial, but, although he scored two goals in the two friendly matches he was used, he was not offered a contract by Ruch's manager Jacek Zieliński. With two games left in the 2014 season, Cieślewicz helped his team secure its tenth title as he provided the assist for teammate Adeshina Lawal to equalise on the way to B36's 3–1 win over B68 Toftir. In July 2015 Cieślewicz played against his brother, Adrian, for the first time in his life in the first qualifying round of the Champions League. The brothers appeared in both games, and Łukasz scored in the second leg, but B36 was eventually eliminated by The New Saints. Łukasz was named Midfielder of the Year and Player of the Year at the end of the 2015 season.

== Managerial career ==
On 11 January 2023, Cieślewicz became the manager of HB Tórshavn's women's team. On 17 October 2025, he became the manager of the men's reserve team and assistant manager of the men's first-team.

On 20 June 2026, Cieślewicz was appointed caretaker manager of HB's first-team following the dismissal of André Olsen.

== Personal life ==
Cieślewicz was born in 1987 in Gniezno, Poland to Polish professional football player Robert Cieślewicz. Łukasz's brother, Adrian, is also a professional football player, playing for Caernarfon Town. The two of them were teammates in 2014, as they played for B36. Łukasz has described himself as a non-practicing Catholic.

== Honours ==
B36 Tórshavn

- Faroe Islands Premier League: 2011, 2014, 2015
- Faroe Islands Cup: 2018

Individual

- Faroe Islands Player of the Year: 2011, 2015
