= Jóhan Troest Davidsen =

Faroese footballer (born 1988)

Jóhan T. Davidsen
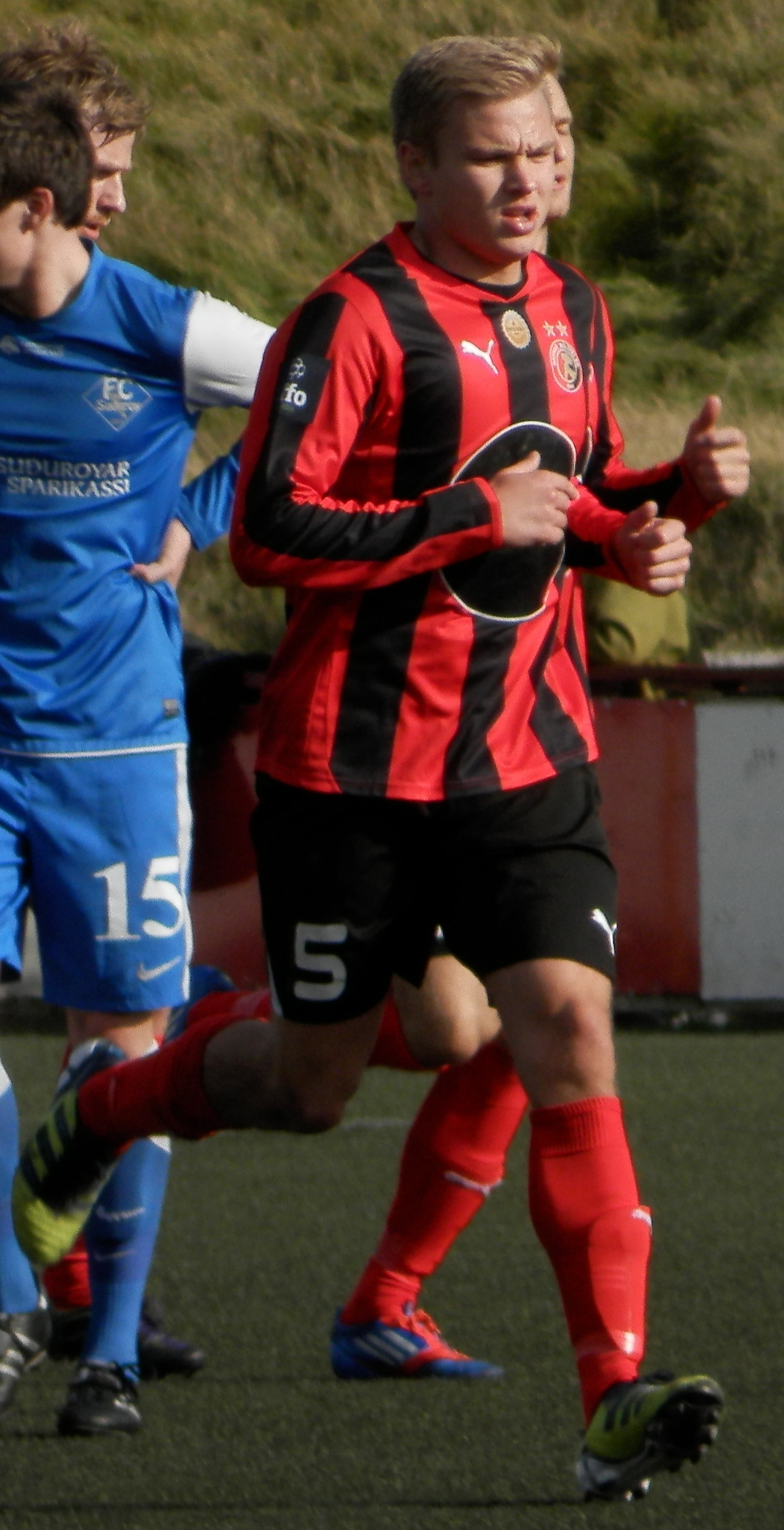

Personal information
- Full name: Jóhan Troest Davidsen
- Date of birth: 31 January 1988 (age 38)
- Place of birth: Saltangará, Faroe Islands
- Height: 1.78 m (5 ft 10 in)
- Position: Centre back

Team information
- Current team: NSÍ Runavík
- Number: 5

Youth career
- NSÍ Runavík
- FH Hafnarfjörður
- 2005–2006: Everton

Senior career*
Years	Team	Apps	(Gls)
2004	NSÍ Runavík	3	(0)
2006	→ NSÍ Runavík (loan)	9	(0)
2006	→ Skála ÍF (loan)	17	(1)
2007–2010	NSÍ Runavík	100	(5)
2011	Aarhus Fremad	?	(?)
2012–2017	HB Tórshavn	139	(7)
2018–	NSÍ Runavík	11	(2)

International career^{‡}
2003–2004	U17 Faroe Islands	13	(1)
2005–2006	U19 Faroe Islands	6	(0)
2007–2009	U21 Faroe Islands	5	(0)
2007–	Faroe Islands	35	(0)
- * Club domestic league appearances and goals as of 3 June 2018 ‡ National team caps and goals as of 26 March 2017 (UTC)

Jóhan Troest Davidsen (born 31 January 1988) is a Faroese footballer who plays as a centre back for NSÍ Runavík.

== Club career ==
Davidsen started his career with NSÍ Runavík in the Faroe Islands, in 2004 he signed a trainee contract with Premier League club Everton and was part of U19 squad. As he did not succeed in England, he returned to his home country.

In 2006, Jóhan Troest Davidsen went to NSÍ Runavík where he played half a season. The other half of the season Davidsen played for Skála ÍF, after which he returned to NSÍ. In 2007, Davidsen became national champions with NSÍ Runavík.

== International career ==
He has won 33 caps for the Faroe Islands national football team.

== Honours ==
NSÍ Runarvík

- Faroe Islands Premier League (1): 2010

HB Tórshavn

- Faroe Islands Premier League (1): 2013
- Faroe Islands Premier League Defender of the season (2): 2013, 2014
- Faroe Islands Premier League Team of the season (2): 2013, 2014
