= Klæmint Olsen =

Faroese footballer

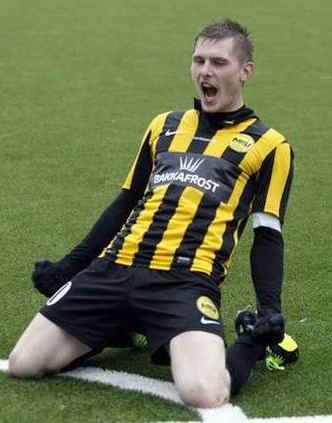
- Olsen celebrating a goal in the 2013 Effodeildin season

Personal information
- Full name: Klæmint Andrasson Olsen
- Date of birth: 17 July 1990 (age 36)
- Place of birth: Runavík, Faroe Islands
- Height: 1.85 m (6 ft 1 in)
- Position: Striker

Team information
- Current team: NSÍ Runavík
- Number: 10

Senior career*
Years	Team	Apps	(Gls)
2007–	NSÍ Runavík	434	(266)
2023	→ Breiðablik (loan)	20	(6)

International career
2005–2006	Faroe Islands U17	14	(2)
2007–2008	Faroe Islands U19	4	(1)
2011–2012	Faroe Islands U21	7	(0)
2012–2024	Faroe Islands	64	(10)
- * Club domestic league appearances and goals as of 2 June 2026

Klæmint Andrasson Olsen (born 17 July 1990) is a Faroese professional footballer who plays as a striker for Faroe Islands Premier League side NSÍ Runavík.

Olsen spent his entire football career with his hometown club NSÍ, except for a loan to Breiðablik in 2023. He is the all-time top scorer in the Faroe Islands Premier League with 265 goals. He has been the top goalscorer of the Faroe Islands Premier League seven times.

He is Faroe Islands national team's jointop goalscorer with 10 goals tied with Rógvi Jacobsen.

== Club career ==
In the 2011 season, Olsen was the Faroese league's second highest scorer, scoring 17 goals in the league for NSÍ Runavík.

On 15 September 2013, he scored all four goals in a 4–3 win against KÍ.

Beginning in 2013, Olsen won the Golden Boot in four consecutive seasons. In the 2013 season, Olsen was the highest goal-scorer in the division with 21 goals, winning the Golden Boot. In the following three seasons, he was once again the highest scorer: in 2014, with 22 goals; in 2015, with 21 goals; and in 2016, with 23 goals. He won the Golden Boot again in 2019 with 26 goals and in 2020 together with Uroš Stojanov they scored 17 goals each.

Olsen scored a hat-trick for NSÍ in a 2018–19 UEFA Europa League qualifier against Hibernian. In the 2020–21 season, he scored a hat-trick against Barry Town United in a Europa League qualifier, becoming the first Faroese to score two hat-tricks in European football.

On 27 September 2020, he scored his 200th goal number in the Faroe Islands Premier League, becoming the first male player to score 200 goals in the Faroese top tier. All 200 goals were scored for the same club, NSÍ Runavík. He scored in a 4–1 victory against Skála ÍF.

On 13 December 2022, Olsen agreed to join Besta deild karla club Breiðablik on a one-year loan deal. At the same time he has renewed his contract with Runavík till the end of 2024.

== International career ==
Olsen was first called up to the Faroe Islands squad in February 2012 for a training camp held in Spain and scored the winning goal in a friendly match against Spanish team La Union. He made his official debut in a World Cup qualifying match versus Germany on 7 September 2012, coming on as a late substitute.

Olsen scored his first international goal on 7 July 2019 during the 4–1 loss against Spain during UEFA Euro 2020 qualifying.

On 15 November 2021, in a 2022 FIFA World Cup qualification game against Israel, he scored his 10th international goal, becoming Faroe Islands’ joint top goalscorer tied with Rogvi Jacobsen.

== Personal life ==
Olsen works as a school janitor while also playing football.

== Career statistics ==
=== Club ===
Appearances and goals by club, season and competition
Club	Season	League			Cup		Continental		Other		Total	
Club	Season	Division	Apps	Goals	Apps	Goals	Apps	Goals	Apps	Goals	Apps	Goals
NSÍ Runavík	2007	Meistaradeildin	5	0		0	—		—		5	0
NSÍ Runavík	2008	Meistaradeildin	9	0		0	1 (Note: Appearances in UEFA Champions League)	0	0	0	10	0
NSÍ Runavík	2009	Meistaradeildin	23	3		0	2 (Note: Appearances in UEFA Europa League)	0	—		25	3
NSÍ Runavík	2010	Meistaradeildin	25	11		0	2	0	—		27	11
NSÍ Runavík	2011	Meistaradeildin	25	18	0	0	2	0	—		27	18
NSÍ Runavík	2012	Meistaradeildin	27	14	1	1	2	0	—		30	15
NSÍ Runavík	2013	Meistaradeildin	26	21	3	3	—		—		29	24
NSÍ Runavík	2014	Meistaradeildin	27	21	1	2	—		—		28	23
NSÍ Runavík	2015	Meistaradeildin	27	21	4	2	2	1	—		33	24
NSÍ Runavík	2016	Meistaradeildin	27	23	4	0	2	0	—		33	23
NSÍ Runavík	2017	Meistaradeildin	27	16	5	5	2	0	—		34	21
NSÍ Runavík	2018	Meistaradeildin	22	13	1	0	2	3	1 (Note: Appearances in Faroe Islands Super Cup)	0	26	16
NSÍ Runavík	2019	Meistaradeildin	27	26	1	1	2	0	—		30	27
NSÍ Runavík	2020	Meistaradeildin	25	17	2	1	2	3	—		29	21
NSÍ Runavík	2021	Meistaradeildin	26	16	5	5	2 (Note: Appearances in UEFA Conference League)	0	1	1	34	22
NSÍ Runavík	2022	Meistaradeildin	25	9	1	0	—		—		26	9
NSÍ Runavík	2023	Meistaradeildin	—		—		—		—		0	0
NSÍ Runavík	2024	Meistaradeildin	26	9	1	2	—		—		27	11
NSÍ Runavík	2025	Meistaradeildin	26	26	1	0	2	1	—		29	27
NSÍ Runavík	2026	Meistaradeildin	19	4	2	3	3	0	—		24	7
NSÍ Runavík	Total		444	269	32	25	28	8	2	1	506	303
Breiðablik (loan)	2023	Besta deild karla	20	6	4	4	14 (Note: Six appearances and one goal in UEFA Champions League, two appearances in UEFA Europa League, six appearances and two goals in UEFA Conference League)	3	2 (Note: Appearances in Icelandic League Cup)	0	40	13
Career total			464	275	36	29	42	11	4	1	546	316

=== International ===
Appearances and goals by national team and year
National team	Year	Apps	Goals
Faroe Islands	2012	1	0
Faroe Islands	2013	1	0
Faroe Islands	2014	2	0
Faroe Islands	2015	2	0
Faroe Islands	2016	2	0
Faroe Islands	2017	3	0
Faroe Islands	2018	7	0
Faroe Islands	2019	9	1
Faroe Islands	2020	6	4
Faroe Islands	2021	11	5
Faroe Islands	2022	9	0
Faroe Islands	2023	6	0
Faroe Islands	2024	4	0
Total		64	10

Scores and results list Faroe Islands' goal tally first, score column indicates score after each Olsen goal.

List of international goals scored by Klæmint Olsen
No.	Date	Venue	Opponent	Score	Result	Competition
1	7 June 2019	Tórsvøllur, Tórshavn, Faroe Islands	Spain	1–2	1–4	UEFA Euro 2020 qualifying
2	3 September 2020	Tórsvøllur, Tórshavn, Faroe Islands	Malta	1–0	3–2	2020–21 UEFA Nations League D
3	6 September 2020	Estadi Nacional, Andorra la Vella, Andorra	Andorra	1–0	1–0	2020–21 UEFA Nations League D
4	13 October 2020	Tórsvøllur, Tórshavn, Faroe Islands	Andorra	1–0	2–0	2020–21 UEFA Nations League D
5	13 October 2020	Tórsvøllur, Tórshavn, Faroe Islands	Andorra	2–0	2–0	2020–21 UEFA Nations League D
6	7 June 2021	Tórsvøllur, Tórshavn, Faroe Islands	Liechtenstein	1–1	5–1	Friendly
7	7 June 2021	Tórsvøllur, Tórshavn, Faroe Islands	Liechtenstein	4–1	5–1	Friendly
8	7 September 2021	Tórsvøllur, Tórshavn, Faroe Islands	Moldova	1–0	2–1	2022 FIFA World Cup qualification
9	12 November 2021	Parken Stadium, Copenhagen, Denmark	Denmark	1–2	1–3	2022 FIFA World Cup qualification
10	15 November 2021	Netanya Stadium, Netanya, Israel	Israel	2–2	2–3	2022 FIFA World Cup qualification

== Honours ==
NSÍ Runavík

- Faroe Islands Premier League: 2026
