= Páll Guðlaugsson =

Icelandic footballer and coach

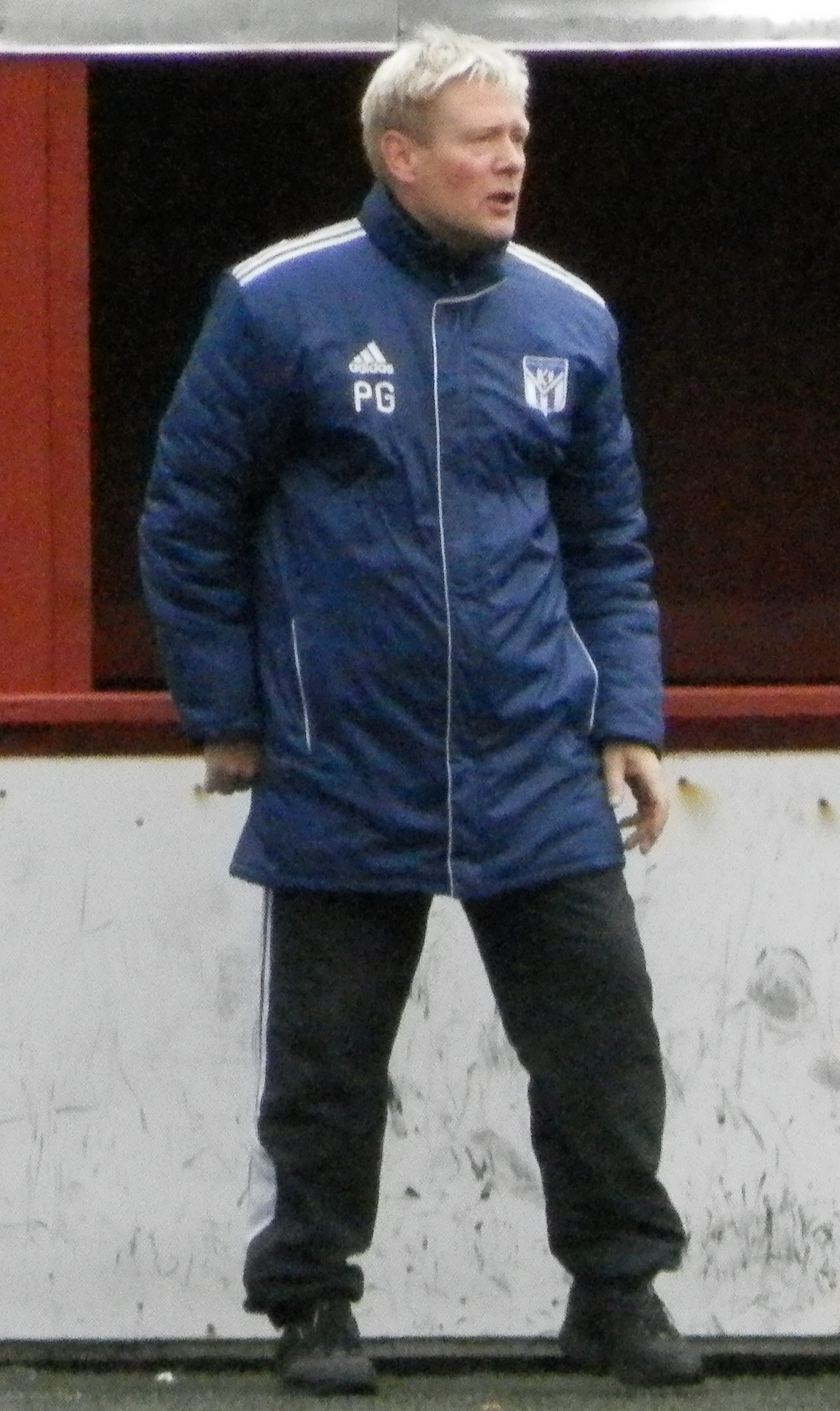
- Páll Guðlaugsson in 2012

Personal information
- Full name: Páll Hagbert Guðlaugsson
- Date of birth: 9 September 1958 (age 68)
- Place of birth: Reykjavík, Iceland

Senior career*
Years	Team	Apps	(Gls)
1981–1983	GÍ Gøta	38	(0)
1984	Þór Akureyri	?	(?)
1985	GÍ Gøta	0	(0)
1987–1989	ÍF Fuglafjørður	19	(0)
1991	EB Eiði	0	(0)
1993	B68 Toftir II	4	(0)
1994	EB/Streymur	8	(0)
1994	B36 Tórshavn	0	(0)
1996	GÍ Gøta II	0	(0)

Managerial career
- 1988–93: Faroe Islands
- 1989–91: ÍF Fuglafjørður
- 1993–94: EB/Streymur
- 1994: B36 Tórshavn
- 1995–96: Faroe Islands (assistant)
- 1996–97: GÍ Gøta
- 2000: Keflavík
- 2009–10: KF Fjarðabyggðar
- 2012–13: KÍ Klaksvík
- 2013–15: TB Tvøroyri
- 2015–17: B68 Toftir
- * Club domestic league appearances and goals

Páll Guðlaugsson (born 9 September 1958) is an Icelandic football coach and former footballer. He was the coach of the Faroe Islands in his 1–0 victory against Austria, in his first official match. He is currently the coach of B68 Toftir after spending two and a half year as coach of TB Tvøroyri, the oldest football club of the Faroese football.

== Manager ==
Updated 16 June 2016

Team	Nat	From	To	Record				
Team	Nat	From	To	G	W	D	L	Win %
Faroe Islands	(Faroe Islands)	1988	1993	25	2	3	20	8.00

- includes only UEFA and FIFA official matches.
