= Adeshina Lawal =

Nigerian footballer (born 1984)

Personal information
- Full name: Adeshina Abayomi Lawal
- Date of birth: 17 October 1984 (age 42)
- Place of birth: Ibadan, Nigeria
- Height: 1.72 m (5 ft 8 in)
- Position: Forward

Team information
- Current team: ÍF II
- Number: 19

Youth career
- 1997–2000: Spartans
- 2001–2003: Ebedei

Senior career*
Years	Team	Apps	(Gls)
2003–2004	Midtjylland	28	(8)
2004–2010	Vejle	128	(39)
2009	→ Lyngby (loan)	8	(3)
2011	Kristianstads FF	0	(0)
2011–2012	Hobro	2	(0)
2013–2014	B36 Tórshavn	50	(23)
2015–2016	ÍF	43	(20)
2017–2019	Víkingur	74	(32)
2020	AB Argir	27	(2)
2022–	ÍF II	2	(0)
- * Club domestic league appearances and goals

Adeshina Abayomi Lawal (born 17 October 1984) is a Nigerian professional footballer who plays as a forward for 2. deild karla club ÍF II, the reserve team of ÍF.

== Career ==
Brought in from the Nigerian FC Ebedei Football Academy to Denmark at a young age, Lawal joined FC Midtjylland's youth academy. In March 2006 he renewed his contract with Vejle Boldklub until 1 July 2010. Lawal played 2009 Vejle Boldklub of the Danish Superliga, but he was on loan to Lyngby Boldklub. After the end of the season 2010 joined to Swedish club Kristianstads FF. In December 2012 he made contract with B36 Tórshavn in the Faroe Islands. In 2015, he signed for ÍF Fuglafjørður

He joined Víkingur Gøta in 2017, and scored the winning goal in their 2–1 2017–18 Champions League home triumph over KF Trepça'89 of Kosovo.

== Honours ==
B36 Tórshavn

- Faroe Islands Premier League Team of the season: 2014
