= Teitur Gestsson =

Faroese footballer

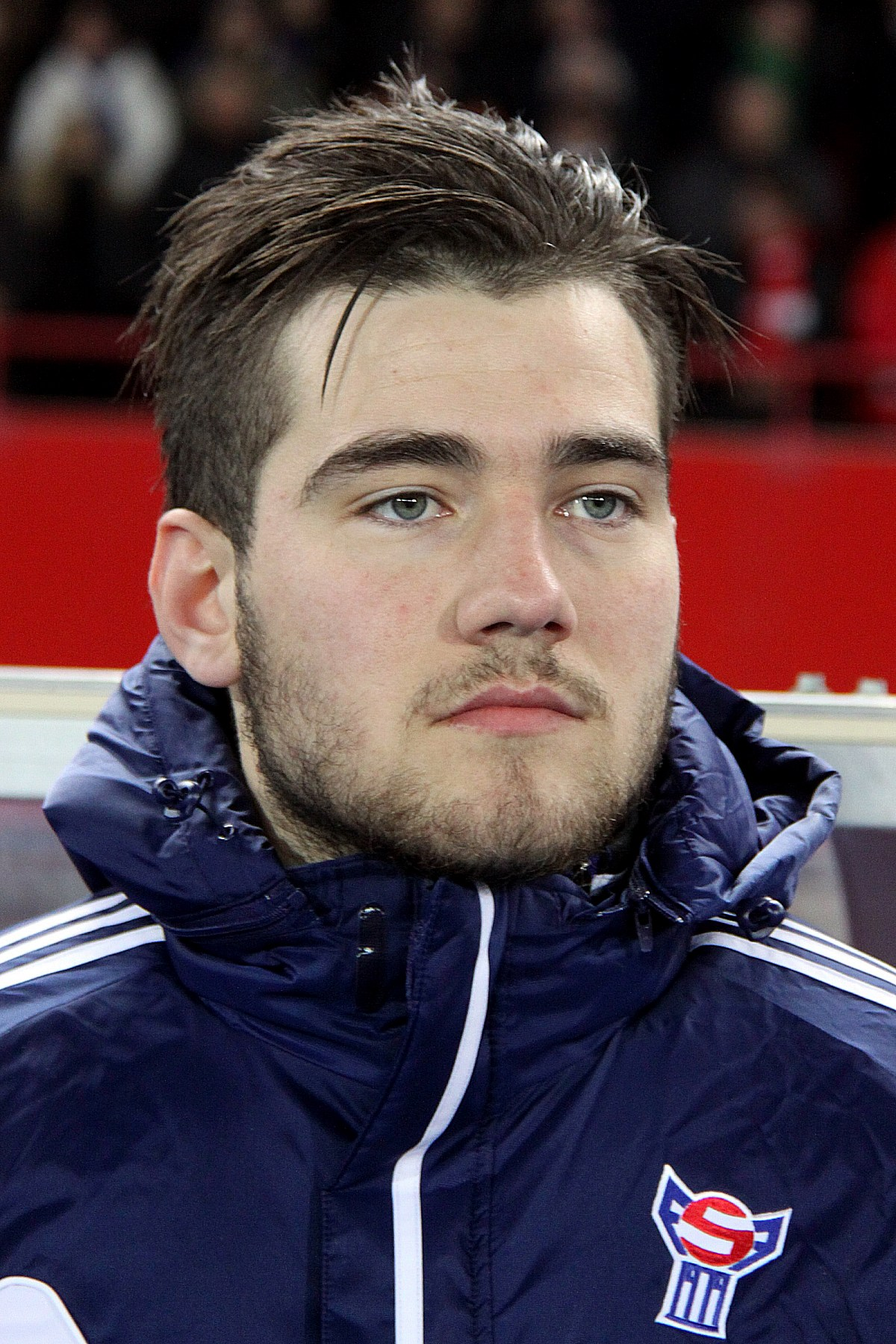

Personal information
- Full name: Teitur Matras Gestsson
- Date of birth: 19 August 1992 (age 34)
- Place of birth: Faroe Islands
- Height: 1.90 m (6 ft 3 in)
- Position: Goalkeeper

Youth career
- 2000–2008: KÍ Klaksvík
- 2008–2011: HB Tórshavn
- 2011: Odense Boldklub

Senior career*
Years	Team	Apps	(Gls)
2011–2025	HB Tórshavn	343	(1)

International career^{‡}
2007–2008	U17 Faroe Islands	13	(0)
2009–2010	U19 Faroe Islands	4	(0)
2009–2013	U21 Faroe Islands	5	(0)
2014–2024	Faroe Islands	24	(0)
- * Club domestic league appearances and goals as of 27 October 2024 ‡ National team caps and goals as of 14 November 2024

Teitur Matras Gestsson (born 19 August 1992) is a Faroese retired football goalkeeper, who played 416 matches for HB Tórshavn.

Now, after retiring, he is currently working on completing his UEFA B license in coaching (as of 2025) and is the manager of HB's second team, which competes in 2. deild (as of 2025).

== International career ==
Gestsson made his first international appearance on 1 March 2014 in a friendly match in and against Gibraltar, where he stood in the goal during the first half.

== Career statistics ==
=== Club ===
As of matches played on 28 September 2024.

Club	Season	League			Faroe Islands Cup		Faroe Islands Super Cup		Continental		Total	
Club	Season	Division	Apps	Goals	Apps	Goals	Apps	Goals	Apps	Goals	Apps	Goals
HB	2011	Faroe Islands Premier League	14	1	0	0	0	0	2 (Note: Appearance(s) in UEFA Champions League)	0	16	1
HB	2012	Faroe Islands Premier League	25	0	4	0	—		—		29	0
HB	2013	Faroe Islands Premier League	24	0	0	0	—		2 (Note: Appearance(s) in UEFA Europa League)	0	26	0
HB	2014	Faroe Islands Premier League	26	0	4	0	1	0	4	0	35	0
HB	2015	Faroe Islands Premier League	27	0	4	0	—		2	0	33	0
HB	2016	Faroe Islands Premier League	27	0	1	0	—		2	0	30	0
HB	2017	Faroe Islands Premier League	27	0	4	1	—		—		31	1
HB	2018	Faroe Islands Premier League	26	0	5	0	—		—		31	0
HB	2019	Faroe Islands Premier League	27	0	5	0	1	0	3 (Note: Two appearances in UEFA Champions League, One appearance in UEFA Europa League)	0	36	0
HB	2020	Faroe Islands Premier League	27	0	4	0	1	0	1	0	33	0
HB	2021	Faroe Islands Premier League	27	0	3	0	1	0	5 (Note: One appearance in UEFA Champions League, Four appearances in UEFA Europa Conference League)	0	36	0
HB	2022	Faroe Islands Premier League	24	0	2	0	—		2 (Note: Appearance(s) in UEFA Europa Conference League)	0	28	0
HB	2023	Faroe Islands Premier League	18	0	3	0	—		0	0	21	0
HB	2024	Faroe Islands Premier League	21	0	3	0	1	0	2	0	27	0
Career total			340	1	42	1	5	0	25	0	412	2

=== International ===
As of match played 22 March 2024

Appearances and goals by national team and year
National team	Year	Apps	Goals
Faroe Islands	2014	1	0
Faroe Islands	2016	1	0
Faroe Islands	2018	2	0
Faroe Islands	2019	2	0
Faroe Islands	2020	6	0
Faroe Islands	2021	7	0
Faroe Islands	2022	1	0
Faroe Islands	2023	2	0
Faroe Islands	2024	1	0
Total		23	0

== Honours ==
HB Tórshavn

- Faroe Islands Premier League: 2013, 2018
- Faroe Islands Cup: 2019
- Faroe Islands Super Cup: 2019

Individual

- Faroe Islands Premier League Goalkeeper of the season: 2013, 2014
- Faroe Islands Premier League Team of the season: 2013, 2014
