= Bárður Hansen =

Faroese footballer (born 1992)

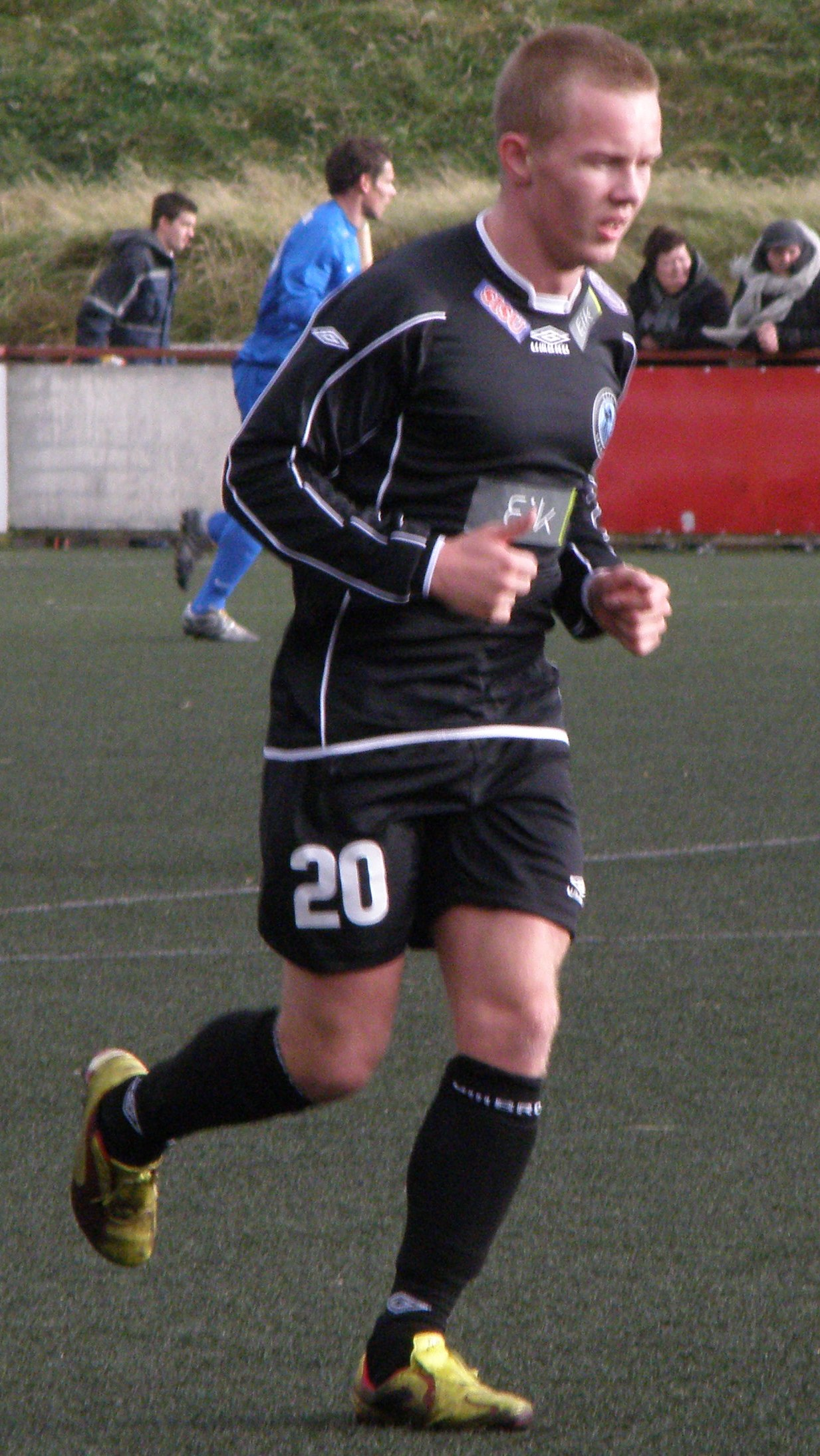

Personal information
- Full name: Bárður Jógvanson Hansen
- Date of birth: 13 March 1992 (age 34)
- Place of birth: Tórshavn, Faroe Islands
- Height: 1.68 m (5 ft 6 in)
- Positions: Defender; winger

Team information
- Current team: NSÍ Runavík II

Senior career*
Years	Team	Apps	(Gls)
2008–2016	Víkingur	278	(40)
2016–2017	Fremad Amager	14	(0)
2017–2020	NSÍ Runavík	76	(6)
2021–2022	Víkingur	41	(0)
2024–	NSÍ Runavík II	4	(0)

International career^{‡}
2006	U15 Faroe Islands		
2008	U17 Faroe Islands	3	
2015–2017	Faroe Islands	5	(0)
- * Club domestic league appearances and goals as of 1 November 2026 ‡ National team caps and goals as of 26 March 2017

Bárður Jógvanson Hansen (born 13 March 1992) is a Faroese professional footballer who plays for NSÍ Runavík II.

== Career ==
=== Club career ===
Bárður Jógvanson Hansen got his debut for Víkingur in the Faroese Premier League in 2008 as a 16-year-old. He won the Faroese Cup with Víkingur in 2009 and played in both matches against Turkish Beşiktaş in the Europa League second qualifying round in 2010.

=== International career ===
Hansen made his international debut against Greece on 13 June 2015, in a 2–1 win.
