= Pól Jóhannus Justinussen =

Faroese footballer

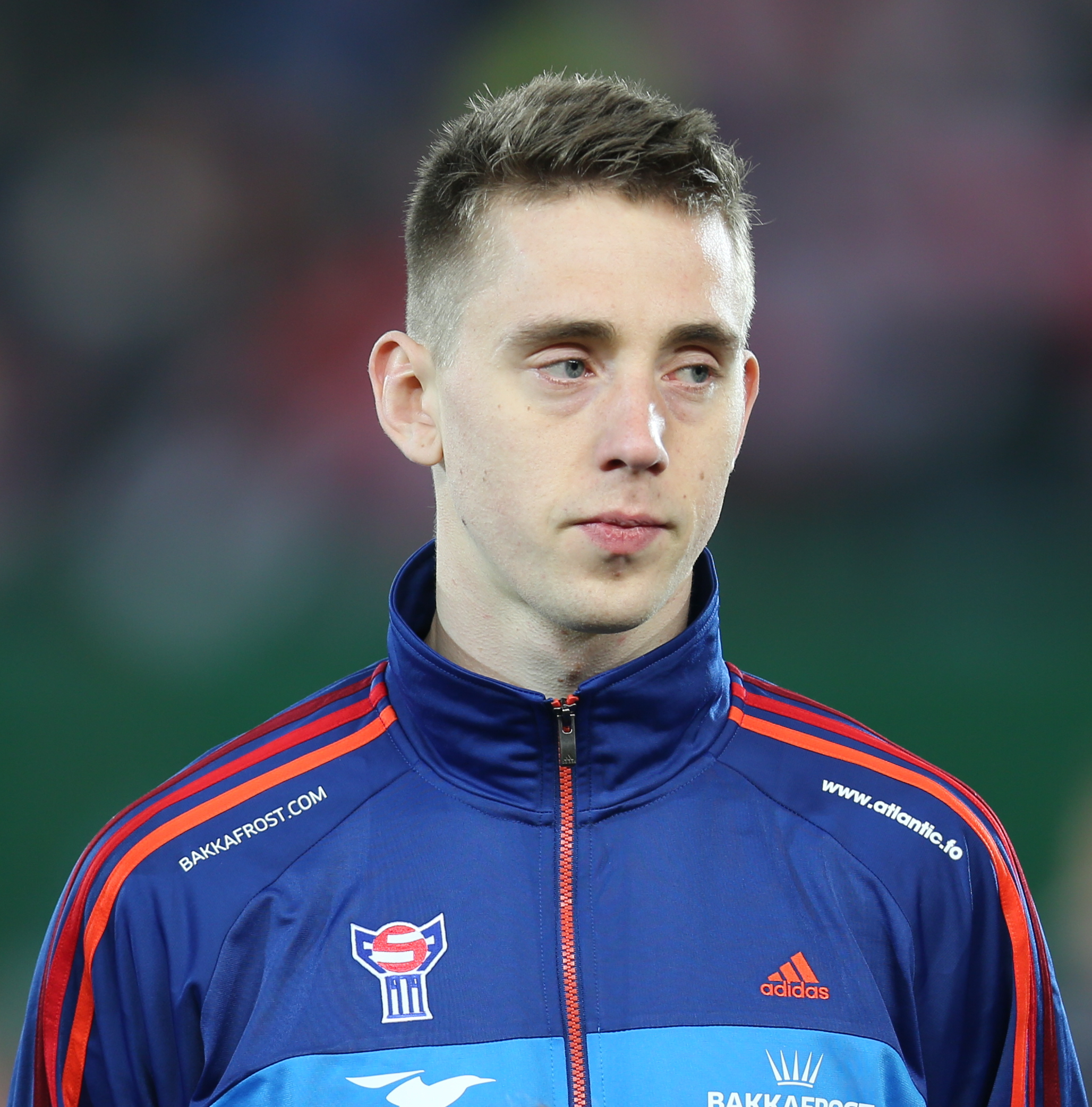
- Justinussen in 2013

Personal information
- Date of birth: 13 January 1989 (age 37)
- Place of birth: Runavík, Faroe Islands
- Height: 1.90 m (6 ft 3 in)
- Position: Midfielder

Team information
- Current team: NSÍ

Senior career*
Years	Team	Apps	(Gls)
2005–2006	NSÍ	0	(0)
2007	GÍ Gøta	26	(6)
2008	NSÍ	6	(0)
2008–2010	B68 Toftir	61	(13)
2010–2012	Valur	21	(2)
2012	AaB	1	(0)
2012–2013	NSÍ	38	(8)
2013–2014	EB/Streymur	13	(2)
2014–	NSÍ	25	(6)

International career^{‡}
2006–2007	Faroe Islands U-19	3	(0)
2008–2010	Faroe Islands U-21	11	(0)
2010–	Faroe Islands	26	(0)
- * Club domestic league appearances and goals as of 16 June 2015 ‡ National team caps and goals as of 26 March 2017

Pól Jóhannus Justinussen (born 13 January 1989) is a Faroese professional footballer who plays for NSÍ Runavík as a midfielder. He previously played for Valur in Iceland and for the Faroese football clubs B68 Toftir, EB/Streymur and GÍ Gøta.

Justinussen made his international debut for the Faroe Islands national football team in 2010. In February 2012, he signed a contract with Danish Superliga club AaB Aalborg until the end of the Danish season in June, having been on trial with the club on two occasions in the months before signing. After his contract expired in the summer he signed with NSÍ Runavík in July. He played there until November 2013, when he joined EB/Streymur. He signed a two-year deal, but eventually re-signed for NSÍ Runavík in 2014.
