= Mikkjal Thomassen =

Faroese footballer

Personal information
- Full name: Mikkjal Kjartansson Thomassen
- Date of birth: 12 January 1976 (age 50)
- Place of birth: Faroe Islands
- Height: 1.85 m (6 ft 1 in)
- Position: Midfielder

Team information
- Current team: HB Tórshavn (head coach)

Senior career*
Years	Team	Apps	(Gls)
1994–1997	HB Tórshavn	54	(19)
1998–2001	B36 Tórshavn	30	(4)
2004	B68 Toftir	10	(0)
2005–2007	B36 Tórshavn	67	(13)
2008	EB/Streymur	13	(0)

International career
2006–2008	Faroe Islands	13	(0)

Managerial career
- 2009–2013: B36 Tórshavn
- 2015–2022: KÍ Klaksvík
- 2022–2024: Fredrikstad
- 2024–2026: AIK
- 2026–: HB Tórshavn
- * Club domestic league appearances and goals

Mikkjal Kjartansson Thomassen (born 12 January 1976) is a Faroese professional football coach and former player who is the head coach of Faroe Islands Premier League club HB Tórshavn. As a player Thomassen earned 13 caps for the Faroe Islands national football team.

== Playing career ==
During his playing career Thomassen represented HB Tórshavn, B36 Tórshavn, B68 Toftir and EB/Streymur.

His last international match was a qualifier for the 2010 FIFA World Cup at home against Austria on 11 August 2008. He was substituted after 37 minutes due to injury, but had the satisfaction of seeing his teammates earning a 1–1 draw.

== Managerial career ==
Thomassen was manager for HB Tórshavn's women's team in 1995, the team won the Faroese championship that season. From 2009 until 2013 he was the manager of B36 Tórshavn. The club won the Faroese championship in 2011 managed by Mikkjal Thomassen and John Petersen.

From 2015 to 2022 Thomassen was the manager of KÍ Klaksvík in the Faroese Premier Division. During this period, he won the Faroese championship in 2019. The club was runner-up in 2016, 2017. In 2016 he won the Faroe Islands Cup with KÍ. In 2020 KÍ won the Faroe Islands Super Cup for the first time.

On 24 September 2020 under the management of Mikkjal Thomassen, KÍ became the first Faroese club to reach the play-offs in Europa League, when they won 6-1 in Tórshavn against the Georgian champions FC Dinamo Tbilisi. It was also the biggest victory for a Faroese club in European tournaments.

On 1 November 2022 he was announced as the manager of Norwegian football club Fredrikstad FK. His first season in charge of FFK proved very successful, as he led the club to promotion to Eliteserien. The 2024 season was the first season in the top flight for Fredrikstad in 11 years.

After a successful stint as manager for Fredrikstad, Thomassen stepped down from his role on 15 July 2024. On July 16 he was announced as the new manager of Swedish Allsvenskan club AIK. Taking over with the club placed 8th in the Allsvenskan, Thomassen led AIK to 3rd by the end of the season, ensuring qualification for the UEFA Conference League in 2025.

== Managerial statistics ==
As of match played 28 February 2025

Managerial record by team and tenure
Team	Nat	From	To	Record							
Team	Nat	From	To	G	W	D	L	GF	GA	GD	Win %
B36 Tórshavn	(Faroe Islands)	1 January 2009	31 December 2014	140	62	37	41	236	192	+44	44.29
KÍ Klaksvík	(Faroe Islands)	1 January 2015	31 December 2022	264	168	50	46	619	242	+377	63.64
Fredrikstad	(Norway)	1 November 2022	15 July 2024	51	30	15	6	95	43	+52	58.82
AIK	(Sweden)	16 July 2024	4 January 2026	20	13	3	4	31	14	+17	65.00
Total				470	270	105	95	981	491	+490	57.45

== Honours ==
Individual

- Norwegian First Division Coach of the Month: August 2023
- Eliteserien Coach of the Month: May 2024
