= Finland national football team results (2020–present) =

- Win Draw Loss

This article provides details of international football games played by the Finland national football team from 2020 to present.

== Results ==
Key
Win
Draw
Defeat

=== 2020 ===
3 September 2020 2020–21 Nations League	Finland	0–1	Wales	Helsinki, Finland
21:45 UTC+3		Report	Moore 80'	Stadium: Helsinki Olympic Stadium; Attendance: 0 (Note: Due to the COVID-19 pandemic in Europe, all matches scheduled for September 2020 were played behind closed doors.); Referee: Daniel Siebert (Germany)

6 September 2020 2020–21 Nations League	Republic of Ireland	0–1	Finland	Dublin, Ireland
17:00		Report	Jensen 64'	Stadium: Aviva Stadium; Attendance: 0 Referee: Fabio Maresca (Italy)

7 October 2020 Friendly	Poland	5–1	Finland	Gdańsk, Poland
20:45	Grosicki 9', 18', 38'; Piątek 53'; Milik 87'	Report	Niskanen 68'	Stadium: Stadion Energa Gdańsk; Attendance: 3,000; Referee: Michal Ocenáš (Slovakia)
Note: The match was originally scheduled for 27 March 2020, but postponed due to the COVID-19 pandemic in Poland.

11 October 2020 2020–21 Nations League	Finland	2–0	Bulgaria	Helsinki, Finland
18:00	Taylor 52'; Jensen 67'	Report		Stadium: Olympic Stadium; Attendance: 6,587; Referee: Erik Lambrechts (Belgium)

14 October 2020 2020–21 Nations League	Finland	1–0	Republic of Ireland	Helsinki, Finland
19:00	Jensen 66'	Report		Stadium: Helsinki Olympic Stadium; Attendance: 0 Referee: Lionel Tschudi (Switzerland)

11 November 2020 Friendly	France	0–2	Finland	Saint-Denis, France
21:10 UTC+1		Report	Forss 28'; Valakari 31'	Stadium: Stade de France; Attendance: 0 Referee: Nikola Popov (Bulgaria)
Note: The match was originally scheduled for 31 March 2020, but postponed due to the COVID-19 pandemic in France.

15 November 2020 2020–21 Nations League	Bulgaria	1–2	Finland	Sofia, Bulgaria
18:00	D. Iliev 68' (pen.)	Report	Pukki 7'; Lod 45+1'	Stadium: Vasil Levski National Stadium; Attendance: 0 Referee: Donatas Rumšas (Lithuania)

18 November 2020 2020–21 Nations League	Wales	3–1	Finland	Cardiff, Wales
19:45 UTC+0	Wilson 29'; James 46'; Moore 84'	Report	Pukki 63'	Stadium: Cardiff City Stadium; Attendance: 0 Referee: Jesús Gil Manzano (Spain)

=== 2021 ===
24 March 2021 2022 World Cup qualification	Finland	2–2	Bosnia and Herzegovina	Helsinki, Finland
21:45	Pukki 58', 77'	Report	Pjanić 55'; Stevanović 84'	Stadium: Helsinki Olympic Stadium; Attendance: 0 Referee: Anastasios Sidiropoulos (Greece)

28 March 2021 2022 World Cup qualification	Ukraine	1–1	Finland	Kyiv, Ukraine
21:45 UTC+3	Moraes 80'	Report	Pukki 89' (pen.)	Stadium: NSK Olimpiyskiy; Attendance: 0 Referee: István Kovács (Romania)

31 March 2021 Friendly	Switzerland	3–2	Finland	St. Gallen, Switzerland
20:45 UTC+2	Gavranović 22'; Vargas 57'; Seferovic 86'	Report	Pohjanpalo 30', 40' (pen.)	Stadium: Kybunpark; Attendance: 0 Referee: Manuel Schüttengruber (Austria)

29 May 2021 Friendly	Sweden	2–0	Finland	Solna, Sweden
18:00 UTC+2	Quaison 23'; Larsson 58' (pen.)	Report		Stadium: Friends Arena; Attendance: 0 Referee: Jakob Kehlet (Denmark)
Note: The match was originally scheduled for 4 June 2020, but postponed due to the COVID-19 pandemic in Sweden.

4 June 2021 Friendly	Finland	0–1	Estonia	Helsinki, Finland
19:00 UTC+2		Report	Sappinen 59' (pen.)	Stadium: Helsinki Olympic Stadium; Attendance: 0 Referee: Jørgen Burchardt (Denmark)

12 June 2021 Euro 2020 Group B	Denmark	0–1	Finland	Copenhagen, Denmark
18:00 UTC+2		Report	Pohjanpalo 60'	Stadium: Parken Stadium; Attendance: 15,200; Referee: Anthony Taylor (England)
Note: In the 43rd minute, the match was suspended after Danish midfielder Christian Eriksen collapsed on the pitch. Eriksen was transferred to a local hospital and stabilised. The match was resumed at 20:30 CEST, with the last four minutes of the first half to be completed prior to a five-minute half-time break.

16 June 2021 Euro 2020 Group B	Finland	0–1	Russia	Saint Petersburg, Russia
16:00 UTC+3		Report	Miranchuk 45+2'	Stadium: Krestovsky Stadium; Attendance: 24,540; Referee: Danny Makkelie (Netherlands)

21 June 2021 Euro 2020 Group B	Finland	0–2	Belgium	Saint Petersburg, Russia
22:00 UTC+3		Report	Hrádecký 74' (o.g.); Lukaku 81'	Stadium: Krestovsky Stadium; Attendance: 18,545; Referee: Felix Brych (Germany)

1 September 2021 Friendly	Finland	0–0	Wales	Helsinki, Finland
19:00 UTC+3		Report		Stadium: Helsinki Olympic Stadium; Attendance: 4,357; Referee: Kristo Tohver (Estonia)

4 September 2021 2022 World Cup qualification	Finland	1–0	Kazakhstan	Helsinki, Finland
19:00 UTC+3	Pohjanpalo 60'	Report		Stadium: Helsinki Olympic Stadium; Attendance: 10,167; Referee: Sergei Ivanov (Russia)

7 September 2021 2022 World Cup qualification	France	2–0	Finland	Lyon, France
20:45 UTC+2	Griezmann 25', 53'	Report		Stadium: Groupama Stadium; Attendance: 57,057; Referee: Deniz Aytekin (Germany)

9 October 2021 2022 World Cup qualification	Finland	1–2	Ukraine	Helsinki, Finland
19:00 UTC+3	Pukki 29'	Report	Yarmolenko 4'; Yaremchuk 34'	Stadium: Helsinki Olympic Stadium; Attendance: 29,485; Referee: Jesús Gil Manzano (Spain)

12 October 2021 2022 World Cup qualification	Kazakhstan	0–2	Finland	Nur-Sultan, Kazakhstan
20:00 UTC+6		Report	Pukki 45', 48'	Stadium: Astana Arena; Attendance: 8,365; Referee: Halis Özkahya (Turkey)

13 November 2021 2022 World Cup qualification	Bosnia and Herzegovina	1–3	Finland	Zenica, Bosnia and Herzegovina
15:00 UTC+1	Menalo 69'	Report	Forss 29'; Lod 51'; O'Shaughnessy 73'	Stadium: Bilino Polje Stadium; Attendance: 10,000; Referee: Michael Oliver (England)

16 November 2021 2022 World Cup qualification	Finland	0–2	France	Helsinki, Finland
21:45 UTC+2		Report	Benzema 66'; Mbappé 76'	Stadium: Helsinki Olympic Stadium; Attendance: 31,890; Referee: Marco Guida (Italy)

=== 2022 ===
26 March 2022 Friendly	Finland	1–1	Iceland	Murcia, Spain
17:00 UTC+1	Pukki 12'	Report	Bjarnason 38'	Stadium: Estadio Nueva Condomina; Attendance: 300; Referee: Fedayi San (Switzerland)

29 March 2022 Friendly	Slovakia	2–0	Finland	Murcia, Spain
18:00 UTC+2	Duda 38'; Jirka 72'	Report		Stadium: Estadio Enrique Roca; Attendance: 1,071; Referee: Espen Eskås (Norway)

4 June 2022 2022–23 Nations League	Finland	1–1	Bosnia and Herzegovina	Helsinki, Finland
19:00 UTC+3	Pukki 45+1' (pen.)	Report	Prevljak 90+3'	Stadium: Helsinki Olympic Stadium; Attendance: 20,181; Referee: Nicholas Walsh (Scotland)

7 June 2022 2022–23 Nations League	Finland	2–0	Montenegro	Helsinki, Finland
19:00 UTC+3	Pohjanpalo 31', 38'	Report		Stadium: Helsinki Olympic Stadium; Attendance: 17,009; Referee: Allard Lindhout (Netherlands)

11 June 2022 2022–23 Nations League	Romania	1–0	Finland	Bucharest, Romania
21:45 UTC+3	Bancu 30'	Report		Stadium: Stadionul Rapid-Giulești; Attendance: 11,503; Referee: Harald Lechner (Austria)

14 June 2022 2022–23 Nations League	Bosnia and Herzegovina	3–2	Finland	Zenica, Bosnia and Herzegovina
20:45 UTC+2	Pjanić 5' (pen.); Džeko 29', 58'	Report	Pukki 10'; Källman 18'	Stadium: Bilino Polje Stadium; Attendance: 8,150; Referee: Georgi Kabakov (Bulgaria)

23 September 2022 2022–23 Nations League	Finland	1–1	Romania	Helsinki, Finland
21:45 UTC+3	Pukki 12'	Report	Tănase 52'	Stadium: Helsinki Olympic Stadium; Attendance: 20,130; Referee: Carlos del Cerro Grande (Spain)

26 September 2022 2022–23 Nations League	Montenegro	0–2	Finland	Podgorica, Montenegro
20:45 UTC+2		Report	Antman 47'; Källman 53'	Stadium: Podgorica City Stadium; Attendance: 2,522; Referee: François Letexier (France)

17 November 2022 Friendly	North Macedonia	1–1	Finland	Skopje, North Macedonia
18:00 UTC+1	Bardhi 75' (pen.)	Report	Antman 37'	Stadium: Toše Proeski Arena; Attendance: 2,000; Referee: Novak Simović (Serbia)

20 November 2022 Friendly	Norway	1–1	Finland	Oslo, Norway
14:00 UTC+1	Sørloth 46'	Report	Källman 32'	Stadium: Ullevaal Stadion; Attendance: 13,347; Referee: Morten Krogh (Denmark)

=== 2023 ===
9 January 2023 Friendly	Sweden	2–0	Finland	Algarve, Portugal
18:45	Nyman 38'; Asoro 90+3'	Report		Stadium: Estadio Algarve; Attendance: 300; Referee: Vítor Ferreira (Portugal)

12 January 2023 Friendly	Finland	0–1	Estonia	Albufeira, Portugal
16:00		Report	Miller 84'	Stadium: Estadio da Nora; Attendance: 300; Referee: Gustavo Correia (Portugal)

23 March 2023 Euro 2024 qualifying	Denmark	3–1	Finland	Copenhagen, Denmark
20:45 UTC+2	Højlund 21', 82', 90+3'	Report	Antman 53'	Stadium: Parken; Attendance: 35,851; Referee: Daniel Siebert (Germany)

26 March 2023 Euro 2024 qualifying	Northern Ireland	0–1	Finland	Belfast, Northern Ireland
19:45 UTC+1		Report	Källman 28'	Stadium: Windsor Park; Attendance: 17,936; Referee: Ivan Kružliak (Slovakia)

16 June 2023 Euro 2024 qualifying	Finland	2–0	Slovenia	Helsinki, Finland
21:45 UTC+3	Pohjanpalo 13'; Antman 64'	Report		Stadium: Helsinki Olympic Stadium; Attendance: 32,560; Referee: Guillermo Cuadra Fernández (Spain)

19 June 2023 Euro 2024 qualifying	Finland	6–0	San Marino	Helsinki, Finland
21:45 UTC+3	Kamara 16'; Källman 39'; Håkans 65', 72', 74'; Pukki 76'	Report		Stadium: Helsinki Olympic Stadium; Attendance: 32,812; Referee: Genc Nuza (Kosovo)

7 September 2023 Euro 2024 qualifying	Kazakhstan	0–1	Finland	Astana, Kazakhstan
20:00 UTC+6		Report	Antman 78'	Stadium: Astana Arena; Attendance: 30,019; Referee: Radu Petrescu (Romania)

10 September 2023 Euro 2024 qualifying	Finland	0–1	Denmark	Helsinki, Finland
19:00 UTC+3		Report	Højbjerg 86'	Stadium: Helsinki Olympic Stadium; Attendance: 32,571; Referee: Szymon Marciniak (Poland)

14 October 2023 Euro 2024 qualifying	Slovenia	3–0	Finland	Ljubljana, Slovenia
18:00 UTC+2	Šeško 16' (pen.), 28'; Janža 90+3'	Report		Stadium: Stožice Stadium; Attendance: 15,823; Referee: Daniele Orsato (Italy)

17 October 2023 Euro 2024 qualifying	Finland	1–2	Kazakhstan	Helsinki, Finland
19:00 UTC+3	Taylor 28'	Report	Zaynutdinov 77' (pen.), 89'	Stadium: Helsinki Olympic Stadium; Attendance: 30,375; Referee: Irfan Peljto (Bosnia and Herzegovina)

17 November 2023 Euro 2024 qualifying	Finland	4–0	Northern Ireland	Helsinki, Finland
19:00 UTC+2	Pohjanpalo 42' (pen.); Håkans 48'; Pukki 74'; Lod 88'	Report		Stadium: Helsinki Olympic Stadium; Attendance: 28,711; Referee: Aliyar Aghayev (Azerbaijan)

20 November 2023 Euro 2024 qualifying	San Marino	1–2	Finland	Serravalle, San Marino
20:45 UTC+1	Berardi 90+7' (pen.)	Report	Soiri 50', 58'	Stadium: Stadio Olimpico de Serravalle; Attendance: 1,427; Referee: Manfredas Lukjančukas (Lithuania)

=== 2024 ===
21 March 2024 Euro 2024 qualifying play-offs	Wales	4–1	Finland	Cardiff, Wales
20:45	Brooks 3'; Williams 38'; Johnson 47'; D. James 86'	Report	Pukki 45'	Stadium: Cardiff City Stadium; Attendance: 32,162; Referee: István Kovács (Romania)

26 March 2024 Friendly	Finland	2–1	Estonia	Helsinki, Finland
17:00	F. Jensen 30'; Hein 38' (o.g.)	Report	Tamm 62'	Stadium: Helsinki Olympic Stadium; Attendance: 12,559; Referee: Mads Kristoffersen (Denmark)

4 June 2024 Friendly	Portugal	4–2	Finland	Lisbon, Portugal
19:45 UTC+1	Dias 17'; Jota 45+4' (pen.); Fernandes 55', 84'	Report	Pukki 73', 77'	Stadium: Estádio José Alvalade; Attendance: 43,125; Referee: Christian-Petru Ciochirca (Austria)

7 June 2024 Friendly	Scotland	2–2	Finland	Glasgow, Scotland
19:45 UTC+1	Hoskonen 54' (o.g.); Shankland 58'	Report	Källman 72'; Antman 85' (pen.)	Stadium: Hampden Park; Attendance: 40,159; Referee: Łukasz Kuźma (Poland)

7 September 2024 2024-25 Nations League	Greece	3–0	Finland	Piraeus, Greece
19:45 UTC+1	Ioannidis 23', 76'; Källman 37' (o.g.)	Report		Stadium: Karaiskakis Stadium; Attendance: 17,293; Referee: Urs Schnyder (Switzerland)

10 September 2024 2024-25 Nations League	England	2–0	Finland	London, England
19:45 UTC+1	Kane 57', 76'	Report		Stadium: Wembley Stadium; Attendance: 17,293; Referee: Morten Krogh (Denmark)

10 October 2024 2024-25 Nations League	Finland	1–2	Republic of Ireland	Helsinki, Finland
19:45 UTC+1	Pohjanpalo 17'	Report	Scales 57'; Brady 88'	Stadium: Helsinki Olympic Stadium; Attendance: 16,105; Referee: Aleksandar Stavrev (North Macedonia)

13 October 2024 2024-25 Nations League	Finland	1–3	England	Helsinki, Finland
17:00 UTC+1	Hoskonen 87'	Report	Grealish 18'; Alexander-Arnold 74'; Rice 84'	Stadium: Helsinki Olympic Stadium; Attendance: 32,411; Referee: Giorgi Kruashvili (Georgia)

14 November 2024 2024-25 Nations League	Republic of Ireland	1–0	Finland	Dublin, Ireland
19:45 UTC+1	Ferguson 45'	Report	Pohjanpalo (penalty missed) 77'	Stadium: Aviva Stadium; Attendance: 39,163; Referee: Aleksandar Stavrev (North Macedonia)

17 November 2024 2024-25 Nations League	Finland	0–2	Greece	Helsinki, Finland
17:00 UTC+1		Report	Bakasetas 52'; Tzolis 56'	Stadium: Helsinki Olympic Stadium; Attendance: 17,661; Referee: Willy Delajod (France)

=== 2025 ===
21 March 2025 2026 World Cup qualification	Malta	0–1	Finland	Ta' Qali, Malta
20:45 UTC+1		Report	Antman 38'	Stadium: National Stadium; Attendance: 5,106; Referee: Simone Sozza (Italy)

24 March 2025 2026 World Cup qualification	Lithuania	2–2	Finland	Kaunas, Lithuania
21:45 UTC+2	Kučys 39'; Gineitis 69'	Report	Kairinen 3'; Pohjanpalo 17' (pen.)	Stadium: Darius and Girenas Stadium; Attendance: 10,421; Referee: Erik Lambrechts (Belgium)

7 June 2025 2026 World Cup qualification	Finland	0–2	Netherlands	Helsinki, Finland
21:45 UTC+3		Report	Depay 6'; Dumfries 23'	Stadium: Helsinki Olympic Stadium; Attendance: 29,483; Referee: Daniel Siebert (Germany)

10 June 2025 2026 World Cup qualification	Finland	2–1	Poland	Helsinki, Finland
21:45 UTC+3	Pohjanpalo 31' (pen.); Källman 64'	Report	Kiwior 69'	Stadium: Helsinki Olympic Stadium; Attendance: 16,511; Referee: João Pinheiro (Portugal)

4 September 2025 Friendly	Norway	1–0	Finland	Oslo, Norway
18:00 UTC+2	Haaland 17' (pen.)	Report		Stadium: Ullevaal Stadion; Attendance: 18,665; Referee: Rob Hennessy (Ireland)

7 September 2025 2026 World Cup qualification	Poland	3–1	Finland	Chorzów, Poland
20:45 UTC+2	Cash 27'; Lewandowski 45+2'; Kamiński 54'	Report	Källman 88'	Stadium: Silesian Stadium; Attendance: 50,897; Referee: Rade Obrenović (Slovenia)

9 October 2025 2026 World Cup qualification	Finland	2–1	Lithuania	Helsinki, Finland
21:45 UTC+3	Källman 48'; Markhiyev 55'	Report	Širvys 25'	Stadium: Helsinki Olympic Stadium; Attendance: 15,819; Referee: Stéphanie Frappart (France)

12 October 2025 2026 World Cup qualification	Netherlands	4–0	Finland	Amsterdam, Netherlands
18:00 UTC+2	Malen 8'; van Dijk 17'; Depay 38' (pen.); Gakpo 84'	Report		Stadium: Johan Cruyff Arena; Attendance: 52,387; Referee: Slavko Vinčić (Slovenia)

14 November 2025 2026 World Cup qualification	Finland	0–1	Malta	Helsinki, Finland
19:00 UTC+2		Report	Grech 81'	Stadium: Helsinki Olympic Stadium; Attendance: 13,577; Referee: Julian Weinberger (Austria)

17 November 2025 Friendly	Finland	4–0	Andorra	Tampere, Finland
19:00 UTC+2	Antman 18'; Pukki 26'; Pyyhtiä 68'; Walta 90+2'	Report		Stadium: Tammelan stadion Attendance: 5,500; Referee: Joonas Jaanovits (Estonia)

=== 2026 ===
27 March 2026 2026 FIFA Series	New Zealand	0–2	Finland	Auckland, New Zealand
19:00 UTC+13		Report	Pohjanpalo 25'; Oksanen 85'	Stadium: Eden Park; Attendance: 17,603; Referee: Casey Reibelt (Australia)

30 March 2026 2026 FIFA Series	Cape Verde	1–1 (4–2 p)	Finland	Auckland, New Zealand
16:00 UTC+13	Pires 67'	Report	Skyttä 45+4'	Stadium: Eden Park; Attendance: 2,060; Referee: Anna-Marie Keighley (New Zealand)
	Penalties
	S. Cabral (penalty scored); J. Cabral (penalty missed); Pina (penalty scored); da Costa (penalty scored); Mendes (penalty scored)		(penalty scored) Walta; (penalty scored) Valakari; (penalty missed) Keskinen; (penalty missed) Oksanen

31 May 2026 Friendly	Germany	4–0	Finland	Mainz, Germany
20:45 UTC+2	Undav 34', 57'; Wirtz 48'; Musiala 63'	Report		Stadium: Mewa Arena; Attendance: 25,122; Referee: Matheus Candançan (Brazil)

5 June 2026 Friendly	Hungary	2–1	Finland	Budapest, Hungary
20:45 UTC+2	Varga 26', 43'	Report	T. Miettinen 71'	Stadium: Puskás Aréna; Attendance: 53,148; Referee: Ante Čulina (Croatia)

26 September 2026 2026–27 Nations League	San Marino	0–7	Finland	Serravalle, San Marino
18:00 UTC+2		Report	Pohjanpalo 5', 79', 88' (pen.); Svanbäck 14'; Källman 33'; Walta 50', 55'	Stadium: San Marino Stadium; Attendance: 1,148; Referee: Nathan Verboomen (Belgium)

29 September 2026 2026–27 Nations League	Finland	0–0	Belarus	Helsinki, Finland
21:45 UTC+3		Report		Stadium: Helsinki Olympic Stadium; Attendance: 7,262; Referee: Nikola Dabanović (Montenegro)

3 October 2026 2026–27 Nations League	Finland	2–1	Albania	Helsinki, Finland
16:00 UTC+3	Walta 26', 71'	Report	Manaj 4'	Stadium: Helsinki Olympic Stadium; Attendance: 24,885; Referee: Rob Hennessy (Ireland)

6 October 2026 2026–27 Nations League	Belarus	1–0	Finland	Budapest, Hungary (Note: Due to Belarusian involvement in the Russian invasion of Ukraine, Belarus are required to play their home matches at neutral venues, and behind closed doors, until further notice."Belarus teams to play on neutral ground in UEFA competitions". UEFA. Union of European Football Associations. 3 March 2022.)
21:45 UTC+3	Shumansky 1'	Report		Stadium: Illovszky Rudolf Stadion; Attendance: 0 Referee: Sascha Stegemann (Germany)

12 November 2026 2026–27 Nations League	Albania	2–0	Finland	Tirana, Albania
20:45 UTC+1	Muçi 35'; Manaj 50'	Report		Stadium: Arena Kombëtare; Attendance: 20,942; Referee: João Pinheiro (Portugal)

15 November 2026 2026–27 Nations League	Finland	7–2	San Marino	Helsinki, Finland
19:00 UTC+2	Svanbäck 8', 20', 78'; Walta 17'; Pohjanpalo 36', 42'; Håkans 70'	Report	Nanni 26' (pen.), 76'	Stadium: Bolt Arena; Attendance: 7,153; Referee: Georgi Kabakov (Bulgaria)
