= Slovakia national football team results (2020–present) =

This article provides details of international football games played by the Slovakia national football team from 2020 to present.

== Results ==
Key
| Win |
| Draw |
| Defeat |

=== 2020 ===
| 2 June 2020 Friendly | Norway | Cancelled | Slovakia | Oslo, Norway |

| 4 September 2020 2020–21 Nations League | Slovakia | 1–3 | Czech Republic | Bratislava, Slovakia |
| 20:45 UTC+2 | Schranz 88' | Report | Coufal 48'; Dočkal 53' (pen.); Krmenčík 86' | Stadium: Tehelné pole Attendance: 0 (Note: Due to the COVID-19 pandemic in Europe, all matches scheduled for September 2020 were played behind closed doors.); Referee: Andris Treimanis (Latvia) |

| 7 September 2020 2020–21 Nations League | Israel | 1–1 | Slovakia | Netanya, Israel |
| 20:45 UTC+3 | Elmkies 90+1' | Report | Ďuriš 14' | Stadium: Netanya Stadium; Attendance: 0 Referee: Nikola Dabanović (Montenegro) |

| 8 October 2020 Euro 2020 qualifying play-offs | Slovakia | 0–0 (a.e.t.) (4–2 p) | Republic of Ireland | Bratislava, Slovakia |
| 20:45 UTC+2 | | Report | | Stadium: Tehelné pole Attendance: 0 (Note: The Slovakia v Republic of Ireland match was played behind closed doors due to the COVID-19 pandemic in Slovakia.); Referee: Clément Turpin (France) |
| | Penalties |
| | Hamšík (penalty scored); Hrošovský (penalty scored); Haraslín (penalty scored); Greguš (penalty scored) | | (penalty scored) Hourihane; (penalty scored) Brady; (penalty missed) Browne; (penalty missed) Doherty |

| 11 October 2020 2020–21 Nations League | Scotland | 1–0 | Slovakia | Glasgow, Scotland |
| 20:45 UTC+1 | Dykes 54' | Report | | Stadium: Hampden Park; Attendance: 0 Referee: Davide Massa (Italy) |

| 14 October 2020 2020–21 Nations League | Slovakia | 2–3 | Israel | Trnava, Slovakia |
| 20:45 UTC+2 | Hamšík 16'; Mak 38' | Report | Zahavi 68', 76', 89' | Stadium: Anton Malatinský Stadium; Attendance: 0 Referee: Alejandro Hernández Hernández (Spain) |

| 12 November 2020 Euro 2020 qualifying play-offs | Northern Ireland | 1–2 (a.e.t.) | Slovakia | Belfast, Northern Ireland |
| 19:45 UTC+0 | Škriniar 88' (o.g.) | Report | Kucka 17'; Ďuriš 110' | Stadium: Windsor Park; Attendance: 0 Referee: Felix Brych (Germany) |

| 15 November 2020 2020–21 Nations League | Slovakia | 1–0 | Scotland | Trnava, Slovakia |
| 15:00 UTC+1 | Greguš 32' | Report | | Stadium: Anton Malatinský Stadium; Attendance: 0 Referee: István Kovács (Romania) |

| 18 November 2020 2020–21 Nations League | Czech Republic | 2–0 | Slovakia | Prague, Czech Republic |
| 20:45 UTC+1 | Souček 17'; Ondrášek 55' | Report | | Stadium: Sinobo Stadium; Attendance: 0 Referee: Cüneyt Çakır (Turkey) |

=== 2021 ===
| 24 March 2021 2022 World Cup qualification | Cyprus | 0–0 | Slovakia | Nicosia, Cyprus |
| 21:45 UTC+2 | | Report | | Stadium: GSP Stadium; Attendance: 0 Referee: Aleksandar Stavrev (North Macedonia) |

| 27 March 2021 2022 World Cup qualification | Slovakia | 2–2 | Malta | Trnava, Slovakia |
| 20:45 UTC+2 | Strelec 49'; Škriniar 53' | Report | Gambin 16'; Satariano 20' | Stadium: Štadión Antona Malatinského; Attendance: 0 Referee: Harald Lechner (Austria) |

| 30 March 2021 2022 World Cup qualification | Slovakia | 2–1 | Russia | Trnava, Slovakia |
| 20:45 UTC+2 | Škriniar 38'; Mak 74' | Report | Fernandes 71' | Stadium: Anton Malatinský Stadium; Attendance: 0 Referee: Carlos del Cerro Grande (Spain) |

| 1 June 2021 Friendly | Slovakia | 1–1 | Bulgaria | Ried im Innkreis, Austria |
| 18:00 UTC+2 | Bénes 27' | Report | A. Iliev 9' | Stadium: Keine Sorgen Arena; Attendance: 0 Referee: Walter Altmann (Austria) |

| 6 June 2021 Friendly | Austria | 0–0 | Slovakia | Vienna, Austria |
| 17:30 UTC+2 | | Report | | Stadium: Ernst Happel Stadion; Attendance: 0 Referee: Urs Schnyder (Switzerland) |

| 14 June 2021 Euro 2020 Group E | Poland | 1–2 | Slovakia | Dublin, Republic of Ireland |
| 18:00 UTC+2 | Linetty 46' | Report | Szczęsny 18' (o.g.); Škriniar 69' | Stadium: Aviva Stadium; Attendance: 12,862; Referee: Ovidiu Hațegan (Romania) |

| 18 June 2021 Euro 2020 Group E | Sweden | 1–0 | Slovakia | Dublin, Republic of Ireland |
| 14:00 UTC+1 | Forsberg 77' (pen.) | Report | | Stadium: Aviva Stadium; Attendance: 11,525; Referee: Daniel Siebert (Germany) |

| 23 June 2021 Euro 2020 Group E | Slovakia | 0–5 | Spain | Seville, Spain |
| 18:00 UTC+2 | | Report | Dúbravka 30' (o.g.); Laporte 45+3'; Sarabia 56'; F. Torres 67'; Kucka 71' (o.g.) | Stadium: La Cartuja; Attendance: 11,204; Referee: Björn Kuipers (Netherlands) |

| 1 September 2021 2022 World Cup qualification | Slovenia | 1–1 | Slovakia | Ljubljana, Slovenia |
| 20:45 UTC+2 | Stojanović 42' | Report | Boženík 32' | Stadium: Stožice Stadium; Attendance: 4,034; Referee: István Kovács (Romania) |

| 4 September 2021 2022 World Cup qualification | Slovakia | 0–1 | Croatia | Bratislava, Slovakia |
| 20:45 UTC+2 | | Report | Brozović 86' | Stadium: Tehelné pole Attendance: 9,047; Referee: Bartosz Frankowski (Poland) |

| 7 September 2021 2022 World Cup qualification | Slovakia | 2–0 | Cyprus | Bratislava, Slovakia |
| 20:45 UTC+2 | Schranz 55'; Koscelník 77' | Report | | Stadium: Tehelné pole Attendance: 6,762; Referee: Aliyar Aghayev (Azerbaijan) |

| 8 October 2021 2022 World Cup qualification | Russia | 1–0 | Slovakia | Kazan, Russia |
| 21:45 UTC+3 | Škriniar 24' (o.g.) | Report | | Stadium: Ak Bars Arena; Attendance: 9,588; Referee: Antonio Mateu Lahoz (Spain) |

| 11 October 2021 2022 World Cup qualification | Croatia | 2–2 | Slovakia | Osijek, Croatia |
| 20:45 UTC+2 | Kramarić 25'; Modrić 71' | Report | Schranz 20'; Haraslín 45+1' | Stadium: Gradski Vrt Stadium; Attendance: 9,926; Referee: Ovidiu Hațegan (Romania) |

| 11 November 2021 2022 World Cup qualification | Slovakia | 2–2 | Slovenia | Trnava, Slovakia |
| 20:45 UTC+1 | Duda 58' (pen.); Strelec 74' | Report | Zajc 18'; Mevlja 62' | Stadium: Anton Malatinský Stadium; Attendance: 2,726; Referee: Mattias Gestranius (Finland) |

| 14 November 2021 2022 World Cup qualification | Malta | 0–6 | Slovakia | Ta' Qali, Malta |
| 15:00 UTC+1 | | Report | Rusnák 6', 16'; Duda 8', 69', 80'; De Marco 72' | Stadium: National Stadium; Attendance: 3,293; Referee: Fran Jović (Croatia) |

=== 2022 ===
| 25 March 2022 Friendly | Norway | 2–0 | Slovakia | Oslo, Norway |
| 18:00 UTC+1 | Haaland 74'; Ødegaard 80' | Report | | Stadium: Ullevaal Stadion; Attendance: 11,048; Referee: Mattias Gestranius (Finland) |

| 29 March 2022 Friendly | Slovakia | 2–0 | Finland | Murcia, Spain |
| 18:00 UTC+2 | Duda 38'; Jirka 72' | Report | | Stadium: Estadio Enrique Roca; Attendance: 1,071; Referee: Espen Eskås (Norway) |

| 3 June 2022 2022–23 Nations League | Belarus | 0–1 | Slovakia | Novi Sad, Serbia |
| 20:45 UTC+2 | | Report | Suslov 61' | Stadium: Karađorđe Stadium; Attendance: 0 Referee: Stéphanie Frappart (France) |

| 6 June 2022 2022–23 Nations League | Slovakia | 0–1 | Kazakhstan | Trnava, Slovakia |
| 20:45 UTC+2 | | Report | Darabayev 26' | Stadium: Anton Malatinský Stadium; Attendance: 4,146; Referee: Kristo Tohver (Estonia) |

| 10 June 2022 2022–23 Nations League | Azerbaijan | 0–1 | Slovakia | Mərdəkan, Azerbaijan |
| 20:00 UTC+2 | | Report | Weiss 81' | Stadium: Dalga Arena; Attendance: 2,967; Referee: Donatas Rumšas (Lithuania) |

| 13 June 2022 2022–23 Nations League | Kazakhstan | 2–1 | Slovakia | Nur-Sultan, Kazakhstan |
| 20:00 UTC+2 | Vorogovsky 18'; Astanov 39' | Report | Bero 51' | Stadium: Astana Arena; Attendance: 28,745; Referee: Bram Van Driessche (Belgium) |

| 22 September 2022 2022–23 Nations League | Slovakia | 1–2 | Azerbaijan | Trnava, Slovakia |
| 20:45 UTC+2 | Jirka 90+3' (pen.) | Report | Dadashov 44'; Haghverdi 90+5' | Stadium: Anton Malatinský Stadium; Attendance: 2,875; Referee: Willie Collum (Scotland) |

| 25 September 2022 2022–23 Nations League | Slovakia | 1–1 | Belarus | Bačka Topola, Serbia (Note: Due to the country's involvement in the Russian invasion of Ukraine, Belarus were not allowed to enter Slovakia by local authorities. As a result, the match was played at a neutral venue.) |
| 18:00 UTC+2 | Zreľák 65' | Report | Bakhar 45' | Stadium: TSC Arena; Attendance: 524; Referee: Nikola Dabanović (Montenegro) |

| 17 November 2022 Friendly | Montenegro | 2–2 | Slovakia | Podgorica, Montenegro |
| 18:00 UTC+1 | Savić 76', 90+7' (pen.) | Report | Hancko 15'; Kucka 47' | Stadium: Podgorica City Stadium; Attendance: 1,109; Referee: Irfan Peljto (Bosnia and Herzegovina) |

| 20 November 2022 Friendly | Slovakia | 0–0 | Chile | Bratislava, Slovakia |
| 13:30 UTC+1 | | Report | | Stadium: Tehelné pole Attendance: 19,757; Referee: Ondřej Berka (Czech Republic) |

=== 2023 ===
| 23 March 2023 Euro 2024 qualifying | Slovakia | 0–0 | Luxembourg | Trnava, Slovakia |
| 20:45 | | Report | | Stadium: Štadión Antona Malatinského; Attendance: 3,523; Referee: Rade Obrenovič (Slovenia) |

| 26 March 2023 Euro 2024 qualifying | Slovakia | 2–0 | Bosnia and Herzegovina | Bratislava, Slovakia |
| 20:45 | Mak 13'; Haraslín 40' | Report | | Stadium: Tehelné Pole; Attendance: 6,052; Referee: Marco Di Bello (Italy) |

| 17 June 2023 Euro 2024 qualifying | Iceland | 1–2 | Slovakia | Reykjavík, Iceland |
| 20:45 (18:45 UTC±0) | Finnbogason 41' (pen.) | Report | 27' Kucka; 69' Suslov | Stadium: Laugardalsvöllur; Attendance: 7,555; Referee: Don Robertson (Scotland) |

| 20 June 2023 Euro 2024 qualifying | Liechtenstein | 0–1 | Slovakia | Vaduz, Liechtenstein |
| 20:45 | | Report | 45+1' Vavro | Stadium: Rheinpark Stadion; Attendance: 2,316; Referee: Yigal Frid (Israel) |

| 8 September 2023 Euro 2024 qualifying | Slovakia | 0–1 | Portugal | Bratislava, Slovakia |
| 20:45 | | Report | 43' Fernandes | Stadium: Tehelné Pole; Attendance: 21,473; Referee: Glenn Nyberg (Sweden) |

| 11 September 2023 Euro 2024 qualifying | Slovakia | 3–0 | Liechtenstein | Bratislava, Slovakia |
| 20:45 | Hancko 1'; Duda 3'; Mak 6' | Report | | Stadium: Tehelné Pole; Attendance: 13,679; Referee: Sander van der Eijk (Netherlands) |

| 13 October 2023 Euro 2024 qualifying | Portugal | 3–2 | Slovakia | Porto, Portugal |
| 20:45 (19:45 UTC+1) | Ramos 18'; Ronaldo 29' (pen.), 72' | Report | 69' Hancko; 80' Lobotka | Stadium: Estádio do Dragão; Attendance: 46,601; Referee: Anastasios Sidiropoulos (Greece) |

| 16 October 2023 Euro 2024 qualifying | Luxembourg | 0–1 | Slovakia | Luxembourg, Luxembourg |
| 20:45 | | Report | 77' Ďuriš | Stadium: Stade de Luxembourg; Attendance: 9,386; Referee: José María Sánchez Martínez (Spain) |

| 16 November 2023 Euro 2024 qualifying | Slovakia | 4–2 | Iceland | Bratislava, Slovakia |
| 20:45 | Kucka 30'; Duda 36' (pen.); Haraslín 47', 55' | Report | Óskarsson 17'; Guðjohnsen 74' | Stadium: Tehelné Pole; Attendance: 21,548; Referee: Craig Pawson (England) |

| 19 November 2023 Euro 2024 qualifying | Bosnia and Herzegovina | 1–2 | Slovakia | Zenica, Bosnia and Herzegovina |
| 20:45 | Hrošovský 49' (o.g.); Gojković (red card) 63' | Report | Boženík 52'; Šatka 71' | Stadium: Bilino Polje; Attendance: 3,800; Referee: Julian Weinberger (Austria) |

=== 2024 ===
| 23 March 2024 Friendly | Slovakia | 0–2 | Austria | Bratislava, Slovakia |
| 18:00 | | Report | Baumgartner 1'; Weimann 82' | Stadium: Tehelné pole Attendance: 28,000; Referee: Trustin Farrugia Cann (Malta) |

| 26 March 2024 Friendly | Norway | 1–1 | Slovakia | Oslo, Norway |
| 18:00 UTC+1 | Sørloth 18'; Haaland (penalty missed) 52' | Report | Duda 87' | Stadium: Ullevaal Stadion; Attendance: 9,099; Referee: Giorgi Kruashvili (Georgia) |

| 5 June 2024 Friendly | Slovakia | 4–0 | San Marino | Vienna, Austria |
| 17:00 | Rigo 6'; Suslov 10'; Haraslín 36'; Strelec 58' | Report | | Stadium: Wiener Neustadt Arena; Attendance: 452; Referee: Julian Weinberger (Austria) |

| 9 June 2024 Friendly | Slovakia | 4–0 | Wales | Trnava, Slovakia |
| 20:45 | Kucka 45'; Boženík 56'; Ampadu 60' (o.g.); Bénes 90' | Report | | Stadium: Anton Malatinský Stadium; Attendance: 6,348; Referee: Daniel Stefański (Poland) |

| 17 June 2024 Euro 2024 Group E | Belgium | 0–1 | Slovakia | Frankfurt, Germany |
| 18:00 | | Report | Schranz 7' | Stadium: Waldstadion; Attendance: 45,181; Referee: Halil Umut Meler (Turkey) |

| 21 June 2024 Euro 2024 Group E | Slovakia | 1–2 | Ukraine | Düsseldorf, Germany |
| 15:00 | Schranz 17' | Report | Shaparenko 54'; Yaremchuk 80' | Stadium: Merkur Spiel-Arena; Attendance: 43,910; Referee: Michael Oliver (England) |

| 26 June 2024 Euro 2024 Group E | Slovakia | 1–1 | Romania | Frankfurt, Germany |
| 18:00 | Duda 24' | Report | Marin 37' (pen.) | Stadium: Waldstadion; Attendance: 45,033; Referee: Daniel Siebert (Germany) |

| 30 June 2024 Euro 2024 Round of 16 | England | 2–1 (a.e.t.) | Slovakia | Gelsenkirchen, Germany |
| 18:00 CEST (UTC+2) | Bellingham 90+5'; Kane 91' | Report | Schranz 25' | Stadium: Veltins-Arena; Attendance: 47,244; Referee: Halil Umut Meler (Turkey) |

| 5 September 2024 2024–25 Nations League | Estonia | 0–1 | Slovakia | Tallinn, Estonia |
| 21:45 UTC+3 | | Report | 70' Suslov | Stadium: Lilleküla Stadium; Attendance: 6,128; Referee: Matej Jug (Slovenia) |

| 8 September 2024 2024–25 Nations League | Slovakia | 2–0 | Azerbaijan | Košice, Slovakia |
| 18:00 UTC+2 | Duda 22' (pen.); Strelec 26' | Report | | Stadium: Košická futbalová aréna Attendance: 11,435; Referee: Damian Sylwestrzak (Poland) |

| 11 October 2024 2024–25 Nations League | Slovakia | 2–2 | Sweden | Bratislava, Slovakia |
| 20:45 UTC+2 | Strelec 44', 72' | Report | 25' Ayari; 32' Sema | Stadium: Tehelné pole Attendance: 15,381; Referee: Maurizio Mariani (Italy) |

| 14 October 2024 2024–25 Nations League | Azerbaijan | 1–3 | Slovakia | Baku, Azerbaijan |
| 20:00 UTC+4 | Bayramov 38' | Report | 15' (o.g.) Mammadov; 75' Haraslín; 87' Ďuriš | Stadium: Tofiq Bahramov Republican Stadium; Attendance: 4,269; Referee: Rohit Saggi (Norway) |

| 16 November 2024 2024–25 Nations League | Sweden | 2–1 | Slovakia | Solna, Sweden |
| 20:45 UTC+1 | Gyökeres 3'; Isak 48' | Report | 19' Hancko | Stadium: Friends Arena; Attendance: 36,417; Referee: Mykola Balakin (Ukraine) |

| 19 November 2024 2024–25 Nations League | Slovakia | 1–0 | Estonia | Trnava, Slovakia |
| 20:45 UTC+1 | Strelec 72' | Report | | Stadium: Štadión Antona Malatinského; Attendance: 4,317; Referee: Mikkel Redder (Denmark) |

=== 2025 ===
| 20 March 2025 2024–25 Nations League promotion play-off | Slovakia | 0–0 | Slovenia | Bratislava, Slovakia |
| 20:45 UTC+1 | | Report | | Stadium: Tehelné pole Attendance: 12,545; Referee: Maurizio Mariani (Italy) |

| 23 March 2025 2024–25 Nations League promotion play-off | Slovenia | 1–0 (a.e.t.) (1–0 agg.) | Slovakia | Ljubljana, Slovenia |
| 20:45 UTC+1 | Gnezda Čerin 95' | Report | | Stadium: Stožice Stadium; Attendance: 14,076; Referee: István Kovács (Romania) |

| 7 June 2025 Friendly | Greece | 4–1 | Slovakia | Heraklion, Greece |
| 21:45 UTC+3 | Konstantelias 16'; Pavlidis 66'; Douvikas 88'; Hrnčár 90+2' (o.g.) | Report | Hancko 34' | Stadium: Pankritio Stadium; Attendance: 18,930; Referee: Harm Osmers (Germany) |

| 10 June 2025 Friendly | Israel | 1–0 | Slovakia | Debrecen, Hungary |
| 20:45 UTC+2 | Shua 47' | Report | | Stadium: Nagyerdei Stadion; Referee: Matteo Marchetti (Italy) |

| 4 September 2025 2026 World Cup qualification | Slovakia | 2–0 | Germany | Bratislava, Slovakia |
| 20:45 UTC+2 | Hancko 42'; Strelec 55' | Report | | Stadium: Tehelné pole Attendance: 20,013; Referee: Serdar Gözübüyük (Netherlands) |

| 7 September 2025 2026 World Cup qualification | Luxembourg | 0–1 | Slovakia | Luxembourg City, Luxembourg |
| 20:45 UTC+2 | | Report | Rigo 90' | Stadium: Stade de Luxembourg; Attendance: 8,487; Referee: Nicholas Walsh (Scotland) |

| 10 October 2025 2026 World Cup qualification | Northern Ireland | 2–0 | Slovakia | Belfast, Northern Ireland |
| 20:45 UTC+2 | Hrošovský 18' (o.g.); Hume 81' | Report | | Stadium: Windsor Park; Attendance: 18,109; Referee: Glenn Nyberg (Sweden) |

| 13 October 2025 2026 World Cup qualification | Slovakia | 2–0 | Luxembourg | Trnava, Slovakia |
| 20:45 UTC+1 | Obert 55'; Schranz 72' | Report | | Stadium: Anton Malatinský Stadium; Attendance: 13,010; Referee: Rade Obrenović (Slovenia) |

| 14 November 2025 2026 World Cup qualification | Slovakia | 1–0 | Northern Ireland | Košice, Slovakia |
| 20:45 UTC+2 | Bobček 90+1' | Report | | Stadium: Košická futbalová aréna Attendance: 12,093; Referee: István Kovács (Romania) |

| 17 November 2025 2026 World Cup qualification | Germany | 6–0 | Slovakia | Leipzig, Germany |
| 20:45 UTC+1 | Woltemade 18'; Gnabry 29'; Sané 36', 41'; Baku 67'; Ouédraogo 79' | Report | | Stadium: Red Bull Arena; Attendance: 40,120; Referee: François Letexier (France) |

=== 2026 ===
| 26 March 2026 2026 World Cup qualification play-offs | Slovakia | 3–4 | Kosovo | Bratislava, Slovakia |
| 20:45 UTC+1 | Valjent 6'; Haraslín 45'; Strelec 90+4' | Report | Hodža 21'; Asllani 47'; Muslija 60'; Hajrizi 72' | Stadium: Tehelné pole Attendance: 20,113; Referee: Espen Eskås (Norway) |

| 31 March 2026 Friendly | Slovakia | 2–0 | Romania | Bratislava, Slovakia |
| 20:45 UTC+2 | Birligea 7' (o.g.); Strelec 46' | Report | | Stadium: Tehelné pole Attendance: 8,043; Referee: Ondrej Berka (Czech Republic) |

| 1 June 2026 Friendly | Slovakia | 2–1 | Malta | Dunajská Streda, Slovakia |
| 18:00 UTC+2 | Haraslín 9'; Galčík 90+7' | Report | Mbong 37' | Stadium: MOL Aréna; Attendance: 5,721; Referee: Mihály Káprály (Hungary) |

| 5 June 2026 Friendly | Slovakia | 2–2 | Montenegro | Košice, Slovakia |
| 18:30 UTC+2 | Boženík 6'; Duda 74' | Report | Osmajić 44', 66' (pen.) | Stadium: Košická futbalová aréna Attendance: 10,432; Referee: Wojciech Myć (Poland) |

| 26 September 2026 2026–27 Nations League | Slovakia | 2–0 | Moldova | Prešov, Slovakia |
| 20:45 UTC+2 | Schranz 32'; Duda 40' (pen.) | Report | | Stadium: Tatran Stadium; Attendance: 6,003; Referee: Juxhin Xhaja (Albania) |

| 29 September 2026 2026–27 Nations League | Slovakia | 2–1 | Kazakhstan | Košice, Slovakia |
| 20:45 UTC+2 | Sauer 26'; Hancko 82' | Report | Karimov 35' | Stadium: Košická futbalová aréna Attendance: 9,109; Referee: Patrik Kolarić (Croatia) |

| 2 October 2026 2026–27 Nations League | Faroe Islands | 1–1 | Slovakia | Tórshavn, Faroe Islands |
| 19:45 UTC+1 | Justinussen 66' | Report | Vatnhamar 38' (o.g.) | Stadium: Tórsvøllur; Attendance: 2,853; Referee: Mohammed Al-Hakim (Sweden) |

| 6 October 2026 2026–27 Nations League | Moldova | 0–4 | Slovakia | Chișinău, Moldova |
| 21:45 UTC+3 | | Report | Strelec 8'; Suslov 44'; Hancko 60'; Haraslín 75' | Stadium: Stadionul Zimbru; Attendance: 5,942; Referee: Yigal Frid (Israel) |

| 13 November 2026 2026–27 Nations League | Slovakia | 2–2 | Faroe Islands | Košice, Slovakia |
| 20:45 UTC+1 | Prekop 17'; Haraslín 74' | Report | Davidsen 30'; Samuelsen 47' (pen.) | Stadium: Košická futbalová aréna Attendance: 11,013; Referee: Mohammad Al-Emara (Finland) |

| 16 November 2026 2026–27 Nations League | Kazakhstan | 2–2 | Slovakia | Astana, Kazakhstan |
| 20:00 UTC+5 | Chesnokov 29'; Vorogovsky 65' | Report | Boženík 56'; Kaprálik 90+5' | Stadium: Astana Arena; Attendance: 13,244; Referee: Aliyar Aghayev (Azerbaijan) |
