= Hoskonen =

Hoskonen is a Finnish surname. Notable people with the surname include:

- Arttu Hoskonen (born 1997), Finnish footballer;
- Hannu Hoskonen (born 1957), Finnish politician.

== See also ==
- Honkonen
