= Honkonen =

Honkonen is a Finnish surname. Notable people with the surname include:

- Kuuno Honkonen (1922–1985), Finnish high jumper and politician
- Hannu Honkonen (born 1982), Finnish composer, music producer and musician
- Petri Honkonen (born 1987), Finnish politician
