= Leo Walta =

Finnish footballer (born 2003)

- Walta with Los Angeles FC in 2026

Personal information
- Full name: Leo Eemil Walta
- Date of birth: 24 June 2003 (age 23)
- Place of birth: Vantaa, Finland
- Height: 1.70 m (5 ft 7 in)
- Position: Midfielder

Team information
- Current team: Los Angeles FC (on loan from Swansea City)
- Number: 81

Youth career
- Pakkalan Palloseura
- –2019: HJK
- 2019–2021: Nordsjælland

Senior career*
Years	Team	Apps	(Gls)
2019	Klubi 04	6	(0)
2021–2024	Nordsjælland	19	(0)
2023	→ HB Køge (loan)	14	(3)
2023	→ Mjällby (loan)	11	(2)
2024–2026	Sirius	59	(23)
2026	→ Swansea City (loan)	10	(1)
2026–	Swansea City	1	(0)
2026–	→ Los Angeles FC (loan)	4	(2)

International career^{‡}
2018	Finland U15		
2019	Finland U16	3	(1)
2019–2020	Finland U17	12	(3)
2022	Finland U19	3	(0)
2021–2025	Finland U21	14	(2)
2024–	Finland	20	(6)
- * Club domestic league appearances and goals as of 26 October 2026 ‡ National team caps and goals as of 15 November 2026

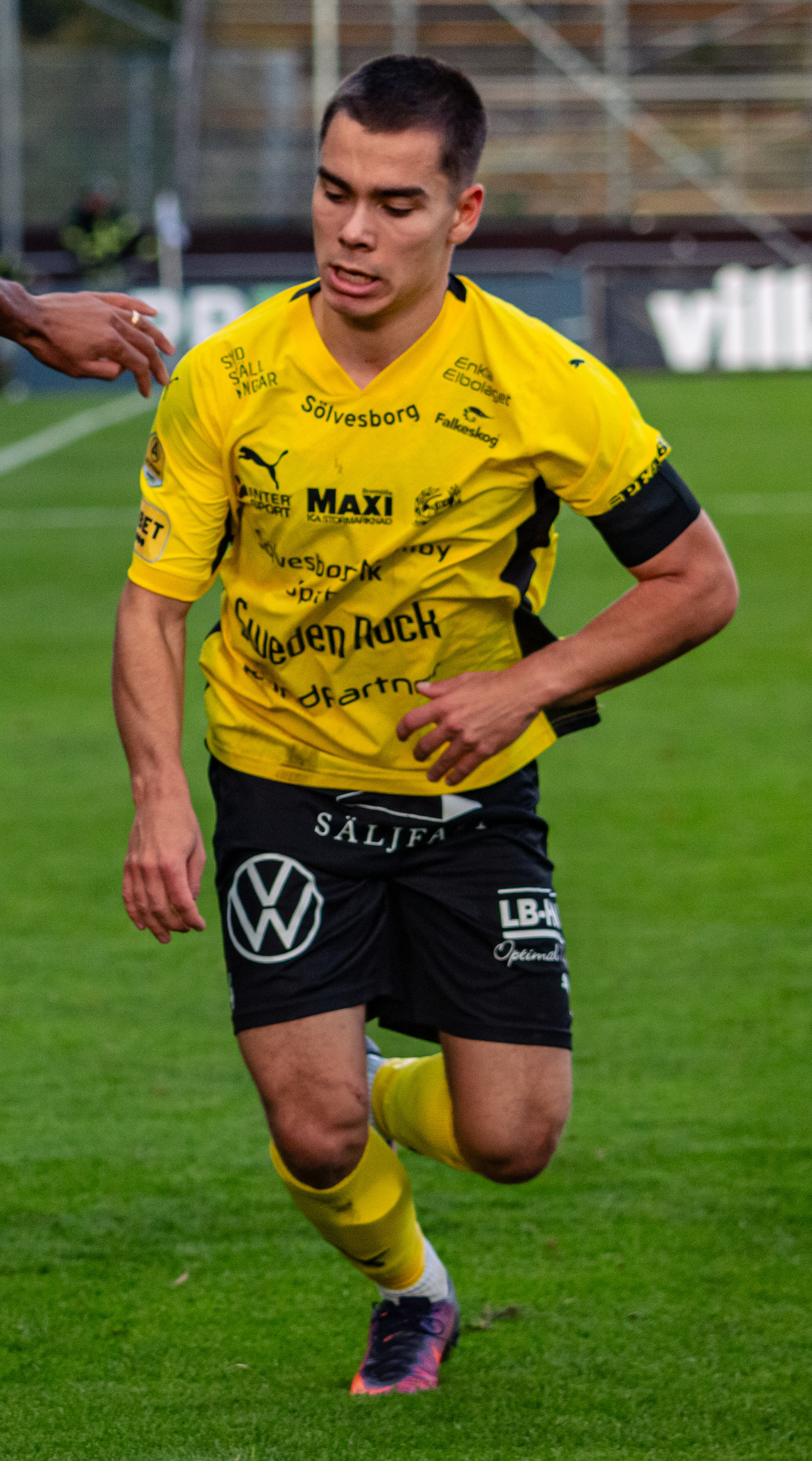
Walta with Mjällby in 2023

Leo Eemil Walta (born 24 June 2003) is a Finnish professional footballer who plays as a midfielder for Major League Soccer club Los Angeles FC, on loan from EFL Championship club Swansea City, and the Finland national team.

== Club career ==
Walta's first football club was Pakkalan Palloseura of Pakkala, Vantaa, where he played his first youth years.

=== HJK Helsinki ===
Walta joined HJK Helsinki youth sector when he was eight years old. Walta was a very attractive player during his youth years at HJK, where it led to several trials in, among others, German clubs TSG 1899 Hoffenheim and Bayern Munich, and also at Dutch club PSV Eindhoven. However, he couldn't move abroad until he was 16 years old, according to FIFA rules.

Therefore, he stayed at HJK and at the age of 15 in May 2019, started playing for HJK's reserve team, Klubi 04, in the Finnish third division, Kakkonen.

=== FC Nordsjælland ===
In September 2019 it was announced, that FC Nordsjælland had bought 16-year old Walta from HJK Helsinki for "a significant transfer amount". In his first season at the club, he mostly played for the U-17 team, but also made seven appearances and scored two goals for the U-19s, while he also made his reserve team debut in November 2019.

In the 2020–21 season, Walta became a key player for Nordsjælland's U19s, where he played 23 league games and scored six goals. At the end of the season, on 14 July 2021, Nordsjælland confirmed, that Walta had signed a new deal with the club and had been promoted to the first team squad. Four days later, on 18 July 2021, Walta got his professional debut for Nordsjælland against Viborg FF in the Danish Superliga.

==== HB Køge (loan) ====
On transfer deadline day, 31 January 2023, HB Køge confirmed that Walta had joined the club on a loan deal for the remainder of the season.

==== Mjällby AIF (loan) ====
After returning to Nordsjælland, he was sent out on loan again, this time to Allsvenskan club Mjällby AIF until the end of the 2023 season. On 18 September 2023, Walta scored his first goals in Allsvenskan by a brace against IFK Norrköping away, helping his side to take a 2–0 win. After the season, Mjällby were interested in signing with Walta on a permanent contract, but Nordsjælland's asking price of €1.3 million was too high for them. It was also reported that there were several interested clubs in Eredivisie.

=== IK Sirius ===
On 8 March 2024, Walta joined Allsvenskan side Sirius on a deal until 30 June 2028 for an undisclosed fee, rumoured to be €1.25 million. During his first season with Sirius, Walta made 29 appearances in Allsvenskan scoring seven goals and providing three assists. In November, Walta was listed in the 13th place of the top50 2024 Allsvenskan players by the Aftonbladet.

On 5 October 2025, Walta scored a brace and provided an assist as Sirius won Malmö FF 5–1 at home. On 26 October, he scored two goals and provided an assist again as Sirius won IF Elfsborg 4–0, marking his 14th and 15th goals of the season and making it the Sirius single-season goal scoring record in Allsvenskan.

=== Swansea City ===
On 2 February 2026, Walta joined Welsh side Swansea City A.F.C. on a loan until the end of the 2026 season which will then move to a permanent deal for an undisclosed fee, rumoured to be €3.5 million. On 2 May 2026, Walta scored his first goal for the club; a free kick which went in off the post in a 3–1 win against Charlton Athletic. On 1 July 2026, Swansea signed him permanently on a three-year contract.

LAFC

On August 31, 2026, it was announced that Walta would be loaned to LAFC in what would be a late season push for the playoffs after winning 1 in the last 11 and sacking the gaffer Marc dos Santos, commonly referred to as MDS.

On October 17, 2026, during the first half of an away match against NYCFC, Walta scored his first MLS goal with a free kick. It curled around the wall and made the keeper obsolete. Korean fans who traveled to watch Son Heung-Min anticipated Son to take the shot, but Son was gracious enough to let Walta finish, which he did.

== International career ==
Walta is a regular youth international, and has represented Finland at various youth national team levels.

On 4 June 2024, Walta made his senior national team debut for Finland, in a 4–2 friendly defeat against Portugal.

Walta also made six appearances and scored one goal for the Finland U21 in the 2025 UEFA European Under-21 Championship qualification campaign, helping them to qualify for the final tournament for the second time in the nation's history by defeating Norway in the play-offs. However, Walta missed the tournament in June 2025 due to suffering from mononucleosis, and was replaced by Doni Arifi.

== Personal life ==
His younger sister Ilona (born 2006) is also a professional footballer. She recently signed for Nottingham Forest.

== Career statistics ==
=== Club ===
As of 11 May 2026

Appearances and goals by club, season and competition
Club	Season	League			National cup (Note: Includes Danish Cup and Svenska Cupen)		Europe		Other		Total	
Club	Season	Division	Apps	Goals	Apps	Goals	Apps	Goals	Apps	Goals	Apps	Goals
Klubi 04	2019	Kakkonen	6	0	0	0	—		—		6	0
Nordsjælland	2021–22	Danish Superliga	14	0	2	0	—		—		16	0
Nordsjælland	2022–23	Danish Superliga	5	0	2	0	—		—		7	0
Nordsjælland	Total		19	0	4	0	0	0	0	0	23	0
HB Køge (loan)	2022–23	Danish 1st Division	14	3	0	0	—		—		14	3
Mjällby (loan)	2023	Allsvenskan	11	2	1	0	—		—		12	2
Sirius	2024	Allsvenskan	29	7	1	0	—		—		30	7
Sirius	2025	Allsvenskan	30	16	3	1	—		—		33	17
Sirius	Total		59	23	4	1	0	0	0	0	63	24
Swansea City (loan)	2025–26	Championship	10	1	—		—		—		10	1
Career total			119	29	9	1	0	0	0	0	129	31

=== International ===
As of match played 15 November 2026

National team	Year	Competitive		Friendly		Total	
National team	Year	Apps	Goals	Apps	Goals	Apps	Goals
Finland	2024	4 (Note: Appearances in the 2024–25 UEFA Nations League B.)	0	2	0	6	0
Finland	2025	3 (Note: Appearances in the 2026 FIFA World Cup qualification.)	0	1	1	4	1
Finland	2026	6 (Note: Appearances in the 2026–27 UEFA Nations League C.)	5	4 (Note: Includes two appearances in the 2026 FIFA Series.)	0	10	5
Total		13	5	7	1	20	6

Scores and results list Finland's goal tally first, score column indicates score after each Walta goal.

List of international goals scored by Leo Walta
No.	Date	Venue	Opponent	Score	Result	Competition
1	17 November 2025	Tammelan Stadion, Tampere, Finland	Andorra	4–0	4–0	Friendly
2	26 September 2026	San Marino Stadium, Serravalle, San Marino	San Marino	4–0	7–0	2026–27 UEFA Nations League C
3	26 September 2026	San Marino Stadium, Serravalle, San Marino	San Marino	5–0	7–0	2026–27 UEFA Nations League C
4	3 October 2026	Helsinki Olympic Stadium, Helsinki, Finland	Albania	1–1	2–1	2026–27 UEFA Nations League C
5	3 October 2026	Helsinki Olympic Stadium, Helsinki, Finland	Albania	2–1	2–1	2026–27 UEFA Nations League C
6	15 November 2026	Bolt Arena, Helsinki, Finland	San Marino	2–0	7–2	2026–27 UEFA Nations League C

== Honours ==
Finland

- FIFA Series: 2026

Individual

- Football Association of Finland: Young Player of the Year 2021
