= Daniel Håkans =

Finnish footballer (born 2000)

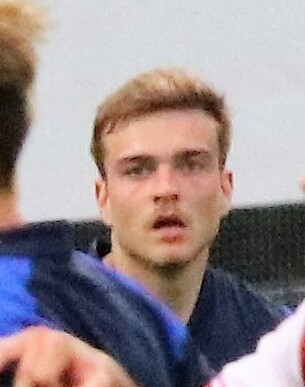
- Håkans with Finland U21 in 2022

Personal information
- Full name: Daniel Noel Mikael Håkans
- Date of birth: 26 October 2000 (age 26)
- Place of birth: Vaasa, Finland
- Height: 1.78 m (5 ft 10 in)
- Position: Winger

Team information
- Current team: Lech Poznań
- Number: 11

Youth career
- BK-48

Senior career*
Years	Team	Apps	(Gls)
2018	VIFK	19	(1)
2019–2020	SJK II	21	(1)
2019–2022	SJK	44	(2)
2022	→ Jerv (loan)	7	(1)
2023	Jerv	0	(0)
2023–2024	Vålerenga	33	(11)
2024–	Lech Poznań	36	(2)
2024–	Lech Poznań II	1	(1)

International career^{‡}
2015	Finland U15	1	(0)
2021–2022	Finland U21	9	(2)
2023–	Finland	18	(5)
- * Club domestic league appearances and goals as of 15:36, 9 November 2026 (UTC) ‡ National team caps and goals as of 19:07, 15 November 2026 (UTC)

Daniel Noel Mikael Håkans (born 26 October 2000) is a Finnish professional footballer playing as a winger for Ekstraklasa club Lech Poznań and the Finland national team.

== Early life ==
Born in Vaasa, Håkans is a Swedish-speaking Finn.

== Club career ==
=== SJK ===
Håkans started to play football with a local club VIFK, before moving to Seinäjoki and signing with Veikkausliiga club Seinäjoen Jalkapallokerho (SJK) in 2019, starting in the club's academy team SJK Akatemia in the second-tier. He said in an interview that he did not speak any Finnish before moving to Seinäjoki, and learned the language there. In SJK, Håkans was deployed in many different roles, as a wing-back and as a midfielder as well.

=== FK Jerv ===
In the summer 2022, Håkans signed a loan deal with Norwegian Eliteserien club Jerv for the rest of the season, with a purchase option. Despite Jerv being relegated after the season, the club exercised their option and Håkans signed a permanent deal, for a total fee of €210,000.

=== Vålerenga ===
However, after only a short time, Håkans was acquired by fellow Eliteserien side Vålerenga on a four-year deal as the replacement for Osame Sahraoui, for a transfer fee of €400,000. He usually celebrates his goals with a Käärijä-celebration.

=== Lech Poznan ===
On 1 August 2024, Håkans officially joined Polish Ekstraklasa club Lech Poznań on a deal until June 2028, for a reported fee of €850,000 which would rise to €1.27 million per add-ons. On 8 March 2025, Håkans scored his first goal for Lech, a winning goal in a 3–1 home win over Stal Mielec in the league. They went on to win the Polish championship title in the 2024–25 season, when Håkans contributed in 20 matches, scoring once and providing six assists. He missed most of the 2025–26 season due to injuries.

== International career ==
On 8 June 2023, Håkans was called up to the Finland national team for the first time; he made his senior national team debut on 16 June 2023 against Slovenia. On 19 June 2023, in his second international appearance, he scored his first goals for his country – a hat-trick during a nine-minute span – after coming off the bench for Oliver Antman in the 60th minute of in a 6–0 win against San Marino during the UEFA Euro 2024 qualifying. Håkans made six appearances in the qualification campaign and scored four goals.

== Career statistics ==
=== Club ===
As of match played 5 November 2026

Appearances and goals by club, season and competition
Club	Season	League			National cup (Note: Includes Suomen Cup, NM Cup)		League cup (Note: Includes Finnish League Cup)		Europe		Total	
Club	Season	Division	Apps	Goals	Apps	Goals	Apps	Goals	Apps	Goals	Apps	Goals
VIFK	2018	Kakkonen	19	1	0	0	—		—		19	1
SJK Akatemia	2019	Kakkonen	19	1	0	0	—		—		19	1
SJK Akatemia	2020	Ykkönen	2	0	0	0	—		—		2	0
SJK Akatemia	Total		21	1	0	0	0	0	0	0	21	1
SJK	2019	Veikkausliiga	2	0	4	0	—		—		6	0
SJK	2020	Veikkausliiga	11	0	3	0	—		—		14	0
SJK	2021	Veikkausliiga	16	1	4	0	—		—		20	1
SJK	2022	Veikkausliiga	15	1	0	0	1	0	4 (Note: Appearance(s) in UEFA Conference League)	0	20	1
SJK	Total		44	2	11	0	1	0	4	0	60	2
Jerv (loan)	2022	Eliteserien	7	1	1	0	—		—		8	1
Vålerenga	2023	Eliteserien	24	6	4	0	—		—		28	6
Vålerenga	2024	1. divisjon	9	5	0	0	—		—		9	5
Vålerenga	Total		33	11	4	0	0	0	0	0	37	11
Lech Poznań	2024–25	Ekstraklasa	20	1	0	0	—		—		20	1
Lech Poznań	2025–26	Ekstraklasa	9	1	0	0	—		1	0	10	1
Lech Poznań	2026–27	Ekstraklasa	7	0	0	0	0	0	9 (Note: Two appearances in UEFA Champions League, seven appearances and two goals in UEFA Europa League)	2	16	2
Lech Poznań	Total		36	2	0	0	0	0	10	2	46	4
Lech Poznań II	2024–25	III liga, gr. II	1	1	0	0	—		—		1	1
Career total			161	19	16	0	1	0	14	2	191	21

=== International ===
As of match played 15 November 2026

National team	Year	Competitive		Friendly		Total	
National team	Year	Apps	Goals	Apps	Goals	Apps	Goals
Finland	2023	6 (Note: Appearances in the UEFA Euro 2024 qualification matches)	4	0	0	6	4
Finland	2024	3 (Note: One appearance in a UEFA Euro 2024 qualification match, two appearances in UEFA Nations League)	0	1	0	4	0
Finland	2025	2 (Note: Appearances in the 2026 FIFA World Cup qualification.)	0	0	0	2	0
Finland	2026	4	1	2	0	6	1
Total		15	5	3	0	18	5

Finland score listed first, score column indicates score after each Håkans goal.

List of international goals scored by Daniel Håkans
No.	Date	Venue	Cap	Opponent	Score	Result	Competition	Ref.
1	19 June 2023	Helsinki Olympic Stadium, Helsinki, Finland	2	San Marino	3–0	6–0	UEFA Euro 2024 qualifying	
2	19 June 2023	Helsinki Olympic Stadium, Helsinki, Finland	2	San Marino	4–0	6–0	UEFA Euro 2024 qualifying	
3	19 June 2023	Helsinki Olympic Stadium, Helsinki, Finland	2	San Marino	5–0	6–0	UEFA Euro 2024 qualifying	
4	17 November 2023	Helsinki Olympic Stadium, Helsinki, Finland	5	Northern Ireland	2–0	4–0	UEFA Euro 2024 qualifying	
5	15 November 2026	Töölö Football Stadium, Helsinki, Finland	18	San Marino	6–1	7–2	2026–27 UEFA Nations League C	

== Honours ==
Lech Poznań

- Ekstraklasa: 2024–25, 2025–26
