= Hannu Honkonen =

Finnish composer

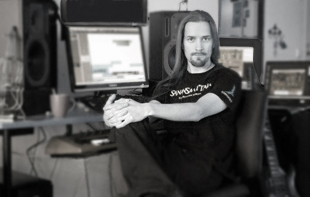

Hannu Honkonen (born 1 of may 1982 in Jyväskylä) is a Finnish musician, composer and producer. His main focus is on Film, TV and other media related audio productions. Honkonen graduated from Jyväskylä Educational Consortium's audio-visual education program in 2005. After this he moved to full-time film and TV composer. He composes music that can be recognized from its usage of modern computer technology with classical instruments.

Also he has worked with different types of audio productions as recorder, arranger, producer, composer and audio masterer. His clients and co-partners has been for example: Rebelhead, Swallow The Sun, Dance Nation, Soulfallen, Kärtsy Hatakka and Waltari.

Hannu Honkonen composed the original score of the Finnish thriller film The Messenger (2010).
