= 2024–25 UEFA Nations League B =

Tournament details
- Dates: 6 September – 19 November 2024
- Teams: 16
- Promoted: Czech Republic; England; Greece; Norway; Turkey; Wales
- Relegated: Albania; Finland; Iceland; Kazakhstan; Montenegro

Tournament statistics
- Matches played: 48
- Goals scored: 128 (2.67 per match)
- Attendance: 1,179,554 (24,574 per match)
- Top scorer(s): (Norway) Erling Haaland (7 goals)

The 2024–25 UEFA Nations League B was the second division of the 2024–25 edition of the UEFA Nations League, the fourth season of the international football competition involving the men's national teams of the 54 of 55 member associations of UEFA.

== Format ==
League B consisted of 16 UEFA members ranked from 17–32 in the 2024–25 UEFA Nations League access list, split into four groups of four. Each team played six matches within their group, using the home-and-away round-robin format on double matchdays in September, October, and November 2024. The winners of each group were promoted to the 2026–27 UEFA Nations League A, and the fourth-placed team of each group were relegated to the 2026–27 UEFA Nations League C. In addition, the second-placed and third-placed teams of each group advanced to the promotion/relegation play-offs, played home-and-away over two legs. The League B second-placed teams participated in promotion play-offs against the third-placed teams from League A, while the League B third-placed teams participated in relegation play-offs against the second-placed teams from League C, both taking place in March 2025. In the play-offs, teams from the higher leagues hosted the second leg, with the winners of each tie participating in the higher league for the next Nations League season, while the losers entered the lower league.

== Teams ==
=== Team changes ===
The following were the team changes in League B from the 2022–23 season:

Incoming
Relegated from Nations League A	Promoted from Nations League C
Austria; Czech Republic; England; Wales	Georgia; Greece; Kazakhstan; Turkey

Outgoing
Promoted to Nations League A	Relegated to Nations League C	Banned from Nations League
Bosnia and Herzegovina; Israel; Scotland; Serbia	Armenia; Romania; Sweden	Russia (Note: On 2 May 2022, UEFA announced that Russia were suspended and automatically relegated from League B. Though due to participate in League C for the 2024–25 season, Russia were still suspended at the time of UEFA's entry deadline, and thus were banned from the competition.)

=== Seeding ===
In the 2024–25 access list, UEFA ranked teams based on the 2022–23 Nations League overall ranking. The seeding pots for the league phase were confirmed on 2 December 2023, and were based on the access list ranking.

Pot 1
Team	Rank
Austria	17
Czech Republic	18
England	19
Wales	20

Pot 2
Team	Rank
Finland	21
Ukraine	22
Iceland	23
Norway	24

Pot 3
Team	Rank
Slovenia	25
Republic of Ireland	26
Albania	27
Montenegro	28

Pot 4
Team	Rank
Georgia	29
Greece	30
Turkey	31
Kazakhstan	32

The draw for the league phase took place at the Maison de la Mutualité in Paris, France, on 8 February 2024, 18:00 CET. Each group contained one team from each pot. Due to excessive travel restrictions, only one of England, Iceland, Republic of Ireland or Wales could be drawn with Kazakhstan.

== Groups ==
The fixture list was confirmed by UEFA on 9 February 2024, the day following the draw.

Times are CET/CEST, (Note: CEST (UTC+2) for matchdays 1–4 (September and October 2024), CET (UTC+1) for matchdays 5–6 (November 2024).) as listed by UEFA (local times, if different, are in parentheses).

=== Group 1 ===
Pos	Team	Pld	W	D	L	GF	GA	GD	Pts	Promotion, qualification or relegation	(Czech Republic)	(Ukraine)	(Georgia (country))	(Albania)
1	Czech Republic (P)	6	3	2	1	9	8	+1	11	Promotion to League A	—	3–2	2–1	2–0
2	Ukraine	6	2	2	2	8	8	0	8	Qualification for promotion play-offs	1–1	—	1–0	1–2
3	Georgia (O)	6	2	1	3	7	6	+1	7 (Note: Tied on head-to-head results. Overall goal difference: Georgia +1, Albania –2.)	Qualification for relegation play-offs	4–1	1–1	—	0–1
4	Albania (R)	6	2	1	3	4	6	−2	7	Relegation to League C	0–0	1–2	0–1	—

Source: UEFA
Rules for classification: Tiebreakers
(O) Play-off winners; (P) Promoted; (R) Relegated
Notes:
7 September 2024
18:00 (20:00 UTC+4)

Georgia	4–1	Czech Republic
Kvaratskhelia 33' (pen.); Chakvetadze 53'; Mikautadze 63'; Kochorashvili 66'	Report	Kalvach 80'

Mikheil Meskhi Stadium, Tbilisi
Attendance: 20,401
Referee: Orel Grinfeld (Israel)
7 September 2024
20:45

Ukraine	1–2	Albania
Konoplya 49'	Report	Ismajli 54'; Asani 66'

Stadion Letná, Prague (Czech Republic) (Note: Due to the Russian invasion of Ukraine, Ukraine were required to play their home matches at neutral venues until further notice.)
Attendance: 15,500
Referee: Luis Godinho (Portugal)

10 September 2024
20:45

Albania	0–1	Georgia
	Report	Kochorashvili 71'

Arena Kombëtare, Tirana
Attendance: 20,400
Referee: Erik Lambrechts (Belgium)
10 September 2024
20:45

Czech Republic	3–2	Ukraine
Šulc 21', 45+2'; Souček 80' (pen.)	Report	Vanat 37'; Sudakov 84'

Fortuna Arena, Prague
Attendance: 18,722
Referee: John Beaton (Scotland)

11 October 2024
20:45

Czech Republic	2–0	Albania
Chorý 3', 63'	Report

Stadion Letná, Prague
Attendance: 17,823
Referee: Benoît Bastien (France)
11 October 2024
20:45

Ukraine	1–0	Georgia
Mudryk 35'	Report

Poznań Stadium, Poznań (Poland)
Attendance: 21,700
Referee: Julian Weinberger (Austria)

14 October 2024
18:00 (20:00 UTC+4)

Georgia	0–1	Albania
	Report	Asllani 48'

Mikheil Meskhi Stadium, Tbilisi
Attendance: 19,981
Referee: Danny Makkelie (Netherlands)
14 October 2024
20:45

Ukraine	1–1	Czech Republic
Dovbyk 52' (pen.)	Report	Červ 18'

Wrocław Stadium, Wrocław (Poland)
Attendance: 14,734
Referee: Guillermo Cuadra Fernández (Spain)

16 November 2024
18:00 (21:00 UTC+4)

Georgia	1–1	Ukraine
Mikautadze 76'	Report	Kverkvelia 7' (o.g.)

Adjarabet Arena, Batumi
Attendance: 19,120
Referee: Chris Kavanagh (England)
16 November 2024
20:45

Albania	0–0	Czech Republic
	Report

Arena Kombëtare, Tirana
Attendance: 20,800
Referee: Sandro Schärer (Switzerland)

19 November 2024
20:45

Albania	1–2	Ukraine
Bajrami 75' (pen.)	Report	Zinchenko 5'; Yaremchuk 10'

Arena Kombëtare, Tirana
Attendance: 20,547
Referee: João Pinheiro (Portugal)
19 November 2024
20:45

Czech Republic	2–1	Georgia
Šulc 3'; Hložek 24'	Report	Mikautadze 60'

Andrův stadion, Olomouc
Attendance: 12,221
Referee: Anastasios Papapetrou (Greece)

=== Group 2 ===
Pos	Team	Pld	W	D	L	GF	GA	GD	Pts	Promotion, qualification or relegation	(England)	(Greece)	(Republic of Ireland)	(Finland)
1	England (P)	6	5	0	1	16	3	+13	15 (Note: Tied on head to head points. Head-to-head goal difference: England +2, Greece −2.)	Promotion to League A	—	1–2	5–0	2–0
2	Greece (O, P)	6	5	0	1	11	4	+7	15	Qualification for promotion play-offs	0–3	—	2–0	3–0
3	Republic of Ireland (O)	6	2	0	4	3	12	−9	6	Qualification for relegation play-offs	0–2	0–2	—	1–0
4	Finland (R)	6	0	0	6	2	13	−11	0	Relegation to League C	1–3	0–2	1–2	—

Source: UEFA
Rules for classification: Tiebreakers
(O) Play-off winners; (P) Promoted; (R) Relegated
Notes:
7 September 2024
18:00 (17:00 UTC+1)

Republic of Ireland	0–2	England
	Report	Rice 11'; Grealish 26'

Aviva Stadium, Dublin
Attendance: 55,359
Referee: José María Sánchez Martínez (Spain)
7 September 2024
20:45 (21:45 UTC+3)

Greece	3–0	Finland
Ioannidis 23', 76'; Källman 37' (o.g.)	Report

Karaiskakis Stadium, Piraeus
Attendance: 17,293
Referee: Urs Schnyder (Switzerland)

10 September 2024
20:45 (19:45 UTC+1)

England	2–0	Finland
Kane 57', 76'	Report

Wembley Stadium, London
Attendance: 70,221
Referee: Morten Krogh (Denmark)
10 September 2024
20:45 (19:45 UTC+1)

Republic of Ireland	0–2	Greece
	Report	Ioannidis 50'; Tzolis 87'

Aviva Stadium, Dublin
Attendance: 37,274
Referee: Espen Eskås (Norway)

10 October 2024
20:45 (19:45 UTC+1)

England	1–2	Greece
Bellingham 87'	Report	Pavlidis 49', 90+4'

Wembley Stadium, London
Attendance: 79,012
Referee: Andrea Colombo (Italy)
10 October 2024
20:45 (21:45 UTC+3)

Finland	1–2	Republic of Ireland
Pohjanpalo 17'	Report	Scales 57'; Brady 88'

Helsinki Olympic Stadium, Helsinki
Attendance: 16,105
Referee: Aleksandar Stavrev (North Macedonia)

13 October 2024
18:00 (19:00 UTC+3)

Finland	1–3	England
Hoskonen 87'	Report	Grealish 18'; Alexander-Arnold 74'; Rice 84'

Helsinki Olympic Stadium, Helsinki
Attendance: 32,411
Referee: Giorgi Kruashvili (Georgia)
13 October 2024
20:45 (21:45 UTC+3)

Greece	2–0	Republic of Ireland
Bakasetas 48'; Mantalos 90+1'	Report

Karaiskakis Stadium, Piraeus
Attendance: 30,253
Referee: Joey Kooij (Netherlands)

14 November 2024
20:45 (21:45 UTC+2)

Greece	0–3	England
	Report	Watkins 7'; Vlachodimos 78' (o.g.); Jones 83'

Athens Olympic Stadium, Athens
Attendance: 60,664
Referee: Daniel Siebert (Germany)
14 November 2024
20:45 (19:45 UTC+0)

Republic of Ireland	1–0	Finland
Ferguson 45'	Report

Aviva Stadium, Dublin
Attendance: 39,163
Referee: Harm Osmers (Germany)

17 November 2024
18:00 (17:00 UTC+0)

England	5–0	Republic of Ireland
Kane 53' (pen.); Gordon 56'; Gallagher 58'; Bowen 76'; Harwood-Bellis 79'	Report

Wembley Stadium, London
Attendance: 79,969
Referee: Erik Lambrechts (Belgium)
17 November 2024
18:00 (19:00 UTC+2)

Finland	0–2	Greece
	Report	Bakasetas 52'; Tzolis 56'

Helsinki Olympic Stadium, Helsinki
Attendance: 17,661
Referee: Willy Delajod (France)

=== Group 3 ===
Pos	Team	Pld	W	D	L	GF	GA	GD	Pts	Promotion, qualification or relegation	(Norway)	(Austria)	(Slovenia)	(Kazakhstan)
1	Norway (P)	6	4	1	1	15	7	+8	13	Promotion to League A	—	2–1	3–0	5–0
2	Austria	6	3	2	1	14	5	+9	11	Qualification for promotion play-offs	5–1	—	1–1	4–0
3	Slovenia (O)	6	2	2	2	7	9	−2	8	Qualification for relegation play-offs	1–4	1–1	—	3–0
4	Kazakhstan (R)	6	0	1	5	0	15	−15	1	Relegation to League C	0–0	0–2	0–1	—

Source: UEFA
Rules for classification: Tiebreakers
(O) Play-off winners; (P) Promoted; (R) Relegated
6 September 2024
16:00 (19:00 UTC+5)

Kazakhstan	0–0	Norway
	Report

Almaty Central Stadium, Almaty
Attendance: 23,173
Referee: Allard Lindhout (Netherlands)
6 September 2024
20:45

Slovenia	1–1	Austria
Šeško 16' (pen.)	Report	Laimer 28'

Stožice Stadium, Ljubljana
Attendance: 14,834
Referee: Radu Petrescu (Romania)

9 September 2024
20:45

Norway	2–1	Austria
Myhre 9'; Haaland 80'	Report	Sabitzer 37'

Ullevaal Stadion, Oslo
Attendance: 23,171
Referee: Nikola Dabanović (Montenegro)
9 September 2024
20:45

Slovenia	3–0	Kazakhstan
Šeško 23', 28', 63'	Report

Stožice Stadium, Ljubljana
Attendance: 9,814
Referee: João Pinheiro (Portugal)

10 October 2024
20:45

Austria	4–0	Kazakhstan
Baumgartner 10'; Lienhart 54'; Sabitzer 56'; Seidl 79'	Report

Raiffeisen Arena, Linz
Attendance: 14,500
Referee: Don Robertson (Scotland)
10 October 2024
20:45

Norway	3–0	Slovenia
Haaland 7', 62'; Sørloth 52'	Report

Ullevaal Stadion, Oslo
Attendance: 23,341
Referee: Manfredas Lukjančukas (Lithuania)

13 October 2024
15:00 (18:00 UTC+5)

Kazakhstan	0–1	Slovenia
	Report	Mlakar 55'

Almaty Central Stadium, Almaty
Attendance: 19,783
Referee: Craig Pawson (England)
13 October 2024
20:45

Austria	5–1	Norway
Arnautović 8', 49' (pen.); Lienhart 58'; Posch 62'; Gregoritsch 71'	Report	Sørloth 39'

Raiffeisen Arena, Linz
Attendance: 16,500
Referee: Tamás Bognár (Hungary)

14 November 2024
16:00 (20:00 UTC+5)

Kazakhstan	0–2	Austria
	Report	Baumgartner 15'; Gregoritsch 25'

Almaty Central Stadium, Almaty
Attendance: 9,753
Referee: Marian Barbu (Romania)
14 November 2024
20:45

Slovenia	1–4	Norway
Šeško 21' (pen.)	Report	Nusa 4', 59'; Haaland 45'; Hauge 82'

Stožice Stadium, Ljubljana
Attendance: 15,308
Referee: Michael Oliver (England)

17 November 2024
18:00

Austria	1–1	Slovenia
Schmid 27'	Report	Gnezda Čerin 81'

Ernst Happel Stadion, Vienna
Attendance: 46,000
Referee: Glenn Nyberg (Sweden)
17 November 2024
18:00

Norway	5–0	Kazakhstan
Haaland 23', 37', 71'; Sørloth 41'; Nusa 76'	Report

Ullevaal Stadion, Oslo
Attendance: 23,458
Referee: Jasper Vergoote (Belgium)

=== Group 4 ===
Pos	Team	Pld	W	D	L	GF	GA	GD	Pts	Promotion, qualification or relegation	(Wales)	(Turkey)	(Iceland)	(Montenegro)
1	Wales (P)	6	3	3	0	9	4	+5	12	Promotion to League A	—	0–0	4–1	1–0
2	Turkey (O, P)	6	3	2	1	9	6	+3	11	Qualification for promotion play-offs	0–0	—	3–1	1–0
3	Iceland (R)	6	2	1	3	10	13	−3	7	Qualification for relegation play-offs	2–2	2–4	—	2–0
4	Montenegro (R)	6	1	0	5	4	9	−5	3	Relegation to League C	1–2	3–1	0–2	—

Source: UEFA
Rules for classification: Tiebreakers
(O) Play-off winners; (P) Promoted; (R) Relegated
6 September 2024
20:45 (18:45 UTC+0)

Iceland	2–0	Montenegro
Óskarsson 39'; Þorsteinsson 58'	Report

Laugardalsvöllur, Reykjavík
Attendance: 4,683
Referee: Willy Delajod (France)
6 September 2024
20:45 (19:45 UTC+1)

Wales	0–0	Turkey
	Report

Cardiff City Stadium, Cardiff
Attendance: 28,625
Referee: Rohit Saggi (Norway)

9 September 2024
20:45

Montenegro	1–2	Wales
Camaj 73'	Report	Moore 1'; Wilson 3'

Gradski Stadion, Nikšić
Attendance: 3,569
Referee: Georgi Kabakov (Bulgaria)
9 September 2024
20:45 (21:45 UTC+3)

Turkey	3–1	Iceland
Aktürkoğlu 2', 52', 88'	Report	Pálsson 37'

Gürsel Aksel Stadium, İzmir
Attendance: 16,167
Referee: Enea Jorgji (Albania)

11 October 2024
20:45 (18:45 UTC+0)

Iceland	2–2	Wales
Tómasson 69'; Ward 72' (o.g.)	Report	Johnson 11'; Wilson 29'

Laugardalsvöllur, Reykjavík
Attendance: 6,141
Referee: Antoni Bandić (Bosnia and Herzegovina)
11 October 2024
20:45 (21:45 UTC+3)

Turkey	1–0	Montenegro
Kahveci 69'	Report

Samsun 19 Mayıs Stadium, Samsun
Attendance: 28,829
Referee: Daniele Chiffi (Italy)

14 October 2024
20:45 (18:45 UTC+0)

Iceland	2–4	Turkey
Óskarsson 3'; Guðjohnsen 83'	Report	Kahveci 62'; Çalhanoğlu 67' (pen.); Güler 88'; Aktürkoğlu 90+5'

Laugardalsvöllur, Reykjavík
Attendance: 5,260
Referee: Damian Sylwestrzak (Poland)
14 October 2024
20:45 (19:45 UTC+1)

Wales	1–0	Montenegro
Wilson 36' (pen.)	Report

Cardiff City Stadium, Cardiff
Attendance: 27,326
Referee: Filip Glova (Slovakia)

16 November 2024
18:00

Montenegro	0–2	Iceland
	Report	Óskarsson 74'; Jóhannesson 88'

Gradski Stadion, Nikšić
Attendance: 2,354
Referee: Sven Jablonski (Germany)
16 November 2024
18:00 (20:00 UTC+3)

Turkey	0–0	Wales
	Report

Kadir Has Stadium, Kayseri
Attendance: 28,812
Referee: Juan Martínez Munuera (Spain)

19 November 2024
20:45

Montenegro	3–1	Turkey
Krstović 29', 45', 73'	Report	Yıldız 37'

Gradski Stadion, Nikšić
Attendance: 2,579
Referee: Urs Schnyder (Switzerland)
19 November 2024
20:45 (19:45 UTC+0)

Wales	4–1	Iceland
Cullen 32', 45+1'; Johnson 65'; Wilson 79'	Report	Guðjohnsen 8'

Cardiff City Stadium, Cardiff
Attendance: 28,240
Referee: António Nobre (Portugal)

== Goalscorers ==
There were 128 goals scored in 48 matches, for an average of 2.67 goals per match.

7 goals

- (Norway national football team) Erling Haaland

5 goals

- (Slovenia national football team) Benjamin Šeško

4 goals

- (Turkey national football team) Kerem Aktürkoğlu
- (Wales national football team) Harry Wilson

3 goals

- (Czech Republic national football team) Pavel Šulc
- (England national football team) Harry Kane
- (Georgia national football team) Georges Mikautadze
- (Greece national football team) Fotis Ioannidis
- (Iceland national football team) Orri Óskarsson
- (Montenegro national football team) Nikola Krstović
- (Norway national football team) Antonio Nusa
- (Norway national football team) Alexander Sørloth

2 goals

- (Austria national football team) Marko Arnautović
- (Austria national football team) Christoph Baumgartner
- (Austria national football team) Michael Gregoritsch
- (Austria national football team) Philipp Lienhart
- (Austria national football team) Marcel Sabitzer
- (Czech Republic national football team) Tomáš Chorý
- (England national football team) Jack Grealish
- (England national football team) Declan Rice
- (Georgia national football team) Giorgi Kochorashvili
- (Greece national football team) Anastasios Bakasetas
- (Greece national football team) Vangelis Pavlidis
- (Greece national football team) Christos Tzolis
- (Iceland national football team) Andri Guðjohnsen
- (Turkey national football team) İrfan Kahveci
- (Wales national football team) Liam Cullen
- (Wales national football team) Brennan Johnson

1 goal

- (Albania national football team) Jasir Asani
- (Albania national football team) Kristjan Asllani
- (Albania national football team) Nedim Bajrami
- (Albania national football team) Ardian Ismajli
- (Austria national football team) Konrad Laimer
- (Austria national football team) Stefan Posch
- (Austria national football team) Romano Schmid
- (Austria national football team) Matthias Seidl
- (Czech Republic national football team) Lukáš Červ
- (Czech Republic national football team) Adam Hložek
- (Czech Republic national football team) Lukáš Kalvach
- (Czech Republic national football team) Tomáš Souček
- (England national football team) Trent Alexander-Arnold
- (England national football team) Jude Bellingham
- (England national football team) Jarrod Bowen
- (England national football team) Conor Gallagher
- (England national football team) Anthony Gordon
- (England national football team) Taylor Harwood-Bellis
- (England national football team) Curtis Jones
- (England national football team) Ollie Watkins
- (Finland national football team) Arttu Hoskonen
- (Finland national football team) Joel Pohjanpalo
- (Georgia national football team) Giorgi Chakvetadze
- (Georgia national football team) Khvicha Kvaratskhelia
- (Greece national football team) Petros Mantalos
- (Iceland national football team) Ísak Bergmann Jóhannesson
- (Iceland national football team) Jón Dagur Þorsteinsson
- (Iceland national football team) Victor Pálsson
- (Iceland national football team) Logi Tómasson
- (Montenegro national football team) Driton Camaj
- (Norway national football team) Felix Horn Myhre
- (Norway national football team) Jens Petter Hauge
- (Republic of Ireland national football team) Robbie Brady
- (Republic of Ireland national football team) Evan Ferguson
- (Republic of Ireland national football team) Liam Scales
- (Slovenia national football team) Adam Gnezda Čerin
- (Slovenia national football team) Jan Mlakar
- (Turkey national football team) Hakan Çalhanoğlu
- (Turkey national football team) Arda Güler
- (Turkey national football team) Kenan Yıldız
- (Ukraine national football team) Artem Dovbyk
- (Ukraine national football team) Yukhym Konoplya
- (Ukraine national football team) Mykhailo Mudryk
- (Ukraine national football team) Heorhiy Sudakov
- (Ukraine national football team) Vladyslav Vanat
- (Ukraine national football team) Roman Yaremchuk
- (Ukraine national football team) Oleksandr Zinchenko
- (Wales national football team) Kieffer Moore

1 own goal

- (Finland national football team) Benjamin Källman (against Greece)
- (Georgia national football team) Solomon Kvirkvelia (against Ukraine)
- (Greece national football team) Odysseas Vlachodimos (against England)
- (Wales national football team) Danny Ward (against Iceland)

== Overall ranking ==
Following the league phase, the 16 League B teams were ordered 17th to 32nd in an interim overall ranking for the 2024–25 UEFA Nations League according to the following rules:

- The teams finishing first in the groups were ranked 17th to 20th according to the results of the league phase.
- The teams finishing second in the groups were ranked 21st to 24th according to the results of the league phase.
- The teams finishing third in the groups were ranked 25th to 28th according to the results of the league phase.
- The teams finishing fourth in the groups were ranked 29th to 32nd according to the results of the league phase.

Rnk	Grp	Team	Pld	W	D	L	GF	GA	GD	Pts
17	B2	England	6	5	0	1	16	3	+13	15
18	B3	Norway	6	4	1	1	15	7	+8	13
19	B4	Wales	6	3	3	0	9	4	+5	12
20	B1	Czech Republic	6	3	2	1	9	8	+1	11
21	B2	Greece	6	5	0	1	11	4	+7	15
22	B3	Austria	6	3	2	1	14	5	+9	11
23	B4	Turkey	6	3	2	1	9	6	+3	11
24	B1	Ukraine	6	2	2	2	8	8	0	8
25	B3	Slovenia	6	2	2	2	7	9	−2	8
26	B1	Georgia	6	2	1	3	7	6	+1	7
27	B4	Iceland	6	2	1	3	10	13	−3	7
28	B2	Republic of Ireland	6	2	0	4	3	12	−9	6
29	B1	Albania	6	2	1	3	4	6	−2	7
30	B4	Montenegro	6	1	0	5	4	9	−5	3
31	B3	Kazakhstan	6	0	1	5	0	15	−15	1
32	B2	Finland	6	0	0	6	2	13	−11	0

Source: UEFA
Rules for classification: Ranking criteria

A final overall ranking was also compiled, though this was only used to rank teams within their new leagues for the following edition of the competition.
