= 2026–27 UEFA Nations League C =

Tournament details
- Dates: 25 September – 16 November 2026
- Teams: 16
- Promoted: Albania; Iceland; Montenegro; Slovakia

Tournament statistics
- Matches played: 48
- Goals scored: 126 (2.63 per match)
- Attendance: 344,291 (7,173 per match)
- Top scorer(s): (Iceland) Andri Guðjohnsen (6 goals)

The 2026–27 UEFA Nations League C was the third division of the 2026–27 edition of the UEFA Nations League, the fifth season of the international football competition involving the men's national teams of the member associations of UEFA.

== Format ==
League C consisted of 16 UEFA members ranked from 33–48 in the 2024–25 UEFA Nations League final overall ranking, split into four groups of four. Each team played six matches within their group, using the home-and-away round-robin format on matchdays in September, October and November 2026. The winners of each group were promoted to the 2028–29 UEFA Nations League B. The second-placed teams of each group will participate in promotion play-offs against the fourth-placed teams from League B in March 2027. In the play-offs, teams from the higher leagues will host the second leg, with the winners of each tie participating in League B the next Nations League season, while the losers will enter League C.

Originally, the promotion/relegation play-offs would have concerned all third-place teams in League B and all runners-up in League C, with extra play-offs concerning the two best last-places in League C and both runners-up in League D to be held in March 2028. However, due to the changes scheduled for the 2028–29 UEFA Nations League, in which the competition will be reduced from four leagues to three leagues of 18 teams, promotion/relegation was rebalanced to make all three upcoming leagues be at 18 teams.

== Teams ==
League C included sixteen teams based on the results of the 2024–25 season: the four group fourth-placed teams from League B, the four winners of the League B/C play-offs, the four third-placed teams from League C, the two group winners from League D and the two losers of the League C/D play-offs.

=== Team changes ===
The following were the team changes in League C from the 2024–25 season:

Incoming
Relegated from Nations League B	Promoted from Nations League D
Albania; Finland; Iceland; Kazakhstan; Montenegro	Moldova; San Marino

Outgoing
Promoted to Nations League B	Relegated to Nations League D
Kosovo; North Macedonia; Northern Ireland; Romania; Sweden	Azerbaijan; Lithuania

=== Seeding ===
The teams were seeded for the league phase based on the 2024–25 Nations League final overall ranking, considering promotion and relegation between the leagues.

Pot 1
Team	Rank
Iceland	33
Albania	34
Montenegro	35
Kazakhstan	36

Pot 2
Team	Rank
Finland	37
Slovakia	38
Bulgaria	39
Armenia	40

Pot 3
Team	Rank
Belarus	41
Faroe Islands	42
Cyprus	43
Estonia	44

Pot 4
Team	Rank
Latvia (Note: The identity of the two promotion/relegation play-off winners was not known at the time of the draw.)	45
Luxembourg	46
Moldova	47
San Marino	48

The draw for the league phase took place in Brussels, Belgium, on 12 February 2026, 18:00 CET. Groups were drawn to contain one team from each pot. Due to excessive travel restrictions, a maximum of one pair of teams identified with excessive travel distance in relation to other countries could be placed in the same group: Iceland with Armenia or Cyprus; Kazakhstan with Faroe Islands, Gibraltar, or Malta. Due to winter venue restrictions, a maximum of two teams whose venues were identified as having high or medium risk of severe winter conditions could be placed in the same group: Estonia, Faroe Islands, Finland, Iceland, and Latvia.

== Groups ==
The fixture list was confirmed by UEFA on 13 February 2026, the day following the draw.

Times are CET/CEST, (Note: CEST (UTC+2) for matchdays 1–4 (September and October 2026), CET (UTC+1) for matchdays 5–6 (November 2026).) as listed by UEFA (local times, if different, are in parentheses).

=== Group 1 ===
Pos	Team	Pld	W	D	L	GF	GA	GD	Pts	Promotion or qualification	(Albania)	(Belarus)	(Finland)	(San Marino)
1	Albania (P)	6	5	0	1	12	3	+9	15	Promotion to League B	—	2–0	2–0	2–1
2	Belarus	6	3	1	2	7	4	+3	10 (Note: Head-to-head points: Belarus 4, Finland 1.)	Qualification for promotion play-offs	0–2	—	1–0	4–0
3	Finland	6	3	1	2	16	6	+10	10		2–1	0–0	—	7–2
4	San Marino	6	0	0	6	3	25	−22	0		0–3	0–2	0–7	—

Source: UEFA
Rules for classification: Tiebreakers
(P) Promoted
Notes:
26 September 2026
18:00

San Marino	0–7	Finland
	Report	Pohjanpalo 5', 79', 88' (pen.); Svanbäck 14'; Källman 33'; Walta 50', 55'

San Marino Stadium, Serravalle
Attendance: 1,148
Referee: Nathan Verboomen (Belgium)
26 September 2026
20:45

Albania	2–0	Belarus
Asllani 34' (pen.); Muçi 45+2'	Report

Arena Kombëtare, Tirana
Attendance: 18,150
Referee: Sam Barrott (England)

29 September 2026
18:00 (19:00 UTC+3)

Finland	0–0	Belarus
	Report

Helsinki Olympic Stadium, Helsinki
Attendance: 7,262
Referee: Nikola Dabanović (Montenegro)
29 September 2026
20:45

San Marino	0–3	Albania
	Report	Mehmeti 21'; Uzuni 27'; Manaj 65'

San Marino Stadium, Serravalle
Attendance: 3,402
Referee: Mihály Káprály (Hungary)

3 October 2026
15:00 (16:00 UTC+3)

Finland	2–1	Albania
Walta 26', 71'	Report	Manaj 4'

Helsinki Olympic Stadium, Helsinki
Attendance: 24,885
Referee: Rob Hennessy (Republic of Ireland)
3 October 2026
18:00

Belarus	4–0	San Marino
Kontsevoy 46', 88'; Shumansky 65'; Ebong 68'	Report

Illovszky Rudolf Stadion, Budapest (Hungary) (Note: Due to Belarusian involvement in the Russian invasion of Ukraine, Belarus were required to play their home matches at neutral venues, and behind closed doors, until further notice.)
Attendance: 0
Referee: Alexandros Tsakalidis (Greece)

6 October 2026
20:45

Albania	2–1	San Marino
Asllani 11', 90+3' (pen.)	Report	Lazzari 66'

Arena Kombëtare, Tirana
Attendance: 16,240
Referee: Mehmet Türkmen (Turkey)
6 October 2026
20:45

Belarus	1–0	Finland
Shumansky 1'	Report

Illovszky Rudolf Stadion, Budapest (Hungary)
Attendance: 0
Referee: Sascha Stegemann (Germany)

12 November 2026
20:45

Albania	2–0	Finland
Muçi 35'; Manaj 50'	Report

Arena Kombëtare, Tirana
Attendance: 20,942
Referee: João Pinheiro (Portugal)
12 November 2026
20:45

San Marino	0–2	Belarus
	Report	Gomanov 13'; Kontesvoy 17'

San Marino Stadium, Serravalle
Attendance: 365
Referee: Goga Kikacheishvili (Georgia)

15 November 2026
18:00

Belarus	0–2	Albania
	Report	Manaj 28'; Hysaj 57'

Illovszky Rudolf Stadion, Budapest (Hungary)
Attendance: 0
Referee: Igor Pajač (Croatia)
15 November 2026
18:00 (19:00 UTC+2)

Finland	7–2	San Marino
Svanbäck 8', 20', 78'; Walta 17'; Pohjanpalo 36', 42'; Håkans 70'	Report	Nanni 26' (pen.), 76'

Töölö Football Stadium, Helsinki
Attendance: 7,153
Referee: Georgi Kabakov (Bulgaria)

=== Group 2 ===
Pos	Team	Pld	W	D	L	GF	GA	GD	Pts	Promotion or qualification	(Montenegro)	(Cyprus)	(Armenia)	(Latvia)
1	Montenegro (P)	6	5	1	0	13	6	+7	16	Promotion to League B	—	2–1	0–0	2–1
2	Cyprus	6	2	2	2	7	8	−1	8	Qualification for promotion play-offs	1–4	—	2–0	2–1
3	Armenia	6	1	3	2	5	6	−1	6		2–3	1–1	—	2–0
4	Latvia	6	0	2	4	3	8	−5	2		1–2	0–0	0–0	—

Source: UEFA
Rules for classification: Tiebreakers
(P) Promoted
25 September 2026
18:00 (20:00 UTC+4)

Armenia	2–0	Latvia
Arutyunyan 31'; Garibyan 75'	Report

Vazgen Sargsyan Republican Stadium, Yerevan
Attendance: 11,093
Referee: Martin Matoša (Slovenia)
25 September 2026
20:45

Montenegro	2–1	Cyprus
Krstović 66' (pen.); Osmajić 86'	Report	Edwards 55'

Podgorica City Stadium, Podgorica
Attendance: 6,726
Referee: Daniele Chiffi (Italy)

28 September 2026
18:00 (20:00 UTC+4)

Armenia	2–3	Montenegro
Serobyan 34'; Spertsyan 65'	Report	Piloyan 20' (o.g.); Krstović 38'; Latković 89'

Vazgen Sargsyan Republican Stadium, Yerevan
Attendance: 11,400
Referee: José Luis Munuera Montero (Spain)
28 September 2026
18:00 (19:00 UTC+3)

Latvia	0–0	Cyprus
	Report

Skonto Stadium, Riga
Attendance: 6,069
Referee: Michal Očenáš (Slovakia)

2 October 2026
18:00 (19:00 UTC+3)

Cyprus	2–0	Armenia
Konomis 19'; Kakoullis 31'	Report

GSP Stadium, Nicosia
Attendance: 3,456
Referee: Mohammad Al-Emara (Finland)
2 October 2026
18:00 (19:00 UTC+3)

Latvia	1–2	Montenegro
Strods 82'	Report	Adžić 3', 56'

Skonto Stadium, Riga
Attendance: 6,149
Referee: Radoslav Gidzhenov (Bulgaria)

5 October 2026
18:00 (19:00 UTC+3)

Cyprus	2–1	Latvia
Kosti 70'; Edwards 90+4'	Report	Dašķevičs 57'

GSP Stadium, Nicosia
Attendance: 2,354
Referee: Giorgi Kruashvili (Georgia)
5 October 2026
20:45

Montenegro	0–0	Armenia
	Report

Podgorica City Stadium, Podgorica
Attendance: 9,700
Referee: Manfredas Lukjančukas (Lithuania)

12 November 2026
18:00 (21:00 UTC+4)

Armenia	1–1	Cyprus
Garibyan 58'	Report	Pikis 9'

Vazgen Sargsyan Republican Stadium, Yerevan
Attendance: 7,000
Referee: Orel Grinfeld (Israel)
12 November 2026
20:45

Montenegro	2–1	Latvia
Krstović 70'; Maraš 90+1'	Report	Meļņiks 72'

Podgorica City Stadium, Podgorica
Attendance: 5,799
Referee: Jérôme Brisard (France)

15 November 2026
15:00 (16:00 UTC+2)

Cyprus	1–4	Montenegro
Pittas 52' (pen.)	Report	Osmajić 5'; Vukotić 58'; Krstović 67', 83'

Alphamega Stadium, Limassol
Attendance: 5,695
Referee: Sander van der Eijk (Netherlands)
15 November 2026
15:00 (16:00 UTC+2)

Latvia	0–0	Armenia
	Report

Skonto Stadium, Riga
Attendance: 5,355
Referee: Vasilios Fotias (Greece)

=== Group 3 ===
Pos	Team	Pld	W	D	L	GF	GA	GD	Pts	Promotion or qualification	(Slovakia)	(Faroe Islands)	(Moldova)	(Kazakhstan)
1	Slovakia (P)	6	3	3	0	13	6	+7	12	Promotion to League B	—	2–2	2–0	2–1
2	Faroe Islands	6	1	5	0	8	7	+1	8	Qualification for promotion play-offs	1–1	—	1–0	1–1
3	Moldova	6	2	1	3	5	10	−5	7		0–4	1–1	—	2–1
4	Kazakhstan	6	0	3	3	8	11	−3	3		2–2	2–2	1–2	—

Source: UEFA
Rules for classification: Tiebreakers
(P) Promoted
26 September 2026
18:00 (17:00 UTC+1)

Faroe Islands	1–1	Kazakhstan
Samuelsen 14'	Report	Yerlanov 26'

Tórsvøllur, Tórshavn
Attendance: 2,458
Referee: Ishmael Barbara (Malta)
26 September 2026
20:45

Slovakia	2–0	Moldova
Schranz 32'; Duda 40' (pen.)	Report

Tatran Stadium, Prešov
Attendance: 6,003
Referee: Juxhin Xhaja (Albania)

29 September 2026
18:00 (19:00 UTC+3)

Moldova	1–1	Faroe Islands
Perciun 66'	Report	Davidsen 27' (pen.)

Zimbru Stadium, Chișinău
Attendance: 4,542
Referee: Julian Weinberger (Austria)
29 September 2026
20:45

Slovakia	2–1	Kazakhstan
L. Sauer 26'; Hancko 82'	Report	Karimov 35'

Košická futbalová aréna, Košice
Attendance: 9,109
Referee: Patrik Kolarić (Croatia)

2 October 2026
16:00 (19:00 UTC+5)

Kazakhstan	1–2	Moldova
Alip 64'	Report	Cleșcenco 45+1'; Popescu 50'

Astana Arena, Astana
Attendance: 20,119
Referee: Marian Barbu (Romania)
2 October 2026
20:45 (19:45 UTC+1)

Faroe Islands	1–1	Slovakia
Justinussen 66'	Report	Vatnhamar 38' (o.g.)

Tórsvøllur, Tórshavn
Attendance: 2,853
Referee: Mohammed Al-Hakim (Sweden)

6 October 2026
16:00 (19:00 UTC+5)

Kazakhstan	2–2	Faroe Islands
Malyi 68'; Alip 76'	Report	Knudsen 22'; Turi 63'

Astana Arena, Astana
Attendance: 10,315
Referee: Kristo Tohver (Estonia)
6 October 2026
20:45 (21:45 UTC+3)

Moldova	0–4	Slovakia
	Report	Strelec 8'; Suslov 44'; Hancko 60'; Haraslín 75'

Zimbru Stadium, Chișinău
Attendance: 5,942
Referee: Yigal Frid (Israel)

13 November 2026
18:00 (19:00 UTC+2)

Moldova	2–1	Kazakhstan
Popescu 39', 77'	Report	Chesnokov 51'

Zimbru Stadium, Chișinău
Attendance: 6,783
Referee: Andrea Colombo (Italy)
13 November 2026
20:45

Slovakia	2–2	Faroe Islands
Prekop 17'; Haraslín 74'	Report	Davidsen 30' (pen.); Samuelsen 47'

Košická futbalová aréna, Košice
Attendance: 11,013
Referee: Mohammad Al-Emara (Finland)

16 November 2026
16:00 (15:00 UTC+0)

Faroe Islands	1–0	Moldova
Samuelsen 24'	Report

Tórsvøllur, Tórshavn
Attendance: 4,167
Referee: Enea Jorgji (Albania)
16 November 2026
16:00 (20:00 UTC+5)

Kazakhstan	2–2	Slovakia
Chesnokov 29'; Vorogovskiy 65'	Report	Boženík 56'; Kaprálik 90+5'

Astana Arena, Astana
Attendance: 13,877
Referee: Aliyar Aghayev (Azerbaijan)

=== Group 4 ===
Pos	Team	Pld	W	D	L	GF	GA	GD	Pts	Promotion or qualification	(Iceland)	(Estonia)	(Bulgaria)	(Luxembourg)
1	Iceland (P)	6	4	2	0	15	1	+14	14	Promotion to League B	—	1–1	3–0	3–0
2	Estonia	6	3	3	0	5	2	+3	12	Qualification for promotion play-offs	0–0	—	2–1	1–0
3	Bulgaria	6	1	1	4	4	12	−8	4		0–5	0–0	—	1–2
4	Luxembourg	6	1	0	5	2	11	−9	3		0–3	0–1	0–2	—

Source: UEFA
Rules for classification: Tiebreakers
(P) Promoted
26 September 2026
18:00 (19:00 UTC+3)

Bulgaria	1–2	Luxembourg
Chandarov 18'	Report	Barreiro 37'; V. Thill 65'

Hristo Botev Stadium, Plovdiv
Attendance: 4,300
Referee: Sander van der Eijk (Netherlands)
26 September 2026
18:00 (16:00 UTC+0)

Iceland	1–1	Estonia
Guðjohnsen 45'	Report	Paskotši 64'

Laugardalsvöllur, Reykjavík
Attendance: 5,320
Referee: Miloš Milanović (Serbia)

29 September 2026
20:45 (21:45 UTC+3)

Bulgaria	0–0	Estonia
	Report

Hristo Botev Stadium, Plovdiv
Attendance: 960
Referee: Goga Kikacheishvili (Georgia)
29 September 2026
20:45

Luxembourg	0–3	Iceland
	Report	Guðjohnsen 13'; Óskarsson 39'; Pálsson 73'

Stade de Luxembourg, Luxembourg City
Attendance: 8,879
Referee: Enea Jorgji (Albania)

3 October 2026
18:00 (19:00 UTC+3)

Estonia	1–0	Luxembourg
Peetson 5'	Report

Lilleküla Stadium, Tallinn
Attendance: 7,211
Referee: Paweł Raczkowski (Poland)
3 October 2026
18:00 (16:00 UTC+0)

Iceland	3–0	Bulgaria
Óskarsson 37', 60'; Ellertsson 90'	Report

Laugardalsvöllur, Reykjavík
Attendance: 5,069
Referee: Balázs Berke (Hungary)

6 October 2026
20:45 (21:45 UTC+3)

Estonia	0–0	Iceland
	Report

Lilleküla Stadium, Tallinn
Attendance: 5,987
Referee: David Dickinson (Scotland)
6 October 2026
20:45

Luxembourg	0–2	Bulgaria
	Report	Balov 19'; Iliev 34'

Stade de Luxembourg, Luxembourg City
Attendance: 8,027
Referee: Andris Treimanis (Latvia)

13 November 2026
20:45 (21:45 UTC+2)

Bulgaria	0–5	Iceland
	Report	Guðjohnsen 17' (pen.), 68', 79'; Óskarsson 21'; Tsenov 52' (o.g.)

Hristo Botev Stadium, Plovdiv
Attendance: 1,150
Referee: Florian Badstübner (Germany)
13 November 2026
20:45

Luxembourg	0–1	Estonia
	Report	Paskotši 42'

Stade de Luxembourg, Luxembourg City
Attendance: 9,214
Referee: Ishmael Barbara (Malta)

16 November 2026
18:00 (19:00 UTC+2)

Estonia	2−1	Bulgaria
Kristal 8'; Palumets 60'	Report	Kovachev 45+1'

Lilleküla Stadium, Tallinn
Attendance: 8,006
Referee: Nenad Minaković (Serbia)
16 November 2026
18:00 (17:00 UTC+0)

Iceland	3−0	Luxembourg
Willumsson 25'; Guðjohnsen 37' (pen.); Ellertsson 50'	Report

Laugardalsvöllur, Reykjavík
Attendance: 2,644
Referee: Marian Barbu (Romania)

== Goalscorers ==
There were 126 goals scored in 48 matches, for an average of 2.62 goals per match.

6 goals

- (Iceland national football team) Andri Guðjohnsen

5 goals

- (Finland national football team) Joel Pohjanpalo
- (Finland national football team) Leo Walta
- (Montenegro national football team) Nikola Krstović

4 goals

- (Albania national football team) Rei Manaj
- (Finland national football team) Adrian Svanbäck
- (Iceland national football team) Orri Óskarsson

3 goals

- (Albania national football team) Kristjan Asllani
- (Belarus national football team) Artem Kontsevoy
- (Faroe Islands national football team) Áki Samuelsen
- (Moldova national football team) Petru Popescu

2 goals

- (Albania national football team) Ernest Muçi
- (Armenia national football team) Artur Garibyan
- (Belarus national football team) Artyom Shumansky
- (Cyprus national football team) Marcus Edwards
- (Estonia national football team) Maksim Paskotši
- (Faroe Islands national football team) Viljormur Davidsen
- (Iceland national football team) Mikael Egill Ellertsson
- (Kazakhstan national football team) Nuraly Alip
- (Kazakhstan national football team) Islam Chesnokov
- (Montenegro national football team) Vasilije Adžić
- (Montenegro national football team) Milutin Osmajić
- (San Marino national football team) Nicola Nanni
- (Slovakia national football team) Dávid Hancko
- (Slovakia national football team) Lukáš Haraslín

1 goal

- (Albania national football team) Elseid Hysaj
- (Albania national football team) Anis Mehmeti
- (Albania national football team) Myrto Uzuni
- (Armenia national football team) Georgy Arutyunyan
- (Armenia national football team) Artur Serobyan
- (Armenia national football team) Eduard Spertsyan
- (Belarus national football team) Max Ebong
- (Belarus national football team) Kirill Gomanov
- (Bulgaria national football team) Kristiyan Balov
- (Bulgaria national football team) Asen Chandarov
- (Bulgaria national football team) Atanas Iliev
- (Bulgaria national football team) Svetoslav Kovachev
- (Cyprus national football team) Andronikos Kakoullis
- (Cyprus national football team) Leonidas Konomis
- (Cyprus national football team) Ioannis Kosti
- (Cyprus national football team) Iasonas Pikis
- (Cyprus national football team) Ioannis Pittas
- (Estonia national football team) Patrik Kristal
- (Estonia national football team) Kevor Palumets
- (Estonia national football team) Rasmus Peetson
- (Faroe Islands national football team) Géza Dávid Turi
- (Faroe Islands national football team) Adrian Justinussen
- (Faroe Islands national football team) Petur Knudsen
- (Finland national football team) Daniel Håkans
- (Finland national football team) Benjamin Källman
- (Iceland national football team) Victor Pálsson
- (Iceland national football team) Brynjólfur Willumsson
- (Kazakhstan national football team) Ramazan Karimov
- (Kazakhstan national football team) Serhiy Malyi
- (Kazakhstan national football team) Yan Vorogovsky
- (Kazakhstan national football team) Temirlan Yerlanov
- (Latvia national football team) Eduards Dašķevičs
- (Latvia national football team) Deniss Meļņiks
- (Latvia national football team) Markuss Strods
- (Luxembourg national football team) Leandro Barreiro
- (Luxembourg national football team) Vincent Thill
- (Moldova national football team) Nicky Cleșcenco
- (Moldova national football team) Sergiu Perciun
- (Montenegro national football team) Aleksa Latković
- (Montenegro national football team) Aleksa Maraš
- (Montenegro national football team) Milan Vukotić
- (San Marino national football team) Lorenzo Lazzari
- (Slovakia national football team) Róbert Boženík
- (Slovakia national football team) Ondrej Duda
- (Slovakia national football team) Adrián Kaprálik
- (Slovakia national football team) Erik Prekop
- (Slovakia national football team) Leo Sauer
- (Slovakia national football team) Ivan Schranz
- (Slovakia national football team) David Strelec
- (Slovakia national football team) Tomáš Suslov

1 own goal

- (Armenia national football team) Erik Piloyan (against Montenegro)
- (Bulgaria national football team) Emil Tsenov (against Iceland)
- (Faroe Islands national football team) Gunnar Vatnhamar (against Slovakia)

== Overall ranking ==
Following the league phase, the 16 League C teams were ordered 33rd to 48th in an interim overall ranking for the 2026–27 UEFA Nations League according to the following rules:

- The teams finishing first in the groups were ranked 33rd to 36th according to the results of the league phase.
- The teams finishing second in the groups were ranked 37th to 40th according to the results of the league phase.
- The teams finishing third in the groups were ranked 41st to 44th according to the results of the league phase.
- The teams finishing fourth in the groups were ranked 45th to 48th according to the results of the league phase.

Rnk	Grp	Team	Pld	W	D	L	GF	GA	GD	Pts
33	C2	Montenegro	6	5	1	0	13	6	+7	16
34	C1	Albania	6	5	0	1	12	3	+9	15
35	C4	Iceland	6	4	2	0	15	1	+14	14
36	C3	Slovakia	6	3	3	0	13	6	+7	12
37	C4	Estonia	6	3	3	0	5	2	+3	12
38	C1	Belarus	6	3	1	2	7	4	+3	10
39	C3	Faroe Islands	6	1	5	0	8	7	+1	8
40	C2	Cyprus	6	2	2	2	7	8	−1	8
41	C1	Finland	6	3	1	2	16	6	+10	10
42	C3	Moldova	6	2	1	3	5	10	−5	7
43	C2	Armenia	6	1	3	2	5	6	−1	6
44	C4	Bulgaria	6	1	1	4	4	12	−8	4
45	C3	Kazakhstan	6	0	3	3	8	11	−3	3
46	C4	Luxembourg	6	1	0	5	2	11	−9	3
47	C2	Latvia	6	0	2	4	3	8	−5	2
48	C1	San Marino	6	0	0	6	3	25	−22	0

Source: UEFA
Rules for classification: Ranking criteria

A final overall ranking will also be compiled, though this is only used to rank teams within their new leagues for the following edition of the competition.
