= Viljormur Davidsen =

Faroese footballer (born 1991)

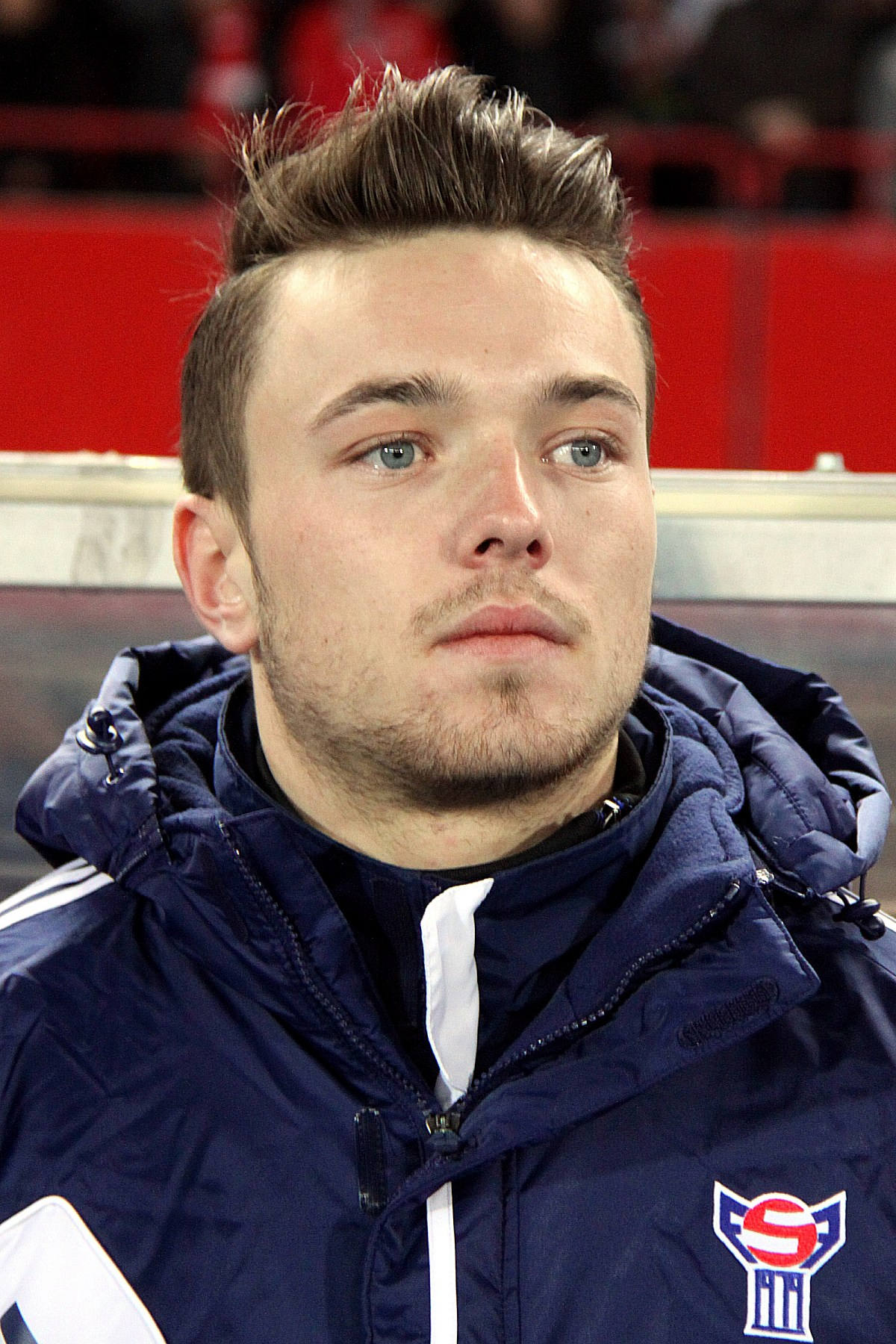
- Davidsen with the Faroe Islands in 2013

Personal information
- Full name: Viljormur í Heiðunum Davidsen
- Date of birth: 19 July 1991 (age 35)
- Place of birth: Runavík, Faroe Islands
- Height: 1.77 m (5 ft 10 in)
- Position: Left-back

Team information
- Current team: NSÍ
- Number: 3

Youth career
- –2007: NSÍ
- 2007–2010: OB

Senior career*
| Years | Team | Apps | (Gls) |
| 2010–2012 | Fyn | 19 | (0) |
| 2012 | NSÍ | 3 | (0) |
| 2012 | Jerv | 8 | (0) |
| 2013 | Fredericia | 7 | (0) |
| 2013–2022 | Vejle | 195 | (5) |
| 2022 | Helsingborgs IF | 28 | (0) |
| 2023–2025 | HB Torshavn | 70 | (1) |
| 2026– | NSÍ | 27 | (1) |

International career^{‡}
| 2006–2007 | Faroe Islands U17 | 14 | (1) |
| 2008–2009 | Faroe Islands U19 | 5 | (0) |
| 2009–2012 | Faroe Islands U21 | 8 | (0) |
| 2013– | Faroe Islands | 98 | (8) |
- * Club domestic league appearances and goals as of 17:40, 1 November 2026 (UTC) ‡ National team caps and goals as of 20:53, 16 November 2026 (UTC)

Viljormur í Heiðunum Davidsen (born 19 July 1991) is a Faroese footballer who plays as a left-back for Faroe Islands Premier League club NSÍ Runavík and the Faroe Islands national team.

== Club career ==
Davidsen started his career with FC Fyn in the Danish 1st Division. He had a brief stint at NSÍ Runavík in 2012, but only played three matches, transferring to Norwegian club FK Jerv. After that, he returned to Denmark, moving to FC Fredericia for the remainder of the 2012–13 season.

In August 2013, Davidsen moved to Vejle Boldklub, where he became a key player, making more than 200 appearances for the club.

On 17 January 2022, Davidsen signed a two-year contract with newly promoted Allsvenskan club Helsingborgs IF. Although he received the club's captain armband during his spell in Sweden, he faced relegation at the end of the 2022 season. In November of the same year, he terminated his contract with the club by mutual consent.

On 5 January 2023, Davidsen officially joined HB Torshavn on a free transfer, signing a three-year deal with the Faroese club and returning to his country of birth after eleven years spent abroad.

== International career ==
A former player of the under-17, under-19 and under-21 teams, Davidsen made his debut for the Faroese senior national team in a friendly against Iceland in 2013. He scored his first goal on 26 March 2019 against Romania in 4–1 away defeat for the UEFA Euro 2020 qualifying.

== Personal life ==
Davidsen works as a dealer in a car showroom while also playing football.

== Career statistics ==
=== International ===
Scores and results list the Faroe Islands' goal tally first, score column indicates score after each Davidsen goal.'

List of international goals scored by Viljormur Davidsen
| No. | Date | Venue | Opponent | Score | Result | Competition |
|---|---|---|---|---|---|---|
| 1 | 26 March 2019 | Stadionul Dr. Constantin Rădulescu, Cluj-Napoca, Romania | Romania | 1–3 | 1–4 | UEFA Euro 2020 qualifying |
| 2 | 7 June 2021 | Tórsvøllur, Tórshavn, Faroe Islands | Liechtenstein | 5–1 | 5–1 | Friendly |
| 3 | 11 June 2022 | Tórsvøllur, Tórshavn, Faroe Islands | Lithuania | 1–1 | 2–1 | 2022–23 UEFA Nations League C |
| 4 | 25 September 2022 | Tórsvøllur, Tórshavn, Faroe Islands | Turkey | 1–0 | 2–1 | 2022–23 UEFA Nations League C |
| 5 | 7 September 2024 | Tórsvøllur, Tórshavn, Faroe Islands | North Macedonia | 1–0 | 1–1 | 2024–25 UEFA Nations League C |
| 6 | 14 November 2024 | Vazgen Sargsyan Republican Stadium, Yerevan, Armenia | Armenia | 1-0 | 1–0 | 2024–25 UEFA Nations League C |
| 7 | 29 September 2026 | Stadionul Zimbru, Chișinău, Moldova | Moldova | 1-0 | 1–1 | 2026–27 UEFA Nations League C |
| 8 | 13 November 2026 | Košická futbalová aréna, Košice, Slovakia | Slovakia | 1-1 | 2–2 | 2026–27 UEFA Nations League C |

== Honours ==
FC Fyn

- Danish 2nd Division: 2011–12

Vejle

- Danish 1st Division: 2017–18, 2019–20

NSÍ

- Faroe Islands Premier League: 2026
