= Adrian Svanbäck =

Finnish footballer (born 2004)

Personal information
- Full name: Adrian Lars Fredrik Svanbäck
- Date of birth: 8 June 2004 (age 22)
- Place of birth: Jakobstad, Finland
- Position: Forward

Team information
- Current team: Häcken
- Number: 20

Youth career
- 2009–2023: Helsingborg

Senior career*
Years	Team	Apps	(Gls)
2023–2025	Helsingborg	41	(10)
2025–	Häcken	42	(13)

International career^{‡}
2022	Finland U18	3	(0)
2025	Finland U21	2	(4)
2026–	Finland	5	(4)
- * Club domestic league appearances and goals as of 21:54, 18 November 2026 (UTC) ‡ National team caps and goals as of 15 November 2026

Adrian Lars Fredrik Svanbäck (born 8 June 2004) is a Finnish professional footballer who plays as a forward or midfielder for Allsvenskan club Häcken and the Finland national team.

== Club career ==
On 21 May 2024, Svanbäck extended his contract with Helsingborg until the end of 2027.

On 19 May 2025, Svanbäck scored a derby goal for Helsingborgs IF against local Scanian rivals Landskrona BoIS. His father Fredrik Svanbäck had also previously played for both clubs consecutively.

On 29 June 2025, his contract with Allsvenskan club BK Häcken was announced. Svanbäck signed a deal until the end of 2029 for an undisclosed fee.

On 31 July, Svanbäck's goal against Anderlecht helped turn the second leg of the second round of the 2025–26 UEFA Europa League qualifying in Häcken's favour, and the Swedish side progressed to the third round.

== International career ==
Svanbäck has made three appearances for the Finland U18 national team in 2022.

He received a call-up to the Finland U21 national team for the UEFA Euro qualification matches against San Marino and Cyprus in September 2025. On 4 September, Svanbäck scored a hat-trick in Finland's 7–0 win over San Marino.

On 26 September 2026, Svanbäck's made his debut for the Finland national team in a 2026–27 UEFA Nations League C game against San Marino. He scored the second goal in a 7–0 victory.

== Personal life ==
His father Fredrik is a Finnish former international footballer who played in Finland and Sweden for Jaro, Helsingborg and Landskrona BoIS. Svanbäck was born in Finland but was raised in Sweden since the age of one. He holds a dual citizenship.

== Career statistics ==
=== Club ===
As of match played 8 November 2026

Appearances and goals by club, season and competition
Club	Season	League			Svenska Cupen		Continental		Other		Total	
Club	Season	Division	Apps	Goals	Apps	Goals	Apps	Goals	Apps	Goals	Apps	Goals
Helsingborg	2023	Superettan	1	0	0	0	—		—		1	0
Helsingborg	2024	Superettan	27	6	2	0	—		—		29	6
Helsingborg	2025	Superettan	13	4	3	0	—		—		16	4
Helsingborg	Total		41	10	5	0	—		—		46	10
Häcken	2025	Allsvenskan	14	5	3	3	13 (Note: Six appearances and one goal in UEFA Europa League, seven appearances and one goal in UEFA Conference League)	2	—		30	10
Häcken	2026	Allsvenskan	28	8	1	1	—		—		29	9
Häcken	Total		42	13	4	4	13	2	—		59	19
Career total			83	23	9	4	13	2	0	0	105	29

=== International ===
As of match played 15 November 2026

National team	Year	Competitive		Friendly		Total	
National team	Year	Apps	Goals	Apps	Goals	Apps	Goals
Finland	2026	5 (Note: Appearances in the 2026–27 UEFA Nations League C)	4	0	0	5	4
Total		5	4	0	0	5	4

Scores and results list Finland's goal tally first, score column indicates score after each Svanbäck goal.

List of international goals scored by Adrian Svanbäck
No.	Date	Venue	Opponent	Score	Result	Competition
1	26 September 2026	San Marino Stadium, Serravalle, San Marino	San Marino	2–0	7–0	2026–27 UEFA Nations League C
2	15 November 2026	Bolt Arena, Helsinki, Finland	San Marino	1–0	7–2	2026–27 UEFA Nations League C
3	15 November 2026	Bolt Arena, Helsinki, Finland	San Marino	3–0	7–2	2026–27 UEFA Nations League C
4	15 November 2026	Bolt Arena, Helsinki, Finland	San Marino	7–2	7–2	2026–27 UEFA Nations League C
