= Áki Samuelsen =

Faroese footballer

Personal information
- Full name: Áki Debes Samuelsen
- Date of birth: 17 April 2004 (age 22)
- Place of birth: Torshavn, Faroe Islands
- Height: 1.74 m (5 ft 9 in)
- Position: Forward

Team information
- Current team: Mjällby
- Number: 23

Youth career
- –2019: HB
- 2019–2020: FC Midtjylland

Senior career*
Years	Team	Apps	(Gls)
2020–2025	HB	91	(28)
2025	Ranheim	28	(9)
2025–	Mjällby	21	(2)

International career^{‡}
2017–2018	Faroe Islands U15	3	(0)
2019	Faroe Islands U17	9	(0)
2021–2022	Faroe Islands U19	9	(4)
2021–	Faroe Islands U21	20	(2)
2026–	Faroe Islands	8	(3)
- * Club domestic league appearances and goals as of 21 November 2026 ‡ National team caps and goals as of 16 November 2026

Áki Debes Samuelsen (born 17 April 2004) is a Faroese professional footballer who plays as a forward for Allsvenskan team Mjällby and the Faroe Islands national team.

== Career ==
Samuelsen began his career at the youth academy of Havnar Bóltfelag, before moving to FC Midtjylland's youth setup in 2019 at the age of 15. He spent a year in Denmark before returning to HB in 2020. He made his debut for the club at the age of 16, scored his first league goal at 17, and became a full-time starter by 18. In the 2024 Betrideildin season, Samuelsen scored 12 goals, leading the team; he scored a hat-trick against KÍ in June. He signed for Norwegian team Ranheim Fotball in January 2025.

On 28 December 2025, Samuelsen signed for Allsvenskan club Mjällby on a contract until the 2030 season.

== International career ==
Samuelsen made his debut for the Faroe Islands U-21s in 2021. This made him the youngest player to represent the U-21s in Faroese history. He made his debut for the Faroe Islands national team at the 2026 Baltic Cup.

=== International ===
As of match played on 16 November 2026

Appearances and goals by national team and year
National team	Year	Apps	Goals
Faroe Islands	2026	8	3
Total		8	3

Scores and results list Faroe Islands's goal tally first.

List of international goals scored by Áki Samuelsen
No.	Date	Venue	Opponent	Score	Result	Competition
1	26 September 2026	Tórsvøllur, Tórshavn, Faroe Islands	Kazakhstan	1–0	1–1	2026–27 UEFA Nations League C
2	13 November 2026	Košická futbalová aréna, Košice, Slovakia	Slovakia	2–1	2–2	2026–27 UEFA Nations League C
3	16 November 2026	Tórsvøllur, Tórshavn, Faroe Islands	Moldova	1–0	1–0	2026–27 UEFA Nations League C

== Honours ==
Mjällby

- Svenska Cupen: 2025–26
