= Arttu Hoskonen =

Finnish footballer (born 1997)

Personal information
- Full name: Arttu Hermanni Hoskonen
- Date of birth: 16 April 1997 (age 29)
- Place of birth: Kaarina, Finland
- Height: 1.88 m (6 ft 2 in)
- Position: Centre-back

Team information
- Current team: Lyngby
- Number: 27

Youth career
- KaaPo
- 2010–2016: Inter Turku

Senior career*
Years	Team	Apps	(Gls)
2016–2021	Inter Turku	95	(2)
2022	HJK	21	(3)
2022	→ Klubi 04	1	(0)
2023–2025	Cracovia	50	(2)
2024–2025	Cracovia II	3	(0)
2025–2026	Stockport County	0	(0)
2026–	Lyngby	0	(0)

International career^{‡}
2016	Finland U20	1	(0)
2022–	Finland	18	(1)
- * Club domestic league appearances and goals as of 7 September 2026 ‡ National team caps and goals as of 11:33, 8 June 2025 (UTC)

Arttu Hermani Hoskonen (born 16 April 1997) is a Finnish professional footballer who plays as a centre-back for Danish Superliga side Lyngby and the Finland national team.

== Career ==
Born in Kaarina, Hoskonen started playing football in the youth sector of local club Kaarinan Pojat (KaaPo), and joined Inter Turku when aged 13.

=== Inter Turku ===
He started his professional career in 2016 with Inter Turku first team, and ultimately spent six seasons with the club in Finnish top-tier Veikkausliiga.

=== HJK Helsinki ===
On 8 November 2021, Hoskonen signed a two-year contract with reigning champions HJK Helsinki, starting in 2022. He suffered an injury in the early 2022, but after recovering, he made 21 appearances in the league, scoring three goals. During his lone season with HJK, he also made 13 appearances in the club's 2022–23 European campaign, representing HJK in the UEFA Europa League group stage in all six matches.

=== Cracovia ===
On 23 January 2023, Hoskonen joined Polish Ekstraklasa club Cracovia on a two-and-a-half-year contract, for an undisclosed fee, rumoured to be €250,000. He debuted in Ekstraklasa on 17 February 2023, in a win against Stal Mielec. In the next game on 25 February 2023, Hoskonen scored his first goal in the league, in a 2–1 home loss against Piast Gliwice.

In mid-May 2025, it was announced that Hoskonen would leave Cracovia after the 2024–25 season.

=== Stockport County ===
On 21 July 2025, Hoskonen signed for EFL League One club Stockport County, becoming the fourth Finnish player to play for the club, after Shefki Kuqi, Jarkko Wiss and Petri Helin. He missed the entire 2025–26 season through injury. He left the club by mutual consent on 31 August 2026, having made one cup appearance for the club.

=== Lyngby BK ===
On 7 September 2026, Hoskonen signed with Danish Superliga side Lyngby.

== International career ==
Hoskonen made his international debut with Finland senior national team on 17 November 2022, in a friendly match against North Macedonia. He scored his first goal for the national team on 13 October 2024, in a UEFA Nations League B match against England at the Helsinki Olympic Stadium.

== Career statistics ==
=== Club ===
As of match played 11 May 2025

Appearances and goals by club, season and competition
Club	Season	League			National cup (Note: Includes Finnish Cup, Polish Cup)		League cup (Note: Includes Finnish League Cup)		Other		Total	
Club	Season	Division	Apps	Goals	Apps	Goals	Apps	Goals	Apps	Goals	Apps	Goals
Inter Turku	2016	Veikkausliiga	18	0	0	0	0	0	—		18	0
Inter Turku	2017	Veikkausliiga	6	0	0	0	—		—		6	0
Inter Turku	2018	Veikkausliiga	25	1	6	1	—		—		31	2
Inter Turku	2019	Veikkausliiga	16	0	4	0	—		1 (Note: Appearance in UEFA Europa League)	0	21	0
Inter Turku	2020	Veikkausliiga	17	1	9	0	—		1	0	27	1
Inter Turku	2021	Veikkausliiga	13	0	5	1	—		2 (Note: Appearances in UEFA Europa Conference League)	0	20	1
Inter Turku	Total		95	2	24	2	0	0	4	0	123	4
HJK	2022	Veikkausliiga	21	3	2	0	0	0	13 (Note: Appearances in UEFA Champions League and UEFA Europa League)	0	36	3
Klubi 04	2022	Kakkonen	1	0	—		—		—		1	0
Cracovia	2022–23	Ekstraklasa	11	1	0	0	—		—		11	1
Cracovia	2023–24	Ekstraklasa	26	1	3	0	—		—		29	1
Cracovia	2024–25	Ekstraklasa	13	0	1	0	—		—		14	0
Cracovia	Total		50	2	4	0	0	0	0	0	54	2
Cracovia II	2024–25	IV liga Lesser Poland	3	0	—		—		—		3	0
Stockport County	2025–26	League One	0	0	0	0	0	0	—		0	0
Career total			170	7	30	2	0	0	17	0	217	9

=== International ===
As of match played 7 June 2025

Appearances and goals by national team and year
National team	Year	Apps	Goals
Finland
Finland	2022	2	0
Finland	2023	7	0
Finland	2024	8	1
Finland	2025	1	0
Total		18	1

As of match played 13 October 2024. Finland score listed first, score column indicates score after each Hoskonen goal.

List of international goals scored by Arttu Hoskonen
No.	Date	Venue	Opponent	Score	Result	Competition
1	13 October 2024	Helsinki Olympic Stadium, Helsinki, Finland	England	1–3	1–3	2024–25 UEFA Nations League B

== Honours ==
Inter Turku

- Finnish Cup: 2017–18

HJK

- Veikkausliiga: 2022

Cracovia II

- IV liga Lesser Poland: 2024–25
