= Julian Weinberger =

Austrian football referee (born 1985)

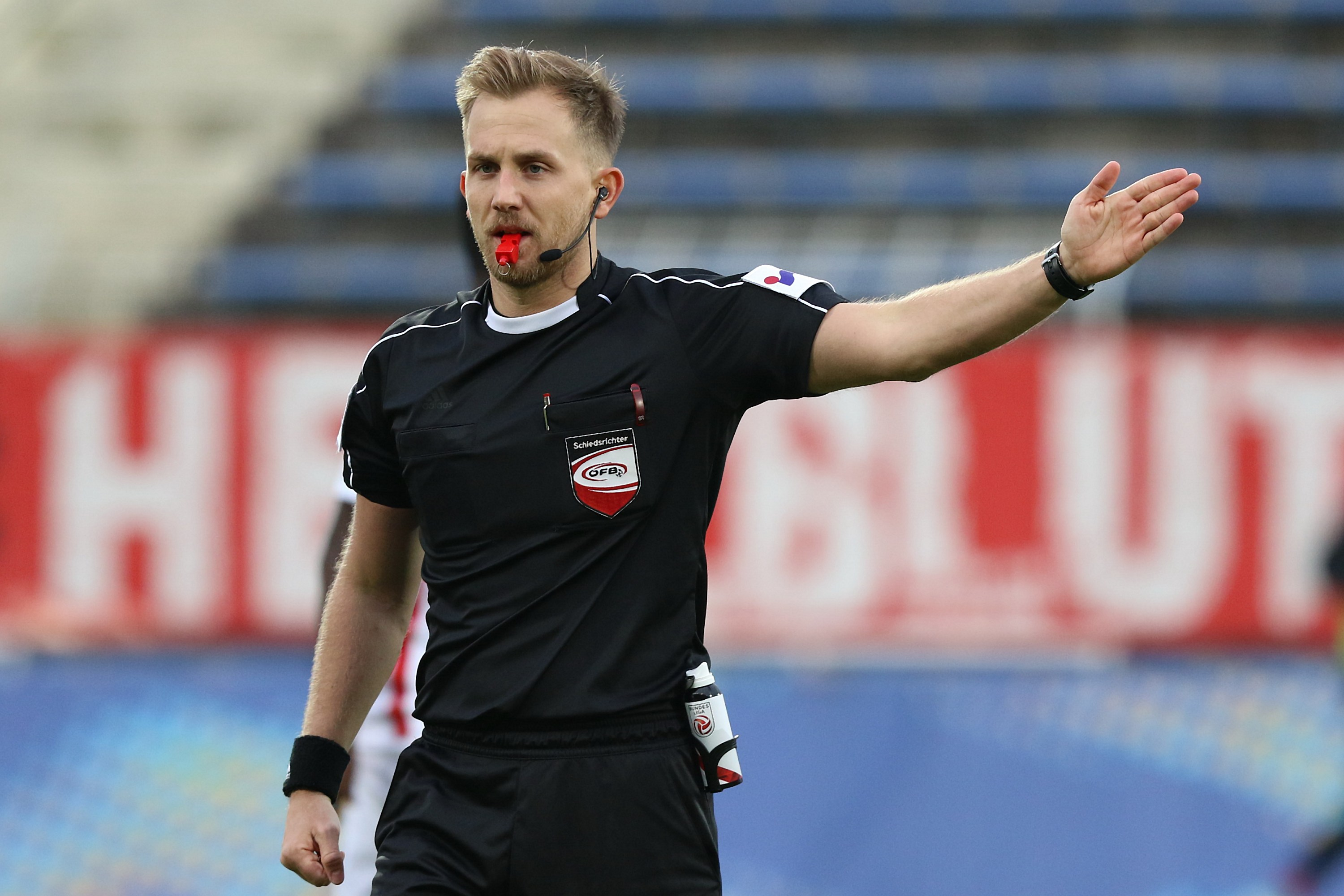
- Weinberger in 2017
- Full name: Julian Weinberger
- Born: 14 February 1985 (age 41); Vienna, Austria
- Other occupation: Police officer

Domestic
Years	League	Role
2011–present	2. Liga	Referee
2015–present	Bundesliga	Referee

International
Years	League	Role
2018–present	FIFA listed	Referee

Julian Weinberger (born 14 February 1985) is an Austrian football referee.

== Career ==
Weinberger began his refereeing career at the age of 15 and ascended to officiating regional league matches in 2008. Since March 2011, Weinberger has officiated matches in the 2. Liga and since March 2015 in the Bundesliga. In August 2010, Weinberger made his debut in the Austrian Cup and, on 16 September 2018, he officiated his first Vienna derby between SK Rapid Wien and FK Austria Wien.

In November 2010, during a match between Union St. Florian and Grazer AK in Enns, Weinberger suspended the game following an attack on assistant referee Werner Meixner, who was injured by Grazer's supporters who threw beer bottles at him. As a result, Meixner was taken to hospital with a severe cut in his face.

Since 2018, Weinberger has been on the FIFA list of referees and has officiated international football matches.

In the 2021–22 season, Weinberger officiated his first UEFA Conference League match. He has also refereed matches in the UEFA Nations League, in the European World Cup qualifiers for the 2022 FIFA World Cup in Qatar and for the 2026 FIFA World Cup, as well as in friendly matches.

In addition, Weinberger was a goal-line referee for Harald Lechner's team at the 2017 UEFA European Under-21 Championship in Poland.

Weinberger has been a police officer with the Federal Police in Vienna since 2007 and is currently a precinct inspector.
