= 2024–25 UEFA Nations League =

Tournament details
- Dates: League phase: 5 September – 19 November 2024; League A quarter-finals, and League A/B and B/C play-offs: 20–23 March 2025; Nations League Finals: 4–8 June 2025; League C/D play-offs: 26–31 March 2026
- Teams: 54

Final positions
- Champions: Portugal (2nd title)
- Runners-up: Spain
- Third place: France
- Fourth place: Germany

Tournament statistics
- Matches played: 188
- Goals scored: 505 (2.69 per match) (Note: The goal tally takes into account the original result of fixtures that were subsequently forfeited, not the awarded scoreline.)
- Attendance: 4,384,892 (23,324 per match)
- Top scorer(s): (Sweden) Viktor Gyökeres (9 goals)

The 2024–25 UEFA Nations League was the fourth season of the UEFA Nations League tournament, an international association football competition involving the men's national teams of the member associations of UEFA. The competition was held from September to November 2024 (league phase), March 2025 (League A quarter-finals and both League A/B and B/C play-offs), June 2025 (Nations League Finals), and March 2026 (League C/D play-offs).

Spain were the defending champions, having won the 2023 finals. Portugal won the final against Spain, 5–3 on penalties following a 2–2 draw after extra time, for their second UEFA Nations League title.

== Format ==
The UEFA national teams were divided into four leagues, with Leagues A, B, and C featuring 16 teams each, divided into four groups of four teams, while League D featured 6 teams divided into two groups of three. The teams were allocated to leagues based on the 2022–23 UEFA Nations League overall ranking. Each team played six matches within their group, except for teams in League D which played four, using the home-and-away round-robin format on double matchdays in September, October and November 2024.

On 25 January 2023, the UEFA Executive Committee confirmed an altered format for the Nations League following the league phase. In the top division, League A, the group winners and runners-up advanced to a new quarter-final round, played home-and-away over two legs in March 2025. In each tie, group winners faced a runner-up from a different group, with the group winner hosting the second leg. The four quarter-final winners qualified for the Nations League Finals, retaining its previous format, which will be played in a knockout format, consisting of the semi-finals, third place play-off and final. The semi-final pairings are determined by means of a draw. The host country for the Nations League Finals was selected from among the four qualified teams by the UEFA Executive Committee, with the winners of the final crowned as the Nations League champions.

For the first time, teams also competed in separate play-offs for promotion and relegation to a higher or lower league, whereas in previous editions it was only based on standings. The group winners in Leagues B, C, and D were directly promoted, while the last-placed teams of each group in Leagues A and B were directly relegated. As League C had four groups while League D had only two, the two lowest-ranked League C teams were automatically relegated (a change from the previous editions, which featured relegation play-outs between the fourth-placed teams of League C). As part of the format change, promotion/relegation play-offs were introduced, with the third-placed teams of League A facing the runners-up of League B, the third-placed teams of League B facing the runners-up of League C, and the two best-ranked fourth-placed teams of League C facing the runners-up of League D. The matches were scheduled to be played home-and-away over two legs in March 2025 (League A/B and B/C) and March 2026 (League C/D), with the winners going to the higher league and the losers entering the lower league.

In all two-legged ties, the higher-ranked teams hosted the second leg. The team that scored more goals on aggregate was the winner. If the aggregate score was level, extra time was played (the away goals rule was not applied). If the score remained level after extra time, a penalty shoot-out was used to decide the winner.

=== 2026 FIFA World Cup qualification ===
The 2024–25 Nations League was partially linked with European qualification for the 2026 FIFA World Cup, with the format confirmed by the UEFA Executive Committee during their meeting in Nyon, Switzerland, on 28 June 2023. The twelve group winners of FIFA World Cup qualification after the first round (group stage) qualified directly for the World Cup. Then, the second round (play-offs) was contested by the twelve group runners-up, along with the four best Nations League group winners, based on the Nations League overall ranking, that finished outside the top two of their qualifying group. The play-offs were split into four play-off paths, played in two single-match knockout rounds (semi-finals and finals, with the home teams to be drawn), from which an additional four teams also qualified.

== Tiebreakers ==
=== Tiebreakers for group ranking ===
If two or more teams in the same group were equal on points on completion of the league phase, the following tie-breaking criteria were applied:

1. Higher number of points obtained in the matches played among the teams in question;
2. Higher goal difference in matches played among the teams in question;
3. Higher number of goals scored in the matches played among the teams in question;
4. If, after having applied criteria 1 to 3, teams still had an equal ranking, criteria 1 to 3 were reapplied exclusively to the matches between the teams in question to determine their final rankings. (Note: When two or more teams were tied in points, criteria 1 to 3 were applied. After these criteria were applied, they may have defined the position of some of the teams involved, but not all of them. For example, if there was a three-way tie on points, the application of the first three criteria may only have broken the tie for one of the teams, leaving the other two teams still tied. In this case, the tiebreaking procedure was resumed, from the beginning, for those teams that were still tied.) If this procedure did not lead to a decision, criteria 5 to 11 applied;
5. Higher goal difference in all group matches;
6. Higher number of goals scored in all group matches;
7. Higher number of away goals scored in all group matches;
8. Higher number of wins in all group matches;
9. Higher number of away wins in all group matches;
10. Lower disciplinary points total in all group matches (1 point for a single yellow card, 3 points for a red card as a consequence of two yellow cards, 3 points for a direct red card, 4 points for a yellow card followed by a direct red card).
11. Higher position in the 2024–25 UEFA Nations League access list.

=== Criteria for league ranking ===
Individual league rankings were established according to the following criteria:

1. Position in the group;
2. Higher number of points;
3. Higher goal difference;
4. Higher number of goals scored;
5. Higher number of goals scored away from home;
6. Higher number of wins;
7. Higher number of wins away from home;
8. Lower disciplinary points total (1 point for a single yellow card, 3 points for a red card as a consequence of two yellow cards, 3 points for a direct red card, 4 points for a yellow card followed by a direct red card).
9. Higher position in the 2024–25 UEFA Nations League access list.

=== Criteria for interim overall ranking ===
Following the completion of the league phase, the interim overall UEFA Nations League rankings were established as follows:

1. The 16 League A teams were ranked 1st to 16th according to their league rankings.
2. The 16 League B teams were ranked 17th to 32nd according to their league rankings.
3. The 16 League C teams were ranked 33rd to 48th according to their league rankings.
4. The 6 League D teams were ranked 49th to 54th according to their league rankings.

=== Criteria for final overall ranking ===
Following the completion of the League A knockout stage and promotion/relegation play-offs, the final overall UEFA Nations League rankings were established. Within each of the groups listed below, teams were ordered based on their interim overall ranking.

1. The four Nations League Finals participants were ranked 1st to 4th in order of winner, runner-up, and third place play-off winner and loser.
2. The four League A quarter-final losers were ranked 5th to 8th.
3. The four teams directly promoted to League A, and the four winners of the League A/B play-offs, were ranked 9th to 16th.
4. The four teams directly relegated to League B, and the four losers of the League A/B play-offs, were ranked 17th to 24th.
5. The four teams directly promoted to League B, and the four winners of the League B/C play-offs, were ranked 25th to 32nd.
6. The four teams directly relegated to League C, and the four losers of the League B/C play-offs, were ranked 33rd to 40th.
7. The four League C third-placed teams remained ranked 41st to 44th.
8. The two teams directly promoted to League C, and the two winners of the League C/D play-offs, were ranked 45th to 48th.
9. The two teams directly relegated to League D, and the two losers of the League C/D play-offs, were ranked 49th to 52nd.
10. The two League D third-placed teams remained ranked 53rd and 54th.

== Schedule ==
Below was the schedule of the 2024–25 UEFA Nations League.

To allow for enough teams to participate in the start of the 2026 FIFA World Cup qualification group stage in March 2025, the League C/D promotion/relegation play-offs were played in March 2026. However, if any of the teams due to participate in these ties had advanced to the World Cup play-offs in March 2026, the League C/D promotion/relegation play-offs would have been cancelled, and all teams would have remained in their respective leagues for the following edition.

Stage	Round	Dates
League phase	Matchday 1	5–7 September 2024
League phase	Matchday 2	8–10 September 2024
League phase	Matchday 3	10–12 October 2024
League phase	Matchday 4	13–15 October 2024
League phase	Matchday 5	14–16 November 2024
League phase	Matchday 6	17–19 November 2024
League A quarter-finals, and League A/B and B/C play-offs	First leg	20 March 2025
League A quarter-finals, and League A/B and B/C play-offs	Second leg	23 March 2025
Finals	Semi-finals	4–5 June 2025
Finals	Third place play-off	8 June 2025
Finals	Final	8 June 2025
League C/D play-offs	First leg	26 March 2026
League C/D play-offs	Second leg	31 March 2026

The fixture list was confirmed by UEFA on 9 February 2024, the day following the draw.

== Seeding ==
Map showing the league for each national team. League A League B League C League D Team suspended from competition

54 of 55 national teams within UEFA confederation participated the competition. Russia, slated to participate in League C, were suspended due to Russian invasion of Ukraine. The teams which finished bottom of their group in Leagues A and B, as well as the losers from the relegation play-outs of League C, from the 2022–23 season moved down a league, while the group winners of Leagues B, C and D moved up. The remaining teams stayed in their respective leagues.

In an interview with the Polish website meczyki.pl, UEFA vice-president Zbigniew Boniek said that all ten teams from CONMEBOL, South America's football federation, could join the UEFA Nations League from the 2024–25 edition of the competition. The plans, which would act as a response to FIFA's biennial World Cup plans, were intended as part of enhanced cooperation between the two organisations following the signing of a memorandum of understanding and the opening of a joint office in London. However, such an expansion was not possible after CONMEBOL submitted a request to FIFA to maintain the round-robin qualification format for the 2026 FIFA World Cup. On 25 January 2023, the UEFA Executive Committee confirmed the format for the 2024–25 UEFA Nations League, with no South American teams to be added.

In the 2022–23 access list, UEFA ranked teams based on the 2022–23 UEFA Nations League overall ranking, with slight modifications: teams that were relegated in the previous season were ranked immediately below those who were promoted, and rankings shifted with the removal of Russia. The seeding pots for the league phase were based on the access list ranking. The seeding pots, draw procedure, and fixture list procedures were confirmed by the UEFA Executive Committee during their meeting in Hamburg, Germany, on 2 December 2023.

Key
▲	Promoted after previous season
▼	Relegated after previous season
*	Participated in relegation play-outs

League A
Pot	Team	Prv	Rank
1	Spain (title holders)		1
1	Croatia		2
1	Italy		3
1	Netherlands		4
2	Denmark		5
2	Portugal		6
2	Belgium		7
2	Hungary		8
3	Switzerland		9
3	Germany		10
3	Poland		11
3	France		12
4	Israel	▲	13
4	Bosnia and Herzegovina	▲	14
4	Serbia	▲	15
4	Scotland	▲	16

League C
Pot	Team	Prv	Rank
1	Romania	▼	33
1	Sweden	▼	34
1	Armenia	▼	35
1	Luxembourg		36
2	Azerbaijan		37
2	Kosovo		38
2	Bulgaria		39
2	Faroe Islands		40
3	North Macedonia		41
3	Slovakia		42
3	Northern Ireland		43
3	Cyprus		44
4	Belarus		45
4	Lithuania (Note: The identity of the winners and losers of the League C relegation play-outs (involving Gibraltar and Lithuania) was unknown at the time of the draw.)	*	46
4	Estonia	▲	47
4	Latvia	▲	48

League B
Pot	Team	Prv	Rank
1	Austria	▼	17
1	Czech Republic	▼	18
1	England	▼	19
1	Wales	▼	20
2	Finland		21
2	Ukraine		22
2	Iceland		23
2	Norway		24
3	Slovenia		25
3	Republic of Ireland		26
3	Albania		27
3	Montenegro		28
4	Georgia	▲	29
4	Greece	▲	30
4	Turkey	▲	31
4	Kazakhstan	▲	32

League D
Pot	Team	Prv	Rank
1	Gibraltar	▼*	49
1	Moldova		50
2	Malta		51
2	Andorra		52
2	San Marino		53
2	Liechtenstein		54

Suspended from entering competition
Team
Russia

The draw for the league phase took place at the Maison de la Mutualité in Paris, France, on 8 February 2024, 18:00 CET. The draw, originally planned to take place in Madrid, was relocated due to the Luis Rubiales scandal.

For political reasons, Armenia and Azerbaijan (due to the Nagorno-Karabakh conflict) could not be drawn into the same group. Due to excessive travel restrictions, only one of England, Iceland, the Republic of Ireland or Wales could be drawn with Kazakhstan. No winter venue restrictions were necessary for countries with a risk of severe winter weather, and several other potential political and excessive travel restrictions were not required because the teams concerned were either in different leagues or the same draw pot.

== League A ==
=== Group A1 ===
Pos	Team	Pld	W	D	L	GF	GA	GD	Pts	Qualification or relegation	(Portugal)	(Croatia)	(Scotland)	(Poland)
1	Portugal	6	4	2	0	13	5	+8	14	Advance to quarter-finals	—	2–1	2–1	5–1
2	Croatia	6	2	2	2	8	8	0	8	Advance to quarter-finals	1–1	—	2–1	1–0
3	Scotland (R)	6	2	1	3	7	8	−1	7	Qualification for relegation play-offs	0–0	1–0	—	2–3
4	Poland (R)	6	1	1	4	9	16	−7	4	Relegation to League B	1–3	3–3	1–2	—

Source: UEFA
(R) Relegated

=== Group A2 ===
Pos	Team	Pld	W	D	L	GF	GA	GD	Pts	Qualification or relegation	(France)	(Italy)	(Belgium)	(Israel)
1	France	6	4	1	1	12	6	+6	13 (Note: Tied on head to head results. Overall goal difference: France +6, Italy +5.)	Advance to quarter-finals	—	1–3	2–0	0–0
2	Italy	6	4	1	1	13	8	+5	13	Advance to quarter-finals	1–3	—	2–2	4–1
3	Belgium (O)	6	1	1	4	6	9	−3	4 (Note: Tied on head to head points. Head to head goal difference: Belgium +1, Israel –1.)	Qualification for relegation play-offs	1–2	0–1	—	3–1
4	Israel (R)	6	1	1	4	5	13	−8	4	Relegation to League B	1–4	1–2	1–0	—

Source: UEFA
(O) Play-off winners; (R) Relegated

=== Group A3 ===
Pos	Team	Pld	W	D	L	GF	GA	GD	Pts	Qualification or relegation	(Germany)	(Netherlands)	(Hungary)	(Bosnia and Herzegovina)
1	Germany	6	4	2	0	18	4	+14	14	Advance to quarter-finals	—	1–0	5–0	7–0
2	Netherlands	6	2	3	1	13	7	+6	9	Advance to quarter-finals	2–2	—	4–0	5–2
3	Hungary (R)	6	1	3	2	4	11	−7	6	Qualification for relegation play-offs	1–1	1–1	—	0–0
4	Bosnia and Herzegovina (R)	6	0	2	4	4	17	−13	2	Relegation to League B	1–2	1–1	0–2	—

Source: UEFA
Rules for classification: Tiebreakers
(R) Relegated

=== Group A4 ===
Pos	Team	Pld	W	D	L	GF	GA	GD	Pts	Qualification or relegation	(Spain)	(Denmark)	(Serbia)	(Switzerland)
1	Spain	6	5	1	0	13	4	+9	16	Advance to quarter-finals	—	1–0	3–0	3–2
2	Denmark	6	2	2	2	7	5	+2	8	Advance to quarter-finals	1–2	—	2–0	2–0
3	Serbia (O)	6	1	3	2	3	6	−3	6	Qualification for relegation play-offs	0–0	0–0	—	2–0
4	Switzerland (R)	6	0	2	4	6	14	−8	2	Relegation to League B	1–4	2–2	1–1	—

Source: UEFA
(O) Play-off winners; (R) Relegated

=== Knockout stage ===
==== Bracket ====
Quarter-finals
Italy	1	3	4
Germany	2	3	5
Denmark	1	2	3
Portugal (a.e.t.)	0	5	5
Netherlands	2	3	5 (4)
Spain (p)	2	3	5 (5)
Croatia	2	0	2 (4)
France (p)	0	2	2 (5)

Semi-finals
4 June – Munich
Germany	1
Portugal	2
5 June – Stuttgart
Spain	5
France	4

Final
8 June – Munich
Portugal (p)	2 (5)
Spain	2 (3)
Third place play-off
8 June – Stuttgart
Germany	0
France	2

==== Quarter-finals ====
The draw for the quarter-finals was held on 22 November 2024, 12:00 CET, at the UEFA headquarters in Nyon, Switzerland, along with the draw for the semi-finals and promotion/relegation play-offs. In the draw, teams from the same group could not be drawn against each other. The first legs were played on 20 March, and the second legs were played on 23 March 2025.

Team 1	Agg.	Team 2	1st leg	2nd leg
Netherlands	5–5 (4–5 p)	Spain	2–2	3–3 (a.e.t.)
Croatia	2–2 (4–5 p)	France	2–0	0–2 (a.e.t.)
Denmark	3–5	Portugal	1–0	2–5 (a.e.t.)
Italy	4–5	Germany	1–2	3–3

==== Nations League Finals ====
UEFA appointed the winner of the quarter-final tie between Italy and Germany, which Germany ultimately won, as the host for the final tournament. The semi-finals pairings were determined by means of an open draw on 22 November 2024, 12:00 CET, at the UEFA headquarters in Nyon, Switzerland, along with the draw for the League A quarter-finals and promotion/relegation play-offs. For scheduling purposes, the host team was allocated to semi-final 1 as the administrative home team.

Times are CEST (UTC+2), as listed by UEFA.

===== Semi-finals =====
4 June 2025
21:10 (Note: The Germany v Portugal match, originally scheduled for 21:00, was delayed by ten minutes due to adverse weather conditions impacting the teams' warm-ups.)

Germany	1–2	Portugal
Wirtz 48'	Report	Conceição 63'; Ronaldo 68'

Allianz Arena, Munich
Attendance: 65,823
Referee: Slavko Vinčić (Slovenia)

5 June 2025
21:00

Spain	5–4	France
Williams 22'; Merino 25'; Yamal 54' (pen.), 67'; Pedri 55'	Report	Mbappé 59' (pen.); Cherki 79'; Vivian 84' (o.g.); Kolo Muani 90+3'

MHPArena, Stuttgart
Attendance: 51,724
Referee: Michael Oliver (England)

===== Third place play-off =====
8 June 2025
15:00

Germany	0–2	France
	Report	Mbappé 45'; Olise 84'

MHPArena, Stuttgart
Attendance: 51,313
Referee: Ivan Kružliak (Slovakia)

===== Final =====
8 June 2025
21:00

Portugal	2–2 (a.e.t.)	Spain
Mendes 26'; Ronaldo 61'	Report	Zubimendi 21'; Oyarzabal 45'
Penalties
Ramos (penalty scored); Vitinha (penalty scored); Fernandes (penalty scored); Mendes (penalty scored); R. Neves (penalty scored)	5–3	(penalty scored) Merino; (penalty scored) Baena; (penalty scored) Isco; (penalty missed) Morata

Munich Football Arena , Munich
Attendance: 65,852
Referee: Sandro Schärer (Switzerland)

=== Top goalscorers ===
There were 190 goals scored in 60 matches, for an average of 3.17 goals per match.

League A top goalscorers
Rank	Player	Goals
1	(Portugal national football team) Cristiano Ronaldo	8
2	(France national football team) Randal Kolo Muani	4
2	(Germany national football team) Tim Kleindienst	4
2	(Germany national football team) Florian Wirtz	4
2	(Spain national football team) Mikel Oyarzabal	4
6	10 players	3

== League B ==
=== Group B1 ===
Pos	Team	Pld	W	D	L	GF	GA	GD	Pts	Promotion, qualification or relegation	(Czech Republic)	(Ukraine)	(Georgia (country))	(Albania)
1	Czech Republic (P)	6	3	2	1	9	8	+1	11	Promotion to League A	—	3–2	2–1	2–0
2	Ukraine	6	2	2	2	8	8	0	8	Qualification for promotion play-offs	1–1	—	1–0	1–2
3	Georgia (O)	6	2	1	3	7	6	+1	7 (Note: Tied on head-to-head results. Overall goal difference: Georgia +1, Albania –2.)	Qualification for relegation play-offs	4–1	1–1	—	0–1
4	Albania (R)	6	2	1	3	4	6	−2	7	Relegation to League C	0–0	1–2	0–1	—

Source: UEFA
(O) Play-off winners; (P) Promoted; (R) Relegated

=== Group B2 ===
Pos	Team	Pld	W	D	L	GF	GA	GD	Pts	Promotion, qualification or relegation	(England)	(Greece)	(Republic of Ireland)	(Finland)
1	England (P)	6	5	0	1	16	3	+13	15 (Note: Tied on head to head points. Head-to-head goal difference: England +2, Greece −2.)	Promotion to League A	—	1–2	5–0	2–0
2	Greece (O, P)	6	5	0	1	11	4	+7	15	Qualification for promotion play-offs	0–3	—	2–0	3–0
3	Republic of Ireland (O)	6	2	0	4	3	12	−9	6	Qualification for relegation play-offs	0–2	0–2	—	1–0
4	Finland (R)	6	0	0	6	2	13	−11	0	Relegation to League C	1–3	0–2	1–2	—

Source: UEFA
(O) Play-off winners; (P) Promoted; (R) Relegated

=== Group B3 ===
Pos	Team	Pld	W	D	L	GF	GA	GD	Pts	Promotion, qualification or relegation	(Norway)	(Austria)	(Slovenia)	(Kazakhstan)
1	Norway (P)	6	4	1	1	15	7	+8	13	Promotion to League A	—	2–1	3–0	5–0
2	Austria	6	3	2	1	14	5	+9	11	Qualification for promotion play-offs	5–1	—	1–1	4–0
3	Slovenia (O)	6	2	2	2	7	9	−2	8	Qualification for relegation play-offs	1–4	1–1	—	3–0
4	Kazakhstan (R)	6	0	1	5	0	15	−15	1	Relegation to League C	0–0	0–2	0–1	—

Source: UEFA
(O) Play-off winners; (P) Promoted; (R) Relegated

=== Group B4 ===
Pos	Team	Pld	W	D	L	GF	GA	GD	Pts	Promotion, qualification or relegation	(Wales)	(Turkey)	(Iceland)	(Montenegro)
1	Wales (P)	6	3	3	0	9	4	+5	12	Promotion to League A	—	0–0	4–1	1–0
2	Turkey (O, P)	6	3	2	1	9	6	+3	11	Qualification for promotion play-offs	0–0	—	3–1	1–0
3	Iceland (R)	6	2	1	3	10	13	−3	7	Qualification for relegation play-offs	2–2	2–4	—	2–0
4	Montenegro (R)	6	1	0	5	4	9	−5	3	Relegation to League C	1–2	3–1	0–2	—

Source: UEFA
(O) Play-off winners; (P) Promoted; (R) Relegated

=== Top goalscorers ===
There were 128 goals scored in 48 matches, for an average of 2.67 goals per match.

League B top goalscorers
Rank	Player	Goals
1	(Norway national football team) Erling Haaland	7
2	(Slovenia national football team) Benjamin Šeško	5
3	(Turkey national football team) Kerem Aktürkoğlu	4
3	(Wales national football team) Harry Wilson	4
5	(Czech Republic national football team) Pavel Šulc	3
5	(England national football team) Harry Kane	3
5	(Georgia national football team) Georges Mikautadze	3
5	(Greece national football team) Fotis Ioannidis	3
5	(Iceland national football team) Orri Óskarsson	3
5	(Montenegro national football team) Nikola Krstović	3
5	(Norway national football team) Antonio Nusa	3
5	(Norway national football team) Alexander Sørloth	3

== League C ==
=== Group C1 ===
Pos	Team	Pld	W	D	L	GF	GA	GD	Pts	Promotion, qualification or relegation	(Sweden)	(Slovakia)	(Estonia)	(Azerbaijan)
1	Sweden (P)	6	5	1	0	19	4	+15	16	Promotion to League B	—	2–1	3–0	6–0
2	Slovakia	6	4	1	1	10	5	+5	13	Qualification for promotion play-offs	2–2	—	1–0	2–0
3	Estonia	6	1	1	4	3	9	−6	4		0–3	0–1	—	3–1
4	Azerbaijan (R)	6	0	1	5	3	17	−14	1	Relegation to League D	1–3	1–3	0–0	—

Source: UEFA
(P) Promoted; (R) Relegated

=== Group C2 ===
Pos	Team	Pld	W	D	L	GF	GA	GD	Pts	Promotion, qualification or relegation	(Romania)	(Kosovo)	(Cyprus)	(Lithuania)
1	Romania (P)	6	6	0	0	18	3	+15	18	Promotion to League B	—	3–0 (Note: The Romania v Kosovo match was suspended at 0–0 during second-half stoppage time, after the Kosovo team left the pitch, with the match abandoned thereafter. The match was subsequently awarded as a 3–0 win for Romania.)	4–1	3–1
2	Kosovo (O, P)	6	4	0	2	10	7	+3	12	Qualification for promotion play-offs	0–3	—	3–0	1–0
3	Cyprus	6	2	0	4	4	15	−11	6		0–3	0–4	—	2–1
4	Lithuania (R)	6	0	0	6	4	11	−7	0	Relegation to League D	1–2	1–2	0–1	—

Source: UEFA
(O) Play-off winners; (P) Promoted; (R) Relegated

=== Group C3 ===
Pos	Team	Pld	W	D	L	GF	GA	GD	Pts	Promotion, qualification or relegation	(Northern Ireland)	(Bulgaria)	(Belarus)	(Luxembourg)
1	Northern Ireland (P)	6	3	2	1	11	3	+8	11	Promotion to League B	—	5–0	2–0	2–0
2	Bulgaria	6	2	3	1	3	6	−3	9	Qualification for promotion play-offs	1–0	—	1–1	0–0
3	Belarus	6	1	4	1	3	4	−1	7		0–0	0–0	—	1–1
4	Luxembourg (O)	6	0	3	3	3	7	−4	3	Qualification for relegation play-offs	2–2	0–1	0–1	—

Source: UEFA
(O) Play-off winners; (P) Promoted

=== Group C4 ===
Pos	Team	Pld	W	D	L	GF	GA	GD	Pts	Promotion, qualification or relegation	(North Macedonia)	(Armenia)	(Faroe Islands)	(Latvia)
1	North Macedonia (P)	6	5	1	0	10	1	+9	16	Promotion to League B	—	2–0	1–0	1–0
2	Armenia	6	2	1	3	8	9	−1	7	Qualification for promotion play-offs	0–2	—	0–1	4–1
3	Faroe Islands	6	1	3	2	5	6	−1	6		1–1	2–2	—	1–1
4	Latvia (O)	6	1	1	4	4	11	−7	4	Qualification for relegation play-offs	0–3	1–2	1–0	—

Source: UEFA
(O) Play-off winners; (P) Promoted

=== Ranking of fourth-placed teams ===
Pos	Grp	Team	Pld	W	D	L	GF	GA	GD	Pts	Qualification or relegation
1	C4	Latvia	6	1	1	4	4	11	−7	4	Qualification for relegation play-offs
2	C3	Luxembourg	6	0	3	3	3	7	−4	3	Qualification for relegation play-offs
3	C1	Azerbaijan (R)	6	0	1	5	3	17	−14	1	Relegation to League D
4	C2	Lithuania (R)	6	0	0	6	4	11	−7	0	Relegation to League D

Source: UEFA
(R) Relegated

=== Top goalscorers ===
There were 115 goals scored in 48 matches, for an average of 2.4 goals per match.

League C top goalscorers
Rank	Player	Goals
1	(Sweden men's national football team) Viktor Gyökeres	9
2	(Romania national football team) Răzvan Marin	6
3	(Northern Ireland national football team) Isaac Price	4
3	(Slovakia national football team) David Strelec	4
3	(Sweden men's national football team) Alexander Isak	4
6	(North Macedonia national football team) Bojan Miovski	3
7	15 players	2

== League D ==
=== Group D1 ===
Pos	Team	Pld	W	D	L	GF	GA	GD	Pts	Promotion or qualification	(San Marino)	(Gibraltar)	(Liechtenstein)
1	San Marino (P)	4	2	1	1	5	3	+2	7	Promotion to League C	—	1–1	1–0
2	Gibraltar	4	1	3	0	4	3	+1	6	Qualification for promotion play-offs	1–0	—	2–2
3	Liechtenstein	4	0	2	2	3	6	−3	2		1–3	0–0	—

Source: UEFA
(P) Promoted

=== Group D2 ===
Pos	Team	Pld	W	D	L	GF	GA	GD	Pts	Promotion or qualification	(Moldova)	(Malta)	(Andorra)
1	Moldova (P)	4	3	0	1	5	1	+4	9	Promotion to League C	—	2–0	2–0
2	Malta	4	2	1	1	2	2	0	7	Qualification for promotion play-offs	1–0	—	0–0
3	Andorra	4	0	1	3	0	4	−4	1		0–1	0–1	—

Source: UEFA
(P) Promoted

=== Top goalscorers ===
There were 19 goals scored in 12 matches, for an average of 1.58 goals per match.

League D top goalscorers
Rank	Player	Goals
1	(Gibraltar national football team) Liam Walker	2
1	(San Marino national football team) Nicola Nanni	2
3	(Gibraltar national football team) Ethan Britto	1
3	(Gibraltar national football team) James Scanlon	1
3	(Liechtenstein national football team) Nicolas Hasler	1
3	(Liechtenstein national football team) Ferhat Saglam	1
3	(Liechtenstein national football team) Aron Sele	1
3	(Malta national football team) Ryan Camenzuli	1
3	(Malta national football team) Teddy Teuma	1
3	(Moldova national football team) Mihail Caimacov	1
3	(Moldova national football team) Maxim Cojocaru	1
3	(Moldova national football team) Artur Ioniță	1
3	(Moldova national football team) Ion Nicolaescu	1
3	(Moldova national football team) Virgiliu Postolachi	1
3	(San Marino national football team) Alessandro Golinucci	1
3	(San Marino national football team) Lorenzo Lazzari	1
3	(San Marino national football team) Nicko Sensoli	1

== Promotion/relegation play-offs ==
The draw for the promotion/relegation play-offs was held on 22 November 2024, 12:00 CET, at the UEFA headquarters in Nyon, Switzerland, along with the draw for the League A quarter-finals and semi-finals. The League A/B and B/C play-off matches were scheduled for 20 and 23 March 2025. To ensure enough teams were available for the March 2025 window of World Cup qualifying, the League C/D play-off matches are scheduled for 26 and 31 March 2026. Had any team participating in the League C/D play-offs qualified for the World Cup qualifying play-offs, then the League C/D play-offs would have been cancelled with the teams remaining in their respective leagues.

=== League A vs League B ===
Team 1	Agg.	Team 2	1st leg	2nd leg
Turkey	6–1	Hungary	3–1	3–0
Ukraine	3–4	Belgium	3–1	0–3
Austria	1–3	Serbia	1–1	0–2
Greece	3–1	Scotland	0–1	3–0

=== League B vs League C ===
Team 1	Agg.	Team 2	1st leg	2nd leg
Kosovo	5–2	Iceland	2–1	3–1
Bulgaria	2–4	Republic of Ireland	1–2	1–2
Armenia	1–9	Georgia	0–3	1–6
Slovakia	0–1	Slovenia	0–0	0–1 (a.e.t.)

=== League C vs League D ===
Team 1	Agg.	Team 2	1st leg	2nd leg
Gibraltar	0–2	Latvia	0–1	0–1
Malta	0–5	Luxembourg	0–2	0–3

=== Top goalscorers ===
There were 53 goals scored in 20 matches, for an average of 2.65 goals per match.

Promotion/relegation play-offs top goalscorers
Rank	Player	Goals
1	(Georgia national football team) Georges Mikautadze	4
2	(Belgium national football team) Romelu Lukaku	3
2	(Kosovo national football team) Vedat Muriqi	3
4	(Iceland national football team) Orri Óskarsson	2
4	(Luxembourg national football team) Vincent Thill	2
6	38 players	1

== Overall ranking ==
Starting from the 2024–25 season, the overall rankings were split into interim and final versions. While the interim overall rankings were based on league rankings, explicitly ordering teams from higher leagues over those from lower ones, the final overall rankings took into account the results of the League A knockout stage and promotion/relegation play-offs, updating the interim overall rankings accordingly.

=== Interim overall ranking ===
Following the conclusion of the league phase in November 2024, an interim overall ranking was established based on the results of each league.

League A
League B

Rnk	Team	Pld	Pts
1	Spain	6	16
2	Germany	6	14
3	Portugal	6	14
4	France	6	13
5	Italy	6	13
6	Netherlands	6	9
7	Denmark	6	8
8	Croatia	6	8
9	Scotland	6	7
10	Serbia	6	6
11	Hungary	6	6
12	Belgium	6	4
13	Poland	6	4
14	Israel	6	4
15	Switzerland	6	2
16	Bosnia and Herzegovina	6	2

Source: UEFA

Rnk	Team	Pld	Pts
17	England	6	15
18	Norway	6	13
19	Wales	6	12
20	Czech Republic	6	11
21	Greece	6	15
22	Austria	6	11
23	Turkey	6	11
24	Ukraine	6	8
25	Slovenia	6	8
26	Georgia	6	7
27	Iceland	6	7
28	Republic of Ireland	6	6
29	Albania	6	7
30	Montenegro	6	3
31	Kazakhstan	6	1
32	Finland	6	0

Source: UEFA
League C
League D

Rnk	Team	Pld	Pts
33	Romania	6	18
34	Sweden	6	16
35	North Macedonia	6	16
36	Northern Ireland	6	11
37	Slovakia	6	13
38	Kosovo	6	12
39	Bulgaria	6	9
40	Armenia	6	7
41	Belarus	6	7
42	Faroe Islands	6	6
43	Cyprus	6	6
44	Estonia	6	4
45	Latvia	6	4
46	Luxembourg	6	3
47	Azerbaijan	6	1
48	Lithuania	6	0

Source: UEFA

Rnk	Team	Pld	Pts
49	Moldova	4	9
50	San Marino	4	7
51	Malta	4	7
52	Gibraltar	4	6
53	Liechtenstein	4	2
54	Andorra	4	1

Source: UEFA

=== Final overall ranking ===
The final overall ranking, established at the conclusion of the competition, adjusted the interim overall ranking by taking into account the results of the League A knockout stage and promotion/relegation play-offs. Teams that were promoted at the end of the 2024–25 season were ranked above those who were relegated, with the final rankings reflecting the composition of leagues for the 2026–27 UEFA Nations League.

Key
▲	Promoted after the season
▼	Relegated after the season
*	Participated in promotion/relegation play-offs

2026–27 League A participants
2026–27 League B participants

Rnk	Team	P
1	Portugal	
2	Spain	
3	France	
4	Germany	
5	Italy	
6	Netherlands	
7	Denmark	
8	Croatia	
9	Serbia	*
10	Belgium	*
11	England	▲
12	Norway	▲
13	Wales	▲
14	Czech Republic	▲
15	Greece	▲*
16	Turkey	▲*

Source: UEFA
Rules for classification: Ranking criteria

Rnk	Team	P/R
17	Scotland	▼*
18	Hungary	▼*
19	Poland	▼
20	Israel	▼
21	Switzerland	▼
22	Bosnia and Herzegovina	▼
23	Austria	*
24	Ukraine	*
25	Slovenia	*
26	Georgia	*
27	Republic of Ireland	*
28	Romania	▲
29	Sweden	▲
30	North Macedonia	▲
31	Northern Ireland	▲
32	Kosovo	▲*

Source: UEFA
Rules for classification: Ranking criteria
2026–27 League C participants
2026–27 League D participants

Rnk	Team	P/R
33	Iceland	▼*
34	Albania	▼
35	Montenegro	▼
36	Kazakhstan	▼
37	Finland	▼
38	Slovakia	*
39	Bulgaria	*
40	Armenia	*
41	Belarus	
42	Faroe Islands	
43	Cyprus	
44	Estonia	
45	Latvia	*
46	Luxembourg	*
47	Moldova	▲
48	San Marino	▲

Source: UEFA
Rules for classification: Ranking criteria

Rnk	Team	R
49	Azerbaijan	▼
50	Lithuania	▼
51	Malta	*
52	Gibraltar	*
53	Liechtenstein	
54	Andorra	

Source: UEFA
Rules for classification: Ranking criteria

== 2026 World Cup qualification play-offs ==
Based on the interim overall ranking, the four best-ranked Nations League group winners that finished outside the top two of their World Cup qualifying group joined the twelve group runners-up in the World Cup qualification second round (play-offs). If fewer than four Nations League group winners had been selected, the remaining spot(s) would have been allocated to the best-ranked remaining team(s) in the Nations League interim overall ranking that finished outside the top two of their qualifying group.

UNL	Rank	Team	Qualifying group
**Nations League group winners**
A	1	Spain ^{&}	E
A	2	Germany ^{&}	A
A	3	Portugal ^{&}	F
A	4	France ^{&}	D
B	17	England ^{&}	K
B	18	Norway ^{&}	I
B	19	Wales ^{†}	J
B	20	Czech Republic ^{†}	L
C	33	Romania ^{‡}	H
C	34	Sweden ^{‡}	B
C	35	North Macedonia ^{‡}	J
C	36	Northern Ireland ^{‡}	A
D	49	Moldova	I
D	50	San Marino	H
**Nations League remaining teams**: A / 5 / Italy ^{†} / I; A / 6 / Netherlands ^{&} / G; A / 7 / Denmark ^{†} / C; A / 8 / Croatia ^{&} / L; A / 9 / Scotland ^{&} / C; A / 10 / Serbia / K; A / 11 / Hungary / F; A / 12 / Belgium ^{&} / J; A / 13 / Poland ^{†} / G; A / 14 / Israel / I; A / 15 / Switzerland ^{&} / B; A / 16 / Bosnia and Herzegovina ^{†} / H

Key

- & Team qualified directly for World Cup as qualifying group winner
- † Team advanced to the play-offs as qualifying group runner-up
- ‡ Team (in **bold**) advanced to the play-offs as one of the best four Nations League group winners outside top two of their qualifying group
