= 2026 FIFA World Cup qualification – UEFA second round =

The UEFA second round of the qualification tournament for the 2026 FIFA World Cup, also known as the UEFA play-offs or European play-offs, was contested by sixteen teams from the UEFA segment of qualifying. The play-offs determined the final four European teams that joined the twelve group winners at the World Cup in Canada, Mexico and the United States. The twelve runners-up from the UEFA first round groups participated in the play-offs, along with four teams based on the 2024–25 UEFA Nations League interim overall ranking. The teams were divided into four paths, each containing four teams, with each play-off path featuring two single-leg semi-finals and one single-leg final. The twelve matches took place on 26 and 31 March 2026.

Bosnia and Herzegovina, the Czech Republic, Sweden and Turkey qualified for the final tournament.

== Format ==
The play-off format was confirmed by the UEFA Executive Committee during their meeting in Nyon, Switzerland, on 28 June 2023. The play-offs participants depended, in part, on results from the 2024–25 UEFA Nations League, although to a lesser degree than play-offs of the UEFA Euro 2024 qualifying tournament.

The twelve runners-up from the first round (group stage) were joined by four Nations League group winners that finished outside the top two of their qualifying group, based on the 2024–25 UEFA Nations League interim overall ranking. The sixteen teams were split into four play-off paths, each containing four teams. Each play-off path featured two single-leg semi-finals on 26 March, and one single-leg final on 31 March 2026. In the semi-finals, the fixtures of each path were drawn after the first round concluded using four seeding pots, with the Pot 1 team hosting the Pot 4 team and the Pot 2 team hosting the Pot 3 team. The host of each path final was decided by a draw between the two semi-final pairings. The winner of the four path finals qualified for the 2026 FIFA World Cup in Canada, Mexico and the United States.

The play-offs were played in single-leg knockout matches. If scores were level at the end of normal time, 30 minutes of extra time were played, where each team was allowed to make a sixth substitution. If the scores remained tied, a penalty shoot-out was used to determine the winner.

== Qualified teams ==
Sixteen teams advanced to the play-offs. The participants were not decided solely on the results of the first round, with four of the spots allocated to group winners of the 2024–25 edition of the UEFA Nations League.

=== Second-placed teams (all twelve advance) ===
The twelve runners-up from the first round (group stage) advanced to the play-offs.

| Group | Runners-up |
|---|---|
| A | Slovakia |
| B | Kosovo |
| C | Denmark |
| D | Ukraine |
| E | Turkey |
| F | Republic of Ireland |
| G | Poland |
| H | Bosnia and Herzegovina |
| I | Italy |
| J | Wales |
| K | Albania |
| L | Czech Republic |

=== Nations League teams (four advance) ===
Based on the 2024–25 UEFA Nations League interim overall ranking, the four best-ranked Nations League group winners that finished outside the top two of their qualifying group advanced to the play-offs. If fewer than four Nations League group winners had been selected, the remaining spot(s) would have been allocated to the best-ranked remaining team(s) in the Nations League interim overall ranking that finished outside the top two of their qualifying group.

At the start of qualifying, the teams in the table below were potentially able to receive a play-off spot in the order given: (Note: The table lists teams down to the lowest-ranked team that could have potentially received a play-off spot (the team ranked 16th in League A) based on the distribution of teams to qualifying groups. Ultimately, the last spot only reached down to the lowest-ranked League C group winner.)

| UNL | Rank | Team | Qualifying group |
|---|---|---|---|
**Nations League group winners**
| A | 1 | Spain ^{&} | E |
| A | 2 | Germany ^{&} | A |
| A | 3 | Portugal ^{&} | F |
| A | 4 | France ^{&} | D |
| B | 17 | England ^{&} | K |
| B | 18 | Norway ^{&} | I |
| B | 19 | Wales ^{†} | J |
| B | 20 | Czech Republic ^{†} | L |
| C | 33 | Romania ^{‡} | H |
| C | 34 | Sweden ^{‡} | B |
| C | 35 | North Macedonia ^{‡} | J |
| C | 36 | Northern Ireland ^{‡} | A |
| D | 49 | Moldova | I |
| D | 50 | San Marino | H |
**Nations League remaining teams**: A / 5 / Italy ^{†} / I; A / 6 / Netherlands ^{&} / G; A / 7 / Denmark ^{†} / C; A / 8 / Croatia ^{&} / L; A / 9 / Scotland ^{&} / C; A / 10 / Serbia / K; A / 11 / Hungary / F; A / 12 / Belgium ^{&} / J; A / 13 / Poland ^{†} / G; A / 14 / Israel / I; A / 15 / Switzerland ^{&} / B; A / 16 / Bosnia and Herzegovina ^{†} / H

Key

- & Team qualified directly for World Cup as qualifying group winner
- † Team advanced to the play-offs as qualifying group runner-up
- ‡ Team (in **bold**) advanced to the play-offs as one of the best four Nations League group winners outside top two of their qualifying group

== Draw ==
The draw to determine the four play-off paths was held on 20 November 2025, 13:00 CET, at the FIFA headquarters in Zurich, Switzerland. The sixteen teams advancing from the first round were divided into four pots of four teams each. The twelve group runners-up were allocated to Pots 1 to 3 (seeded based on the FIFA Men's World Ranking of November 2025), while the four teams advancing via the Nations League were automatically placed into Pot 4.

The draw was presented by Melanie Winiger and conducted by Manolo Zubiria, the 2026 tournament's U.S. chief officer. Former players Marco Materazzi and Martin Dahlin acted as assistants in the draw.

=== Procedure ===
The play-off paths were structured as follows:

- Play-off Path A was formed by semi-finals 1 and 2, with the winners of both semi-finals advancing to final A.
- Play-off Path B was formed by semi-finals 3 and 4, with the winners of both semi-finals advancing to final B.
- Play-off Path C was formed by semi-finals 5 and 6, with the winners of both semi-finals advancing to final C.
- Play-off Path D was formed by semi-finals 7 and 8, with the winners of both semi-finals advancing to final D.

The draw for the semi-final started with Pot 1 and completed with Pot 4. Teams were drawn and assigned to the first available play-off semi-final in numerical order, as follows:

- The Pot 1 teams (seeded) were allocated to semi-finals 1, 3, 5 and 7 as the host team.
- The Pot 2 teams (seeded) were allocated to semi-finals 2, 4, 6 and 8 as the host team.
- The Pot 3 teams (unseeded) were allocated to semi-finals 2, 4, 6 and 8 as the away team.
- The Pot 4 teams (unseeded) were allocated to semi-finals 1, 3, 5 and 7 as the away team.

The draw for the final hosts took place immediately afterwards, with finals A, B, C and D each having one of their semi-finalists selected as the host team.

No restrictions applied in the draw, as none of the clashes that were prohibited by UEFA for political reasons could occur. (Note: The Kosovo–Bosnia and Herzegovina prohibited clash was not possible due to both teams being in the same pot. Armenia–Azerbaijan, Belarus–Ukraine, Gibraltar–Spain and Kosovo–Serbia were also prohibited match-ups, but among those teams only Ukraine and Kosovo advanced to the play-offs.)

=== Seeding ===
The seeding pots for the semi-final draw were as follows. The FIFA Men's World Rankings of 19 November 2025 are shown below in brackets, with the 2024–25 UEFA Nations League interim overall ranking appended for Pot 4 teams.

Semi-final seeding pots
| Seeded | | Unseeded | |
| Pot 1 | Pot 2 | Pot 3 | Pot 4 (UNL) |
|---|---|---|---|
| 1. Italy (12); 2. Denmark (21); 3. Turkey (25); 4. Ukraine (28) | 5. Poland (31); 6. Wales (32); 7. Czech Republic (44); 8. Slovakia (45) | 9. Republic of Ireland (59); 10. Albania (63); 11. Bosnia and Herzegovina (71); 12. Kosovo (80) | 13. Sweden (43; NL–34); 14. Romania (47; NL–33); 15. North Macedonia (65; NL–35); 16. Northern Ireland (69; NL–36) |

== Schedule ==
The semi-finals took place on 26 March and the finals took place on 31 March 2026. The kick-off times were confirmed on 20 November 2025 following the draw. The semi-final and potential final hosts were required to confirm their venues by 19 December 2025. As part of UEFA's scheduling, the losing semi-finalists of each path played a friendly match against each other on the day of the play-off finals.

Times are CET/CEST, (Note: CET (UTC+1) for the semi-finals (26 March), and CEST (UTC+2) for the finals (31 March 2026).) as listed by UEFA (local times, if different, are in parentheses).

== Path A ==
The winner of Path A, Bosnia and Herzegovina, entered Group B in the final tournament.

=== Bracket ===
Semi-finals
26 March 2026 – Cardiff
Wales | 1 (2)
Bosnia and Herzegovina (p) | 1 (4)
26 March 2026 – Bergamo
Italy | 2
Northern Ireland | 0

Final
31 March 2026 – Zenica
Bosnia and Herzegovina (p) | 1 (4)
Italy | 1 (1)

=== Summary ===
| Home team | Score | Away team |
|---|---|---|
Semi-finals
| Italy | 2–0 | Northern Ireland |
| Wales | 1–1 (a.e.t.) (2–4 p) | Bosnia and Herzegovina |
Final
| Bosnia and Herzegovina | 1–1 (a.e.t.) (4–1 p) | Italy |

=== Semi-finals ===
26 March 2026
20:45

| Italy | 2–0 | Northern Ireland |
|---|---|---|
| Tonali 56'; Kean 80' | Report (FIFA); Report (UEFA) |

Stadio Atleti Azzurri d'Italia, Bergamo
Attendance: 23,439
Referee: Danny Makkelie (Netherlands)

26 March 2026
20:45 (19:45 UTC+0)

| Wales | 1–1 (a.e.t.) | Bosnia and Herzegovina |
|---|---|---|
| D. James 51' | Report (FIFA); Report (UEFA) | Džeko 86' |
Penalties
| Wilson (penalty scored); Harris (penalty scored); Johnson (penalty missed); Williams (penalty missed) | 2–4 | (penalty missed) Demirović; (penalty scored) Tabaković; (penalty scored) Bašić; (penalty scored) Hadžiahmetović; (penalty scored) Alajbegović |

Cardiff City Stadium, Cardiff
Attendance: 32,487
Referee: István Kovács (Romania)

=== Final ===
31 March 2026
20:45

| Bosnia and Herzegovina | 1–1 (a.e.t.) | Italy |
|---|---|---|
| Tabaković 79' | Report (FIFA); Report (UEFA) | Kean 15' |
Penalties
| Tahirović (penalty scored); Tabaković (penalty scored); Alajbegović (penalty scored); Bajraktarević (penalty scored) | 4–1 | (penalty missed) Esposito; (penalty scored) Tonali; (penalty missed) Cristante |

Bilino Polje Stadium, Zenica
Attendance: 9,500
Referee: Clément Turpin (France)

== Path B ==
The winner of Path B, Sweden, entered Group F in the final tournament.

=== Bracket ===
Semi-finals
26 March 2026 – Valencia
Ukraine | 1
Sweden | 3
26 March 2026 – Warsaw
Poland | 2
Albania | 1

Final
31 March 2026 – Solna
Sweden | 3
Poland | 2

=== Summary ===
| Home team | Score | Away team |
|---|---|---|
Semi-finals
| Ukraine | 1–3 | Sweden |
| Poland | 2–1 | Albania |
Final
| Sweden | 3–2 | Poland |

=== Semi-finals ===
26 March 2026
20:45

| Ukraine | 1–3 | Sweden |
|---|---|---|
| Ponomarenko 90' | Report (FIFA); Report (UEFA) | Gyökeres 6', 51', 73' (pen.) |

Estadi Ciutat de València, Valencia (Spain) (Note: Due to the Russian invasion of Ukraine, Ukraine were required to play their home matches at neutral venues.)
Attendance: 18,846
Referee: João Pinheiro (Portugal)

26 March 2026
20:45

| Poland | 2–1 | Albania |
|---|---|---|
| Lewandowski 63'; Zieliński 73' | Report (FIFA); Report (UEFA) | Hoxha 42' |

Stadion Narodowy, Warsaw
Attendance: 56,412
Referee: Anthony Taylor (England)

=== Final ===
31 March 2026
20:45

| Sweden | 3–2 | Poland |
|---|---|---|
| Elanga 20'; Lagerbielke 44'; Gyökeres 88' | Report (FIFA); Report (UEFA) | Zalewski 33'; Świderski 55' |

Nationalarenan, Solna
Attendance: 49,627
Referee: Slavko Vinčić (Slovenia)

== Path C ==
The winner of Path C, Turkey, entered Group D in the final tournament.

=== Bracket ===
Semi-finals
26 March 2026 – Bratislava
Slovakia | 3
Kosovo | 4
26 March 2026 – Istanbul
Turkey | 1
Romania | 0

Final
31 March 2026 – Pristina
Kosovo | 0
Turkey | 1

=== Summary ===
| Home team | Score | Away team |
|---|---|---|
Semi-finals
| Turkey | 1–0 | Romania |
| Slovakia | 3–4 | Kosovo |
Final
| Kosovo | 0–1 | Turkey |

=== Semi-finals ===
26 March 2026
18:00 (20:00 UTC+3)

| Turkey | 1–0 | Romania |
|---|---|---|
| Kadıoğlu 53' | Report (FIFA); Report (UEFA) |

Beşiktaş Stadium, Istanbul
Attendance: 38,979
Referee: François Letexier (France)

26 March 2026
20:45

| Slovakia | 3–4 | Kosovo |
|---|---|---|
| Valjent 6'; Haraslín 45'; Strelec 90+4' | Report (FIFA); Report (UEFA) | Hodža 21'; Asllani 47'; Muslija 60'; Hajrizi 72' |

Tehelné pole, Bratislava
Attendance: 20,113
Referee: Espen Eskås (Norway)

=== Final ===
31 March 2026
20:45

| Kosovo | 0–1 | Turkey |
|---|---|---|
| | Report (FIFA); Report (UEFA) | Aktürkoğlu 53' |

Fadil Vokrri Stadium, Pristina
Attendance: 12,887
Referee: Michael Oliver (England)

== Path D ==
The winner of Path D, the Czech Republic, entered Group A in the final tournament.

=== Bracket ===
Semi-finals
26 March 2026 – Prague
Czech Republic (p) | 2 (4)
Republic of Ireland | 2 (3)
26 March 2026 – Copenhagen
Denmark | 4
North Macedonia | 0

Final
31 March 2026 – Prague
Czech Republic (p) | 2 (3)
Denmark | 2 (1)

=== Summary ===
| Home team | Score | Away team |
|---|---|---|
Semi-finals
| Denmark | 4–0 | North Macedonia |
| Czech Republic | 2–2 (a.e.t.) (4–3 p) | Republic of Ireland |
Final
| Czech Republic | 2–2 (a.e.t.) (3–1 p) | Denmark |

=== Semi-finals ===
26 March 2026
20:45

| Denmark | 4–0 | North Macedonia |
|---|---|---|
| Damsgaard 49'; Isaksen 58', 59'; Nørgaard 75' | Report (FIFA); Report (UEFA) |

Parken Stadium, Copenhagen
Attendance: 35,746
Referee: Felix Zwayer (Germany)

26 March 2026
20:45

| Czech Republic | 2–2 (a.e.t.) | Republic of Ireland |
|---|---|---|
| Schick 27' (pen.); Krejčí 86' | Report (FIFA); Report (UEFA) | Parrott 19' (pen.); Kovář 23' (o.g.) |
Penalties
| Krejčí (penalty scored); Souček (penalty scored); Chytil (penalty missed); Schick (penalty scored); Kliment (penalty scored) | 4–3 | (penalty scored) Parrott; (penalty scored) Idah; (penalty scored) Brady; (penalty missed) Azaz; (penalty missed) Browne |

Fortuna Arena, Prague
Attendance: 19,137
Referee: Glenn Nyberg (Sweden)

=== Final ===
31 March 2026
20:45

| Czech Republic | 2–2 (a.e.t.) | Denmark |
|---|---|---|
| Šulc 3'; Krejčí 100' | Report (FIFA); Report (UEFA) | Andersen 72'; Høgh 111' |
Penalties
| Chorý (penalty scored); Souček (penalty scored); Krejčí (penalty missed); Sadílek (penalty scored) | 3–1 | (penalty missed) Højlund; (penalty scored) Eriksen; (penalty missed) Dreyer; (penalty missed) Jensen |

Stadion Letná, Prague
Attendance: 18,215
Referee: Maurizio Mariani (Italy)

== Goalscorers ==
There were 39 goals scored in 12 matches, for an average of 3.25 goals per match.

4 goals

- (Sweden men's national football team) Viktor Gyökeres

2 goals

- (Czech Republic national football team) Ladislav Krejčí
- (Denmark national football team) Gustav Isaksen
- (Italy national football team) Moise Kean

1 goal

- (Albania national football team) Arbër Hoxha
- (Bosnia and Herzegovina national football team) Edin Džeko
- (Bosnia and Herzegovina national football team) Haris Tabaković
- (Czech Republic national football team) Patrik Schick
- (Czech Republic national football team) Pavel Šulc
- (Denmark national football team) Joachim Andersen
- (Denmark national football team) Mikkel Damsgaard
- (Denmark national football team) Kasper Høgh
- (Denmark national football team) Christian Nørgaard
- (Italy national football team) Sandro Tonali
- (Kosovo national football team) Fisnik Asllani
- (Kosovo national football team) Kreshnik Hajrizi
- (Kosovo national football team) Veldin Hodža
- (Kosovo national football team) Florent Muslija
- (Poland national football team) Robert Lewandowski
- (Poland national football team) Karol Świderski
- (Poland national football team) Nicola Zalewski
- (Poland national football team) Piotr Zieliński
- (Republic of Ireland national football team) Troy Parrott
- (Slovakia national football team) Lukáš Haraslín
- (Slovakia national football team) David Strelec
- (Slovakia national football team) Martin Valjent
- (Sweden men's national football team) Anthony Elanga
- (Sweden men's national football team) Gustaf Lagerbielke
- (Turkey national football team) Kerem Aktürkoğlu
- (Turkey national football team) Ferdi Kadıoğlu
- (Ukraine national football team) Matviy Ponomarenko
- (Wales national football team) Daniel James

1 own goal

- (Czech Republic national football team) Matěj Kovář (against Republic of Ireland)

== Discipline ==
A player was automatically suspended for the next match for the following offences:

- Receiving a red card (red card suspensions could be extended for serious offences)
- Receiving two yellow cards in two different qualifying group stage matches (yellow card suspensions were carried forward to the play-off semi-finals, but not the play-off finals, World Cup final tournament or any other future international matches)

Yellow cards received during the qualifying group stage expired prior to the UEFA play-offs, thus preventing suspensions in the play-off finals due to yellow cards received in the semi-finals. However, yellow card suspensions accumulated at the end of the qualifying group stage would still be carried forward to the play-off semi-finals.

The following suspensions were served during the second round qualifying matches:

| Team | Player | Offence(s) | Suspended for match(es) |
|---|---|---|---|
| Denmark | Joachim Andersen | (yellow card) vs Scotland (5 September 2025); (yellow card) vs Scotland (18 November 2025) | vs North Macedonia (26 March 2026) |
| Denmark | Rasmus Kristensen | (yellow card) (yellow-red card) vs Scotland (18 November 2025) | vs North Macedonia (26 March 2026) |
| North Macedonia | Tihomir Kostadinov | (yellow card) vs Belgium (10 October 2025); (yellow card) vs Wales (18 November 2025) | vs Denmark (26 March 2026) |
| Poland | Nicola Zalewski | (yellow card) vs Finland (10 June 2025); (yellow card) vs Malta (17 November 2025) | vs Albania (26 March 2026) |
| Republic of Ireland | Festy Ebosele | (yellow card) vs Portugal (11 October 2025); (yellow card) vs Hungary (16 November 2025) | vs Czech Republic (26 March 2026) |
| Republic of Ireland | Liam Scales | (yellow card) vs Portugal (13 November 2025); (yellow card) vs Hungary (16 November 2025) | vs Czech Republic (26 March 2026) |
| Romania | Denis Drăguș | (red card) vs Bosnia and Herzegovina (15 November 2025) | vs Turkey (26 March 2026) |
| Ukraine | Yukhym Konoplya | (yellow card) vs Iceland (10 October 2025); (yellow card) vs Iceland (16 November 2025) | vs Sweden (26 March 2026) |
| Ukraine | Ruslan Malinovskyi | (yellow card) vs Azerbaijan (13 October 2025); (yellow card) vs Iceland (16 November 2025) | vs Sweden (26 March 2026) |

== See also ==
- 2026 FIFA World Cup qualification (inter-confederation play-offs)
