= Estadi Ciutat de València =

Association football stadium in València, Spain

Ciutat de València
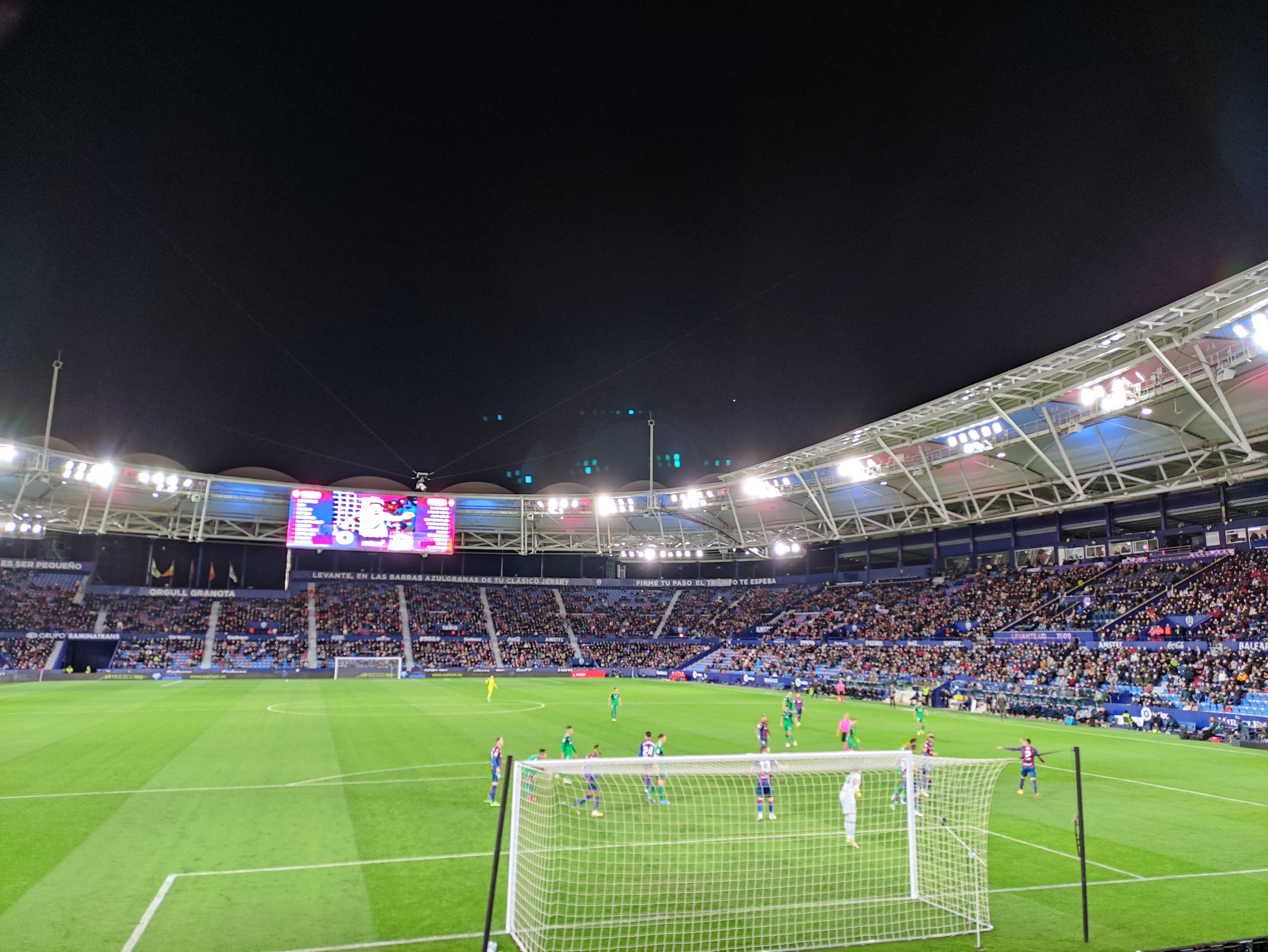
- The venue in 2021
- Interactive map of Ciutat de València
- Former names: Estadio Antonio Román (1969–1972); Nou Estadi del Llevant (1972–1999)
- Location: Valencia, Spain
- Coordinates: 39°29′41″N 0°21′51″W
- Owner: Levante UD
- Operator: Levante UD
- Capacity: 26,354
- Field size: 107 metres (117 yd) x 68 metres (74 yd)
- Public transit: Estadi del Llevant (Line 6)

Construction
- Opened: 1969
- Renovated: 2020

Tenants
- Levante UD (1969–present); Villarreal (2022); Spain national football team (selected matches)

Estadi Ciutat de València (Valencian: [esˈtaði siwˈtad de vaˈlensia]; Spanish: Estadio Ciudad de Valencia [esˈtaðjo θjuˈðað ðe βaˈlenθja]; English: City of Valencia Stadium) is a football stadium in Valencia and is the home ground of Levante UD. Built in 1969 and holding up to 26,354 spectators, it is the 23rd-largest stadium in Spain and the 4th-largest in the Valencian Community.

The stadium hosted an international friendly between Spain and Scotland on 4 September 2004. The game was abandoned with half an hour to play as lightning struck out the floodlights shortly after Raúl had made the score 1–1.

On 8 September 2014, the ground hosted Spain's first match of UEFA Euro 2016 qualification, a 5–1 victory over North Macedonia.

The stadium was renovated in 2020, with a new roof, video scoreboards and ambient lighting installed.

In late 2022, Villarreal CF temporarily played at the ground due to works at their Estadio de la Cerámica.

On 26 March 2026, Ukraine played a home World Cup qualification play-off against Sweden at the stadium, due to the war in Ukraine.
