= 2026 FIFA World Cup qualification (UEFA) =

Tournament details
- Dates: 21 March 2025 – 31 March 2026
- Teams: 54 (from 1 confederation)

Tournament statistics
- Matches played: 204
- Goals scored: 676 (3.31 per match)
- Attendance: 4,448,339 (21,806 per match)
- Top scorer: (Norway) Erling Haaland (16 goals)

The European section of the 2026 FIFA World Cup qualification competition acted as qualifiers for the 2026 FIFA World Cup, that was held in Canada, Mexico and the United States, for national teams that were members of the Union of European Football Associations (UEFA). A total of 16 slots in the final tournament were available for UEFA teams.

== Format ==
A revised qualification format was confirmed by the UEFA Executive Committee during their meeting in Nyon, Switzerland, on 25 January 2023. As the number of final tournament slots for UEFA had increased from 13 to 16, the qualification format was modified from the previous cycle. The qualifying group stage featured six groups of four and six groups of five teams. The winner of each group qualified for the World Cup, while the second-placed teams advanced to the play-offs, along with the four best-ranked group winners from the 2024–25 UEFA Nations League that finished outside the top two of their World Cup qualifying group. On 28 June 2023, the UEFA Executive Committee formally recommended the qualification format to FIFA, which was later approved.

- First round (group stage): Six groups of four and six groups of five teams played home-and-away matches against all other teams in the group. Group winners qualified for the World Cup.
- Second round (play-offs): Sixteen teams (twelve group runners-up and four best Nations League group winners, based on the Nations League overall ranking, which finished outside the top two of their qualifying group) were drawn into four paths, playing two rounds of single-match play-offs (semi-finals with the seeded teams to host, followed by finals, with the home teams to be drawn). The four path winners qualified for the World Cup.

== Schedule ==
Below was the schedule of the European qualifiers for the 2026 FIFA World Cup. Groups of five teams (Groups G–L) began in March 2025, while groups of four teams (Groups A–F) began in September 2025.

Round	Matchday		Dates
Round	Groups A–F	Groups G–L	Dates
First round (group stage)	—N/a	Matchday 1	21–22 March 2025
First round (group stage)	—N/a	Matchday 2	24–25 March 2025
First round (group stage)	—N/a	Matchday 3	6–7 June 2025
First round (group stage)	—N/a	Matchday 4	9–10 June 2025
First round (group stage)	Matchday 5		4–6 September 2025
First round (group stage)	Matchday 6		7–9 September 2025
First round (group stage)	Matchday 7		9–11 October 2025
First round (group stage)	Matchday 8		12–14 October 2025
First round (group stage)	Matchday 9		13–15 November 2025
First round (group stage)	Matchday 10		16–18 November 2025
Second round (play-offs)	Semi-finals		26 March 2026
Second round (play-offs)	Finals		31 March 2026

== Draw ==
The draw for the first round (group stage) was held on 13 December 2024, 12:00 CET, at the FIFA headquarters in Zurich, Switzerland. Of UEFA's 55 member associations, 54 men's national teams submitted a valid entry to the competition; Russia's entry was invalidated by their suspension from UEFA and FIFA competitions after their country's invasion of Ukraine.

The teams were seeded into five pots: Pots 1 to 4 each contained twelve teams, and Pot 5 contained six teams. FIFA, in consultation with UEFA, announced the allocation of teams to the five pots following the completion of the league phase of the 2024–25 UEFA Nations League. The teams were drawn into twelve groups: six groups of four teams (Groups A–F) and six groups of five teams (Groups G–L).

Following changes to the UEFA qualifying format, the competition featured staggered start dates. Five-team groups began in March 2025, while four-team groups started in September 2025. As 24 teams would be competing in the 2024–25 UEFA Nations League in March 2025 (8 in the League A quarter-finals and 16 in the League A/B or B/C promotion/relegation play-offs), significant changes were made to the seeding and draw procedures to accommodate all teams within the schedule.

=== Seeding method ===
Five-team groups could only contain one team participating in Nations League matches in March 2025, allowing these teams to have two free matchdays in World Cup qualifying to be scheduled during March. The remaining four teams in their group played among themselves during this window. Additionally, as the four quarter-final winners would compete in the 2025 UEFA Nations League Finals in June, they could not begin World Cup qualifying until September and therefore had to be drawn into four-team groups.

Given these conditions, Pot 1 contained the eight Nations League quarter-finalists, regardless of their position in the FIFA Men's World Ranking of November 2024. The quarter-finalists were represented by placeholders in the draw, denoting the winners and losers of each quarter-final pairing. (Note: As there were only six four-team groups available for the eight quarter-finalists, and the identities of the 2025 UEFA Nations League Finals participants were not known at the time of the World Cup qualifying draw, the eight quarter-finalists were represented in Pot 1 as the winners or defeated teams of quarter-finals 1–4.) The four remaining teams in Pot 1 were the next best-ranked teams in the World Ranking that November. The remaining teams were allocated to Pots 2 to 5 based on the World Ranking. This seeding method differed from previous cycles, as all World Cup qualifying group draws since 2010 had been seeded based solely on the World Ranking.

While ultimately not required, adjustments to Pots 2 to 5 could have been necessary depending on the distribution of teams competing in the Nations League promotion/relegation play-offs in March 2025. Specifically, if any draw pot contained more Nations League play-off teams than could be accommodated in the available qualifying groups, the lowest-ranked Nations League play-off team from that pot would have been swapped with the highest-ranked eligible team from the lower pot. This process would have been repeated as needed within the same pot or across different pots.

=== Draw procedure ===
The draw started with Pot 1 and completed with Pot 5. A team was drawn and assigned to the first available group (based on draw conditions) in alphabetical order. Each five-team group contained one team from each of the five pots, while each four-team group contained one team from each of the first four pots.

The following restrictions were applied with computer assistance:

- Competition-related reasons: To allow for the parallel scheduling of World Cup qualifying and Nations League matches in March and June 2025, the following restrictions applied for allocating teams to groups of four or five:
  - Pot 1: The four teams participating in the 2025 UEFA Nations League Finals (identified as the winners of quarter-finals 1–4) were guaranteed to be drawn into four-team groups (Groups A–F). All other teams from this pot could be drawn into any group.
  - Pots 2, 3 and 4: Nations League promotion/relegation play-off teams from these pots could be drawn into any-sized group, but could only join five-team groups (Groups G–L) that did not already contain a losing quarter-finalist or play-off participant. All other teams from these pots could be drawn into any group.
- Prohibited clashes: For political reasons, matches between the following pairs of teams were considered prohibited clashes and could not be drawn into the same group: Belarus–Ukraine, Gibraltar–Spain, (Note: The Gibraltar–Spain draw condition only applied to the placeholder for the loser of quarter-final 1, featuring the Netherlands and Spain. This was because the winner was placed in a four-team group, while Gibraltar, as a Pot 5 team, was placed in a five-team group.) Kosovo–Bosnia and Herzegovina, Kosovo–Serbia. (Additionally, Armenia–Azerbaijan was identified as a prohibited clash, but the teams were in the same pot for the draw.)
- Winter venues: A maximum of two teams whose venues were identified as having high or medium risk of severe winter conditions could be placed in each group: Estonia, Faroe Islands, Finland, Iceland, Latvia, Lithuania, Norway. (Note: Belarus and Ukraine, which typically have a winter venue draw restriction, did not have it applied given they were required to play at neutral venues.)
  - The two "hard winter venues" (Faroe Islands and Iceland) generally could not host matches in March or November, thus could not be drawn together, whilst the others had to play as few home matches as possible in March and November.
- Excessive travel: A maximum of one pair of teams identified with excessive travel distance in relation to other countries could be placed in each group: (Note: Excessive travel pairings involving France, Spain and Portugal applied to the placeholders for both the winner and loser of their respective quarter-final pairing.)
  - Azerbaijan: with Gibraltar, Iceland, Portugal.
  - Iceland: with Armenia, Cyprus. (Note: Israel, which typically had an excessive travel restriction with Iceland, were removed given they were required to play at neutral venues.)
  - Kazakhstan: with Andorra, England, France, Gibraltar, Iceland, Malta, Northern Ireland, Portugal, Republic of Ireland, Scotland, Spain, Wales.

=== Seeding pots ===
The draw pots were announced on 28 November 2024, based on the FIFA Men's World Ranking released on the same day.

Pot 1
QF	Team (Note: Note: Bold indicates the team qualified for the World Cup. Italics indicates the team advanced to the second round.)	Rank
1	**Spain**	3
1	**Netherlands**	7
2	**France**	2
2	**Croatia**	13
3	**Portugal**	6
3	Denmark	21
4	Italy	9
4	**Germany**	10
—N/a	**England**	4
—N/a	**Belgium**	8
—N/a	**Switzerland**	20
—N/a	**Austria**	22

Pot 4
Team	Rank
Bulgaria	82
Luxembourg	92
Belarus	98
Kosovo	99
Armenia	100
Kazakhstan	110
Azerbaijan	117
Estonia	123
Cyprus	130
Faroe Islands	137
Latvia	140
Lithuania	142

Pot 2
Team	Rank
Ukraine	25
Sweden	27
Turkey	28
Wales	29
Hungary	30
Serbia	32
Poland	35
Romania	38
Greece	39
Slovakia	41
Czech Republic	42
**Norway**	43

Pot 5
Team	Rank
Moldova	151
Malta	169
Andorra	171
Gibraltar	197
Liechtenstein	204
San Marino	210

Pot 3
Team	Rank
**Scotland**	45
Slovenia	55
Republic of Ireland	60
Albania	65
North Macedonia	67
Georgia	68
Finland	69
Iceland	70
Northern Ireland	71
Montenegro	73
Bosnia and Herzegovina	74
Israel	76

Banned from entering qualifying
Team	Rank
Russia	34

Key

1. ^{QF} Nations League quarter-finalist, automatically seeded into Pot 1 and unavailable during the March 2025 window
2. ^{PO} Nations League promotion/relegation play-offs participant that was unavailable during the March 2025 window

== Summary ==
Group winners qualified directly for 2026 FIFA World Cup
Group runners-up and best four Nations League group winners advanced to second round (play-offs)
Other teams were eliminated after the first round (group stage)

Group A	Group B	Group C	Group D	Group E	Group F	Group G	Group H	Group I	Group J	Group K	Group L
Germany	Switzerland	Scotland	France	Spain	Portugal	Netherlands	Austria	Norway	Belgium	England	Croatia
Slovakia	Kosovo	Denmark	Ukraine	Turkey	Republic of Ireland	Poland	Bosnia and Herzegovina	Italy	Wales	Albania	Czech Republic
Northern Ireland	Slovenia	Greece	Iceland	Georgia	Hungary	Finland	Romania	Israel	North Macedonia	Serbia	Faroe Islands
Luxembourg	Sweden	Belarus	Azerbaijan	Bulgaria	Armenia	Malta	Cyprus	Estonia	Kazakhstan	Latvia	Montenegro
						Lithuania	San Marino	Moldova	Liechtenstein	Andorra	Gibraltar

== First round ==
The group stage fixture list was confirmed by UEFA on 13 December 2024 following the draw.

=== Group A ===
Pos	Team	Pld	W	D	L	GF	GA	GD	Pts	Qualification	(Germany national football team)	(Slovakia national football team)	(Northern Ireland national football team)	(Luxembourg national football team)
1	Germany	6	5	0	1	16	3	+13	15	Qualification for 2026 FIFA World Cup	—	6–0	3–1	4–0
2	Slovakia	6	4	0	2	6	8	−2	12	Advance to play-offs	2–0	—	1–0	2–0
3	Northern Ireland	6	3	0	3	7	6	+1	9	Advance to play-offs via Nations League	0–1	2–0	—	1–0
4	Luxembourg	6	0	0	6	1	13	−12	0		0–2	0–1	1–3	—

Source: FIFA, UEFA
Rules for classification: Tiebreakers

=== Group B ===
Pos	Team	Pld	W	D	L	GF	GA	GD	Pts	Qualification	(Switzerland national football team)	(Kosovo national football team)	(Slovenia national football team)	(Sweden men's national football team)
1	Switzerland	6	4	2	0	14	2	+12	14	Qualification for 2026 FIFA World Cup	—	4–0	3–0	4–1
2	Kosovo	6	3	2	1	6	5	+1	11	Advance to play-offs	1–1	—	0–0	2–0
3	Slovenia	6	0	4	2	3	8	−5	4		0–0	0–2	—	2–2
4	Sweden	6	0	2	4	4	12	−8	2	Advance to play-offs via Nations League	0–2	0–1	1–1	—

Source: FIFA, UEFA
Rules for classification: Tiebreakers

=== Group C ===
Pos	Team	Pld	W	D	L	GF	GA	GD	Pts	Qualification	(Scotland national football team)	(Denmark national football team)	(Greece national football team)	(Belarus national football team)
1	Scotland	6	4	1	1	13	7	+6	13	Qualification for 2026 FIFA World Cup	—	4–2	3–1	2–1
2	Denmark	6	3	2	1	16	7	+9	11	Advance to play-offs	0–0	—	3–1	2–2
3	Greece	6	2	1	3	10	12	−2	7		3–2	0–3	—	5–1
4	Belarus	6	0	2	4	4	17	−13	2		0–2	0–6	0–0	—

Source: FIFA, UEFA
Rules for classification: Tiebreakers

=== Group D ===
Pos	Team	Pld	W	D	L	GF	GA	GD	Pts	Qualification	(France national football team)	(Ukraine national football team)	(Iceland national football team)	(Azerbaijan national football team)
1	France	6	5	1	0	16	4	+12	16	Qualification for 2026 FIFA World Cup	—	4–0	2–1	3–0
2	Ukraine	6	3	1	2	10	11	−1	10	Advance to play-offs	0–2	—	2–0	2–1
3	Iceland	6	2	1	3	13	11	+2	7		2–2	3–5	—	5–0
4	Azerbaijan	6	0	1	5	3	16	−13	1		1–3	1–1	0–2	—

Source: FIFA, UEFA
Rules for classification: Tiebreakers

=== Group E ===
Pos	Team	Pld	W	D	L	GF	GA	GD	Pts	Qualification	(Spain national football team)	(Turkey national football team)	(Georgia national football team)	(Bulgaria national football team)
1	Spain	6	5	1	0	21	2	+19	16	Qualification for 2026 FIFA World Cup	—	2–2	2–0	4–0
2	Turkey	6	4	1	1	17	12	+5	13	Advance to play-offs	0–6	—	4–1	2–0
3	Georgia	6	1	0	5	7	15	−8	3		0–4	2–3	—	3–0
4	Bulgaria	6	1	0	5	3	19	−16	3		0–3	1–6	2–1	—

Source: FIFA, UEFA
Rules for classification: Tiebreakers

=== Group F ===
Pos	Team	Pld	W	D	L	GF	GA	GD	Pts	Qualification	(Portugal national football team)	(Republic of Ireland national football team)	(Hungary national football team)	(Armenia national football team)
1	Portugal	6	4	1	1	20	7	+13	13	Qualified for the 2026 FIFA World Cup	—	1–0	2–2	9–1
2	Republic of Ireland	6	3	1	2	9	7	+2	10	Advanced to play-offs	2–0	—	2–2	1–0
3	Hungary	6	2	2	2	11	10	+1	8		2–3	2–3	—	2–0
4	Armenia	6	1	0	5	3	19	−16	3		0–5	2–1	0–1	—

Source: FIFA, UEFA
Rules for classification: Tiebreakers

=== Group G ===
Pos	Team	Pld	W	D	L	GF	GA	GD	Pts	Qualification	(Netherlands national football team)	(Poland national football team)	(Finland national football team)	(Malta national football team)	(Lithuania national football team)
1	Netherlands	8	6	2	0	27	4	+23	20	Qualification for 2026 FIFA World Cup	—	1–1	4–0	8–0	4–0
2	Poland	8	5	2	1	14	7	+7	17	Advance to play-offs	1–1	—	3–1	2–0	1–0
3	Finland	8	3	1	4	8	14	−6	10		0–2	2–1	—	0–1	2–1
4	Malta	8	1	2	5	4	19	−15	5		0–4	2–3	0–1	—	0–0
5	Lithuania	8	0	3	5	6	15	−9	3		2–3	0–2	2–2	1–1	—

Source: FIFA, UEFA
Rules for classification: Tiebreakers

=== Group H ===
Pos	Team	Pld	W	D	L	GF	GA	GD	Pts	Qualification	(Austria national football team)	(Bosnia and Herzegovina national football team)	(Romania national football team)	(Cyprus national football team)	(San Marino national football team)
1	Austria	8	6	1	1	22	4	+18	19	Qualification for 2026 FIFA World Cup	—	1–1	2–1	1–0	10–0
2	Bosnia and Herzegovina	8	5	2	1	17	7	+10	17	Advance to play-offs	1–2	—	3–1	2–1	1–0
3	Romania	8	4	1	3	19	10	+9	13	Advance to play-offs via Nations League	1–0	0–1	—	2–0	7–1
4	Cyprus	8	2	2	4	11	11	0	8		0–2	2–2	2–2	—	2–0
5	San Marino	8	0	0	8	2	39	−37	0		0–4	0–6	1–5	0–4	—

Source: FIFA, UEFA
Rules for classification: Tiebreakers

=== Group I ===
Pos	Team	Pld	W	D	L	GF	GA	GD	Pts	Qualification	(Norway national football team)	(Italy national football team)	(Israel national football team)	(Estonia national football team)	(Moldova national football team)
1	Norway	8	8	0	0	37	5	+32	24	Qualification for 2026 FIFA World Cup	—	3–0	5–0	4–1	11–1
2	Italy	8	6	0	2	21	12	+9	18	Advance to play-offs	1–4	—	3–0	5–0	2–0
3	Israel	8	4	0	4	19	20	−1	12		2–4	4–5	—	2–1	4–1
4	Estonia	8	1	1	6	8	21	−13	4		0–1	1–3	1–3	—	1–1
5	Moldova	8	0	1	7	5	32	−27	1		0–5	0–2	0–4	2–3	—

Source: FIFA, UEFA
Rules for classification: Tiebreakers

=== Group J ===
Pos	Team	Pld	W	D	L	GF	GA	GD	Pts	Qualification	(Belgium national football team)	(Wales national football team)	(North Macedonia national football team)	(Kazakhstan national football team)	(Liechtenstein national football team)
1	Belgium	8	5	3	0	29	7	+22	18	Qualification for 2026 FIFA World Cup	—	4–3	0–0	6–0	7–0
2	Wales	8	5	1	2	21	11	+10	16	Advance to play-offs	2–4	—	7–1	3–1	3–0
3	North Macedonia	8	3	4	1	13	10	+3	13	Advance to play-offs via Nations League	1–1	1–1	—	1–1	5–0
4	Kazakhstan	8	2	2	4	9	13	−4	8		1–1	0–1	0–1	—	4–0
5	Liechtenstein	8	0	0	8	0	31	−31	0		0–6	0–1	0–3	0–2	—

Source: FIFA, UEFA
Rules for classification: Tiebreakers

=== Group K ===
Pos	Team	Pld	W	D	L	GF	GA	GD	Pts	Qualification	(England national football team)	(Albania national football team)	(Serbia national football team)	(Latvia national football team)	(Andorra national football team)
1	England	8	8	0	0	22	0	+22	24	Qualification for 2026 FIFA World Cup	—	2–0	2–0	3–0	2–0
2	Albania	8	4	2	2	7	5	+2	14	Advance to play-offs	0–2	—	0–0	1–0	3–0
3	Serbia	8	4	1	3	9	10	−1	13		0–5	0–1	—	2–1	3–0
4	Latvia	8	1	2	5	5	15	−10	5		0–5	1–1	0–1	—	2–2
5	Andorra	8	0	1	7	3	16	−13	1		0–1	0–1	1–3	0–1	—

Source: FIFA, UEFA
Rules for classification: Tiebreakers

=== Group L ===
Pos	Team	Pld	W	D	L	GF	GA	GD	Pts	Qualification	(Croatia national football team)	(Czech Republic national football team)	(Faroe Islands national football team)	(Montenegro national football team)	(Gibraltar national football team)
1	Croatia	8	7	1	0	26	4	+22	22	Qualification for 2026 FIFA World Cup	—	5–1	3–1	4–0	3–0
2	Czech Republic	8	5	1	2	18	8	+10	16	Advance to play-offs	0–0	—	2–1	2–0	6–0
3	Faroe Islands	8	4	0	4	11	9	+2	12		0–1	2–1	—	4–0	2–1
4	Montenegro	8	3	0	5	8	17	−9	9		2–3	0–2	1–0	—	3–1
5	Gibraltar	8	0	0	8	3	28	−25	0		0–7	0–4	0–1	1–2	—

Source: FIFA, UEFA
Rules for classification: Tiebreakers

== Second round ==
The second round (play-offs) was contested by the twelve group runners-up and the best four Nations League group winners, based on the Nations League interim overall ranking, who finished outside the top two of their qualifying group. The sixteen teams were split into four play-off paths, each containing four teams. Each path featured two single-leg semi-finals and one single-leg final. In the semi-finals, the fixtures of each path were determined by seeding pots, with the Pot 1 team hosting the Pot 4 team and the Pot 2 team hosting the Pot 3 team. The host of each path final was decided by a draw between the two semi-final pairings.

=== Nations League team selection ===
Based on the 2024–25 UEFA Nations League interim overall ranking, the four best-ranked Nations League group winners that finished outside the top two of their qualifying group advanced to the play-offs. If fewer than four Nations League group winners had been selected, the remaining spot(s) would have been allocated to the best-ranked remaining team(s) in the Nations League interim overall ranking that finished outside the top two of their qualifying group.

At the start of qualifying, the teams in the table below were potentially able to receive a play-off spot in the order given: (Note: The table lists teams down to the lowest-ranked team that could have potentially received a play-off spot (the team ranked 16th in League A) based on the distribution of teams to qualifying groups. Ultimately, the last spot only reached down to the lowest-ranked League C group winner.)

UNL	Rank	Team	Qualifying group
**Nations League group winners**
A	1	Spain ^{&}	E
A	2	Germany ^{&}	A
A	3	Portugal ^{&}	F
A	4	France ^{&}	D
B	17	England ^{&}	K
B	18	Norway ^{&}	I
B	19	Wales ^{†}	J
B	20	Czech Republic ^{†}	L
C	33	Romania ^{‡}	H
C	34	Sweden ^{‡}	B
C	35	North Macedonia ^{‡}	J
C	36	Northern Ireland ^{‡}	A
D	49	Moldova	I
D	50	San Marino	H
**Nations League remaining teams**: A / 5 / Italy ^{†} / I; A / 6 / Netherlands ^{&} / G; A / 7 / Denmark ^{†} / C; A / 8 / Croatia ^{&} / L; A / 9 / Scotland ^{&} / C; A / 10 / Serbia / K; A / 11 / Hungary / F; A / 12 / Belgium ^{&} / J; A / 13 / Poland ^{†} / G; A / 14 / Israel / I; A / 15 / Switzerland ^{&} / B; A / 16 / Bosnia and Herzegovina ^{†} / H

Key

- & Team qualified directly for World Cup as qualifying group winner
- † Team advanced to the play-offs as qualifying group runner-up
- ‡ Team (in **bold**) advanced to the play-offs as one of the best four Nations League group winners outside top two of their qualifying group

=== Draw ===
The draw to determine the four play-off paths was held on 20 November 2025, 13:00 CET, at the FIFA headquarters in Zurich, Switzerland. The sixteen teams advancing from the first round were divided into four pots of four teams each. The twelve group runners-up were allocated to Pots 1 to 3 (seeded based on the FIFA Men's World Ranking of November 2025), while the four teams advancing via the Nations League were automatically placed into Pot 4. The play-off paths were structured as follows:

- Play-off Path A was formed by semi-finals 1 and 2, with the winners of both semi-finals advancing to final A.
- Play-off Path B was formed by semi-finals 3 and 4, with the winners of both semi-finals advancing to final B.
- Play-off Path C was formed by semi-finals 5 and 6, with the winners of both semi-finals advancing to final C.
- Play-off Path D was formed by semi-finals 7 and 8, with the winners of both semi-finals advancing to final D.

The draw for the semi-final started with Pot 1 and completed with Pot 4. Teams were drawn and assigned to the first available play-off semi-final in numerical order, as follows:

- The Pot 1 teams (seeded) were allocated to semi-finals 1, 3, 5 and 7 as the host team.
- The Pot 2 teams (seeded) were allocated to semi-finals 2, 4, 6 and 8 as the host team.
- The Pot 3 teams (unseeded) were allocated to semi-finals 2, 4, 6 and 8 as the away team.
- The Pot 4 teams (unseeded) were allocated to semi-finals 1, 3, 5 and 7 as the away team.

The draw for the final hosts took place immediately afterwards, with finals A, B, C and D each having one of their semi-finalists selected as the host team.

No restrictions applied in the draw, as none of the clashes that were prohibited by UEFA for political reasons could occur. The seeding pots for the semi-final draw were as follows. The FIFA Men's World Rankings of 19 November 2025 are shown below in brackets, with the 2024–25 UEFA Nations League interim overall ranking appended for Pot 4 teams.

Semi-final seeding pots
Seeded		Unseeded	
Pot 1	Pot 2	Pot 3	Pot 4 (UNL)
1. Italy (12); 2. Denmark (21); 3. Turkey (25); 4. Ukraine (28)	5. Poland (31); 6. Wales (32); 7. Czech Republic (44); 8. Slovakia (45)	9. Republic of Ireland (59); 10. Albania (63); 11. Bosnia and Herzegovina (71); 12. Kosovo (80)	13. Sweden (43; NL–34); 14. Romania (47; NL–33); 15. North Macedonia (65; NL–35); 16. Northern Ireland (69; NL–36)

=== Path A ===
Home team	Score	Away team
Semi-finals
Italy	2–0	Northern Ireland
Wales	1–1 (a.e.t.) (2–4 p)	Bosnia and Herzegovina
Final
Bosnia and Herzegovina	1–1 (a.e.t.) (4–1 p)	Italy

=== Path B ===
Home team	Score	Away team
Semi-finals
Ukraine	1–3	Sweden
Poland	2–1	Albania
Final
Sweden	3–2	Poland

=== Path C ===
Home team	Score	Away team
Semi-finals
Turkey	1–0	Romania
Slovakia	3–4	Kosovo
Final
Kosovo	0–1	Turkey

=== Path D ===
Home team	Score	Away team
Semi-finals
Denmark	4–0	North Macedonia
Czech Republic	2–2 (a.e.t.) (4–3 p)	Republic of Ireland
Final
Czech Republic	2–2 (a.e.t.) (3–1 p)	Denmark

== Qualified teams ==
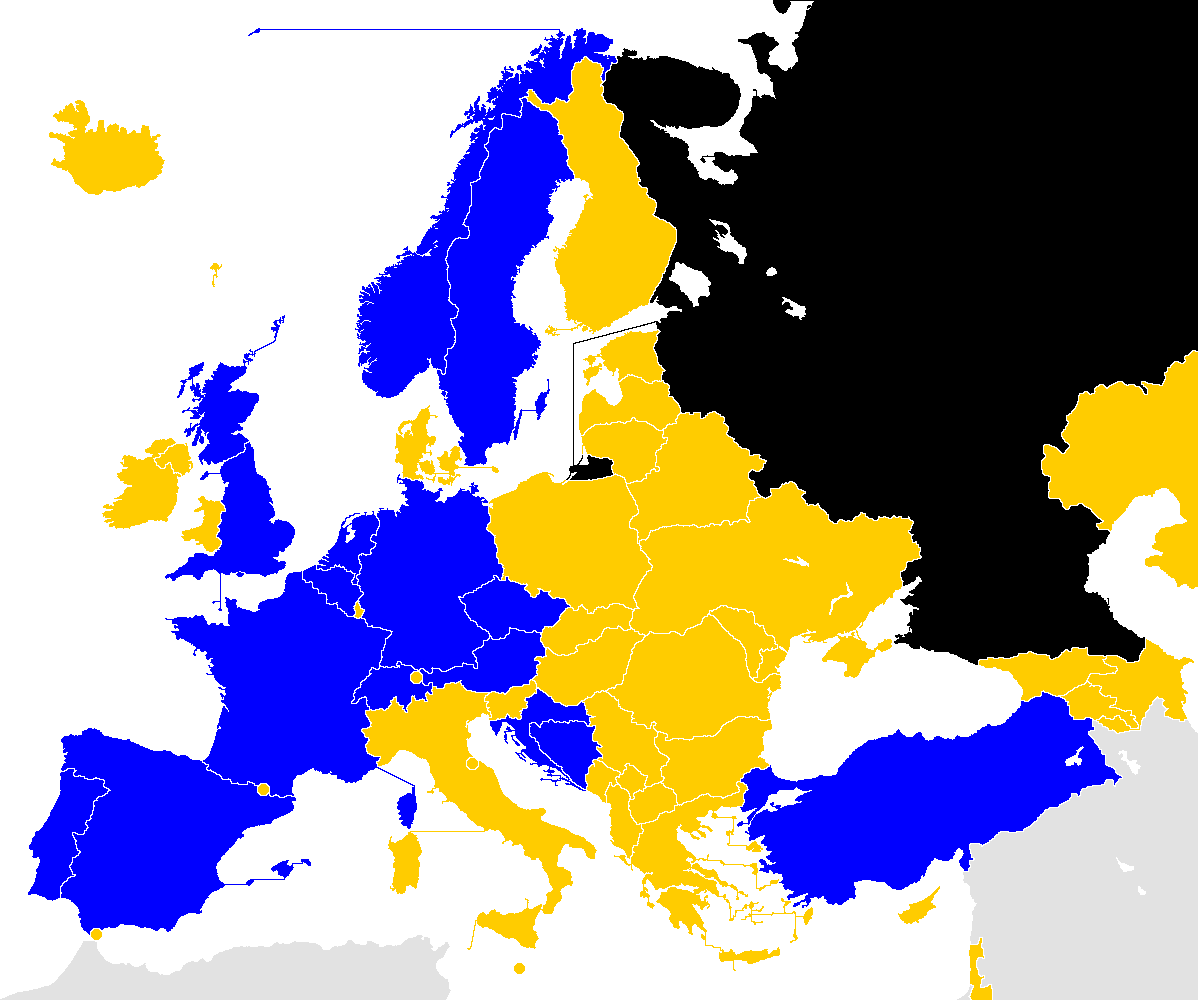
Status of UEFA countries with respect to the 2026 FIFA World Cup: Team qualified for World Cup Team eliminated Team suspended Country not a UEFA member

The following teams from UEFA qualified for the final tournament.

Team	Qualified as	Qualified on	Previous appearances in FIFA World Cup (Note: Bold indicates champions for that year. Italic indicates hosts for that year.)
England	Group K winners	14 October 2025	16 (1950, 1954, 1958, 1962, **1966**, 1970, 1982, 1986, 1990, 1998, 2002, 2006, 2010, 2014, 2018, 2022)
France	Group D winners	13 November 2025	16 (1930, 1934, 1938, 1954, 1958, 1966, 1978, 1982, 1986, **1998**, 2002, 2006, 2010, 2014, **2018**, 2022)
Croatia	Group L winners	14 November 2025	6 (1998, 2002, 2006, 2014, 2018, 2022)
Portugal	Group F winners	16 November 2025	8 (1966, 1986, 2002, 2006, 2010, 2014, 2018, 2022)
Norway	Group I winners	16 November 2025	3 (1938, 1994, 1998)
Germany (Note: From 1954 to 1990, Germany competed as West Germany. A separate team for East Germany also participated in qualification during this time, qualifying only once in 1974.)	Group A winners	17 November 2025	20 (1934, 1938, **1954**, 1958, 1962, 1966, 1970, **1974**, 1978, 1982, 1986, **1990**, 1994, 1998, 2002, 2006, 2010, **2014**, 2018, 2022)
Netherlands	Group G winners	17 November 2025	11 (1934, 1938, 1974, 1978, 1990, 1994, 1998, 2006, 2010, 2014, 2022)
Belgium	Group J winners	18 November 2025	14 (1930, 1934, 1938, 1954, 1970, 1982, 1986, 1990, 1994, 1998, 2002, 2014, 2018, 2022)
Spain	Group E winners	18 November 2025	16 (1934, 1950, 1962, 1966, 1978, 1982, 1986, 1990, 1994, 1998, 2002, 2006, **2010**, 2014, 2018, 2022)
Switzerland	Group B winners	18 November 2025	12 (1934, 1938, 1950, 1954, 1962, 1966, 1994, 2006, 2010, 2014, 2018, 2022)
Austria	Group H winners	18 November 2025	7 (1934, 1954, 1958, 1978, 1982, 1990, 1998)
Scotland	Group C winners	18 November 2025	8 (1954, 1958, 1974, 1978, 1982, 1986, 1990, 1998)
Bosnia and Herzegovina	Play-offs Path A winners	31 March 2026	1 (2014)
Sweden	Play-offs Path B winners	31 March 2026	12 (1934, 1938, 1950, 1958, 1970, 1974, 1978, 1990, 1994, 2002, 2006, 2018)
Turkey	Play-offs Path C winners	31 March 2026	2 (1954, 2002)
Czech Republic	Play-offs Path D winners	31 March 2026	9 (1934, 1938, 1954, 1958, 1962, 1970, 1982, 1990, 2006)

== Top goalscorers ==
There were 676 goals scored in 204 matches, for an average of 3.31 goals per match.

16 goals

- (Norway national football team) Erling Haaland

8 goals

- (Austria national football team) Marko Arnautović
- (England national football team) Harry Kane
- (Netherlands national football team) Memphis Depay

6 goals

- (Belgium national football team) Kevin De Bruyne
- (Bosnia and Herzegovina national football team) Edin Džeko
- (Croatia national football team) Andrej Kramarić
- (Italy national football team) Moise Kean
- (Republic of Ireland national football team) Troy Parrott
- (Spain national football team) Mikel Merino
- (Spain national football team) Mikel Oyarzabal

5 goals

- (Belgium national football team) Jérémy Doku
- (Czech Republic national football team) Patrik Schick
- (Denmark national football team) Rasmus Højlund
- (France national football team) Kylian Mbappé
- (Hungary national football team) Barnabás Varga
- (Italy national football team) Mateo Retegui
- (Norway national football team) Thelo Aasgaard
- (Norway national football team) Alexander Sørloth
- (Poland national football team) Robert Lewandowski
- (Portugal national football team) Cristiano Ronaldo
- (Wales national football team) Harry Wilson

Below are full goalscorer lists for all groups and the second round:

- Group A
- Group B
- Group C
- Group D
- Group E
- Group F
- Group G
- Group H
- Group I
- Group J
- Group K
- Group L
- Second round

== Controversies ==
During the draw on 13 December 2024, when Ukraine was drawn, the map of the country did not include the disputed area of Crimea, which led to outrage from the Ukrainian Association of Football. FIFA later apologised for the incident.

In Group I, the Norwegian Football Federation stated that they "cannot remain indifferent to Israel's disproportionate attacks on the civilian population in Gaza" during the Gaza war. In the same group, during the Estonia–Israel qualification match, Estonian fans waved a banner targeting Israeli captain Eli Dasa who played for Russian club FC Dynamo Moscow from 2022 to 2025, for comments Dasa made that he was "proud to play" in Russia. The banner was removed at the request of UEFA. Also in the same group, the Italian Football Coaches' Association called for Israel to be suspended prior to the Italy–Israel qualification match.

Following the end of qualification, some UEFA members complained that Europe's allocation of 16 places was insufficient. They also criticised the home advantage for some nations in the play-offs, believing that the games should have been hosted on neutral grounds.
