= 2026 FIFA World Cup qualification – UEFA Group I =

Association football tournament group

The 2026 FIFA World Cup qualification UEFA Group I was one of the twelve UEFA groups in the World Cup qualification tournament to decide which teams would qualify for the 2026 FIFA World Cup final tournament in Canada, Mexico and the United States. Group I consisted of five teams: Estonia, Israel, Italy, Moldova and Norway. The teams played against each other home-and-away in a round-robin format from March to November 2025. However, as Italy were involved in the Nations League A quarter-finals in March, they began their qualifying campaign in June 2025.

The group winners, Norway, qualified directly for the World Cup, while the runners-up, Italy, advanced to the second round (play-offs).

== Standings ==
Pos	Team	Pld	W	D	L	GF	GA	GD	Pts	Qualification	(Norway national football team)	(Italy national football team)	(Israel national football team)	(Estonia national football team)	(Moldova national football team)
1	Norway	8	8	0	0	37	5	+32	24	Qualification for 2026 FIFA World Cup	—	3–0	5–0	4–1	11–1
2	Italy	8	6	0	2	21	12	+9	18	Advance to play-offs	1–4	—	3–0	5–0	2–0
3	Israel	8	4	0	4	19	20	−1	12		2–4	4–5	—	2–1	4–1
4	Estonia	8	1	1	6	8	21	−13	4		0–1	1–3	1–3	—	1–1
5	Moldova	8	0	1	7	5	32	−27	1		0–5	0–2	0–4	2–3	—

Source: FIFA, UEFA
Rules for classification: Tiebreakers

== Matches ==
The fixture list was confirmed by UEFA on 13 December 2024 following the draw. Times are CET/CEST, (Note: CET (UTC+1) for matches until 29 March and from 26 October (matchday 1–2 and 9–10), and CEST (UTC+2) for matches from 30 March to 25 October 2025 (matchday 3–8).) as listed by UEFA (local times, if different, are in parentheses).

22 March 2025
18:00 (19:00 UTC+2)

Moldova	0–5	Norway
	Report (FIFA); Report (UEFA)	Ryerson 5'; Haaland 23'; Aasgaard 38'; Sørloth 43'; Dønnum 69'

Zimbru Stadium, Chișinău
Attendance: 9,342
Referee: Matej Jug (Slovenia)
22 March 2025
20:45

Israel	2–1	Estonia
Hein 23' (o.g.); Dasa 75'	Report (FIFA); Report (UEFA)	Paskotši 10'

Nagyerdei Stadion, Debrecen (Hungary) (Note: Due to the Gaza war, Israel were required to play their home matches at neutral venues until further notice.)
Attendance: 270
Referee: Nikola Dabanović (Montenegro)

25 March 2025
18:00 (19:00 UTC+2)

Moldova	2–3	Estonia
Nicolaescu 67'; Caimacov 90+1'	Report (FIFA); Report (UEFA)	Peetson 19'; Sappinen 30'; Käit 70'

Zimbru Stadium, Chișinău
Attendance: 6,112
Referee: Lawrence Visser (Belgium)
25 March 2025
20:45

Israel	2–4	Norway
Abu Fani 55'; Turgeman 90+3'	Report (FIFA); Report (UEFA)	Møller Wolfe 39'; Sørloth 59'; Ajer 65'; Haaland 83'

Nagyerdei Stadion, Debrecen (Hungary)
Attendance: 1,200
Referee: Chris Kavanagh (England)

6 June 2025
20:45 (21:45 UTC+3)

Estonia	1–3	Israel
Käit 31'	Report (FIFA); Report (UEFA)	Biton 39', 49'; Abu Fani 89' (pen.)

Lilleküla Stadium, Tallinn
Attendance: 5,967
Referee: Willy Delajod (France)
6 June 2025
20:45

Norway	3–0	Italy
Sørloth 14'; Nusa 34'; Haaland 42'	Report (FIFA); Report (UEFA)

Ullevaal Stadion, Oslo
Attendance: 25,796
Referee: José María Sánchez Martínez (Spain)

9 June 2025
20:45 (21:45 UTC+3)

Estonia	0–1	Norway
	Report (FIFA); Report (UEFA)	Haaland 62'

Lilleküla Stadium, Tallinn
Attendance: 11,577
Referee: Srđan Jovanović (Serbia)
9 June 2025
20:45

Italy	2–0	Moldova
Raspadori 40'; Cambiaso 50'	Report (FIFA); Report (UEFA)

Mapei Stadium – Città del Tricolore, Reggio Emilia
Attendance: 18,771
Referee: Urs Schnyder (Switzerland)

5 September 2025
20:45 (21:45 UTC+3)

Moldova	0–4	Israel
	Report (FIFA); Report (UEFA)	Do. Peretz 15'; Solomon 35'; Baribo 59'; Gloukh 77'

Zimbru Stadium, Chișinău
Attendance: 7,242
Referee: John Beaton (Scotland)
5 September 2025
20:45

Italy	5–0	Estonia
Kean 58'; Retegui 69', 89'; Raspadori 71'; Bastoni 90+2'	Report (FIFA); Report (UEFA)

Stadio Atleti Azzurri d'Italia, Bergamo
Attendance: 22,559
Referee: João Pinheiro (Portugal)

8 September 2025
20:45

Israel	4–5	Italy
Locatelli 16' (o.g.); Do. Peretz 52', 89'; Bastoni 87' (o.g.)	Report (FIFA); Report (UEFA)	Kean 40', 54'; Politano 58'; Raspadori 81'; Tonali 90+1'

Nagyerdei Stadion, Debrecen (Hungary)
Attendance: 2,540
Referee: Slavko Vinčić (Slovenia)
9 September 2025 (Note: The Norway v Moldova match, originally scheduled for 8 September 2025, was moved to the following day due to the 2025 Norwegian parliamentary election.)
20:45

Norway	11–1	Moldova
Myhre 6'; Haaland 11', 36', 43', 52', 83'; Ødegaard 45+1'; Aasgaard 67', 76', 79' (pen.), 90+1'	Report (FIFA); Report (UEFA)	Østigård 74' (o.g.)

Ullevaal Stadion, Oslo
Attendance: 24,605
Referee: Balázs Berke (Hungary)

11 October 2025
18:00

Norway	5–0	Israel
Khalaili 18' (o.g.); Haaland 27', 63', 72'; Nachmias 28' (o.g.)	Report (FIFA); Report (UEFA)

Ullevaal Stadion, Oslo
Attendance: 19,363
Referee: Szymon Marciniak (Poland)
11 October 2025
20:45 (21:45 UTC+3)

Estonia	1–3	Italy
Sappinen 76'	Report (FIFA); Report (UEFA)	Kean 4'; Retegui 38'; Esposito 74'

Lilleküla Stadium, Tallinn
Attendance: 11,913
Referee: Serdar Gözübüyük (Netherlands)

14 October 2025
18:00 (19:00 UTC+3)

Estonia	1–1	Moldova
Käit 12'	Report (FIFA); Report (UEFA)	Bodișteanu 64'

Lilleküla Stadium, Tallinn
Attendance: 4,731
Referee: Igor Pajač (Croatia)
14 October 2025
20:45

Italy	3–0	Israel
Retegui 45+2' (pen.), 74'; Mancini 90+3'	Report (FIFA); Report (UEFA)

Stadio Friuli, Udine
Attendance: 9,965
Referee: Clément Turpin (France)

13 November 2025
18:00

Norway	4–1	Estonia
Sørloth 50', 52'; Haaland 56', 62'	Report (FIFA); Report (UEFA)	Saarma 64'

Ullevaal Stadion, Oslo
Attendance: 25,493
Referee: Matej Jug (Slovenia)
13 November 2025
20:45 (21:45 UTC+2)

Moldova	0–2	Italy
	Report (FIFA); Report (UEFA)	Mancini 88'; Esposito 90+2'

Zimbru Stadium, Chișinău
Attendance: 9,526
Referee: Mykola Balakin (Ukraine)

16 November 2025
20:45 (21:45 UTC+2)

Israel	4–1	Moldova
Turgeman 21' (pen.); Revivo 65'; E. Peretz 85'; Baboglo 88' (o.g.)	Report (FIFA); Report (UEFA)	Nicolaescu 37'

Zimbru Stadium, Chișinău (Moldova)
Attendance: 3,312
Referee: Allard Lindhout (Netherlands)
16 November 2025
20:45

Italy	1–4	Norway
Esposito 11'	Report (FIFA); Report (UEFA)	Nusa 63'; Haaland 78', 79'; Larsen 90+3'

San Siro, Milan
Attendance: 69,020
Referee: Alejandro Hernández Hernández (Spain)

== Goalscorers ==
There were 90 goals scored in 20 matches, for an average of 4.5 goals per match.

16 goals

- (Norway national football team) Erling Haaland

5 goals

- (Italy national football team) Mateo Retegui
- (Norway national football team) Thelo Aasgaard
- (Norway national football team) Alexander Sørloth

4 goals

- (Italy national football team) Moise Kean

3 goals

- (Estonia national football team) Mattias Käit
- (Israel national football team) Dor Peretz
- (Italy national football team) Pio Esposito
- (Italy national football team) Giacomo Raspadori

2 goals

- (Estonia national football team) Rauno Sappinen
- (Israel national football team) Mohammad Abu Fani
- (Israel national football team) Dan Biton
- (Israel national football team) Dor Turgeman
- (Italy national football team) Gianluca Mancini
- (Moldova national football team) Ion Nicolaescu
- (Norway national football team) Antonio Nusa

1 goal

- (Estonia national football team) Maksim Paskotši
- (Estonia national football team) Rasmus Peetson
- (Estonia national football team) Robi Saarma
- (Israel national football team) Tai Baribo
- (Israel national football team) Eli Dasa
- (Israel national football team) Oscar Gloukh
- (Israel national football team) Eliel Peretz
- (Israel national football team) Roy Revivo
- (Israel national football team) Manor Solomon
- (Italy national football team) Alessandro Bastoni
- (Italy national football team) Andrea Cambiaso
- (Italy national football team) Matteo Politano
- (Italy national football team) Sandro Tonali
- (Moldova national football team) Ștefan Bodișteanu
- (Moldova national football team) Mihail Caimacov
- (Norway national football team) Kristoffer Ajer
- (Norway national football team) Aron Dønnum
- (Norway national football team) Felix Horn Myhre
- (Norway national football team) David Møller Wolfe
- (Norway national football team) Martin Ødegaard
- (Norway national football team) Julian Ryerson
- (Norway national football team) Jørgen Strand Larsen

1 own goal

- (Estonia national football team) Karl Hein (against Israel)
- (Israel national football team) Anan Khalaily (against Norway)
- (Israel national football team) Idan Nachmias (against Norway)
- (Italy national football team) Alessandro Bastoni (against Israel)
- (Italy national football team) Manuel Locatelli (against Israel)
- (Moldova national football team) Vladislav Baboglo (against Israel)
- (Norway national football team) Leo Østigård (against Moldova)

== Discipline ==
A player or team official was automatically suspended for the next match for the following offences:

- Receiving a red card (red card suspensions could be extended for serious offences)
- Receiving two yellow cards in two different matches (yellow card suspensions were carried forward to the play-offs, but not the finals or any other future international matches)

The following suspensions were served during the qualifying matches:

Team	Player	Offence(s)	Suspended for match(es)
Estonia	Markus Soomets	(yellow card) (yellow-red card) vs Israel (22 March 2025)	vs Moldova (25 March 2025)
Estonia	Kevor Palumets	(yellow card) (yellow-red card) vs Moldova (25 March 2025)	vs Israel (6 June 2025)
Estonia	Rasmus Peetson	(yellow card) vs Israel (22 March 2025); (yellow card) vs Moldova (25 March 2025)	vs Israel (6 June 2025)
Estonia	Henri Anier	(yellow card) vs Israel (22 March 2025); (yellow card) vs Italy (5 September 2025)	vs Italy (11 October 2025)
Italy	Alessandro Bastoni	(yellow card) vs Estonia (5 September 2025); (yellow card) vs Estonia (11 October 2025)	vs Israel (14 October 2025)
Italy	Nicolò Barella	(yellow card) vs Estonia (11 October 2025); (yellow card) vs Israel (14 October 2025)	vs Moldova (13 November 2025)
Moldova	Maxim Cojocaru	(red card) vs Estonia (25 March 2025)	vs Italy (9 June 2025)
Moldova	Vadim Rață	(yellow card) vs Norway (22 March 2025); (yellow card) vs Estonia (25 March 2025)	vs Italy (9 June 2025)
Moldova	Ion Nicolaescu	(yellow card) vs Estonia (25 March 2025); (yellow card) vs Italy (9 June 2025)	vs Israel (5 September 2025)
Moldova	Vladislav Baboglo	(yellow card) vs Estonia (25 March 2025); (yellow card) vs Estonia (14 October 2025)	vs Italy (13 November 2025)
