= 2026 FIFA World Cup qualification – UEFA Group A =

Association football tournament group

The 2026 FIFA World Cup qualification UEFA Group A was one of the twelve UEFA groups in the World Cup qualification tournament to decide which teams would qualify for the 2026 FIFA World Cup final tournament in Canada, Mexico and the United States. Group A consisted of four teams: Germany, Luxembourg, Northern Ireland and Slovakia. The teams played against each other home-and-away in a round-robin format from September to November 2025.

The group winners, Germany, qualified directly for the World Cup finals, while the runners-up, Slovakia, advanced to the second round (play-offs). In addition, Northern Ireland advanced to the play-offs via their Nations League ranking.

== Standings ==
Pos	Team	Pld	W	D	L	GF	GA	GD	Pts	Qualification	(Germany national football team)	(Slovakia national football team)	(Northern Ireland national football team)	(Luxembourg national football team)
1	Germany	6	5	0	1	16	3	+13	15	Qualification for 2026 FIFA World Cup	—	6–0	3–1	4–0
2	Slovakia	6	4	0	2	6	8	−2	12	Advance to play-offs	2–0	—	1–0	2–0
3	Northern Ireland	6	3	0	3	7	6	+1	9	Advance to play-offs via Nations League	0–1	2–0	—	1–0
4	Luxembourg	6	0	0	6	1	13	−12	0		0–2	0–1	1–3	—

Source: FIFA, UEFA
Rules for classification: Tiebreakers

== Matches ==
The fixture list was confirmed by UEFA on 13 December 2024 following the draw. Times are CET/CEST, (Note: CEST (UTC+2) for matches until 26 October 2025 (matchdays 1–4), and CET (UTC+1) for matches thereafter (matchdays 5–6).) as listed by UEFA (local times, if different, are in parentheses).

4 September 2025
20:45

Luxembourg	1–3	Northern Ireland
Dardari 30'	Report (FIFA); Report (UEFA)	Reid 7'; S. Charles 46'; Devenny 69'

Stade de Luxembourg, Luxembourg City
Attendance: 9,214
Referee: Andris Treimanis (Latvia)
4 September 2025
20:45

Slovakia	2–0	Germany
Hancko 42'; Strelec 55'	Report (FIFA); Report (UEFA)

Tehelné pole, Bratislava
Attendance: 20,013
Referee: Serdar Gözübüyük (Netherlands)

7 September 2025
20:45

Luxembourg	0–1	Slovakia
	Report (FIFA); Report (UEFA)	Rigo 90'

Stade de Luxembourg, Luxembourg City
Attendance: 8,487
Referee: Nick Walsh (Scotland)
7 September 2025
20:45

Germany	3–1	Northern Ireland
Gnabry 7'; Amiri 69'; Wirtz 72'	Report (FIFA); Report (UEFA)	Price 34'

RheinEnergieStadion, Cologne
Attendance: 43,169
Referee: Espen Eskås (Norway)

10 October 2025
20:45 (19:45 UTC+1)

Northern Ireland	2–0	Slovakia
Hrošovský 18' (o.g.); Hume 81'	Report (FIFA); Report (UEFA)

Windsor Park, Belfast
Attendance: 18,109
Referee: Glenn Nyberg (Sweden)
10 October 2025
20:45

Germany	4–0	Luxembourg
Raum 12'; Kimmich 21' (pen.), 50'; Gnabry 48'	Report (FIFA); Report (UEFA)

Rhein-Neckar-Arena, Sinsheim
Attendance: 25,249
Referee: Nenad Minaković (Serbia)

13 October 2025
20:45 (19:45 UTC+1)

Northern Ireland	0–1	Germany
	Report (FIFA); Report (UEFA)	Woltemade 31'

Windsor Park, Belfast
Attendance: 17,926
Referee: Jesús Gil Manzano (Spain)
13 October 2025
20:45

Slovakia	2–0	Luxembourg
Obert 55'; Schranz 72'	Report (FIFA); Report (UEFA)

Anton Malatinský Stadium, Trnava
Attendance: 13,010
Referee: Rade Obrenović (Slovenia)

14 November 2025
20:45

Luxembourg	0–2	Germany
	Report (FIFA); Report (UEFA)	Woltemade 49', 69'

Stade de Luxembourg, Luxembourg City
Attendance: 9,214
Referee: John Brooks (England)
14 November 2025
20:45

Slovakia	1–0	Northern Ireland
Bobček 90+1'	Report (FIFA); Report (UEFA)

Košická futbalová aréna, Košice
Attendance: 12,093
Referee: István Kovács (Romania)

17 November 2025
20:45 (19:45 UTC+0)

Northern Ireland	1–0	Luxembourg
Donley 44' (pen.)	Report (FIFA); Report (UEFA)

Windsor Park, Belfast
Attendance: 18,037
Referee: Kristo Tohver (Estonia)
17 November 2025
20:45

Germany	6–0	Slovakia
Woltemade 18'; Gnabry 29'; Sané 36', 41'; Baku 67'; Ouédraogo 79'	Report (FIFA); Report (UEFA)

Red Bull Arena, Leipzig
Attendance: 40,120
Referee: François Letexier (France)

== Goalscorers ==
There were 30 goals scored in 12 matches, for an average of 2.5 goals per match.

4 goals

- (Germany national football team) Nick Woltemade

3 goals

- (Germany national football team) Serge Gnabry

2 goals

- (Germany national football team) Joshua Kimmich
- (Germany national football team) Leroy Sané

1 goal

- (Germany national football team) Nadiem Amiri
- (Germany national football team) Ridle Baku
- (Germany national football team) Assan Ouédraogo
- (Germany national football team) David Raum
- (Germany national football team) Florian Wirtz
- (Luxembourg national football team) Aiman Dardari
- (Northern Ireland national football team) Shea Charles
- (Northern Ireland national football team) Justin Devenny
- (Northern Ireland national football team) Jamie Donley
- (Northern Ireland national football team) Trai Hume
- (Northern Ireland national football team) Isaac Price
- (Northern Ireland national football team) Jamie Reid
- (Slovakia national football team) Tomáš Bobček
- (Slovakia national football team) Dávid Hancko
- (Slovakia national football team) Adam Obert
- (Slovakia national football team) Tomáš Rigo
- (Slovakia national football team) Ivan Schranz
- (Slovakia national football team) David Strelec

1 own goal

- (Slovakia national football team) Patrik Hrošovský (against Northern Ireland)

== Discipline ==
A player or team official was automatically suspended for the next match for the following offences:

- Receiving a red card (red card suspensions could be extended for serious offences)
- Receiving two yellow cards in two different matches (yellow card suspensions were carried forward to the play-offs, but not the finals or any other future international matches)

The following suspensions were served during the qualifying matches:

Team	Player	Offence(s)	Suspended for match(es)
Germany	Antonio Rüdiger	(yellow card) vs Slovakia (4 September 2025); (yellow card) vs Northern Ireland (7 September 2025)	vs Luxembourg (10 October 2025)
Germany	Karim Adeyemi	(yellow card) vs Slovakia (4 September 2025); (yellow card) vs Northern Ireland (13 October 2025)	vs Luxembourg (14 November 2025)
Luxembourg	Seid Korać	(yellow card) (yellow-red card) vs Northern Ireland (4 September 2025)	vs Slovakia (7 September 2025)
Luxembourg	Danel Sinani	(yellow card) vs Northern Ireland (4 September 2025); (yellow card) vs Slovakia (7 September 2025)	vs Germany (10 October 2025)
Luxembourg	Dirk Carlson	(red card) vs Germany (10 October 2025)	vs Slovakia (13 October 2025)
Luxembourg	Florian Bohnert	(yellow card) vs Northern Ireland (4 September 2025); (yellow card) vs Germany (14 November 2025)	vs Northern Ireland (17 November 2025)
Luxembourg	Jeff Strasser (manager)	(yellow card) vs Germany (10 October 2025); (yellow card) vs Germany (14 November 2025)	vs Northern Ireland (17 November 2025)
Northern Ireland	Conor Bradley	(yellow card) vs Germany (7 September 2025); (yellow card) vs Slovakia (10 October 2025)	vs Germany (13 October 2025)
Northern Ireland	Ethan Galbraith	(yellow card) vs Germany (7 September 2025); (yellow card) vs Germany (13 October 2025)	vs Slovakia (14 November 2025)
Northern Ireland	Daniel Ballard	(yellow card) (yellow-red card) vs Slovakia (14 November 2025)	vs Luxembourg (17 November 2025)
Northern Ireland	George Saville	(yellow card) vs Germany (7 September 2025); (yellow card) vs Slovakia (14 November 2025)	vs Luxembourg (17 November 2025)
Slovakia	Ondrej Duda	(yellow card) vs Luxembourg (7 September 2025); (yellow card) vs Luxembourg (13 October 2025)	vs Northern Ireland (14 November 2025)
