= Mihail Caimacov =

Moldovan footballer

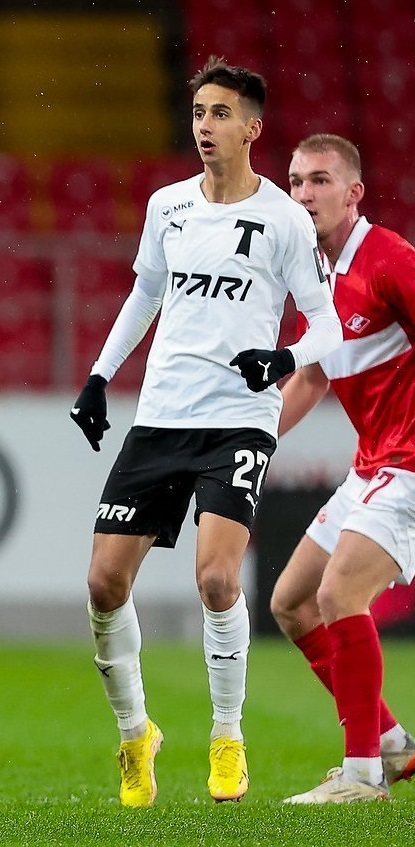
- Caimacov with Torpedo Moscow in 2022

Personal information
- Full name: Mihail Andreyevich Caimacov
- Date of birth: 22 July 1998 (age 28)
- Place of birth: Tiraspol, Moldova
- Height: 1.88 m (6 ft 2 in)
- Position: Midfielder

Team information
- Current team: Slaven Belupo
- Number: 10

Youth career
- –2016: Sheriff Tiraspol

Senior career*
Years	Team	Apps	(Gls)
2016–2017	Sheriff Tiraspol	3	(0)
2016–2017	→ Sheriff-2 Tiraspol	20	(4)
2018–2021	Osijek	1	(0)
2018–2020	→ Osijek II	16	(1)
2020	→ Olimpija Ljubljana (loan)	18	(0)
2021	→ Koper (loan)	13	(0)
2021–	Slaven Belupo	89	(4)
2022–2023	→ Torpedo Moscow (loan)	10	(1)

International career^{‡}
2018–2019	Moldova U21	5	(0)
2020–	Moldova	39	(3)
- * Club domestic league appearances and goals as of 15 June 2026 ‡ National team caps and goals as of 16 November 2025

Mihail Caimacov (born 22 July 1998) is a Moldovan footballer who plays as a midfielder for HNL club Slaven Belupo and the Moldova national team.

Caimacov has played for a number of teams in Moldova, Croatia, Slovenia and Russia. He made his national team debut in 2020 and has gone on to represent Moldova 34 times, scoring three goals.

== Club career ==
Caimacov made his professional debut for Sheriff Tiraspol in the Moldovan National Division on 24 February 2017, coming on as a substitute in the 88th minute for Evgheni Oancea in the away match against Speranța Nisporeni, which finished as a 2–0 win. In total, he made three appearances for Sheriff Tiraspol before leaving in 2017.

In 2020, he joined Osijek in Croatia. He would only play once for the team. Whilst at Osijek, he was loaned out to Slovenian clubs Olimpija Ljubljana and Koper.

After leaving Osijek in 2021, Caimacov joined Slaven Belupo. On 7 September 2022, Caimacov joined Russian Premier League club FC Torpedo Moscow on loan with an option to buy. He returned to Slaven Belupo at the end of the loan.

== International career ==
In 2018, Caimacov played for Moldova U21 in qualification for the 2019 UEFA European Under-21 Championship. In total, he was capped four times at under 21 level.

On 3 September 2020, Caimacov made his debut for Moldova in a 2020–21 UEFA Nations League match against Kosovo.

In the first matchday of 2024–25 UEFA Nations League he scored the opening goal in a 2–0 over Malta. This was one the four goals nominated for the Goal of the round.

In total, Caimacov has played 35 times for the Moldovan national team and has scored three goals.

== Career statistics ==
=== Club ===
As of 27 November 2022

Club	Season	League			Cup		Continental		Other		Total	
Club	Season	Division	Apps	Goals	Apps	Goals	Apps	Goals	Apps	Goals	Apps	Goals
Sheriff Tiraspol	2016–17	Moldovan Super Liga	2	0	0	0	–		–		2	0
Sheriff Tiraspol	2017	Moldovan Super Liga	1	0	0	0	0	0	–		1	0
Sheriff Tiraspol	Total		3	0	0	0	0	0	0	0	3	0
Osijek II	2018–19	Prva NL	13	1	–		–		–		13	1
Osijek II	2019–20	Prva NL	3	0	–		–		–		3	0
Osijek II	Total		16	1	0	0	0	0	0	0	16	1
Osijek	2019–20	HNL	1	0	0	0	0	0	–		1	0
Olimpija Ljubljana	2020–21	Slovenian PrvaLiga	18	0	1	0	2 (Note: Appearances in the UEFA Europa League)	0	–		21	0
Koper	2020–21	Slovenian PrvaLiga	13	0	2	0	–		2 (Note: Appearances in the relegation play-offs)	0	17	0
Slaven Belupo	2021–22	HNL	22	2	3	0	–		–		25	2
Slaven Belupo	2022–23	HNL	5	0	–		–		–		5	0
Slaven Belupo	Total		27	2	3	0	0	0	0	0	30	2
Torpedo Moscow	2022–23	Russian Premier League	7	0	4	0	–		–		11	0
Career total			85	3	10	0	2	0	2	0	99	3

=== International ===
As of match played 16 November 2025

Appearances and goals by national team and year
National team	Year	Apps	Goals
Moldova	2020	7	0
Moldova	2021	1	0
Moldova	2022	10	1
Moldova	2023	4	0
Moldova	2024	9	1
Moldova	2025	8	1
Total		39	3

Scores and results list Moldova's goal tally first, score column indicates score after each Caimacov goal.

List of international goals scored by Mihail Caimacov
No.	Date	Venue	Opponent	Score	Result	Competition
1	14 June 2022	Zimbru Stadium, Chișinău, Moldova	Andorra	1–0	2–1	2022–23 UEFA Nations League D
2	7 September 2024	Zimbru Stadium, Chișinău, Moldova	Malta	1–0	2–0	2024–25 UEFA Nations League D
3	25 March 2025	Zimbru Stadium, Chișinău, Moldova	Estonia	2–3	2–3	2026 FIFA World Cup qualification
