= 2026 FIFA World Cup qualification – UEFA Group D =

Association football tournament group

The 2026 FIFA World Cup qualification UEFA Group D was one of the twelve UEFA groups in the World Cup qualification tournament to decide which teams would qualify for the 2026 FIFA World Cup final tournament in Canada, Mexico and the United States. Group D consisted of four teams: Azerbaijan, France, Iceland and Ukraine. The teams played against each other home-and-away in a round-robin format from September to November 2025.

The group winners, France, qualified directly for the World Cup finals, while the runners-up, Ukraine, advanced to the second round (play-offs).

== Standings ==
Pos	Team	Pld	W	D	L	GF	GA	GD	Pts	Qualification	(France)	(Ukraine)	(Iceland)	(Azerbaijan)
1	France	6	5	1	0	16	4	+12	16	Qualification for 2026 FIFA World Cup	—	4–0	2–1	3–0
2	Ukraine	6	3	1	2	10	11	−1	10	Advance to play-offs	0–2	—	2–0	2–1
3	Iceland	6	2	1	3	13	11	+2	7		2–2	3–5	—	5–0
4	Azerbaijan	6	0	1	5	3	16	−13	1		1–3	1–1	0–2	—

Source: FIFA, UEFA
Rules for classification: Tiebreakers

== Matches ==
The fixture list was confirmed by UEFA on 13 December 2024 following the draw. Times are CET/CEST, (Note: CEST (UTC+2) for matches until 26 October 2025 (matchdays 1–4), and CET (UTC+1) for matches thereafter (matchdays 5–6).) as listed by UEFA (local times, if different, are in parentheses).

5 September 2025
20:45 (18:45 UTC+0)

Iceland	5–0	Azerbaijan
Pálsson 45+2'; Jóhannesson 47', 56'; Guðmundsson 66'; Hlynsson 73' (Note: UEFA reported the goal was scored by Kristian Hlynsson, while FIFA reported an own goal by Cəlal Hüseynov.)	Report (FIFA); Report (UEFA)

Laugardalsvöllur, Reykjavík
Attendance: 4,021
Referee: Sander van der Eijk (Netherlands)
5 September 2025
20:45

Ukraine	0–2	France
	Report (FIFA); Report (UEFA)	Olise 10'; Mbappé 82'

Wrocław Stadium, Wrocław (Poland) (Note: Due to the Russian invasion of Ukraine, Ukraine are required to play their home matches at neutral venues until further notice.)
Attendance: 38,973
Referee: Danny Makkelie (Netherlands)

9 September 2025
18:00 (20:00 UTC+4)

Azerbaijan	1–1	Ukraine
Mahmudov 72' (pen.)	Report (FIFA); Report (UEFA)	Sudakov 51'

Tofiq Bahramov Republican Stadium, Baku
Attendance: 8,450
Referee: Vassilis Fotias (Greece)
9 September 2025
20:45

France	2–1	Iceland
Mbappé 45' (pen.); Barcola 62'	Report (FIFA); Report (UEFA)	Guðjohnsen 21'

Parc des Princes, Paris
Attendance: 40,150
Referee: António Nobre (Portugal)

10 October 2025
20:45 (18:45 UTC+0)

Iceland	3–5	Ukraine
Ellertsson 34'; Guðmundsson 59', 75'	Report (FIFA); Report (UEFA)	Malinovskyi 14', 45+5'; Hutsulyak 45'; Kalyuzhnyi 85'; Ocheretko 88'

Laugardalsvöllur, Reykjavík
Attendance: 9,111
Referee: Sven Jablonski (Germany)
10 October 2025
20:45

France	3–0	Azerbaijan
Mbappé 45+2'; Rabiot 69'; Thauvin 84'	Report (FIFA); Report (UEFA)

Parc des Princes, Paris
Attendance: 40,150
Referee: Rohit Saggi (Norway)

13 October 2025
20:45 (18:45 UTC+0)

Iceland	2–2	France
Pálsson 39'; Hlynsson 70'	Report (FIFA); Report (UEFA)	Nkunku 63'; Mateta 68'

Laugardalsvöllur, Reykjavík
Attendance: 9,151
Referee: Orel Grinfeld (Israel)
13 October 2025
20:45

Ukraine	2–1	Azerbaijan
Hutsulyak 30'; Malinovskyi 64'	Report (FIFA); Report (UEFA)	Mykolenko 45+3' (o.g.)

Józef Piłsudski Cracovia Stadium, Kraków (Poland)
Attendance: 6,995
Referee: Sebastian Gishamer (Austria)

13 November 2025
18:00 (21:00 UTC+4)

Azerbaijan	0–2	Iceland
	Report (FIFA); Report (UEFA)	Guðmundsson 20'; Ingason 39'

Neftçi Arena, Baku
Attendance: 4,300
Referee: Nikola Dabanović (Montenegro)
13 November 2025
20:45

France	4–0	Ukraine
Mbappé 55' (pen.), 83'; Olise 76'; Ekitike 88'	Report (FIFA); Report (UEFA)

Parc des Princes, Paris
Attendance: 41,055
Referee: Slavko Vinčić (Slovenia)

16 November 2025
18:00 (21:00 UTC+4)

Azerbaijan	1–3	France
Dadaşov 4'	Report (FIFA); Report (UEFA)	Mateta 17'; Akliouche 30'; Magomedaliyev 45' (o.g.)

Tofiq Bahramov Republican Stadium, Baku
Attendance: 29,700
Referee: Andris Treimanis (Latvia)
16 November 2025
18:00

Ukraine	2–0	Iceland
Zubkov 83'; Hutsulyak 90+3'	Report (FIFA); Report (UEFA)

Polish Army Stadium, Warsaw (Poland)
Attendance: 20,004
Referee: Anthony Taylor (England)

== Goalscorers ==
There were 42 goals scored in 12 matches, for an average of 3.5 goals per match.

5 goals

- (France) Kylian Mbappé

4 goals

- (Iceland) Albert Guðmundsson

3 goals

- (Ukraine) Oleksiy Hutsulyak
- (Ukraine) Ruslan Malinovskyi

2 goals

- (France) Jean-Philippe Mateta
- (France) Michael Olise
- (Iceland) Ísak Bergmann Jóhannesson
- (Iceland) Victor Pálsson

1 goal

- (Azerbaijan) Renat Dadaşov
- (Azerbaijan) Emin Mahmudov
- (France) Maghnes Akliouche
- (France) Bradley Barcola
- (France) Hugo Ekitike
- (France) Christopher Nkunku
- (France) Adrien Rabiot
- (France) Florian Thauvin
- (Iceland) Mikael Egill Ellertsson
- (Iceland) Andri Guðjohnsen
- (Iceland) Kristian Hlynsson
- (Iceland) Sverrir Ingi Ingason
- (Ukraine) Ivan Kalyuzhnyi
- (Ukraine) Oleh Ocheretko
- (Ukraine) Heorhiy Sudakov
- (Ukraine) Oleksandr Zubkov

1 own goal

- (Azerbaijan) Cəlal Hüseynov (against Iceland)
- (Azerbaijan) Shakhruddin Magomedaliyev (against France)
- (Ukraine) Vitaliy Mykolenko (against Azerbaijan)

== Discipline ==
A player or team official was automatically suspended for the next match for the following offences:

- Receiving a red card (red card suspensions could be extended for serious offences)
- Receiving two yellow cards in two different matches (yellow card suspensions were carried forward to the play-offs, but not the finals or any other future international matches)

The following suspensions were served during the qualifying matches:

Team	Player	Offence(s)	Suspended for match(es)
Azerbaijan	Shakhruddin Magomedaliyev	(yellow card) vs Ukraine (9 September 2025); (yellow card) vs Ukraine (13 October 2025)	vs Iceland (13 November 2025)
Azerbaijan	Rustam Akhmedzade	(yellow card) vs France (10 October 2025); (yellow card) vs Iceland (13 November 2025)	vs France (16 November 2025)
France	Aurélien Tchouaméni	(red card) vs Iceland (9 September 2025)	vs Azerbaijan (10 October 2025) vs Iceland (13 October 2025)
France	Manu Koné	(yellow card) vs Iceland (9 September 2025); (yellow card) vs Ukraine (13 November 2025)	vs Azerbaijan (16 November 2025)
Iceland	Aron Gunnarsson	(yellow card) (yellow-red card) vs Kosovo in 2024–25 UEFA Nations League (23 March 2025)	vs Azerbaijan (5 September 2025)
Iceland	Andri Guðjohnsen	(yellow card) vs France (9 September 2025); (yellow card) vs Ukraine (10 October 2025)	vs France (13 October 2025)
