= Kosovo national football team results =

Kosovo national football team results may refer to:

Men's

- Kosovo national football team results (1942–1975)
- Kosovo national football team results (1993–2019)
  - Kosovo national football team results (unofficial matches)
- Kosovo national football team results (2020–present)

Women's

- Kosovo women's national football team results (2017–2019)
- Kosovo women's national football team results (2020–present)

Futsal

- Kosovo national futsal team results (2016–2019)
- Kosovo national futsal team results (2020–present)
