= Kosovo national football team results (2020–present) =

- Win Draw Loss Void

This is a list of Kosovo national football team results from 2020 to 2029.

== History ==
=== 2020: Year to be forgotten ===
As Kosovo could not qualify through the normal group stage, Kosovo as a D3 League winner in the 2018–19 UEFA Nations League secured participation in UEFA Euro 2020 qualifying play-offs, where it will play with North Macedonia. Two months before the UEFA Euro 2020 qualifying play-offs, Kosovo played its first match in 2020 against Sweden in Doha on January 12, this friendly match ended in a 1–0 minimal away defeat and this match was a test match, where they were tested the players from the Football Superleague of Kosovo, but also players who not had space in national team. In addition to the match against Sweden it was planned to play another friendly match against United States on January 15, but the match was canceled by United States due to the 2019–20 Persian Gulf crisis.

== Fixtures and results ==
=== 2020 ===
12 January Friendly	Sweden	1–0	Kosovo	Doha, Qatar
15:45 (CET; UTC+03:00)	Hedlund 75'	Report		Stadium: Hamad bin Khalifa Stadium; Attendance: 75; Referee: Mohammed Al-Shammari (Qatar)

15 January Friendly	United States	Canceled (Note: The match was canceled after United States cancelled training camp in Aspire Academy due to the 2019–20 Persian Gulf crisis.)	Kosovo	Doha, Qatar
				Stadium: Aspire Academy

3 September 2020–21 UEFA Nations League	Moldova	1–1	Kosovo	Parma, Italy (Note: The Moldova v Kosovo match was played in a neutral venue as there are no diplomatic relations between the two countries.)
20:45 (CEST; UTC+02:00)	Nicolaescu 20'	Report	Kololli 71'	Stadium: Stadio Ennio Tardini; Attendance: 0 (Note: Due to the COVID-19 pandemic in Europe, all matches scheduled from September 2020 to June 2021 were played behind closed doors.); Referee: Kai Erik Steen (Norway)

6 September 2020–21 UEFA Nations League	Kosovo	1–2	Greece	Pristina, Kosovo
20:45 (CEST; UTC+02:00)	B. Berisha 82'	Report	Limnios 2'; Siovas 51'	Stadium: Fadil Vokrri Stadium; Attendance: 0 Referee: Pavel Královec (Czech Republic)

8 October (Note: The North Macedonia v Kosovo match, originally scheduled for 26 March 2020, 20:45 (UTC+1) at the Toše Proeski Arena, Skopje was postponed on 17 March due to the coronavirus. The match was later rescheduled to 8 October 2020.) UEFA Euro 2020 qualifying play-offs	North Macedonia	2–1	Kosovo	Skopje, North Macedonia
20:45 (CEST; UTC+02:00)	Kololli 16' (o.g.); Ristovski 33'	Report	Hadergjonaj 33'	Stadium: Toše Proeski Arena; Attendance: 0 Referee: Danny Makkelie (Netherlands)

11 October 2020–21 UEFA Nations League	Kosovo	0–1	Slovenia	Pristina, Kosovo
20:45 (CEST; UTC+02:00)		Report	Vučkić 22'	Stadium: Fadil Vokrri Stadium; Attendance: 0 Referee: Andrew Madley (England)

14 October 2020–21 UEFA Nations League	Greece	0–0	Kosovo	Athens, Greece
20:45 (CEST; UTC+03:00)		Report		Stadium: Athens Olympic Stadium; Attendance: 0 Referee: Roi Reinshreiber (Israel)

11 November Friendly (Brotherly derby)	Albania	2–1	Kosovo	Elbasan, Albania
16:00 (CET; UTC+01:00)	Balaj 31'; Uzuni 65'	Report; Report (UEFA)	Muriqi 85' (pen.)	Stadium: Elbasan Arena; Attendance: 0 Referee: Hüseyin Göçek (Turkey)

15 November 2020–21 UEFA Nations League	Slovenia	2–1	Kosovo	Ljubljana, Slovenia
20:45 (CET; UTC+01:00)	Kurtić 63'; Iličić 90+4' (pen.)	Report	Muriqi 58'	Stadium: Stožice Stadium; Attendance: 0 Referee: Bartosz Frankowski (Poland)

18 November 2020–21 UEFA Nations League	Kosovo	1–0	Moldova	Pristina, Kosovo
20:45 (CET; UTC+01:00)	Kastrati 31'	Report		Stadium: Fadil Vokrri Stadium; Attendance: 0 Referee: Roomer Tarajev (Estonia)

=== 2021 ===
24 March Friendly	Kosovo	4–0	Lithuania	Pristina, Kosovo
20:45	Zeneli 27', 71'; Muriqi 63'; Halimi 79'	Report; Report (UEFA)		Stadium: Fadil Vokrri Stadium; Attendance: 0 Referee: Enea Jorgji (Albania)

28 March 2022 FIFA World Cup qualification	Kosovo	0–3	Sweden	Pristina, Kosovo
20:45		Report (FIFA); Report (UEFA)	Augustinsson 12'; Isak 35'; Larsson 70' (pen.)	Stadium: Fadil Vokrri Stadium; Attendance: 0 Referee: Tamás Bognár (Hungary)

31 March 2022 FIFA World Cup qualification	Spain	3–1	Kosovo	Seville, Spain
20:45	Olmo 34'; Torres 36'; Moreno 75'	Report (FIFA); Report (UEFA)	Halimi 70'	Stadium: Estadio de La Cartuja; Attendance: 0 Referee: Jakob Kehlet (Denmark)

1 June Friendly	Kosovo	4–1	San Marino	Pristina, Kosovo
18:00	Muriqi 28', 45+1', 46', 76' (pen.)	Report	D. Tomassini 85'	Stadium: Fadil Vokrri Stadium; Attendance: 0 Referee: Yaşar Kemal Uğurlu (Turkey)

4 June Friendly	Kosovo	Canceled (Note: The match was canceled after Government of Kazakhstan did not allow its national team to travel to Kosovo.)	Kazakhstan	Pristina, Kosovo
18:00				Stadium: Fadil Vokrri Stadium

4 June Friendly	Malta	1–2	Kosovo	Klagenfurt, Austria
18:00	Dimech 45+2'	Report	Rashica 19', 84'	Stadium: Wörtherseestadion; Attendance: 0 Referee: Christopher Jäger (Austria)

8 June Friendly	Kosovo	Canceled (Note: The match was canceled after Comoros is on the list of restrictions on entry into Turkey as a result of COVID-19 pandemic.)	Comoros	Manavgat, Turkey
				Stadium: Arslan Zeki Demirci Sports Complex

8 June Friendly	Kosovo	1–2	Guinea	Manavgat, Turkey
16:00 UTC+2	Manaj 90+3'	Report	Kouyaté 60'; Kanté 66' (pen.)	Stadium: Arslan Zeki Demirci Sports Complex; Attendance: 0 Referee: Sarper Barış Saka (Turkey)

11 June Friendly	Kosovo	1–0	Gambia	Manavgat, Turkey
19:00 UTC+2	Hoxha 80'	Report		Stadium: Arslan Zeki Demirci Sports Complex; Attendance: 0 Referee: Arda Kardeşler (Turkey)

2 September 2022 FIFA World Cup qualification	Georgia	0–1	Kosovo	Batumi, Georgia
18:00 (20:00; UTC+4)		Report (FIFA); Report (UEFA)	Muriqi 18'	Stadium: Batumi Stadium; Attendance: 122; Referee: Mykola Balakin (Ukraine)

5 September 2022 FIFA World Cup qualification	Kosovo	1–1	Greece	Pristina, Kosovo
20:45	Muriqi 90+2'	Report (FIFA); Report (UEFA)	Douvikas 45+2'	Stadium: Fadil Vokrri Stadium; Attendance: 1,200; Referee: François Letexier (France)

8 September 2022 FIFA World Cup qualification	Kosovo	0–2	Spain	Pristina, Kosovo
20:45		Report (FIFA); Report (UEFA)	Fornals 32'; Torres 90'	Stadium: Fadil Vokrri Stadium; Attendance: 1,200; Referee: Bobby Madden (Scotland)

9 October 2022 FIFA World Cup qualification	Sweden	3–0	Kosovo	Solna, Sweden
18:00	Forsberg 29' (pen.); Isak 62'; Quaison 79'	Report (FIFA); Report (UEFA)		Stadium: Friends Arena; Attendance: 44,123; Referee: Marco Di Bello (Italy)

12 October 2022 FIFA World Cup qualification	Kosovo	1–2	Georgia	Pristina, Kosovo
20:45	Muriqi 45' (pen.)	Report (FIFA); Report (UEFA)	Okriashvili 11'; Davitashvili 82'	Stadium: Fadil Vokrri Stadium; Attendance: 3,550; Referee: Paweł Raczkowski (Poland)

10 November Friendly	Kosovo	0–2	Jordan	Pristina, Kosovo
18:00 UTC+2		Report	Faisal 18'; Al-Dardour 85'	Stadium: Fadil Vokrri Stadium; Attendance: 1,000; Referee: Dejan Jakimovski (North Macedonia)

14 November 2022 FIFA World Cup qualification	Greece	1–1	Kosovo	Athens, Greece
20:45 (21:45; UTC+2)	Masouras 44'	Report (FIFA); Report (UEFA)	Rrahmani 76'	Stadium: Athens Olympic Stadium; Attendance: 1,388; Referee: Aleksei Kulbakov (Belarus)

=== 2022 ===
24 March Friendly	Kosovo	5–0	Burkina Faso	Pristina, Kosovo
18:00	Aliti 3'; Selmani 23'; Vojvoda 53'; Rashica 68'; Domgjoni 75'	Report		Stadium: Fadil Vokrri Stadium; Attendance: 7,000; Referee: Eldorjan Hamiti (Albania)

29 March Friendly	Switzerland	1–1	Kosovo	Zürich, Switzerland
18:00	Lotomba 61'	Report	Rashica 52'	Stadium: Letzigrund; Attendance: 20,800; Referee: Ruddy Buquet (France)

2 June 2022–23 UEFA Nations League	Cyprus	0–2	Kosovo	Larnaca, Cyprus
20:45 (21:45; UTC+3)		Report	Berisha 65'; Zhegrova 78'	Stadium: AEK Arena – Georgios Karapatakis; Attendance: 1,550; Referee: Jérôme Brisard (France)

5 June 2022–23 UEFA Nations League	Kosovo	0–1	Greece	Pristina, Kosovo
20:45		Report	Bakasetas 36'	Stadium: Fadil Vokrri Stadium; Attendance: 12,300; Referee: John Beaton (Scotland)

9 June 2022–23 UEFA Nations League	Kosovo	3–2	Northern Ireland	Pristina, Kosovo
20:45	Muriqi 9' (pen.), 52'; Bytyqi 19'	Report	Lavery 44'; Ballard 83'	Stadium: Fadil Vokrri Stadium; Attendance: 11,700; Referee: Jakob Kehlet (Denmark)

12 June 2022–23 UEFA Nations League	Greece	2–0	Kosovo	Volos, Greece
20:45 (21:45; UTC+3)	Giakoumakis 71'; Mantalos 90+9'	Report		Stadium: Panthessaliko Stadium; Attendance: 15,367; Referee: Julian Weinberger (Austria)

24 September 2022–23 UEFA Nations League	Northern Ireland	2–1	Kosovo	Belfast, Northern Ireland
18:00 (17:00; UTC+1)	Whyte 82'; Magennis 90+3'	Report	Muriqi 58'	Stadium: Windsor Park; Attendance: 17,148; Referee: Glenn Nyberg (Sweden)

27 September 2022–23 UEFA Nations League	Kosovo	5–1	Cyprus	Pristina, Kosovo
20:45	Muslija 22'; Rrudhani 45+1'; Rashani 47'; Muriqi 52', 84'	Report	Roberge 81'	Stadium: Fadil Vokrri Stadium; Attendance: 10,400; Referee: Kristo Tohver (Estonia)

16 November Friendly	Kosovo	2–2	Armenia	Pristina, Kosovo
18:00	L. M. Kastrati 67' (pen.); Rrudhani 90+3'	Report	Shaghoyan 24'; K. Hovhannisyan 82'	Stadium: Fadil Vokrri Stadium; Attendance: 2,000; Referee: Eldorjan Hamiti (Albania)

19 November Friendly (Brotherly derby)	Albania	Canceled (Note: The Albania v Kosovo match was canceled due to lack of logistics as no suitable stadium was found to play the match.)	Kosovo	Germany or Switzerland

19 November Friendly	Kosovo	1–1	Faroe Islands	Pristina, Kosovo
18:00	Bislimi 64'	Report	Radosavljevic 77'	Stadium: Fadil Vokrri Stadium; Attendance: 2,100; Referee: Juxhin Xhaja (Albania)

=== 2023 ===
25 March UEFA Euro 2024 qualifying	Israel	1–1	Kosovo	Tel Aviv, Israel
18:00 (20:00 UTC+3)	Peretz 56'	Report	Dasa 36' (o.g.)	Stadium: Bloomfield Stadium; Attendance: 28,935; Referee: Willie Collum (Scotland)

28 March UEFA Euro 2024 qualifying	Kosovo	1–1	Andorra	Pristina, Kosovo
20:45	Zhegrova 59'	Report	Rosas 61'	Stadium: Fadil Vokrri Stadium; Attendance: 12,600; Referee: Sebastian Gishamer (Austria)

16 June UEFA Euro 2024 qualifying	Kosovo	0–0	Romania	Pristina, Kosovo
20:45		Report		Stadium: Fadil Vokrri Stadium; Attendance: 12,600; Referee: Danny Makkelie (Netherlands)

19 June UEFA Euro 2024 qualifying	Belarus	2–1	Kosovo	Budapest, Hungary (Note: Due to the country's involvement in the Russian invasion of Ukraine, Belarus are required to play their home matches at neutral venues and behind closed doors until further notice.)
20:45	Morozov 73'; Ebong 75'	Report	Muriqi 87' (pen.)	Stadium: Szusza Ferenc Stadion; Attendance: 0 Referee: Julian Weinberger (Austria)

9 September UEFA Euro 2024 qualifying	Kosovo	2–2	Switzerland	Pristina, Kosovo
20:45	Muriqi 65', 90+4'	Report	Freuler 14', 79'	Stadium: Fadil Vokrri Stadium; Attendance: 12,700; Referee: Jakob Kehlet (Denmark)

12 September UEFA Euro 2024 qualifying	Romania	2–0	Kosovo	Bucharest, Romania
20:45	Stanciu 83'; Mihăilă 90+3'	Report		Stadium: Arena Națională; Attendance: 29,982; Referee: Willy Delajod (France)

12 October UEFA Euro 2024 qualifying	Andorra	0–3	Kosovo	Andorra la Vella, Andorra
20:45		Report	Rashica 26', 71'; Zeqiri 83'	Stadium: Estadi Nacional; Attendance: 1,207; Referee: Nick Walsh (Scotland)

12 November (Note: The Kosovo v Israel match, originally scheduled to be played on 15 October 2023, was postponed to 12 November 2023 due to the Gaza war.) UEFA Euro 2024 qualifying	Kosovo	1–0	Israel	Pristina, Kosovo
20:45	Rashica 41'	Report		Stadium: Fadil Vokrri Stadium; Attendance: 5,245; Referee: Ivan Kružliak (Slovakia)

18 November UEFA Euro 2024 qualifying	Switzerland	1–1	Kosovo	Basel, Switzerland
20:45	Vargas 47'	Report	Hyseni 82'	Stadium: St. Jakob-Park; Attendance: 33,000; Referee: António Nobre (Portugal)

21 November UEFA Euro 2024 qualifying	Kosovo	0–1	Belarus	Pristina, Kosovo
20:45		Report	Antilevsky 43'	Stadium: Fadil Vokrri Stadium; Attendance: 5,026; Referee: Georgi Kabakov (Bulgaria)

=== 2024 ===
22 March Friendly	Armenia	0–1	Kosovo	Yerevan, Armenia
17:00		Report	Rashica 25'	Stadium: Vazgen Sargsyan Republican Stadium; Attendance: 10,000; Referee: Irakli Kvirikashvili (Georgia)

26 March Friendly	Hungary	2–0	Kosovo	Budapest, Hungary
19:00	Szoboszlai 58'; Nagy 86'	Report		Stadium: Puskás Aréna; Attendance: 57,000; Referee: Ovidiu Hategan (Romania)

29 May Friendly	Bahrain	Canceled (Note: The Bahrain v Kosovo match was canceled due to technical reasons regarding the date of the match.)	Kosovo	Riffa, Bahrain
				Stadium: Bahrain National Stadium

5 June Friendly	Norway	3–0	Kosovo	Oslo, Norway
19:00	Haaland 15', 70', 75'	Report		Stadium: Ullevaal Stadion; Attendance: 19,634; Referee: Mikkel Redder (Denmark)

6 September 2024–25 UEFA Nations League	Kosovo	0–3	Romania	Pristina, Kosovo
20:45		Report	Man 40'; Marin 51' (pen.); Drăguș 82'	Stadium: Fadil Vokrri Stadium; Attendance: 12,872; Referee: Aliyar Aghayev (Azerbaijan)

9 September 2024–25 UEFA Nations League	Cyprus	0–4	Kosovo	Larnaca, Cyprus
18:00 (19:00 UTC+3)		Report	Muriqi 9' (pen.), 21'; Al. Rrahmani 48'; Dellova 55'	Stadium: AEK Arena – Georgios Karapatakis; Attendance: 2,041; Referee: Sebastian Gishamer (Austria)

12 October 2024–25 UEFA Nations League	Lithuania	1–2	Kosovo	Kaunas, Lithuania
15:00	Golubickas 84'	Report	Zhegrova 20'; E. Krasniqi 65'	Stadium: Darius and Girėnas Stadium; Attendance: 7,554; Referee: Ondřej Berka (Czech Republic)

15 October 2024–25 UEFA Nations League	Kosovo	3–0	Cyprus	Pristina, Kosovo
20:45	Am. Rrahmani 30'; E. Krasniqi 52'; Sahiti 70'	Report		Stadium: Fadil Vokrri Stadium; Attendance: 12,863; Referee: Matej Jug (Slovenia)

15 November 2024–25 UEFA Nations League	Romania	3–0; Awarded (Note: The Romania v Kosovo match was suspended at 0–0 during second-half stoppage time, after Romanian supporters allegedly began chanting pro-Serbian and anti-Kosovo slogans. The Kosovo team left the pitch, with the match abandoned thereafter. On 20 November 2024, UEFA announced that Kosovo was deemed to have forfeited the match, which was therefore awarded as a 3–0 win for Romania. The Football Federation of Kosovo subsequently confirmed they would appeal the decision to the Court of Arbitration for Sport.)	Kosovo	Bucharest, Romania
20:45 (21:45 UTC+2)		Report		Stadium: Arena Națională; Attendance: 48,957; Referee: Morten Krogh (Denmark)

18 November 2024–25 UEFA Nations League	Kosovo	1–0	Lithuania	Pristina, Kosovo
20:45	Jashari 5'	Report		Stadium: Fadil Vokrri Stadium; Attendance: 12,856; Referee: Kristoffer Hagenes (Norway)

=== 2025 ===
20 March 2024–25 UEFA Nations League promotion play-offs	Kosovo	2–1	Iceland	Pristina, Kosovo
20:45	Dellova 19'; Rexhbeçaj 58'	Report	Óskarsson 22'	Stadium: Fadil Vokrri Stadium; Attendance: 12,857; Referee: Serdar Gözübüyük (Netherlands)

23 March 2024–25 UEFA Nations League promotion play-offs	Iceland	1–3 (2–5 agg.)	Kosovo	Murcia, Spain (Note: Iceland played their home match at Estadio Nueva Condomina, Murcia, Spain, due to construction on Laugardalsvöllur, Reykjavík, the only Icelandic venue which meets UEFA requirements.)
18:00 (17:00 UTC±0)	Óskarsson 2'	Report	Muriqi 35', 45+3', 79'	Stadium: Estadio Nueva Condomina; Attendance: 1,553; Referee: Jesús Gil Manzano (Spain)

6 June Friendly	Kosovo	5–2	Armenia	Pristina, Kosovo
19:00	Dellova 23'; Vojvoda 61' (pen.); Emërllahu 72'; Al. Rrahmani 90', 90+3'	Report	Saipi 8' (o.g.); Spertsyan 28'	Stadium: Fadil Vokrri Stadium; Attendance: 2,000; Referee: Juxhin Xhaja (Albania)

9 June Friendly	Kosovo	4–2	Comoros	Pristina, Kosovo
19:00	Al. Rrahmani 19', 59', 79'; Asllani 90+2'	Report	Bakari 12'; Saïd 84'	Stadium: Fadil Vokrri Stadium; Attendance: 6,853; Referee: Florjan Lata (Albania)

5 September 2026 FIFA World Cup qualification	Switzerland	4–0	Kosovo	Basel, Switzerland
20:45	Akanji 22'; Embolo 25', 45'; Widmer 39'	Report		Stadium: St. Jakob-Park; Attendance: 33,996; Referee: Szymon Marciniak (Poland)

8 September 2026 FIFA World Cup qualification	Kosovo	2–0	Sweden	Pristina, Kosovo
20:45	Rexhbecaj 26'; Muriqi 42'	Report		Stadium: Fadil Vokrri Stadium; Attendance: 12,887; Referee: Allard Lindhout (Netherlands)

10 October 2026 FIFA World Cup qualification	Kosovo	0–0	Slovenia	Pristina, Kosovo
20:45		Report		Stadium: Fadil Vokrri Stadium; Attendance: 12,268; Referee: Marco Guida (Italy)

13 October 2026 FIFA World Cup qualification	Sweden	0–1	Kosovo	Gothenburg, Sweden
20:45		Report	Asllani 32'	Stadium: Ullevi; Attendance: 36,571; Referee: Danny Makkelie (Netherlands)

15 November 2026 FIFA World Cup qualification	Slovenia	0–2	Kosovo	Ljubljana, Slovenia
20:45		Report	Asllani 6'; Karničnik 64' (o.g.)	Stadium: Stožice Stadium; Attendance: 15,382; Referee: Clément Turpin (France)

18 November 2026 FIFA World Cup qualification	Kosovo	1–1	Switzerland	Pristina, Kosovo
20:45	Muslija 74'	Report	Vargas 47'	Stadium: Fadil Vokrri Stadium; Attendance: 11,215; Referee: Davide Massa (Italy)

=== 2026 ===
26 March 2026 FIFA World Cup qualification play-offs	Slovakia	3–4	Kosovo	Bratislava, Slovakia
20:45	Valjent 6'; Haraslín 45'; Strelec 90+4'	Report	Hodža 21'; Asllani 47'; Muslija 60'; Hajrizi 72'	Stadium: Tehelné pole Attendance: 20,113; Referee: Espen Eskås (Norway)

31 March 2026 FIFA World Cup qualification play-offs	Kosovo	0–1	Turkey	Pristina, Kosovo
20:45		Report	Aktürkoğlu 53'	Stadium: Fadil Vokrri Stadium; Attendance: 12,887; Referee: Michael Oliver (England)

31 May Friendly	Czech Republic	2–1	Kosovo	Prague, Czech Republic
16:00	Ladra 12'; Hložek 32'	Report	Emërllahu 80'	Stadium: Stadion Letná; Attendance: 11,102; Referee: Michal Očenáš (Slovakia)

7 June Friendly	Kosovo	3–0	Andorra	Pristina, Kosovo
20:00	Álvarez 41' (o.g.); Al. Rrahmani 53' (pen.); Matoshi 78'	Report		Stadium: Fadil Vokrri Stadium; Attendance: 5,000; Referee: Juxhin Xhaja (Albania)

24 September 2026–27 UEFA Nations League	Kosovo	1–0	Republic of Ireland	Pristina, Kosovo
20:45	Muriqi 83'	Report		Stadium: Fadil Vokrri Stadium; Attendance: 12,627; Referee: Lawrence Visser (Belgium)

27 September 2026–27 UEFA Nations League	Austria	3–1	Kosovo	Vienna, Austria
18:00	Affengruber 23'; Adamu 45+2'; Chukwuemeka 61'	Report	Zhegrova 83' (pen.)	Stadium: Ernst-Happel-Stadion; Attendance: 47,000; Referee: Nick Walsh (Scotland)

1 October 2026–27 UEFA Nations League	Israel	0–0	Kosovo	Debrecen, Hungary (Note: Due to the Gaza war, Israel are required to play their home matches at neutral venues until further notice.)
20:45 (21:45 UTC+3)		Report		Stadium: Nagyerdei Stadion; Attendance: 440; Referee: Radu Petrescu (Romania)

4 October 2026–27 UEFA Nations League	Kosovo	1–1	Austria	Pristina, Kosovo
18:00	Asllani 70'	Report	Lang 85'	Stadium: Fadil Vokrri Stadium; Attendance: 12,567; Referee: António Nobre (Portugal)

14 November 2026–27 UEFA Nations League	Kosovo	0–0	Israel	Pristina, Kosovo
15:00		Report		Stadium: Fadil Vokrri Stadium; Attendance: 12,426; Referee: Ivan Kružliak (Slovakia)

17 November 2026–27 UEFA Nations League	Republic of Ireland	3–0	Kosovo	Dublin, Ireland
20:45 (19:45 UTC+0)	Parrott 28' (pen.), 50' (pen.); Moylan 75'	Report		Stadium: Aviva Stadium; Attendance: 50,381; Referee: Edgars Maļcevs (Latvia)

Forthcoming fixtures

The following matches are scheduled:

== Kosovo against other countries ==
As of 4 October 2026

Opponent	Pld	W	D	L	GF	GA	GD	Win %	Reference
1993–present
Albania	6	1	1	4	9	11	−2	16.67	H2H results
Andorra	3	2	1	0	7	1	+6	66.67	H2H results
Armenia	3	2	1	0	8	4	+4	66.67	H2H results
Austria	2	0	1	1	2	4	−2	0.00	H2H results
Azerbaijan	2	1	1	0	4	0	+4	50.00	H2H results
Belarus	2	0	0	2	1	3	−2	0.00	H2H results
Bulgaria	2	1	1	0	4	3	+1	50.00	H2H results
Burkina Faso	2	2	0	0	7	0	+7	100.00	H2H results
Comoros	1	1	0	0	4	2	+2	100.00	H2H results
Croatia	2	0	0	2	0	7	−7	0.00	H2H results
Cyprus	4	4	0	0	14	1	+13	100.00	H2H results
Czech Republic	3	1	0	2	4	5	−1	33.33	H2H results
Denmark	1	0	1	0	2	2	+0	0.00	H2H results
England	2	0	0	2	3	9	−6	0.00	H2H results
Equatorial Guinea	1	1	0	0	2	0	+2	100.00	H2H results
Faroe Islands	4	2	2	0	5	1	+4	50.00	H2H results
Finland	2	0	1	1	1	2	−1	0.00	H2H results
Gambia	1	1	0	0	1	0	+1	100.00	H2H results
Georgia	2	1	0	1	2	2	+0	50.00	H2H results
Gibraltar	1	1	0	0	1	0	+1	100.00	H2H results
Greece	6	0	3	3	3	7	−4	0.00	H2H results
Guinea	1	0	0	1	1	2	−1	0.00	H2H results
Haiti	1	0	1	0	0	0	+0	0.00	H2H results
Hungary	1	0	0	1	0	2	−2	0.00	H2H results
Iceland	4	2	0	2	6	6	+0	50.00	H2H results
Israel	3	1	2	0	2	1	+1	33.33	H2H results
Jordan	1	0	0	1	0	2	−2	0.00	H2H results
Latvia	1	1	0	0	4	3	+1	100.00	H2H results
Lithuania	3	3	0	0	7	1	+6	100.00	H2H results
Madagascar	1	1	0	0	1	0	+1	100.00	H2H results
Malta	3	3	0	0	10	2	+8	100.00	H2H results
Moldova	2	1	1	0	2	1	+1	50.00	H2H results
Monaco	1	1	0	0	7	1	+6	100.00	H2H results
Montenegro	2	1	1	0	3	1	+2	50.00	H2H results
North Macedonia	1	0	0	1	1	2	−1	0.00	H2H results
Northern Cyprus	1	0	0	1	0	1	−1	0.00	H2H results
Northern Ireland	2	1	0	1	4	4	+0	50.00	H2H results
Norway	1	0	0	1	0	3	−3	0.00	H2H results
Oman	1	1	0	0	1	0	+1	100.00	H2H results
Republic of Ireland	1	1	0	0	1	0	+1	100.00	H2H results
Romania	4	0	1	3	0	8	−8	0.00	H2H results
San Marino	1	1	0	0	4	1	+3	100.00	H2H results
Sápmi	1	1	0	0	4	1	+3	100.00	
Saudi Arabia	1	1	0	0	1	0	+1	100.00	H2H results
Senegal	1	0	0	1	1	3	−2	0.00	H2H results
Slovakia	1	1	0	0	4	3	+1	100.00	H2H results
Slovenia	4	1	1	2	3	3	+0	25.00	H2H results
Spain	2	0	0	2	1	5	−4	0.00	H2H results
Sweden	5	2	0	3	3	7	−4	40.00	H2H results
Switzerland	5	0	4	1	5	9	−4	0.00	H2H results
Turkey	4	0	0	4	2	13	−11	0.00	H2H results H2H results*
Ukraine	2	0	0	2	0	5	−5	0.00	H2H results
50 countries	111	45	24	42	163	147	+16	40.54	All H2H results
