= 2024–25 UEFA Nations League C =

Tournament details
- Dates: 5 September – 19 November 2024
- Teams: 16
- Promoted: Kosovo; North Macedonia; Northern Ireland; Romania; Sweden
- Relegated: Azerbaijan; Lithuania

Tournament statistics
- Matches played: 48
- Goals scored: 115 (2.4 per match) (Note: The goal tally takes into account the original result of fixtures that were subsequently forfeited, not the awarded scoreline.)
- Attendance: 491,869 (10,247 per match)
- Top scorer(s): (Sweden) Viktor Gyökeres (9 goals)

The 2024–25 UEFA Nations League C was the third division of the 2024–25 edition of the UEFA Nations League, the fourth season of the international football competition involving the men's national teams of the 55 member associations of UEFA.

== Format ==
League C consisted of 16 UEFA members ranked from 33–48 in the 2024–25 UEFA Nations League access list, split into four groups of four. Each team played six matches within their group, using the home-and-away round-robin format on double matchdays in September, October, and November 2024. The winners of each group were promoted to the 2026–27 UEFA Nations League B, and the two worst-ranked fourth-placed teams were relegated to the 2026–27 UEFA Nations League D. In addition, the second-placed teams of each group and the two best-ranked fourth-placed teams advanced to the promotion/relegation play-offs, played home-and-away over two legs. The League C second-placed teams participated in promotion play-offs against the third-placed teams from League B in March 2025, while the two best-ranked League C fourth-placed teams will participate in relegation play-offs against the second-placed teams from League D in March 2026. In the play-offs, teams from the higher leagues will host the second leg, with the winners of each tie participating in the higher league for the next Nations League season, while the losers will enter the lower league.

== Teams ==
=== Team changes ===
The following were the team changes in League C from the 2022–23 season:

Incoming
| Relegated from Nations League B | Promoted from Nations League D |
|---|---|
| Armenia; Romania; Sweden | Estonia; Latvia |

Outgoing
| Promoted to Nations League B | Relegated to Nations League D |
|---|---|
| Georgia; Greece; Kazakhstan; Turkey | Gibraltar |

On 2 May 2022, Russia were suspended and automatically relegated from League B due to their country's invasion of Ukraine. Russia were due to participate in League C for the 2024–25 season, but they were instead banned from the Nations League because the suspension was still active at the time of UEFA's entry deadline. Therefore, only one team (Gibraltar) was relegated to League D and two teams (Estonia and Latvia) were promoted from League D, so that the 2024–25 League C season would still have 16 teams.

=== Seeding ===
In the 2024–25 access list, UEFA ranked teams based on the 2022–23 Nations League overall ranking. The seeding pots for the league phase were confirmed on 2 December 2023, and were based on the access list ranking.

Pot 1
| Team | Rank |
|---|---|
| Romania | 33 |
| Sweden | 34 |
| Armenia | 35 |
| Luxembourg | 36 |

Pot 2
| Team | Rank |
|---|---|
| Azerbaijan | 37 |
| Kosovo | 38 |
| Bulgaria | 39 |
| Faroe Islands | 40 |

Pot 3
| Team | Rank |
|---|---|
| North Macedonia | 41 |
| Slovakia | 42 |
| Northern Ireland | 43 |
| Cyprus | 44 |

Pot 4
| Team | Rank |
|---|---|
| Belarus | 45 |
| Lithuania (Note: The identity of the play-out winners was not known at the time of the draw.) | 46 |
| Estonia | 47 |
| Latvia | 48 |

The draw for the league phase took place at the Maison de la Mutualité in Paris, France, on 8 February 2024, 18:00 CET. Each group contained one team from each pot. For political reasons, Armenia and Azerbaijan (due to the Nagorno-Karabakh conflict) could not be drawn in the same group.

== Groups ==
The fixture list was confirmed by UEFA on 9 February 2024, the day following the draw.

Times are CET/CEST, (Note: CEST (UTC+2) for matchdays 1–4 (September and October 2024), CET (UTC+1) for matchdays 5–6 (November 2024).) as listed by UEFA (local times, if different, are in parentheses).

=== Group 1 ===
| Pos | Team | Pld | W | D | L | GF | GA | GD | Pts | Promotion, qualification or relegation | (Sweden) | (Slovakia) | (Estonia) | (Azerbaijan) |
|---|---|---|---|---|---|---|---|---|---|---|---|---|---|---|
| 1 | Sweden (P) | 6 | 5 | 1 | 0 | 19 | 4 | +15 | 16 | Promotion to League B | — | 2–1 | 3–0 | 6–0 |
| 2 | Slovakia | 6 | 4 | 1 | 1 | 10 | 5 | +5 | 13 | Qualification for promotion play-offs | 2–2 | — | 1–0 | 2–0 |
| 3 | Estonia | 6 | 1 | 1 | 4 | 3 | 9 | −6 | 4 | | 0–3 | 0–1 | — | 3–1 |
| 4 | Azerbaijan (R) | 6 | 0 | 1 | 5 | 3 | 17 | −14 | 1 | Relegation to League D | 1–3 | 1–3 | 0–0 | — |

Source: UEFA
Rules for classification: Tiebreakers
(P) Promoted; (R) Relegated
5 September 2024
18:00 (20:00 UTC+4)

| Azerbaijan | 1–3 | Sweden |
|---|---|---|
| Dadashov 82' | Report | Isak 65', 71'; Gyökeres 80' (pen.) |

Tofiq Bahramov Republican Stadium, Baku
Attendance: 9,450
Referee: Balázs Berke (Hungary)
5 September 2024
20:45 (21:45 UTC+3)

| Estonia | 0–1 | Slovakia |
|---|---|---|
| | Report | Suslov 70' |

Lilleküla Stadium, Tallinn
Attendance: 6,128
Referee: Matej Jug (Slovenia)

8 September 2024
18:00

| Slovakia | 2–0 | Azerbaijan |
|---|---|---|
| Duda 22' (pen.); Strelec 26' | Report |

Košická futbalová aréna, Košice
Attendance: 11,435
Referee: Damian Sylwestrzak (Poland)
8 September 2024
20:45

| Sweden | 3–0 | Estonia |
|---|---|---|
| Gyökeres 30', 44'; Isak 40' | Report |

Strawberry Arena, Solna
Attendance: 14,858
Referee: Sven Jablonski (Germany)

11 October 2024
18:00 (19:00 UTC+3)

| Estonia | 3–1 | Azerbaijan |
|---|---|---|
| Yakovlev 32'; Sinyavskiy 45+2'; Shein 71' | Report | Bayramov 45+1' (pen.) |

Lilleküla Stadium, Tallinn
Attendance: 6,034
Referee: Rob Harvey (Republic of Ireland)
11 October 2024
20:45

| Slovakia | 2–2 | Sweden |
|---|---|---|
| Strelec 44', 72' | Report | Ayari 25'; Sema 32' |

Tehelné pole, Bratislava
Attendance: 15,381
Referee: Maurizio Mariani (Italy)

14 October 2024
18:00 (20:00 UTC+4)

| Azerbaijan | 1–3 | Slovakia |
|---|---|---|
| Bayramov 38' | Report | Mammadov 15' (o.g.); Haraslín 75'; Ďuriš 86' |

Tofiq Bahramov Republican Stadium, Baku
Attendance: 4,269
Referee: Rohit Saggi (Norway)
14 October 2024
20:45 (21:45 UTC+3)

| Estonia | 0–3 | Sweden |
|---|---|---|
| | Report | Nanasi 29', 37'; Gyökeres 66' |

Lilleküla Stadium, Tallinn
Attendance: 4,706
Referee: Juxhin Xhaja (Albania)

16 November 2024
15:00 (18:00 UTC+4)

| Azerbaijan | 0–0 | Estonia |
|---|---|---|
| | Report |

Gabala City Stadium, Gabala
Attendance: 1,600
Referee: John Beaton (Scotland)
16 November 2024
20:45

| Sweden | 2–1 | Slovakia |
|---|---|---|
| Gyökeres 3'; Isak 48' | Report | Hancko 19' |

Strawberry Arena, Solna
Attendance: 36,417
Referee: Mykola Balakin (Ukraine)

19 November 2024
20:45

| Slovakia | 1–0 | Estonia |
|---|---|---|
| Strelec 72' | Report |

Anton Malatinský Stadium, Trnava
Attendance: 4,317
Referee: Mikkel Redder (Denmark)
19 November 2024
20:45

| Sweden | 6–0 | Azerbaijan |
|---|---|---|
| Kulusevski 10', 57'; Gyökeres 26', 37', 58', 70' | Report |

Strawberry Arena, Solna
Attendance: 10,127
Referee: Paweł Raczkowski (Poland)

=== Group 2 ===
| Pos | Team | Pld | W | D | L | GF | GA | GD | Pts | Promotion, qualification or relegation | (Romania) | (Kosovo) | (Cyprus) | (Lithuania) |
|---|---|---|---|---|---|---|---|---|---|---|---|---|---|---|
| 1 | Romania (P) | 6 | 6 | 0 | 0 | 18 | 3 | +15 | 18 | Promotion to League B | — | 3–0 (Note: The Romania v Kosovo match was suspended at 0–0 during second-half stoppage time, after the Kosovo team left the pitch, with the match abandoned thereafter. The match was subsequently awarded as a 3–0 win for Romania.) | 4–1 | 3–1 |
| 2 | Kosovo (O, P) | 6 | 4 | 0 | 2 | 10 | 7 | +3 | 12 | Qualification for promotion play-offs | 0–3 | — | 3–0 | 1–0 |
| 3 | Cyprus | 6 | 2 | 0 | 4 | 4 | 15 | −11 | 6 | | 0–3 | 0–4 | — | 2–1 |
| 4 | Lithuania (R) | 6 | 0 | 0 | 6 | 4 | 11 | −7 | 0 | Relegation to League D | 1–2 | 1–2 | 0–1 | — |

Source: UEFA
Rules for classification: Tiebreakers
(O) Play-off winners; (P) Promoted; (R) Relegated
Notes:
6 September 2024
18:00 (19:00 UTC+3)

| Lithuania | 0–1 | Cyprus |
|---|---|---|
| | Report | Pittas 34' |

Sūduva Stadium, Marijampolė
Attendance: 4,905
Referee: Igor Pajac (Croatia)
6 September 2024
20:45

| Kosovo | 0–3 | Romania |
|---|---|---|
| | Report | Man 40'; R. Marin 51' (pen.); Drăguș 82' |

Fadil Vokrri Stadium, Pristina
Attendance: 12,872
Referee: Aliyar Aghayev (Azerbaijan)

9 September 2024
18:00 (19:00 UTC+3)

| Cyprus | 0–4 | Kosovo |
|---|---|---|
| | Report | Muriqi 9' (pen.), 21'; Al. Rrahmani 48'; Dellova 55' |

AEK Arena – Georgios Karapatakis, Larnaca
Attendance: 2,041
Referee: Sebastian Gishamer (Austria)
9 September 2024
20:45 (21:45 UTC+3)

| Romania | 3–1 | Lithuania |
|---|---|---|
| Mihăilă 4'; R. Marin 87' (pen.); Mitriță 90+2' | Report | Kučys 34' |

Stadionul Steaua, Bucharest
Attendance: 28,168
Referee: Rade Obrenović (Slovenia)

12 October 2024
15:00 (16:00 UTC+3)

| Lithuania | 1–2 | Kosovo |
|---|---|---|
| Golubickas 84' | Report | Zhegrova 20'; E. Krasniqi 65' |

Darius and Girėnas Stadium, Kaunas
Attendance: 7,554
Referee: Ondřej Berka (Czech Republic)
12 October 2024
20:45 (21:45 UTC+3)

| Cyprus | 0–3 | Romania |
|---|---|---|
| | Report | Man 16'; R. Marin 25' (pen.); Drăgușin 36' |

AEK Arena – Georgios Karapatakis, Larnaca
Attendance: 6,092
Referee: Sascha Stegemann (Germany)

15 October 2024
20:45

| Kosovo | 3–0 | Cyprus |
|---|---|---|
| Am. Rrahmani 30'; E. Krasniqi 52'; Sahiti 70' | Report |

Fadil Vokrri Stadium, Pristina
Attendance: 12,863
Referee: Matej Jug (Slovenia)
15 October 2024
20:45 (21:45 UTC+3)

| Lithuania | 1–2 | Romania |
|---|---|---|
| Kučys 7' (pen.) | Report | R. Marin 18' (pen.); Drăguș 65' |

Darius and Girėnas Stadium, Kaunas
Attendance: 2,585
Referee: Nick Walsh (Scotland)

15 November 2024
18:00 (19:00 UTC+2)

| Cyprus | 2–1 | Lithuania |
|---|---|---|
| Kastanos 18'; Tzionis 63' | Report | Gineitis 47' |

AEK Arena – Georgios Karapatakis, Larnaca
Attendance: 1,733
Referee: Nenad Minaković (Serbia)
15 November 2024
20:45 (21:45 UTC+2)

| Romania | 3–0 Awarded (Note: The Romania v Kosovo match was suspended at 0–0 during second-half stoppage time, after Romanian supporters allegedly began chanting pro-Serbian and anti-Kosovo slogans. The Kosovo team left the pitch, with the match abandoned thereafter. On 20 November 2024, UEFA announced that Kosovo was deemed to have forfeited the match, which was therefore awarded as a 3–0 win for Romania. The Football Federation of Kosovo subsequently appealed the decision to the Court of Arbitration for Sport, which was dismissed by CAS on 5 May 2025.) | Kosovo |
|---|---|---|
| | Report |

Arena Națională, Bucharest
Attendance: 48,957
Referee: Morten Krogh (Denmark)

18 November 2024
20:45

| Kosovo | 1–0 | Lithuania |
|---|---|---|
| Jashari 5' | Report |

Fadil Vokrri Stadium, Pristina
Attendance: 12,856
Referee: Kristoffer Hagenes (Norway)
18 November 2024
20:45 (21:45 UTC+2)

| Romania | 4–1 | Cyprus |
|---|---|---|
| Bîrligea 2'; R. Marin 41', 80'; Coman 83' | Report | Pittas 52' |

Arena Națională, Bucharest
Attendance: 45,318
Referee: Luca Pairetto (Italy)

=== Group 3 ===
| Pos | Team | Pld | W | D | L | GF | GA | GD | Pts | Promotion, qualification or relegation | (Northern Ireland) | (Bulgaria) | (Belarus) | (Luxembourg) |
|---|---|---|---|---|---|---|---|---|---|---|---|---|---|---|
| 1 | Northern Ireland (P) | 6 | 3 | 2 | 1 | 11 | 3 | +8 | 11 | Promotion to League B | — | 5–0 | 2–0 | 2–0 |
| 2 | Bulgaria | 6 | 2 | 3 | 1 | 3 | 6 | −3 | 9 | Qualification for promotion play-offs | 1–0 | — | 1–1 | 0–0 |
| 3 | Belarus | 6 | 1 | 4 | 1 | 3 | 4 | −1 | 7 | | 0–0 | 0–0 | — | 1–1 |
| 4 | Luxembourg (O) | 6 | 0 | 3 | 3 | 3 | 7 | −4 | 3 | Qualification for relegation play-offs | 2–2 | 0–1 | 0–1 | — |

Source: UEFA
Rules for classification: Tiebreakers
(O) Play-off winners; (P) Promoted
5 September 2024
20:45

| Belarus | 0–0 | Bulgaria |
|---|---|---|
| | Report |

ZTE Arena, Zalaegerszeg (Hungary) (Note: Due to the Belarusian involvement in the Russian invasion of Ukraine, Belarus were required to play their home matches at neutral venues, and behind closed doors, until further notice.)
Attendance: 0
Referee: Ovidiu Hațegan (Romania)
5 September 2024
20:45 (19:45 UTC+1)

| Northern Ireland | 2–0 | Luxembourg |
|---|---|---|
| McNair 11'; Ballard 16' | Report |

Windsor Park, Belfast
Attendance: 17,213
Referee: Marian Barbu (Romania)

8 September 2024
15:00

| Luxembourg | 0–1 | Belarus |
|---|---|---|
| | Report | Gromyko 76' |

Stade de Luxembourg, Luxembourg
Attendance: 6,820
Referee: Lawrence Visser (Belgium)
8 September 2024
18:00 (19:00 UTC+3)

| Bulgaria | 1–0 | Northern Ireland |
|---|---|---|
| Despodov 40' | Report |

Hristo Botev Stadium, Plovdiv
Attendance: 14,300
Referee: Tasos Sidiropoulos (Greece)

12 October 2024
18:00 (19:00 UTC+3)

| Bulgaria | 0–0 | Luxembourg |
|---|---|---|
| | Report |

Hristo Botev Stadium, Plovdiv
Attendance: 15,800
Referee: David Šmajc (Slovenia)
12 October 2024
20:45

| Belarus | 0–0 | Northern Ireland |
|---|---|---|
| | Report |

ZTE Arena, Zalaegerszeg (Hungary)
Attendance: 0
Referee: Henrik Nalbandyan (Armenia)

15 October 2024
20:45

| Belarus | 1–1 | Luxembourg |
|---|---|---|
| Politevich 54' | Report | Rodrigues 78' (pen.) |

ZTE Arena, Zalaegerszeg (Hungary)
Attendance: 0
Referee: Atilla Karaoğlan (Turkey)
15 October 2024
20:45 (19:45 UTC+1)

| Northern Ireland | 5–0 | Bulgaria |
|---|---|---|
| Price 15', 29', 81'; Mitov 32' (o.g.); Magennis 89' | Report |

Windsor Park, Belfast
Attendance: 17,891
Referee: Jérôme Brisard (France)

15 November 2024
20:45

| Luxembourg | 0–1 | Bulgaria |
|---|---|---|
| | Report | Kraev 23' |

Stade de Luxembourg, Luxembourg
Attendance: 8,307
Referee: Juri Frischer (Estonia)
15 November 2024
20:45 (19:45 UTC+0)

| Northern Ireland | 2–0 | Belarus |
|---|---|---|
| Ballard 50'; D. Charles 63' (pen.) | Report |

Windsor Park, Belfast
Attendance: 18,044
Referee: Luis Godinho (Portugal)

18 November 2024
20:45 (21:45 UTC+2)

| Bulgaria | 1–1 | Belarus |
|---|---|---|
| Panayotov 12' | Report | Kavalyow 70' |

Vasil Levski National Stadium, Sofia
Attendance: 2,200
Referee: Allard Lindhout (Netherlands)
18 November 2024
20:45

| Luxembourg | 2–2 | Northern Ireland |
|---|---|---|
| Korać 72'; Rodrigues 75' | Report | Price 19'; Bradley 50' |

Stade de Luxembourg, Luxembourg
Attendance: 6,870
Referee: Elchin Masiyev (Azerbaijan)

=== Group 4 ===
| Pos | Team | Pld | W | D | L | GF | GA | GD | Pts | Promotion, qualification or relegation | (North Macedonia) | (Armenia) | (Faroe Islands) | (Latvia) |
|---|---|---|---|---|---|---|---|---|---|---|---|---|---|---|
| 1 | North Macedonia (P) | 6 | 5 | 1 | 0 | 10 | 1 | +9 | 16 | Promotion to League B | — | 2–0 | 1–0 | 1–0 |
| 2 | Armenia | 6 | 2 | 1 | 3 | 8 | 9 | −1 | 7 | Qualification for promotion play-offs | 0–2 | — | 0–1 | 4–1 |
| 3 | Faroe Islands | 6 | 1 | 3 | 2 | 5 | 6 | −1 | 6 | | 1–1 | 2–2 | — | 1–1 |
| 4 | Latvia (O) | 6 | 1 | 1 | 4 | 4 | 11 | −7 | 4 | Qualification for relegation play-offs | 0–3 | 1–2 | 1–0 | — |

Source: UEFA
Rules for classification: Tiebreakers
(O) Play-off winners; (P) Promoted
7 September 2024
15:00 (14:00 UTC+1)

| Faroe Islands | 1–1 | North Macedonia |
|---|---|---|
| Davidsen 9' (pen.) | Report | Bardhi 49' (pen.) |

Tórsvøllur, Tórshavn
Attendance: 2,057
Referee: Manfredas Lukjančukas (Lithuania)
7 September 2024
18:00 (20:00 UTC+4)

| Armenia | 4–1 | Latvia |
|---|---|---|
| Bichakhchyan 6'; Dubra 35' (o.g.); Zelarayán 48'; Spertsyan 86' | Report | Arutyunyan 9' (o.g.) |

Vazgen Sargsyan Republican Stadium, Yerevan
Attendance: 12,437
Referee: Nenad Minaković (Serbia)

10 September 2024
18:00 (19:00 UTC+3)

| Latvia | 1–0 | Faroe Islands |
|---|---|---|
| Varslavāns 64' | Report |

Skonto Stadium, Riga
Attendance: 5,808
Referee: Duje Strukan (Croatia)
10 September 2024
20:45

| North Macedonia | 2–0 | Armenia |
|---|---|---|
| Bardhi 70'; Miovski 78' | Report |

Toše Proeski Arena, Skopje
Attendance: 6,829
Referee: Harm Osmers (Germany)

10 October 2024
18:00 (19:00 UTC+3)

| Latvia | 0–3 | North Macedonia |
|---|---|---|
| | Report | Atanasov 35'; Qamili 70'; Elmas 90+3' |

Skonto Stadium, Riga
Attendance: 5,001
Referee: Jakob Sundberg (Denmark)
10 October 2024
20:45 (19:45 UTC+1)

| Faroe Islands | 2–2 | Armenia |
|---|---|---|
| Benjaminsen 37'; Bjartalíð 85' | Report | Zelarayán 44'; Manvelyan 90+3' |

Tórsvøllur, Tórshavn
Attendance: 1,852
Referee: Oleksii Derevinskyi (Ukraine)

13 October 2024
18:00 (20:00 UTC+4)

| Armenia | 0–2 | North Macedonia |
|---|---|---|
| | Report | Miovski 72'; Alimi 85' |

Vazgen Sargsyan Republican Stadium, Yerevan
Attendance: 14,371
Referee: Stuart Attwell (England)
13 October 2024
20:45 (19:45 UTC+1)

| Faroe Islands | 1–1 | Latvia |
|---|---|---|
| Sørensen 40' | Report | Šits 69' |

Tórsvøllur, Tórshavn
Attendance: 2,017
Referee: Philip Farrugia (Malta)

14 November 2024
18:00 (21:00 UTC+4)

| Armenia | 0–1 | Faroe Islands |
|---|---|---|
| | Report | Davidsen 33' (pen.) |

Vazgen Sargsyan Republican Stadium, Yerevan
Attendance: 6,043
Referee: Tasos Sidiropoulos (Greece)
14 November 2024
20:45

| North Macedonia | 1–0 | Latvia |
|---|---|---|
| Serafimov 57' | Report |

Toše Proeski Arena, Skopje
Attendance: 8,851
Referee: Goga Kikacheishvili (Georgia)

17 November 2024
15:00 (16:00 UTC+2)

| Latvia | 1–2 | Armenia |
|---|---|---|
| Uldriķis 70' | Report | Spertsyan 48'; Miranyan 74' |

Skonto Stadium, Riga
Attendance: 5,543
Referee: Georgi Kabakov (Bulgaria)
17 November 2024
15:00

| North Macedonia | 1–0 | Faroe Islands |
|---|---|---|
| Miovski 62' | Report |

Toše Proeski Arena, Skopje
Attendance: 7,450
Referee: Daniel Schlager (Germany)

== Ranking of fourth-placed teams ==
| Pos | Grp | Team | Pld | W | D | L | GF | GA | GD | Pts | Qualification or relegation |
|---|---|---|---|---|---|---|---|---|---|---|---|
| 1 | C4 | Latvia | 6 | 1 | 1 | 4 | 4 | 11 | −7 | 4 | Qualification for relegation play-offs |
| 2 | C3 | Luxembourg | 6 | 0 | 3 | 3 | 3 | 7 | −4 | 3 | Qualification for relegation play-offs |
| 3 | C1 | Azerbaijan (R) | 6 | 0 | 1 | 5 | 3 | 17 | −14 | 1 | Relegation to League D |
| 4 | C2 | Lithuania (R) | 6 | 0 | 0 | 6 | 4 | 11 | −7 | 0 | Relegation to League D |

Source: UEFA
Rules for classification: Ranking criteria
(R) Relegated

== Goalscorers ==
There were 115 goals scored in 48 matches, for an average of 2.4 goals per match.

9 goals

- (Sweden men's national football team) Viktor Gyökeres

6 goals

- (Romania national football team) Răzvan Marin

4 goals

- (Northern Ireland national football team) Isaac Price
- (Slovakia national football team) David Strelec
- (Sweden men's national football team) Alexander Isak

3 goals

- (North Macedonia national football team) Bojan Miovski

2 goals

- (Armenia national football team) Eduard Spertsyan
- (Armenia national football team) Lucas Zelarayán
- (Azerbaijan national football team) Toral Bayramov
- (Cyprus national football team) Ioannis Pittas
- (Faroe Islands national football team) Viljormur Davidsen
- (Kosovo national football team) Ermal Krasniqi
- (Kosovo national football team) Vedat Muriqi
- (Lithuania national football team) Armandas Kučys
- (Luxembourg national football team) Gerson Rodrigues
- (North Macedonia national football team) Enis Bardhi
- (Northern Ireland national football team) Daniel Ballard
- (Romania national football team) Denis Drăguș
- (Romania national football team) Dennis Man
- (Sweden men's national football team) Dejan Kulusevski
- (Sweden men's national football team) Sebastian Nanasi

1 goal

- (Armenia national football team) Vahan Bichakhchyan
- (Armenia national football team) Gor Manvelyan
- (Armenia national football team) Artur Miranyan
- (Azerbaijan national football team) Renat Dadashov
- (Belarus national football team) Valery Gromyko
- (Belarus national football team) Yury Kavalyow
- (Belarus national football team) Sergei Politevich
- (Bulgaria national football team) Kiril Despodov
- (Bulgaria national football team) Andrian Kraev
- (Bulgaria national football team) Vasil Panayotov
- (Cyprus national football team) Grigoris Kastanos
- (Cyprus national football team) Marinos Tzionis
- (Estonia national football team) Rocco Robert Shein
- (Estonia national football team) Vlasiy Sinyavskiy
- (Estonia national football team) Ioan Yakovlev
- (Faroe Islands national football team) Jann Benjaminsen
- (Faroe Islands national football team) Jóannes Bjartalíð
- (Faroe Islands national football team) Hanus Sørensen
- (Kosovo national football team) Lumbardh Dellova
- (Kosovo national football team) Muharrem Jashari
- (Kosovo national football team) Albion Rrahmani
- (Kosovo national football team) Amir Rrahmani
- (Kosovo national football team) Emir Sahiti
- (Kosovo national football team) Edon Zhegrova
- (Latvia national football team) Dario Šits
- (Latvia national football team) Roberts Uldriķis
- (Latvia national football team) Renārs Varslavāns
- (Lithuania national football team) Gvidas Gineitis
- (Lithuania national football team) Paulius Golubickas
- (Luxembourg national football team) Seid Korać
- (North Macedonia national football team) Isnik Alimi
- (North Macedonia national football team) Jani Atanasov
- (North Macedonia national football team) Eljif Elmas
- (North Macedonia national football team) Lirim Qamili
- (North Macedonia national football team) Nikola Serafimov
- (Northern Ireland national football team) Conor Bradley
- (Northern Ireland national football team) Dion Charles
- (Northern Ireland national football team) Josh Magennis
- (Northern Ireland national football team) Paddy McNair
- (Romania national football team) Daniel Bîrligea
- (Romania national football team) Florinel Coman
- (Romania national football team) Radu Drăgușin
- (Romania national football team) Valentin Mihăilă
- (Romania national football team) Alexandru Mitriță
- (Slovakia national football team) Ondrej Duda
- (Slovakia national football team) Dávid Ďuriš
- (Slovakia national football team) Dávid Hancko
- (Slovakia national football team) Lukáš Haraslín
- (Slovakia national football team) Tomáš Suslov
- (Sweden men's national football team) Yasin Ayari
- (Sweden men's national football team) Ken Sema

1 own goal

- (Armenia national football team) Georgy Arutyunyan (against Latvia)
- (Azerbaijan national football team) Rahil Mammadov (against Slovakia)
- (Bulgaria national football team) Dimitar Mitov (against Northern Ireland)
- (Latvia national football team) Kaspars Dubra (against Armenia)

== Overall ranking ==
Following the league phase, the 16 League C teams were ordered 33rd to 48th in an interim overall ranking for the 2024–25 UEFA Nations League according to the following rules:

- The teams finishing first in the groups were ranked 33rd to 36th according to the results of the league phase.
- The teams finishing second in the groups were ranked 37th to 40th according to the results of the league phase.
- The teams finishing third in the groups were ranked 41st to 44th according to the results of the league phase.
- The teams finishing fourth in the groups were ranked 45th to 48th according to the results of the league phase.

| Rnk | Grp | Team | Pld | W | D | L | GF | GA | GD | Pts |
|---|---|---|---|---|---|---|---|---|---|---|
| 33 | C2 | Romania | 6 | 6 | 0 | 0 | 18 | 3 | +15 | 18 |
| 34 | C1 | Sweden | 6 | 5 | 1 | 0 | 19 | 4 | +15 | 16 |
| 35 | C4 | North Macedonia | 6 | 5 | 1 | 0 | 10 | 1 | +9 | 16 |
| 36 | C3 | Northern Ireland | 6 | 3 | 2 | 1 | 11 | 3 | +8 | 11 |
| 37 | C1 | Slovakia | 6 | 4 | 1 | 1 | 10 | 5 | +5 | 13 |
| 38 | C2 | Kosovo | 6 | 4 | 0 | 2 | 10 | 7 | +3 | 12 |
| 39 | C3 | Bulgaria | 6 | 2 | 3 | 1 | 3 | 6 | −3 | 9 |
| 40 | C4 | Armenia | 6 | 2 | 1 | 3 | 8 | 9 | −1 | 7 |
| 41 | C3 | Belarus | 6 | 1 | 4 | 1 | 3 | 4 | −1 | 7 |
| 42 | C4 | Faroe Islands | 6 | 1 | 3 | 2 | 5 | 6 | −1 | 6 |
| 43 | C2 | Cyprus | 6 | 2 | 0 | 4 | 4 | 15 | −11 | 6 |
| 44 | C1 | Estonia | 6 | 1 | 1 | 4 | 3 | 9 | −6 | 4 |
| 45 | C4 | Latvia | 6 | 1 | 1 | 4 | 4 | 11 | −7 | 4 |
| 46 | C3 | Luxembourg | 6 | 0 | 3 | 3 | 3 | 7 | −4 | 3 |
| 47 | C1 | Azerbaijan | 6 | 0 | 1 | 5 | 3 | 17 | −14 | 1 |
| 48 | C2 | Lithuania | 6 | 0 | 0 | 6 | 4 | 11 | −7 | 0 |

Source: UEFA
Rules for classification: Ranking criteria

A final overall ranking was also compiled, though this was only used to rank teams within their new leagues for the following edition of the competition.
