= Jann Benjaminsen =

Faroese footballer (born 1994)

Personal information
- Full name: Jann Julian Benjaminsen
- Date of birth: 2 March 1997 (age 29)
- Place of birth: Tórshavn, Faroe Islands
- Position: Right-back

Team information
- Current team: NSÍ Runavík
- Number: 17

Senior career*
Years	Team	Apps	(Gls)
2016–2020	NSÍ Runavík	125	(11)
2021–2022	Hødd	49	(7)
2023–2024	B36 Tórshavn	64	(8)
2025–	NSÍ Runavík	52	(3)

International career^{‡}
2013	Faroe Islands U17	2	(0)
2017	Faroe Islands U21	2	(0)
2022–	Faroe Islands	16	(1)
- * Club domestic league appearances and goals as of 17:29, 1 November 2026 (UTC) ‡ National team caps and goals as of 20:48, 16 November 2026 (UTC)

Jann Julian Benjaminsen (born 2 March 1997) is a Faroese footballer who plays as a right-back for Faroe Islands Premier League club NSÍ Runavík and the Faroe Islands national team.

== Club career ==
Jann Benjaminsen started his senior career in NSÍ, where he was for five seasons. In 2021, he moved to Norway to play for Hødd, where he stayed for two seasons. Before the 2023 season, he moved back to the Faroese league to play for B36 Tórshavn.

== International career ==
Benjaminsen made his international debut for the Faroe Islands on 19 November 2022 in a friendly away match against Kosovo, which finished in a 1–1 draw.

== Career statistics ==
=== International ===
As of match played 16 November 2026

Appearances and goals by national team and year
National team	Year	Apps	Goals
Faroe Islands
Faroe Islands	2022	1	0
Faroe Islands	2023	0	0
Faroe Islands	2024	5	1
Faroe Islands	2025	5	0
Faroe Islands	2026	5	0
Total		16	1

Scores and results list Faroe Islands' goal tally first, score column indicates score after each Benjaminsen goal.

List of international goals scored by Jann Benjaminsen
No.	Date	Venue	Opponent	Score	Result	Competition
1	10 October 2024	Tórsvøllur, Tórshavn, Faroe Islands	Armenia	1–0	2–2	2024–25 UEFA Nations League

== Honours ==
NSÍ Runavík

- Faroe Islands Premier League: 2026
