= Ivan Bakhar =

Belarusian footballer

Ivan Bakhar Іван Бахар
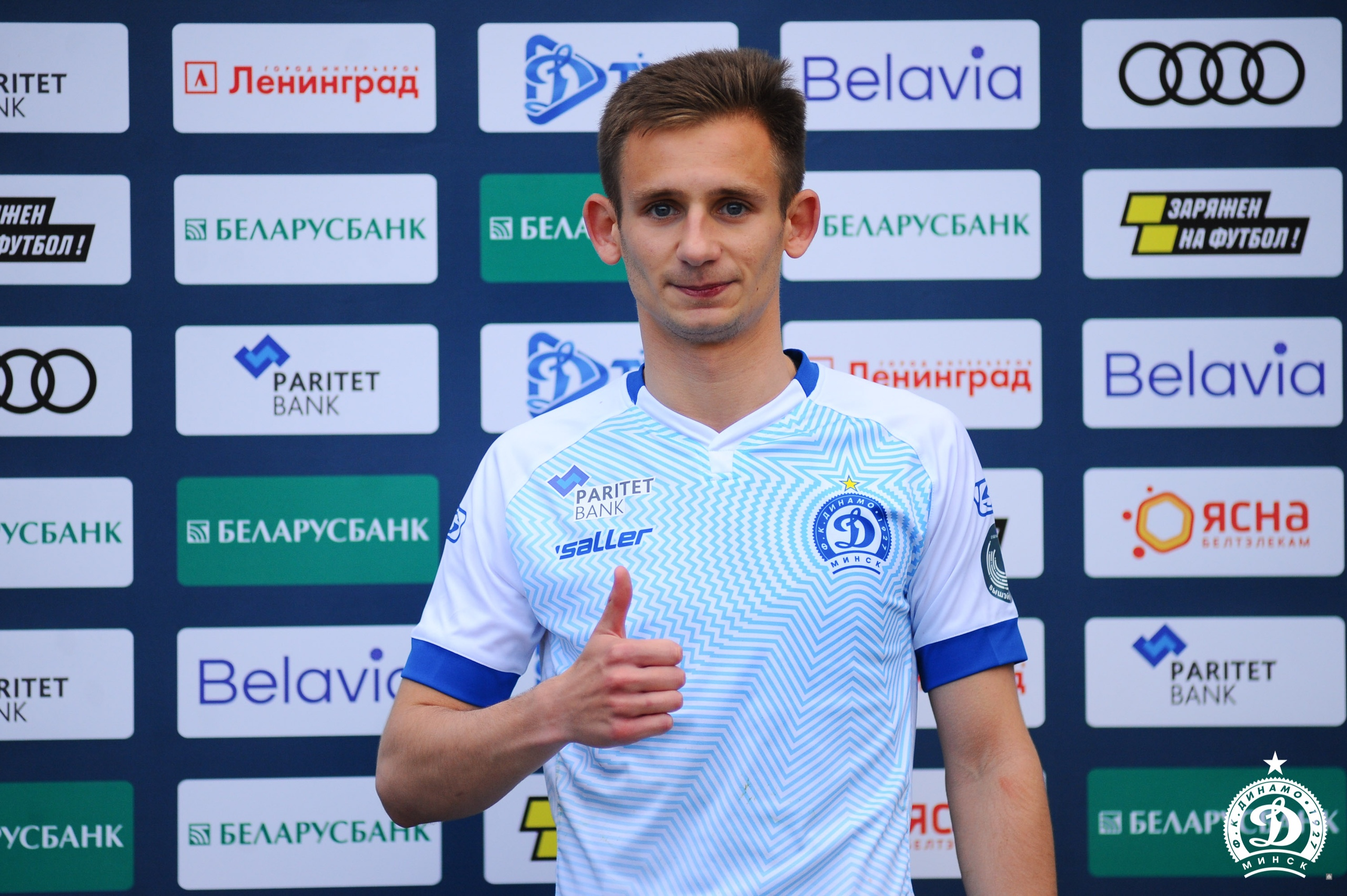

Personal information
- Date of birth: 10 July 1998 (age 28)
- Place of birth: Minsk, Belarus
- Height: 1.82 m (6 ft 0 in)
- Positions: Forward; winger

Team information
- Current team: Dinamo Minsk
- Number: 17

Youth career
- 2012–2015: Minsk

Senior career*
Years	Team	Apps	(Gls)
2014–2019	Minsk	81	(14)
2020–2022	Dinamo Minsk	77	(22)
2023	Ironi Kiryat Shmona	14	(2)
2023	Dinamo Minsk	14	(5)
2024	Arsenal Tula	10	(0)
2024–	Dinamo Minsk	26	(3)

International career^{‡}
2014–2015	Belarus U17	6	(2)
2015–2017	Belarus U19	9	(2)
2017–2019	Belarus U21	11	(6)
2019–	Belarus	30	(2)
- * Club domestic league appearances and goals as of 1 December 2025 ‡ National team caps and goals as of 8 September 2024

Ivan Bakhar (Belarusian: Іван Бахар; Russian: Иван Бахар; born 10 July 1998) is a Belarusian footballer who plays as a winger or striker for Dinamo Minsk and the Belarus national team.

== Club career ==
Bakhar signed for Ironi Kiryat Shmona F.C. in December 2022. He scored his first goal for Ironi Kiryat Shmona in a 2–2 draw against Hapoel Hadera on January 14, 2023.

== International goals ==
Scores and results list Belarus' goal tally first.

No	Date	Venue	Opponent	Score	Result	Competition
1.	11 November 2020	Ilie Oană Stadium, Ploiești, Romania	Romania	2–5	3–5	Friendly match
2.	25 September 2022	TSC Arena, Bačka Topola, Serbia	Slovakia	1–0	1–1	2022-23 Nations League
