= Kosovo national futsal team results (2020–present) =

This is a list of Kosovo national futsal team results from 2020 to 2029.

== History ==
=== 2020: Year to be forgotten ===
On 7 November 2019, in Nyon, it was decided that Kosovo should be part in Group F of the UEFA Futsal Euro 2022 qualifying, together with Austria, Georgia and Germany. On 29 January 2020, Kosovo started the qualifying cycle against Austria which they defeated with a score 4–2. One day later, Kosovo suffered the deepest defeat in its history being defeated by Germany 8–4. Two days later, Kosovo again suffers a loss from host Georgia and I end this campaign with a win and two losses making it the worst campaign Kosovo has ever had. Suddenly, on 17 March 2020, all Football Federation of Kosovo's activities were interrupted, including even futsal-related activities due to COVID-19, which led to postponement and then cancellation of gatherings and eventual matches that the national team would have in that year.

=== 2021: Year of change ===
On 29 January 2021, the Football Federation of Kosovo announced that Arben Simitçiu is the new coach of the national team, replacing the former coach Ramadan Cimili whose contract had expired. On 19 March 2021, Simitçiu made his first squad announcement with national team for the friendly matches against the Netherlands.

== Fixtures and results ==
=== 2020 ===
29 January UEFA Futsal Euro 2022 qualifying	Kosovo	4–2	Austria	Tbilisi, Georgia
13:00 (16:00 GET)	Dobroshi 9:12; Qerimi 10:43, 11:25; Topilla 10:54	Report	Dizdarević 25:06 (pen.); Jatić 34:17	Stadium: Olympic Palace; Referee: Adrian Tschopp (Switzerland) and Vitali Rakutski (Belarus)

30 January UEFA Futsal Euro 2022 qualifying	Germany	8–4	Kosovo	Tbilisi, Georgia
13:00 (16:00 GET)	Saglam 8:57, 38:43; Meyer 13:34, 35:40, 38:36; Sözer 28:51; Hoffmann 34:43; Wittig 37:22	Report	Maxharraj 0:27, 24:07; Qerimi 22:59; Kelmendi 29:17	Stadium: Olympic Palace; Referee: Vitali Rakutski (Belarus) and Josip Barton (Macedonia)

1 February UEFA Futsal Euro 2022 qualifying	Georgia	6–1	Kosovo	Tbilisi, Georgia
19:00 (22:00 GET)	Sebiskveradze 1:58, 17:30, 28:45; Saiotti 7:59; Kurtanidze 25:33; Thales 29:31	Report	Maxharraj 27:12	Stadium: Olympic Palace; Referee: Josip Barton (Macedonia) and Adrian Tschopp (Switzerland)

=== 2021 ===
5 April Friendly	Netherlands	0–0	Kosovo	Zeist, Netherlands
19:00		Report		Stadium: KNVB Campus

6 April Friendly	Netherlands	3–1	Kosovo	Zeist, Netherlands
19:00	Velseboer 2', 26'; Ceyar 29'	Report	Salihu 31'	Stadium: KNVB Campus; Attendance: 0 Referee: Jochem van Dijke (Netherlands)

25 July 2021 Continental Futsal Championship	Uzbekistan	6–3	Kosovo	Bangkok, Thailand
15:00 UTC+7	Choriev 1' (?), 38'; Rakhmatov 2'; Ropiev 22'; Erkinov 36'	Report	Salihu 6'; Dervishaj 8', 17'	Stadium: Show DC Mall

26 July 2021 Continental Futsal Championship	Kosovo	6–6	Thailand	Bangkok, Thailand
17:15 UTC+7	Salihu 4'; Mazreku 20', 23'; Rukovci 31'; Dervishaj 40' (40+?)	Report	Thueanklang 15', 36'; Musa 17'; Kaewwilai 32'; Srisubsaeng 36'; Wichian 38'	Stadium: Show DC Mall

27 July 2021 Continental Futsal Championship	Kosovo	1–2	Mozambique	Bangkok, Thailand
15:00 UTC+7	Rukovci 40'	Report	Francisco 4'; Jona 20'	Stadium: Show DC Mall

=== 2022 ===
3 March Adem Jashari Futsal Tournament	Kosovo	6–3	Albania	Pristina, Kosovo
	Maxharraj 9'; Dervishaj 13'; Kelmendi 26'; Rukovci 31', 38'; Kryeziu 32'	Report	Alibegu 6'; Maxharraj 28' (o.g.); Mejzini 40'	Stadium: Palace of Youth and Sports

8 April 2024 FIFA Futsal World Cup qualification	Bulgaria	0–2	Kosovo	Varna, Bulgaria
19:00 (18:00 EEST)		Report	Maxharraj 16:48; Salihu 26:17	Stadium: Palace of Culture and Sports; Referee: Dario Pezzuto (Italy)

9 April 2024 FIFA Futsal World Cup qualification	Kosovo	4–1	Scotland	Varna, Bulgaria
16:30 (15:30 EEST)	Maxharraj 2:41, 8:23, 35:11; Hajdini 27:04	Report	Steedman 13:25	Stadium: Palace of Culture and Sports; Referee: Georgios Kazakos (Cyprus)

11 April 2024 FIFA Futsal World Cup qualification	Kosovo	1–2	Armenia	Varna, Bulgaria
16:30 (15:30 EEST)	Kelmendi 19:20	Report	Kelmendi 1:03 (o.g.); Vitinho 7:08	Stadium: Palace of Culture and Sports

18 September 2024 FIFA Futsal World Cup qualification	Netherlands	2–1	Kosovo	Rotterdam, Netherlands
19:00	Dahmani 34:23; Ben Khalou 35:22	Report	Rukovci 39:11	Stadium: Topsportcentrum; Referee: Kirill Naishouler (Finland

7 October 2024 FIFA Futsal World Cup qualification	Ukraine	3–1	Kosovo	Salaspils, Latvia
18:00	Cherniavskyi 14:19; Korsun 23:57; Melnyk 26:24	Report	Kastrati 1:21	Stadium: Salaspils sporta nams Referee: Šarūnas Tamulynas (Lithuania)

9 November 2024 FIFA Futsal World Cup qualification	Kosovo	2–5	Ukraine	Pristina, Kosovo
17:00	Maxharraj 16:48; Salihu 33:31	Report	Cherniavskyi 5:28; Siryi 8:17; Mykytiuk 27:26; Fareniuk 30:55; Lebid 33:06	Stadium: Palace of Youth and Sports; Referee: Dejan Veselič (Slovenia)

=== 2023 ===
3 March 2024 FIFA Futsal World Cup qualification	Kosovo	3–3	Netherlands	Pristina, Kosovo
17:00	Dervishaj 8:35, 28:52; Alaj 32:17	Report	Ben Khalou 30:54; Bouyouzan 38:24; Bouzit 38:51	Stadium: Palace of Youth and Sports; Referee: Martina Piccolo (Italy)

14 April April Cup Futsal Week	Slovenia	6–1	Kosovo	Poreč, Croatia
18:15	Bukovec 10', 12'; Suban 20'; Berzelak 22'; Hozjan 28'; Totošković 35'	Report	Kaçandolli 19'	Stadium: Finda Hall

15 April April Cup Futsal Week	Montenegro	4–4 (4–1 p)	Kosovo	Poreč, Croatia
16:00	F. Kastrati 13', 32'; Mazreku 34', 36'	Report	Bulatović 3'; Lolović 17'; Puletić 36' (pen.), 38' (pen.)	Stadium: Finda Hall

== Kosovo versus other countries ==
As of 11 April 2021
Head-to-head records are included only matches as FIFA member.

Opponent	Pld	W	D	L	GF	GA	GD	Win %
Armenia	1	0	0	1	1	2	−1	0.00
Austria	1	1	0	0	4	2	+2	100.00
Bulgaria	1	1	0	0	2	0	+2	100.00
Georgia	1	0	0	1	1	6	−5	0.00
Germany	1	0	0	1	4	8	−4	0.00
Mozambique	1	0	1	0	1	2	−1	0.00
Netherlands	2	0	1	1	1	3	−2	0.00
Scotland	1	1	0	0	4	1	+3	100.00
Thailand	1	0	1	0	6	6	+0	0.00
Uzbekistan	1	0	0	1	6	3	+3	0.00
10 Countries	11	3	3	5	30	33	−3	27.27
