= Kosovo national football team results (1942–1975) =

- Win Draw Loss Void

This is a list of Kosovo national football team results from 1942 to 1975.

== History ==
=== First match ===
On 29 November 1942, Kosovo for first time in its history played a friendly match as part of the celebrations for 30th Anniversary of the Independence of Albania against Tirana, (Note: The alternative name of the Albania national team that was used during this match.) and the match ended with a 2–0 away defeat and the starting line-up of that match was Mustafa Daci, Ballanca, Ahmet Zaimi, Mazllum Xërxa, Veseli, Hajdar Hamza, Nebil Dylatahu, Ramadan Vraniqi, Dobrica Barbaroga, (Note: Dobrica Barbaroga was the Albanianized full name of Dobrica Barbarogić by the media of that time, which seems to be expression of peaceful coexistence with national minorities even in Kosovo at that time.) Bajrami and Henci.

=== 1967–1975 ===
On 8 November 1967, Kosovo for first time as autonomous province of SFR Yugoslavia played a friendly match against Yugoslavia and the match ended with a 3–3 home draw and the starting line-up of that match was a mix between Albanian and Serbian players as Milosavlević, Stevanović, Mušikić, Abrashi, S. Džukić, V. Džukić, Brovina, Hatibi, Radović, Prekazi and Pindović, for Yugoslavia this match it was a pre-preparation before the UEFA Euro 1968 qualifying match against Albania.

==== Brotherhood and Unity Tournament ====
Eight years after the match against Yugoslavia, Kosovo in 1975 participated for the first and last time in Brotherhood and Unity Tournament, which was held in Pristina and Prizren, and won in all four matches of this tournament against Montenegro (2–0), Bosnia and Herzegovina (2–1), Slovenia (2–0) and Macedonia (1–0) and also took first place.

Year	Round	Pos	Pld	W	D	L	GF	GA
(Socialist Republic of Serbia) Brotherhood and Unity Tournament	Winner	1st	4	4	0	0	7	1
Total	Best: Winner	1/1	4	4	0	0	7	1

== Fixtures and results ==
=== As Albanian Prefecture ===
29 November 1942 Friendly	Tirana	2–0	Kosovo	Tirana, Albanian Kingdom
14:30	Visha 5'; Lisi 89'	Report		Stadium: Shallvare; Attendance: 8,000; Referee: Abdurrahman Toptani (Albania)

=== As Autonomous Province of SFR Yugoslavia ===
8 November 1967 Friendly	Kosovo	3–3	Yugoslavia	Pristina, AP Kosovo, SFR Yugoslavia
14:30	Prekazi 3', 75'; Dakić 55' (o.g.)	Report	Sprečo 9'; Lazarević 18'; Osim 61'	Stadium: Pristina City Stadium; Attendance: 15,000

1975 Brotherhood and Unity Tournament	Kosovo	2–0	Montenegro	SAP Kosovo, SFR Yugoslavia (Note: Brotherhood and Unity Tournament was held in Pristina and Prizren.)
		Report

1975 Brotherhood and Unity Tournament	Kosovo	2–1	Bosnia and Herzegovina	SAP Kosovo, SFR Yugoslavia
		Report

1975 Brotherhood and Unity Tournament	Kosovo	2–0	Slovenia	SAP Kosovo, SFR Yugoslavia
		Report

1975 Brotherhood and Unity Tournament	Kosovo	1–0	Macedonia	SAP Kosovo, SFR Yugoslavia
		Report

31 July 1980 Friendly	Kosovo	2–2	Yugoslavia	Pristina, SAP Kosovo, SFR Yugoslavia
	Rajčevski 32'; Martać 71' (pen.)	Report	Janjanin 6' (pen.), 56'	Stadium: Pristina City Stadium; Attendance: 5,000; Referee: Shinasi Berisha (SAP Kosovo)

== Kosovo against their opponents ==
Opponent	Pld	W	D	L	GF	GA	GD	Win %	Ref
Yugoslavia	2	0	2	0	5	5	+0	0.00	
Bosnia and Herzegovina	1	1	0	0	2	1	+1	100.00	
Macedonia	1	1	0	0	1	0	+1	100.00	
Montenegro	1	1	0	0	2	0	+2	100.00	
Slovenia	1	1	0	0	2	0	+2	100.00	
Tirana	1	0	0	1	2	0	+2	0.00	
6 Opponents	7	4	2	1	12	8	+4	57.14	—
