= Donat Rrudhani =

Kosovan footballer

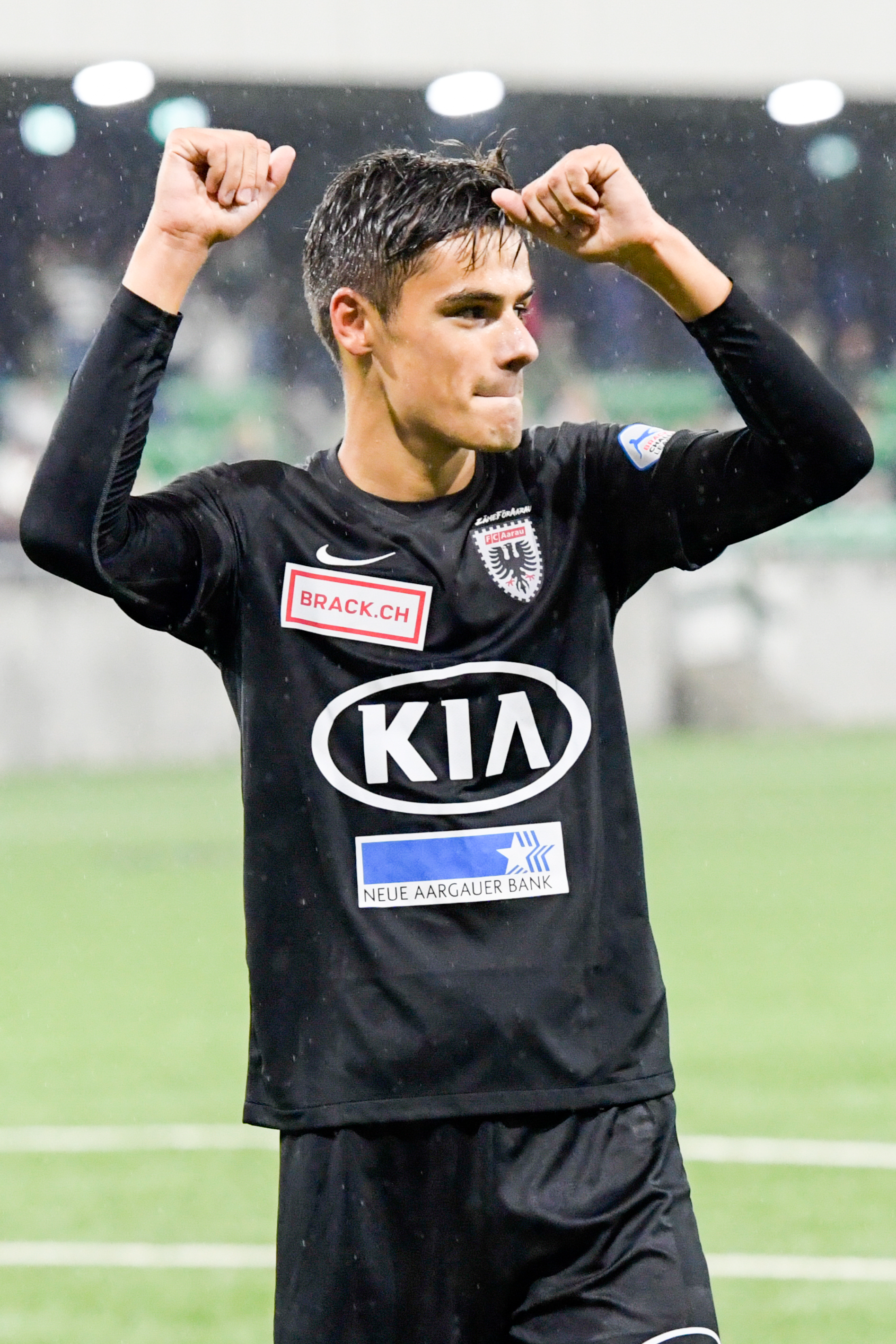
- Rrudhani with Aarau in 2020

Personal information
- Date of birth: 2 May 1999 (age 27)
- Place of birth: Kamenica, FR Yugoslavia
- Height: 1.86 m (6 ft 1 in)
- Position: Midfielder

Team information
- Current team: Sion
- Number: 77

Youth career
- CO Langres
- –2016: Troyes AC
- 2016–2017: FC Brunstatt

Senior career*
Years	Team	Apps	(Gls)
2017–2018	Timau Basel	22	(2)
2018–2019	Black Stars Basel	29	(15)
2019–2022	Aarau	103	(21)
2022–2025	Young Boys	47	(4)
2024	→ Lausanne-Sport (loan)	11	(4)
2024–2025	→ Luzern (loan)	30	(9)
2025–	Sion	29	(6)

International career^{‡}
2021–	Kosovo	19	(2)
- * Club domestic league appearances and goals as of 28 September 2026 ‡ National team caps and goals as of 9 June 2025 (UTC)

Donat Rrudhani (born 2 May 1999) is a Kosovan footballer who plays as a midfielder for Swiss Super League club Sion and the Kosovo national team.

== Club career ==
=== Early career ===
Rrudhani was born and raised in Kamenica, at the age of 12, he and his parents emigrated to France. Rrudhani after coming to France, joins CO Langres and where in addition to being part of CO Langres, he was also part of Troyes AC until 2016 and then part of FC Brunstatt. In 2017, he moved to Switzerland and started his senior career at Timau Basel and after a season transferred to Black Stars Basel.

=== Aarau ===
On 9 August 2019, Rrudhani signed a four-year contract with Swiss Challenge League club Aarau. His debut with Aarau came nine days later in the 2019–20 Swiss Cup first round against SC Cham after coming on as a substitute in the 103rd minute in place of Yvan Alounga.

=== Young Boys ===
On 8 June 2022, Rrudhani signed a four-year contract with Swiss Super League club Young Boys and this transfer would become legally effective in July 2022. On 16 July 2022, he was named as a Young Boys substitute for the first time in a league match against Zürich. His debut with Young Boys came five days later in the 2022–23 UEFA Europa Conference League second qualifying round against Liepāja after coming on as a substitute at 76th minute in place of Moumi Ngamaleu. Three days after debut, Rrudhani made his league debut in a 0–3 away win against Sion after coming on as a substitute at 76th minute in place of Christian Fassnacht. Four days later, he scored his first goal for Young Boys in his third appearance for the club in a 3–0 home win over Liepāja in 2022–23 UEFA Europa Conference League second qualifying round.

==== Loan at Lausanne-Sport ====
On 6 February 2024, Rrudhani was loaned by Lausanne-Sport until the end of the season.

==== Loan at Luzern ====
On 30 July 2024, Rrudhani moved on loan to Luzern, with an option to buy.

=== Sion ===
On 29 August 2025, he transferred to FC Sion on a four-year deal.

== International career ==
On 31 May 2021, Rrudhani received a call-up from Kosovo for the friendly matches against Guinea and Gambia. His debut with Kosovo came eight days later in a friendly match against Guinea after being named in the starting line-up.

=== International goals ===
Scores and results list Kosovo's goal tally first.

No.	Date	Venue	Opponent	Score	Result	Competition
1.	27 September 2022	Fadil Vokrri Stadium, Pristina, Kosovo	Cyprus	2–0	5–1	2022–23 UEFA Nations League C
2.	16 November 2022	Fadil Vokrri Stadium, Pristina, Kosovo	Armenia	2–2	2–2	Friendly

== Honours ==
Young Boys

- Swiss Super League: 2022–23
- Swiss Cup: 2022–23
