= Kosovo national football team results (unofficial matches) =

- Win Draw Loss Void

The Kosovo national football team has played several matches dating back to 1972, which according to various source and Football Federation of Kosovo are not counted as International "A" Matches and is reported that there were 20 such matches, most of them was played before membership in UEFA and FIFA.

== History ==
=== Pre-independence ===
==== Early years (1972) ====
Kosovo played its first known unofficial matches in December 1972 while part of the SAP Kosovo within the SFR Yugoslavia. During a short tour in PSR Albania, Kosovo faced several Albanian clubs, starting with Flamurtari Vlorë (1–1) on 13 December, followed by Tomori Berat (2–1 win) on 15 December, 17 Nëntori Tiranë (1–1) on 17 December, and Labinoti Elbasan (3–1 loss) on 20 December. These fixtures represented the earliest attempts of Kosovar footballers to compete as a separate selection.

==== 1990s ====
In the space of one year, Kosovo played two unofficial friendlies against clubs from Albania and Macedonia: Macedonian Albanian club Shkëndija on 5 February 1992, which it defeated 4–0, and Albanian club Albpetrol Patos on 16 February 1993, which it defeated 3–2, two days after the official friendly against Albania.

In November 1999, five months after the end of the Kosovo War, Kosovo played an unofficial friendly against players of Kosovar origin from the Kosovan diaspora, and the match ended in a 4–3 home win with goals from Kushtrim Munishi (twice), Kujtim Shala and Enis Fetahu.

=== 2000s ===
On 30 November 2003, Kosovo began the new decade by playing an unofficial friendly as part of the celebrations for the 91st Anniversary of the Independence of Albania against players of Albanian origin playing in Macedonia, and the match ended in a 5–0 home win with goals from Enis Fetahu (twice), Malsor Gjonbalaj, Shpëtim Hasani and Enver Jashari.

Three years later, on 28 November 2006, Kosovo played an unofficial friendly as part of the celebrations for the 94th Anniversary of the Independence of Albania against the Albanian All-Stars, and the match ended with a 3–3 draw. The starting line-up of that match was Kushtrim Mushica (GK), Ahmed Januzi, Alban Dragusha, Arben Zhjeqi, Deniz Krasniqi, Hysni Gashi, Ilir Nallbani, Kristian Nushi, Mensur Duraku, Shaqir Halili and Uliks Emra.

After the match against the Albanian All-Stars, two more games were held: a 3–0 defeat against KEK in Obiliq and a 5–1 win against Kosovo U21 in Pristina.

=== After independence ===
On 14 June 2008, Kosovo played its first unofficial friendly since the declaration of independence, again facing the Albanian All-Stars, this time losing 0–3 at home.

On 28 March 2009, Kosovo, under the alternative name Team Kosovo, played an unofficial friendly against Swedish club Malmö and suffered a 5–0 away defeat.

Following the match against Malmö, several other friendlies were held: against Kalmar (2–1 loss), Neuchâtel Xamax (2–0 win), Halmstad (4–4 draw), Renova (0–0), Wil (1–0 win), Eintracht Frankfurt (0–0 draw), and finally Werder Bremen (2–0 loss), marking the last unofficial fixtures before UEFA, and FIFA membership recognition in 2016.

== Fixtures and results ==
=== As Autonomous Province of SFR Yugoslavia ===
12 September 1972 Friendly	Kosovo	2–2	Albania U23 B	Pristina, AP Kosovo, SFR Yugoslavia
	Hadri 9' (pen.); Mërgja 74'		Dalipi 6'; Fagu 7'	Stadium: Pristina City Stadium; Referee: Milan Dutina (AP Kosovo)

13 December 1972 Friendly	Flamurtari Vlorë	1–1	Kosovo	Vlorë, PSR Albania
	Zilja 1'	Report	Hatipi 52'	Stadium: Flamurtari Stadium; Attendance: 12,000

15 December 1972 Friendly	Tomori Berat	1–2	Kosovo	Berat, PSR Albania
	Hede 15'	Report	Trifunović 31'; Hatipi 75'	Attendance: 5,000; Referee: Millan Mine (PSR Albania)

17 December 1972 Friendly	17 Nëntori Tiranë	1–1	Kosovo	Tirana, PSR Albania
	Çela	Report	Kostić	Stadium: Qemal Stafa Stadium

20 December 1972 Friendly	Labinoti Elbasan	3–1	Kosovo	Elbasan, PSR Albania
	Duçka 4'; Gogu 38' (pen.); Hysi 44'	Report	Shuica 24'	Stadium: Labinot Stadium; Attendance: 10,000; Referee: Hydaid Pupo (PSR Albania)

18 August 1978 Friendly	Albania U18	1–1	Kosovo	Tirana, PSR Albania
	Lika 78'		Berisha 50'	Stadium: Dinamo Stadium; Referee: Lulëzim Konçi (PSR Albania)

20 August 1978 Friendly	Tomori Berat	0–2	Kosovo	Berat, PSR Albania
			Hoxha (?)	Referee: Shenasi Berisha (AP Kosovo)

24 August 1978 Friendly	Besa Kavajë	0–0	Kosovo	Kavajë, PSR Albania
				Stadium: Besa Stadium

=== 1992–2007 ===
5 February 1992 Friendly	Shkëndija	0–4	Kosovo	Tetovo, Macedonia
				Stadium: Tetovo City Stadium; Attendance: 7,000; Referee: Shinasi Berisha (Kosovo)

16 February 1993 Friendly	Albpetrol Patos	2–3	Kosovo	Patos, Albania
	Hasa 12'; Belba 60'		Aliu 17'; Sahiti 55'; Ejupi 62'	Stadium: Alush Noga Stadium; Attendance: 4,000; Referee: Zeqir Kongjini (Albania)

19 December 1999 Friendly	Kosovo	4–3	Kosovan Diaspora	Mitrovica, Kosovo under UN administration
	K. Munishi 5', 16'; Shala 34' (pen.); Fetahu 82'	Report	I. Munishi 17', 22'; Kelmendi 80'	Stadium: Adem Jashari Olympic Stadium

30 November 2003 Friendly	Kosovo	5–0	Macedonian Albanians	Pristina, Kosovo under UN administration
	Fetahu (?); Gjonbalaj (?); Hasani (?); Jashari (?)	Report		Stadium: Pristina City Stadium

29 November 2005 Friendly	Rosenborg	Canceled	Kosovo	Trondheim, Norway

28 November 2006 Friendly	Kosovo	3–3	Albanian All-Stars	Pristina, Kosovo under UN administration
	Januzi 30'; Nallbani 41'; Hyseni 84'	Report	Kasapi 6'; Kuqi 28'; Curri 90'	Stadium: Pristina City Stadium; Attendance: 10,000; Referee: Përparim Hasani (Kosovo)

15 March 2007 Friendly	KEK	3–0	Kosovo	Obilić, Kosovo under UN administration
	Bajrami 16'; Muja 30'; Kodraliu 35'	Report		Stadium: Agron Rama Stadium; Attendance: 1,500; Referee: Përparim Hasani (Kosovo)

6 June 2007 Friendly	Kosovo	5–1	Kosovo U21	Pristina, Kosovo under UN administration
	Hashani 16'; Iseni 37'; Ramushi 71', 82', 90'	Report	Hyseni 19'	Stadium: Xhemail Ibishi Stadium; Attendance: 150; Referee: Përparim Hasani (Kosovo)

=== 2008–2015 ===
14 June 2008 Friendly	Kosovo	0–3	Albanian All-Stars	Pristina, Kosovo
		Report	Kuqi 24', 83'; Kastrati 45'	Stadium: Pristina City Stadium; Attendance: 4,000; Referee: Përparim Hasani (Kosovo)

28 March 2009 Friendly	Malmö	5–0	Kosovo	Malmö, Sweden
13:00	Larsson 23'; Ofere 36', 72'; Harbuzi 84'; Kruys 87'	Report		Stadium: Malmö Stadion; Attendance: 3,000

26 June 2009 Friendly	Kalmar	2–1	Kosovo	Kalmar, Sweden
	Mendes 20'; Marcelo 75'	Report	Gashi 7'	Stadium: Fredriksskans

9 October 2010 Friendly	Neuchâtel Xamax	0–2	Kosovo	Neuchâtel, Switzerland
		Report	Rama 59'; Kukaj 72'	Stadium: Stade de la Maladière; Attendance: 4,000

10 June 2010 Friendly	Halmstad	4–4	Kosovo	Halmstad, Sweden
	Anselmo 23'; Miller 48'; Salomonsson 82', 86'	Report	Rama 4'; Gashi 35'; Bektashi 39'; Bala 71'	Stadium: Örjans Vall; Attendance: 2,000; Referee: Mattias Nyman (Sweden)

27 March 2011 Friendly	Kosovo	0–0	Renova	Pristina, Kosovo
		Report		Stadium: Pristina City Stadium; Attendance: 3,000; Referee: Përparim Hasani (Kosovo)

14 October 2014 Friendly	Wil	0–1	Kosovo	Wil, Switzerland
		Report	Lushtaku 77'	Stadium: IGP Arena

24 March 2015 Friendly	Eintracht Frankfurt	0–0	Kosovo	Frankfurt, Germany
19:00		Report		Stadium: Stadion am Bornheimer Hang; Attendance: 4,000

27 March 2015 Friendly	Werder Bremen	2–0	Kosovo	Braunschweig, Germany
18:30	Ayçiçek 27'; Makiadi 88'	Report		Stadium: Eintracht-Stadion; Attendance: 5,000

== Head-to-head record ==
Opponent	Pld	W	D	L	GF	GA	GD	Win %
(People's Socialist Republic of Albania) 17 Nëntori Tiranë	1	0	1	0	1	1	+0	0.00
Albanian All-Stars	2	0	1	1	3	6	−3	0.00
(Albania) Albpetrol Patos	1	1	0	0	3	2	+1	100.00
(Germany) Eintracht Frankfurt	1	0	1	0	0	0	+0	0.00
(People's Socialist Republic of Albania) Flamurtari Vlorë	1	0	1	0	1	1	+0	0.00
(Sweden) Halmstad	1	0	1	0	4	4	+0	0.00
(Sweden) Kalmar	1	0	0	1	1	2	−1	0.00
(Kosovo) KEK	1	0	0	1	0	5	−5	0.00
Kosovan Diaspora	1	1	0	0	4	3	+1	100.00
Kosovo U21	1	1	0	0	5	1	+4	100.00
(People's Socialist Republic of Albania) Labinoti Elbasan	1	0	0	1	1	3	−2	0.00
Macedonian Albanians	1	1	0	0	5	0	+5	100.00
(Sweden) Malmö	1	0	0	1	0	5	−5	0.00
(Switzerland) Neuchâtel Xamax	1	1	0	0	2	0	+2	100.00
(North Macedonia) Renova	1	0	1	0	0	0	+0	0.00
(North Macedonia) Shkëndija	1	1	0	0	4	0	+4	100.00
(People's Socialist Republic of Albania) Tomori Berat	1	1	0	0	2	1	+1	100.00
(Germany) Werder Bremen	1	0	0	1	0	2	−2	0.00
(Switzerland) Wil	1	1	0	0	1	0	+1	100.00
19 Teams	20	8	6	6	37	37	+0	40.00

== Notes and references ==
=== Notes ===
1. Kosovo during the 2009–10 period was introduced with its alternative name as Ekipi i Kosovës (Team Kosovo), in order to avoid possible sanctions by UEFA and FIFA against Kosovo and the opponents that Kosovo played. After Kosovo was allowed on 6 February 2013 by FIFA to play against FIFA member associations in international friendlies, this alternative name was no longer used.
