= 2022–23 UEFA Nations League C =

Tournament details
- Dates: League phase: 2 June – 27 September 2022; Relegation play-outs: 21–26 March 2024
- Teams: 16
- Promoted: Georgia; Greece; Kazakhstan; Turkey
- Relegated: Gibraltar

Tournament statistics
- Matches played: 50
- Goals scored: 129 (2.58 per match)
- Attendance: 502,787 (10,056 per match)
- Top scorer(s): (Georgia (country)) Khvicha Kvaratskhelia (Kosovo) Vedat Muriqi (5 goals each)

The 2022–23 UEFA Nations League C was the third division of the 2022–23 edition of the UEFA Nations League, the third season of the international football competition involving the men's national teams of the 55 member associations of UEFA.

== Format ==
League C consisted of 16 UEFA members ranked from 33–48 in the 2022–23 UEFA Nations League access list, split into four groups of four. Each team played six matches within their group, using the home-and-away round-robin format in June (quadruple matchdays) and September 2022 (double matchdays). The winners of each group were promoted to the 2024–25 UEFA Nations League B, and the two worst-ranked fourth-placed teams of each group advanced to the relegation play-outs.

As League C had four groups while League D had only two, the League C team that was to be relegated to the 2024–25 UEFA Nations League D was determined by play-outs in March 2024.

Originally, all four of the fourth-placed teams would have participated in the play-outs. Based on the Nations League overall ranking, the best-ranked team would have faced the fourth-ranked team, and the second-ranked team would have faced the third-ranked team. The two losing teams would have been relegated to League D, while the winners would have remained in League C.

However, due to the ongoing suspension of Russia from all UEFA competitions and to ensure that League C would still consist of 16 teams, the league allocation for the 2024–25 UEFA Nations League was changed so that only one team would be relegated to League D. Based on the Nations League overall ranking, the two lowest-ranked teams participated in the play-outs, while the other two fourth-placed teams remained in League C.

The play-out tie was played over two legs, with the higher-ranked team hosting the second leg. The team that scored more goals on aggregate over the two legs remained in League C while the loser was relegated to League D. If the aggregate score was level, extra time was played without applying the away goals rule. If still tied after extra time, a penalty shoot-out was used to decide the winner.

== Teams ==
=== Team changes ===
The following were the team changes in League C from the 2020–21 season:

Incoming
Relegated from Nations League B	Promoted from Nations League D
Bulgaria; Northern Ireland; Slovakia; Turkey	Gibraltar; Faroe Islands

Outgoing
Promoted to Nations League B	Relegated to Nations League D
Albania; Armenia; Montenegro; Slovenia	Estonia; Moldova

=== Seeding ===
In the 2022–23 access list, UEFA ranked teams based on the 2020–21 Nations League overall ranking. The seeding pots for the league phase were confirmed on 22 September 2021, and were based on the access list ranking.

Pot 1
Team	Rank
Turkey	33
Slovakia	34
Bulgaria	35
Northern Ireland	36

Pot 2
Team	Rank
Greece	37
Belarus	38
Luxembourg	39
North Macedonia	40

Pot 3
Team	Rank
Lithuania	41
Georgia	42
Azerbaijan	43
Kosovo	44

Pot 4
Team	Rank
Kazakhstan (Note: The identity of the play-out winners was not known at the time of the draw.)	45
Cyprus	46
Gibraltar	47
Faroe Islands	48

The draw for the league phase took place at the UEFA headquarters in Nyon, Switzerland on 16 December 2021, 18:00 CET. Each group contained one team from each pot. Due to restrictions of excessive travel, each group could contain a maximum of one of the following pairs: Northern Ireland and the winner of the Moldova v Kazakhstan play-out tie, Gibraltar and Azerbaijan.

== Groups ==
The fixture list was confirmed by UEFA on 17 December 2021, the day following the draw.

Times are CEST (UTC+2), as listed by UEFA (local times, if different, are in parentheses).

=== Group 1 ===
Pos	Team	Pld	W	D	L	GF	GA	GD	Pts	Promotion or qualification	(Turkey)	(Luxembourg)	(Faroe Islands)	(Lithuania)
1	Turkey (P)	6	4	1	1	18	5	+13	13	Promotion to League B	—	3–3	4–0	2–0
2	Luxembourg	6	3	2	1	9	7	+2	11		0–2	—	2–2	1–0
3	Faroe Islands	6	2	2	2	7	10	−3	8		2–1	0–1	—	2–1
4	Lithuania (O)	6	0	1	5	2	14	−12	1	Qualification for relegation play-outs	0–6	0–2	1–1	—

Source: UEFA
Rules for classification: Tiebreakers
(O) Play-off winners; (P) Promoted
4 June 2022
18:00 (19:00 UTC+3)

Lithuania	0–2	Luxembourg
	Report	Sinani 44', 78'

LFF Stadium, Vilnius
Attendance: 3,009
Referee: David Fuxman (Israel)
4 June 2022
20:45 (21:45 UTC+3)

Turkey	4–0	Faroe Islands
Ünder 37'; Dervişoğlu 47'; Dursun 82'; Demiral 85'	Report

Başakşehir Fatih Terim Stadium, Istanbul
Attendance: 9,515
Referee: Trustin Farrugia Cann (Malta)

7 June 2022
20:45 (19:45 UTC+1)

Faroe Islands	0–1	Luxembourg
	Report	Rodrigues 74' (pen.)

Tórsvøllur, Tórshavn
Attendance: 2,313
Referee: Rob Hennessy (Republic of Ireland)
7 June 2022
20:45 (21:45 UTC+3)

Lithuania	0–6	Turkey
	Report	Sinik 2', 14'; Dursun 56' (pen.), 81'; Akgün 89'; Dervişoğlu 90+1'

LFF Stadium, Vilnius
Attendance: 2,843
Referee: Novak Simović (Serbia)

11 June 2022
18:00 (17:00 UTC+1)

Faroe Islands	2–1	Lithuania
Davidsen 20' (pen.); Andreasen 45'	Report	Černych 6'

Tórsvøllur, Tórshavn
Attendance: 2,278
Referee: Igor Pajac (Croatia)
11 June 2022
20:45

Luxembourg	0–2	Turkey
	Report	Çalhanoğlu 37' (pen.); Dursun 76'

Stade de Luxembourg, Luxembourg
Attendance: 9,374
Referee: António Nobre (Portugal)

14 June 2022
20:45

Luxembourg	2–2	Faroe Islands
Rodrigues 12' (pen.); Barreiro 49'	Report	Bjartalíð 57', 59'

Stade de Luxembourg, Luxembourg
Attendance: 5,325
Referee: Michael Fabbri (Italy)
14 June 2022
20:45 (21:45 UTC+3)

Turkey	2–0	Lithuania
Ayhan 37'; Çalhanoğlu 54' (pen.)	Report

Gürsel Aksel Stadium, İzmir
Attendance: 14,694
Referee: Stéphanie Frappart (France)

22 September 2022
20:45 (21:45 UTC+3)

Lithuania	1–1	Faroe Islands
Slivka 41'	Report	Andreasen 22'

LFF Stadium, Vilnius
Attendance: 2,376
Referee: Vilhjálmur Alvar Þórarinsson (Iceland)
22 September 2022
20:45 (21:45 UTC+3)

Turkey	3–3	Luxembourg
Ünder 16' (pen.); Chanot 39' (o.g.); Yüksek 87'	Report	Da Graça 8'; Sinani 37'; Rodrigues 69'

Başakşehir Fatih Terim Stadium, Istanbul
Attendance: 12,708
Referee: Tobias Stieler (Germany)

25 September 2022
20:45 (19:45 UTC+1)

Faroe Islands	2–1	Turkey
Davidsen 51'; Edmundsson 59'	Report	Gürler 89'

Tórsvøllur, Tórshavn
Attendance: 2,056
Referee: Serhiy Boyko (Ukraine)
25 September 2022
20:45

Luxembourg	1–0	Lithuania
Rodrigues 89'	Report

Stade de Luxembourg, Luxembourg
Attendance: 5,340
Referee: Giorgi Kruashvili (Georgia)

=== Group 2 ===
Pos	Team	Pld	W	D	L	GF	GA	GD	Pts	Promotion	(Greece)	(Kosovo)	(Northern Ireland)	(Cyprus)
1	Greece (P)	6	5	0	1	10	2	+8	15	Promotion to League B	—	2–0	3–1	3–0
2	Kosovo	6	3	0	3	11	8	+3	9		0–1	—	3–2	5–1
3	Northern Ireland	6	1	2	3	7	10	−3	5 (Note: Tied on head-to-head results. Overall goal difference was used as the tiebreaker.)		0–1	2–1	—	2–2
4	Cyprus	6	1	2	3	4	12	−8	5	Spared from relegation play-outs	1–0	0–2	0–0	—

Source: UEFA
Rules for classification: Tiebreakers
(P) Promoted
Notes:
2 June 2022
18:00 (19:00 UTC+3)

Cyprus	0–2	Kosovo
	Report	Berisha 65'; Zhegrova 78'

AEK Arena – Georgios Karapatakis, Larnaca
Attendance: 1,550
Referee: Jérôme Brisard (France)
2 June 2022
20:45 (19:45 UTC+1)

Northern Ireland	0–1	Greece
	Report	Bakasetas 39'

Windsor Park, Belfast
Attendance: 16,977
Referee: Erik Lambrechts (Belgium)

5 June 2022
18:00 (19:00 UTC+3)

Cyprus	0–0	Northern Ireland
	Report

AEK Arena – Georgios Karapatakis, Larnaca
Attendance: 1,663
Referee: Enea Jorgji (Albania)
5 June 2022
20:45

Kosovo	0–1	Greece
	Report	Bakasetas 36'

Fadil Vokrri Stadium, Pristina
Attendance: 12,300
Referee: John Beaton (Scotland)

9 June 2022
20:45 (21:45 UTC+3)

Greece	3–0	Cyprus
Bakasetas 8'; Pavlidis 20'; Limnios 48'	Report

Panthessaliko Stadium, Volos
Attendance: 12,418
Referee: Tamás Bognár (Hungary)
9 June 2022
20:45

Kosovo	3–2	Northern Ireland
Muriqi 9' (pen.), 52'; Bytyqi 19'	Report	Lavery 44'; Ballard 83'

Fadil Vokrri Stadium, Pristina
Attendance: 11,700
Referee: Jakob Kehlet (Denmark)

12 June 2022
15:00 (14:00 UTC+1)

Northern Ireland	2–2	Cyprus
McNair 71'; J. Evans 90+4'	Report	Kakoullis 32', 51'

Windsor Park, Belfast
Attendance: 16,454
Referee: Ricardo de Burgos Bengoetxea (Spain)
12 June 2022
20:45 (21:45 UTC+3)

Greece	2–0	Kosovo
Giakoumakis 71'; Mantalos 90+8'	Report

Panthessaliko Stadium, Volos
Attendance: 15,367
Referee: Julian Weinberger (Austria)

24 September 2022
18:00 (17:00 UTC+1)

Northern Ireland	2–1	Kosovo
Whyte 82'; Magennis 90+3'	Report	Muriqi 58'

Windsor Park, Belfast
Attendance: 17,148
Referee: Glenn Nyberg (Sweden)
24 September 2022
20:45 (21:45 UTC+3)

Cyprus	1–0	Greece
Tzionis 18'	Report

AEK Arena – Georgios Karapatakis, Larnaca
Attendance: 4,548
Referee: Aleksei Kulbakov (Belarus)

27 September 2022
20:45 (21:45 UTC+3)

Greece	3–1	Northern Ireland
Pelkas 14'; Masouras 55'; Mantalos 80'	Report	Lavery 18'

Georgios Kamaras Stadium, Athens
Attendance: 5,871
Referee: Filip Glova (Slovakia)
27 September 2022
20:45

Kosovo	5–1	Cyprus
Muslija 22'; Rrudhani 45+1'; Rashani 47'; Muriqi 52', 84'	Report	Roberge 81'

Fadil Vokrri Stadium, Pristina
Attendance: 10,400
Referee: Kristo Tohver (Estonia)

=== Group 3 ===
Pos	Team	Pld	W	D	L	GF	GA	GD	Pts	Promotion	(Kazakhstan)	(Azerbaijan)	(Slovakia)	(Belarus)
1	Kazakhstan (P)	6	4	1	1	8	6	+2	13	Promotion to League B	—	2–0	2–1	2–1
2	Azerbaijan	6	3	1	2	7	4	+3	10		3–0	—	0–1	2–0
3	Slovakia	6	2	1	3	5	6	−1	7		0–1	1–2	—	1–1
4	Belarus	6	0	3	3	3	7	−4	3	Spared from relegation play-outs	1–1	0–0	0–1	—

Source: UEFA
Rules for classification: Tiebreakers
(P) Promoted
3 June 2022
16:00 (20:00 UTC+6)

Kazakhstan	2–0	Azerbaijan
Aymbetov 50', 60'	Report

Astana Arena, Nur-Sultan
Attendance: 19,823
Referee: István Vad (Hungary)
3 June 2022
20:45

Belarus	0–1	Slovakia
	Report	Suslov 61'

Karađorđe Stadium, Novi Sad (Serbia) (Note: Due to the country's involvement in the Russian invasion of Ukraine, Belarus were required to play their home matches at neutral venues and behind closed doors until further notice.)
Attendance: 0
Referee: Stéphanie Frappart (France)

6 June 2022
20:45

Belarus	0–0	Azerbaijan
	Report

Karađorđe Stadium, Novi Sad (Serbia)
Attendance: 0
Referee: Mohammed Al-Hakim (Sweden)
6 June 2022
20:45

Slovakia	0–1	Kazakhstan
	Report	Darabayev 26'

Anton Malatinský Stadium, Trnava
Attendance: 4,146
Referee: Kristo Tohver (Estonia)

10 June 2022
18:00 (20:00 UTC+4)

Azerbaijan	0–1	Slovakia
	Report	Weiss 81'

Dalga Arena, Baku
Attendance: 2,967
Referee: Donatas Rumšas (Lithuania)
10 June 2022
20:45

Belarus	1–1	Kazakhstan
Malkevich 84'	Report	Aymbetov 13'

Karađorđe Stadium, Novi Sad (Serbia)
Attendance: 0
Referee: Manuel Schüttengruber (Austria)

13 June 2022
16:00 (20:00 UTC+6)

Kazakhstan	2–1	Slovakia
Vorogovsky 18'; Astanov 39'	Report	Bero 51'

Astana Arena, Nur-Sultan
Attendance: 28,745
Referee: Bram Van Driessche (Belgium)
13 June 2022
18:00 (20:00 UTC+4)

Azerbaijan	2–0	Belarus
Emreli 76'; Sheydayev 90+3'	Report

Dalga Arena, Baku
Attendance: 2,330
Referee: Anastasios Papapetrou (Greece)

22 September 2022
16:00 (20:00 UTC+6)

Kazakhstan	2–1	Belarus
Gabyshev 29'; Zaynutdinov 79'	Report	Savitsky 45+3'

Astana Arena, Astana
Attendance: 29,637
Referee: Horatiu Fesnic (Romania)
22 September 2022
20:45

Slovakia	1–2	Azerbaijan
Jirka 90+3' (pen.)	Report	Dadashov 44'; Haghverdi 90+5'

Anton Malatinský Stadium, Trnava
Attendance: 2,875
Referee: Willie Collum (Scotland)

25 September 2022
18:00 (20:00 UTC+4)

Azerbaijan	3–0	Kazakhstan
Marochkin 66' (o.g.); Ozobić 74'; Nuriyev 90+1'	Report

Dalga Arena, Baku
Attendance: 2,950
Referee: Harm Osmers (Germany)
25 September 2022
18:00

Slovakia	1–1	Belarus
Zreľák 65'	Report	Bakhar 45'

TSC Arena, Bačka Topola (Serbia) (Note: Due to the country's involvement in the Russian invasion of Ukraine, Belarus were not allowed to enter Slovakia by local authorities. As a result, the match was played at a neutral venue.)
Attendance: 524
Referee: Nikola Dabanović (Montenegro)

=== Group 4 ===
Pos	Team	Pld	W	D	L	GF	GA	GD	Pts	Promotion or qualification	(Georgia (country))	(Bulgaria)	(North Macedonia)	(Gibraltar)
1	Georgia (P)	6	5	1	0	16	3	+13	16	Promotion to League B	—	0–0	2–0	4–0
2	Bulgaria	6	2	3	1	10	8	+2	9		2–5	—	1–1	5–1
3	North Macedonia	6	2	1	3	7	7	0	7		0–3	0–1	—	4–0
4	Gibraltar (R)	6	0	1	5	3	18	−15	1	Qualification for relegation play-outs	1–2	1–1	0–2	—

Source: UEFA
Rules for classification: Tiebreakers
(P) Promoted; (R) Relegated
2 June 2022
18:00 (20:00 UTC+4)

Georgia	4–0	Gibraltar
Kvaratskhelia 12'; Kashia 33'; Mikautadze 87'; Qazaishvili 88'	Report

Boris Paichadze Dinamo Arena, Tbilisi
Attendance: 43,412
Referee: Morten Krøgh (Denmark)
2 June 2022
20:45 (21:45 UTC+3)

Bulgaria	1–1	North Macedonia
Despodov 13'	Report	M. Ristovski 50'

Huvepharma Arena, Razgrad
Attendance: 8,275
Referee: Jérémie Pignard (France)

5 June 2022
18:00

Gibraltar	0–2	North Macedonia
	Report	Bardhi 21'; Nikolov 84'

Victoria Stadium, Gibraltar
Attendance: 703
Referee: Alain Durieux (Luxembourg)
5 June 2022
20:45 (21:45 UTC+3)

Bulgaria	2–5	Georgia
A. Iliev 50'; Stefanov 83'	Report	Davitashvili 4'; A. Hristov 31' (o.g.); Zivzivadze 52'; Kvaratskhelia 58' (pen.); Qazaishvili 69'

Huvepharma Arena, Razgrad
Attendance: 3,600
Referee: Fabio Maresca (Italy)

9 June 2022
20:45

Gibraltar	1–1	Bulgaria
Walker 61' (pen.)	Report	G. Minchev 45+1'

Victoria Stadium, Gibraltar
Attendance: 1,427
Referee: Petri Viljanen (Finland)
9 June 2022
20:45

North Macedonia	0–3	Georgia
	Report	Zivzivadze 52'; Kvaratskhelia 62'; Kiteishvili 84'

Toše Proeski Arena, Skopje
Attendance: 10,775
Referee: Roi Reinshreiber (Israel)

12 June 2022
18:00 (20:00 UTC+4)

Georgia	0–0	Bulgaria
	Report

Boris Paichadze Dinamo Arena, Tbilisi
Attendance: 54,200
Referee: Espen Eskås (Norway)
12 June 2022
18:00

North Macedonia	4–0	Gibraltar
Bardhi 4'; Torrilla 14' (o.g.); Miovski 16'; Churlinov 31'	Report

Toše Proeski Arena, Skopje
Attendance: 4,750
Referee: Dumitri Muntean (Moldova)

23 September 2022
18:00 (20:00 UTC+4)

Georgia	2–0	North Macedonia
Miovski 35' (o.g.); Kvaratskhelia 64'	Report

Boris Paichadze Dinamo Arena, Tbilisi
Attendance: 54,200
Referee: Ivan Kružliak (Slovakia)
23 September 2022
20:45 (21:45 UTC+3)

Bulgaria	5–1	Gibraltar
Antov 23'; Despodov 36'; Kirilov 52'; Stefanov 55'; Petkov 81'	Report	R. Chipolina 26'

Huvepharma Arena, Razgrad
Attendance: 1,540
Referee: Pavel Orel (Czech Republic)

26 September 2022
20:45

Gibraltar	1–2	Georgia
Annesley 75'	Report	Kvaratskhelia 19' (pen.); Tsitaishvili 48'

Victoria Stadium, Gibraltar
Attendance: 1,199
Referee: Rob Harvey (Republic of Ireland)
26 September 2022
20:45

North Macedonia	0–1	Bulgaria
	Report	Despodov 50'

Toše Proeski Arena, Skopje
Attendance: 20,173
Referee: Julian Weinberger (Austria)

== Ranking of fourth-placed teams ==
Pos	Grp	Team	Pld	W	D	L	GF	GA	GD	Pts	Qualification
1	C2	Cyprus	6	1	2	3	4	12	−8	5	Spared from relegation play-outs
2	C3	Belarus	6	0	3	3	3	7	−4	3	Spared from relegation play-outs
3	C1	Lithuania (O)	6	0	1	5	2	14	−12	1	Qualification for relegation play-outs
4	C4	Gibraltar (R)	6	0	1	5	3	18	−15	1	Qualification for relegation play-outs

Source: UEFA
Rules for classification: Ranking criteria
(O) Play-off winners; (R) Relegated

== Relegation play-outs ==
The two worst-ranked fourth-placed teams of League C participated in the relegation play-outs to determine the team which would be relegated to League D. The relegation play-outs were scheduled on the same dates as the UEFA Euro 2024 qualifying play-offs. If at least one of the teams due to participate in the relegation play-outs had also qualified for the Euro qualifying play-offs, the relegation play-outs would have been cancelled, and the worst-ranked team in League C in the Nations League overall ranking would have been automatically relegated. However, this scenario did not occur, and the relegation play-outs progressed as scheduled.

The play-out tie was as follows, with the higher-ranked team hosting the second leg:

Times are CET (UTC+1), as listed by UEFA (local times, if different, are in parentheses).

=== Summary ===
Team 1	Agg.	Team 2	1st leg	2nd leg
Gibraltar	0–2	Lithuania	0–1	0–1

=== Matches ===
21 March 2024
20:45 (19:45 UTC+0)

Gibraltar	0–1	Lithuania
	Report	Kučys 60'

Estádio Algarve, Faro/Loulé (Portugal) (Note: Gibraltar played their home match at Estádio Algarve, Faro/Loulé, Portugal, due to the redevelopment of their regular stadium, Victoria Stadium, Gibraltar.)
Attendance: 207
Referee: Giorgi Kruashvili (Georgia)
26 March 2024
18:00 (19:00 UTC+2)

Lithuania	1–0	Gibraltar
Černych 51'	Report

Darius and Girėnas Stadium, Kaunas
Attendance: 6,102
Referee: Duje Strukan (Croatia)

Lithuania won 2–0 on aggregate and remained in League C, while Gibraltar were relegated to League D.

== Goalscorers ==
There were 129 goals scored in 50 matches, for an average of 2.58 goals per match.

5 goals

- (Georgia national football team) Khvicha Kvaratskhelia
- (Kosovo national football team) Vedat Muriqi

4 goals

- (Luxembourg national football team) Gerson Rodrigues
- (Turkey national football team) Serdar Dursun

3 goals

- (Bulgaria national football team) Kiril Despodov
- (Greece national football team) Anastasios Bakasetas
- (Kazakhstan national football team) Abat Aymbetov
- (Luxembourg national football team) Danel Sinani

2 goals

- (Bulgaria national football team) Iliyan Stefanov
- (Cyprus national football team) Andronikos Kakoullis
- (Faroe Islands national football team) Jákup Andreasen
- (Faroe Islands national football team) Jóannes Bjartalíð
- (Faroe Islands national football team) Viljormur Davidsen
- (Georgia national football team) Valeri Qazaishvili
- (Georgia national football team) Budu Zivzivadze
- (Greece national football team) Petros Mantalos
- (Lithuania national football team) Fedor Černych
- (North Macedonia national football team) Enis Bardhi
- (Northern Ireland national football team) Shayne Lavery
- (Turkey national football team) Hakan Çalhanoğlu
- (Turkey national football team) Halil Dervişoğlu
- (Turkey national football team) Doğukan Sinik
- (Turkey national football team) Cengiz Ünder

1 goal

- (Azerbaijan national football team) Renat Dadashov
- (Azerbaijan national football team) Mahir Emreli
- (Azerbaijan national football team) Hojjat Haghverdi
- (Azerbaijan national football team) Anatoliy Nuriyev
- (Azerbaijan national football team) Filip Ozobić
- (Azerbaijan national football team) Ramil Sheydayev
- (Belarus national football team) Ivan Bakhar
- (Belarus national football team) Vladislav Malkevich
- (Belarus national football team) Pavel Savitsky
- (Bulgaria national football team) Valentin Antov
- (Bulgaria national football team) Atanas Iliev
- (Bulgaria national football team) Radoslav Kirilov
- (Bulgaria national football team) Georgi Minchev
- (Bulgaria national football team) Marin Petkov
- (Cyprus national football team) Valentin Roberge
- (Cyprus national football team) Marinos Tzionis
- (Faroe Islands national football team) Jóan Símun Edmundsson
- (Georgia national football team) Zuriko Davitashvili
- (Georgia national football team) Guram Kashia
- (Georgia national football team) Otar Kiteishvili
- (Georgia national football team) Georges Mikautadze
- (Georgia national football team) Giorgi Tsitaishvili
- (Gibraltar national football team) Louie Annesley
- (Gibraltar national football team) Roy Chipolina
- (Gibraltar national football team) Liam Walker
- (Greece national football team) Giorgos Giakoumakis
- (Greece national football team) Dimitrios Limnios
- (Greece national football team) Georgios Masouras
- (Greece national football team) Vangelis Pavlidis
- (Greece national football team) Dimitrios Pelkas
- (Kazakhstan national football team) Elkhan Astanov
- (Kazakhstan national football team) Aslan Darabayev
- (Kazakhstan national football team) Mikhail Gabyshev
- (Kazakhstan national football team) Yan Vorogovsky
- (Kazakhstan national football team) Bakhtiyar Zaynutdinov
- (Kosovo national football team) Valon Berisha
- (Kosovo national football team) Zymer Bytyqi
- (Kosovo national football team) Florent Muslija
- (Kosovo national football team) Elbasan Rashani
- (Kosovo national football team) Donat Rrudhani
- (Kosovo national football team) Edon Zhegrova
- (Lithuania national football team) Armandas Kučys
- (Lithuania national football team) Vykintas Slivka
- (Luxembourg national football team) Leandro Barreiro
- (Luxembourg national football team) Marvin da Graça
- (North Macedonia national football team) Darko Churlinov
- (North Macedonia national football team) Bojan Miovski
- (North Macedonia national football team) Boban Nikolov
- (North Macedonia national football team) Milan Ristovski
- (Northern Ireland national football team) Daniel Ballard
- (Northern Ireland national football team) Jonny Evans
- (Northern Ireland national football team) Josh Magennis
- (Northern Ireland national football team) Paddy McNair
- (Northern Ireland national football team) Gavin Whyte
- (Slovakia national football team) Matúš Bero
- (Slovakia national football team) Erik Jirka
- (Slovakia national football team) Tomáš Suslov
- (Slovakia national football team) Vladimír Weiss
- (Slovakia national football team) Adam Zreľák
- (Turkey national football team) Yunus Akgün
- (Turkey national football team) Kaan Ayhan
- (Turkey national football team) Merih Demiral
- (Turkey national football team) Serdar Gürler
- (Turkey national football team) İsmail Yüksek

1 own goal

- (Bulgaria national football team) Andrea Hristov (against Georgia)
- (Gibraltar national football team) Graeme Torrilla (against North Macedonia)
- (Kazakhstan national football team) Aleksandr Marochkin (against Azerbaijan)
- (Luxembourg national football team) Maxime Chanot (against Turkey)
- (North Macedonia national football team) Bojan Miovski (against Georgia)

== Overall ranking ==
The 16 League C teams were ranked 33rd to 48th overall in the 2022–23 UEFA Nations League according to the following rules:

- The teams finishing first in the groups were ranked 33rd to 36th according to the results of the league phase.
- The teams finishing second in the groups were ranked 37th to 40th according to the results of the league phase.
- The teams finishing third in the groups were ranked 41st to 44th according to the results of the league phase.
- The teams finishing fourth in the groups were ranked 45th to 48th according to the results of the league phase.

Rnk	Grp	Team	Pld	W	D	L	GF	GA	GD	Pts
33	C4	Georgia	6	5	1	0	16	3	+13	16
34	C2	Greece	6	5	0	1	10	2	+8	15
35	C1	Turkey	6	4	1	1	18	5	+13	13
36	C3	Kazakhstan	6	4	1	1	8	6	+2	13
37	C1	Luxembourg	6	3	2	1	9	7	+2	11
38	C3	Azerbaijan	6	3	1	2	7	4	+3	10
39	C2	Kosovo	6	3	0	3	11	8	+3	9
40	C4	Bulgaria	6	2	3	1	10	8	+2	9
41	C1	Faroe Islands	6	2	2	2	7	10	−3	8
42	C4	North Macedonia	6	2	1	3	7	7	0	7
43	C3	Slovakia	6	2	1	3	5	6	−1	7
44	C2	Northern Ireland	6	1	2	3	7	10	−3	5
45	C2	Cyprus	6	1	2	3	4	12	−8	5
46	C3	Belarus	6	0	3	3	3	7	−4	3
47	C1	Lithuania	6	0	1	5	2	14	−12	1
48	C4	Gibraltar	6	0	1	5	3	18	−15	1

Source: UEFA
Rules for classification: Ranking criteria

== Euro 2024 qualifying play-offs ==
The four best teams in League C according to the overall ranking that did not qualify for UEFA Euro 2024 through the qualifying group stage competed in the play-offs, with the winners qualifying for the final tournament.

League C
Rank	Team
33 ^{GW}	Georgia
34 ^{GW}	Greece
35 ^{GW}	Turkey
36 ^{GW}	Kazakhstan
37	Luxembourg
38	Azerbaijan
39	Kosovo
40	Bulgaria
41	Faroe Islands
42	North Macedonia
43	Slovakia
44	Northern Ireland
45	Cyprus
46	Belarus
47	Lithuania
48	Gibraltar

Key

- ^{GW} Group winner from Nations League C
- Team qualified directly to final tournament
- Team in **bold** advanced to play-offs
