= Dan Ballard =

Dan or Daniel Ballard may refer to:

- Dan Ballard (fl. 2000s–2020s), American musician with the band Until June
- Dan Ballard (footballer) (born 1999), Northern Irish footballer
