= Edgars Gauračs =

Latvian footballer

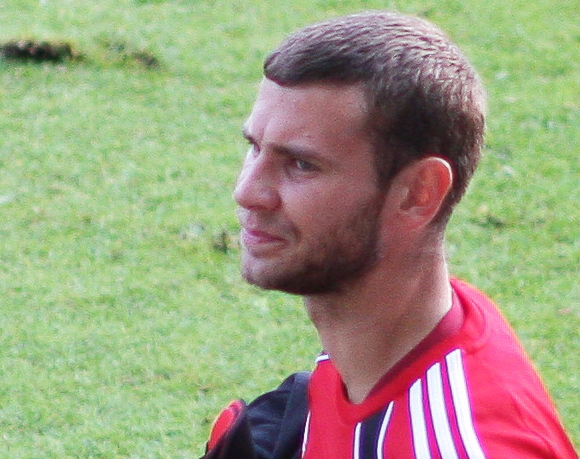
- Gauračs in training

Personal information
- Full name: Edgars Gauračs
- Date of birth: 10 March 1988 (age 38)
- Place of birth: Rēzekne, Republic of Latvia)
- Height: 1.88 m (6 ft 2 in)
- Position: Striker

Team information
- Current team: Spartaks Jūrmala (general director)

Youth career
- –2004: Blāzma

Senior career*
Years	Team	Apps	(Gls)
2004–2006	Blāzma	65	(22)
2006–2009	Ascoli	0	(0)
2009	→ Rodengo Saiano (loan)	2	(0)
2009–2010	Ventspils	7	(0)
2010	→ Rapid București (loan)	6	(0)
2010–2011	Sheriff Tiraspol	12	(11)
2011–2012	Yenisey Krasnoyarsk	33	(5)
2012–2014	Torpedo Moscow	36	(4)
2014–2019	Spartaks Jūrmala	82	(34)
2014–2015	→ FC Aarau (loan)	2	(1)
2016	→ Liepāja (loan)	12	(4)
Total		257	(81)

International career
2007–2010	Latvia U21	12	(10)
2011–2018	Latvia	22	(5)
- * Club domestic league appearances and goals

Edgars Gauračs (born 10 March 1988) is a retired Latvian footballer who played as a striker.

== Club career ==
=== Ascoli ===
Until summer 2006 he played for Blāzma Rēzekne, but after training in Italy with teams like Milan, Sampdoria and Lazio, he signed with Ascoli. He was released from the Italian club in 2009.

=== Ventspils ===
FK Ventspils signed him before the UEFA Europa League matches in 2009. He appeared for FK Ventspils in the 2009–10 UEFA Europa League group stages. He scored a goal against Hertha BSC in the first match 1–1 draw. During the winter transfer period in 2009 after several great performances many clubs from Romania and Greece showed their interest in signing him during the winter transfer window.

Gauračs finally signed a contract with FC Rapid București in Romania and he joined the club on loan from Ventspils until the end of the season. The club's owner, George Copos, confidently announced that the player had a bright future ahead of him at his new club, where he would have stayed for 4 more years if Rapid had activated its option for a permanent deal in the summer. Rapid paid 50,000 € for the loan. Edgars made his debut for Rapid on 28 February 2010 in a league match against Unirea Urziceni, coming on as a substitute. Unfortunately, Edgars had to fight with his injuries all season long, appearing only in six team matches without scoring a single goal. In June 2010 he returned to FK Ventspils but was released in July.

=== Sheriff Tiraspol ===
In August 2010, after treating his injuries, he went on trial with FC Sheriff Tiraspol from Moldova. This trial was successful and he signed a contract with the team on 25 August 2010, making himself available to play in the UEFA Europa League.

Gauračs scored a hat-trick for Sheriff in his first match at the club in a 4–0 victory over FC Sfîntul Gheorghe. He also appeared in the 2–0 victory over FC Dynamo Kyiv in the UEFA Europa League second match. All in all he played five matches out of six in the Europa League, starting one match in the first eleven. He scored five goals in a 7–0 league victory over FC Dinamo Bender on 18 December 2010. All in all he played 12 matches in the national championship of Moldova, scoring 11 goals. After the first half of the season he decided to quit the contract, searching for a higher level championship.

=== Yenisey Krasnoyarsk ===
In February 2011 Gauračs went on trial with Russian National Football League club FC Yenisey Krasnoyarsk and signed a contract with them in March 2011. He became a first eleven player right after joining and during the season played 33 matches, scoring 5 goals for the team. Yenisey finished the season in the tenth position.

=== Torpedo Moscow ===
On 15 June 2012 Gauračs signed a two-year contract with another Russian National Football League club Torpedo Moscow. The player himself stated that Torpedo's ambitions to earn a promotion to the Russian Premier League and the relatively close distance to Latvia had made the decision for him. In his first season with Torpedo, Gauračs scored three goals in 21 appearances, while the second season saw him score 1 goal in 15 matches. At the end of 2013 in a special nomination Gauračs was named the most stylish footballer of the Russian National Football League.

=== Spartaks Jūrmala ===
Having lost a place in the squad of the national team, Gauračs made a decision to return to the Latvian Higher League, signing a contract with Spartaks Jūrmala at the end of February 2014. His move was at a great extent influenced by Spartaks' that time manager Fabio Micarelli. Gauračs immediately made an influence, scoring in five consecutive matches. His run of form earned him two Latvian Higher League Player of the Month awards, in June and July respectively. His first league goal, a top corner strike from a free kick against Skonto Rīga, was later voted as the goal of the season with Gauračs receiving an award in the Latvian Football Federation annual awards ceremony. Afterwards, this goal was also voted by supporters as Goal of the Year in the Baltics. All in all, Gauračs scored 14 goals in 16 league matches, becoming the fourth top scorer of the championship, having played there for only half a season till July 2014.

=== Aarau ===
On 16 July 2014 Gauračs was given out on a year-long loan to the Swiss Super League club FC Aarau. On his debut Gauračs scored the only goal in a 1–0 league victory over FC Sion. In only his second match for the club on 28 July 2014 against BSC Young Boys Gauračs suffered a cruciate ligament rupture and was ruled out of football for more than half a year.

=== Retirement ===
In November 2019 it was confirmed, that 31-year old Gauračs would retire. However, he would continue in his position as a general director at Spartaks Jūrmala, which he was appointed back in May 2017 alongside his football career.

In October 2021, Gauračs was sanctioned with a ten year ban for match-fixing by UEFA’s Control, Ethics and Disciplinary Body. He was sanctioned under Article 12.2(a)(d) and (e) of UEFA’s Disciplinary Regulations.

== International career ==
From 2007 till 2010, Gauračs played for Latvia U-21. He scored 10 goals in 12 games and is still the all-time top scorer for the U-21 side. Gauračs made his senior debut for Latvia in the EURO 2012 qualification match against Israel on 4 June 2011, coming on as a substitute. Gauračs helped Latvia win the 2012 Baltic Cup, scoring 3 goals in 2 matches and becoming the top scorer of the tournament.

== International goals ==
#	Date	Venue	Opponent	Score	Result	Competition
1.	1 June 2012	Võru Stadium, Võru, Estonia	Lithuania	2–0	5–0	2012 Baltic Cup
2.	1 June 2012	Võru Stadium, Võru, Estonia	Lithuania	4–0	5–0	2012 Baltic Cup
3.	3 June 2012	Võru Stadium, Võru, Estonia	Finland	1–1	1–1	2012 Baltic Cup
4.	16 October 2012	Skonto Stadium, Riga, Latvia	Liechtenstein	2–0	2–0	2014 FIFA World Cup qualification
5.	28 May 2013	Schauinsland-Reisen-Arena, Duisburg, Germany	Turkey	1–2	3–3	Friendly

== Other information ==
Gauračs is famous for his unusual goal scored in the Moldovan National Division match against FC Olimpia on 7 November 2010, coming from the back of the goalkeeper and stealing the ball from the unlucky Serghei Paşcenco, while he was preparing to make a long distance kick after saving a penalty.

== Personal life ==
Gauračs is married to Jūlija Gaurača and has a son Enriko, born in 2008. Gauračs has several tattoos across his body that represent important events of his personal life. He is locally famous for his stylish image and similarities in looks with the former English football superstar David Beckham. Gauračs speaks six languages – Latvian, English, Russian, Polish, Romanian and Italian. His all-time favourite football player is Andriy Shevchenko. Gauračs is an active user of Twitter and Instagram.
