= List of international goals scored by Teemu Pukki =

List of Teemu Pukki goals

Teemu Pukki is a Finnish professional football player, who is the all-time leading goalscorer of the Finland national football team. In total, Pukki scored 43 goals in 133 international appearances between his senior national team debut on 4 February 2009 and his final match on 17 November 2025.

Pukki scored ten goals in ten appearances during the UEFA Euro 2020 qualifying campaign, helping Finland to qualify for the postponed Euro 2020 final tournament, for the first time in the nation's history.

Pukki surpassed Jari Litmanen as Finland's top goalscorer on 12 October 2021, by scoring a brace in a 2–0 away win against Kazakhstan in the 2022 FIFA World Cup qualifiers, with his 32nd and 33rd international goals.

In November 2025, Pukki announced that he would end his international career with the national team after the match against Andorra on 17 November. He scored his last international goal in his last international match.

== International goals ==
Scores and results list Finland's goal tally first, score column indicates score after each Pukki goal.

Table key
Indicates Finland won the match
Indicates the match ended in a draw
Indicates Finland lost the match

List of international goals scored by Teemu Pukki
No.	Date	Venue	Cap	Opponent	Score	Result	Competition
1	26 May 2012	Red Bull Arena, Wals-Siezenheim, Austria	11	Turkey	2–2	3–2	Friendly
2	15 August 2012	Windsor Park, Belfast, Northern Ireland	14	Northern Ireland	2–2	3–3	Friendly
3	11 September 2012	Na Stínadlech, Teplice, Czech Republic	16	Czech Republic	1–0	1–0	Friendly
4	14 November 2012	GSP Stadium, Nicosia, Cyprus	18	Cyprus	1–0	3–0	Friendly
5	22 March 2013	El Molinón, Gijón, Spain	20	Spain	1–1	1–1	2014 FIFA World Cup qualification
6	11 June 2013	Central Stadium, Gomel, Belarus	23	Belarus	1–0	1–1	2014 FIFA World Cup qualification
7	21 May 2014	Olympic Stadium, Helsinki, Finland	30	Czech Republic	1–0	2–2	Friendly
8	21 May 2014	Olympic Stadium, Helsinki, Finland	30	Czech Republic	2–1	2–2	Friendly
9	6 October 2016	Laugardalsvöllur, Reykjavík, Iceland	52	Iceland	1–0	2–3	2018 FIFA World Cup qualification
10	5 September 2017	Loro Boriçi Stadium, Shkodër, Albania	59	Kosovo	1–0	1–0	2018 FIFA World Cup qualification
11	26 March 2018	Gloria Golf Resort Pitch A, Belek, Turkey	64	Malta	1–0	5–0	Friendly
12	26 March 2018	Gloria Golf Resort Pitch A, Belek, Turkey	64	Malta	3–0	5–0	Friendly
13	8 September 2018	Ratina Stadium, Tampere, Finland	65	Hungary	1–0	1–0	2018–19 UEFA Nations League C
14	11 September 2018	Veritas Stadion, Turku, Finland	66	Estonia	1–0	1–0	2018–19 UEFA Nations League C
15	13 October 2018	A. Le Coq Arena, Tallinn, Estonia	67	Estonia	1–0	1–0	2018–19 UEFA Nations League C
16	8 June 2019	Ratina Stadium, Tampere, Finland	73	Bosnia and Herzegovina	1–0	2–0	UEFA Euro 2020 qualification
17	8 June 2019	Ratina Stadium, Tampere, Finland	73	Bosnia and Herzegovina	2–0	2–0	UEFA Euro 2020 qualification
18	11 June 2019	Rheinpark Stadion, Vaduz, Liechtenstein	74	Liechtenstein	1–0	2–0	UEFA Euro 2020 qualification
19	5 September 2019	Ratina Stadium, Tampere, Finland	75	Greece	1–0	1–0	UEFA Euro 2020 qualification
20	8 September 2019	Ratina Stadium, Tampere, Finland	76	Italy	1–1	1–2	UEFA Euro 2020 qualification
21	15 October 2019	Veritas Stadion, Turku, Finland	78	Armenia	2–0	3–0	UEFA Euro 2020 qualification
22	15 October 2019	Veritas Stadion, Turku, Finland	78	Armenia	3–0	3–0	UEFA Euro 2020 qualification
23	15 November 2019	Telia 5G -areena, Helsinki, Finland	79	Liechtenstein	2–0	3–0	UEFA Euro 2020 qualification
24	15 November 2019	Telia 5G -areena, Helsinki, Finland	79	Liechtenstein	3–0	3–0	UEFA Euro 2020 qualification
25	18 November 2019	Olympic Stadium, Athens, Greece	80	Greece	1–0	1–2	UEFA Euro 2020 qualification
26	15 November 2020	Vasil Levski National Stadium, Sofia, Bulgaria	86	Bulgaria	1–0	2–1	2020–21 UEFA Nations League B
27	18 November 2020	Cardiff City Stadium, Cardiff, Wales	87	Wales	1–2	1–3	2020–21 UEFA Nations League B
28	24 March 2021	Olympic Stadium, Helsinki, Finland	88	Bosnia and Herzegovina	1–1	2–2	2022 FIFA World Cup qualification
29	24 March 2021	Olympic Stadium, Helsinki, Finland	88	Bosnia and Herzegovina	2–1	2–2	2022 FIFA World Cup qualification
30	28 March 2021	Olimpiyskiy National Sports Complex, Kyiv, Ukraine	89	Ukraine	1–1	1–1	2022 FIFA World Cup qualification
31	9 October 2021	Olympic Stadium, Helsinki, Finland	97	Ukraine	1–1	1–2	2022 FIFA World Cup qualification
32	12 October 2021	Astana Arena, Nur-Sultan, Kazakhstan	98	Kazakhstan	1–0	2–0	2022 FIFA World Cup qualification
33	12 October 2021	Astana Arena, Nur-Sultan, Kazakhstan	98	Kazakhstan	2–0	2–0	2022 FIFA World Cup qualification
34	26 March 2022	Estadio Nueva Condomina, Murcia, Spain	101	Iceland	1–0	1–1	Friendly
35	4 June 2022	Olympic Stadium, Helsinki, Finland	103	Bosnia and Herzegovina	1–0	1–1	2022–23 UEFA Nations League B
36	14 June 2022	Bilino Polje Stadium, Zenica, Bosnia and Herzegovina	106	Bosnia and Herzegovina	1–1	2–3	2022–23 UEFA Nations League B
37	23 September 2022	Olympic Stadium, Helsinki, Finland	107	Romania	1–0	1–1	2022–23 UEFA Nations League B
38	19 June 2023	Olympic Stadium, Helsinki, Finland	112	San Marino	6–0	6–0	UEFA Euro 2024 qualification
39	17 November 2023	Olympic Stadium, Helsinki, Finland	117	Northern Ireland	3–0	4–0	UEFA Euro 2024 qualification
40	21 March 2024	Cardiff City Stadium, Cardiff, Wales	119	Wales	1–2	1–4	UEFA Euro 2024 qualification
41	4 June 2024	Estádio José Alvalade, Lisbon, Portugal	121	Portugal	1–3	2–4	Friendly
42	4 June 2024	Estádio José Alvalade, Lisbon, Portugal	121	Portugal	2–3	2–4	Friendly
43	17 November 2025	Tammelan Stadion, Tampere, Finland	133	Andorra	2–0	4–0	Friendly

== Statistics ==
Appearances and goals by year
Year	Competitive		Friendly		Total	
Year	Apps	Goals	Apps	Goals	Apps	Goals
2009	0	0	1	0	1	0
2010	0	0	2	0	2	0
2011	4 (Note: Appearances in UEFA Euro 2012 qualifying)	0	2	0	6	0
2012	4 (Note: Two appearances in 2014 FIFA World Cup qualification, two appearances in 2012 Baltic Cup)	0	5	4	9	4
2013	6 (Note: Appearances in 2014 FIFA World Cup qualification)	2	4	0	10	2
2014	6 (Note: Appearances in UEFA Euro 2016 qualifying)	0	3	2	9	2
2015	5	0	2	0	7	0
2016	4 (Note: Appearances in 2018 FIFA World Cup qualification)	1	6	0	10	1
2017	5	1	3	0	8	1
2018	6 (Note: Appearances in 2018–19 UEFA Nations League C)	3	2	2	8	5
2019	10 (Note: Appearances in UEFA Euro 2020 qualifying)	10	0	0	10	10
2020	6 (Note: Appearances in 2020–21 UEFA Nations League B)	2	1	0	7	2
2021	11 (Note: Eight appearances and six goals in 2022 FIFA World Cup qualification, three appearances in UEFA Euro 2020)	6	2	0	13	6
2022	6 (Note: Appearances in 2022–23 UEFA Nations League B)	3	2	1	8	4
2023	10 (Note: Appearances in UEFA Euro 2024 qualifying)	2	0	0	10	2
2024	6 (Note: One appearance and one goal in UEFA Euro 2024 qualifying, five appearances in 2024–25 UEFA Nations League B)	1	3	2	9	3
2025	4 (Note: Appearances in 2026 FIFA World Cup qualification)	0	2	1	6	1
Total	93	31	40	12	133	43

Notes

Goals by competition
Competition	Goals
UEFA European Championship qualifiers	13
Friendlies	12
FIFA World Cup qualifiers	10
UEFA Nations League	8
Total	43

Goals by opponent
Opponent	Goals
Bosnia and Herzegovina	6
Czech Republic	3
Liechtenstein	3
Armenia	2
Estonia	2
Greece	2
Iceland	2
Kazakhstan	2
Malta	2
Northern Ireland	2
Portugal	2
Ukraine	2
Wales	2
Andorra	1
Belarus	1
Bulgaria	1
Cyprus	1
Hungary	1
Italy	1
Kosovo	1
Romania	1
San Marino	1
Spain	1
Turkey	1
Total	43
