= Teemu Pukki =

Finnish footballer (born 1990)

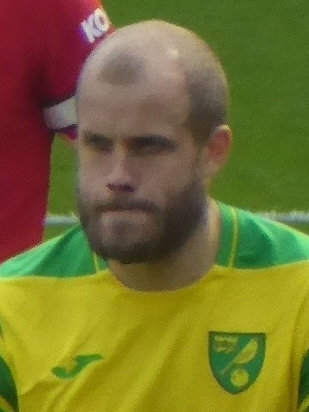
- Pukki with Norwich City in 2022

Personal information
- Full name: Teemu Eino Antero Pukki
- Date of birth: 29 March 1990 (age 36)
- Place of birth: Kotka, Finland
- Height: 1.80 m (5 ft 11 in)
- Position: Striker

Youth career
- 1997–2000: KoNa
- 2000–2005: KTP

Senior career*
Years	Team	Apps	(Gls)
2006–2008	KTP	29	(3)
2008–2009	Sevilla Atlético	33	(3)
2008–2009	Sevilla	1	(0)
2010–2011	HJK	25	(13)
2011–2013	Schalke 04	37	(8)
2013–2015	Celtic	26	(7)
2014–2015	→ Brøndby (loan)	27	(9)
2015–2018	Brøndby	103	(46)
2018–2023	Norwich City	198	(87)
2023–2024	Minnesota United	35	(14)
2025–2026	HJK	58	(20)

International career
2005	Finland U15	4	(4)
2006	Finland U16	13	(7)
2006–2007	Finland U17	12	(5)
2007–2008	Finland U18	18	(5)
2009	Finland U19	3	(2)
2007–2011	Finland U21	23	(6)
2009–2025	Finland	133	(43)
Medal record
Representing Finland
Second place	Baltic Cup	2012 Estonia
Third place	Baltic Cup	2014 Latvia
- * Club domestic league appearances and goals as of 12 November 2026

Teemu Eino Antero Pukki (born 29 March 1990) is a former Finnish professional footballer who last played as a striker for Veikkausliiga club HJK.

Pukki began his career with KTP and made his debut on senior level on 23 June 2005 at the age of 15 in a fifth round match of the Finnish Cup. He then moved to Sevilla in 2008, where he played only one La Liga game for the first team before returning to Finland with HJK. In HJK he won the Veikkausliiga championship and the Finnish Cup. He then played in the top divisions of Germany for Schalke 04, Scotland for Celtic and Denmark for Brøndby. In 2018, he signed for Norwich City on a free transfer, and was named Player of the Season in the 2018–19 EFL Championship.

Pukki made his international debut for Finland in 2009. He went on to earn over 130 caps and score 43 goals, making him the all-time leading male Finnish goalscorer. Pukki scored ten goals in ten matches in Finland's UEFA Euro 2020 qualification campaign, helping the side reach their first ever major international tournament.

== Club career ==
=== KTP ===
Pukki began his football career in childhood in HOPS (Hovinsaaren Palloseura) while living in Hovinsaari, Kotka. As a youth he joined his official hometown club, KTP, playing for their under-19 side. He made his debut for the first team at 16 years old and his performances saw him called up to play for Finland's youth international sides. In two seasons of first-team football, Pukki made 29 appearances in the Finnish Premier League (Veikkausliiga) and scored three goals.

=== Sevilla ===
Pukki moved to Sevilla from KTP for a transfer fee of €180,000. He was called up for the Sevilla first team for the away match against Real Madrid on 7 December 2008, but was an unused substitute. He received his La Liga debut at home against Racing on 25 January 2009. He found himself unused in Sevilla playing mostly for the reserve side Sevilla Atlético and he decided to return to Finland.

=== HJK ===
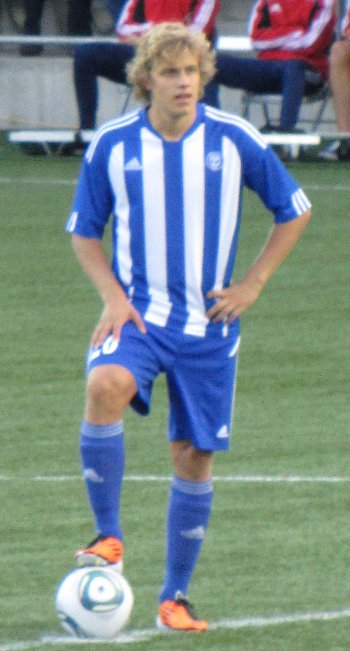
Pukki playing for HJK in 2011

On 28 August 2010, Pukki signed a three-and-a-half-year contract with the Finnish Veikkausliiga club HJK. Pukki made his debut 30 August a match against IFK Mariehamn. He managed to score his first goal for HJK in the next match against FF Jaro which was his first goal in a league match for nearly two years. During season 2010 he managed to play in seven games and score two goals for HJK in the 2010 season. At the end of the season HJK and Pukki won the Finnish Veikkausliiga and silver in the Finnish Cup.

During season 2011 he scored 11 goals and notched eight assists in 18 league matches out of which he was in the starting line up in 13. He was chosen to 2011 Veikkausliiga All Stars -team. Pukki was also a key figure in HJK's UEFA Champions League and UEFA Europa League qualifications. He scored two goals against Bangor City and HJK's both goals in a 2–0 home win against FC Schalke 04. Pukki also scored HJK's only goal in the 6–1 away defeat against Schalke.

=== Schalke 04 ===
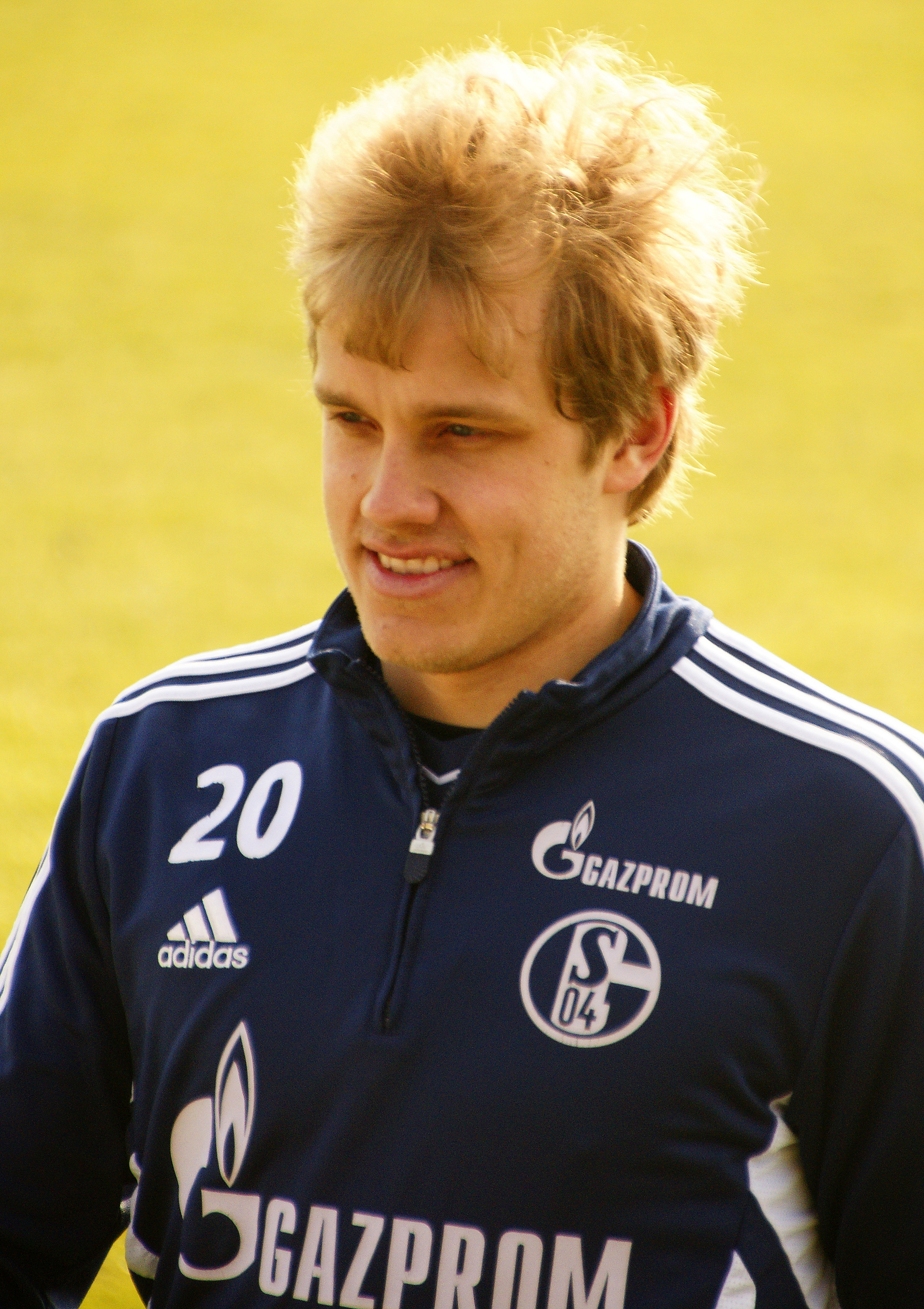
Pukki with Schalke 04 in 2013

On 31 August 2011, Pukki joined Schalke on a three-year contract, for a fee of €1.8 million. He made his debut on 18 September, when he came in as a substitute for Klaas-Jan Huntelaar on 66th minute in a 0–2 defeat against Bayern Munich. On 6 November, he scored two goals for Schalke as he debuted in the starting 11 against Hannover 96. By doing so, he became the third Finn to score a brace in the German Bundesliga, after Ari Hjelm and Pasi Rautiainen.

=== Celtic ===
On 31 August 2013, Pukki signed a four-year deal with Celtic from FC Schalke 04 for an undisclosed fee, reported to be £3 million. He scored on his debut in a 3–1 win against Hearts on 14 September 2013 and again on his home debut against St Johnstone on 21 September. On 26 January 2014 he scored against Hibernian. Overall though, Pukki's first season at Celtic was considered something of a disappointment as he struggled with form and failed to fill the void left by Gary Hooper who had left at the start of the season. Pukki himself later acknowledged the lack of impact he had made, admitting he initially felt playing in Scotland would be "easier" than in Germany. He found the speed and physical nature of the game in Scotland difficult to adjust to, and stated "Scottish football is not easy. It's not a bad league at all".

On 8 July 2014, Pukki scored his first Celtic hat trick in a pre-season friendly against LASK Linz in a 5–2 victory for Celtic. Pukki scored twice in Celtic's victory against KR Reykjavik at Murrayfield Stadium in Celtic's UEFA Champions League qualifying match, the match ended 4–0 with Celtic winning 5–0 on aggregate. However, he struggled to make any impact in the next qualifying round matches against Legia Warsaw and was substituted at half-time in the league defeat to Inverness Caledonian Thistle on 6 August 2014.

=== Brøndby ===
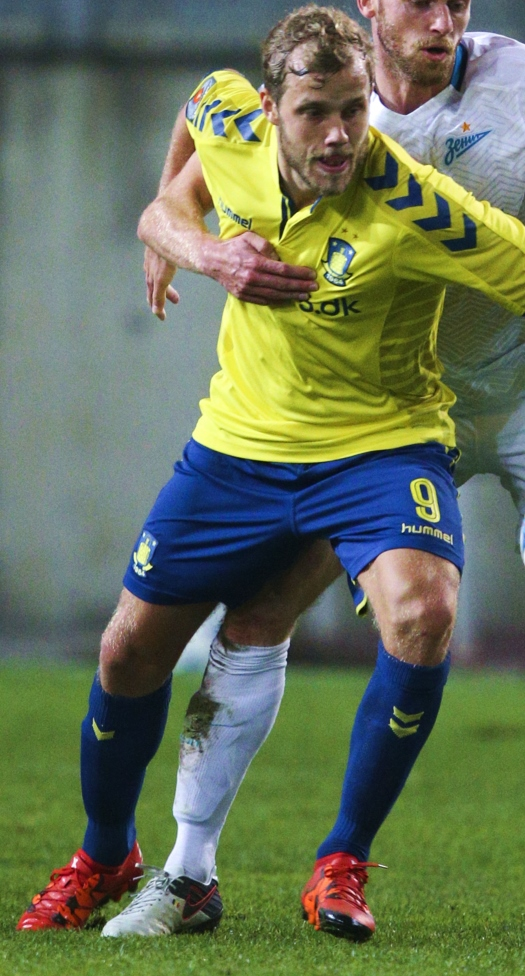
Pukki playing for Brøndby in 2016

On 1 September 2014, Pukki signed a one-year loan deal with option to buy with Danish side Brøndby IF. He made his debut 13 days later in a league match at home against Randers and scored his first goal two weeks later in a 2–2 draw away against Esbjerg. He went on to score another four goals in his next four games, and was rewarded for his form by being voted the Superliga Player of the Month for October, finishing the season as the club's top scorer, with nine goals. On 19 June 2015, Pukki signed a three-year contract with Brøndby for an undisclosed fee. According to media, the transfer fee was between £600,000 and £1 million. On 4 August 2016, Pukki scored three goals when Brøndby knocked out Hertha BSC in the third round of the 2016–17 UEFA Europa League qualifiers, winning 3–1, thereby overcoming a 0–1 deficit from the first leg in Berlin.

On 13 July 2017, he scored one goal against VPS in the first leg of the second qualifying round for the 2017–18 UEFA Europa League, Brøndby would go on to win the match 2–0. On 10 May 2018 he played as Brøndby beat Silkeborg IF 3–1 in the 2017–18 Danish Cup final.

He was released at the end of the 2017–18 season after failing to agree a new deal with the club.

=== Norwich City ===
==== 2018–19 season ====
On 30 June 2018, Pukki joined EFL Championship club Norwich City on a free transfer, signing a three-year deal. He made his debut on 4 August, playing the full 90 minutes of a 2–2 draw at Birmingham City, and a week later he scored his first goal in a 4–3 home loss to West Bromwich Albion.

From January to February 2019, Pukki scored eight goals across six consecutive matches, ending with two goals in a 4–0 win at Bolton Wanderers. This run included two goals on 10 February in a 3–0 win over Ipswich Town in the East Anglian Derby, with which he became the Finn with the most goals in a Championship season, overtaking former Ipswich player Shefki Kuqi's 20 in 2004–05.

In April 2019, Pukki was named EFL Championship Player of the Season and was included in the 2018–19 Championship Team of the Season. He was also named Norwich City F.C. Player of the Season by Norwich City's supporters for 2018–19 and received the Barry Butler Memorial Trophy. He was also named the PFA Fans' Player of the Year.

==== 2019–20 season ====
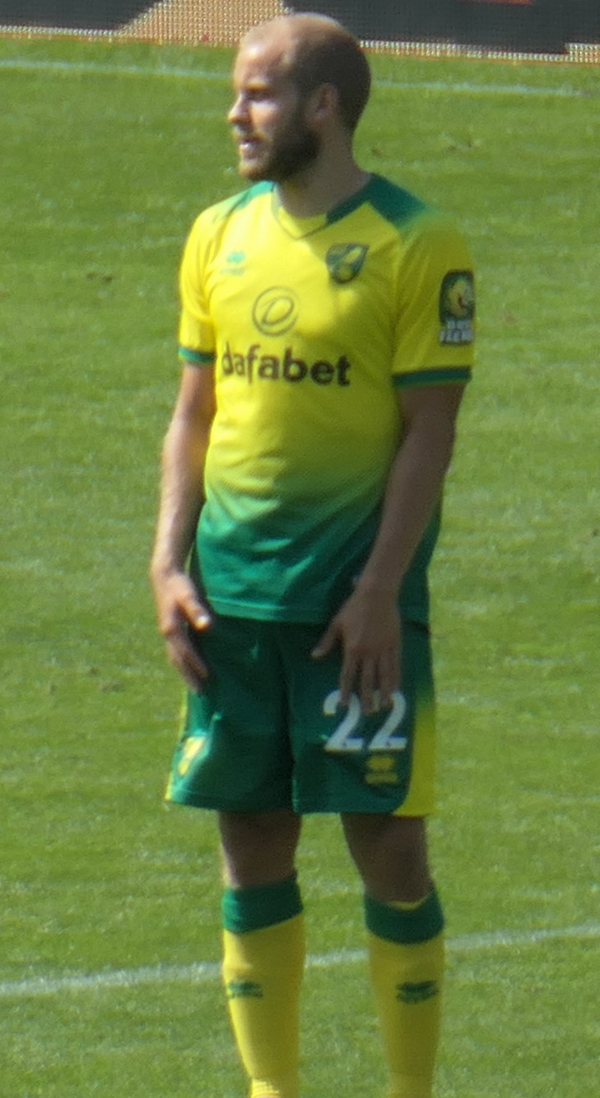
Pukki with Norwich City in 2019

On 3 July 2019, Pukki signed a new three-year contract with the Premier League newcomers. On 9 August, he scored his first Premier League goal in a 4–1 away loss to Liverpool on the opening day of the new season. Eight days later, he scored a hat-trick against Newcastle United in a 3–1 victory, Norwich's first hat-trick in the Premier League since Efan Ekoku against Everton in September 1993. For the month of August he was named the Premier League Player of the Month, and the PFA Premier League Player of the Month. Pukki scored eleven Premier League goals in total for Norwich but was unable to prevent the Canaries from being relegated to the Championship.

==== 2020–21 season ====
Pukki remained at Norwich following their relegation to the Championship and scored his first goal of the season in a 2–2 draw with Preston North End at Carrow Road. Pukki continued his prolific form in the Championship and hit his fiftieth goal for the Canaries with a brace in a 2–1 win at Blackburn Rovers. Pukki was named Championship Player of the Month for February 2021, scoring seven goals in seven games. On 6 April 2021, he scored his first ever Championship hat-trick and his twenty-fifth goal of the season in a 7–0 thrashing of Huddersfield Town.

In April 2021, he was named on the EFL Team of the Season and nominated for the EFL Championship Player of the Season. The award was however won by his teammate Emiliano Buendía.

==== 2021–22 season ====
Pukki scored his first goal of the season against Leicester from the penalty spot, in a 2–1 defeat. Pukki would also net his first goal of the season from open play against Watford. He scored in back to back wins for Norwich against Brentford and Southampton, the latter of which was the club's first game under the management of Dean Smith. Over the course of the season, Pukki would net 11 goals and finish the season as Norwich's top goalscorer for 4th consecutive season. He would also be voted Norwich City's player of the season, however once again Norwich City were relegated to the championship.

==== 2022–23 season ====
Despite being linked with moves away, Pukki remained at Norwich for the 2022–23 season. He netted his first goal of the season in a 3–0 win against Coventry City. Pukki would net a brace a few days later in a 3–2 win against Bristol City. He would net the only goal of the match as Norwich beat Blackpool 1–0. Pukki would net a brace away to promotion chasing Sheffield United in a 2–2 draw, however would miss a late penalty. He would score his third brace of the season in a 4–0 away win against Preston North End, which was manager David Wagner's first game in charge of Norwich. On 5 April 2023, he confirmed that he would be leaving the club upon the expiration of his contract at the end of the season.

During his five seasons with Norwich City, Pukki scored 88 goals in 210 matches making him the fourth-best goalscorer in the club's entire history, behind Johnny Gavin, Terry Allcock and Iwan Roberts. He is regarded as a club legend at Norwich.

=== Minnesota United ===
On 27 June 2023, Major League Soccer franchise Minnesota United announced the signing of Pukki on a free transfer with the Designated Player status until June 2025.

On 7 October, Pukki scored four goals for Minnesota in a 5–2 victory against LA Galaxy, becoming the first Minnesota United player to score four goals in a game and only the second player in the franchise's history to score at least a hat-trick in a MLS regular season game, after Darwin Quintero in 2018.

=== Return to HJK ===
On 24 January 2025, after spending over 13 years abroad, Pukki returned to his former club HJK, signing a two-year contract for an undisclosed fee. On 19 February, in a Finnish League Cup match against his former club KTP, Pukki scored a brace in a 4–0 away win, after his first penalty kick was denied by KTP goalkeeper Maksym Zhuk on the 9th minute of the game.

== International career ==
=== Youth ===
Pukki made his debut in international football on 10 August 2005 at the age of 15 years scoring both goals of the match for Finland U15 in a 0–2 away victory in Cardiff against Wales U15. In the Finland U21 Pukki made his debut at the age of 19 on 6 June 2009, in Tehtaan kenttä, Valkeakoski in a match against Belarus U21.

=== Senior ===
Pukki debuted in the Finland national team on 4 February 2009 when Stuart Baxter used him as a substitute against Japan in a friendly match played in Tokyo. He scored his fifth goal for his country on 22 March 2013, scoring the equaliser as Finland recorded a 1–1 draw at reigning world and European champions Spain in World Cup qualifying. In the 2018–19 UEFA Nations League, Finland won promotion from League C. Pukki scored the only goal of each of the Finns' first three matches, at home against Hungary and home and away to Estonia. In June 2019, he was named the Finnish Footballer of the Year based on his form for Norwich and Finland. Pukki scored ten goals in the UEFA Euro 2020 qualifiers to help Finland to qualify for the first major tournament, UEFA Euro 2020, in their history. Pukki was called up for the UEFA Euro 2020 pre-tournament friendly match against Sweden on 29 May 2021. Pukki played in all 3 international games at the UEFA Euro 2020 tournament. He failed to score in any of these matches however, and Finland was placed 3rd in Group B following a 2–0 defeat to Belgium on 21 June 2021. They were subsequently knocked out of the tournament.

On 12 October 2021, Pukki scored twice in a 2022 FIFA World Cup qualifier against Kazakhstan to overtake Jari Litmanen as the Finnish national team's all-time top goalscorer. In the 2022–23 UEFA Nations League B, Pukki scored three goals in six matches. In 2023, Pukki played 10 games in the UEFA Euro 2024 qualification campaign scoring twice and giving 5 assists.

Pukki announced his retirement from international football with the conclusion of the 2026 World Cup qualifying campaign. He made his final appearance on 17 November 2025, netting a goal in a 4–0 friendly win over Andorra, finishing his career with a record 43 goals in 133 matches.

== Personal life ==
Pukki is married and has two children with his wife. In September 2023, she was expecting their third child. In January 2024 Pukki invested, along with Lukas Hradecky and Matej Hradecky, in a restaurant business in Helsinki.

Pukki is represented by his childhood friend Teemu Turunen.

In October 2024, Pukki invested in his former club Kotkan Työväen Palloilijat, and is currently a minority shareholder of KTP.

== Career statistics ==
=== Club ===
As of match played 8 November 2026

Appearances and goals by club, season and competition
Club	Season	Division	League		National cup (Note: Includes Finnish Cup, DFB-Pokal, Scottish Cup, Danish Cup, FA Cup)		League cup (Note: Includes Finnish League Cup, Scottish League Cup, EFL Cup)		Continental		Other		Total	
Club	Season	Division	Apps	Goals	Apps	Goals	Apps	Goals	Apps	Goals	Apps	Goals	Apps	Goals
KTP	2006	Veikkausliiga	5	0	0	0	0	0	—		—		5	0
KTP	2007	Veikkausliiga	24	3	0	0	0	0	—		—		24	3
KTP	Total		29	3	0	0	0	0	—		—		29	3
Sevilla	2008–09	La Liga	1	0	0	0	—		0	0	—		1	0
Sevilla Atlético	2008–09	Segunda División	17	3	0	0	—		—		—		17	3
Sevilla Atlético	2009–10	Segunda División B	16	0	—		—		—		—		16	0
Sevilla Atlético	Total		33	3	0	0	0	0	0	0	0	0	33	3
HJK	2010	Veikkausliiga	7	2	1	0	0	0	0	0	—		8	2
HJK	2011	Veikkausliiga	18	11	0	0	6	1	6 (Note: Four appearances in UEFA Champions League, two appearances in UEFA Europa League)	5	—		30	17
HJK	Total		25	13	1	0	6	1	6	5	—		38	19
Schalke 04	2011–12	Bundesliga	19	5	2	0	—		0	0	—		21	5
Schalke 04	2012–13	Bundesliga	17	3	2	0	—		5 (Note: Appearance(s) in UEFA Champions League)	0	—		24	3
Schalke 04	2013–14	Bundesliga	1	0	0	0	—		1	0	—		2	0
Schalke 04	Total		37	8	4	0	—		6	0	—		47	8
Celtic	2013–14	Scottish Premiership	25	7	1	0	1	0	5	0	—		32	7
Celtic	2014–15	Scottish Premiership	1	0	0	0	0	0	4	2	—		5	2
Celtic	Total		26	7	1	0	1	0	9	2	—		37	9
Brøndby (loan)	2014–15	Danish Superliga	27	9	3	2	—		—		—		30	11
Brøndby	2015–16	Danish Superliga	33	9	3	1	—		8 (Note: Appearances in UEFA Europa League)	3	—		44	13
Brøndby	2016–17	Danish Superliga	34	20	4	3	—		8	6	—		46	29
Brøndby	2017–18	Danish Superliga	36	17	5	1	—		3	1	—		44	19
Brøndby	Total		130	55	15	7	—		19	10	—		164	72
Norwich City	2018–19	Championship	43	29	1	0	2	1	—		—		46	30
Norwich City	2019–20	Premier League	36	11	2	0	0	0	—		—		38	11
Norwich City	2020–21	Championship	41	26	1	0	0	0	—		—		42	26
Norwich City	2021–22	Premier League	37	11	3	0	1	0	—		—		41	11
Norwich City	2022–23	Championship	41	10	1	0	1	0	—		—		43	10
Norwich City	Total		198	87	8	0	4	1	—		—		210	88
Minnesota United	2023	MLS	14	10	—		—		—		5 (Note: Appearances in Leagues Cup)	0	19	10
Minnesota United	2024	MLS	21	4	—		—		—		3 (Note: Two appearances in Leagues Cup, one appearance in MLS Cup playoffs)	0	24	4
Minnesota United	Total		35	14	—		—		—		8	0	43	14
HJK	2025	Veikkausliiga	29	14	1	1	5	5	4 (Note: Appearances in UEFA Conference League)	1	–		39	21
HJK	2026	Veikkausliiga	29	6	4	1	5	3	4	3			15	6
HJK	Total		58	20	5	2	10	8	8	4			54	27
Career total			571	210	34	9	21	10	48	21	8	0	682	250

=== International ===
Appearances and goals by national team and year
National team	Year	Competitive		Friendly		Total	
National team	Year	Apps	Goals	Apps	Goals	Apps	Goals
Finland	2009	0	0	1	0	1	0
Finland	2010	0	0	2	0	2	0
Finland	2011	4 (Note: Appearances in UEFA Euro 2012 qualifying)	0	2	0	6	0
Finland	2012	4 (Note: Two appearances in 2014 FIFA World Cup qualification, two appearances in 2012 Baltic Cup)	0	5	4	9	4
Finland	2013	6 (Note: Appearances in 2014 FIFA World Cup qualification)	2	4	0	10	2
Finland	2014	6 (Note: Appearances in UEFA Euro 2016 qualifying)	0	3	2	9	2
Finland	2015	5	0	2	0	7	0
Finland	2016	4 (Note: Appearances in 2018 FIFA World Cup qualification)	1	6	0	10	1
Finland	2017	5	1	3	0	8	1
Finland	2018	6 (Note: Appearances in 2018–19 UEFA Nations League C)	3	2	2	8	5
Finland	2019	10 (Note: Appearances in UEFA Euro 2020 qualifying)	10	0	0	10	10
Finland	2020	6 (Note: Appearances in 2020–21 UEFA Nations League B)	2	1	0	7	2
Finland	2021	11 (Note: Eight appearances and six goals in 2022 FIFA World Cup qualification, three appearances in UEFA Euro 2020)	6	2	0	13	6
Finland	2022	6 (Note: Appearances in 2022–23 UEFA Nations League B)	3	2	1	8	4
Finland	2023	10 (Note: Appearances in UEFA Euro 2024 qualifying)	2	0	0	10	2
Finland	2024	6 (Note: One appearance and one goal in UEFA Euro 2024 qualifying, five appearances in 2024–25 UEFA Nations League B)	1	3	2	9	3
Finland	2025	4 (Note: Appearances in 2026 FIFA World Cup qualification)	0	2	1	6	1
Total		93	31	40	12	133	43

== Honours ==
Sevilla Youth

- Copa del Rey Juvenil de Fútbol: 2008

HJK

- Veikkausliiga: 2010, 2011
- Finnish Cup: 2011, 2025
- Finnish League Cup runner-up: 2025

Celtic

- Scottish Premiership: 2013–14

Brøndby IF

- Danish Cup: 2017–18

Norwich City

- EFL Championship: 2018–19, 2020–21

Individual

- Veikkausliiga All Stars: 2011
- Danish Superliga Player of the Month: November 2014, August 2016
- EFL Championship Player of the Season: 2018–19
- EFL Championship Golden Boot: 2018–19
- EFL Team of the Season: 2018–19
- PFA Fans' Player of the Year: 2018–19 Championship
- PFA Team of the Year: 2018–19 Championship, 2020–21 Championship
- Premier League Player of the Month: August 2019
- Finnish Sports Personality of the Year: 2019
- Finnish Footballer of the Year: 2019, 2020
- Norwich City Player of the Season: 2019, 2022
- EFL Championship Player of the Month: February 2021
- EFL Championship Team of the Season: 2020–21

== See also ==
- List of top international men's football goalscorers by country
- List of men's footballers with 100 or more international caps
