= Finland national football team =

Men's association football team

Finland
- Nickname(s): Huuhkajat (The Eagle-owls)
- Association: Suomen Palloliitto (SPL)
- Confederation: UEFA (Europe)
- Head coach: Jacob Friis (until December 2026) Mika Lehkosuo (from January 2027)
- Captain: Lukas Hradecky
- Most caps: Jari Litmanen (137)
- Top scorer: Teemu Pukki (43)
- Home stadium: Helsinki Olympic Stadium
- FIFA code: FIN
First colours	Second colours

FIFA ranking
- Current: 75 (18 November 2026)
- Highest: 33 (March 2007)
- Lowest: 110 (July–August 2017)

First international
- Finland 2–5 Sweden (Helsinki, Finland; 22 October 1911) as Finland; Sweden 1–0 Finland (Stockholm, Sweden; 29 May 1919)

Biggest win
- Finland 10–2 Estonia (Helsinki, Finland; 11 August 1922); Finland 8–0 San Marino (Helsinki, Finland; 17 November 2010)

Biggest defeat
- Germany 13–0 Finland (Leipzig, Germany; 1 September 1940)

European Championship
- Appearances: 1 (first in 2020)
- Best result: Group stage (2020)

Olympic Games
- Appearances: 4 (first in 1912)
- Best result: Fourth place (1912)

Baltic Cup
- Appearances: 2 (first in 2012)
- Best result: Runners-up (2012)

The Finland national football team (Finnish: Suomen jalkapallomaajoukkue, Swedish: Finlands fotbollslandslag) represents Finland in men's international football competitions and is controlled by the Football Association of Finland, the governing body for football in Finland, which was founded in 1907. The team has been a member of FIFA since 1908 and a UEFA member since 1957.

Finland had never qualified for a major tournament until securing a spot at UEFA Euro 2020. After decades of average results and campaigns, the nation made progress in the 2000s, achieving notable results against established European teams and reaching a peak of 33rd in the FIFA World Rankings in 2007. Afterward, their performances and results declined, drawing them to their all-time low of 110th in the FIFA Rankings in 2017. Nine years after their all-time low in the FIFA Rankings, as of November 2026, they sit at 75th place in the overall ranking.

== History ==
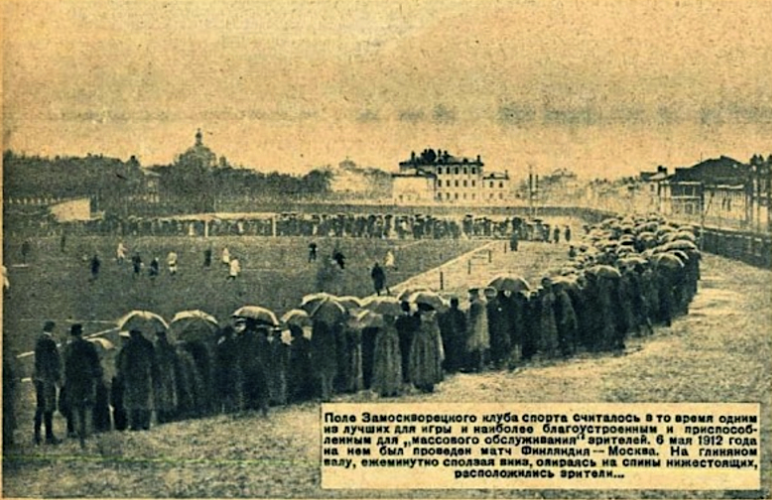
Finland team playing a Moscow XI in Moscow 1912

=== Early history ===
The Football Association of Finland was founded in 1907 and became a member of FIFA the next year. At the time, Finland was an autonomous grand duchy ruled by the Russian Emperors. Finland played its first international on 22 October 1911, as Sweden beat the Finns at the Eläintarha Stadium in Helsinki. Finland participated the 1912 Summer Olympics in Stockholm, beating Italy and the Russian Empire, but losing the bronze medal match against the Netherlands.

=== Period of dispersion ===
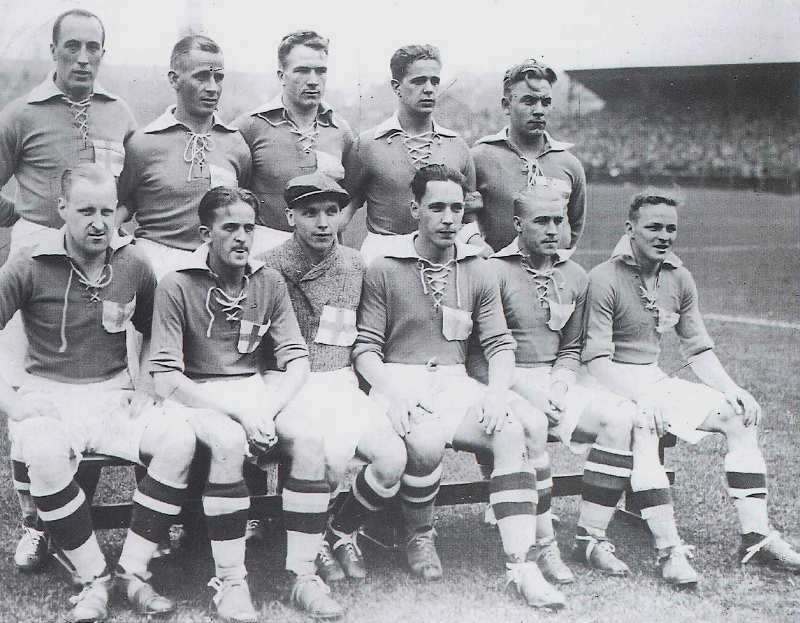
The Finnish national team against Denmark in 1933

After the 1918 Civil War, the Finnish sports movement was divided into the right-wing Finnish Gymnastics and Sports Federation (SVUL) and the leftist Finnish Workers' Sports Federation (TUL). The Finnish Football Association was a member of the SVUL. Both sides had their own championship series, and between 1919 and 1939 the Finland national team was selected from Football Association players only. The Finnish Workers' Sports Federation football team participated in the competitions of the international labour movement.

However, from the late 1920s several top footballers defected from the TUL and joined the Football Association so as to be eligible for the national team. During the 1930s, these ″defectors″ formed the spine of the national team. For example, the Finland squad at the 1936 Summer Olympics included eight former TUL players. In 1937, Finland participated FIFA World Cup qualification for the first time, losing all three matches against Sweden, Germany and Estonia.

From 1939, TUL players were selected for the national team and finally, in 1956, the TUL and the Football Association series were merged.

=== Post-war years ===
The 1952 Summer Olympics in Helsinki saw the Finnish hosts lose to Austria in the first round. Finland did, however, win the unofficial Nordic championship in 1964 and 1966.

Finland also took part in European Championship qualifying from the 1968 event, but had to wait for its first win until 1978.

=== Late 20th century ===
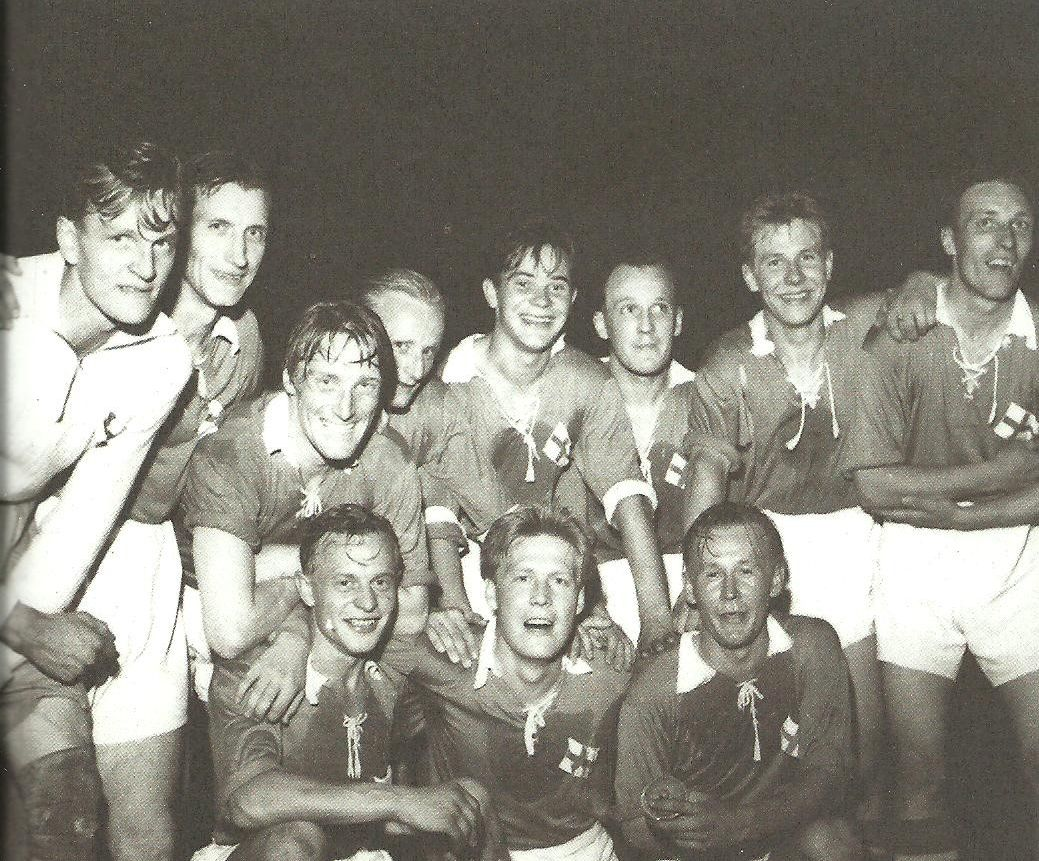
Finnish team after the victory over Yugoslavia in 1950

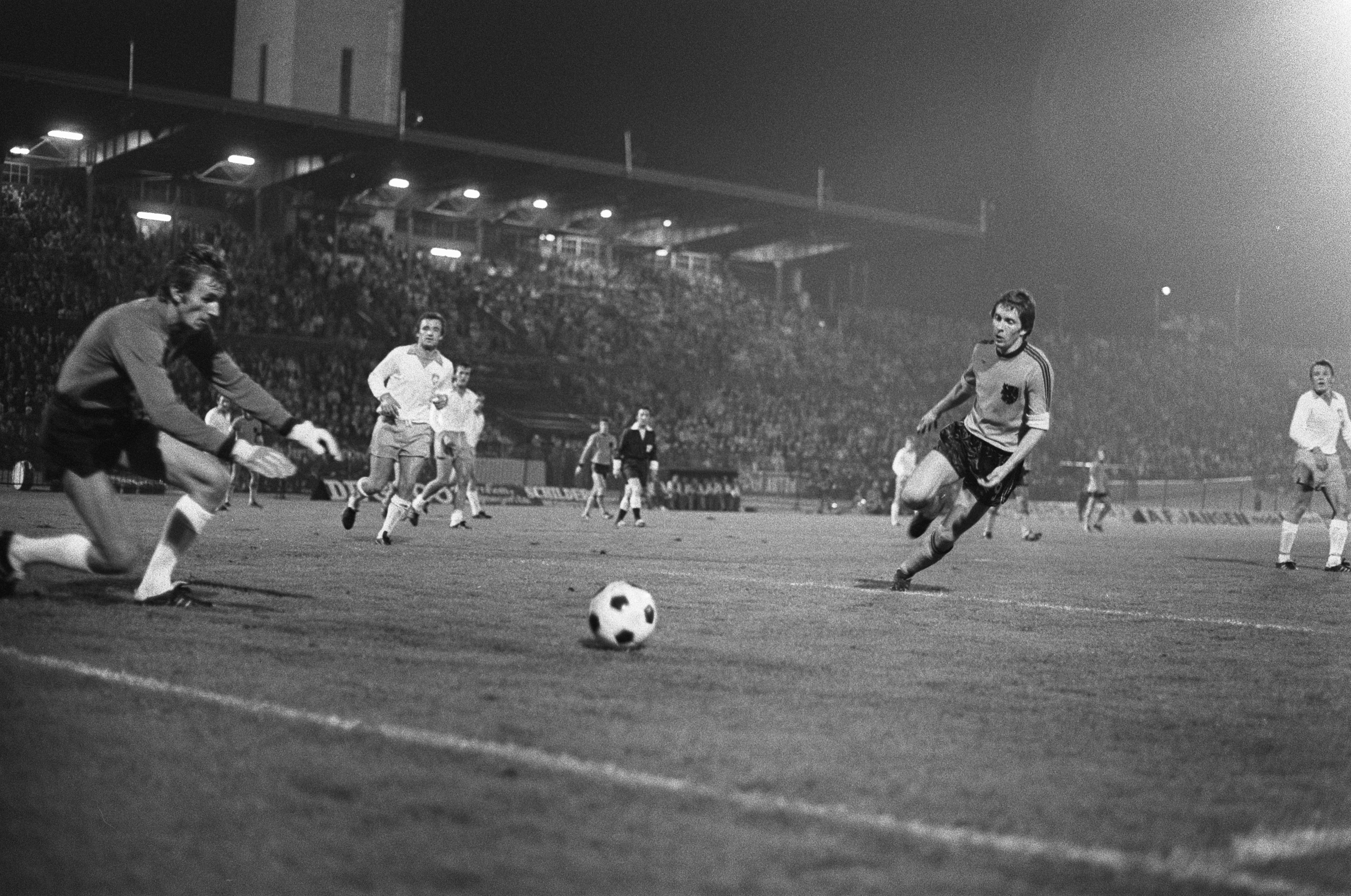
Finland against the Netherlands from 1975

Finland missed out on qualification for Euro 1980 by just a point and for the 1986 World Cup by two points. Finland was invited to take part in the 1980 Summer Olympics in Moscow after many Western countries announced they would boycott the games, but failed to progress from its group.

By the mid-1990s Finland started to have more players in high-profile European leagues, led by Ajax superstar Jari Litmanen. In 1996, Euro 1992-winning coach Richard Møller Nielsen was hired to take Finland to the 1998 World Cup. The team enjoyed mixed fortunes in the campaign, the high points of which were a draw and a win away to Norway and Switzerland respectively. Going into the last match, Finland needed a win at home to Hungary to earn a place in the play-offs. They led the game 1–0 going into injury time, but scored an own goal, and their qualification campaign was over. Møller Nielsen also tried to lead Finland to Euro 2000. In that campaign the Finns recorded a sensational win away to Turkey, but couldn't compete with Germany and Turkey in the long run.

Antti Muurinen succeeded Møller Nielsen as coach in 2000. He had arguably the most talented group of Finnish players ever at his disposal, including players such as Antti Niemi, Sami Hyypiä, Teemu Tainio and Mikael Forssell in addition to the legendary Litmanen. The team performed quite well under him in qualification for the 2002 World Cup despite a difficult group, earning two draws against Germany and a home draw with England as well as beating Greece 5–1 in Helsinki. In the end, however, England and Germany proved too strong, and the Finns finished third in the group, although they were the only team in the group not to lose at home. Hopes were high going into qualification for Euro 2004 after the promising previous campaign and friendly wins over the likes of Norway, Belgium and Portugal (which saw the Finns jump from 40th to 30th in the Elo ranking). However, Finland started the campaign by losing to Wales and Yugoslavia (later Serbia and Montenegro, now two separate nations). These losses were followed by two defeats by Italy, and a 3–0 home win over Serbia and Montenegro was little consolation as the Finns finished fourth in the group. In qualification for the 2006 World Cup, Finland failed to score a single point in six matches against the top three teams in their group, the Netherlands, the Czech Republic and Romania. Muurinen was sacked in June 2005 and replaced by caretaker Jyrki Heliskoski, but results didn't improve.

=== Recent history ===
In August 2005, it was announced that Englishman Roy Hodgson would become the new Finland coach in 2006, and he started the job in January of that year. Hodgson stepped down as manager after they failed to qualify for Euro 2008.

Hodgson's replacement was a Scotsman, Stuart Baxter, who signed a contract until the end of the 2012 European Championship qualification campaign. In the Euro 2008 qualifying Finland needed to win their last qualifying game away to Portugal to qualify for their first major football tournament. However, the match ended 0–0, meaning the team missed out on qualification to the tournament, with Finland ending the group stage with 24 points and Portugal with 27 points. However, the performance in qualifying led to the Finns gaining their best-ever FIFA world ranking to date at 33rd.

The 2010 World Cup qualifying campaign saw Finland again finish third in their group with five wins, three draws and two defeats. They were the only team in qualifying not to lose to eventual 3rd-place finishers Germany. In both the home and away matches Finland had led Germany, only to concede late equalizers.

==== Mixu Paatelainen era (2011–2015) ====
During the Euro 2012 qualifying, head coach Baxter was sacked, and on 31 March 2011 he was replaced by former national team player Mixu Paatelainen. Paatelainen started his tenure with a win against San Marino, only to be followed by a 5–0 loss against Sweden. Finland eventually finished fourth in its group with only three wins, two of them against San Marino.

Paatelainen's deal with the Finnish FA extended until 2016, covering the UEFA Euro 2012 qualifiers, and also the next 2014 FIFA World Cup qualification and the UEFA Euro 2016 qualifiers. As Finland had already been eliminated from UEFA Euro 2012, his main task was to renew the national team with a generation switch, and try to qualify for one or more of the tournaments during his projected tenure as Finland's head coach. This included ultimately leaving out Jari Litmanen, the most capped player and the team's long-served captain and "The King of Finnish Football".

In the 2014 World Cup qualifying campaign, Finland's best result was a 1–1 draw against reigning world champions Spain. They finished third in the five-team Group I, behind Spain and France. On 14 June 2015, Paatelainen was sacked following his fourth defeat in a row during the Euro 2016 qualifying campaign. Finland eventually finished fourth in Euro 2016 qualifying under the guidance of a caretaker manager, Markku Kanerva. They achieved a somewhat noteworthy result when Joel Pohjanpalo's goal gave the Finns a 1–0 win at former European champions Greece, who had reached the second round of the 2014 World Cup and were the top seeds of their qualifying group.

Paatelainen had applied his preferred formation of 4–3–2–1, which he had named joulukuusi – the Christmas tree – due to its shape. Because of the bad results while insistently using the same formation, and his defensive statements to media, he gained a negative reputation among the supporters and the media, and his time as the national team head coach is still remembered mainly for joulukuusi.

==== Hans Backe (2016) ====
On 12 August 2015, Swedish Hans Backe was named the new manager, starting on 1 January 2016. His first official match with the team was on 10 January 2016, and ended in a 3–0 defeat by Sweden. On 12 December 2016, Backe was fired during the 2018 World Cup qualifying campaign, and a former assistant and caretaker Markku Kanerva was named the new head coach. Finland did not win a single game during Backe's time as head coach. His record during 2016 was nine defeats and two draws.

=== Markku Kanerva era (2016–2024) ===
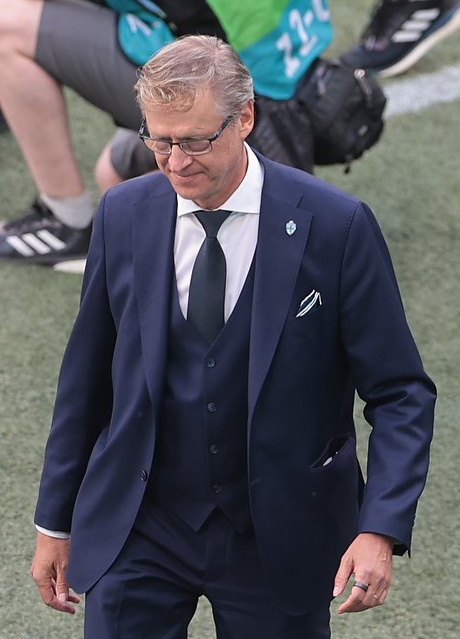
Markku Kanerva managed to lead his Finnish national team to first time qualification to a UEFA European Tournament.

Finland's FIFA ranking had declined from its peak of 33rd in 2007 to 110th in 2017. As UEFA created a new competition, UEFA Nations League, to largely replace international friendlies, Finland were placed in the League C in the first 2018–19 edition due to the low ranking position. Kanerva renewed the team roster, as veterans such as Perparim Hetemaj, Niklas Moisander and Alexander Ring had announced their retirement from international duty. Roman Eremenko was also no longer available for national team due to a competition ban. With a help of goalscoring by Teemu Pukki and saves by captain goalkeeper Lukas Hradecky, Finland won their League C Group 2, ahead of Hungary, Greece and Estonia, and won promotion to League B for the next edition of UEFA Nations League.

Kanerva continued to get outstanding results with the team in the UEFA Euro 2020 qualification, and on 15 November 2019 Finland qualified for the country's first ever major tournament, UEFA Euro 2020, after defeating Liechtenstein 3–0 and finishing as the Group J runner-up behind Italy. The successful qualifying campaign was aided by the distinguished performance of Teemu Pukki, who scored ten goals in ten qualifying matches. However, the tournament finals were postponed to the summer of 2021 due to the COVID-19 pandemic.

The second edition of UEFA Nations League started in autumn 2020, and Finland was drawn with Wales, Ireland and Bulgaria in Group 4. They defeated both Ireland and Bulgaria home and away, but lost both games against Wales, finishing 2nd in the group and missing out on promotion to the following season's League A.

On 12 June 2021, in the UEFA Euro 2020 tournament, Finland beat Denmark 1–0, with Joel Pohjanpalo scoring the only goal with a header to give his country their first goal and the first win in a major tournament finals. The game was interrupted by a heart attack suffered by Denmark midfielder Christian Eriksen, which he survived. Unfortunately, after losing the next two games against Russia and Belgium, Finland finished third in the group and were knocked out at the group stage alongside fellow debutants North Macedonia.

Finland failed to qualify for the 2022 FIFA World Cup, even though Pukki continued his scoring streak with 6 goals in the qualifiers. They were drawn with France, Ukraine, Bosnia and Herzegovina and Kazakhstan in the Group D, finishing 3rd and missing the second round qualification play-offs. The long-serving defenders Jukka Raitala, Paulus Arajuuri and Joona Toivio announced their retirement from international football after the qualifiers.

Having secured their spot in the Nations League B, Finland was drawn in the 2022–23 UEFA Nations League B Group 3 with Bosnia, Romania and Montenegro. They had two wins, two draws and two losses, and defended their place in League B again as the group's runners-up behind Bosnia and Herzegovina.

After qualifying for the previous European tournament, the team and the country had high hopes when starting the UEFA Euro 2024 qualifying campaign. Finland started expectedly with an away loss to Denmark, but won the next three games in a row against Northern Ireland away in March, and Slovenia and San Marino at home in June, with zero goals conceded in the three games. They continued with an away win against Kazakhstan in September, but lost the next three games against Denmark at home, Slovenia away and Kazakhstan at home. The shocking loss to Kazakhstan occurred with two goals conceded late in the game after Finland had been leading 1–0. The defeat took away the possibility of direct qualification. Finland ended the qualifying campaign with two wins in the last two matches, including 4–0 victory over Northern Ireland at home in November, and finished third in the group. As they had placed among the best runner-ups in the previous Nations League, and with a help of overlapping results in other games, Finland had secured their place in the UEFA Euro 2024 qualifying play-offs. In March 2024, in the first decisive play-off match against Wales away, Finland were destroyed 4–1 and so failed to qualify for the UEFA Euro 2024 tournament.

After a run of mediocre results and having been seen as not realising the full potential of the team, speculations had started about the extension of Kanerva's contract. However, during Kanerva's seven-year spell, Finland had ascended in FIFA rankings and as of Summer 2024, were sitting at the 63rd place. The national team roster had undergone a relatively large renovation by Kanerva. He had successfully called up players from the younger generation, including Kaan Kairinen, Benjamin Källman, Oliver Antman, Daniel Håkans and Matti Peltola.

On 17 June 2024, after some ambiguous comments by the Finnish FA president Ari Lahti, it was announced by the FA that Markku Kanerva would continue as the manager of the team until the end of the 2026 FIFA World Cup qualification and for the possible final tournament. The assistant coaches Mika Nurmela and Toni Korkeakunnas would be replaced by Jani Honkavaara, and by former long-time national team players Teemu Tainio and Tim Sparv. Kanerva, with his new staff, was set to start preparing the team for the upcoming 2024–25 UEFA Nations League B, where Finland would face England, Ireland and Greece in Group 2, starting in September. Finland lost both games against Greece and England away with apathetic performances. According to Helsingin Sanomat, Kanerva was by that point only a puppet leader of the national team until the 2024 Veikkausliiga season finished, after which assistant coach Jani Honkavaara, also a current manager of Veikkausliiga club KuPS, would be named a sole head coach of the national team, although he then later allegedly declined the job offer. There was also a conflict of interest for Finnish FA president Ari Lahti, who was the owner of KuPS. Finland finished the Nations League campaign at the bottom of the group after six losses, with a 2–13 goal difference, and were relegated to League C. On 22 November 2024, the board of the Finnish FA released head coach Kanerva from his contract.

=== Jacob Friis (2025–present) ===
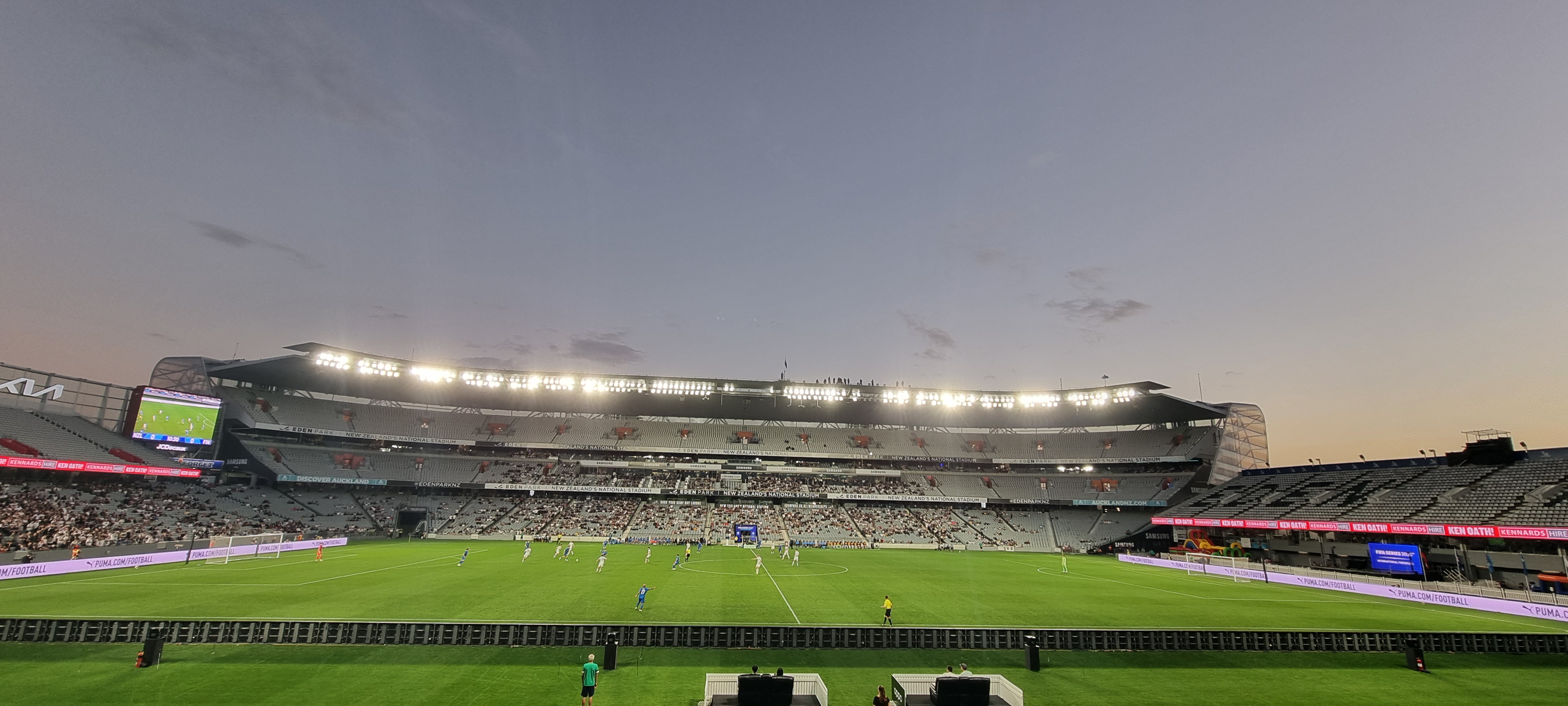
2026 FIFA Series match between New Zealand and Finland. Finland won 2–0 and would go on to win the 2026 New Zealand FIFA Series.

On 20 January 2025, the Finnish FA announced that Danish coach Jacob Friis had been named the new manager of the Finland national team, on a three-year deal with an option for the possible UEFA Euro 2028 final tournament. Friis led Finland in the 2026 FIFA World Cup qualifiers, where they finished third in their group after Netherlands and Poland, with three wins, one draw and four losses. During the qualifiers, Friis called up players from the previous Finland U21 national team, which had qualified for the European final tournament in 2025. On 17 November, Teemu Pukki played his last international match for Finland and scored a goal in 4–0 friendly win against Andorra at Tammelan Stadion.

In late-March 2026, Finland attended the 2026 FIFA Series tournament in Auckland, New Zealand, where they won against the host nation 2–0 and drew with Cape Verde 1–1, eventually winning the mini-tournament. Naatan Skyttä was named the MVP of the tournament.

== Home stadiums ==
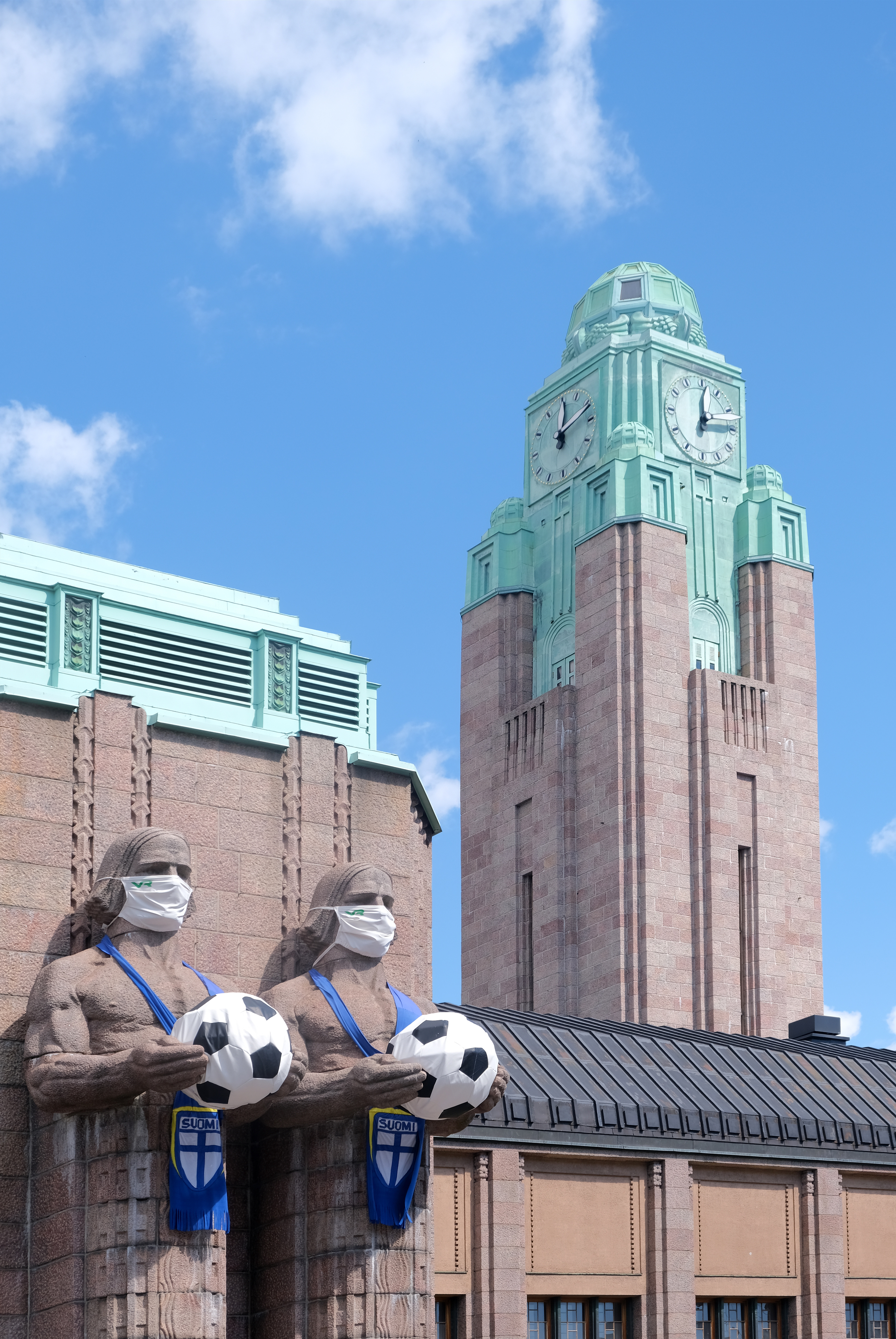
Helsinki Central Station lantern carriers dressed in national colours during the 2020 European Championships in 2021

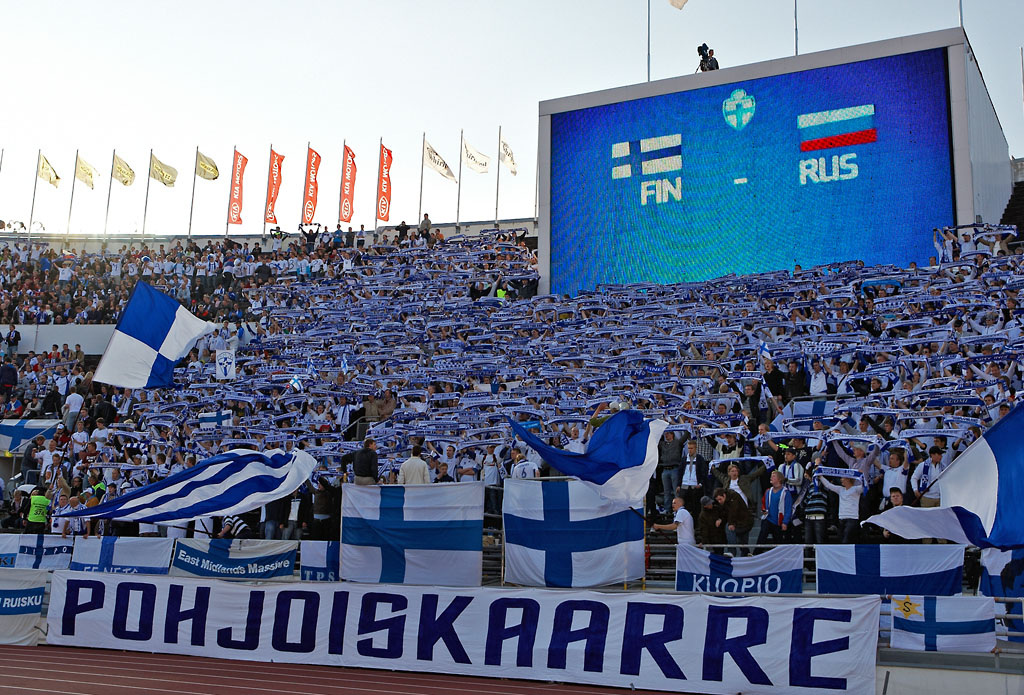
Finnish national team supporters at the Helsinki Olympic Stadium in 2009

Most of Finland's home matches are played at the Helsinki Olympic Stadium in the capital, Helsinki. It has been Finland's principal home stadium ever since its construction was completed in 1938. Before that, Pallokenttä in Helsinki was mainly used.

During 2000s and 2010s, some qualifying matches against lower profile opponents and some friendlies were hosted at the Tampere Stadium in Tampere, and Veritas Stadion in Turku. Helsinki's Bolt Arena, which has artificial turf, is also used for some friendlies and qualifiers. During the reconstruction of Helsinki Olympic Stadium between 2016 and 2020, Tampere Stadium served as the main stadium for qualifying games.

The team returned permanently to Helsinki Olympic Stadium in 2020, after a delayed reconstruction and renovation were finished, but had to play some of the first games without an audience due to the pandemic.

In the five home matches during the UEFA Euro 2024 qualification campaign, Huuhkajat had a record audience average of 31,406 (157,029 in total), which corresponds to around 97 per cent of the stadium's full capacity.

== Kits and crest ==
Finland's home kit worn at 2008

Finland's home kit worn at UEFA Euro 2020

Finland's kit is currently supplied by American brand Nike. They replaced German company Adidas, who supplied Finland's kits between 1979 and 2013.

=== Kit sponsorship ===
Kit supplier	Period
(Germany) Adidas	1979–2013
(United States) Nike	2014–present

== Results and fixtures ==
The following is a list of match results in the last 12 months, as well as any future matches that have been scheduled.

Win Draw Loss Fixture

=== 2026 ===
27 March 2026 2026 FIFA Series	New Zealand	0–2	Finland	Auckland, New Zealand
19:15 UTC+13		Report	Pohjanpalo 25'; Oksanen 85'	Stadium: Eden Park; Attendance: 17,603; Referee: Casey Reibelt (Australia)

30 March 2026 2026 FIFA Series	Cape Verde	1–1 (4–2 p)	Finland	Auckland, New Zealand
16:00 UTC+13	Pires 67'	Report	Skyttä 45+4'	Stadium: Eden Park; Attendance: 2,060; Referee: Anna-Marie Keighley (New Zealand)
	Penalties
	S. Cabral (penalty scored); J. Cabral (penalty missed); K. Pina (penalty scored); Da Costa (penalty scored); R. Mendes (penalty scored)		(penalty scored) Walta; (penalty scored) Valakari; (penalty missed) Keskinen; (penalty missed) Oksanen

31 May 2026 Friendly	Germany	4–0	Finland	Mainz, Germany
20:45 UTC+2	Undav 34', 57'; Wirtz 48'; Musiala 63'	Report		Stadium: Mewa Arena; Attendance: 25,122; Referee: Matheus Candançan (Brazil)

5 June 2026 Friendly	Hungary	2–1	Finland	Budapest, Hungary
20:45 UTC+2	Varga 26', 43'	Report	T. Miettinen 71'	Stadium: Puskás Aréna; Attendance: 53,148; Referee: Ante Čulina (Croatia)

26 September 2026 2026–27 Nations League	San Marino	0–7	Finland	Serravalle, San Marino
18:00 UTC+2		Report	Pohjanpalo 5', 79', 88' (pen.); Svanbäck 14'; Källman 33'; Walta 50', 55'	Stadium: San Marino Stadium; Attendance: 1,148; Referee: Nathan Verboomen (Belgium)

29 September 2026 2026–27 Nations League	Finland	0–0	Belarus	Helsinki, Finland
19:00 UTC+3		Report		Stadium: Helsinki Olympic Stadium; Attendance: 7,262; Referee: Nikola Dabanović (Montenegro)

3 October 2026 2026–27 Nations League	Finland	2–1	Albania	Helsinki, Finland
16:00 UTC+3	Walta 26', 71'	Report	Manaj 4'	Stadium: Helsinki Olympic Stadium; Attendance: 24,885; Referee: Rob Hennessy (Ireland)

6 October 2026 2026–27 Nations League	Belarus	1–0	Finland	Budapest, Hungary (Note: Due to Belarusian involvement in the Russian invasion of Ukraine, Belarus are required to play their home matches at neutral venues, and behind closed doors, until further notice.)
21:45 UTC+3	Shumansky 1'	Report		Stadium: Illovszky Rudolf Stadion; Attendance: 0 Referee: Sascha Stegemann (Germany)

12 November 2026 2026–27 Nations League	Albania	2–0	Finland	Tirana, Albania
20:45 UTC+1	Muçi 35'; Manaj 50'	Report		Stadium: Arena Kombëtare; Attendance: 20,942; Referee: João Pinheiro (Portugal)

15 November 2026 2026–27 Nations League	Finland	7–2	San Marino	Helsinki, Finland
19:00 UTC+2	Svanbäck 8', 20', 78'; Walta 17'; Pohjanpalo 36', 42'; Håkans 70'	Report	Nanni 26' (pen.), 76'	Stadium: Bolt Arena; Attendance: 7,153; Referee: Georgi Kabakov (Bulgaria)

== Coaching staff ==
Position	Name
Head coach	(Denmark) Jacob Friis
Assistant coach	(Denmark) Lars Stensgaard
Assistant coach	(Finland) Jonatan Johansson
Set-piece coach	(Hungary) Ábel Lőrincz
Goalkeeping coach	(Germany) Dennis Neudahm
Video analyst	(Finland) Henri Lehto
Fitness coach	(Finland) Joni Ruuskanen
Physiotherapist	(Finland) Ville Peltonen
Doctor	(Finland) Heikki Kinnunen
Kit manager	(Finland) Sami Miettinen
Team manager	(Finland) Joonas Vilkki
Press officer	(Finland) Timo Walden

=== Coaching history ===
As of 15 November 2026.

Tenure	Nat	Coach	Record				
Tenure	Nat	Coach	G	W	D	L	Win %
1911–21		None	17	6	2	9	35.29
1922	(Finland)	Jarl Öhman	4	1	0	3	25.00
1923–35		None	77	22	12	43	28.57
1936–37	(Germany)	Ferdinand Fabra	8	1	1	6	12.50
1937–38		None	9	3	0	6	33.33
1939	(Hungary)	Gábor Obitz	6	1	0	5	16.67
1939–43		None	7	0	1	6	0.00
1945	(Sweden)	Axel Mårtensson	2	0	0	2	0.00
1946	(Finland)	Niilo Tammisalo	3	0	0	3	0.00
1947–55	(Finland)	Aatos Lehtonen	51	7	9	35	13.73
1955–58	(West Germany)	Kurt Weinreich	23	3	1	19	13.04
1959–61	(Finland)	Aatos Lehtonen	19	3	0	16	15.79
1962–74	(Finland)	Olavi Laaksonen	91	16	21	54	17.58
1975	(Finland)	Martti Kosma	2	0	1	1	0.00
1975–78	(Finland)	Aulis Rytkönen	30	8	4	18	26.67
1979–81	(Finland)	Esko Malm	27	4	6	17	14.81
1982–87	(Finland)	Martti Kuusela	53	9	11	33	16.98
1988–92	(Finland)	Jukka Vakkila	48	7	21	20	14.58
1993–94	(Finland)	Tommy Lindholm	25	5	7	13	20.00
1994–96	(Finland)	Jukka Ikäläinen	21	7	4	10	33.33
1996–99	(Denmark)	Richard Møller Nielsen	34	9	12	13	26.47
2000–05	(Finland)	Antti Muurinen	72	34	12	26	47.22
2005	(Finland)	Jyrki Heliskoski (caretaker)	6	2	2	2	33.33
2006–07	(England)	Roy Hodgson	22	6	11	5	27.27
2008–10	(England)	Stuart Baxter	31	8	6	17	25.81
2010–2011	(Finland)	Olli Huttunen (caretaker)	1	1	0	0	100.00
2011	(Finland)	Markku Kanerva (caretaker)	2	0	1	1	0.00
2011–2015	(Finland)	Mixu Paatelainen	45	17	11	17	37.78
2015	(Finland)	Markku Kanerva (caretaker)	4	2	2	0	50.00
2016	(Sweden)	Hasse Backe	11	0	2	9	0.00
2016–2024	(Finland)	Markku Kanerva	89	36	14	39	40.45
2025–	(Denmark)	Jacob Friis	20	8	3	9	40.00
Total			828	209	170	449	25.24

== Players ==
=== Current squad ===
The following players were called up for 2026–27 Nations League matches against Albania and San Marino on 12 November and 15 November 2026, respectively.
Caps and goals as of 15 November 2026, after the match against San Marino.

No.	Pos.	Player	Date of birth (age)	Caps	Goals	Club
1	GK	Lukas Hradecky (captain)	24 November 1989 (age 36)	109	0	(French Football Federation) Monaco (Note: Monaco is a Monégasque club playing in the French football league system.)
12	GK	Viljami Sinisalo (vice-captain)	11 October 2001 (age 25)	9	0	(Scottish Football Association) Celtic
23	GK	Lucas Bergström	5 September 2002 (age 24)	1	0	(Royal Spanish Football Federation) Mallorca
3	DF	Arttu Hoskonen	16 April 1997 (age 29)	18	1	(Danish Football Association) Lyngby
4	DF	Robert Ivanov	19 September 1994 (age 32)	45	0	(Football Association of Finland) Inter Turku
13	DF	Juho Lähteenmäki	15 June 2006 (age 20)	11	0	(Danish Football Association) Nordsjælland
17	DF	Ryan Mahuta	7 July 2002 (age 24)	9	0	(Football Association of the Czech Republic) Pardubice
21	DF	Ville Koski (vice-captain)	27 January 2002 (age 24)	15	0	(Royal Spanish Football Federation) Alavés
6	MF	Santeri Väänänen	1 January 2002 (age 24)	10	0	(German Football Association) Karlsruher SC
9	MF	Fredrik Jensen	9 September 1997 (age 29)	39	8	(Hellenic Football Federation) Aris
10	MF	Leo Walta	24 June 2003 (age 23)	20	6	(United States Soccer Federation) Los Angeles FC
15	MF	Onni Valakari	18 August 1999 (age 27)	19	1	(United States Soccer Federation) San Diego FC
16	MF	Roman Eremenko	19 March 1987 (age 39)	74	5	(Football Association of Finland) Gnistan
7	FW	Oliver Antman	15 August 2001 (age 25)	33	8	(Royal Belgian Football Association) Anderlecht
8	FW	Naatan Skyttä	7 May 2002 (age 24)	7	1	(German Football Association) 1. FC Kaiserslautern
11	FW	Adrian Svanbäck	8 June 2004 (age 22)	5	4	(Swedish Football Association) Häcken
18	FW	Topi Keskinen	7 March 2003 (age 23)	18	0	(Danish Football Association) OB
19	FW	Benjamin Källman	17 June 1998 (age 28)	42	11	(German Football Association) Hannover 96
20	FW	Joel Pohjanpalo (vice-captain)	13 September 1994 (age 32)	95	24	(Italian Football Federation) Palermo
22	FW	Daniel Håkans	26 October 2000 (age 26)	18	5	(Polish Football Association) Lech Poznań

=== Recent call-ups ===
The following players have been called up for the team within the last twelve months and are still available for selection.

Pos.	Player	Date of birth (age)	Caps	Goals	Club	Latest call-up
DF	Tony Miettinen	23 September 2002 (age 24)	8	1	(Sweden) Mjällby	v. Albania, 12 November 2026 ^{INJ}
DF	Adam Ståhl	8 October 1994 (age 32)	11	0	(Sweden) Djurgården	v. Albania, 12 November 2026 ^{ILL}
DF	Miro Tenho	2 April 1995 (age 31)	17	0	(Sweden) Djurgården	v. Albania, 12 November 2026 ^{SUS}
DF	Samuli Miettinen	16 June 2004 (age 22)	5	0	(Croatia) Istra 1961	v. Belarus, 6 October 2026
DF	Leo Väisänen	23 July 1997 (age 29)	29	0	(Sweden) Häcken	v. Belarus, 6 October 2026
DF	Rony Jansson	10 January 2004 (age 22)	1	0	(Germany) FC St. Pauli	v. Hungary, 5 June 2026
MF	Anssi Suhonen	14 January 2001 (age 25)	18	0	(Denmark) OB	v. Albania, 12 November 2026 ^{INJ}
MF	Kaan Kairinen	22 December 1998 (age 27)	31	1	(Greece) AEK Athens	v. Albania, 12 November 2026 ^{INJ}
MF	Luka Hyryläinen	25 August 2004 (age 22)	1	0	(Germany) 1. FC Magdeburg	v. Albania, 12 November 2026 ^{U21}
MF	Adam Markhiyev	17 March 2002 (age 24)	14	1	(Germany) 1. FC Nürnberg	v. Albania, 12 November 2026 ^{SUS}
MF	Doni Arifi	11 April 2002 (age 24)	2	0	(Germany) Greuther Fürth	v. Belarus, 6 October 2026
MF	Matti Peltola	3 July 2002 (age 24)	27	0	(United States) D.C. United	v. Belarus, 6 October 2026
MF	Glen Kamara	28 October 1995 (age 31)	72	2	(England) Queens Park Rangers	v. Albania, 3 October 2026 ^{WD}
MF	Niklas Pyyhtiä	25 September 2003 (age 23)	2	1	(Italy) Südtirol	v. Hungary, 5 June 2026
MF	Juho Kilo	23 June 2002 (age 24)	0	0	(Netherlands) ADO Den Haag	v. Hungary, 5 June 2026
MF	Jaakko Oksanen	7 November 2000 (age 26)	3	1	(Kazakhstan) Kairat	v. Cape Verde, 30 March 2026
FW	Oiva Jukkola	21 May 2002 (age 24)	6	0	(Kazakhstan) Kairat	v. Belarus, 6 October 2026
FW	Robin Lod	17 April 1993 (age 33)	85	6	(United States) Chicago Fire	v. Belarus, 29 September 2026 ^{INJ}
FW	Casper Terho	24 June 2003 (age 23)	3	0	(Netherlands) Sparta Rotterdam	v. Hungary, 5 June 2026
FW	Kasper Paananen	16 March 2003 (age 23)	1	0	(Sweden) Kalmar	v. Cape Verde, 30 March 2026
Notes: ^{ILL} = Withdrew due to an illness; ^{INJ} = Withdrew due to an injury; ^{PRE} = Preliminary squad / standby; ^{RET} = Retired from international duty; ^{SUS} = Suspended; ^{U21} = Moved to the U21 team; ^{WD} = Withdrew due to a non-injury issue

== Player records ==
As of 15 November 2026.

Players still active are highlighted in blue

=== Most appearances ===
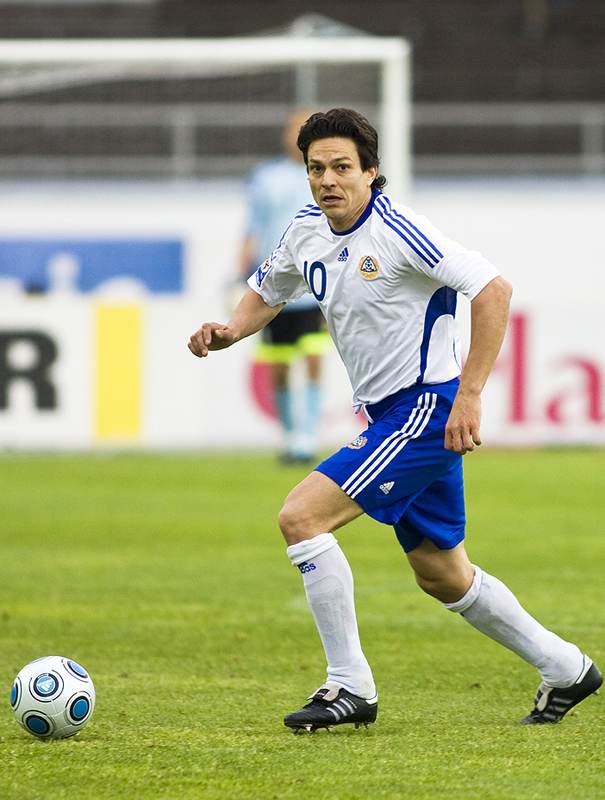
Jari Litmanen is Finland's most capped player with 137 appearances.

Rank	Player	Caps	Goals	Career
1	Jari Litmanen	137	32	1989–2010
2	Teemu Pukki	133	43	2009–2025
3	Lukas Hradecky	109	0	2010–present
4	Jonatan Johansson	106	22	1996–2010
5	Sami Hyypiä	105	5	1992–2010
6	Ari Hjelm	100	20	1983–1996
7	Joonas Kolkka	98	11	1994–2010
8	Joel Pohjanpalo	95	24	2012–present
9	Mikael Forssell	87	29	1999–2014
10	Robin Lod	85	6	2015–present

=== Top goalscorers ===
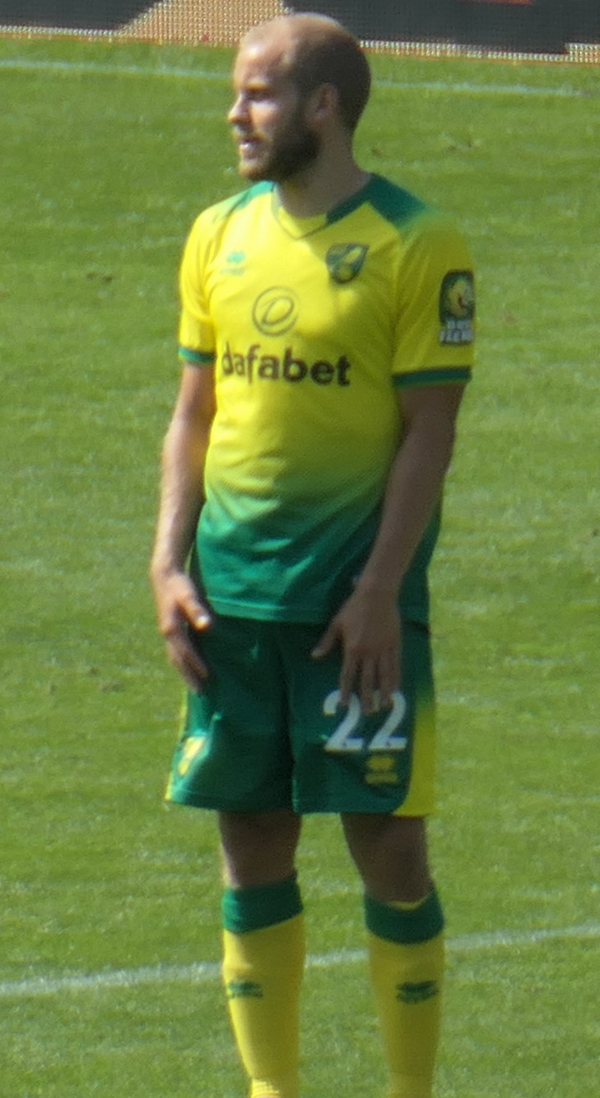
Teemu Pukki is Finland's top scorer with 43 goals.

Rank	Player	Goals	Caps	Ratio	Career
1	Teemu Pukki	43	133	0.32	2009–2025
2	Jari Litmanen	32	137	0.23	1989–2010
3	Mikael Forssell	29	87	0.33	1999–2014
4	Joel Pohjanpalo	24	95	0.25	2012–present
5	Jonatan Johansson	22	106	0.21	1996–2010
6	Ari Hjelm	20	100	0.2	1983–1996
7	Mixu Paatelainen	18	70	0.26	1986–2000
8	Verner Eklöf	17	32	0.53	1919–1927
9	Aulis Koponen	16	39	0.41	1924–1935
9	Gunnar Åström	16	44	0.36	1923–1937

== Competitive record ==
=== FIFA World Cup ===
FIFA World Cup record									Qualification record						
Year	Result	Position	Pld	W	D	L	GF	GA	Campaign	Pld	W	D	L	GF	GA
(Uruguay) 1930	Did not enter								Declined invitation						
(Italy) 1934	Did not enter								Did not enter						
(France) 1938	Did not qualify								1938	3	0	0	3	0	7
(Brazil) 1950	Withdrew during qualifying								1950	2	0	1	1	1	4
(Switzerland) 1954	Did not qualify								1954	4	0	2	2	7	13
(Sweden) 1958	Did not qualify								1958	4	0	0	4	2	19
(Chile) 1962	Did not qualify								1962	4	0	0	4	3	12
(England) 1966	Did not qualify								1966	6	1	0	5	5	20
(Mexico) 1970	Did not qualify								1970	6	1	0	5	6	28
(West Germany) 1974	Did not qualify								1974	6	1	1	4	3	21
(Argentina) 1978	Did not qualify								1978	6	2	0	4	11	16
(Spain) 1982	Did not qualify								1982	8	1	0	7	4	27
(Mexico) 1986	Did not qualify								1986	8	3	2	3	7	12
(Italy) 1990	Did not qualify								1990	6	1	1	4	4	16
(United States) 1994	Did not qualify								1994	10	2	1	7	9	18
(France) 1998	Did not qualify								1998	8	3	2	3	11	12
(South Korea) (Japan) 2002	Did not qualify								2002	8	3	3	2	12	7
(Germany) 2006	Did not qualify								2006	12	5	1	6	21	19
(South Africa) 2010	Did not qualify								2010	10	5	3	2	14	14
(Brazil) 2014	Did not qualify								2014	8	2	3	3	5	9
(Russia) 2018	Did not qualify								2018	10	2	3	5	9	13
(Qatar) 2022	Did not qualify								2022	8	3	2	3	10	10
(Canada) (Mexico) (United States) 2026	Did not qualify								2026	8	3	1	4	8	14
(Morocco) (Portugal) (Spain) 2030	Future event								Future event						
(Saudi Arabia) 2034	Future event								Future event						
Total		0/23								145	38	26	81	152	311

=== UEFA European Championship ===
UEFA European Championship record										Qualifying record						
Year	Result	Position	Pld	W	D	L	GF	GA	Squad	Campaign	Pld	W	D	L	GF	GA
(France) 1960	Did not enter									Did not enter						
(Spain) 1964	Did not enter									Did not enter						
(Italy) 1968	Did not qualify									1968	6	0	2	4	5	12
(Belgium) 1972	Did not qualify									1972	6	0	1	5	1	16
(Socialist Federal Republic of Yugoslavia) 1976	Did not qualify									1976	6	0	1	5	3	13
(Italy) 1980	Did not qualify									1980	6	2	2	2	10	15
(France) 1984	Did not qualify									1984	6	0	1	5	3	14
(West Germany) 1988	Did not qualify									1988	6	1	1	4	4	10
(Sweden) 1992	Did not qualify									1992	8	1	4	3	5	8
(England) 1996	Did not qualify									1996	10	5	0	5	18	18
(Belgium) (Netherlands) 2000	Did not qualify									2000	8	3	1	4	13	13
(Portugal) 2004	Did not qualify									2004	8	3	1	4	9	10
(Austria) (Switzerland) 2008	Did not qualify									2008	14	6	6	2	13	7
(Poland) (Ukraine) 2012	Did not qualify									2012	10	3	1	6	16	16
(France) 2016	Did not qualify									2016	10	3	3	4	9	10
(Europe) 2020	Group stage	17th	3	1	0	2	1	3	Squad	2020	10	6	0	4	16	10
(Germany) 2024	Did not qualify									2024 (PO)	11	6	0	5	19	14
(England) (Scotland) (Republic of Ireland) (Wales) 2028	To be determined									To be determined						
(Italy) (Turkey) 2032	To be determined									To be determined						
Total	Group stage	1/17	3	1	0	2	1	3	—	—	125	39	24	62	144	186

=== UEFA Nations League ===
UEFA Nations League record
Season	Division	Group	Pos	Pld	W	D	L	GF	GA	P/R	RK
2018–19	C	2	1st	6	4	0	2	5	3	▲	28th
2020–21	B	4	2nd	6	4	0	2	7	5	Same position	21st
2022–23	B	3	2nd	6	2	2	2	8	6	Same position	21st
2024–25	B	2	4th	6	0	0	6	2	13	▼	32nd
2026–27	C	1	3rd	6	3	1	2	16	6	Same position	41st
Total				30	13	3	14	38	33	21st	

=== FIFA Series ===
FIFA Series record
Year	Result	Pld	W	D	L	GF	GA
2024	Did not enter						
(New Zealand) 2026	Champions	2	1	1	0	3	1
Total		2	1	1	0	3	1

=== Olympic Games ===
Olympic Games record
Year	Result	Position	Pld	W	D	L	GF	GA	Squad
As Grand Duchy of Finland
(Greece) 1896	No football tournament was held								
(France) 1900	Did not enter								
(United States) 1904	Did not enter								
(United Kingdom) 1908	Did not enter								
(Sweden) 1912	Fourth place	4th	4	2	0	2	5	16	Squad
Since 1917, Declaration of Independence (Finland)
(Belgium) 1920	Did not enter								
(France) 1924	Did not enter								
(Netherlands) 1928	Did not enter								
(United States) 1932	No football tournament was held								
(Nazi Germany) 1936	Round of 16	14th	1	0	0	1	3	7	Squad
(United Kingdom) 1948	Did not enter								
(Finland) 1952	Round of 16	9th	1	0	0	1	3	4	Squad
(Australia) 1956	Did not enter								
(Italy) 1960	Did not qualify								
(Japan) 1964	Did not qualify								
(Mexico) 1968	Did not qualify								
(West Germany) 1972	Did not qualify								
(Canada) 1976	Did not qualify								
(Soviet Union) 1980	Group stage	9th	3	1	1	1	3	2	Squad
(United States) 1984	Did not qualify								
(South Korea) 1988	Did not qualify								
Since 1992	Olympic football has been an under-23 tournament								
Total	Fourth place	4/17	9	3	1	5	14	29	—

=== Nordic Football Championship ===
Nordic Football Championship record
Year	Result	Position	Pld	W	D	L	GF	GA
1929–32	Fourth place	4th	12	2	2	8	23	52
1933–36	Fourth place	4th	12	3	1	8	18	36
1937–47	Fourth place	4th	12	1	1	10	12	51
1948–51	Fourth place	4th	12	1	3	8	11	28
1952–55	Fourth place	4th	12	1	1	10	13	53
1956–59	Fourth place	4th	12	0	1	11	8	44
1960–63	Fourth place	4th	12	2	2	8	14	37
1964–67	Third place	3rd	12	5	2	5	14	17
1968–71	Fourth place	4th	12	0	4	8	10	31
1972–77	Fourth place	4th	12	1	4	7	10	26
1978–80	Fourth place	4th	6	1	4	7	10	26
1981–85	Fourth place	4th	6	1	1	4	7	11
2000–01	Champions	1st	5	4	0	1	7	3
Total	1 Title	13/14	137	21	24	92	150	401

=== Baltic Cup ===
Baltic Cup record
Year	Result	Pld	W	D	L	GF	GA
2012	Runners-up	2	1	1	0	3	2
2014	Third place	2	1	0	1	2	1
Total		4	2	1	1	5	3

== Head-to-head record ==
This list is Finland national team complete records, both friendlies and competitive matches.

As of 15 November 2026

Opponent	GP	W	D	L	GF	GA	GD	Win %
All Nations	839	222	171	446	991	1,719	−728	26.46

Against	Played	Won	Drawn	Lost	GF	GA	GD	% Won
Albania	9	5	1	3	10	9	+1	55.56
Algeria	1	0	0	1	0	2	−2	0.00
Andorra	3	2	1	0	7	0	+7	66.67
Armenia	6	5	1	0	11	1	+10	83.33
Austria	11	1	2	8	11	24	−13	9.09
Azerbaijan	8	7	0	1	15	5	+10	87.50
Bahrain	5	4	1	0	9	1	+8	80.00
Barbados	1	0	1	0	0	0	+0	0.00
Belarus	8	2	4	2	7	6	+1	25.00
Belgium	12	4	4	4	19	22	−3	33.33
Bermuda	1	1	0	0	2	0	+2	100.00
Bolivia	2	0	1	1	2	5	−3	0.00
Bosnia and Herzegovina	7	2	2	3	11	12	−1	28.57
Brazil	3	0	0	3	3	9	−6	0.00
Bulgaria	10	2	1	7	7	20	−13	20.00
Cape Verde	1	0	1	0	1	1	+0	0.00
Cameroon	2	0	1	1	0	2	−2	0.00
Canada	1	1	0	0	3	2	+1	100.00
Chile	1	0	0	1	0	2	−2	0.00
China	4	1	0	3	7	6	+1	25.00
Colombia	1	0	0	1	1	3	−2	0.00
Costa Rica	1	0	0	1	1	2	−1	0.00
Croatia	2	0	1	1	1	2	−1	0.00
Cyprus	4	2	1	1	7	4	+3	50.00
Czech Republic (Note: Includes matches against Czechoslovakia)	11	3	3	5	14	22	−8	27.27
Denmark	62	12	10	40	62	155	−93	19.35
East Germany	7	2	1	4	8	21	−13	28.57
Ecuador	1	0	0	1	1	3	−2	0.00
Egypt	2	0	0	2	2	4	−2	0.00
England (Note: Includes matches against Great Britain)	14	0	2	12	8	45	−37	0.00
Estonia	38	18	10	10	79	45	+34	47.37
Faroe Islands	5	5	0	0	14	1	+13	100.00
France	11	1	0	10	5	22	−17	9.09
Georgia	2	1	1	0	2	1	+1	50.00
Germany	24	1	6	17	19	86	−67	4.17
Greece	20	6	3	11	22	34	−12	30.00
Honduras	1	1	0	0	2	1	+1	100.00
Hungary	19	3	3	13	13	49	−36	15.79
Iceland	14	7	3	4	21	15	+6	50.00
India	2	1	1	0	2	0	+2	50.00
Iraq	2	0	0	2	0	3	−3	0.00
Israel	5	2	1	2	6	6	+0	40.00
Italy	15	1	1	13	8	36	−28	6.67
Japan	2	0	0	2	1	7	−6	0.00
Jordan	1	1	0	0	2	1	+1	100.00
Kazakhstan	7	5	1	1	9	3	+6	71.43
Kosovo	2	1	1	0	2	1	+1	50.00
Kuwait	7	3	2	2	6	5	+1	42.86
Latvia	17	10	3	4	32	18	+14	58.82
Liechtenstein	5	3	2	0	9	3	+6	60.00
Lithuania	7	4	1	2	19	8	+11	57.14
Luxembourg	5	4	0	1	12	4	+8	80.00
Malaysia	1	0	0	1	1	2	−1	0.00
Malta	10	6	2	2	15	6	+9	60.00
Mexico	4	0	1	3	2	7	−5	0.00
Moldova	4	2	1	1	7	5	+2	50.00
Montenegro	2	2	0	0	4	0	+4	100.00
Morocco	2	1	1	0	1	0	+1	50.00
Netherlands	16	1	2	13	14	49	−35	6.25
New Zealand	1	1	0	0	2	0	+2	100.00
North Korea	1	1	0	0	3	0	+3	100.00
North Macedonia	6	3	2	1	12	3	+9	50.00
Northern Ireland	11	5	2	4	18	12	+6	45.45
Norway	68	9	17	42	82	183	−101	13.24
Oman	6	3	3	0	7	2	+5	50.00
Peru	1	0	0	1	3	7	−4	0.00
Poland	35	4	8	23	32	86	−54	11.43
Portugal	11	1	4	6	8	18	−10	9.09
Qatar	4	1	3	0	4	3	+1	25.00
Republic of Ireland	9	2	2	5	5	14	−9	22.22
Romania	13	0	5	8	6	29	−23	0.00
Russia (Note: Includes matches against the Soviet Union)	21	1	5	15	13	67	−54	4.76
San Marino	8	8	0	0	37	4	+33	100.00
Saudi Arabia	4	2	1	1	7	4	+3	50.00
Scotland	9	0	3	6	7	20	−13	0.00
Serbia (Note: Includes matches against Yugoslavia and Serbia and Montenegro)	10	2	2	6	10	32	−22	20.00
Singapore	1	1	0	0	1	0	+1	100.00
Slovakia	4	0	1	3	1	6	−5	0.00
Slovenia	4	2	1	1	5	4	+1	50.00
South Korea	3	0	0	3	0	5	−5	0.00
Spain	8	1	2	5	5	16	−11	12.50
Sweden	91	11	11	69	96	299	−203	12.09
Switzerland	6	2	0	4	7	10	−3	33.33
Thailand	5	1	1	3	6	12	−6	20.00
Trinidad and Tobago	5	3	1	1	8	7	+1	60.00
Tunisia	3	2	1	0	6	2	+4	66.67
Turkey	15	6	4	5	22	24	−2	40.00
United Arab Emirates	1	0	1	0	1	1	+0	0.00
Ukraine	4	0	1	3	3	6	−3	0.00
United States	2	0	0	2	1	3	−2	0.00
Uruguay	2	0	0	2	1	8	−7	0.00
Wales	16	4	5	7	14	25	−11	25.00
Yemen	1	0	1	0	0	0	+0	0.00
Total	839	222	171	446	991	1,719	−728	26.46

== Honours ==
=== Regional ===
- Baltic Cup
  - (silver) Runners-up (1): 2012
  - (bronze) Third-place (1): 2014
- Nordic Football Championship
  - (gold) Champions (1): 2000–01
  - (bronze) Third place (1): 1964–67

=== Friendly ===
- King's Cup
  - (silver) Runners-up (2): 2000, 2013
- Cyprus International Football Tournament
  - (gold) Champions (1): 2005
- FIFA Series
  - (gold) Champions (1): 2026

== See also ==
- Finland men's national under-21 football team
- Finland men's national under-19 football team
- Finland men's national under-18 football team
- Finland men's national under-17 football team
- Finland men's national under-16 football team
- Finland women's national football team
- Finland women's national under-20 football team
- Finland women's national under-17 football team
- Football in Finland
- Finnish "Workers" football team
- Åland official football team
- Sápmi football team
