= 2012 Baltic Cup =

Football club tournament held between the top clubs from Baltic states

Tournament details
- Host country: Estonia
- Dates: 1–3 June
- Teams: 4
- Venues: 2 (in 2 host cities)

Final positions
- Champions: Latvia (10th title)
- Runners-up: Finland
- Third place: Estonia
- Fourth place: Lithuania

Tournament statistics
- Matches played: 4
- Goals scored: 11 (2.75 per match)
- Attendance: 3,974 (994 per match)
- Top scorer: (Latvia) Edgars Gauračs (3 goals)

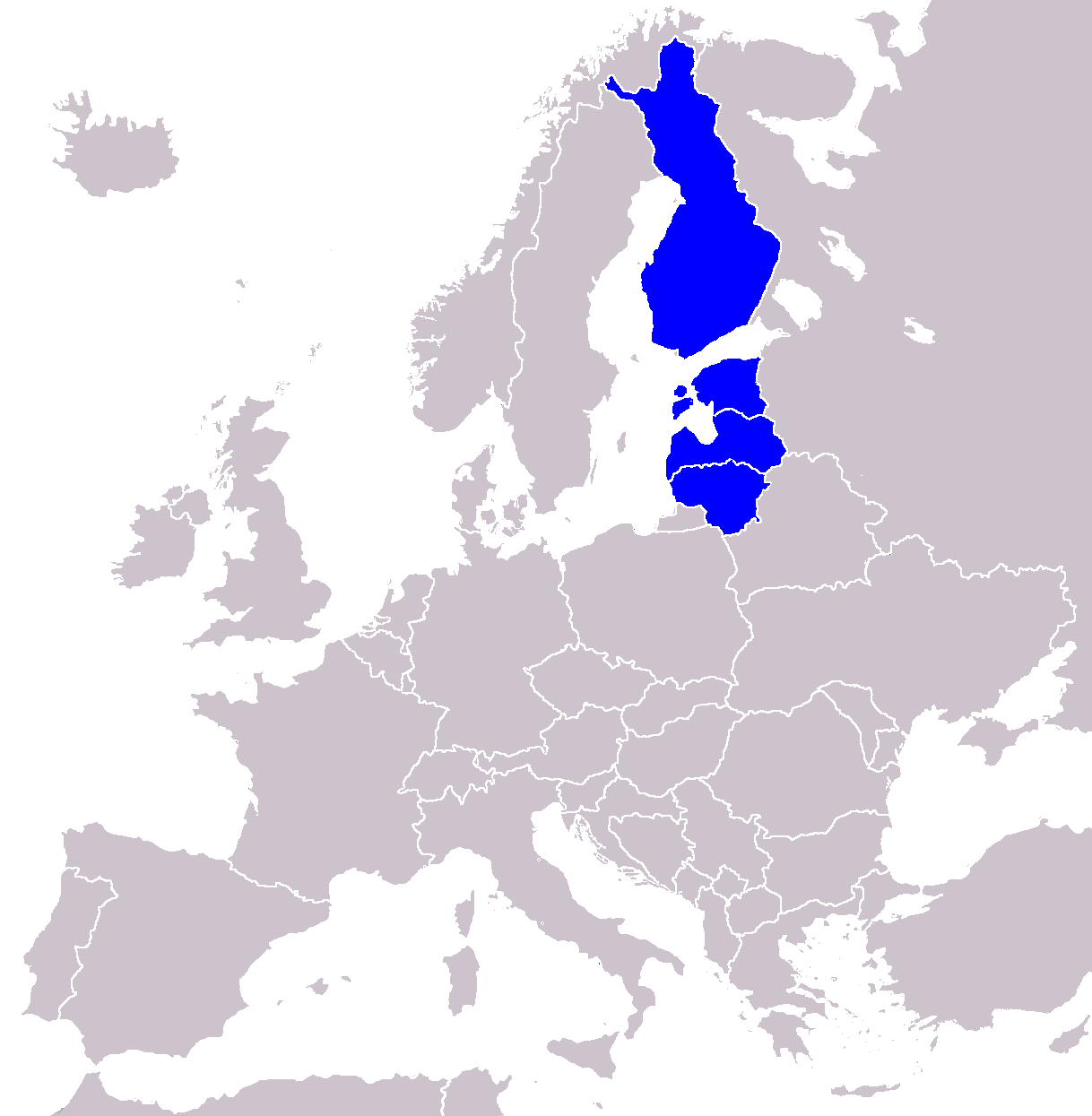
A map highlighting the Baltic states and Finland

The 2012 Baltic Cup was a football competition which was held on 1–3 June 2012 in Estonia.

== Format ==
For the first time, Finland took part in the competition. As a result of this, the round-robin format was changed to knock-out tournament, as Latvia did not agree to play more than two matches. As a result of this, penalty shoot-outs were used to decide the winner if a match was drawn after 90 minutes.

== Stadiums ==
Tamme Stadium in Tartu was used for the matches involving Estonia and Võru Stadium in Võru was the host for the other two matches. Tehvandi Stadium in Otepää and Viljandi linnastaadion in Viljandi were also to be used, but were unavailable for the time period.

== Results ==
Semi-finals
1 June
Latvia	5
Lithuania	0
1 June
Estonia	1
Finland	2

Final
3 June
Latvia (p)	1 (6)
Finland	1 (5)
Third place
3 June
Estonia	1
Lithuania	0

== Matches ==
=== Semi-finals ===
1 June 2012
17:30 UTC+3

Latvia	5–0	Lithuania
Cauņa 12' (pen.); Gauračs 17', 48'; Višņakovs 35'; Smirnovs 80'	Report

Võru Stadium, Võru
Attendance: 130
Referee: Mattias Gestranius (Finland)
1 June 2012
20:30 UTC+3

Estonia	1–2	Finland
Oper 33'	Report	Kuqi 10', 22'

Tamme Stadium, Tartu
Attendance: 2,470
Referee: Vadims Direktorenko (Latvia)

=== Third place match ===
3 June 2012
16:30 UTC+3

Estonia	1–0	Lithuania
Voskoboinikov 18'	Report

Tamme Stadium, Tartu
Attendance: 1,094
Referee: Hannes Kaasik (Estonia)

=== Final ===
3 June 2012
13:30 UTC+3

Finland	1–1	Latvia
Kolehmainen 52'	Report	Gauračs 54'
Penalties
Pukki (penalty missed); Sjölund (penalty scored); Kuqi (penalty scored); Ojala (penalty scored); Pasanen (penalty scored); Sparv (penalty scored); Hurme (penalty missed); Kolehmainen (penalty missed)	5–6	(penalty missed) Cauņa; (penalty scored) Smirnovs; (penalty scored) Laizāns; (penalty scored) Kamešs; (penalty scored) Zjuzins; (penalty scored) Kļava; (penalty missed) Bulvītis; (penalty scored) Kozlovs

Võru Stadium, Võru
Attendance: 280
Referee: Gediminas Mažeika (Lithuanian)

== Winners ==
2012 Baltic Football Cup winners

Latvia
Tenth title

== Statistics ==
=== Goalscorers ===
There were 11 goals scored in 4 matches, for an average of 2.75 goals per match.

3 goals

- (Latvia) Edgars Gauračs

2 goals

- (Finland) Njazi Kuqi

1 goal

- (Estonia) Andres Oper
- (Estonia) Vladimir Voskoboinikov
- (Finland) Toni Kolehmainen
- (Latvia) Aleksandrs Cauņa
- (Latvia) Aleksejs Višņakovs
- (Latvia) Vitālijs Smirnovs

== See also ==
Balkan Cup
Nordic Football Championship
