= Ari Lahti =

Finnish businessman

President of Football Association of Finland
- Incumbent
- Assumed office 2018
- Preceded by: Markku Lehtola (interim)

Personal details
- Born: Ari Lahti; 15 March 1963 (age 63) Leppävirta, Finland
- Occupation: Executive; Football administrator Investor

Ari Juhani Lahti (born 1963) is a Finnish businessman, owner of KuPS of the Veikkausliiga and President of Football Association of Finland. He is the founder, owner, and chairman of Helsinki-based Ice Capital. He was formerly employed at the Bank of Finland, and was born in Leppävirta.
