= List of shipwrecks in the 1740s =

The list of shipwrecks in the 1740s includes some ships sunk, wrecked or otherwise lost during the 1740s.

== 1740 ==
1740 began on March 25.^{[Note 1]}

=== May ===
==== 1 May ====
List of shipwrecks: 1 May 1740
Ship	State	Description
John & Mary	Great Britain	The ship was driven ashore and wrecked at Bray Head, County Wicklow, Ireland. Her crew survived.

==== 24 May ====
List of shipwrecks: 24 May 1740
Ship	State	Description
Amsterdam-Galey (Амстердам-Галей)	Imperial Russian Navy	The frigate was driven ashore and wrecked at Greifswalder Oie with the loss of three of her crew. She was on a voyage from Reval to Arkhangelsk.

=== January ===
==== 9 January ====
List of shipwrecks: 9 January 1740
Ship	State	Description
Rooswijk	Dutch East India Company	The East Indiaman was wrecked on the Goodwin Sands, Kent, Great Britain, with the loss of all hands.

==== 23 January ====
List of shipwrecks: 23 January 1740
Ship	State	Description
Fane	Great Britain	The ship was driven ashore and wrecked at Dover, Kent. Her crew were rescued. She was on a voyage from Bristol, England, to Amsterdam, North Holland, Dutch Republic.

==== 26 January ====
List of shipwrecks: 26 January 1740
Ship	State	Description
Pearl	Great Britain	The ship was wrecked on the Steeple Rocks, in the North Sea off Tinmouth, Northumberland, with the loss of eight of her thirteen crew.

==== Unknown date ====
List of shipwrecks: January 1740
Ship	State	Description
Adriatick	Great Britain	The ship was wrecked on the coast of Carolina, British America. She was on a voyage from London to Virginia, British America
Elizabeth	Great Britain	The ship was lost on the coast of Jutland. She was on a voyage from a Norwegian port to King's Lynn, Norfolk.
Endeavour	Great Britain	The ship was lost near Mahón, Menorca. She was on a voyage from Newfoundland, British America, to Livorno, Grand Duchy of Tuscany.
Friendship	Great Britain	The ship was lost near Great Yarmouth, Norfolk. She was on a voyage from Porto, Portugal, to Great Yarmouth,
Gothick Lyon	Unknown	The ship was attacked off Thoulon, Var, France, by two Spanish privateers. She exploded with the loss on all on board. Gothick Lyon was on a voyage from Livorno to Marseille, Bouches-du-Rhône, France.
Joseph & Elizabeth	Great Britain	The ship foundered in the Atlantic Ocean 14 leagues (42 nautical miles (78 km)) off St. Ives, Cornwall. Her crew were rescued. She was on a voyage from London to Bridgwater, Somerset.
Lady Jacoba	Hamburg	The ship foundered in the Bay of Biscay. She was on a voyage from Málaga, Spain, to Hamburg.
Mary & Betty	Great Britain	The ship was wrecked on the coast of Lancashire. She was on a voyage from Carolina, British America, to Liverpool, Lancashire.
Prince of Asturias	Great Britain	The ship was lost on the coast of Portugal. She was on a voyage from Newcastle upon Tyne, Northumberland, to Porto, Portugal.
Sea Horse	Great Britain	The ship was wrecked on the Dutch coast. She was on a voyage from Boston, Lincolnshire, to a Dutch port.
Tryumph	Great Britain	The ship was driven ashore and wrecked at Swansea, Glamorgan. She was on a voyage from Maryland, British America, to London.
William	Great Britain	The ship foundered in Carnarvon Bay. She was on a voyage from Virginia, British America, to Liverpool.

=== February ===
==== 8 February ====
List of shipwrecks: 8 February 1740
Ship	State	Description
Britannia	Great Britain	The ship foundered off Jamaica. She was on a voyage from Jamaica to London.
St Joseph	Great Britain	The snow sprang a leak in the Atlantic Ocean 500 leagues (1,500 nautical miles (2,800 km)) west of Land's End, Cornwall, and was abandoned. Her crew were rescued. She was on a voyage from Liverpool, Lancashire, to Virginia, British America.

==== Unknown date ====
List of shipwrecks: February 1740
Ship	State	Description
Britannia	Great Britain	The ship was driven ashore at "Beerhaven", Ireland. She was on a voyage from New York to Bristol, Gloucestershire.
Isabel	Great Britain	The ship was lost near Penzance, Cornwall, before 23 February.
Pearle	Great Britain	The ship was driven ashore and wrecked north of Newcastle upon Tyne, Northumberland, before 10 February with the loss of six of her crew. She was on a voyage from London to Newcastle upon Tyne.

=== March ===
==== 13 March ====
List of shipwrecks: 13 March 1740
Ship	State	Description
Content	Great Britain	The ship was wrecked on the Long Sand, in the North Sea off the coast of Essex. Her crew were rescued.

=== August ===
==== 13 August ====
List of shipwrecks: 13 August 1740
Ship	State	Description
Yakutsk (Якутск)	Imperial Russian Navy	The dubel boat was nipped, holed, and subsequently carried away by ice in the Khatanga Gulf. The crew abandoned ship on 14 August and made it to land across the ice by 16 August.

==== Unknown date ====
List of shipwrecks: Unknown date in March 1740
Ship	State	Description
Esther	Great Britain	The collier foundered in the North Sea off Lowestoft, Suffolk, before 3 March. She was on a voyage from South Shields, County Durham, to London.

=== September ===
==== 27 September ====
List of shipwrecks: 27 September 1740
Ship	State	Description
Novy Kuryer (Новый курьер, 'New Courier')	Imperial Russian Navy	The packet ship ran aground on a reef off the island of Keri. She was abandoned by her crew the next day and wrecked. She was on a voyage from Lübeck to Kronstadt and had changed course to Reval to escape a storm.

==== Unknown date ====
List of shipwrecks: Unknown date in 1740
Ship	State	Description
Lambert	Great Britain	The ship was wrecked on the coast of Africa with the loss of all but one of her crew.
Nuestra Señora del Pillary y San Antonio	Spain	The ship was lost off Puerto Rico. Her crew were rescued. She was on a voyage from Maraicaho, Puerto Rico, to Cádiz, Spain.

=== November ===
==== 18 November ====
List of shipwrecks: 18 November 1740
Ship	State	Description
Suecia	(Sweden) Swedish East India Company	East Indiaman shipwrecked off North Ronaldsay on her return sailing from Bengal to Gothenburg. Thirteen survivors.

=== Unknown date ===
List of shipwrecks: Unknown date in 1740
Ship	State	Description
Unnamed	Imperial Russian Navy	The dubel boat was wrecked off ru:Maly Island in the Gulf of Finland.

== 1741 ==
=== February ===
==== 12 February ====
List of shipwrecks: 12 February 1741
Ship	State	Description
La Gailarde	France	The tartane foundered at San Salvador de Cuba.

=== March ===
==== 26 March ====
List of shipwrecks: 26 March 1741
Ship	State	Description
St. John Baptist	Great Britain	The ship was wrecked on the coast of Sardinia. She was on a voyage from Alexandria, Egypt, to Livorno, Grand Duchy of Tuscany.

=== April ===
==== 24 April ====
List of shipwrecks: 24 April 1741
Ship	State	Description
Anna	Great Britain	George Anson's voyage around the world The pink was damaged in a storm and put into a cove that was later to be called Bahía Anna Pink, after the ship. After two months she was repaired sufficiently to sail to the Juan Fernández Islands, where she was broken up in August 1741.

==== Unknown date ====
List of shipwrecks: Unknown date in April 1741
Ship	State	Description
Anguilla	Great Britain	The ship was driven ashore at New Romney, Kent. Her cargo of lime got wet when the ship started to break up on 26 April and the ship was consequently destroyed by fire. She was on a voyage from London to Saint Kitts.
Hamburg Merchant	Great Britain	The ship foundered in the North Sea off the mouth of the Hunmber She was on a voyage from South Shields, County Durham, to London.
Two Brothers	Great Britain	The ship foundered in the English Channel off Arundell, Sussex, before 27 April.
Warwick	Great Britain	The ship foundered in the North Sea off Cromer, Norfolk, with the loss of all hands.

=== May ===
==== 9 May ====
List of shipwrecks: 9 May 1741
Ship	State	Description
Barbadoes Merchant	Great Britain	The ship was destroyed by fire at Bristol, Gloucestershire.

==== 12 May ====
List of shipwrecks: 12 May 1741
Ship	State	Description
Favoritka (Фаворитка, 'Favourite')	Imperial Russian Navy	The snow sprang a heavy leak and was deliberately beached at the island of sv:Torsön in the Bothnian Bay to save the crew. While sustaining damage, she was refloated later in May and taken to Kronstadt for repairs.

==== 14 May ====
List of shipwrecks: 14 May 1741
Ship	State	Description
HMS Wager	(Kingdom of Great Britain) Royal Navy	HMS Wager. George Anson's voyage around the world / Wager Mutiny: The sixth rate was wrecked on rocks at 47°40′43″S 75°2′57″W, on what would later be called Wager Island, and was then part of the Viceroyalty of Peru. Of her crew of about 300, only ten were to return to England.

==== Unknown date ====
List of shipwrecks: Unknown date in May 1741
Ship	State	Description
Anna Maria Margaretta	Dutch Republic	The ship was wrecked on the Goodwin Sands, Kent, Great Britain. Her crew were rescued. She was on a voyage from Rotterdam, South Holland, to Fécamp, Seine-Maritime, France
Charming Molly	Great Britain	The ship foundered whilst on a voyage from the north of England to Bristol, Gloucestershire.
Galera Sevillia	Spain	The ship foundered in the Atlantic Ocean 80 leagues (240 nautical miles (440 km)) north east of Porto Santo Island, Madeira, Portugal. Her crew survived. She was on a voyage from Amsterdam, North Holland, Dutch Republic, to Cádiz.
John & Ann	Great Britain	The ship was wrecked on Skagen, Denmark. She was on a voyage from Hull, Yorkshire, to Riga, Russia.
Leghorn	Great Britain	The ship was wrecked on Skagen. She was on a voyage from Gottenburg, Sweden, to Chester, Cheshire.
Mary	Great Britain	The ship was lost near Riga. She was on a voyage from London to Riga.
Nelly	Great Britain	The ship foundered in the North Sea off Eyemouth, Berwickshire, with some loss of life.
Succession	Great Britain	The ship was wrecked on the Rocks of Tara, north of the mouth of the Strangford River, County Down, Ireland.

=== June ===
==== 17 June ====
List of shipwrecks: 17 June 1741
Ship	State	Description
Jennison	Great Britain	The ship was wrecked on Gotland, Sweden. Her crew were rescued. She was on a voyage from Newcastle upon Tyne, Northumberland, to Saint Petersburg, Russia.

==== 30 June ====
List of shipwrecks: 30 June 1741
Ship	State	Description
Invencible	Spain	The ship was set on fire by lightning and exploded at Havana. Ten crewmembers were killed and at least five civilians on land were killed by fire and debris.

=== July ===
==== 5 July ====
List of shipwrecks: 5 July 1741
Ship	State	Description
Providence	Great Britain	The ship was lost off Narva, Russia. She was on a voyage from Narva to London.

==== 25 July ====
List of shipwrecks: 25 July 1741
Ship	State	Description
Thomas & Mary	Great Britain	The ship was lost off Narva, Russia. She was on a voyage from Narva to London.

==== Unknown date ====
List of shipwrecks: Unknown date in July 1741
Ship	State	Description
Veare	Great Britain	The transport ship, a pink, was wrecked on the Port Mourant Keys, off the coast of Jamaica in early July.

=== August ===
==== 15 August ====
List of shipwrecks: 15 August 1741
Ship	State	Description
Emanuel	Sweden	The ship was lost on the South Wall Sand, in the North Sea off Texel, North Holland, Dutch Republic. She was on a voyage from Gottenburg to a French port.

=== September ===
==== 8 September ====
List of shipwrecks: 8 September 1741
Ship	State	Description
Speedwel	Ireland	The ship foundered in the Atlantic Ocean. Her crew were rescued by William (Great Britain). She was on a voyage from Barbados to Dublin.

==== 15 September ====
List of shipwrecks: 15 September 1741
Ship	State	Description
Portland	Great Britain	The ship foundered in the Atlantic Ocean. She was on a voyage from Virginia, British America, to London.

==== Unknown date ====
List of shipwrecks: Unknown date in September 1741
Ship	State	Description
Cleverland	Great Britain	The ship was driven ashore and wrecked near Stranford, County Down, Ireland, before 18 September. She was on a voyage from a port in the north of England to Liverpool, Lancashire.
Leather	Great Britain	The ship was driven ashore and wrecked near Stranford before 18 September. She was on a voyage from Bristol, Gloucestershire, to Lancaster, Lancashire.
Liverpool Merchant	Great Britain	The ship was lost at the mouth of the River Thames before 8 September. She was on a voyage from Liverpool to London.
Mary	Great Britain	The ship was driven ashore and wrecked near Stranford before 18 September. She was on a voyage from Lancaster to Barbados.

=== October ===
==== 3 October ====
List of shipwrecks: 3 October 1741
Ship	State	Description
Petergof (Петергоф)	Imperial Russian Navy	The fluyt was wrecked at Kronstadt.

==== 21 October ====
List of shipwrecks: 21 October 1741
Ship	State	Description
Mary & Ann	Ireland	The ship was captured by Spanish privateers 60 leagues (180 nautical miles (330 km)) west of Ireland. She was subsequently run ashore and wrecked about 6 nautical miles (11 km) from "Nottam". Mary & Ann was on a voyage from Dublin to Faro, Portugal.

==== Unknown date ====
List of shipwrecks: October 1741
Ship	State	Description
Charm	Great Britain	The ship was driven ashore in the Orkney Islands before 27 October.

=== November ===
==== 26 November ====
List of shipwrecks: 26 November 1741
Ship	State	Description
Betty	Great Britain	The ship foundered in the English Channel off St. Michael's Mount, Cornwall. She was on a voyage from Maryland, British America, to London.

==== 28 November ====
List of shipwrecks: 28 November 1741
Ship	State	Description
Svyatoy Pyotr (Святой Пётр, 'St. Peter')	Imperial Russian Navy	Second Kamchatka Expedition: The packet ship was driven ashore and wrecked on Bering Island (named after the ship's commander Vitus Bering) whilst her crew were ashore. A namesake boat was built from the wreckage in 1742 and surviving crew sailed to Avacha Bay in her.

==== Unknown date ====
List of shipwrecks: Unknown date in November 1741
Ship	State	Description
Dorothy & Betty	Great Britain	The ship foundered in the North Sea off Great Yarmouth, Norfolk, before 6 November. She was on a voyage from Stockholm, Sweden, to London.
Expedition	Great Britain	The ship was driven ashore near Boulogne, Pas-de-Calais, France. She was on a voyage from Messina, Sicily, to London.
Fortune	Great Britain	The ship was lost near Calais, France. She was on a voyage from Great Yarmouth to Livorno, Grand Duchy of Tuscany.
George	Great Britain	The ship foundered in the English Channel off Dungeness, Kent, before 27 November. Her crew were rescued. She was on a voyage from Sunderland, County Durham, to Southampton, Hampshire.
Greenwich	Great Britain	The ship foundered in the English Channel off Beachy Head, Sussex, before 1 December. She was on a voyage from Jamaica to London.
La Thereisvicaute	France	The sloop was lost at Cowes, Isle of Wight, Great Britain, before 27 November with the loss of a crew member. She was on a voyage from the Île d'Arz, Morbihan to Dunkirk, Nord.
Lisbon Merchant	Great Britain	The ship was wrecked on the west coast of Ireland before 1 December. She was on a voyage from London to Limerick.
Mary	Great Britain	The ship foundered in the Bristol Channel before 1 December. She was on a voyage from London to an Irish port.
Mary	Great Britain	The ship ran aground off Porto, Portugal. She was on a voyage from Hull, Yorkshire, to Porto.
Michael	Great Britain	The ship foundered in the North Sea off Great Yarmouth before 10 November. She was on a voyage from Newcastle upon Tyne, Northumberland, to London.
Prosperous	Great Britain	The ship foundered in the North Sea off Great Yarmouth before 13 November.
Reliance	Great Britain	The ship foundered in the North Sea off Great Yarmouth before 13 November.

=== December ===
==== Unknown date ====
List of shipwrecks: December 1741
Ship	State	Description
Squirrel	Great Britain	The ship foundered before 8 December. She was on a voyage from Hull, Yorkshire, to Bristol, Gloucestershire.

=== Unknown date ===
List of shipwrecks: Unknown date in 1741
Ship	State	Description
Adventure	(Kingdom of Great Britain) British America	The ship was lost before 26 May whilst on a voyage from Carolina to Boston, Massachusetts.
Cheshire	(Kingdom of Great Britain) British America	The ship was lost whilst on a voyage from Jamaica to Philadelphia, Pennsylvania.
Crown	Great Britain	The ship was sunk by ice off Newfoundland, British America, before 7 July. Her crew survived.
El Conquistador	Spanish Navy	Battle of Cartagena de Indias: The warship was scuttled as a blockship at Cartagena de Indias, Viceroyalty of Peru.
Hoylin	Great Britain	The ship was lost near Carolina before 19 June. She was on a voyage from Bristol, Gloucestershire, to Carolina.
Joseph & Elizabeth	Great Britain	The ship was sunk by ice off Newfoundland before 7 July. Her crew survived.
London	Great Britain	The ship was destroyed by fire at Old Harbour, Jamaica, before 27 October.
Mary	Great Britain	The ship foundered before 22 May whilst on a voyage from London to Carthagena, Spain.
Mercury	Great Britain	The ship was lost near the mouth of the Delaware River, British America. She was on a voyage from Philadelphia, Pennsylvania, British America, to Lisbon, Portugal.
Murdock	Great Britain	The ship was driven ashore on the coast of Virginia, British America, before 14 April. She was on a voyage from London to Virginia.
Nassaw	Great Britain	The ship was lost on the Martins before 16 October. Her crew were rescued. She was on a voyage from Jamaica to Bristol.
Providence	Great Britain	The ship foundered before 22 May whilst on a voyage from Lisbon to Danzig. Her crew were rescued by the Eagle Packet Great Britain).
Rebecca and Martha	Ireland	The ship was lost near Saint Kitts before 25 September. She was on a voyage from Cork to Saint Kitts.
Sea-Nymph	Ireland	The ship was driven ashore and wrecked on Hog Island, Virginia, before 21 August. She was on a voyage from Waterford to Virginia
Streeftkerken	Dutch Republic	The ship was lost off Ceylon before 7 July.
Success	Great Britain	The ship was lost off Carolina before 1 December She was on a voyage from Carolina to London.
Woodford	Great Britain	The ship was wrecked on the coast of Carolina, British America, before 24 April. She was on a voyage from Jamaica to London.

== 1742 ==
=== April ===
==== 16 April ====
List of shipwrecks: 16 April 1742
Ship	State	Description
HMS Saltash	Royal Navy	The sloop-of-war ran aground in Cádiz Bay whilst pursuing a Spanish polacca. She was burnt by her crew on 18 April

=== June ===
==== Unknown date ====
List of shipwrecks: Unknown date in June 1742
Ship	State	Description
Blagopoluchiye (Благополучие, 'Prosperity')	Imperial Russian Navy	The ship of the line ran aground while crossing the river mouth bar of the Northern Dvina. She was refloated and taken back to Arkhangelsk for repairs.

=== July ===
==== 29 July ====
List of shipwrecks: 29 July 1742
Ship	State	Description
Gektor (Гектор, 'Hector')	Imperial Russian Navy	The frigate was wrecked on a reef off Gotland. Her crew were rescued.

=== September ===
==== 2 September ====
List of shipwrecks: 2 September 1742
Ship	State	Description
Westerbeek	Dutch East India Company	The East Indiaman was wrecked on Suðuroy, Faroe Islands with the loss of one of her 81 crew.

==== 19 September ====
List of shipwrecks: 19 September 1742
Ship	State	Description
Horstendaal	Dutch East India Company	During her first return voyage from Batavia, she stranded on 19 September 1742. The crew and most of the cargo was rescued. After the ship was refloated in October, she wrecked a few days later at the Scheldt estuary, Dutch Republic, on 15 October 1742 at Buizengat, between Callantsoog and Huisduinen.

==== 22 September ====
List of shipwrecks: 22 September 1742
Ship	State	Description
Oude Zijpe	Dutch East India Company	Oude Zijpe During the last part of her first return voyage from Batavia, she ran aground during a heavy storm off Bloemendaal, 0.5 mile north of Zandvoort. The crew and most of the cargo was rescued.

==== Unknown date ====
List of shipwrecks: Unknown date in September 1742
Ship	State	Description
Dagerort (Дагерорт)	Imperial Russian Navy	The fluyt ran aground and sank in Kola Bay. Her crew were rescued. She was on a voyage from Arkhangelsk to Ekaterininskaya Bay.

=== November ===
==== 22 November ====
List of shipwrecks: 22 November 1742
Ship	State	Description
HMS Drake	(Kingdom of Great Britain) Royal Navy	The Drake-class sloop was wrecked at Gibraltar.

=== December ===
==== 25 December ====
List of shipwrecks: 25 December 1742
Ship	State	Description
Royal Louis	Kingdom of France	The first rate ship of the line was destroyed by fire at Brest when in an advanced state of construction. Sabotage was suspected as the cause.

=== January ===
==== 11 January ====
List of shipwrecks: 11 January 1742
Ship	State	Description
HMS Tyger	(Kingdom of Great Britain) Royal Navy	The fourth rate frigate was wrecked in the Dry Tortugas.

=== Unknown date ===
List of shipwrecks: 1742
Ship	State	Description
HMS Tilbury	(Kingdom of Great Britain) Royal Navy	The fourth rate ship of the line was destroyed by fire.

== 1743 ==
=== March ===
==== Unknown date ====
List of shipwrecks: Unknown date in March 1743
Ship	State	Description
Chepura (Чепура)	Imperial Russian Navy	The smack was sunk by ice at the mouth of the Volga.
Lebed (Лебедь, 'Swan')	Imperial Russian Navy	The smack was sunk by ice at the mouth of the Volga.

=== April ===
==== 13 April ====
List of shipwrecks: 13 April 1743
Ship	State	Description
Princess Louisa	British East India Company	The East Indiaman was wrecked off Maio Island, Cape Verde Islands with the loss of 59 of her 100 crew.

=== June ===
==== 15 June ====
List of shipwrecks: 15 June 1743
Ship	State	Description
Arkhangel Mikhail (Архангел Михаил, 'Archangel Michael')	Imperial Russian Navy	The fluyt ran aground at the river mouth bar of the Northern Dvina and was damaged.
Nargin (Наргин, 'Nargen')	Imperial Russian Navy	The fluyt ran aground at the river mouth bar of the Northern Dvina and sank.

=== July ===
==== 13 July ====
List of shipwrecks: 13 July 1743
Ship	State	Description
Hollandia	Dutch East India Company	The East Indiaman struck the Gunner Rock, off Annet, Isles of Scilly, Great Britain, and sank with the loss of all 276 crew.

=== September ===
==== 13 September ====
List of shipwrecks: 13 September 1743
Ship	State	Description
Merkurius (Меркуриус, 'Mercurius')	Imperial Russian Navy	The frigate ran aground off Anholt, Denmark and was wrecked. Her crew were rescued. She was on a voyage from Arkhangelsk to the Baltic Sea.

==== 18 September ====
List of shipwrecks: 18 September 1743
Ship	State	Description
HMS Bridgewater	(Kingdom of Great Britain) Royal Navy	The sixth rate was wrecked in St. Mary's Bay, Newfoundland, British America.

=== October ===
==== 5 October ====
List of shipwrecks: 5 October 1743
Ship	State	Description
Gogland (Гогланд)	Imperial Russian Navy	The galiot ran aground on a reef off Hamina, Grand Duchy of Finland and was wrecked. She was on a voyage from Kronstadt to Stockholm, Sweden.

=== December ===
==== 28 December ====
List of shipwrecks: 28 December 1743
Ship	State	Description
Parsey	Great Britain	The ship was lost off the Bahamas. She was on a voyage from London to Philadelphia, Pennsylvania, British America.

==== Unknown date ====
List of shipwrecks: 1743
Ship	State	Description
Adventure	Great Britain	The ship was driven ashore and severely damaged at Margate, Kent, before 3 January. She was on a voyage from Carolina, British America, to London.
Nancy	Great Britain	The ship was driven ashore in the Isles of Scilly before 3 January. She was on a voyage from Londonderry to London.

=== January ===
==== 6 January ====
List of shipwrecks: 6 January 1743
Ship	State	Description
Begona	Spain	A privateer, a snow, attacked Bacchus (Great Britain), which sank her. Thirty of her 120 crew were rescued.

==== Unknown date ====
List of shipwrecks: January 1743
Ship	State	Description
Dolphin	Great Britain	The ship was driven ashore and wrecked between Cascais and St. Julian's Castle, Portugal. She was on a voyage from Newcastle upon Tyne, Northumberland, to Porto, Portugal.
Experiment	(Kingdom of Great Britain) British America	The ship was driven ashore at Porto before 20 January. She was on a voyage from Carolina to Porto. Experiment had been refloated by 23 February.
James	Great Britain	The ship was driven ashore and wrecked between Cascais as St. Julian's Castle. She was on a voyage from Newcastle upon Tyne to Porto.
John & Esther	Great Britain	The ship was wrecked on the Norwegian coast. She was on a voyage from Gottenburg, Sweden, to London.
John & Hannah	Great Britain	The ship was driven ashore on Spurn Point, Yorkshire, before 17 January. She was on a voyage from Riga to Plimouth, Devon. She had been refloated by 27 January.
Martha	Great Britain	The ship was wrecked on the north coast of Scotland before 10 January. Her crew were rescued. She was on a voyage from Jamaica to Lancaster, Lancashire.
Mary	Ireland	The ship was lost near Calais, France. She was on a voyage from Rotterdam, South Holland, Dutch Republic, to Waterford.
Robert & Barbara	Great Britain	The ship was lost in the Vlie. She was on a voyage from King's Lynn, Norfolk, to Amsterdam, North Holland, Dutch Republic.

=== February ===
==== 14 February ====
List of shipwrecks: 14 February 1743
Ship	State	Description
Elizabeth	Great Britain	The ship foundered in the North Sea off Southwold, Suffolk, with the loss of all hands. She was on a voyage from Newcastle upon Tyne, Northumberland, to Dunkirk, Nord, France.

==== 19 February ====
List of shipwrecks: 19 February 1743
Ship	State	Description
Happy Return	Great Britain	The ship foundered in Bigbury Bay. She was on a voyage from London to Plimouth.

==== 25 February ====
List of shipwrecks: 25 February 1743
Ship	State	Description
Carolina	Great Britain	The ship was wrecked on the Goodwin Sands, Kent, with the loss of her captain and some of her crew.
Charming Nancey	Great Britain	The ship was driven ashore at Margate, Kent.
Crookendon	Great Britain	The ship was driven ashore between Deal and Sandwich, Kent.
Chariot	Great Britain	The ship was driven ashore at Margate.
Dolphin	Great Britain	The ship was driven ashore on the east Kent coast. She was on a voyage from Gibraltar to London.
Eastern-Branch	Great Britain	The ship was driven ashore at Margate.
Genoa	Great Britain	The ship was wrecked on the Goodwin Sands with the loss of her captain and some of her crew.
Globe	Great Britain	The ship was driven ashore between Deal and Sandwich. Her crew were rescued. She was on a voyage from London to Dublin and Jamaica.
Industry	Great Britain	The ship was driven ashore between Deal and Sandwich. Her crew were rescued. She was on a voyage from London to Virginia, British America.
Jennet	Great Britain	The ship was lost in The Downs. Her crew were rescued. She was on a voyage from London to Barbados
Mary	Great Britain	The ship was driven ashore between Deal and Sandwich. Her crew were rescued. She was on a voyage from London to Carolina, British America.
Nottingham	Great Britain	The ship was lost near Broadstere, Kent.
Oxford	Great Britain	The ship was wrecked on the Goodwin Sands with the loss of her captain and some of her crew.
Recovery	Great Britain	The ship was lost in The Downs. Her crew were rescued. She was on a voyage from London to Barnstaple, Devon.
Success	Great Britain	The ship was driven ashore and wrecked at Sandown Castle, Kent. Her crew were rescued. She was on a voyage from London to Lancaster, Lancashire.
William & Sarah	Great Britain	The ship was driven ashore on between Deal and Sandwich. Her crew were rescued. She was on a voyage from London to Carolina. William & Sarah had been refloated by 2 March.

==== 28 February ====
List of shipwrecks: 28 February 1743
Ship	State	Description
Grantham	Great Britain	The ship foundered in the English Channel off Folkston, Kent, with the loss of a crew member. She was on a voyage from Bencoolen, India, to London.
Providence	Ireland	The ship was lost near Carnarvan. She was on a voyage from Faro, Portugal, to Dublin.

==== Unknown date ====
List of shipwrecks: Unknown date in February 1743
Ship	State	Description
Hope	Great Britain	The ship was driven ashore near Harwich, Essex, before 7 February. She was on a voyage from London to Hamburg.
Maria	France	The ship was driven ashore in Sandown Bay before 21 February. She was on a voyage from Bayonne, Pyrénées-Atlantiques to Le Havre, Seine-Maritime.
Martha	Great Britain	The ship foundered in Barnstaple Bay. She was on a voyage from Carolina, British America, to Bristol, Gloucestershire.
Santa Antonio Depadua	Spain	The ship was driven ashore near Lydd, Kent, Great Britain, before 10 February. She was on a voyage from Dunkirk, Nord, France, to Cádiz.

=== March ===
==== 13 March ====
List of shipwrecks: 13 March 1743
Ship	State	Description
Betty	Great Britain	The ship capsized and sank off Anamaboe, Gold Coast. Although there were some survivors, over 200 people died.
Santa Dominick	Spain	The wherry was driven ashore and wrecked near Sandown Castle, Kent, Great Britain. She was on a voyage from Málaga to Dunkirk, Nord, France.

==== Unknown date ====
List of shipwrecks: Unknown date in March 1743
Ship	State	Description
Hopewell	Great Britain	The ship was lost on the South Bull, in the Irish Sea off Dublin, Kingdom of Ireland. She was on a voyage from Bristol, Gloucestershire, to Chester, Cheshire.
Le Ulera	France	The ship foundered whilst on a voyage from Dunkirk, Nord to Dublin, Ireland.

=== Unknown date ===
List of shipwrecks: Unknown date in 1743
Ship	State	Description
Anne & Sarah	Great Britain	The ship was lost in Winyah Bay, British America.
HMS Astraea	(Kingdom of Great Britain) Royal Navy	The stores ship was destroyed by fire at Boston, Massachusetts, British America, before 2 March.
George	(Kingdom of Great Britain) British America	The ship was driven ashore on the coast of Carolina. She was on a voyage from Boston, Massachusetts, to a port in North Carolina.
Hooper	Great Britain	The ship sprang a leak in the Atlantic Ocean and was abandoned off the coast of Galicia, Spain, before 13 January. Her crew were rescued by Rebecca (Great Britain). Hooper was on a voyage from Porto, Portugal, to London.
Lucitannia	Great Britain	The ship was lost at Mahón, Menorca. She was on a voyage from Boston, Lincolnshire, to Genoa.
Seneca	Great Britain	The ship foundered in the Atlantic Ocean. She was on a voyage from Bristol, Gloucestershire, to Philadelphia, Pennsylvania, British America.
William & Mary	Great Britain	The ship was lost at Porto before 21 February. She was on a voyage from Newcastle upon Tyne to Porto.
Swift	(Kingdom of Great Britain) British America	The ship was lost at Porto before 9 March. She was on a voyage from a South Carolinan port to Porto.

== 1745 ==
=== January ===
==== 12 January ====
List of shipwrecks: 18 November 1740
Ship	State	Description
Drottningen af Swerige	(Sweden) Swedish East India Company	East Indiaman shipwrecked on approach to Lerwick on her way from Gothenburg to Canton. The entire crew survived.
Stockholm	(Sweden) Swedish East India Company	East Indiaman shipwrecked on approach to Lerwick on her way from Gothenburg to Canton. The entire crew survived.

=== July ===
==== 29 July ====
List of shipwrecks: 29 July 1745
Ship	State	Description
HMS Mediator	Royal Navy	The sloop-of-war sprang a leak and sank at Ostend, Dutch Republic.

=== August ===
==== 21 August ====
List of shipwrecks: 21 August 1745
Ship	State	Description
Degop (Дегоп)	Imperial Russian Navy	The smack ran aground and was wrecked off ru:Virginy Islands in the Gulf of Finland. Her crew and cargo were rescued. She was on a voyage from Reval to Kronstadt.

=== September ===
==== 12 September ====
List of shipwrecks: 12 September 1745
Ship	State	Description
Gotheborg	(Sweden) Swedish East India Company	The East Indiaman ran aground and was wrecked on the Hunnebådan Reef, in Rivö Fjord. Her crew survived. She was on a voyage from Canton, China, to Gothenburg.

=== October ===
==== 31 October ====
List of shipwrecks: 31 October 1745
Ship	State	Description
Tonein (Тонеин)	Imperial Russian Navy	The survey and buoy tender galiot ran aground off the Tolbukhin Lighthouse. Refloated the next day, was subsequently holed by ice, patched, and taken in to Kronstadt, where she arrived on 13 December.

=== November ===
==== 14 November ====
List of shipwrecks: 14 November 1745
Ship	State	Description
HMS Fox	(Kingdom of Great Britain) Royal Navy	Fox, a 20-gun frigate, foundered with all hands in a gale off Dunbar during the Jacobite rising of 1745.

==== 24 November ====
List of shipwrecks: November 1745
Ship	State	Description
Boscawen	Great Britain	The privateer, a frigate, ran aground at St. Ives, Cornwall, and was wrecked.

=== Unknown date ===
List of shipwrecks: 1745
Ship	State	Description
Het Vergulde Lam	Dutch Republic	The ship sank at Målen, Norway.

== 1746 ==
=== January ===
==== 20 January ====
List of shipwrecks: 20 January 1746
Ship	State	Description
Tygar	Great Britain	The ship was driven ashore on the coast of the Isle of Wight by a French privateer and was wrecked. She was on a voyage from Mahón, Menorca, to London.

==== Unknown date ====
List of shipwrecks: January 1746
Ship	State	Description
Merryfield	Great Britain	The ship was wrecked at Duncarn Head, Scotland, before 23 January. She was on a voyage from Newfoundland, British America, to London.

=== February ===
==== 4 February ====
List of shipwrecks: 4 February 1746
Ship	State	Description
Swift	Great Britain	The ship was lost near Wexford, Ireland. She was on a voyage from Carolina, British America, to Pool, Dorset.

==== 16 February ====
List of shipwrecks: 16 February 1746
Ship	State	Description
Loyal Mace	Great Britain	The ship was driven ashore and wrecked near Bembridge, Isle of Wight. She was on a voyage from Jamaica to London.

==== Unknown date ====
List of shipwrecks: February 1746
Ship	State	Description
Blessing	Great Britain	The ship foundered in St. George's Channel. She was on a voyage from Liverpool, Lancashire, to London.
Crown	Great Britain	The ship was lost near Dunbar, Lothian. She was on a voyage from King's Lynn, Norfolk, to Leith, Lothian.
Industry	Great Britain	The ship foundered in the North Sea with some loss of life. She was on a voyage from London to Rotterdam, South Holland, Dutch Republic.
Jane	Great Britain	The ship foundered off Fowey, Cornwall. She was on a voyage from Pool, Dorset, to Fowey.
Robert and Ruth	Great Britain	The ship was driven ashore near Hartley Poole, County Durham. She was on a voyage from Hull, Yorkshire, to Danzig.

=== June ===
==== 24 June ====
List of shipwrecks: 24 June 1747
Ship	State	Description
HMS Saltash	(Kingdom of Great Britain) Royal Navy	The sloop foundered off Beachy Head in the English Channel.

=== August ===
==== Unknown date ====
List of shipwrecks: Unknown date in August 1746
Ship	State	Description
L'Insulaire	(Kingdom of France) Compagnie des Indes	The frigate foundered.

=== September ===
==== 1 September ====
List of shipwrecks: 1 September 1746
Ship	State	Description
Hofwegen	Dutch East India Company	The fluyt was struck by lightning and exploded at Batavia, Netherlands East Indies.

==== 16 September ====
List of shipwrecks: 16 September 1746
Ship	State	Description
Novaya Dvinka (Новая Двинка)	Imperial Russian Navy	The pink was wrecked off Gotland, Sweden. Her crew were rescued. She was on a voyage from Copenhagen to Kronstadt.

=== October ===
==== 28 October ====
List of shipwrecks: 28 October 1746
Ship	State	Description
San Firmin	Spanish Navy	The corvette was driven ashore during an earthquake at Callao, Viceroyalty of Peru. She ended up 500 yards (460 m) inland.

=== December ===
==== Unknown date ====
List of shipwrecks: December 1746
Ship	State	Description
Rose	Great Britain	The ship was captured by a French privateer before 28 December. She was on a voyage from London to Aberdeen. Rose subsequently drove ashore crewless on the Norwegian coast.
Rose	Great Britain	The ship was captured by a French privateer before 23 December. She was on a voyage from Virginia, British America, to London. Rose was subsequently wrecked on the Portuguese coast.

=== Unknown date ===
List of shipwrecks: June 1747
Ship	State	Description
Alliance	Great Britain	The ship foundered in the Atlantic Ocean before 13 March. Her crew were rescued by a French ship. She was on a voyage from Jamaica to London.
Esperance	France	The ship was captured by English privateers whilst on a voyage from Bordeaux, Gironde, to Martinique. She was set afire and destroyed.
Henrietta	Great Britain	The ship foundered in the Atlantic Ocean off the American coast before 17 March.
Jolly Batchelor	Great Britain	The ship foundered in the Atlantic Ocean. Her crew were rescued. She was on a voyage from London to Jamaica.
Levant	Great Britain	The ship foundered in the Mediterranean Sea before 10 March. Her crew were rescued. She was on a voyage from London to a Turkish port.
London	Great Britain	The ship was destroyed by fire at Jamaica before 17 March.
Port Royal Packet	Great Britain	The ship foundered in the Atlantic Ocean before 24 February. Her crew survived. She was on a voyage from Carolina, British America, to London.
Prince Charles	Great Britain	The ship was driven ashore and wrecked near Livorno, Grand Duchy of Tuscany, before 17 March. She was on a voyage from Livorno to New York, British America.
Saltana	France	The privateer sprang a leak and ran aground before 13 March. She put into Baltimore, Maryland, British America, where her crew surrendered.
Shirley	Great Britain	The ship was driven ashore and wrecked on Antigua before 17 March whilst evading a French privateer.

== Notes ==
1. Until 1752, the year began on Lady Day (25 March) Thus 24 March 1740 was followed by 25 March 1741. 31 December 1741 was followed by 1 January 1741.
