= List of shipwrecks in September 1833 =

The list of shipwrecks in September 1833 includes ships sunk, foundered, grounded, or otherwise lost during September 1833.

== 1 September ==
List of shipwrecks: 1 September 1833
Ship	State	Description
Agenoria	United Kingdom	The brig was driven ashore at Wainfleet, Lincolnshire. Nine crew were rescued by rocket apparatus.
Albion	United Kingdom	The ship was driven ashore near Dunkirk, Nord, France. She was on a voyage from Sunderland, County Durham to Jersey, Channel Islands. Albion was refloated on 15 September and taken in to Dunkirk.
Alexander	Belgium	The sloop was driven ashore and wrecked at Ostend, West Flanders with the loss of eleven lives.
Ann	United Kingdom	The collier foundered in the North Sea off the coast of Suffolk. Her crew were rescued by William (United Kingdom).
Anna Maria	Hamburg	The ship was driven ashore on Terschelling, Friesland, Netherlands. She was on a voyage from Hamburg to Liverpool, Lancashire, United Kingdom.
Anna Wilhelmina	Sweden	The ship was driven ashore and wrecked west of Ostend with the loss of two of her crew. She was on a voyage from Stockholm to Paimbœuf, Loire-Atlantique, France
Argo	United Kingdom	The sloop foundered in the North Sea 2 nautical miles (3.7 km) off Cley-next-the-Sea Norfolk with the loss off all hands.
Augusta	Danzig	The ship was driven ashore at Rock Ferry, Cheshire, United Kingdom. She was on a voyage from Liverpool to Danzig.
Augustus	Netherlands	The East Indiaman was driven ashore and wrecked near Calais, France, with the loss of nineteen of her 25 crew. She was on a voyage from Surinam to Amsterdam, North Holland.
Betsey	United Kingdom	The ship was driven ashore at Westkapelle, Zeeland, Netherlands. Her crew were rescued. She was on a voyage from London to Padstow, Cornwall.
Caren	Norway	The galleass was wrecked near Calais with the loss of six of her eight crew. She was on a voyage from Bergen to Bilbao, Spain.
Chevington Oak	United Kingdom	The ship foundered off Dunkirk.
Croix du Sud	France	The whaler was driven ashore near Cherbourg, Charente-Maritime.
Cyrus	United Kingdom	The ship foundered off Guernsey, Channel Islands. Her crew were rescued by Alfred (United Kingdom). She was on a voyage from Livorno, Kingdom of Sardinia to London.
Dorothy	United Kingdom	The sloop foundered in the North Sea south of Filey, Yorkshire with the loss of all but one of her crew.
Earl of Wemyss	United Kingdom	The steam smack was driven ashore and wrecked at Brancaster, Norfolk with the loss of eleven lives. She was on a voyage from London to Leeds, Yorkshire.
Eagle	United Kingdom	The ship foundered in the North Sea off Bridlington, Yorkshire. Her crew were rescued. She was on a voyage from Stockton-on-Tees, County Durham to Rotterdam, South Holland, Netherlands.
Elizabeth	United Kingdom	The ship was driven ashore at Ostend. She was on a voyage from London to Halifax, Nova Scotia, British North America.
Elizabeth	United Kingdom	The ship foundered in the North Sea off Schiermonnikoog, Friesland.
Feronia	United Kingdom	The ship foundered in the North Sea off the north Norfolk coast with the loss of all hands.
Frederica Carolina	Denmark	The galiot was driven ashore and wrecked at Ostend. Her crew were rescued. She was on a voyage from Gothenburg, Sweden to Saint-Malo, Ille-et-Vilaine, France.
Friend's Adventure	United Kingdom	The yawl was driven ashore at Filey. Her crew were rescued.
Gale	United Kingdom	The ship was driven ashore crewless at King's Lynn, Norfolk.
George and Elizabeth	United Kingdom	The brig was wrecked on the Goodwin Sands, Kent. Her six crew survived.
Gloria Deo	(Russian Empire) Grand Duchy of Finland	The ship was driven ashore on Terschelling. She was on a voyage from Nystad to London.
Helen	United Kingdom	The sloop was driven ashore and wrecked near Calais. Her crew were rescued. She was on a voyage from Newcastle upon Tyne to Exeter, Devon.
Hilda	United Kingdom	The ship was driven ashore at Dunkirk.
Henry and Harriot	United Kingdom	The ship was driven ashore at Cley-next-the-Sea.
Hull Packet	Netherlands	The galiot was driven ashore near Skipsea, Yorkshire with the loss of five of her six crew. She was on a voyage from Antwerp, Belgium to Leith, Lothian.
Hull Packet	United Kingdom	The brig was driven ashore and wrecked at Calais. Her five crew were rescued.
Jane	United Kingdom	The ship was driven ashore near Aldbrough, Yorkshire.
Jeune Orelie	France	The ship was driven ashore at Ostend with the loss of five lives. She was on a voyage from Dunkirk to Rouen, Seine-Inférieure.
Lady Milner	United Kingdom	The ship was abandoned off the Haisborough Sands, in the North Sea off the coast of Norfolk with the loss of all but two of her crew. Survivors were rescued by Mary (United Kingdom).
Lion	United Kingdom	The fishing boat was driven ashore at Filey. Her crew were rescued
Lively	United Kingdom	The ship was driven ashore at Dunkirk.
Maria or Mary	United Kingdom	The ship was driven ashore on Terschelling. She was on a voyage from Hamburg to Liverpool.
Mary	United Kingdom	The ship was driven ashore and wrecked at Atwick, Yorkshire. Her crew were rescued.
Mary and Isabella	United Kingdom	The ship was driven ashore and wrecked at Filey with the loss of all hands.
Matilda	United Kingdom	The ship was wrecked 16 nautical miles (30 km) north of the mouth of the Senegal River, Africa. Her crew were rescued. She was on a voyage from Sierra Leone to London.
Phœnix	United Kingdom	The sloop was driven ashore at Boulogne, Pas-de-Calais, France. Her six crew were rescued. Phœnix was refloated in mid-September, arriving at Ramsgate, Kent on 17 September.
Quatre-Frères	United Kingdom	The chasse-marée was driven ashore and wrecked at Saint-Valery-sur-Somme, Somme. Her seven crew were rescued. She was on a voyage from Marennes, Charente-Maritime to Dunkirk.
Rambler	United Kingdom	The fishing boat was driven ashore at Filey. Her crew were rescued
Royal Oak	United Kingdom	The ship was driven ashore at Dunkirk.
Serino	United States	The ship was wrecked on Seal Island, Nova Scotia, British North America. Her crew were rescued. She was on a voyage from Boston, Massachusetts to Malta.
Shipwright	United Kingdom	The ship was abandoned in the North Sea. She was on a voyage from Sunderland to Maldon, Essex. Shipwright was subsequently towed in to Great Yarmouth.
Sovereign	United Kingdom	The ship was driven ashore and wrecked in the Humber.
Talbot	United Kingdom	The steamship was driven ashore and wrecked at Ostend. All on board were rescued.
Two Friends	United Kingdom	The fishing boat was driven ashore at Filey. Her crew were rescued
Union	United Kingdom	The fishing boat was driven ashore at Filey. Her crew were rescued
Union	United Kingdom	The ship was driven ashore and wrecked at Atwick with the loss of three of her crew.
Vine	United Kingdom	The ship was driven ashore near Wells-next-the-Sea.
Vrouw Alida	Netherlands	The koff was driven ashore and wrecked at Ostend. Her crew were rescued. She was on a voyage from Amsterdam to Porto, Portugal.
Warrior	United Kingdom	The brig was abandoned in the North Sea off Blankenberge, West Flanders with the loss of one of her eleven crew. Survivors were rescued by La Nathalie (Belgian Navy). Warrior was on a voyage from Rotterdam, South Holland, Netherlands to Jersey.
William	United Kingdom	The ship was driven ashore and wrecked at Calais with the loss of ten of her crew.

== 2 September ==
List of shipwrecks: 2 September 1833
Ship	State	Description
Acorn	United Kingdom	The ship was driven ashore 3 nautical miles (5.6 km) west of Ostend, West Flanders, Belgium. Her crew were rescued. She was on a voyage from London to Havre de Grâce, Seine-Inférieure, France. Acorn was subsequently repaired.
Alexander	France	The ship was driven ashore and wrecked at Ostend with the loss of fourteen lives.
Chance	United Kingdom	The ship was driven ashore at Bathurst, New Brunswick, British North America. She was refloated on 11 September.
Cupid	United Kingdom	The ship was abandoned in the Grand Banks of Newfoundland. She was on a voyage from Colchester, Essex to Quebec City, Lower Canada, British North America.
Cyrus	United Kingdom	The ship foundered 2 leagues (6 nautical miles (11 km) south of Guernsey, Channel Islands. Her crew were rescued by Alfred. Cyrus was on a voyage from Livorno, Kingdom of Sardinia to London.
Frederika Caroline	Sweden	The ship was driven ashore near Blankenberge, West Flanders. She was on a voyage from Gothenburg to Saint-Malo, Ille-et-Vilaine, France.
Hannah	United Kingdom	The ship foundered in the North Sea with the loss of all eight crew.
Hope	United Kingdom	The schooner was abandoned in the North Sea. Her seven crew were rescued by Louisa (United Kingdom).
Laurel	Belgium	The ship was driven ashore at Nieuwpoort, West Flanders. Her crew were rescued. She was on a voyage from Antwerp to the Cape Verde Islands, Portugal. Laurel was later sold and taken in to Ostend for repairs.
Louisa Barbara	Netherlands	The ship struck a rock off the Channel Islands and was abandoned by her crew. She was subsequently taken in to Jersey by HMRC Sylvia ( Board of Customs). Louisa Barbara was on a voyage from Philadelphia, Pennsylvania, United States to Amsterdam, North Holland.
Prins Frederick	Netherlands	The brig was driven ashore 2 leagues (6 nautical miles (11 km)) east of Calais, France. Her eighteen crew survived. She was on a voyage from Rotterdam, South Holland to Batavia, Netherlands East Indies.
Ridder Darre	Norway	The brig was driven ashore 3 nautical miles (5.6 km) east of Blankenberge. Her crew were rescued. She was on a voyage from Sarpsborg to Dieppe, Seine-Inférieure.
Sophia	Netherlands	The ship sprang a leak and was beached at "Holln", She was on a voyage from the Netherlands to Larvik, Norway.
Swea	Sweden	The ship foundered in the North Sea. Her crew were rescued by John Barry (United Kingdom. Swea was on a voyage from Gävle to London.
Viewly Hill	United Kingdom	The ship was driven ashore on Horse Island, Essex. She was on a voyage from Goole, Yorkshire to London.
Vordsche	Norway	The ship was driven ashore and wrecked 6 nautical miles (11 km) east of Ostend. Her crew were rescued. She was on a voyage from Rotterdam, South Holland to St. Ubes, Spain.
Vrow Geerdina	Prussia	The ship was driven ashore near Nieuwpoort. Her crew were rescued. She was on a voyage from Memel to Honfleur, Calvados, France.
Yachinthe	France	The ship was in collision with Polly (United Kingdom) in the Atlantic Ocean (43°28′N 50°00′W) and foundered. Her crew were rescued by Polly.

== 3 September ==
List of shipwrecks: 3 September 1833
Ship	State	Description
Beurs van Amsterdam	Netherlands	The steamship was driven ashore and wrecked east of the Sluysche Gat. All on board were rescued. She was on a voyage from Rotterdam, South Holland to Dunkirk, Nord, France.
Dalmarnock	United States	The ship was abandoned in the North Sea. She was later taken in to Dunkirk. Dalmarnock was on a voyage from New Bedford, Massachusetts to Bremen.
Juliana	Prussia	The ship foundered in the North Sea.
Margaret	United Kingdom	The sloop ran adround on the Drum Sand, in the Firth of Forth off Cramond, lothian and sank. Her crew survived.
Victory	United Kingdom	The ship was driven ashore at Harwich, Essex.

== 4 September ==
List of shipwrecks: 4 September 1833
Ship	State	Description
Amity	United Kingdom	The ship was driven ashore and wrecked at North Somercotes, Lincolnshire.
Archimedes	United Kingdom	The ship was driven ashore on the Isle of Sheppey, Kent. She was on a voyage from London to Newcastle upon Tyne, Northumberland.
Helen	United Kingdom	The schooner was wrecked at Calais, France. Her crew were rescued. She was on a voyage from Newcastle upon Tyne to Exeter, Devon.
Hoffnung	Stettin	The ship was driven ashore at Thisted, Denmark. Her crew were rescued. She was on a voyage from Stettin to Arbroath, Forfarshire, United Kingdom.
Malvina	United Kingdom	The brig was wrecked on the Mouse Sand, in the North Sea off the coast of Essex. Her crew were rescued. She was on a voyage from Arkhangelsk, Russia to London.
Regulus	United Kingdom	The ship was driven ashore at Whitstable, Kent. Regulus was refloated on 13 September.

== 5 September ==
List of shipwrecks: 5 September 1833
Ship	State	Description
Diamond	United Kingdom	The ship was driven ashore on Borkum, Kingdom of Hanover. Her crew were rescued. She was on a voyage from Wick, Caithness to Hamburg.
Herman Gran	Norway	The ship was abandoned in the North Sea. Her crew were rescued by a Danish vessel. She was on a voyage from St. Ubes, Spain to Bergen.
William	United Kingdom	The full-rigged ship was wrecked at Calais with the loss of ten of the 22 people on board. She was on a voyage from Quebec City, Lower Canada, British North America to London.

== 6 September ==
List of shipwrecks: 6 September 1833
Ship	State	Description
Active	United Kingdom	The ship was lost on the Mouse Sand, in the North Sea off the coast of Essex with some loss of life. She was on a voyage from Arkhangelsk, Russia to London.
Active	United Kingdom	The ship was driven ashore on Vlieland, Friesland, Netherlands. Her crew were rescued. She was on a voyage from Hamburg to King's Lynn, Norfolk.
Amalia	Hamburg	The ship was driven ashore and wrecked on Texel, North Holland, Netherlands. Her crew were rescued. She was on a voyage from Altona to Dunkirk, Nord, France.
Ann and Mary	United Kingdom	The ship was driven ashore and wrecked on Schouwen, Zeeland, Netherlands. Her crew were rescued
Beurs van Rotterdam	Netherlands	The steamship foundered in the North Sea off the coast of Nord. All on board were rescued.
Orion	United Kingdom	The ship was driven ashore at the "Meirslygte", Bremen.
Vrow Henriette	Hamburg	The ship was wrecked on Vlieland, Friesland, Netherlands with the loss of two of her crew. She was on a voyage from Hamburg to saint-Malo, Ille-et-Vilaine, France.

== 7 September ==
List of shipwrecks: 7 September 1833
Ship	State	Description
Anne	United Kingdom	The ship was driven ashore in the River Thames at Northfleet, Kent.
Claudius	Hamburg	The ship was wrecked on Anegada, Virgin Islands. She was on a voyage from Hamburg to Veracruz, Mexico.
Eadon	United Kingdom	The ship was lost on the Heaps Sand, in the North Sea off the coast of Essex. Her crew were rescued. She was on a voyage from Heligoland to London.
James M. Krippler	United States	The ship foundered whilst on a voyage from Trinidad de Cuba to Philadelphia, Pennsylvania. All on board were rescued.

== 8 September ==
List of shipwrecks: 8 September 1833
Ship	State	Description
Minerva	United Kingdom	The ship sprang a leakn and foundered in the North Sea off Blakeney, Norfolk. Her crew were rescued. She was on a voyage from Newcastle upon Tyne, Northumberland to Southampton, Hampshire.

== 10 September ==
List of shipwrecks: 10 September 1833
Ship	State	Description
Agenoria	United Kingdom	The ship was wrecked on Prince Edward Island, British North America. She was on a voyage from "Ross" to Miramichi, New Brunswick, British North America.
Fanny and Matilda	United Kingdom	The ship was wrecked on South Ronaldsay, Orkney Islands. Her crew were rescued. She was on a voyage from Saint Petersburg, Russia to Liverpool, Lancashire.
Rival	United Kingdom	The ship was spoken to by Stirlingshire (United Kingdom) whilst on a voyage from Havana, Cuba to London. No further trace, presumed foundered with the loss of all hands.

== 11 September ==
List of shipwrecks: 11 September 1833
Ship	State	Description
Anglicana	United Kingdom	The ship was driven ashore at "Faludd", Götaland, Sweden. She was on a voyage from Saint Petersburg, Russia to London.

== 12 September ==
List of shipwrecks: 12 September 1833
Ship	State	Description
Squirrel	United Kingdom	The ship was driven ashore at Callantsoog, North Holland, Netherlands. She was on a voyage from Vlissingen, Zeeland, Netherlands to Sunderland, County Durham.
Rowena	United Kingdom	The ship sprang a leak and foundered in the English Channel off Dover, Kent. Her crew were rescued by Cybele (United Kingdom). Rowena was on a voyage from Guernsey, Channel Islands to Chatham, Kent.
Vriendschap	Netherlands	The ship was driven ashore near Huisduinen, North Holland. She was on a voyage from London, United Kingdom to Rotterdam, South Holland.

== 14 September ==
List of shipwrecks: 14 September 1833
Ship	State	Description
Anna	United Kingdom	The ship was wrecked at Aberavon, Glamorgan. She was on a voyage from Great Yarmouth, Norfolk to Bristol, Gloucestershire.
Lusitania	United Kingdom	The ship was driven ashore at Aberystwyth, Cardiganshire.

== 15 September ==
List of shipwrecks: 15 September 1833
Ship	State	Description
United Kingdom	United Kingdom	The ship was run down and sunk in the River Thames at Northfleet, Kent by the steamship Queen of Scotland. She was refloated on 27 September.
William Ewing	United Kingdom	The ship was driven ashore at the "Potteries". She was on a voyage from Saint John, New Brunswick, British North America to Liverpool, Lancashire.

== 16 September ==
List of shipwrecks: 16 September 1833
Ship	State	Description
United Kingdom	United Kingdom	The ship was run down and sunk in the River Thames at Northfleet, Kent by the steamship Queen of Scotland. United Kingdom was on a voyage from Jamaica to London.

== 19 September ==
List of shipwrecks: 19 September 1833
Ship	State	Description
Alexandra Louisa	Prussia	The barque foundered in the Irish Sea. She was on a voyage from Lancaster, Lancashire, United Kingdom to Liverpool, Lancashire.

== 21 September ==
List of shipwrecks: 21 September 1833
Ship	State	Description
Catherina	Hamburg	The ship was wrecked on Vlieland, Friesland, Netherlands with the loss of all hands. She was on a voyage from Hamburg to Wells-next-the-Sea, Norfolk, United Kingdom.

== 22 September ==
List of shipwrecks: 22 September 1833
Ship	State	Description
City of Waterford	United Kingdom	The steamship ran aground 6 to 8 nautical miles (11 to 15 km) off San Martiño, Cíes Islands, Spain and broke up. All on board survived.

== 23 September ==
List of shipwrecks: 23 September 1833
Ship	State	Description
Hibernia	United Kingdom	The ship foundered in the Bristol Channel off Penarth, Glamorgan. Her crew were rescued.

== 24 September ==
List of shipwrecks: 24 September 1833
Ship	State	Description
James	United Kingdom	The ship was driven ashore at Mevagissey, Cornwall. Her crew were rescued. She was on a voyage from Memel, Prussia to Waterford. James was refloated on 28 September but was declared a total loss.
Lord Gambier	United Kingdom	The ship was wrecked at Aberayron, Cardiganshire. She was refloated on 8 October and taken in to Milford Haven, Pembrokeshire.
Lustre	United Kingdom	The ship was driven ashore and wrecked at Littlehampton, Sussex.

== 25 September ==
List of shipwrecks: 25 September 1833
Ship	State	Description
Wilson	United Kingdom	The barque was abandoned in the Atlantic Ocean. She was on a voyage from Gloucester to Saint Andrews, New Brunswick, British North America. One boat with eight crew on board reached Bere Island, County Cork; the other, with six crew on board, arrived at Bantry, County Cork.

== 27 September ==
List of shipwrecks: 27 September 1833
Ship	State	Description
Portland	United Kingdom	The ship was wrecked on a reef off Barren Joey Island, 17 nautical miles (31 km) east of George Town Heads with the loss of two lives. She was on a voyage from Sydney to Launceston, Van Diemen's Land.

== 28 September ==
List of shipwrecks: 28 September 1833
Ship	State	Description
Blagdon	United Kingdom	The ship was abandoned in the Atlantic Ocean. Her crew were rescued by Emma (United Kingdom): Blagdon was on a voyage from Virginia, United States to Leith, Lothian.

== 29 September ==
List of shipwrecks: 29 September 1833
Ship	State	Description
Rose	United Kingdom	The ship departed from a port in Brazil for Newfoundland. No further trace, presumed foundered with the loss of all hands.

== 30 September ==
List of shipwrecks: 30 September 1833
Ship	State	Description
Solway	United Kingdom	The ship was driven ashore at Connel Ferry, Argyllshire. She was on a voyage from Glasgow, Renfrewshire to Liverpool, Lancashire.

== Unknown date ==
List of shipwrecks: Unknown date 1833
Ship	State	Description
Adamant	United Kingdom	The ship was lost in early September.
Ann	United Kingdom	The ship was driven ashore at Northfleet, Kent.
Ann and Mary	United Kingdom	The ship was wrecked near Rotterdam, South Holland, Netherlands. She was on a voyage from London to Newcastle upon Tyne, Northumberland.
Benlomond	United Kingdom	The brig foundered in the North Sea in early September with the loss of all hands. She was on a voyage from Hamburg to Douglas, Isle of Man.
Britannia	United Kingdom	The ship was lost on the Hinder Sandbank, in the North Sea. She was on a voyage from Rotterdam to Stockton-on-Tees, County Durham.
Catherine	United Kingdom	The ship was wrecked on Vlieland, Friesland, Netherlands with the loss of all hands. She was on a voyage from Hamburg to Wells-next-the-Sea, Norfolk.
Cumberland	United Kingdom	The ship foundered in the North Sea in early September.
Eden	United Kingdom	The ship was wrecked on the Heeps Sandbank, in the North Sea.
Emily	United Kingdom	The ship was driven ashore in early September. She was refloated on 16 September and taken in to Hull, Yorkshire.
Flora	United Kingdom	The schooner foundered in the North Sea off Whitstable, Kent in early September.
Friends	United Kingdom	The ship foundered in the North Sea in early September.
Glasgow	United Kingdom	The ship foundered in the North Sea in early September.
Henrietta	United Kingdom	The ship foundered in the North Sea in early September.
Hewsingers	United Kingdom	The ship was lost in early September.
Hope	United Kingdom	The ship was abandoned at sea.
Jane and Martha	United Kingdom	The ship departed from Whitehaven, Cumberland for Wigtown. No further trace, presumed foundered in the Irish Sea with the loss of all hands.
Loyal Standard	United Kingdom	The ship foundered in the North Sea off the coast of Suffolk in early September.
Lucy and Mary	United Kingdom	The ship was driven ashore at Castle Rising, Norfolk.
Mary and Ann	Belgium	The ship foundered in the North Sea off Ameland, Friesland, Netherlands. She was on a voyage from Emden, Kingdom of Hanover to Antwerp.
Nestor	United Kingdom	The ship ran aground and capsized in the River Usk. She was on a voyage from Saint John, New Brunswick, British North America to Newport, Monmouthshire.
Petersburgh	United Kingdom	The ship was lost in early September.
Paul Pry	United Kingdom	The ship foundered in the North Sea off the coast of Yorkshire in early September.
Prince Leopold	(United Kingdom of Great Britain and Ireland) Isle of Man	The ship was driven ashore and wrecked near the mouth of the River Wyre before 26 September.
Spero	United States	The ship was driven ashore at Cley-next-the-Sea, Norfolk.
Thorne	United Kingdom	The ship was driven ashore at Domburg, Zeeland, Netherlands in early September.
Triune	United Kingdom	The ship was driven ashore at Holbeach, Lincolnshire. She was on a voyage from London to Leeds, Yorkshire.
Two Cousins	United Kingdom	The ship foundered in the North Sea in early September.
Volante	United Kingdom	The ship foundered in the North Sea in early September.
Yarmouth	United Kingdom	The ship foundered in the North Sea in early September.
