= Horstendaal =

Dutch ship (1739–1742)

History

Dutch Republic
- Name: Horstendaal
- Owner: Dutch East India Company; Chamber of Amsterdam
- Completed: 1739
- Fate: Wrecked on 15 October 1742

General characteristics
- Type: East Indiaman
- Length: 145 feet
- Sail plan: 3 masts
- Capacity: loading capacity: 850 tons
- Crew: 260

Horstendaal, also written as Horftendaal and Horstendael, was an 18th-century East Indiaman of the Dutch East India Company.

During her first return voyage from Batavia, she stranded in September 1742. The crew and most of the cargo was rescued. After the ship was refloated in October, she wrecked a few days later at the Scheldt estuary, Dutch Republic, on 15 October 1742 at Buizengat, between Callantsoog and Huisduinen.

== Ship details ==
Horstendaal was built in 1739 in Amsterdam for the Chamber of Amsterdam. She was 145 feet long, had a loading capacity of 850 tons. She was a wooden full-rigged ship with 3 masts. The ship had 260 crew members.

== History and fate ==
On 2 October 1739, soon after the ship was launched she went to Batavia under command of Leendert Jongebroer. She had an intermediate stop at Cape of Good Hope between 7 and 25 March 1740.

Two years later she started her return voyage to Amsterdam on 19 January 1742 under command of captain Jan Kelder with a cargo of among other pepper, coffee, tea, and silk. She had an intermediate stop at Cape of Good Hope between 22 April 1742 to 11 May 1742. During the last part of the voyage the ship ran aground at Buizengat, between Callantsoog and Huisduinen on 19 September 1742. Two masts were cut down and thrown overboard. Besides of that, the ship was not seriously damaged. Due to the bad weather it was not immediately possible to rescue the crew. Beach surveillance was immediately requested by Jacob Coren in case valuable cargo washed ashore. During the evening of 20 September, two VOC officials sent two ships from Den Helder to the ship to rescue the crew and save as much as possible of the cargo. In the newspaper it was stated that the crew was during the evening “still on the ship”. The next day the Heren XVII, the central government of the Dutch East India Company, came together to discuss the issue. It was decided to leave the recovery of the cargo to the Noorderkwartier.

The strong wind made it difficult or even impossible to unload the cargo. All the crew were rescued. The ship was unloaded as much as possible, including all letters. The ship was still in good condition on September 25, but four days later the ship had a leak. They had to pump hard to get the water out of the ship.

In early October the Heren XVII discussed if the crew of the ship should still receive their owed wages and monthly allowances. It was decided to pay the monthly fee until the day of the accident, so 19 September. The Court of Audit conducted an investigation into this, but the outcome is unclear.

In October the VOC was able to refloat the ship. However, a few days later on 15 October 1742 she ran aground again. The contractors were unable to refloat the ship from the beach, due to an upcoming storm. The ship broke into pieces. On 16 October 1742 the wreckage was publicity sold.

== Salvage interests ==
The salvage of goods from stranded or wrecked ships was in that era in the Dutch Republic a lucrative business. The jurisdiction received a third of the proceeds from goods sold. The Horstendaal had valuable cargo onboard. That is also the reason Jacob Coren hurried after the stranding with beach surveillance in case valuable cargo washed ashore. The position of the Horstendaal at the Buisegat was exactly between the jurisdiction of the regents of Callantsoog and that of the regents of Huisduinen and Den Helder. Intense discussion started soon about beach rights between Callantsoog and Huisduinen. However, a final decision about the rights took years.
