= Oude Zijpe =

Dutch ship (1740–1742)

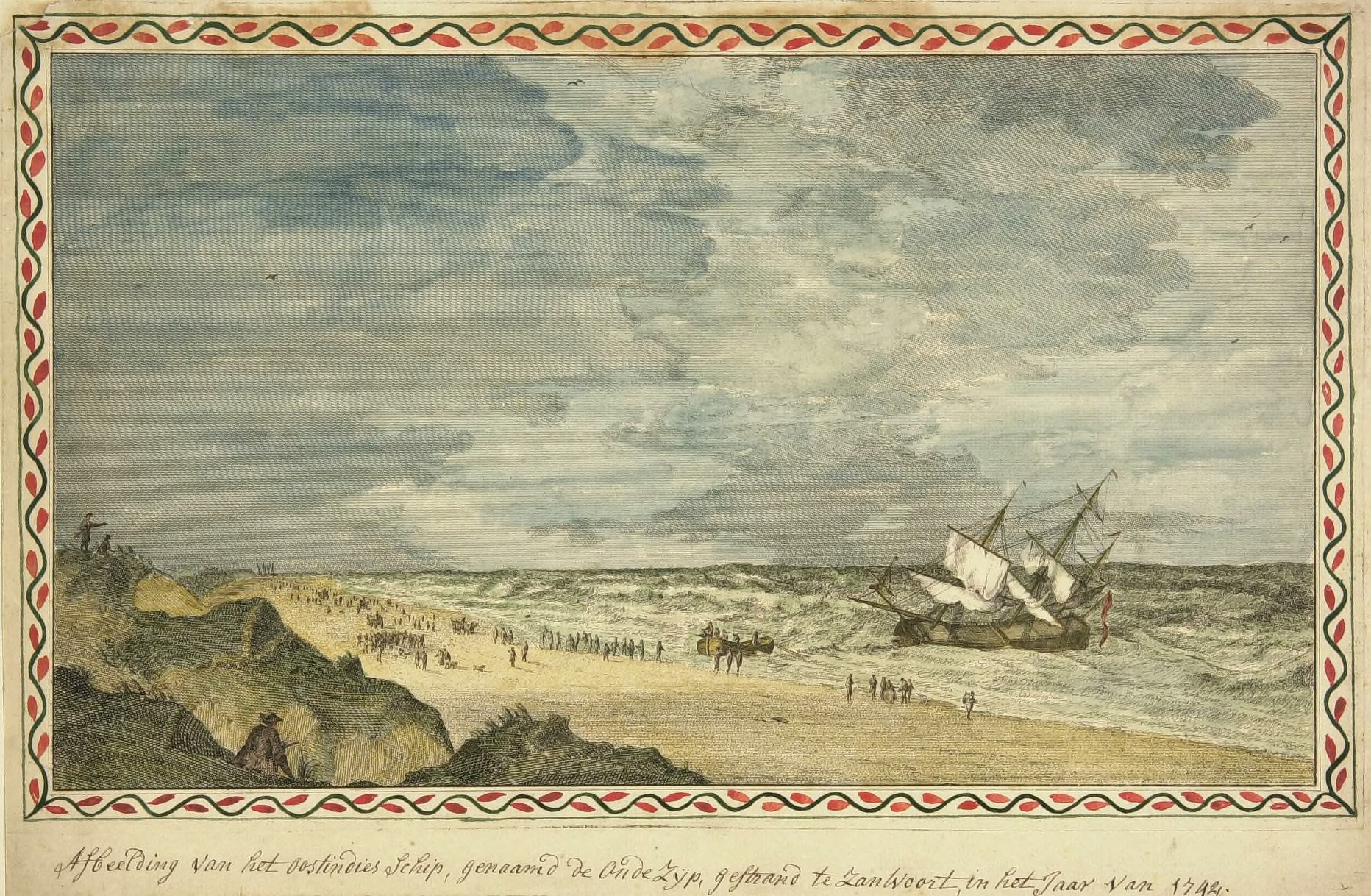
- 18th-century illustration

History

Dutch Republic
- Name: Oude Zijpe
- Owner: Dutch East India Company; Chamber of Hoorn
- Completed: 1740
- Fate: Ran aground on 22 September 1742 near Zandvoort

General characteristics
- Type: Fluyt
- Tons burthen: 325 bm
- Length: 130 feet
- Capacity: loading capacity: 650 tons
- Crew: 150

Oude Zijpe, also written as Oude Zype, Oude Zijp and Oude Sype was an 18th-century fluyt of the Dutch East India Company.

During the last part of her first return voyage from Batavia, she ran aground during a heavy storm on 22 September 1742 off Bloemendaal, 0.5 mile north of Zandvoort. The crew and most of the cargo was rescued.

== Ship details ==
Oude Zijpe was built in 1740 in Hoorn for the Chamber of Hoorn. She was 130 feet long, had a loading capacity of 650 tons. The ship had capacity for 150 crew members.

== Sole voyage and fate ==
On 29 June 1740, soon after the ship was launched, she went to Batavia under command of Joost Anker. She had an intermediate stop at Cape of Good Hope between 16 December 1740 and 19 January 1741. She arrived at Batavia on 28 May 1741.

A year later she started her return voyage to Amsterdam on 19 January 1742 under command of captain Joost Anker with a cargo of among others pepper and muskat. She had an intermediate stop at Cape of Good Hope between 22 April 1742 to 11 May 1742.

After having lost all her anchors, she ran aground during a heavy storm on 22 September 1742 off Bloemendaal, 0.5 mile north of Zandvoort. The around 80 crew members were rescued. The Heeren XVII, the central government of the Dutch East India Company, decided to salvage only the valuable private chests. Ten days later they ordered also to salvage the silk.

== Legacy ==
=== Depictions ===
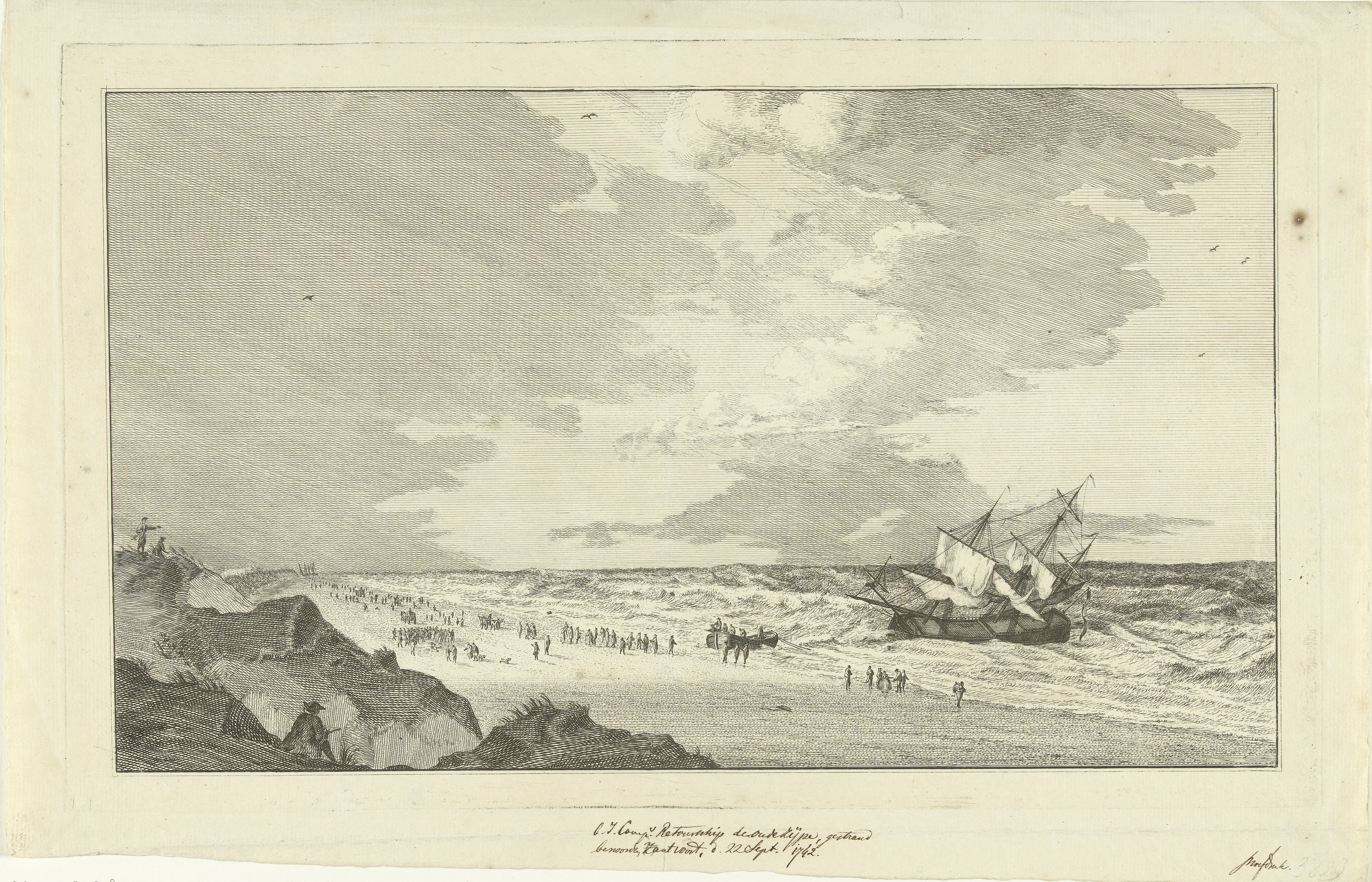
Etching of the Rijksmuseum collection

Het Scheepvaartmuseum, the Dutch Maritime Museum in Amsterdam, contains an anonymous drawing of the stranding of this ship. The library of the museum contains a printed report of the stranding, including an engraving.

Rijksmuseum in Amsterdam also has in their collection an etching of the ship.

=== Anchor ===
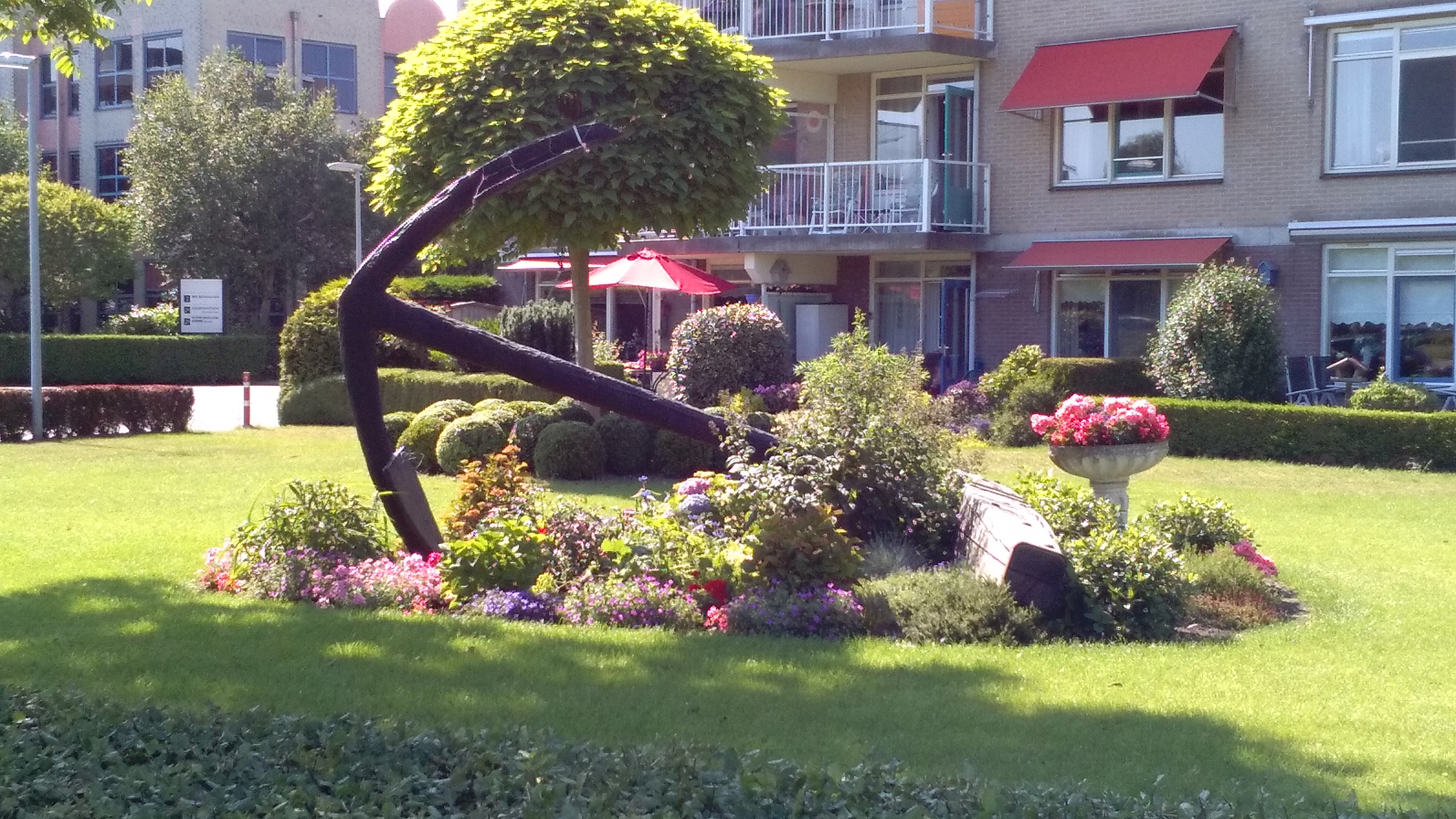
The anchor of Oude Zijpe that was found in 1938.

One of the lost anchors was found by fishermen off the coast of Zandvoort in 1938. A year later it was brought to Amsterdam on an inland vessel. It was transferred to Hoorn by a ship of the Hoornsche Stoomboot Maatschappij where it arrived in 1939. Between 1941 and 1969 the anchor was on “Noorderplantsoen”, a filled-in part of Draafsingel, in front of Hoorn railway station. Due to vandalism, it was moved to the garden of the Westfries Museum in 1969. Aftet the museum's garden was changed in 1984 to a reconstruction of an 18th-century garden, the anchor was moved to Oostereiland. Since 1990, the anchor has been in the neighbourhood Risdam-Zuid, in front of apartment block “Koopvaarder”.

== Controversy ==
In 1986, a wreck was discovered near Bloemendaal aan Zee, which was stated to be Oude Zijpe. However, the shape is not the same as the known size of the ship. In addition, copper spots and bronze pins were found that were only used this way a century after the construction of Oude Zijpe.
