= Westerbeek =

Dutch East India Company sailing ship

History
- Owner: Dutch East India Company
- Launched: 1722
- Fate: Wrecked 1742

General characteristics
- Tonnage: 650 tons
- Length: 145 ft (44 m)

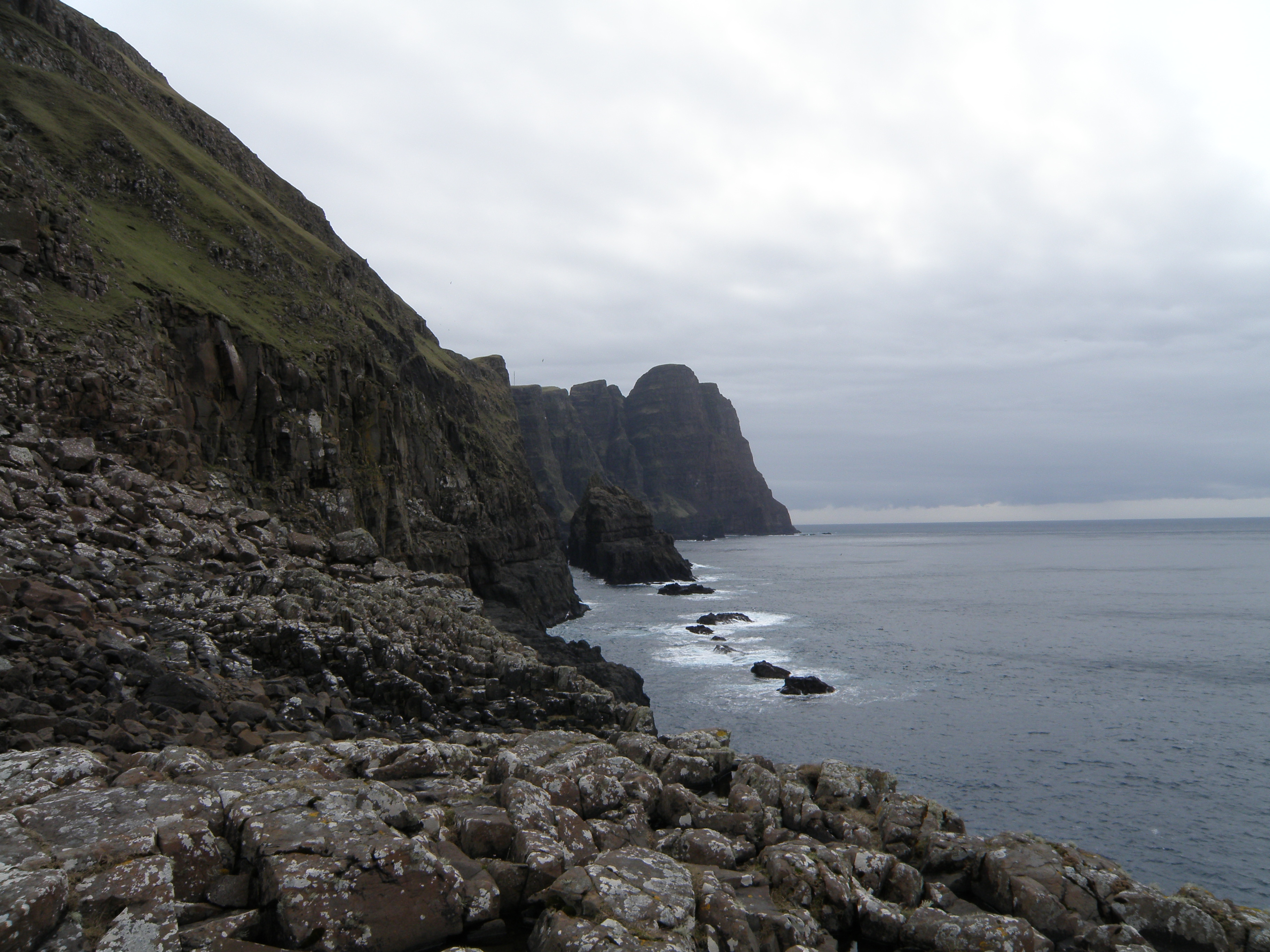
The accident with Westerbeek happened here south of Lopranseiði, the ship went between the four skerries and the steep sea cliff of Lopranseiði, just below the mountain Kirvi.

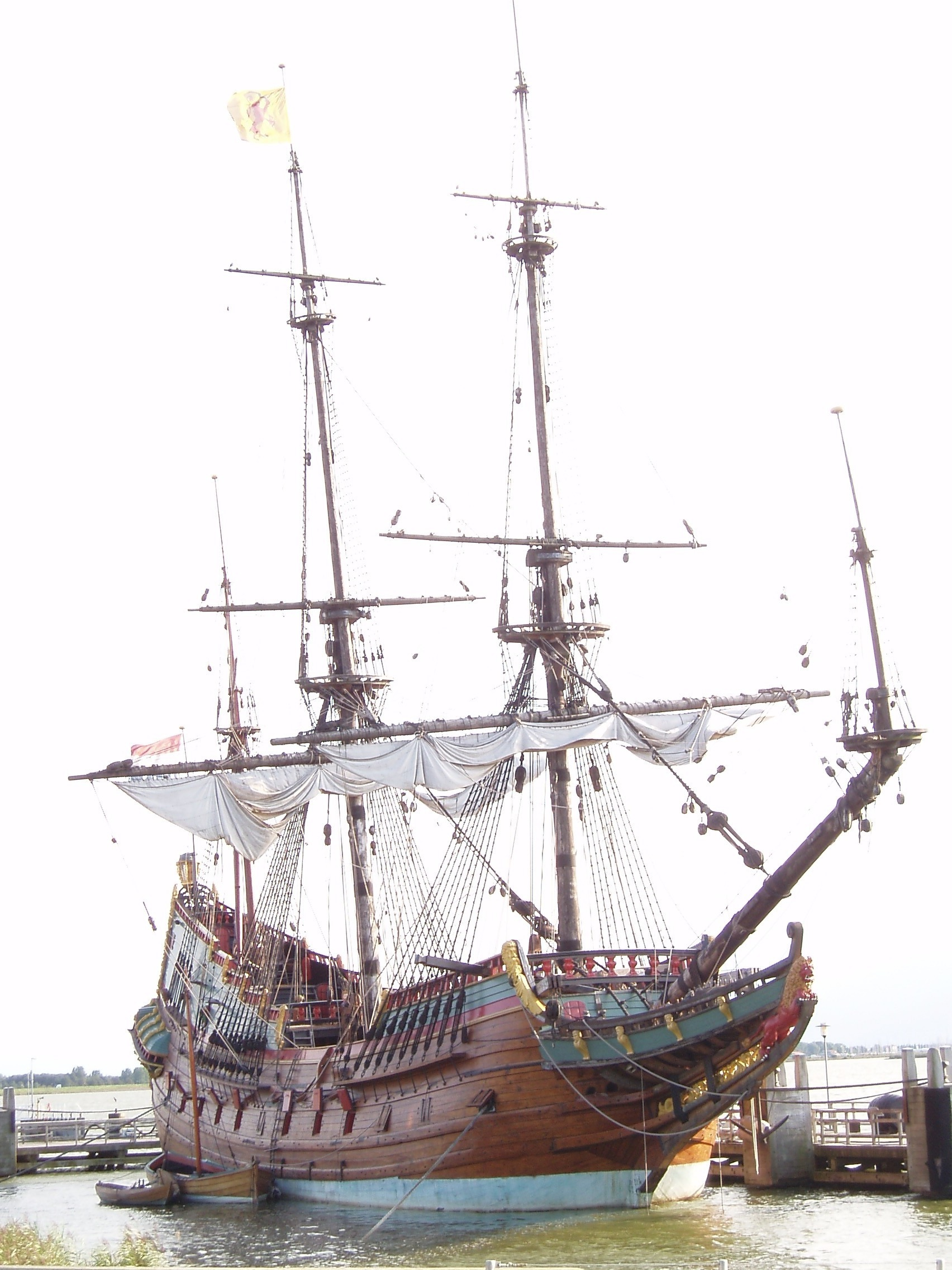
Batavia, which is a copy of VOC Batavia, which was a sister-ship of Westerbeek. This ship was built from 1985 to 1995.

Westerbeek was a Dutch East India Company sailing ship, built in 1722 in Amsterdam. It was 145 feet (44 m) long and 650 tons.

== The accident ==
The ship was wrecked at Lopranseiði on the west coast of Suðuroy, Faroe Islands on 2 September 1742. In those days it was necessary either to see the stars or the sun in order to navigate a ship, that is to know how far north or how far south the ship was. The crew of Westerbeek had not seen the sun because of fog for 11 days on the day of the accident, and because of that they went too far north. Too late they realized, that they were about to sail directly on land, and the ship went on land between four skerries and a sea cliff of Suðuroy on Lopranseiði. The accident happened on Westerbeek's 6th voyage from the Dutch East Indies. The captain of this voyage was Hermanus Schutten. The cargo was usually tea, coffee, pepper and other spices. The voyage to the East Indies could take up to one year, and often the ships were away from home several years, before returning home.

On 2 September 1742 around 10:30 at night Westerbeek ran on land south of Lopranseiði and sank between the four skerries and the island of Suðuroy. Ten of the men never had the time to leave their beds, as they were lying there because of illness. Three men died before the accident and were buried at sea. 81 of the men reached land after the accident, but one of them fell and died while attempting to climb the steep hill where the ship wrecked. They climbed on land through the broken mast of the ship. Then they tied together some oars and then some of the strongest of the men climbed up the hill to get help. Lopra was not a village at that time. The nearest populated places were Vágur and Sumba. A few men went towards north and arrived to Vágur, where they got help. The legend says, that some people from Vágur were in the church and that the men from Westerbeek got help from them there.

== The survivors and their further voyage ==
Research shows that all these 80 men were rescued. They then started the voyage from Suðuroy to Tórshavn, the capital of the Faroe Islands. Today a journey from Suðuroy to Tórshavn takes two hours by ferry, but in 1742 they used Faroese rowing boats for transport, and it took several days with breaks in some of the islands, which they passed on their way to Tórshavn. A book has been published about the accident of Westerbeek and about the story of the men who survived. The book is written by Mathias Lassen. In the book he describes, that the 80 men traveled to Tórshavn in small rowing boats. They stopped in Skúvoy but were not so welcome there, so they continued to the island of Sandoy, where they were warmly welcomed in the village Skálavík. From Skálavík they continued to the village Kirkjubøur in the south-western side of Streymoy. They were not welcome there and got neither food nor dry clothes, so they continued to Tórshavn. In Tórshavn two ships were ready to leave for Denmark, and the plan was to get all these 80 men on board these two ships. But the captains of the two ships were afraid to take so many men with them and refused. Only 10 men were allowed to travel with them to Denmark. These were the last ships that year, so these 70 men had to stay all winter in the Faroe Islands, they stayed there for 9 months.

== Faroese people descendant from the crew of Westerbeek ==
There are many stories about men from Westerbeek who stayed in the Faroes or sired children in the Faroes, but only a few of these stories can be verified. Joseph Gervording stayed in the Faroe Islands and married Marianna, the bailiff's daughter; they had three children, but no grandchildren. Then there was a woman from the village of Lamba, the mother of twins fathered by one of the Westerbeek's crew, but both mother and children died in an avalanche in Gerðum in Klaksvík in 1745. Finally there was a girl from the island of Vágar, who had a daughter with Berent Schouten, the Westerbeek's carpenter. The daughter, Sunneva Berentsdatter, is an ancestor of many Faroese.

== Gallery ==
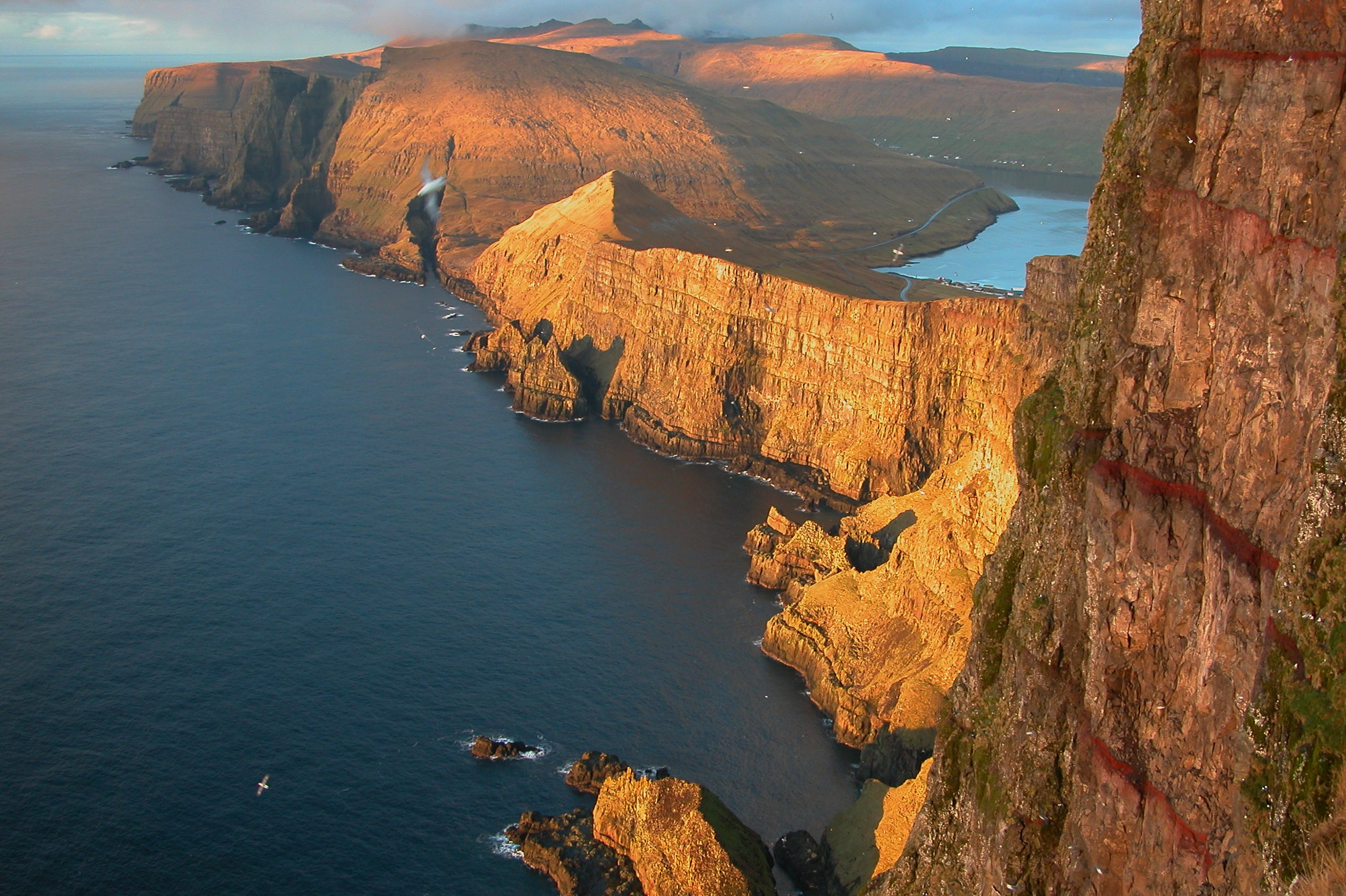
The ship went between the four skerries and the steep sea cliff of Lopranseiði, just below the mountain (under the bird).

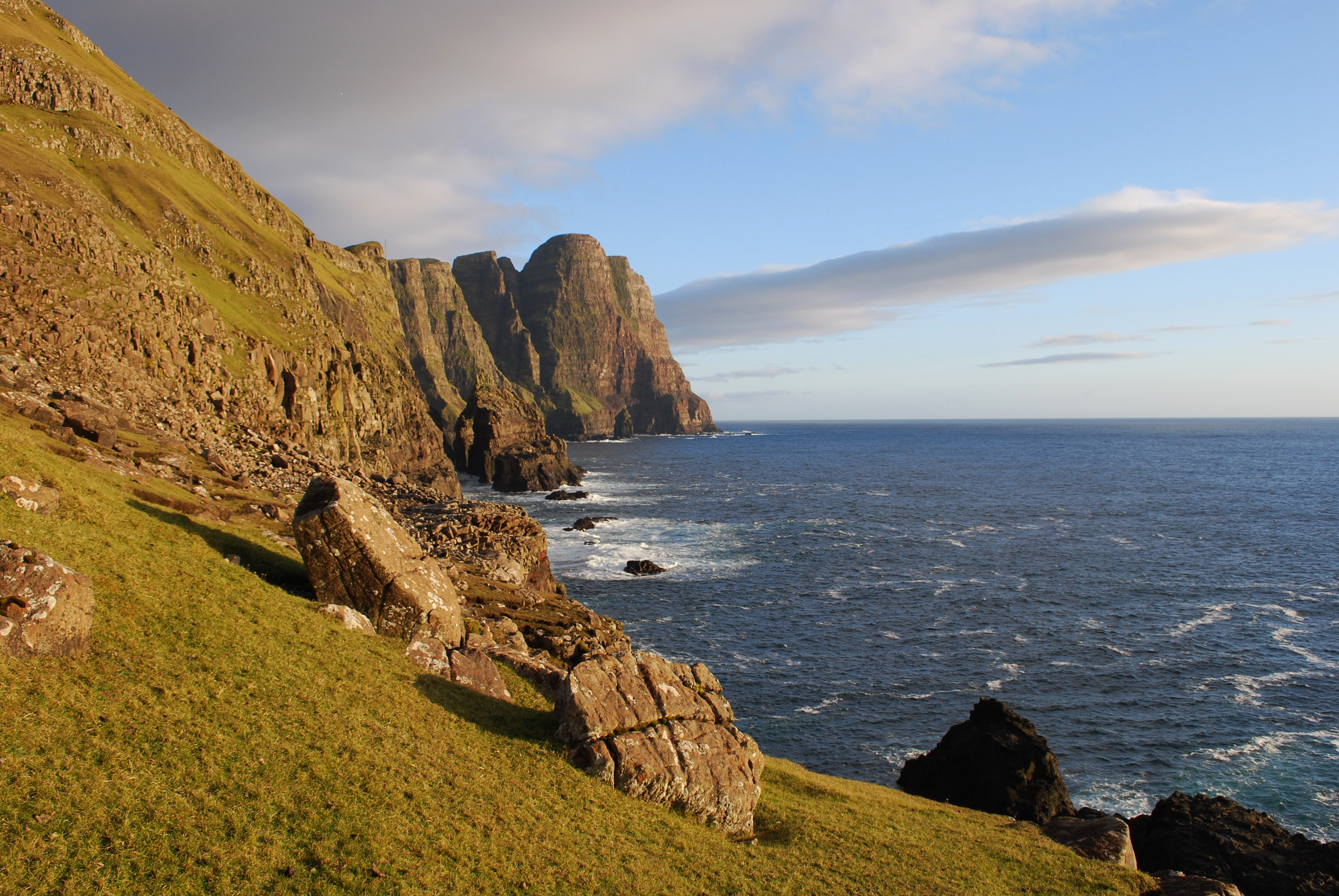
"Some of the strongest of the men climbed up the hill to get help".

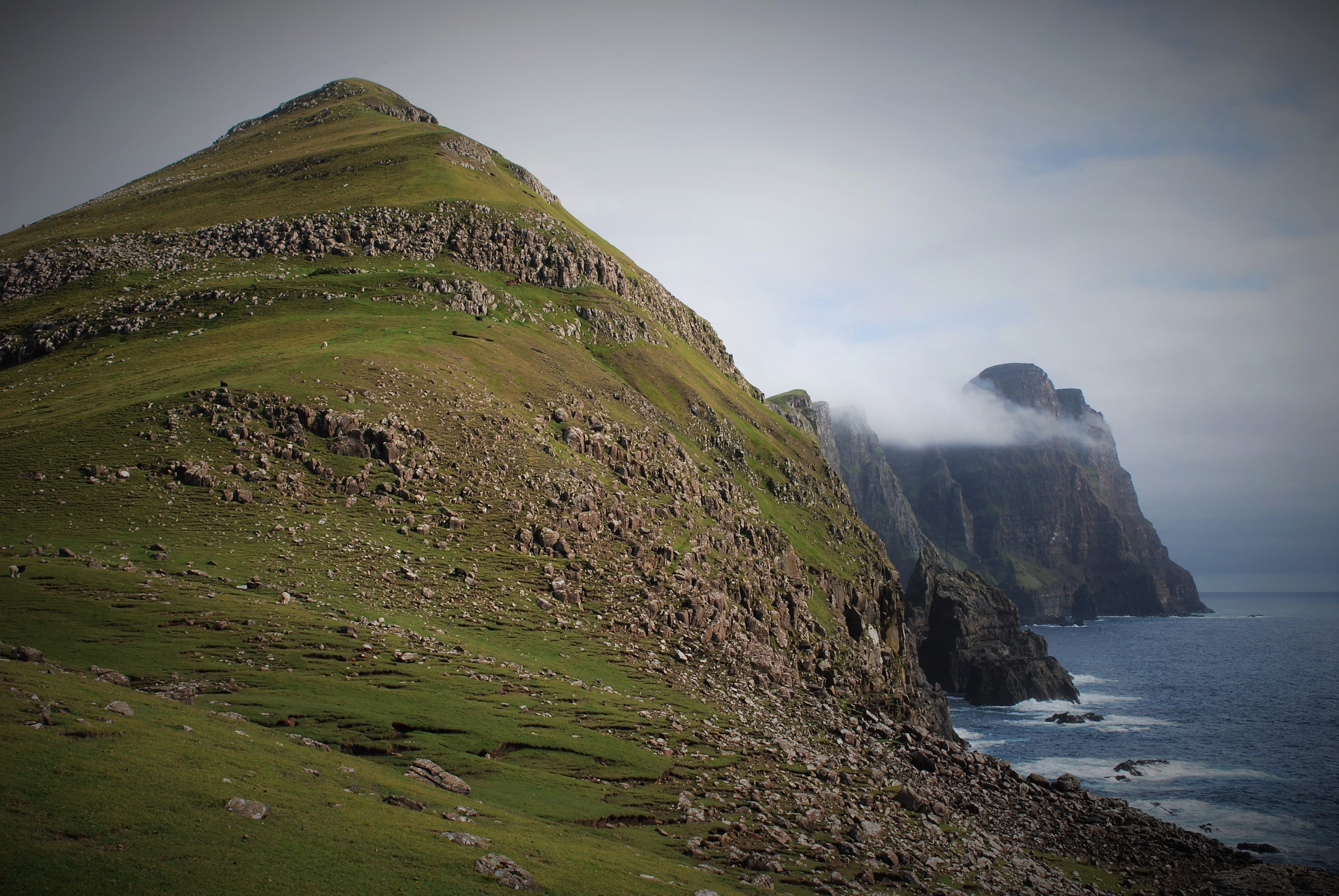
The accident with Westerbeek happened here south of Lopranseiði
