= Fluyt =

Dutch type of sailing vessel

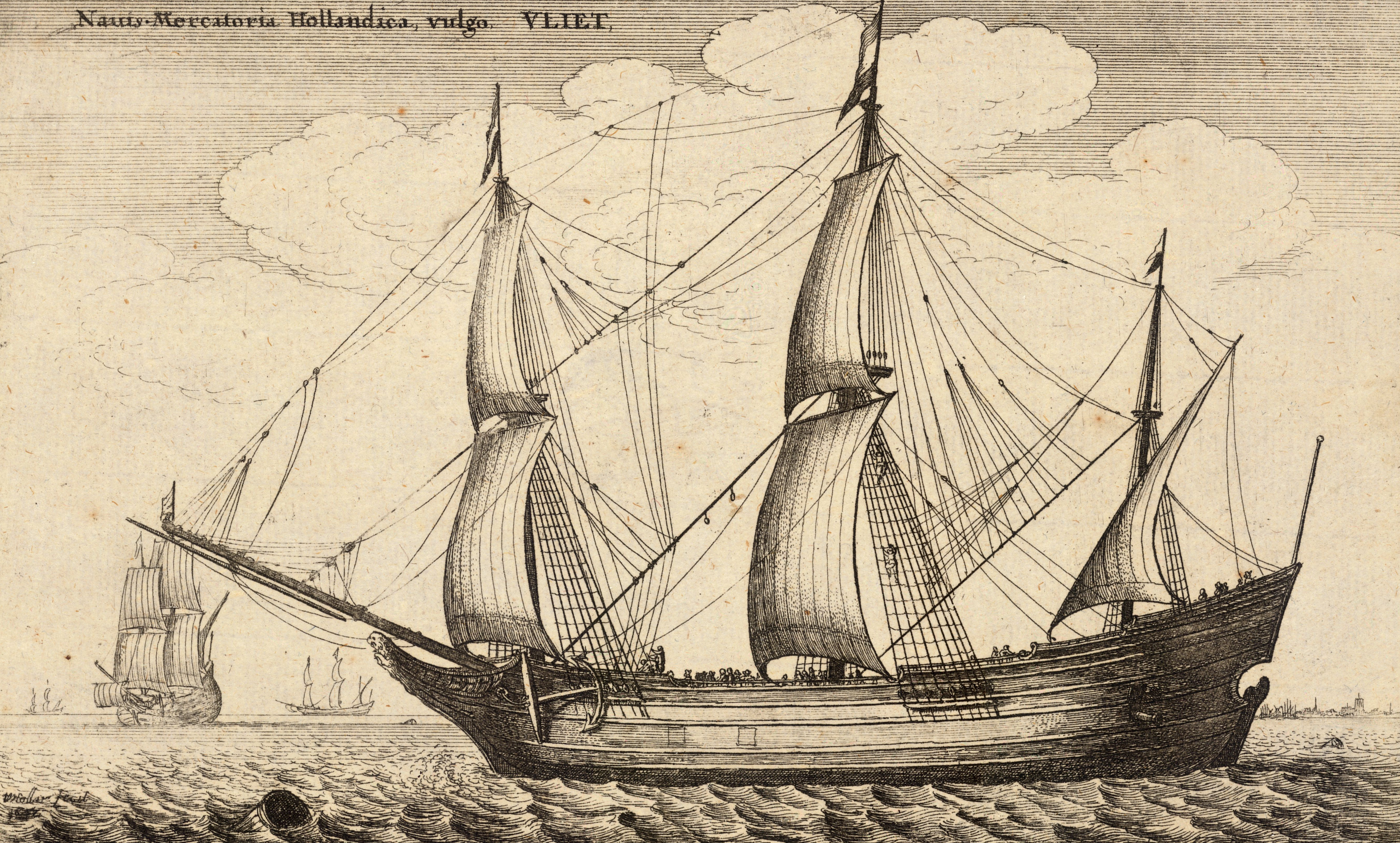
1667 illustration of a Dutch fluyt

A fluyt (archaic Dutch: fluijt "flute"; Dutch pronunciation: [flœyt]) is a Dutch type of sailing vessel originally designed by the shipwrights of Hoorn as a dedicated cargo vessel. Originating in the Dutch Republic in the 16th century, the vessel was designed to facilitate transoceanic delivery with the maximum of space and crew efficiency. Unlike its rivals, it was not built for conversion in wartime to a warship, so it was simpler and cheaper to build and carried twice the cargo, and could be handled by a smaller crew. Construction by specialized shipyards using new tools made it half the cost of rival ships. These factors combined to sharply lower the cost of transportation for Dutch merchants, giving them a major competitive advantage, particularly with bulk goods. The fluyt was a significant factor in the 17th-century rise of the Dutch seaborne empire. In 1670 the Dutch merchant marine totalled 568,000 tons of shipping—about half the European total.

== Ship design ==
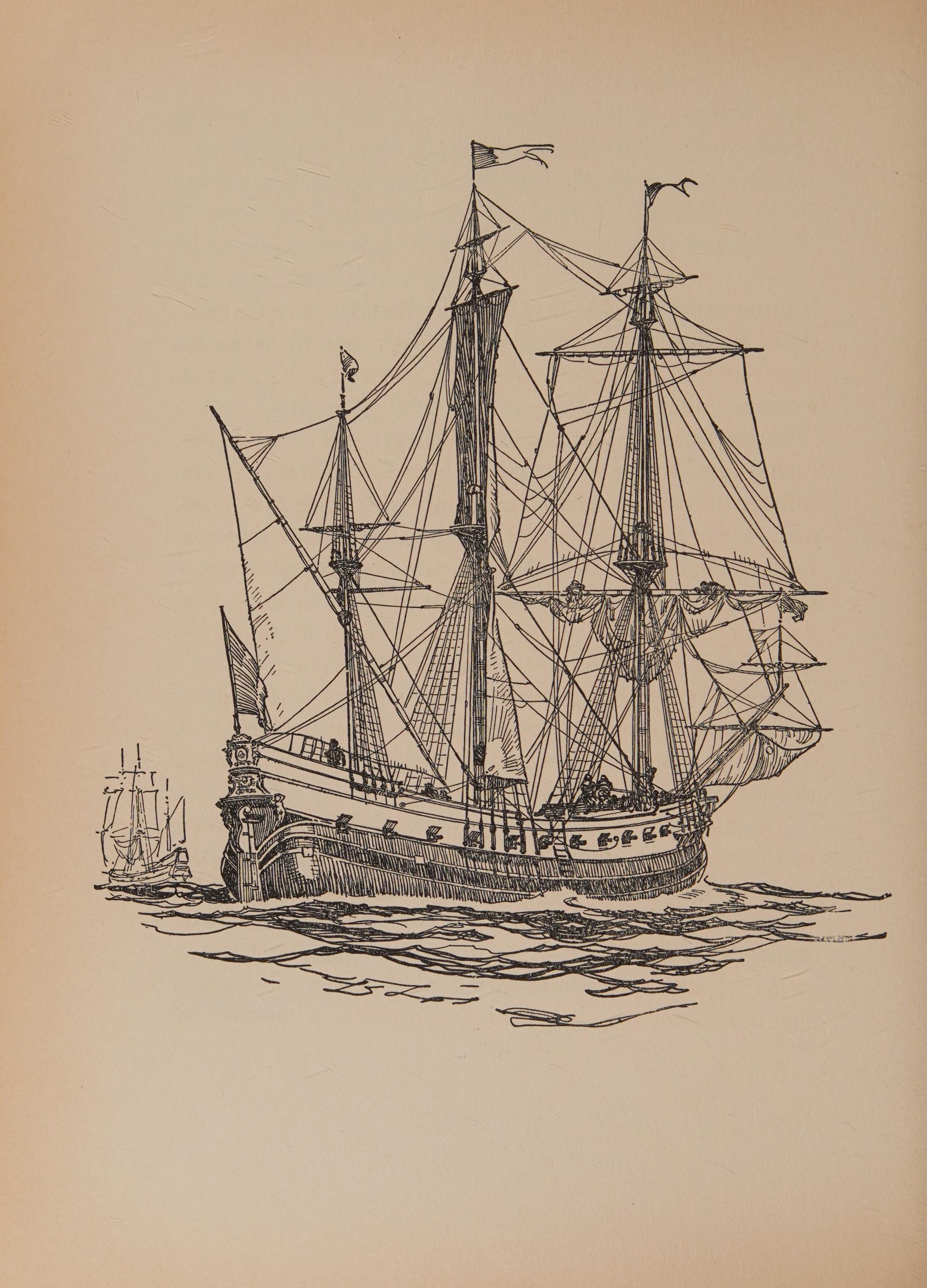
A fluyt; pen-and-ink plate by Gordon Grant from The Book of Old Ships (1924).

The standard fluyt design minimized or completely eliminated its armaments to maximize available cargo space, and used block and tackle extensively to facilitate ship operations. Another advantage of its pear-shape (when viewed from the fore or aft) was a shallow draft which allowed the vessel to bring cargo in and out of ports and up and down rivers which other vessels could not reach. This ship class was credited for making the Dutch more competitive in international trade, and was widely employed by the Dutch East India Company in the 17th and 18th centuries. However, its usefulness caused the fluyt to gain such popularity that similar designs were soon developed by seagoing competitors of the Dutch. For example, the English shipbuilding industry began to adapt the design of the fluyt during the later part of the 17th century as English merchants, seeing how much cheaper Dutch shipping was, acquired Dutch-built ships captured in the Anglo-Dutch wars.

It is a persistent myth that the fluyt was developed to evade Sound Tolls. The toll registers, however, show that during the 70 years from 1562 to 1632 it was a well-established procedure in the Sound for the toll-officers to use the bills of lading to determine the loading-capacities of the vessels passing through. They did not employ any sort of measuring device to assess the width, length, and depth of the vessels and then calculate the size of the ships.

The fluyt was square rigged with two or three masts. When rigged with three masts, the fore and main (front two) masts were square rigged, with the mizzen (rearmost) mast often rigged with a triangular lateen sail, as pictured above. Masts were much higher than those of galleons to allow for greater speed. At times fluyts were also armed and served as auxiliary vessels, which was a common practice in the Baltic Sea.

== French flûte ==
Fluyts were called flûte in the French Navy. By 1680 this term was used for all its large cargo ships regardless of if they were of the Dutch fluyt type.

== The Swan ==
In 2003, Martin Mattenik and Deep Sea Productions, using side scanning sonar, discovered a shipwreck lying on the floor of the Baltic Sea. The wreck was visited five times between 2003 and 2010. The Baltic is unusual in that there is a thick layer of fresh water inhospitable to saltwater-loving shipworms and shipwrecks are protected from the ravages of shipworms. The top of the wreck's rudder is decorated with three flowers which is typical of Dutch-built ships of the era. This ship is believed to be named the Swan due to the sculpted body of a swan found in the wreckage. At the time it was customary to attach a figure depicting the name of the ship to the transom. Dutch fluyts were built and used in the 16th and 17th centuries as a contract-for-hire vessel. England had not yet established its own large-scale shipbuilding industry and the Dutch dominated the market. During the 17th century, English companies leased ships like the Swan to carry colonists to America.

== Replicas ==
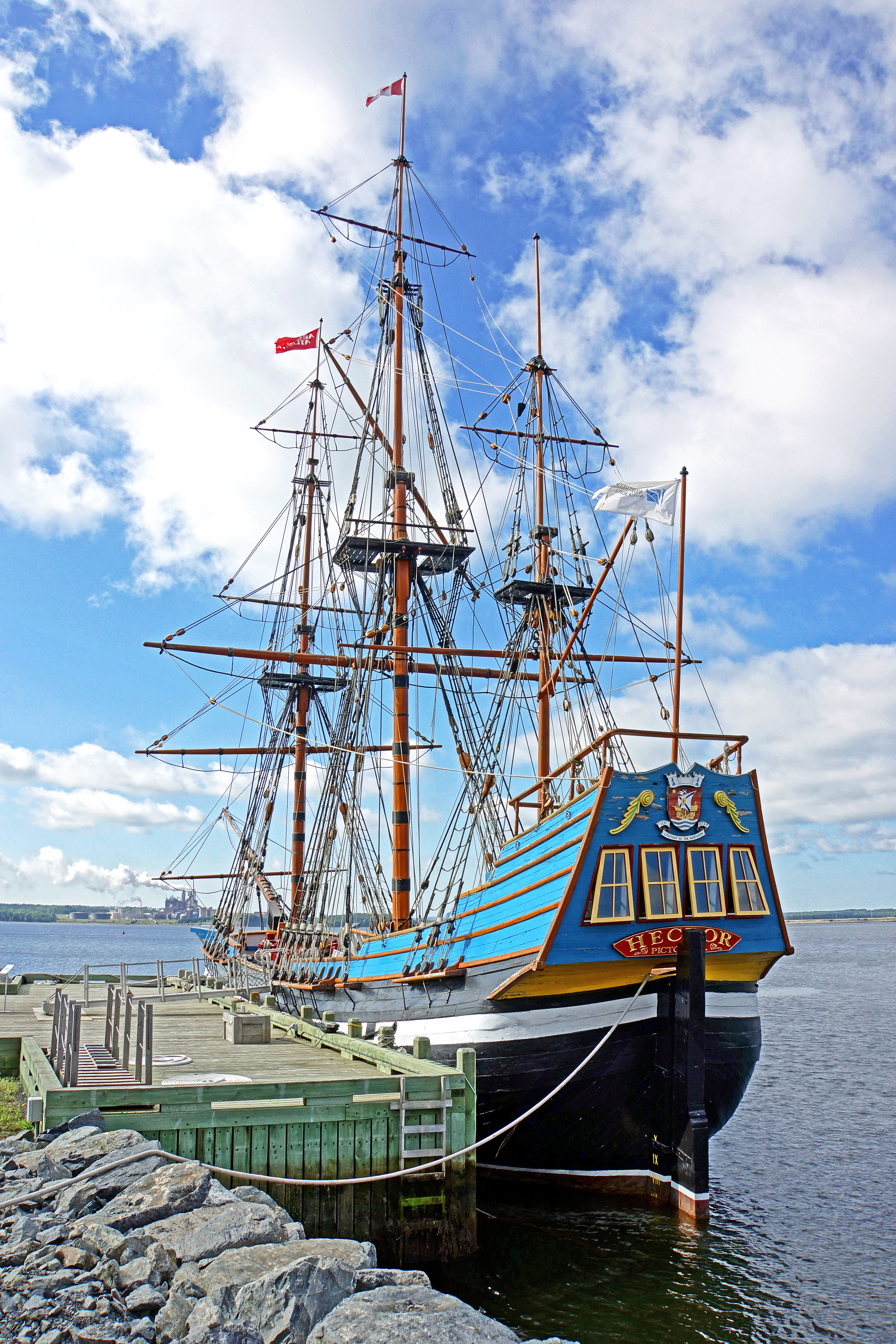
Hector, a replica

The Hector, constructed in Pictou, Nova Scotia, and launched in 2000, is a replica of an early 18th-century fluyt which, in the summer of 1773 carried 189 Scottish immigrants to Nova Scotia. The replica was constructed according to line drawings from the Maritime Museum Rotterdam, and built using traditional shipbuilding techniques. As of 2017, the Hector is operated by the Hector Quay Society and is open to the public.

== See also ==
- En flûte – Reducing a ship's armament to carry more cargo
- Flyboat – European light vessel of Dutch origin
