= Huisduinen =

- Village
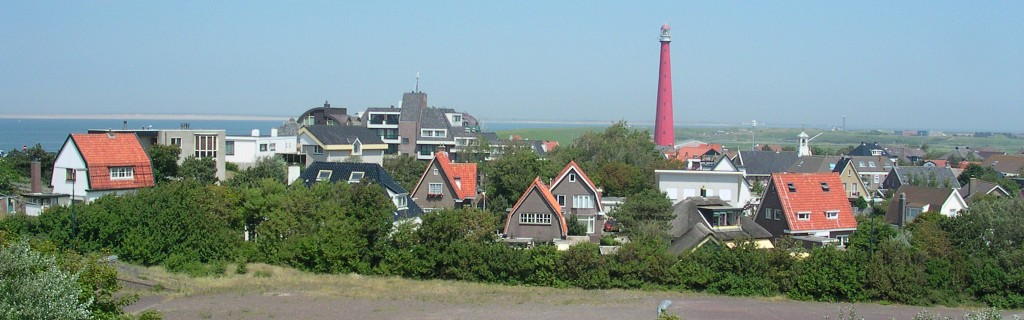
- Huisduinen

- Flag

- Location in the Netherlands Location in the province of North Holland in the Netherlands
- Coordinates: 52°57′8″N 4°43′34″E
- Country: Netherlands
- Province: North Holland
- Municipality: Den Helder

Area
  - Total: 1.98 km^{2} (0.76 sq mi)
- Elevation: 0.4 m (1.3 ft)

Population (2025)
  - Total: 595
  - Density: 301/km^{2} (778/sq mi)
- Time zone: UTC+1 (CET)
  - Summer (DST): UTC+2 (CEST)
- Postal code: 1789
- Dialing code: 0223

Huisduinen (Dutch pronunciation: [ˈɦœyzdœynə(n)]) is a village in the Dutch province of North Holland. It is a part of the municipality of Den Helder, and lies about 2 km west of Den Helder.

== History ==
The village was first mentioned between 918 and 948 as Husidina, and means "house in the dunes". A settlement more westwards had been known to exist in 866, but was lost in the sea in 1170. The second settlement disappeared in 1570. The current settlement was built around a 1574 sconce. In 1610, a dike was constructed to Callantsoog and Huisduinen was no longer an island. The town of Den Helder started to outgrow Huisduinen. In 1673, the Battle of Texel (1673) which is named "Battle of Kijkduin" in Dutch took place near the village.

The Dutch Reformed church is an aisleless church from 1851. Between 1895 and 1896, the church was extensively remodelled. The church contains a wooden model of a whaler from 1787.

The fortress Kijkduin was built by Napoleon in Huisduinen between 1811 and 1813, and served to protect Den Helder. In 1878, a lighthouse was built to the north of the fort. Nowadays, the fort houses a museum.

Huisduinen was home to 327 people in 1840. In 1942, the village was evacuated by the German authorities.

== Gallery ==
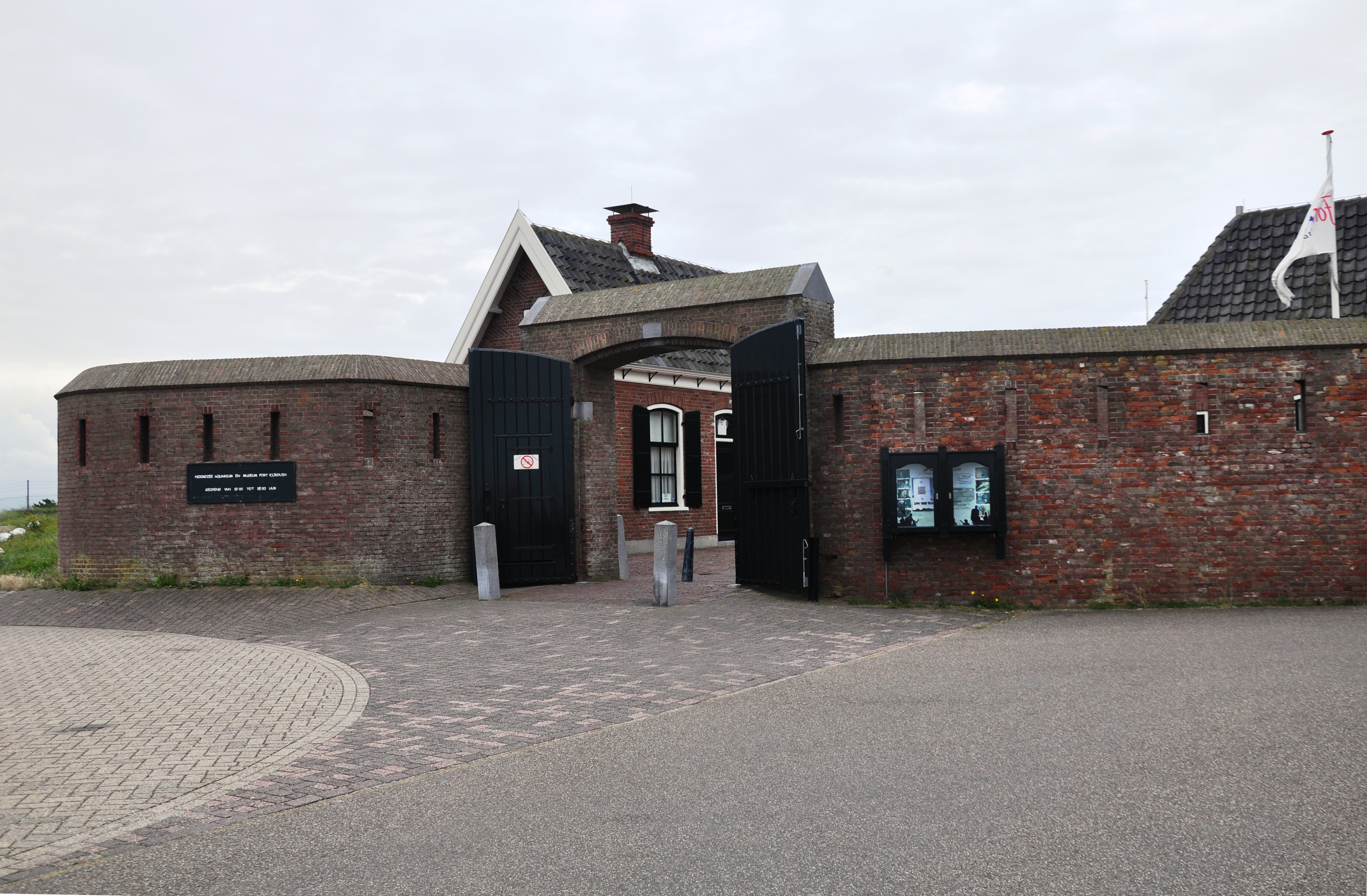
Fort Kijkduin

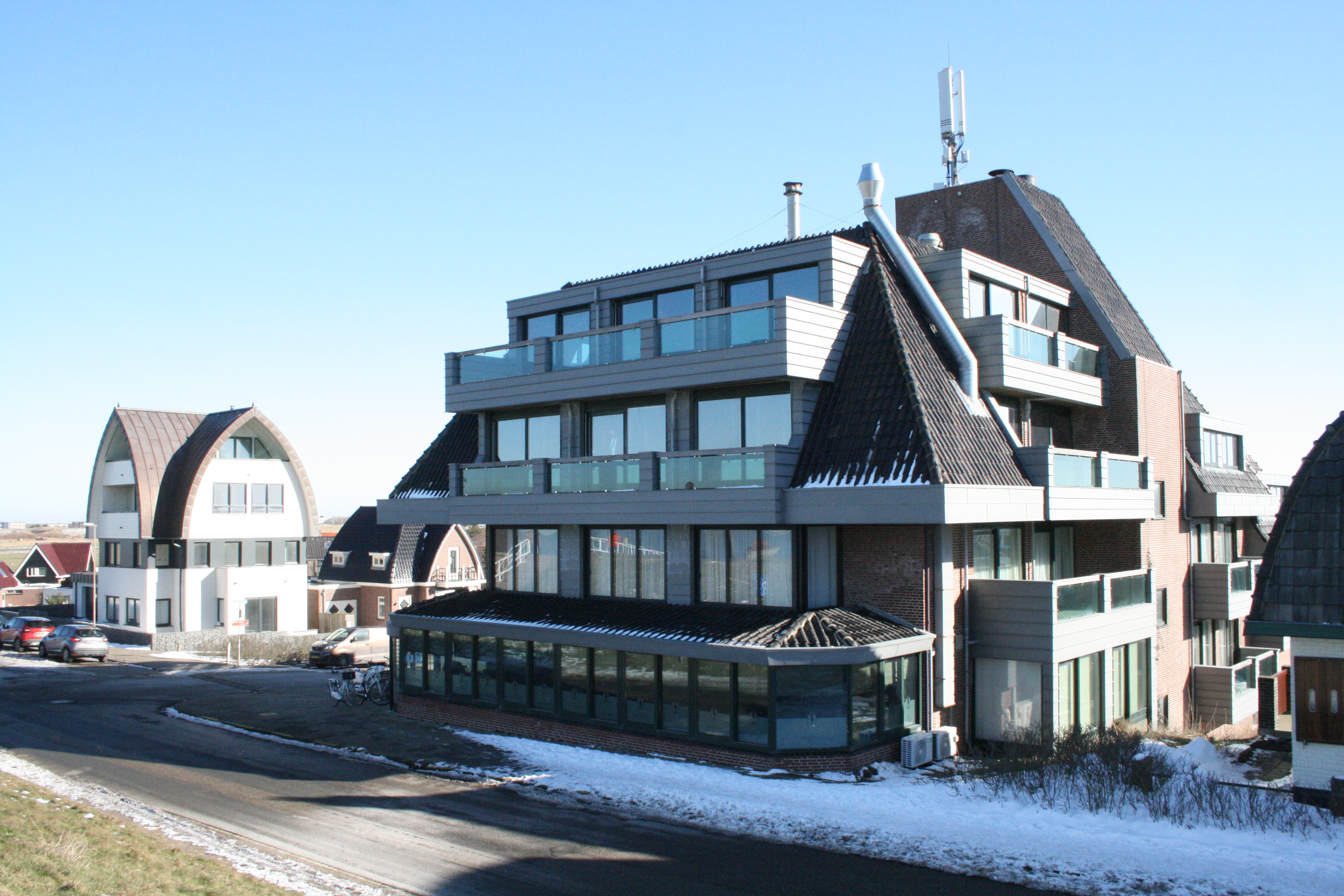
Hotel in Huisduinen

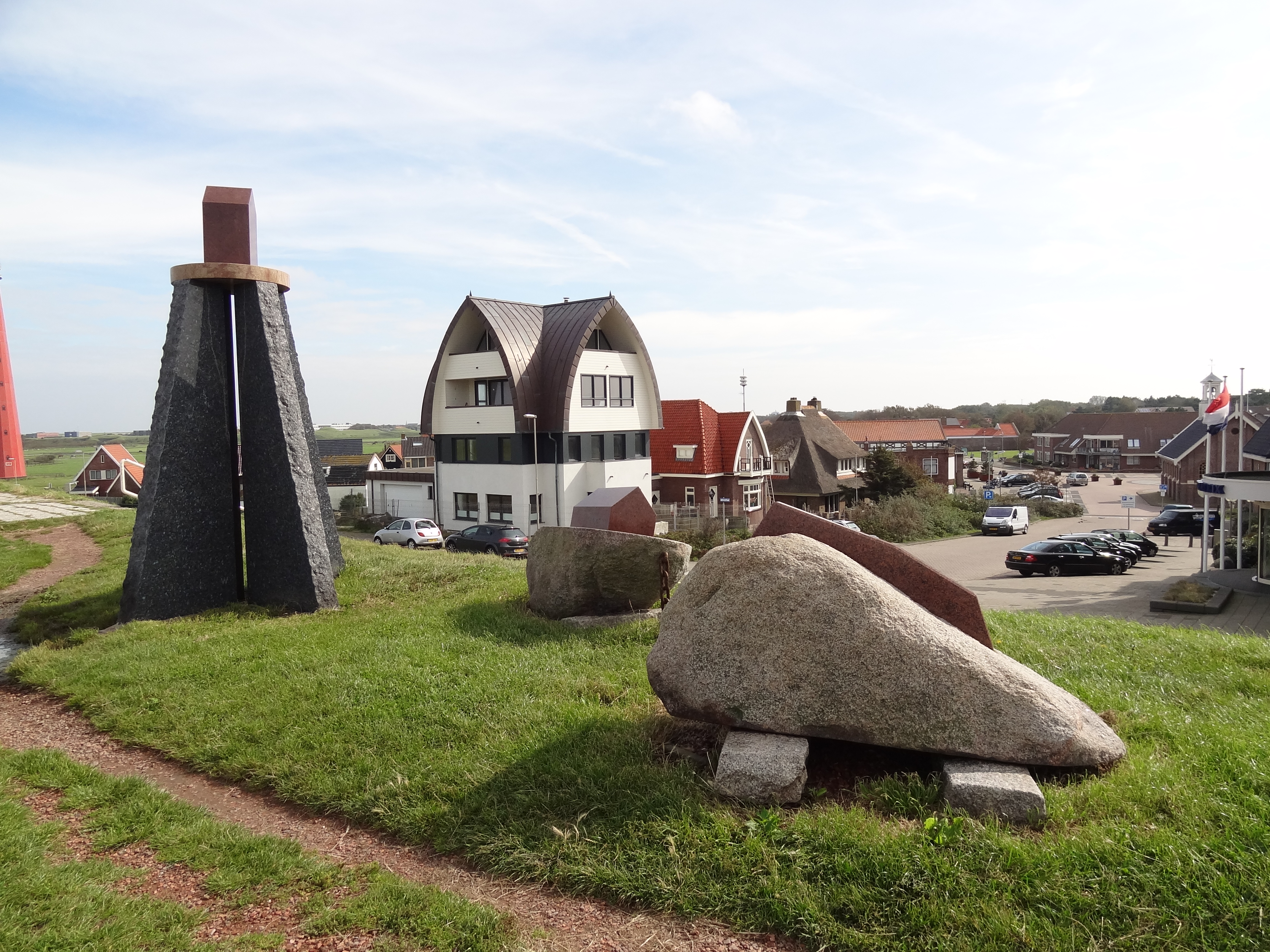
Art on the sea dike

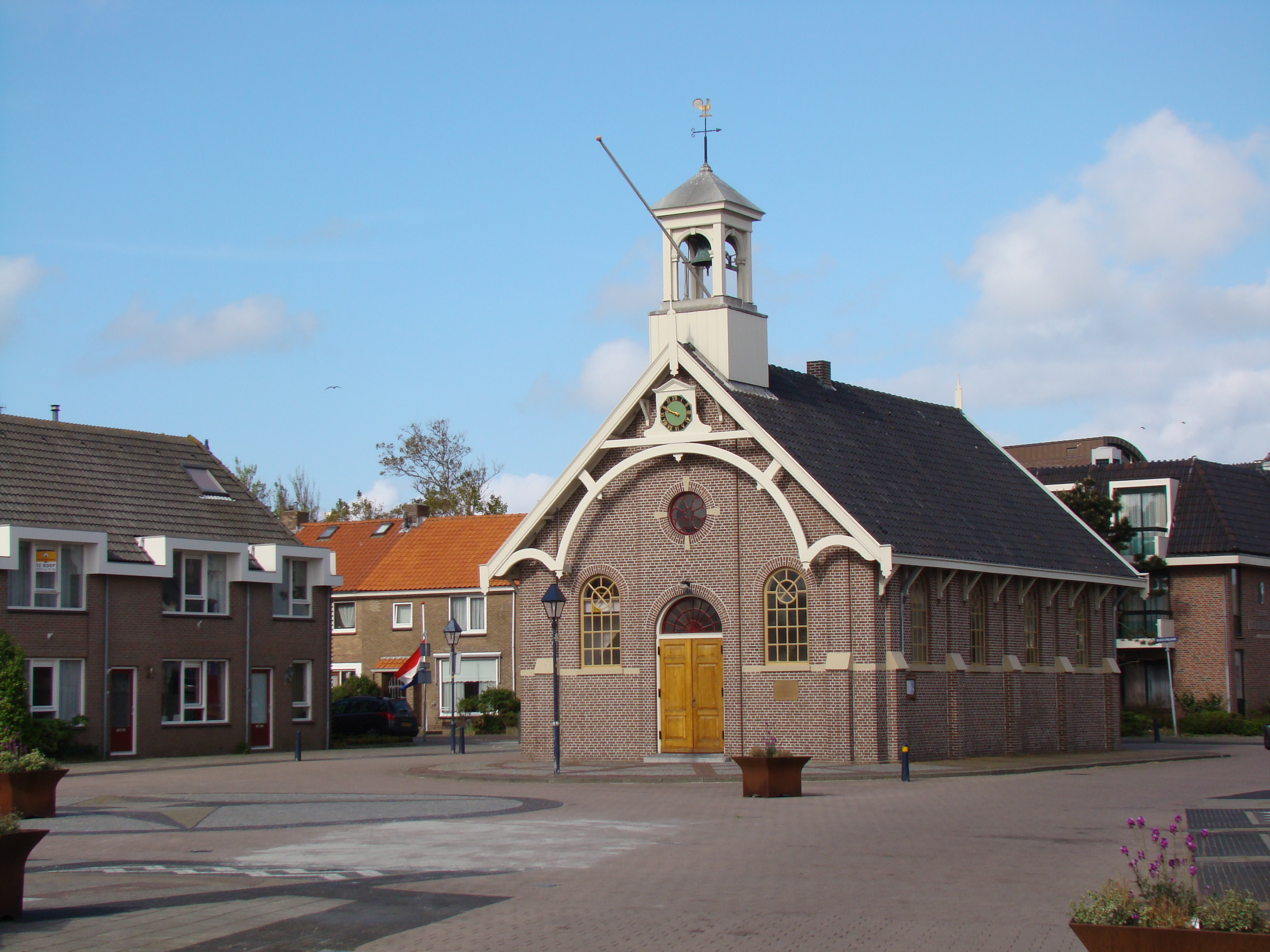
Dutch Reformed church
