= Callantsoog =

- Village
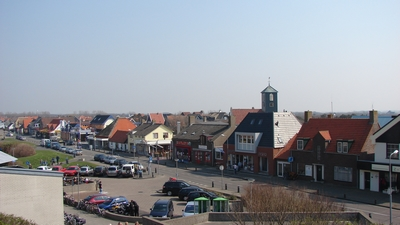
- View on Callantsoog.

- Flag Coat of arms

- Location in the Netherlands Location in the province of North Holland in the Netherlands
- Coordinates: 52°50′N 4°42′E
- Country: Netherlands
- Province: North Holland
- Municipality: Schagen

Area
  - Village: 22.17 km^{2} (8.56 sq mi)
- Elevation: 1.2 m (3.9 ft)

Population (2025)
  - Village: 2,415
  - Density: 108.9/km^{2} (282.1/sq mi)
  - Urban: 1,825
  - Rural: 580
- Time zone: UTC+1 (CET)
  - Summer (DST): UTC+2 (CEST)
- Postal code: 1759
- Dialing code: 0224

Callantsoog (West Frisian: Kallantsouge) is a village in the Dutch province of North Holland. It is a part of the municipality of Schagen, and lies about 18 km south of Den Helder. Callantsoog was a separate municipality until 1990, when it was merged with Zijpe.

== History ==
The village was first mentioned in the late 11th century as Callinge, and means "island of the people of Calla (person)". The oldest settlement had been known to exist in 920, but was lost in the sea in 1170. The second settlement was built on the island 't Oghe and lasted until 1570. Shortly after, the third and current settlement was built further east.

In the 1799 Battle of Callantsoog, the landing of 12 thousand British soldiers on the beaches north of the town launched the Anglo-Russian invasion of Holland, and triggered the mutiny or surrender of a squadron of Dutch warships.

The Dutch Reformed church is a double aisled church built between 1580 and 1581 using material from the flooded earlier church. It has a bell dating from 1491.

Callantsoog was to 187 people in 1840. During the early 20th century, Callantsoog started to develop as a tourist resort. In 1942, it became part of the Atlantic Wall. In 1943, a munition depot exploded destroying the houses near the sea. It was an independent municipality until 1990 when it was merged into Zijpe. In 2013, it became part of the municipality of Schagen.

Callantsoog has the oldest official nude beach of the country, dating from 1973. It is a sandy beach 1.5 kilometres (0.93 mi) to the south.

== Gallery ==
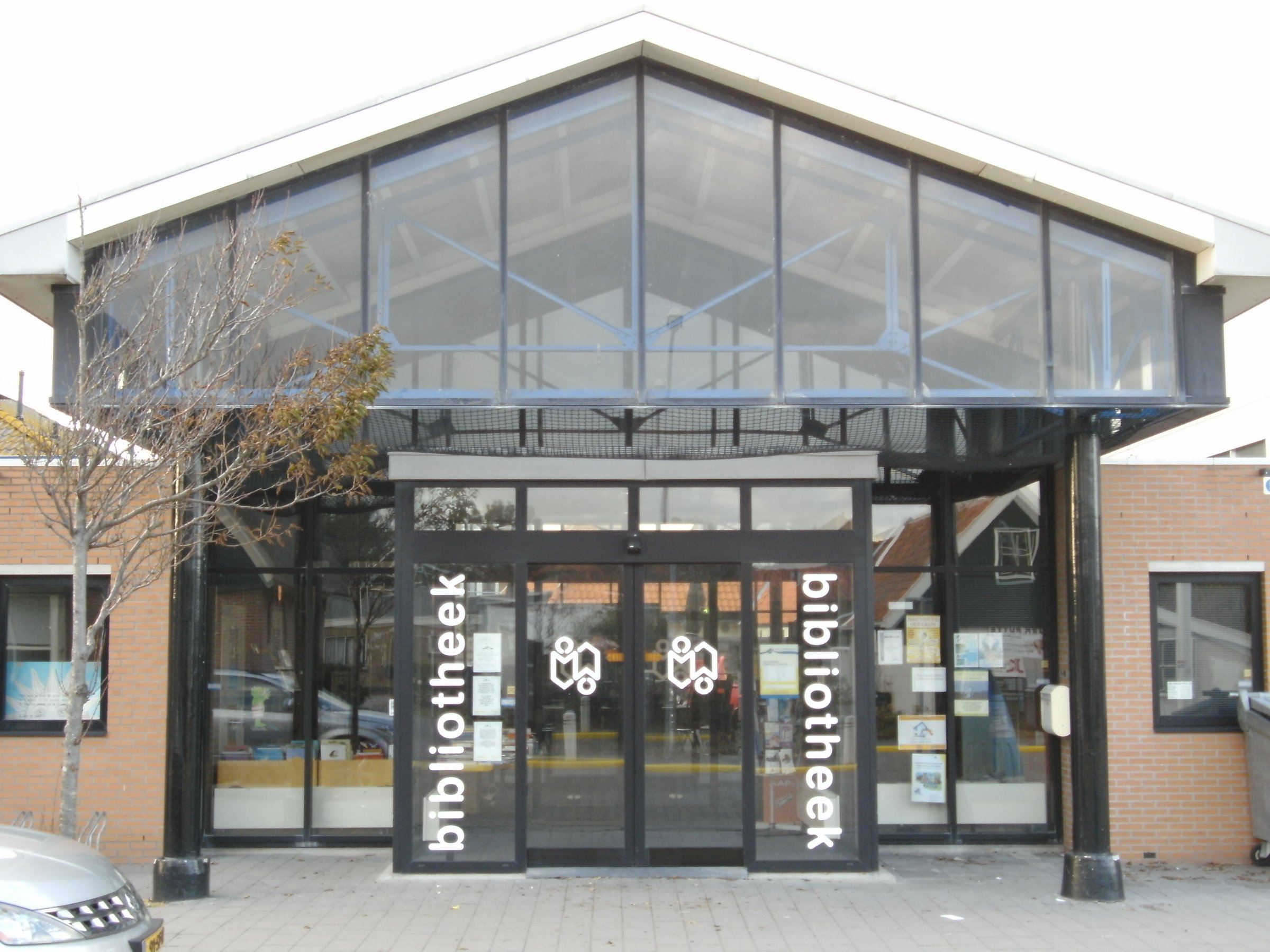
Library of Callantsoog

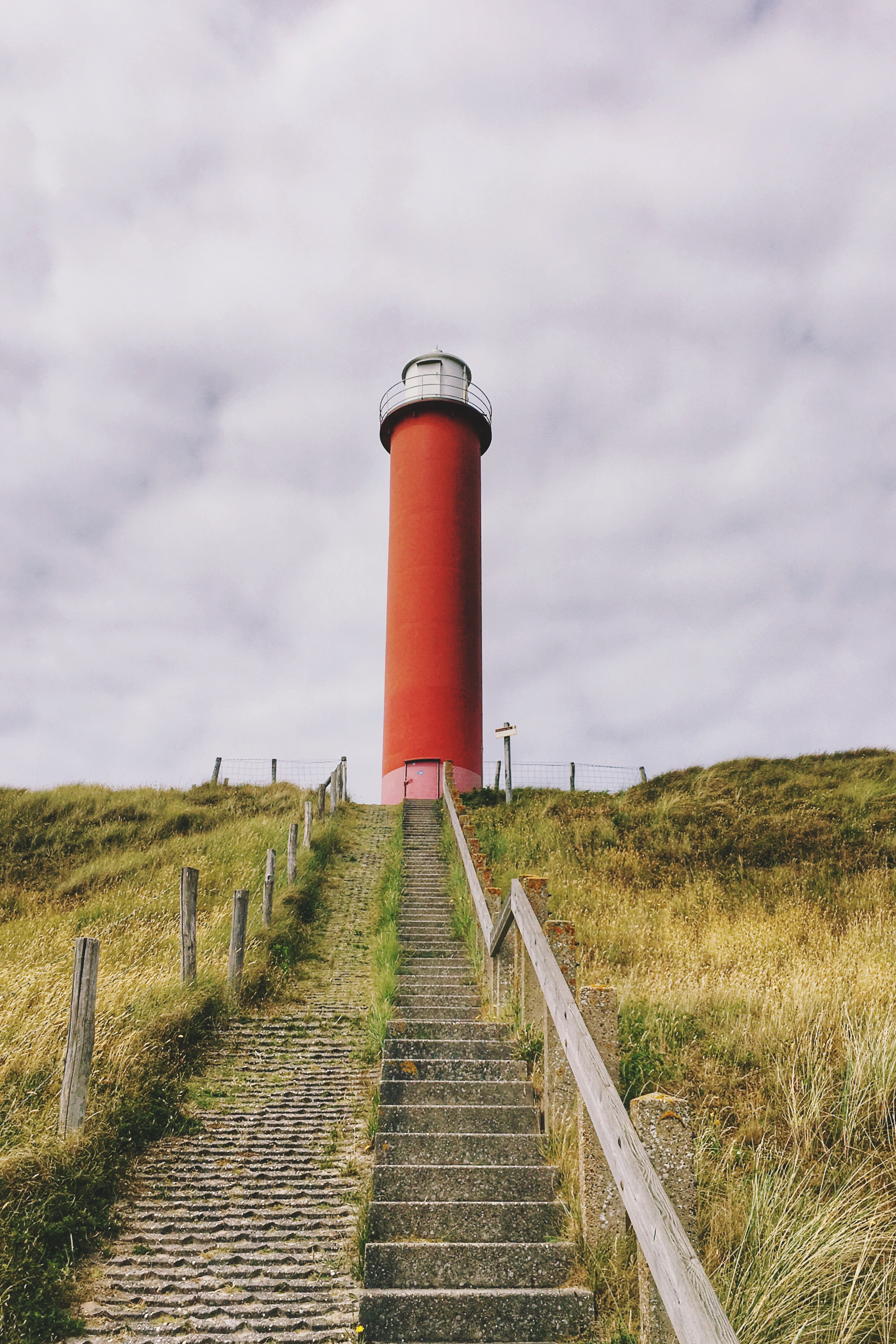
Lighthouse

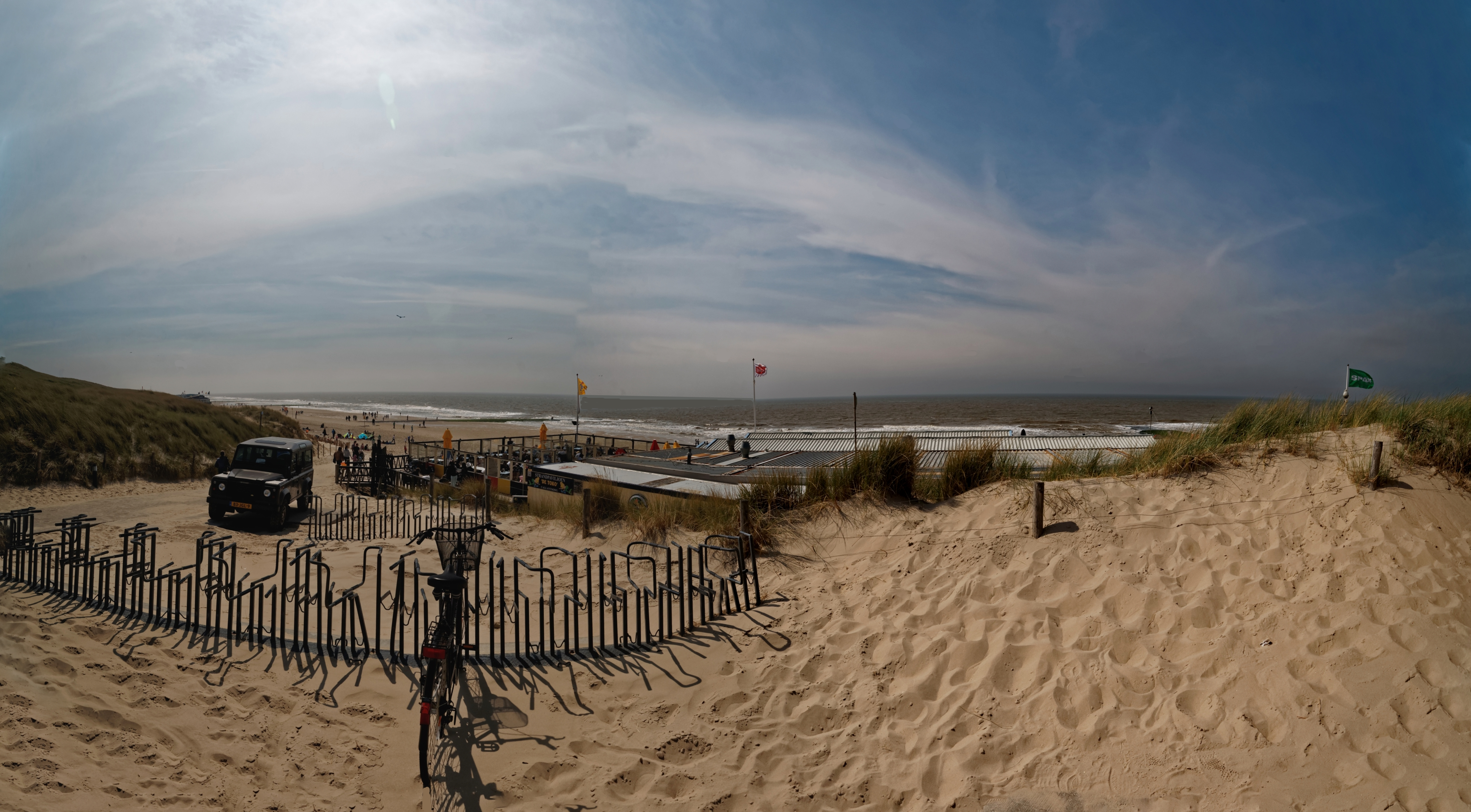
Beach view

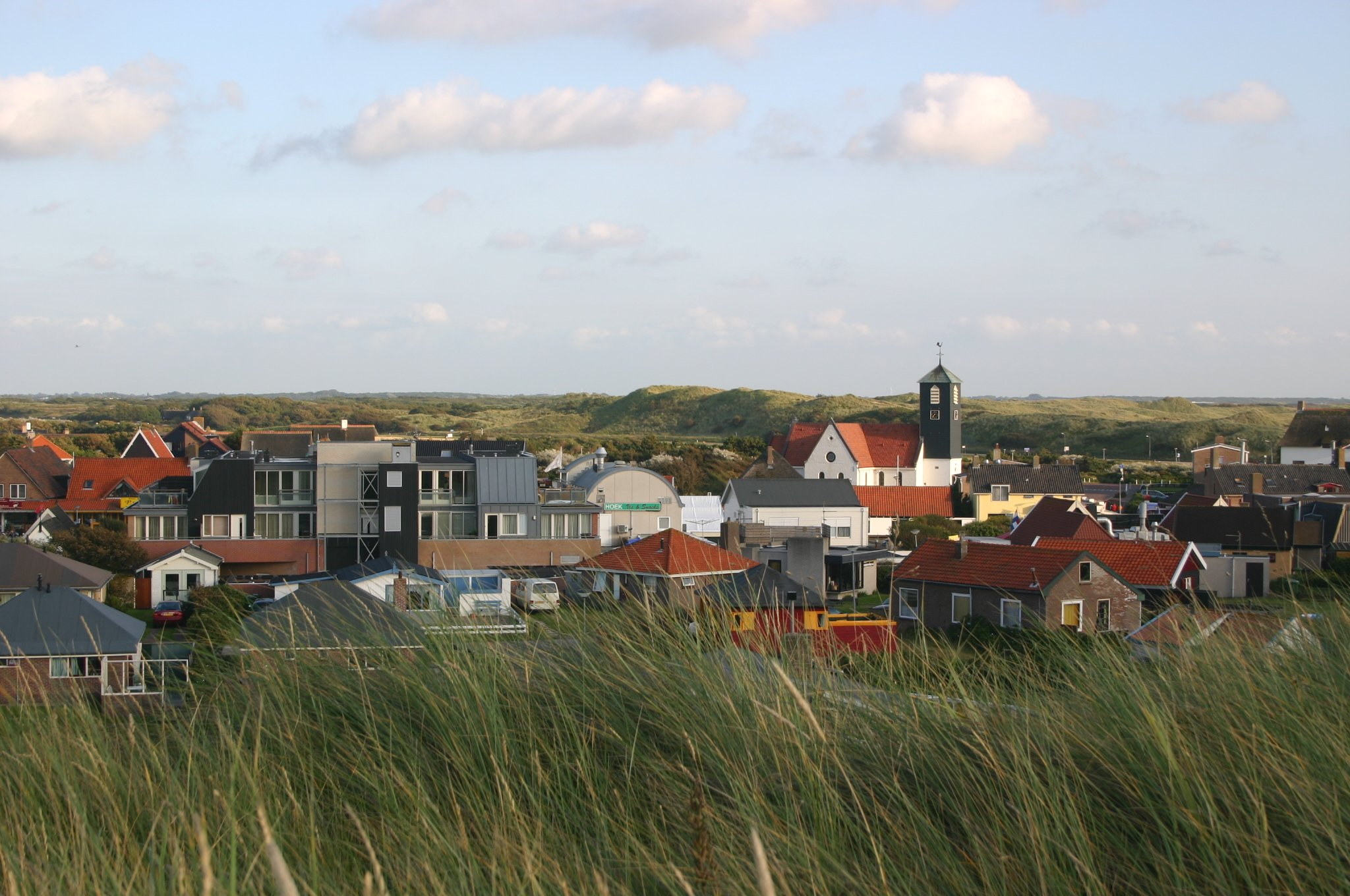
View from the dunes
