= Kirvi =

Mountain in the Faroe Islands

Coordinates: 61.4387°N 6.7826°W

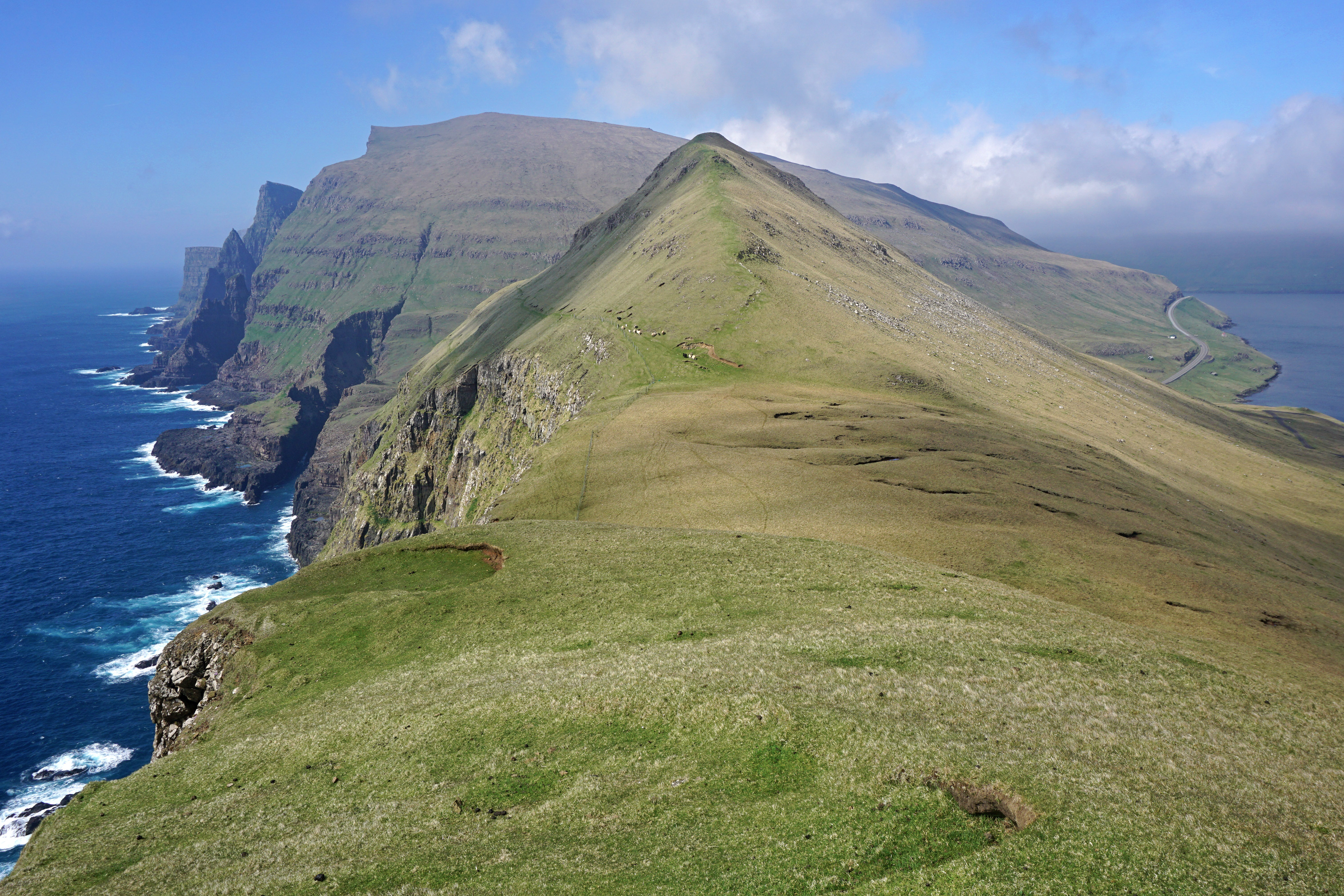
Kirvi in May 2019.

Kirvi is a mountain in Suðuroy, near the village Lopra. Kirvi is 236m high and its shape resembles that of a pyramid. The mountain is visible from the village Lopra. The top of the mountain is called Kirviskollur. The mountain is located in the municipality of Sumba.

== Geology ==
Kirvi, like much of Suðuroy, is formed from volcanic basalt layers, a result of ancient volcanic activity that shaped the Faroe Islands millions of years ago during the Paleogene period. The mountain’s relatively steep, pointed profile suggests slower erosion compared to surrounding formations, contributing to its iconic pyramid-like appearance.

== Nearby Landmarks ==
Kirvi is located not far from several notable sites:

Beinisvørð, one of the highest sea cliffs in Suðuroy (470 meters), lies to the northwest and offers dramatic views over the ocean.

The village of Sumba, the southernmost settlement in the Faroe Islands, is within the same municipality and known for its rugged beauty and cultural events.

Akraberg, the southern tip of Suðuroy, hosts a lighthouse and historical ruins and is often visited in combination with a hike up Kirvi.

== Gallery ==
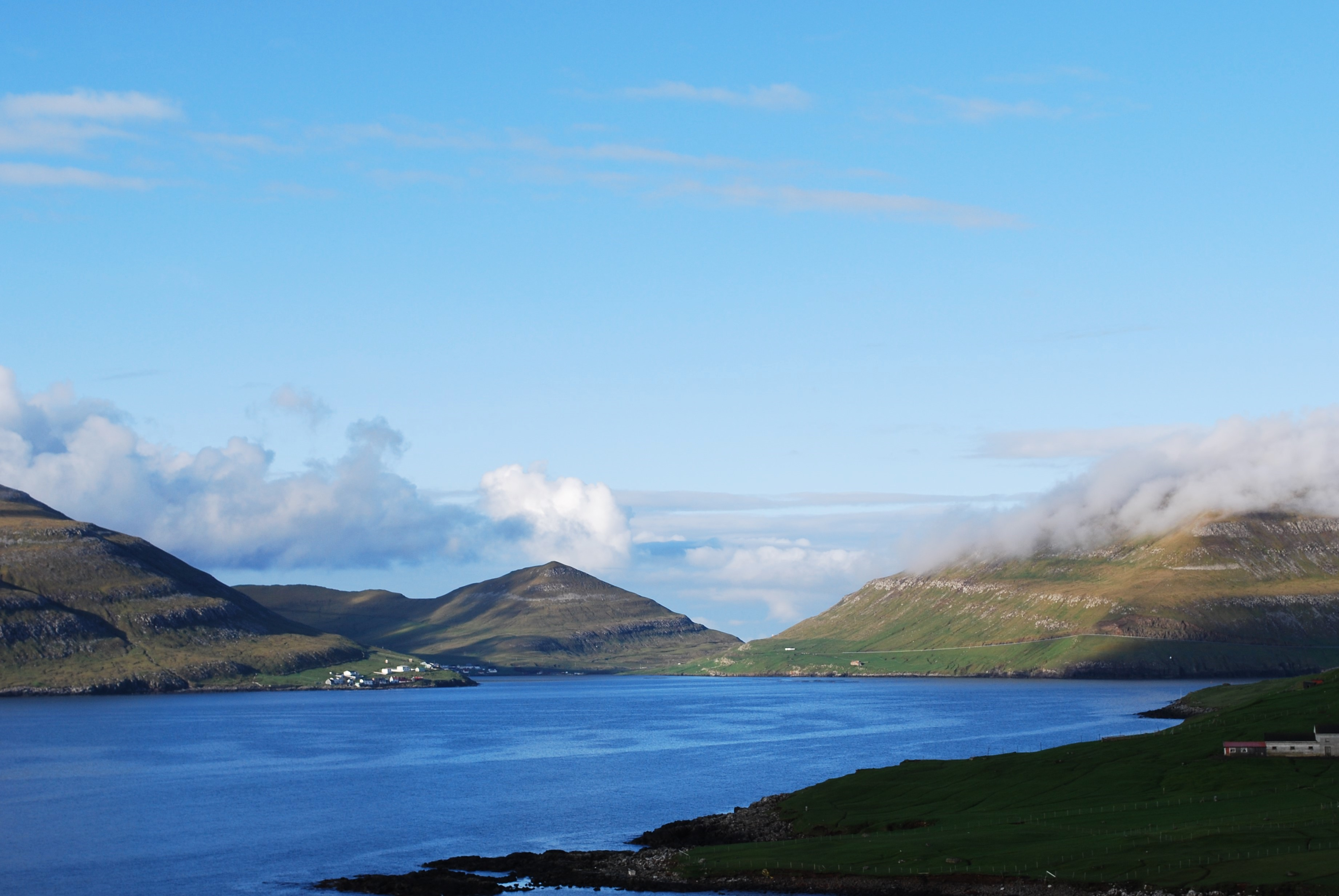
Kirvi seen from Porkeri

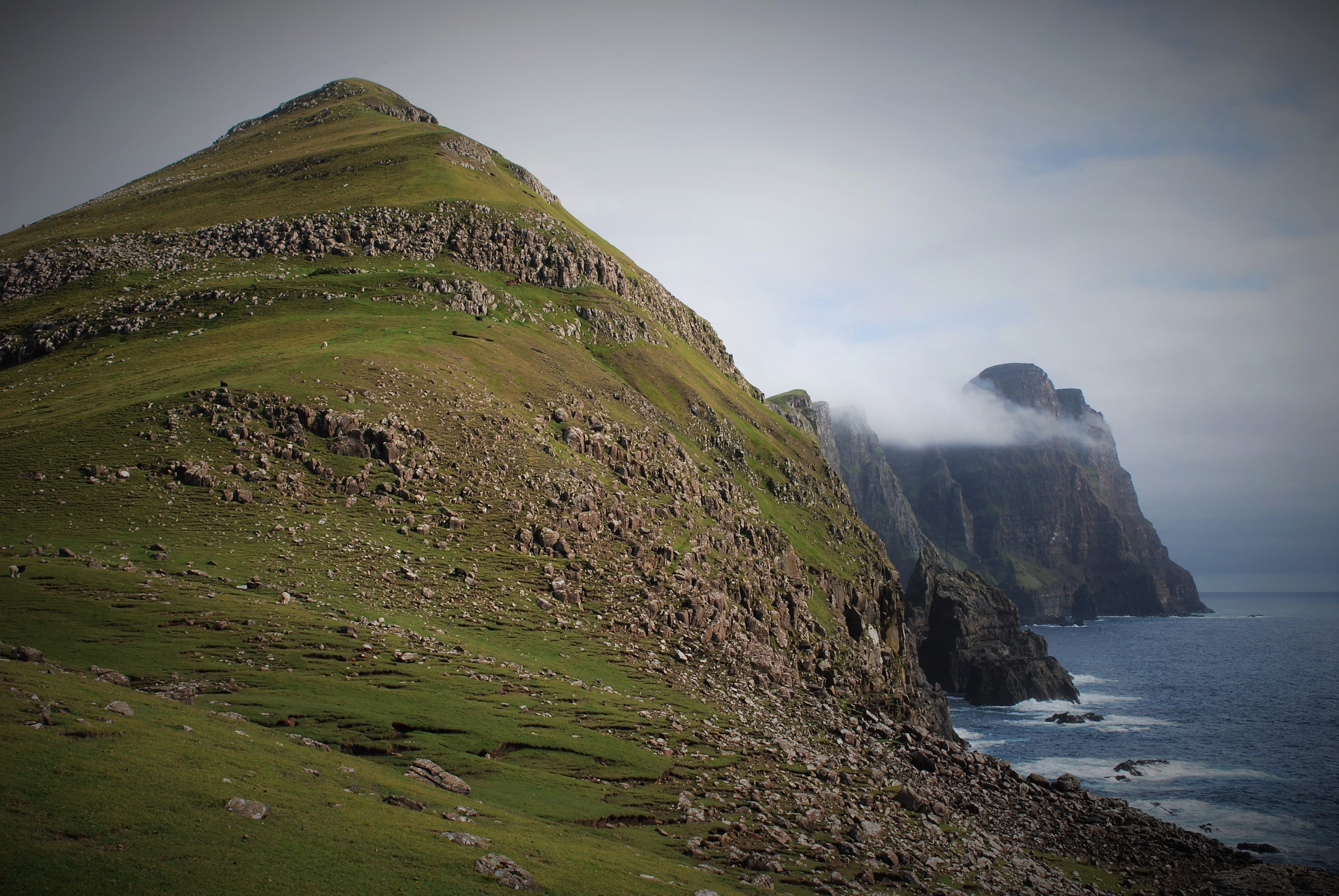
Kirvi, right the cliff Beinisvørð

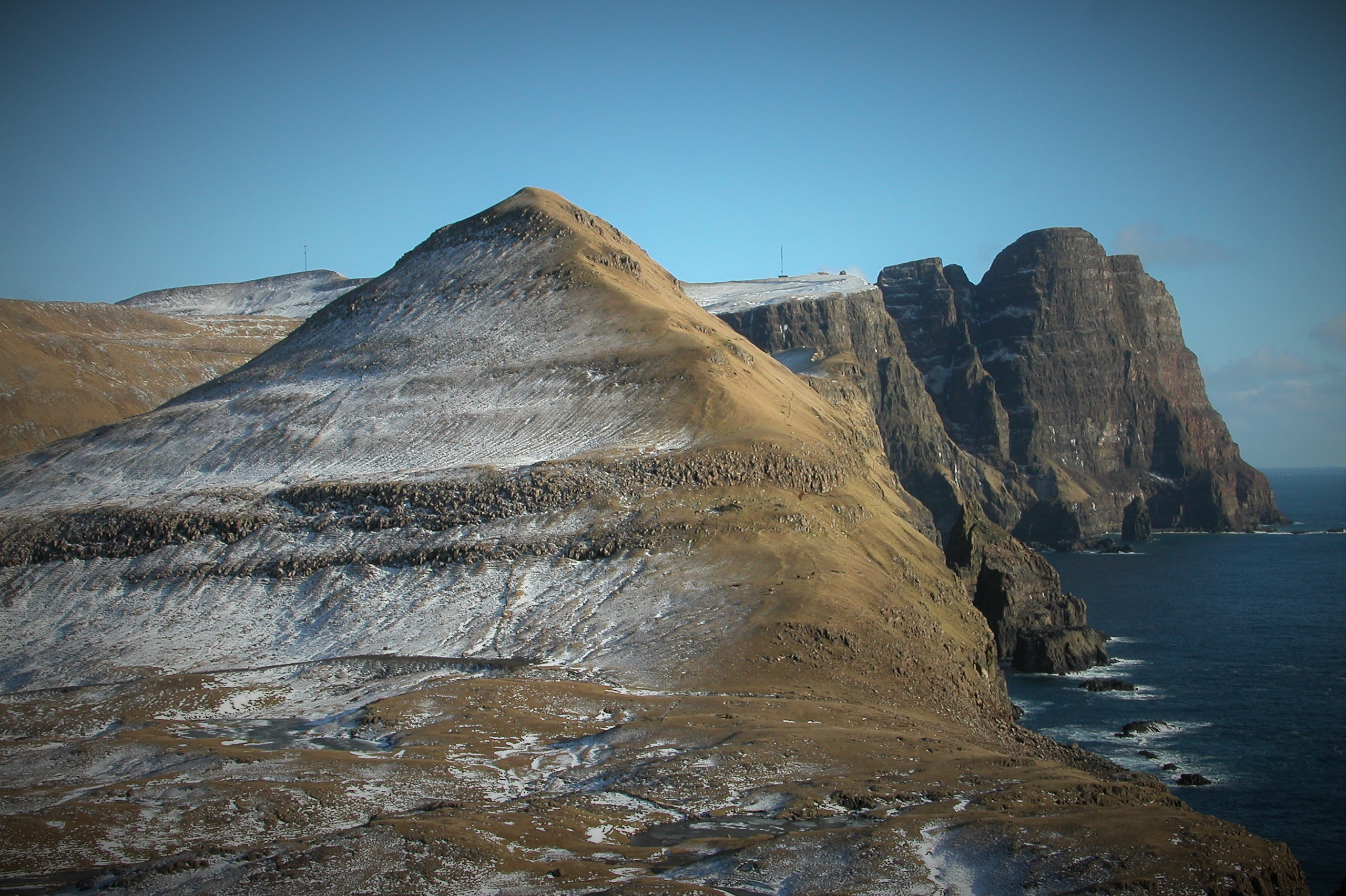
Kirvi is in the center of this photo

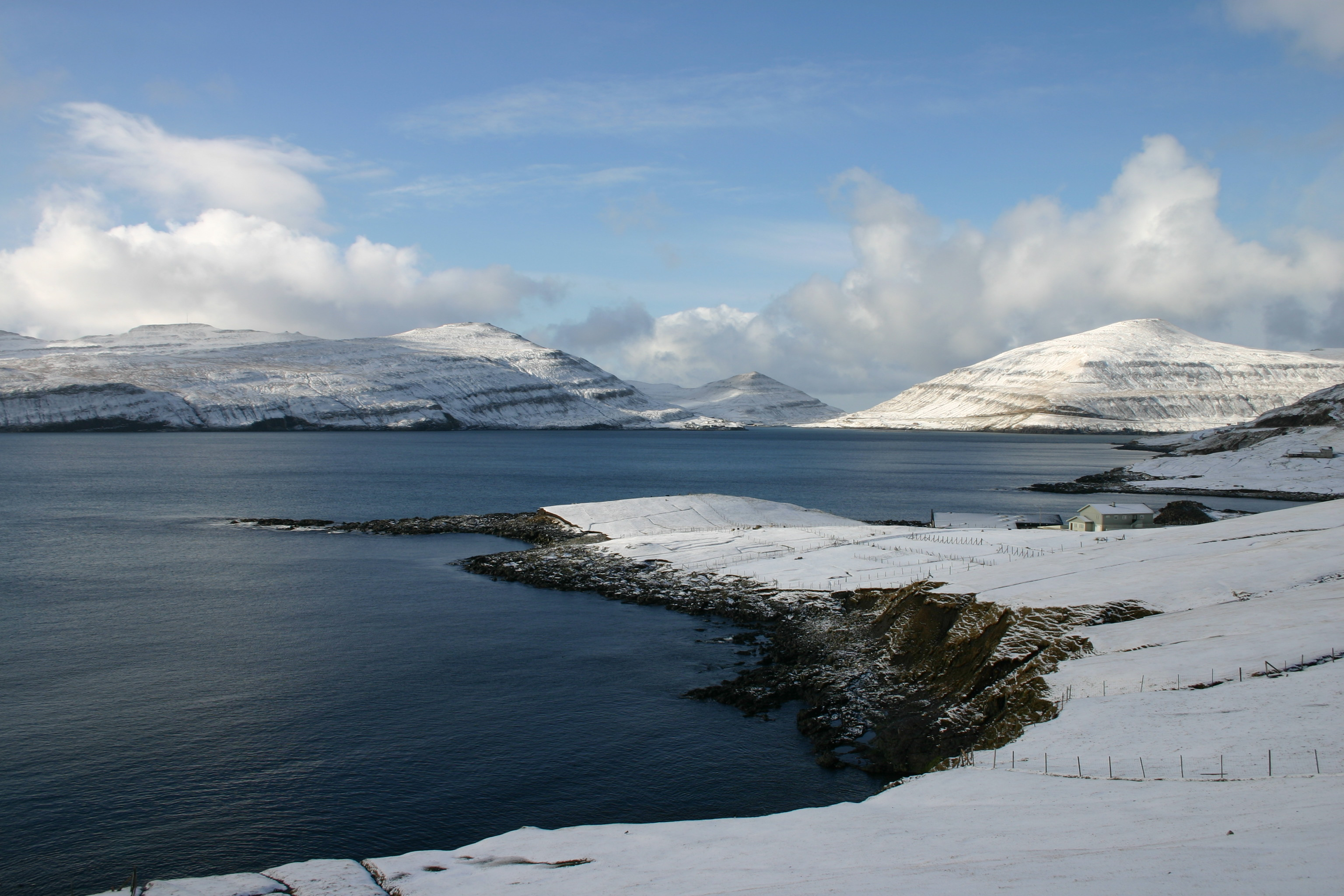
View from Porkeri towards Lopra and Akrar
