= Nes, Vágur =

Nes
- Village
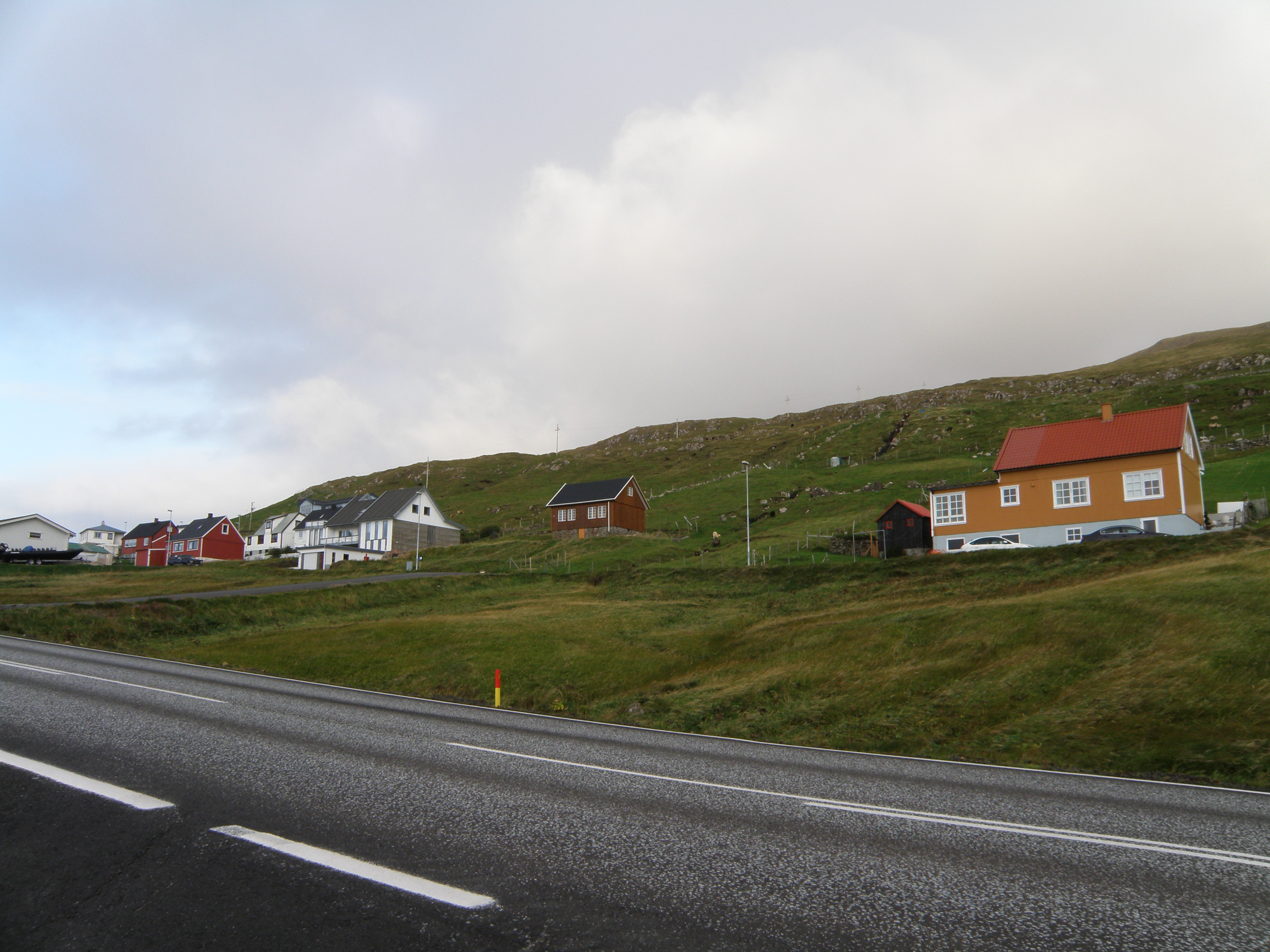
- Nes, seen from the main road between Porkeri and Vágur

- Location in the Faroe Islands
- Coordinates: 61°28′20″N 6°45′33″W
- State: Kingdom of Denmark
- Constituent country: Faroe Islands
- Island: Suðuroy
- Municipality: Vágs kommuna

Population (1 January 2006)
  - Total: 35
- Time zone: GMT
  - Summer (DST): UTC+1 (EST)
- Postal code: FO 925
- Climate: Cfc

Nes (Danish: Næs) is a village on the Faroese island of Suðuroy located in the municipality of Vágur (Vágs kommuna). It is located west of Porkeri and east of Vágur.

It should not be confused with another village by the same name on Eysturoy (see Nes, Eysturoy). There is another village in Suðuroy with the same name, it is located on the southern side of the bay of Hvalba. Nes means cape in the Faroese language.

== Artist Ruth Smith Lived in Nes ==
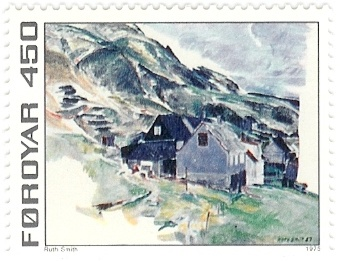
Faroese stamp illustrated with one of Ruth Smith's paintings.

One of the most famous artists of the Faroe Islands was Ruth Smith (1913–1958), who lived in the small village of Nes in the last years of her life. Several of her artworks show scenes from Nes. Some of them can be seen in the Ruth Smith Art Museum in Vágur, and some in Listasavn Føroya in Tórshavn.

== View to Beinisvørð from Nes ==
Nes lies beside the fjord of Vágsfjørður. From Nes one gets a view towards south to two other villages, which are on the other side of the fjords of Vágsfjørður and Lopransfjørður. These villages are Akrar and Lopra. One can also see the promontory sea cliff Beinisvørð, which rises 470 metres above the sea; the top of it rises above the village of Lopra.

== See also ==
- List of towns in the Faroe Islands
