= Vágsfjørður =

Fjord on the island of Suðuroy in the Faroe Islands

Coordinates: 61°27′45″N 6°46′11″W

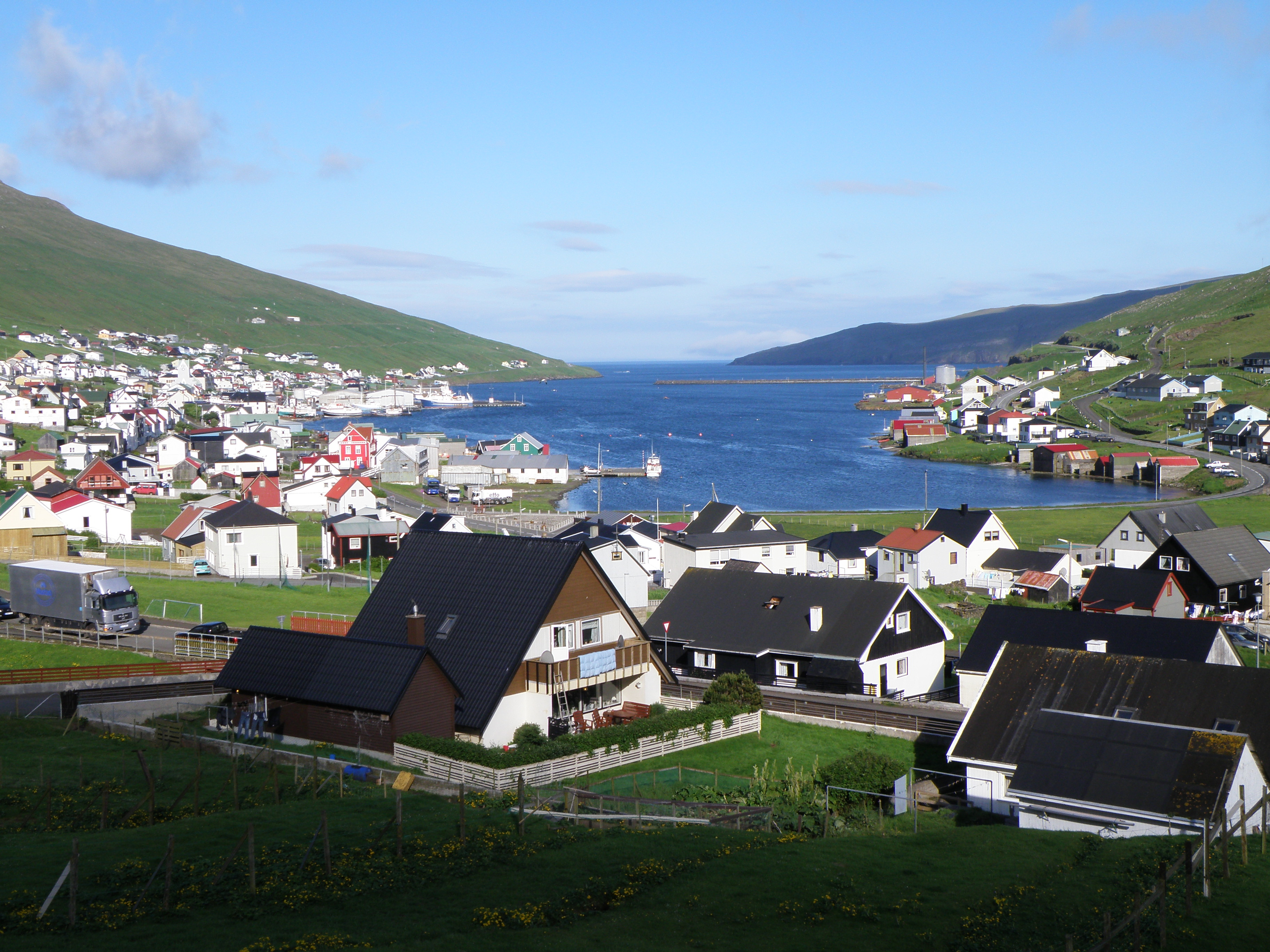
Vágur and Vágsfjørður, view towards east.

Vágsfjørður is a fjord on the island of Suðuroy in the Faroe Islands. The fjord is located in the southern part and on the eastern side of the island. The distance between the east and the west coast of Suðuroy is very short from Vágsfjørður to Vágseiði. Between the fjord and Vágseiði is a lake which is called Vatnið (The Lake). There are five villages around the fjord. In the bottom of the fjord is Vágur, which is one of the largest of the villages in Suðuroy. Further east on the northern side of the fjord is Porkeri, in between Vágur and Porkeri is the small village Nes, where a famous artist Ruth Smith lived. She drowned while swimming in Vágsfjørður at the age of 45.

On the southern side of Vágsfjørður is Lopransfjørður, where the village Lopra is located along with a small bay called Ónavík. Less than one kilometer from the bay of Ónavík is Lopranseiði on the west coast of Suðuroy. Further south of Lopransfjørður and at the beginning of Vágsfjørður is a small village called Akrar.

== The Harbour of Vágur ==
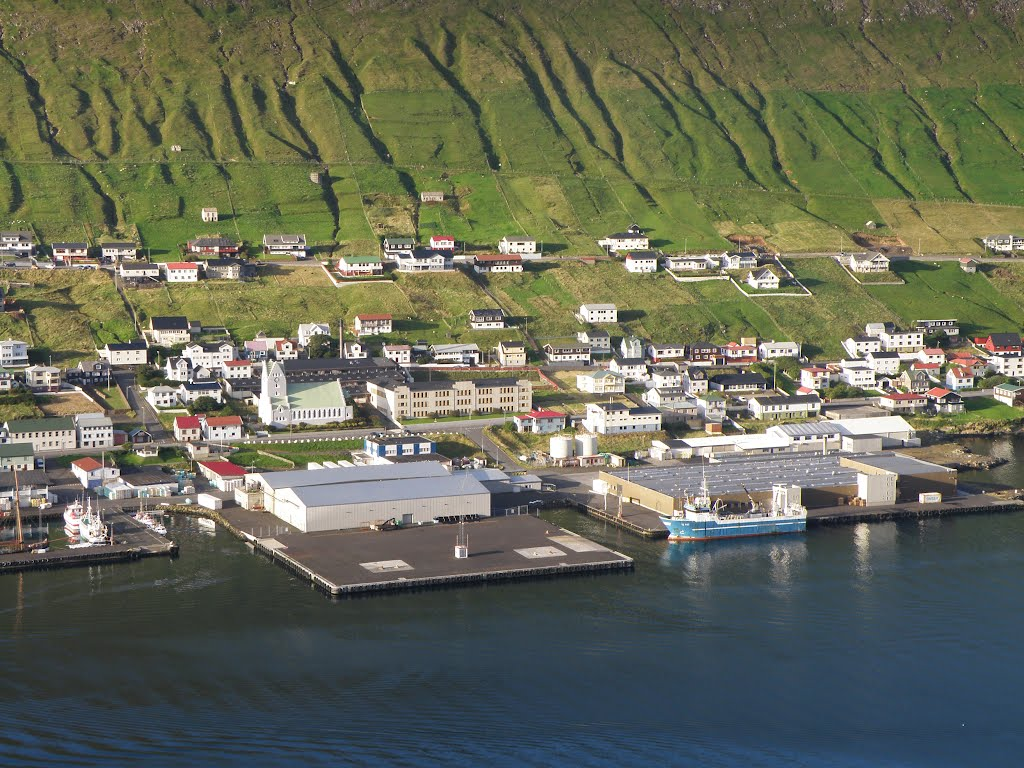
The harbour and Vágsfjørður.

Vágs Havn is the harbour of Vágur. The fjord is 10–15 metres deep where the harbour is. The municipality of Vágur dredged it deeper in 2004, which was a big investment. There are fish factories in the harbour. There is also a ferry port, where the ferry MS Smyril used to sail to a few times every week, now it only comes to Vágur once every three weeks in order to bunker (refuel) from the Vágsverkið of SEV, which is on the south side of the fjord. When the ferry comes to bunker, Smyril first arrives to the port at the northern side in order to let people and cars on shore, after that the ferry sails across the fjord to bunker. After the bunkering, the ferry sails across the fjord again in order to take passengers and cars and cargo on board. Smyril's port in Suðuroy is on Krambatangi in Tvøroyri municipality since the arrival of the current ferry in 2005.

In 2015 the harbour of Vágur was used by ships from the oil industry in Norway, a supply ship and a research and survey vessel, while waiting for new tasks.

== Vágsverkið ==
Vágsverkið, also called SEV-verkið, was built in 1982 by SEV. It is a 13 MW HFO-diesel power plant that produces electricity only for the island of Suðuroy along with the 3.3 MW hydro electric power plant in Botnur, the 6.3 MW Porkeri wind turbines and the reserve diesel power plant in Trongisvágur.

== Photos ==
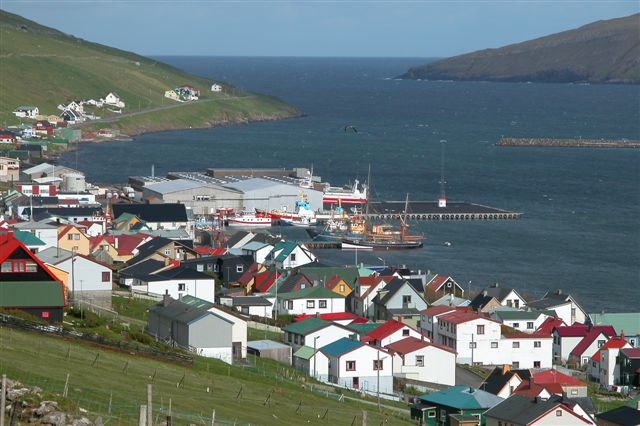
Vágur and Vágsfjørður, view to the harbour towards east.

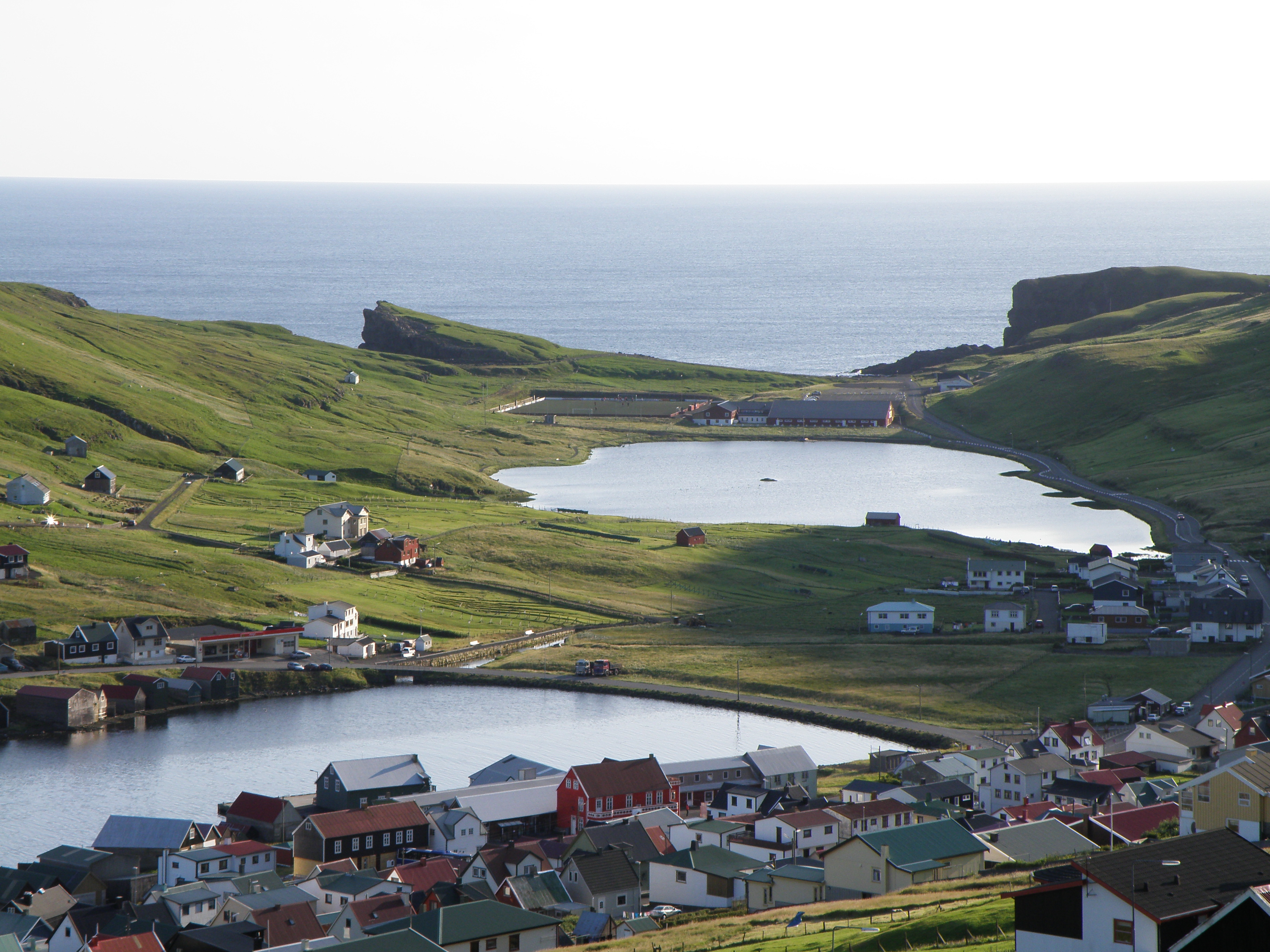
Vágur and the western part of Vágsfjørður. Further west is the lake Vatnið and Vágseiði on the west coast.

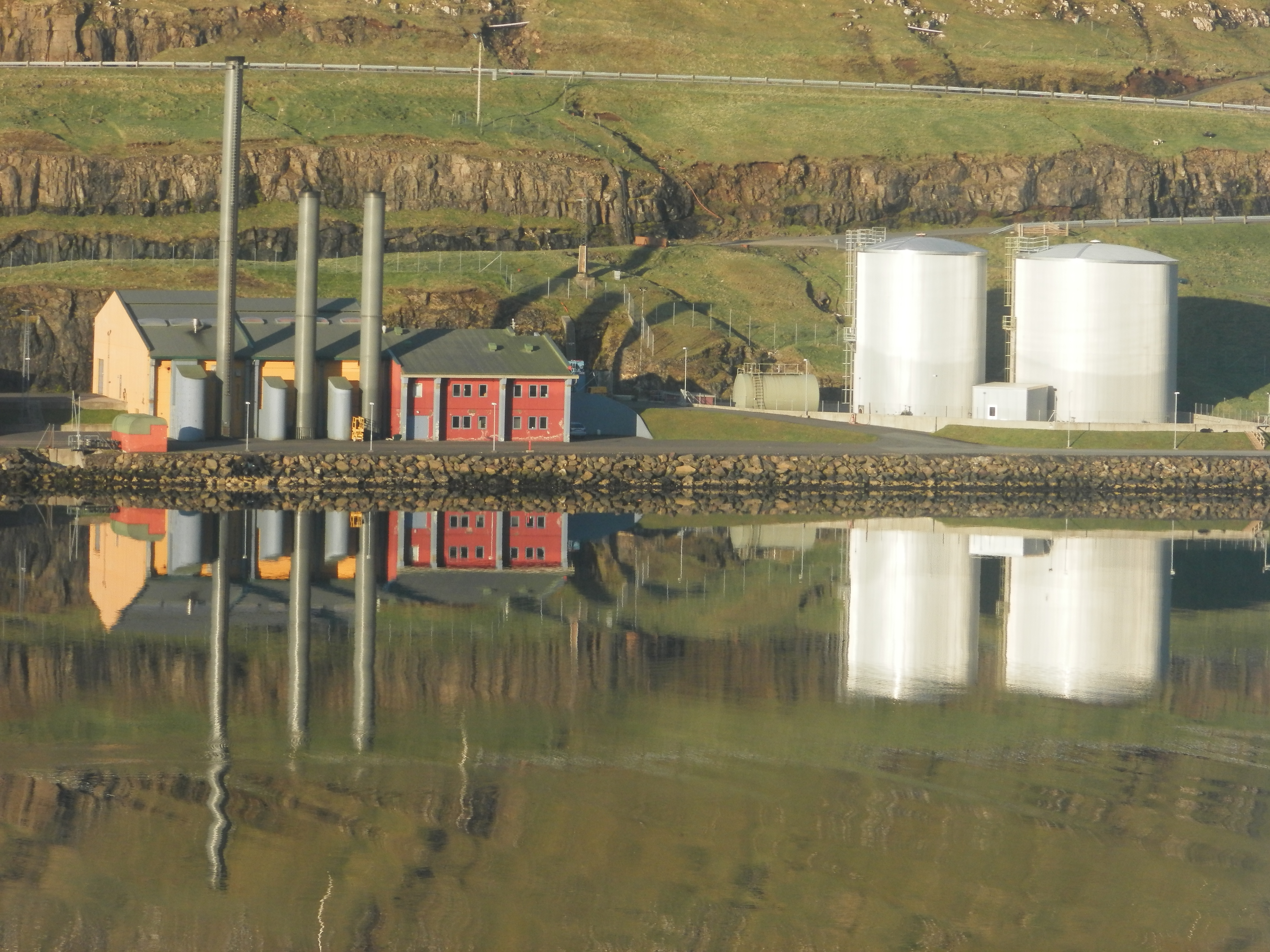
Vágsverkið of SEV produces electricity. It is located on the south side of Vágsfjørður.

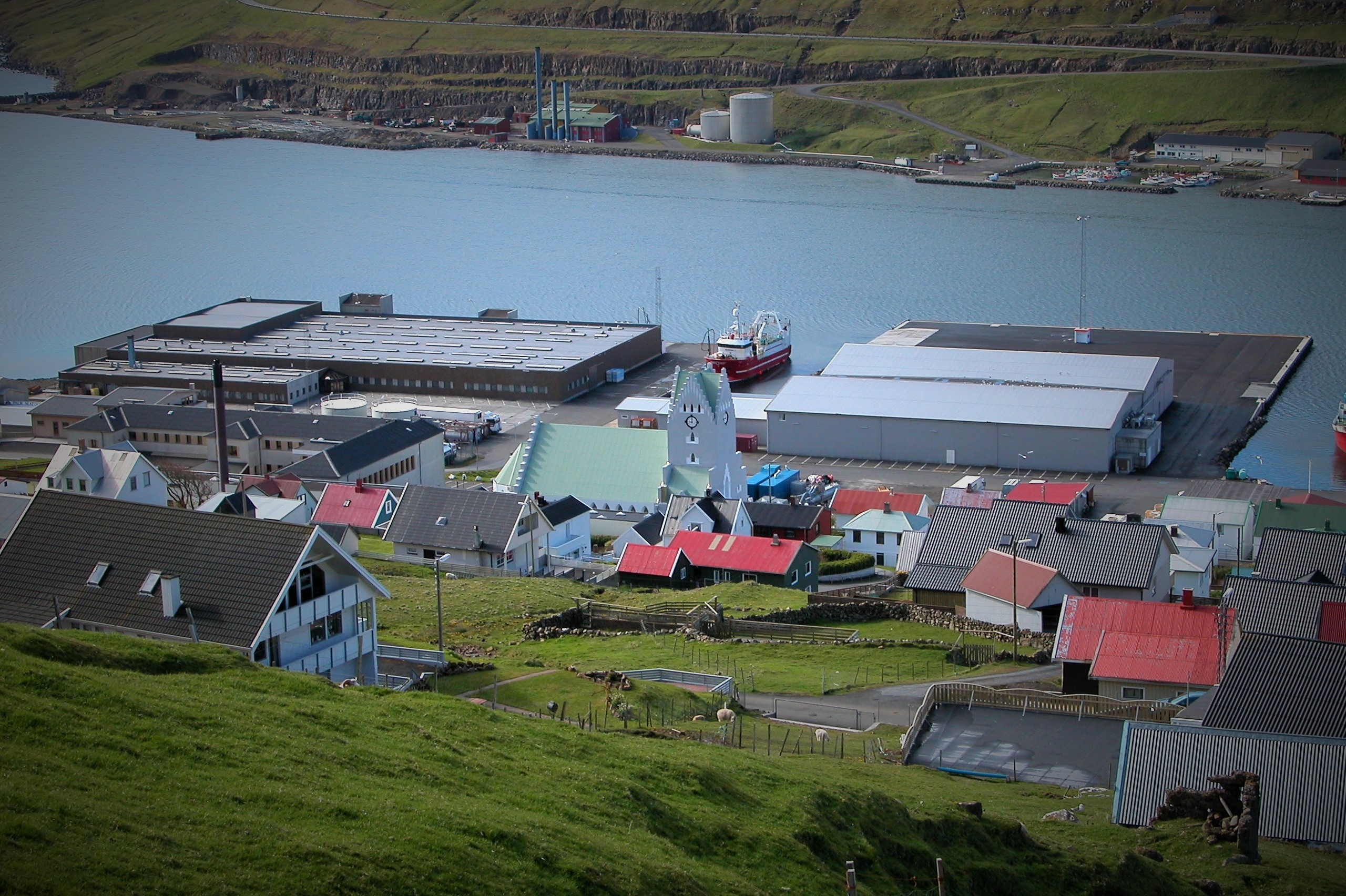
The harbour and Vágsfjørður

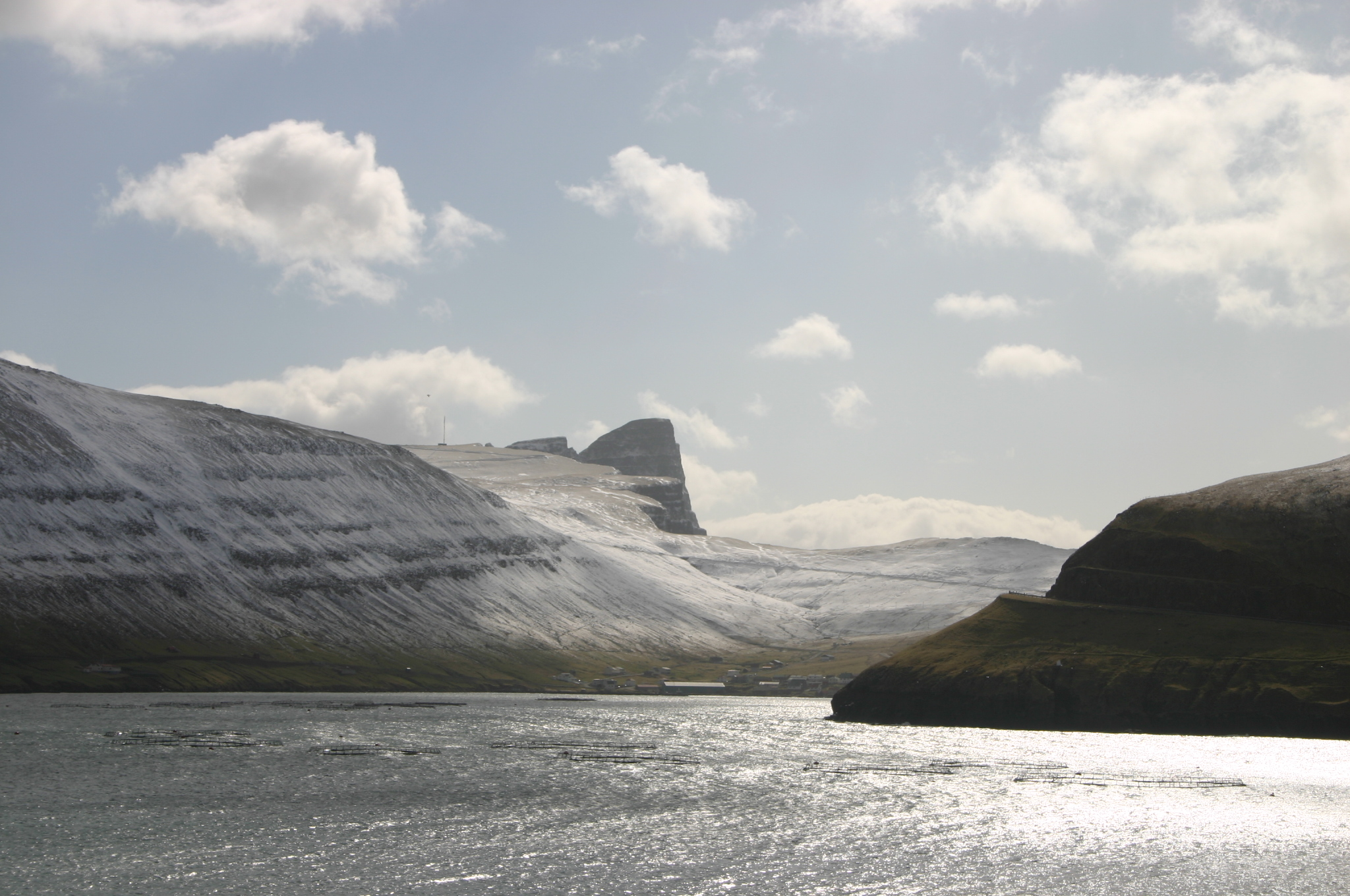
Vágsfjørður, Lopransfjørður and Lopra with the 470 meter high cliff Beinisvørð
