= Vágseiði =

Location in Vágur, Faroe Islands

Coordinates: 61.466°N 6.840°W

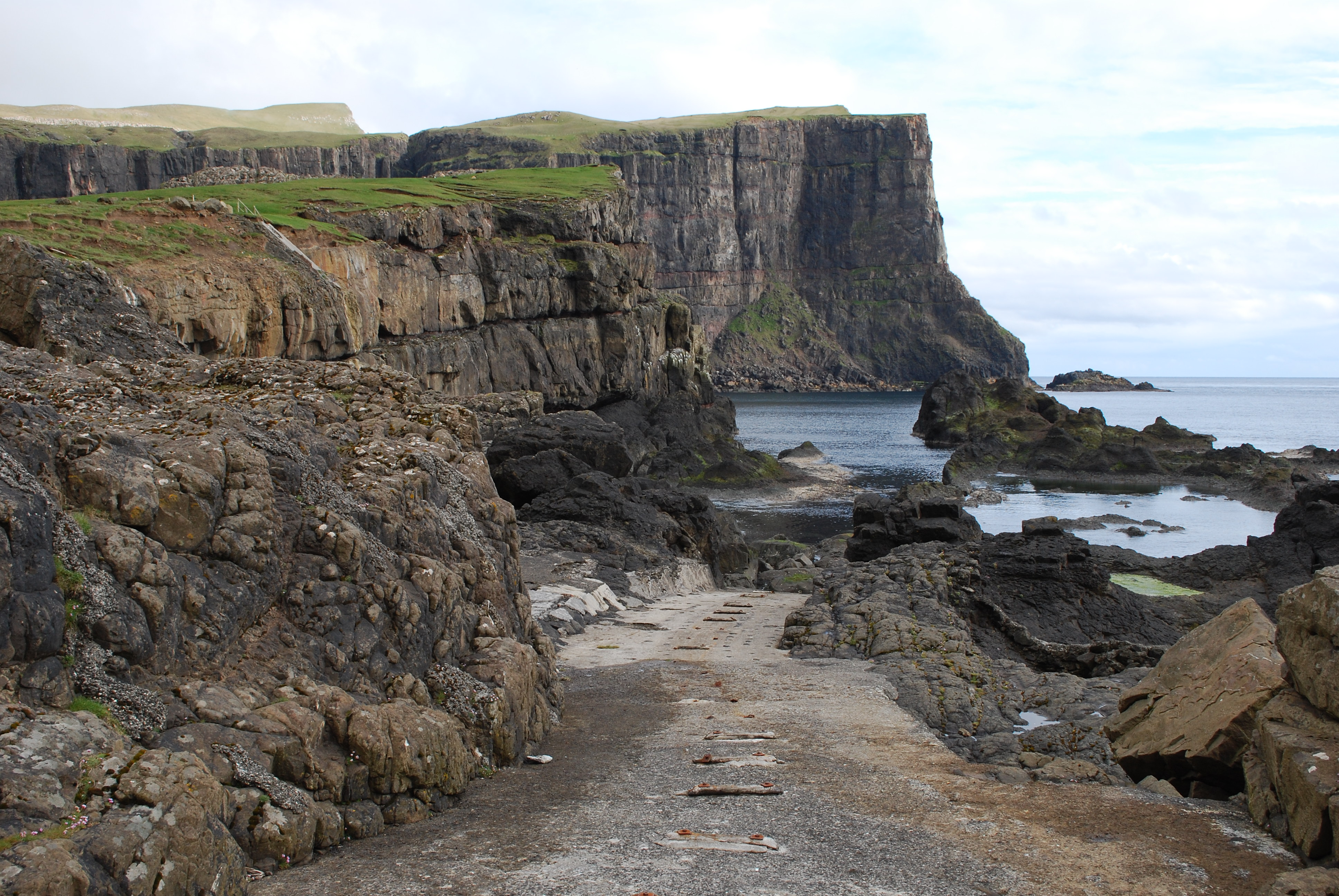
Vágseiði, Kleivin where the old boat harbour was, showing the concrete access road. The high cliff (200 metres) is called Skúvanes, Eggjarnar is on top of the cliff.

Vágseiði is an area in Vágur, Faroe Islands, located on the west coast of Suðuroy west of the village Vágur, from which it takes its name. Eiði is the Faroese word for isthmus. The distance between the east and the west coast of Vágur is only one km. There is a lake between the village and Vágseiði, the lake is called Vatnið, which is the Faroese word for Lake. The football stadium of FC Suðuroy and the sports hall Vágshøll are located on Vágseiði, 100-200 m from the cliffs. The natural harbour on Vágseiði is called Kleivin. The 200m high cliff south of Vágseiði is called Skúvanes, and the cliffs from Skúvanes towards south are called Eggjarnar. There is a skerry, which looks like some rocks, in the bay of Vágseiði, this skerry is called Heltnarnar. The sea is often rough here and the waves often break against the cliffs here, and often Heltnarnar almost disappear in the surf.

== History ==
There is a small boat harbour on Vágseiði, no pier or anything like that, just a natural harbour. It is not in daily use anymore, but in the 19th and early 20th century it was a busy harbour for fishing boats. Kleivin is partially natural harbour and partially man made. Part of the cliffs have been taken away by dynamite in 1929, concrete was used to improve the harbour and wooden stocks for the boats were sat on the concrete, in order to make it easier to take the boats down to the sea.

In 1906 fishermen from Vágur made a cable way from the gorge Múlagjógv in the west towards east to Vágseiði. The sea is more calm in the gorge, and it was better to take the boats from Múlagjógv up in the air, pulled by man power using the cable way, better than using the dangerous sea around Heltnarnar to Kleivin. The cable way was one of the reasons that the first electricity power plant in the Faroe Islands was made a few kilometers north of Vágseiði, on the other side of the mountain Gjógvárafjall in a place called Botn or Í Botni (In the Bottom). They wanted electricity for the cable way in order to drag the boats ashore. The cable way was partially financed by the fishermen who used it and partially by Vágur Municipality.

The sea is often very rough on Vágseiði, so it could be dangerous to go fishing from this place, but they fishermen had great respect for the weather conditions. They used the other harbour on the east coast when the weather didn't allow them to go fishing from Vágseiði. There used to be boat houses on Vágseiði, but a hurricane on 14 January 1989 which caused much damage and caused the sea to go over its level, took away most of these boat houses and they have not been re-built since then. The boats are now in other boat houses around the fjord of Vágur, Vágsfjørður. Sometimes they make excursions in old wooden boats starting from Vágseiði. The boats then get transported by trucks to Vágseiði. In May 2010 people from Vágur and from some of the neighbour villages made an excursion with the old wooden rowing boats which are called Grindabátar, to Sumba in the south and back again.

== Gallery ==
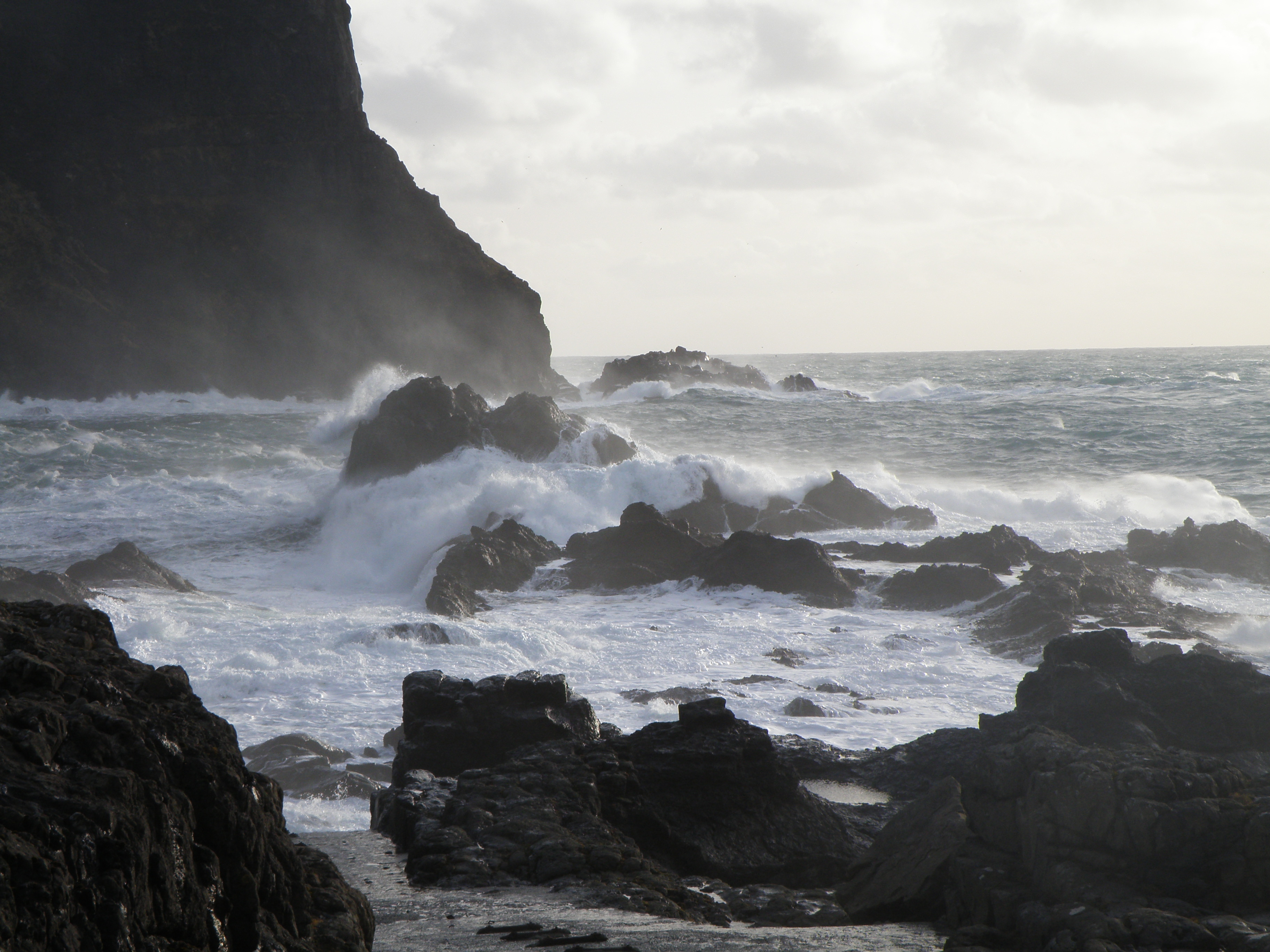
Rough sea on Heltnarnar, seen from Kleivin on Vágseiði.

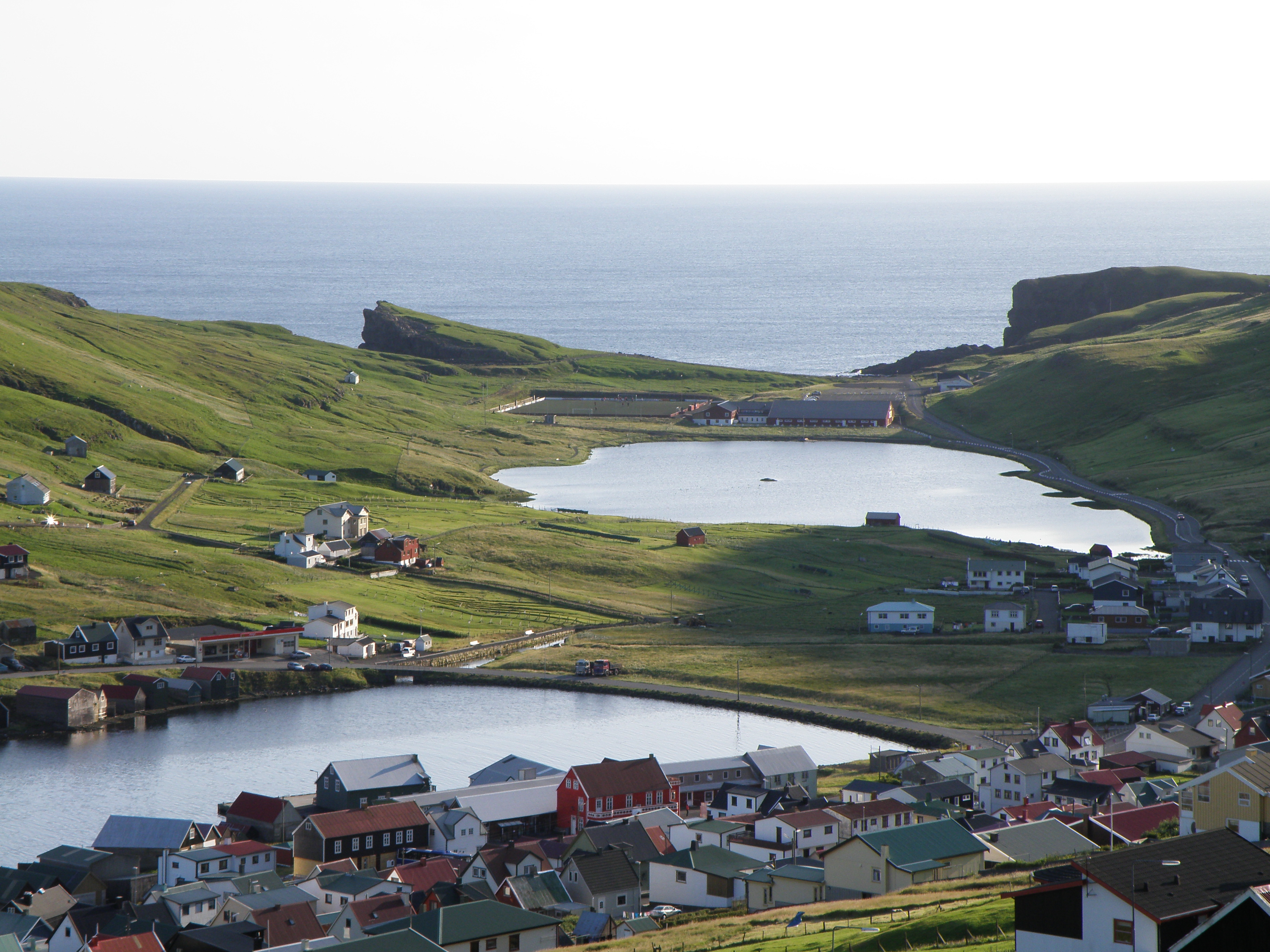
Vágur and Vágsfjørður, the lake Vatnið and Vágseiði

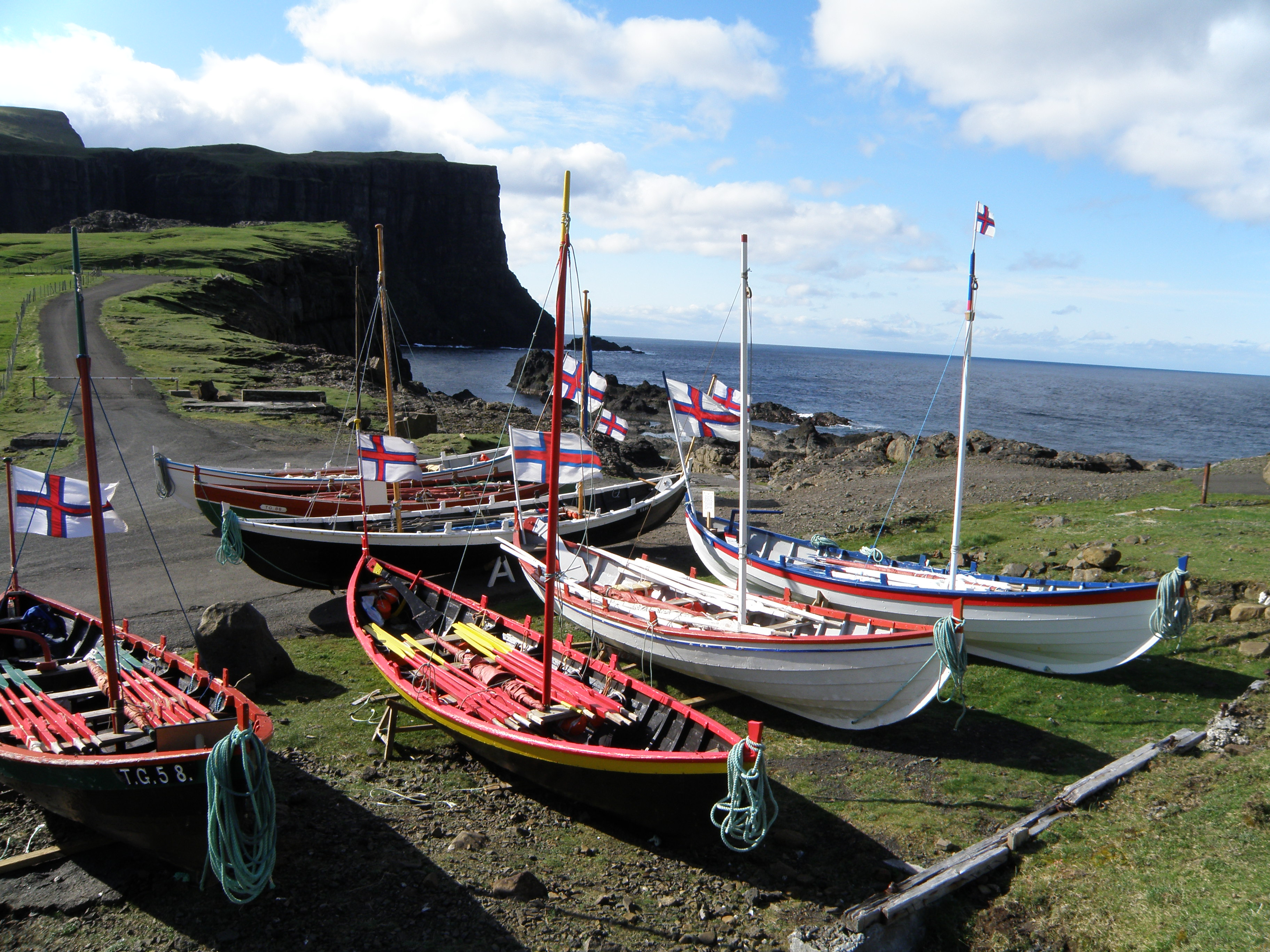
Faroese wooden rowing boats (Grindabátar) on Vágseiði in May 2010

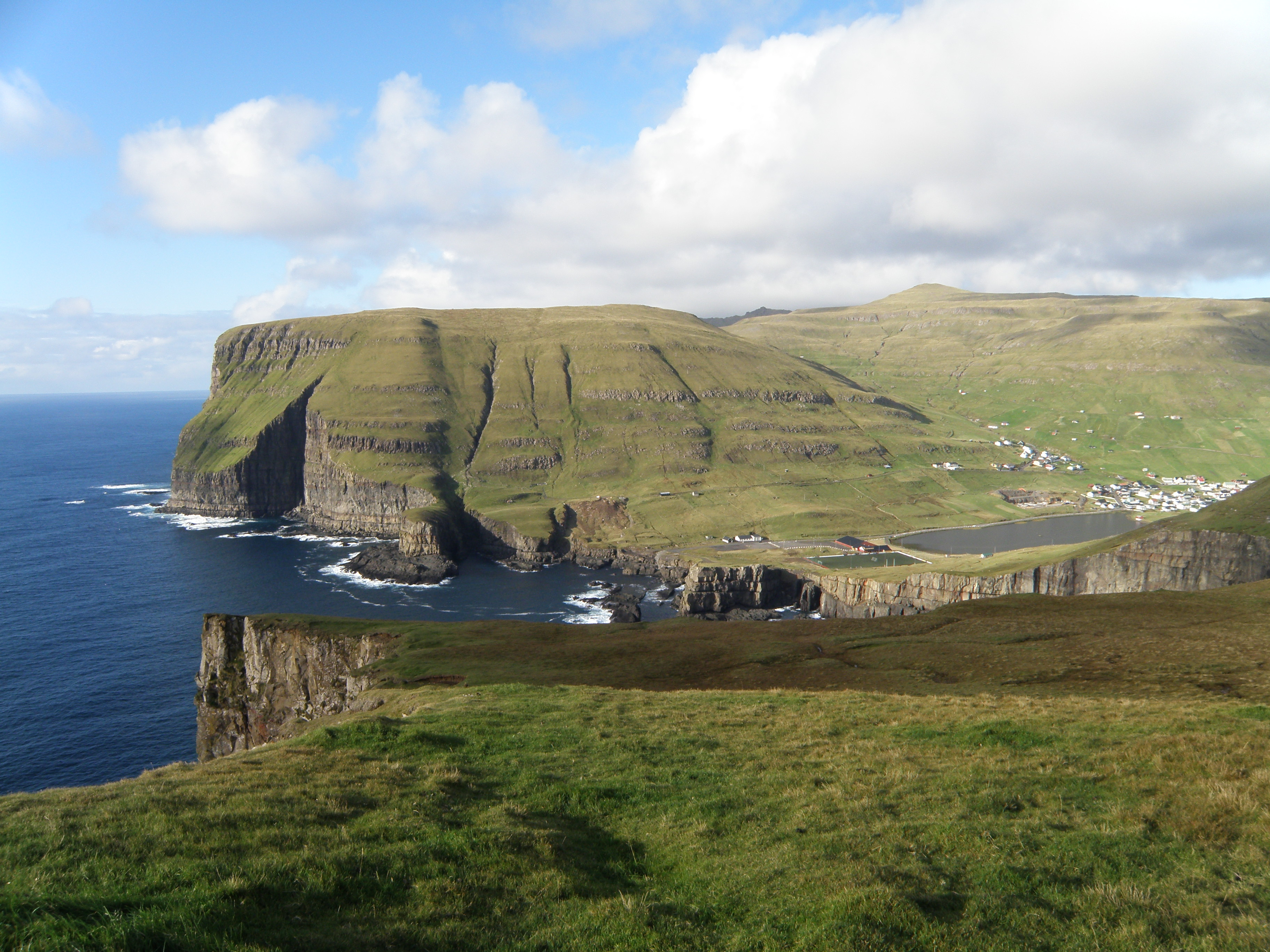
View from Eggjarnar to Vágseiði.
