= Eggjarnar =

Place to the south of the village of Vágur on Suðuroy island in the Faroe Islands

Coordinates: 61.457°N 6.830°W

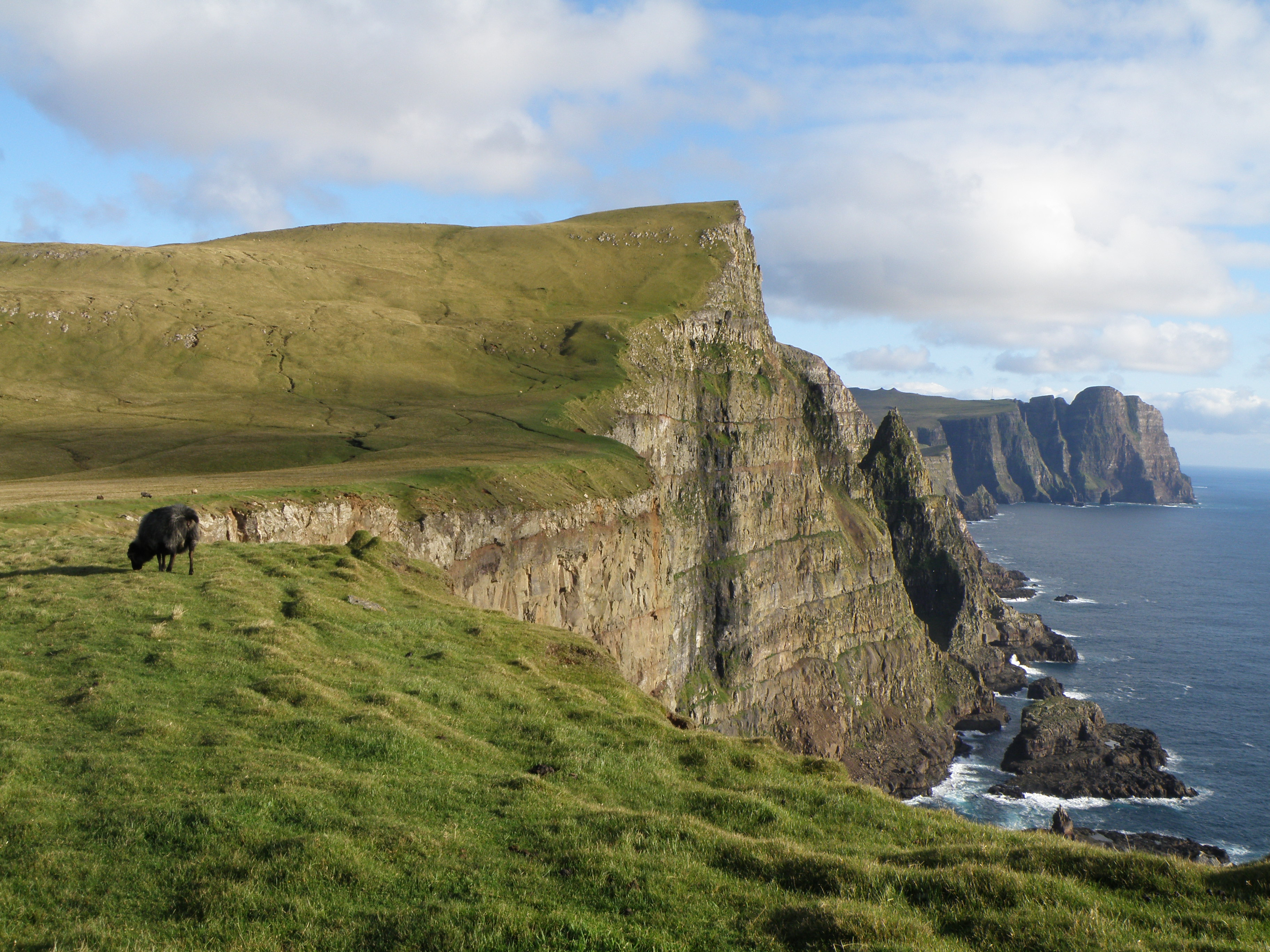
Eggjarnar, view south towards the cliffs of Beinisvørð

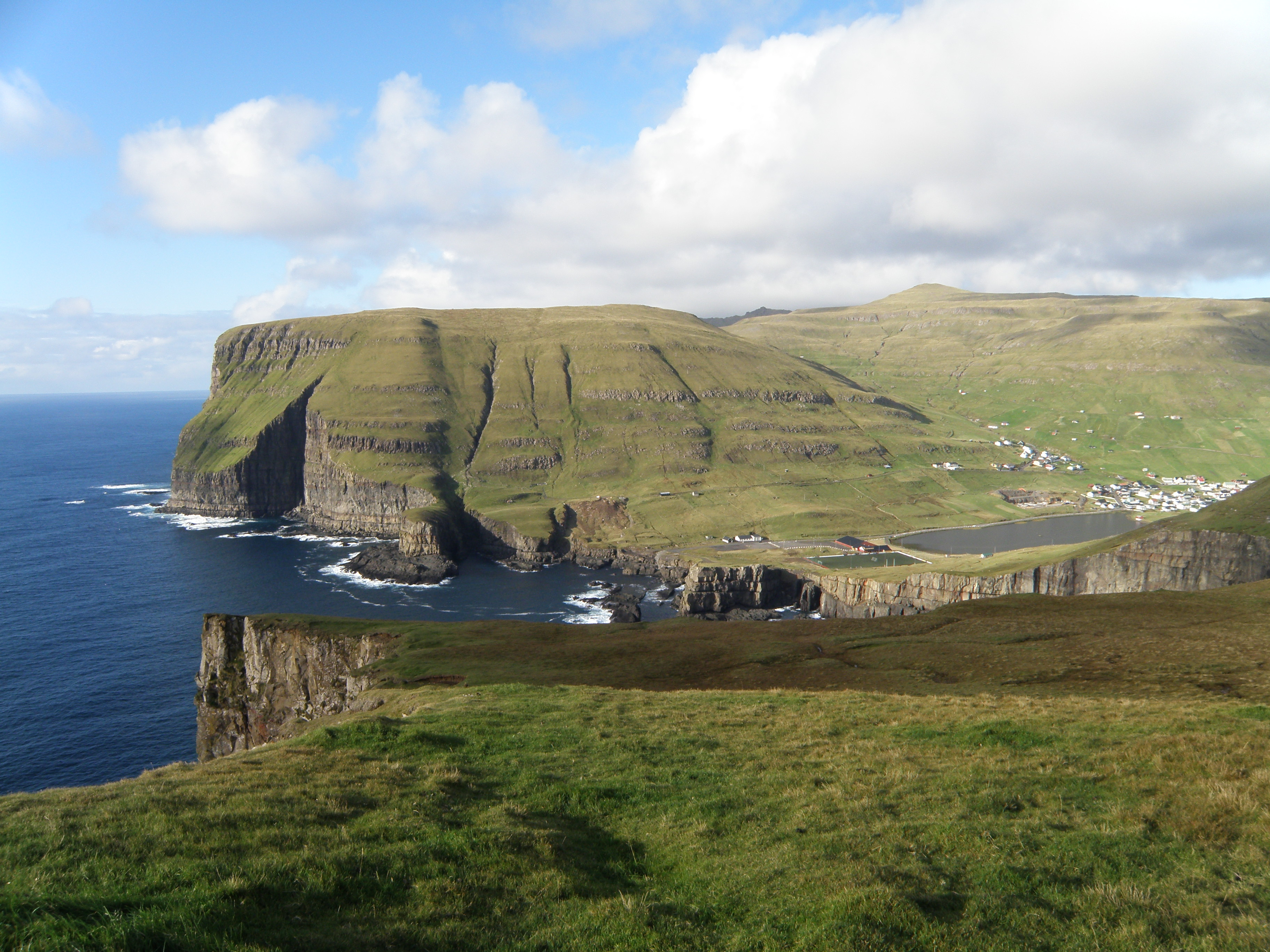
View north from Eggjarnar towards Vágseiði and the mountain of Gjógvaráfjall

Eggjarnar (also called Skúvanes) is a place to the south of the village of Vágur on Suðuroy island in the Faroe Islands, which is known for its scenic viewpoint to the sea-cliffs of the southern part of Suðuroy all the way to Beinisvørð in the south, and to Vágseiði in the north.

== Geography ==
The location is approached by a zig-zagging road climbing a hill, between 10 and 15 minutes' drive by road from Vágur. From the viewpoint the Beinisvørð cliffs can be seen, as well as Lopranseiði to the south and Vágseiði to the north. The Eggjarnar cliffs rise up to about 200 metres (660 ft) in height.

== The Loran-A Station ==
During World War II the Americans built a LORAN A station south of Vágur on Eggjarnar and raised four high masts, LORAN referring to long-range navigation. The first signal went on air on 15 October 1943. The British military which had occupied the Faroe Islands shortly after Germany occupied Denmark, used the Loran-A station to guide British aircraft and ships across the Atlantic. The Loran-A station continued to work after the war ended, it was taken over by the Danes in 1946; and it was in function until December 1977. The ruins of the Loran-A station and of some of the other buildings from the World War II period can still be seen on Eggjarnar.

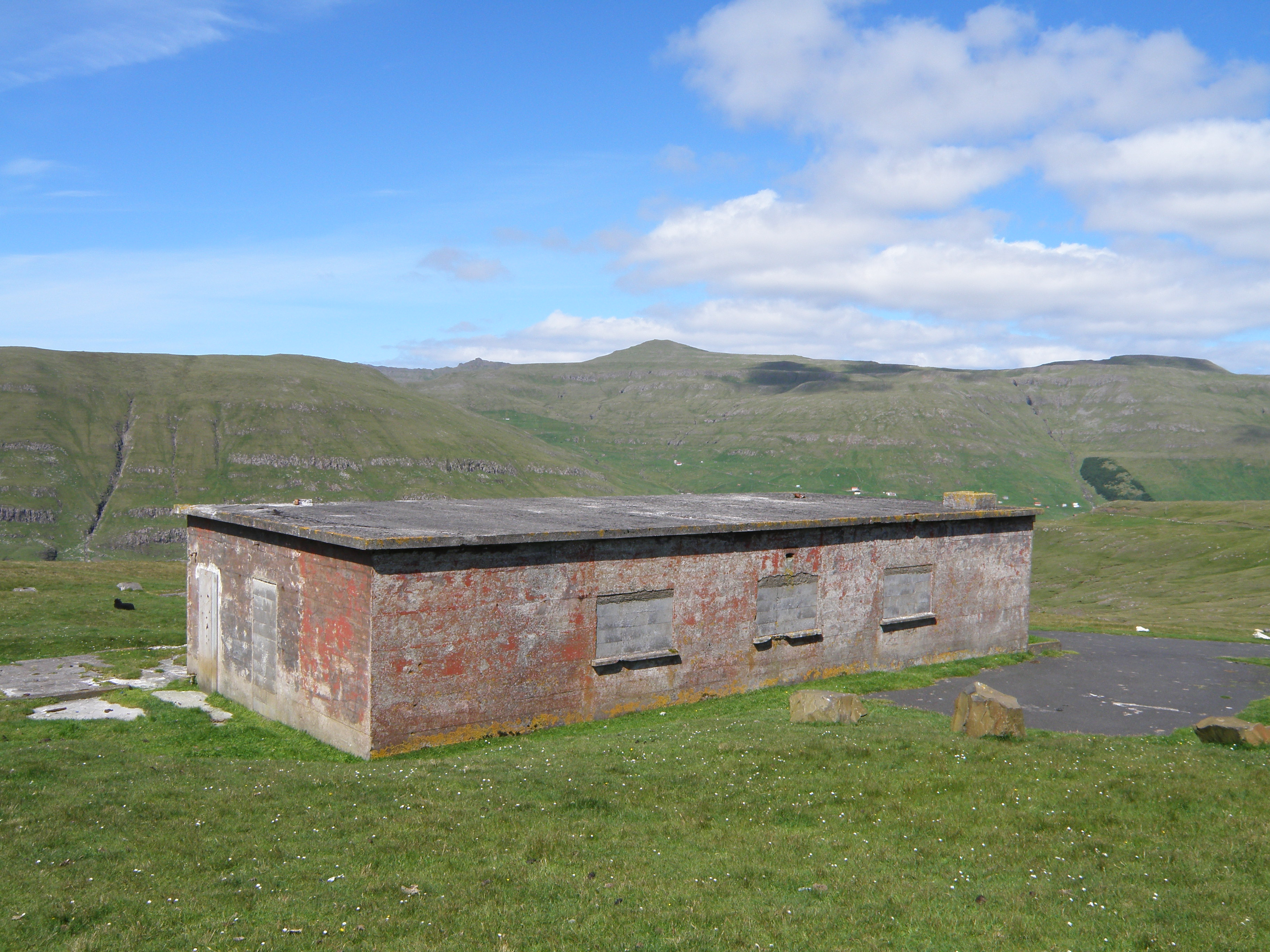
British pillbox from World War II.

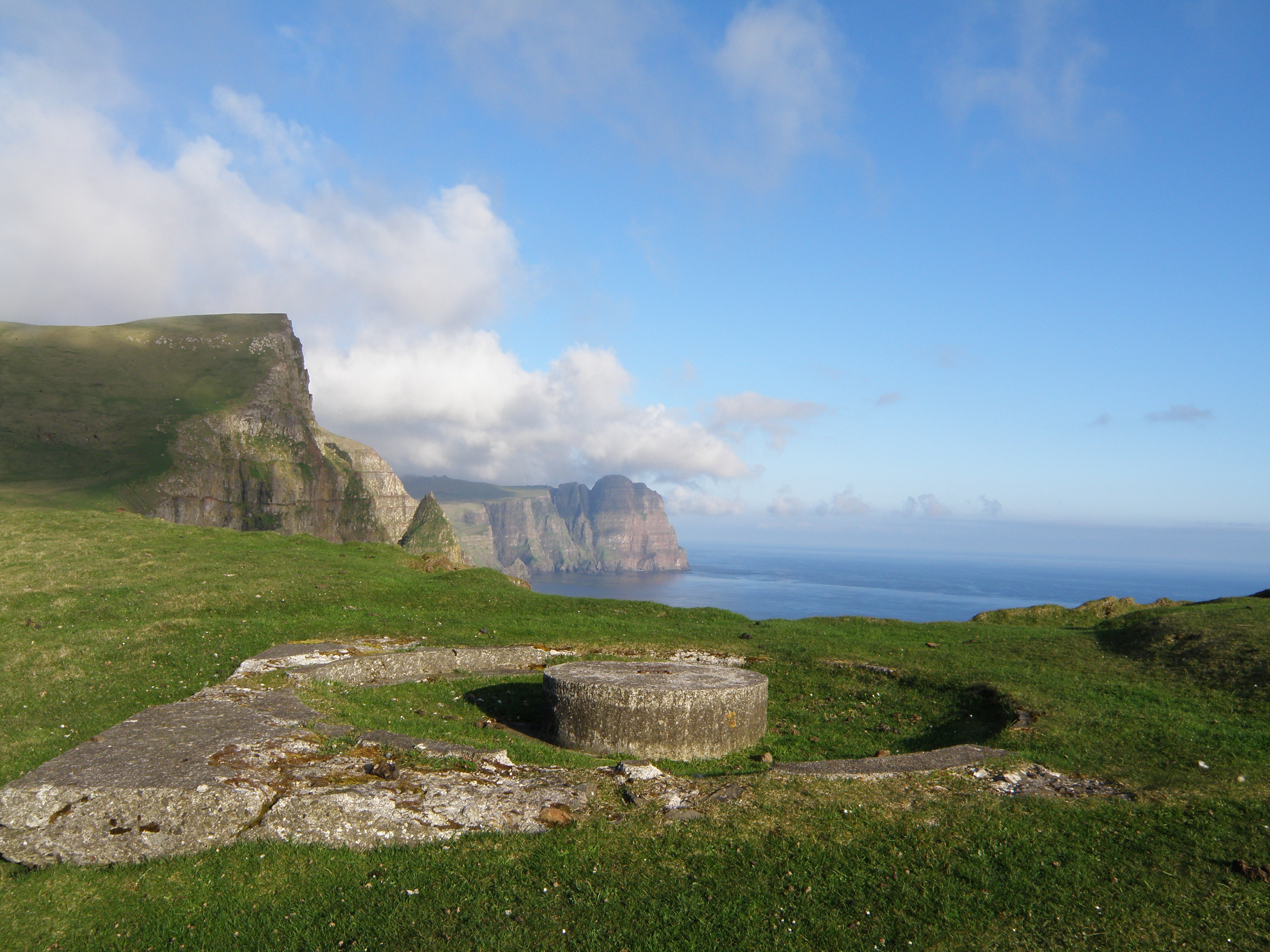
World War II Remains of a British Concrete Gun Pit on Eggjarnar.
