= Sumbiarhólmur =

Islet in the Faroe Islands

Coordinates: 61°23′N 6°43′W

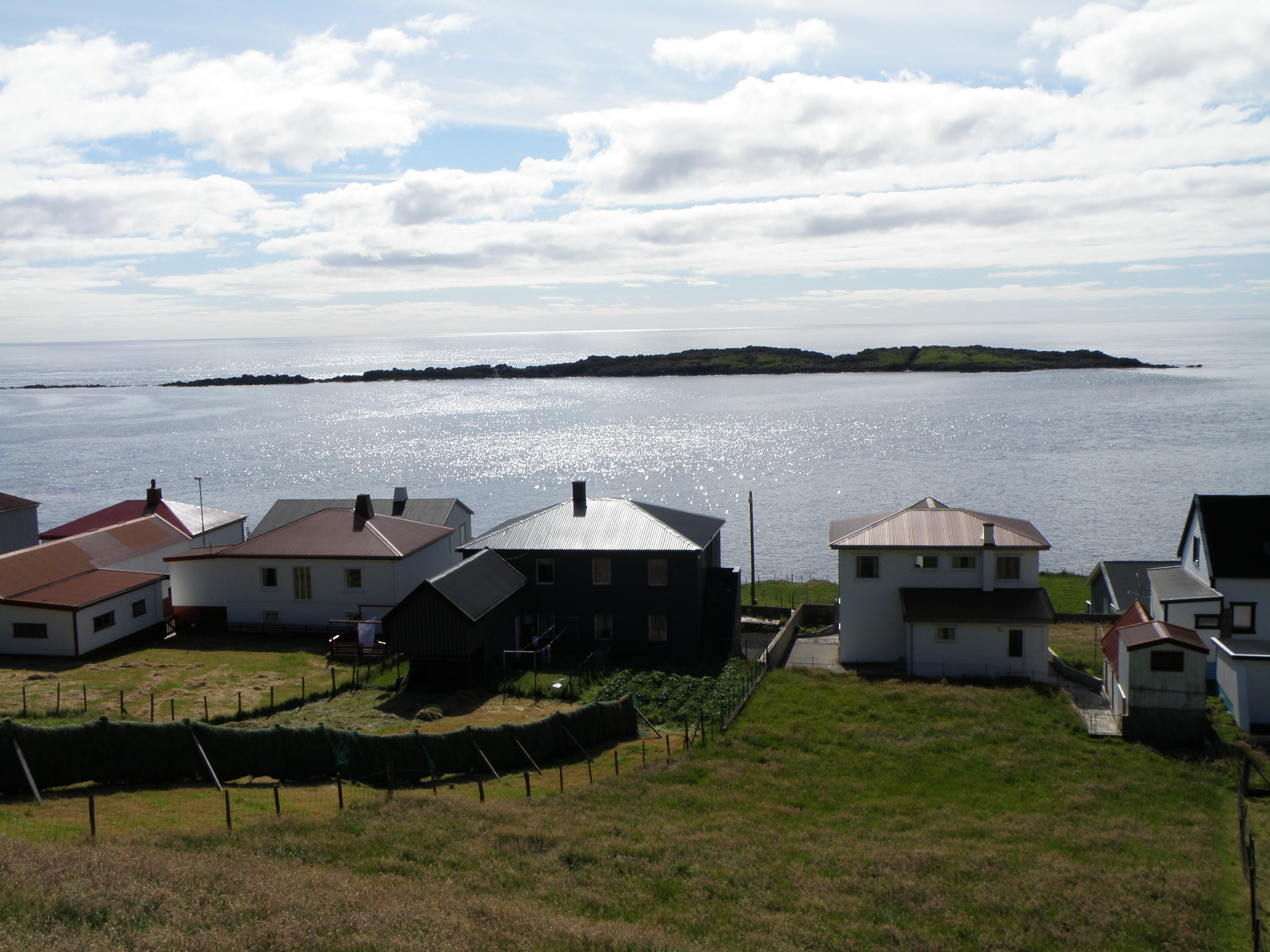
Sumbiarhólmur, seen from Sumba.

Sumbiarhólmur is an islet in the Faroe Islands, located just outside the village of Sumba, which is the southernmost village on the island of Suðuroy. At 7 hectares in area, Sumbiarhólmur is the 6th largest islet of the Faroe Islands. The North Atlantic Ocean is often quite rough near Sumbiarhólmur and around Flesjarnar further south. Boat accidents have happened in the area.

People from Sumba graze rams on the islet in summertime.
