= Ruth Smith (artist) =

Faroese artist

Ruth Smith Nielsen
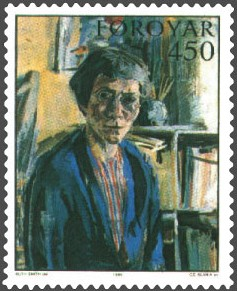
- Self portrait from 1952
- Born: Ruth Smith; 5 April 1913; Vágur, Faroe Islands
- Died: 26 May 1958 (aged 45); Vágur, Faroe Islands
- Education: Art Academy of Copenhagen
- Known for: Painting
- Spouse: Poul Morell Nielsen (m. 1945)

Ruth Smith Nielsen (5 April 1913 in Vágur – 26 May 1958) was a Faroese artist.

== Biography ==
Smith lived for some years in Denmark, where she was educated as a painter: first, at the Bizzie Højer Art School, and, later, at the Art Academy of Copenhagen.

Smith married the architect Poul Morell Nielsen in 1945. They lived in Lemvig, Denmark. Later, with her husband, she moved back to the Faroe Islands; and in the last years of her life she lived in the small village of Nes, which is located on the fjord Vágsfjørður between the villages Vágur, where she was born, and Porkeri. Smith enjoyed swimming in the sea; in 1958, she drowned while swimming in Vágsfjørður.

== Work ==
Ruth Smith dealt with colours more sensitively than many of her contemporaries. She caught the Faroese light in her pictures, and the colours vibrate under brush lines. Inspired by Cézanne, her landscapes have Impressionist influences. Nevertheless, her work is considered representative of realism.

Her two self-portraits of 1955 are ranked the most important paintings of the Faroes and are in the Faroe Islands Art Museum.

== Ruth Smith Art Museum ==
There is an art museum in Vágur in honour of Ruth Smith. The museum is called Ruth Smith Savnið, which means Ruth Smith Art Museum. The museum is located in the Old School on Vágsvegur 101, which is the same school where Ruth Smith went to school as a child. The museum has paintings and drawing by the artist. One of the main attractions is a self-portrait, which she painted in 1941. It is the same self-portrait which was used as the cover of a book about the artist Ruth Smith.

== Literature ==
- Dagmar Warming: Ruth Smith : Lív og verk. Tórshavn: Listasavn Føroya, 2007 - ISBN 978-99918-987-0-4 (294 p. Faroese)
