= Lopra =

- Village
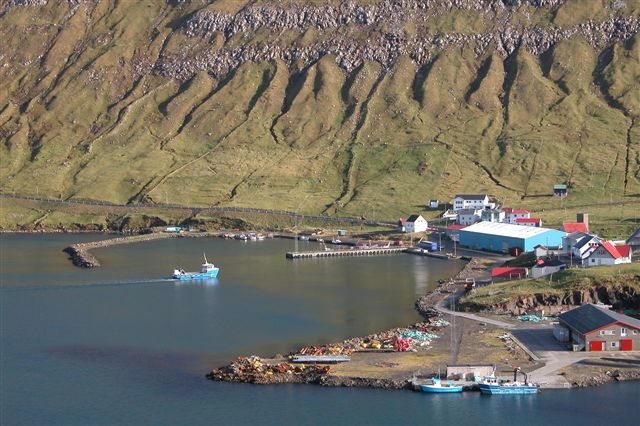
- Lopra

- Location in the Faroe Islands
- Coordinates: 61°26′40″N 6°46′8″W
- State: Kingdom of Denmark
- Constituent country: Faroe Islands
- Island: Suðuroy
- Municipality: Sumbiar kommuna

Population (September 2025)
  - Total: 80
- Time zone: GMT
  - Summer (DST): UTC+1 (EST)
- Postal code: FO 926
- Climate: Cfc

Lopra (Danish: Lobra) is a village on the island of Suðuroy in the Faroe Islands, with the postal code FO 926.

It is located in the Municipality of Sumba along with the villages of Akrar, Sumba and Víkarbyrgi (now deserted), constituting the southernmost settlements in the Faroe Islands. The name Lopra may have its origin in the gaelic word "lobar" which translates into English as leprosy, and Lopra may be a pre-Norse settlement of Gaelic hermits from c. 6th to c. 8th century AD.

During the 1980s and 1990s there were attempts at drilling for oil and gas in Lopra, without success.

== Lopranseiði and Lopransholmur ==
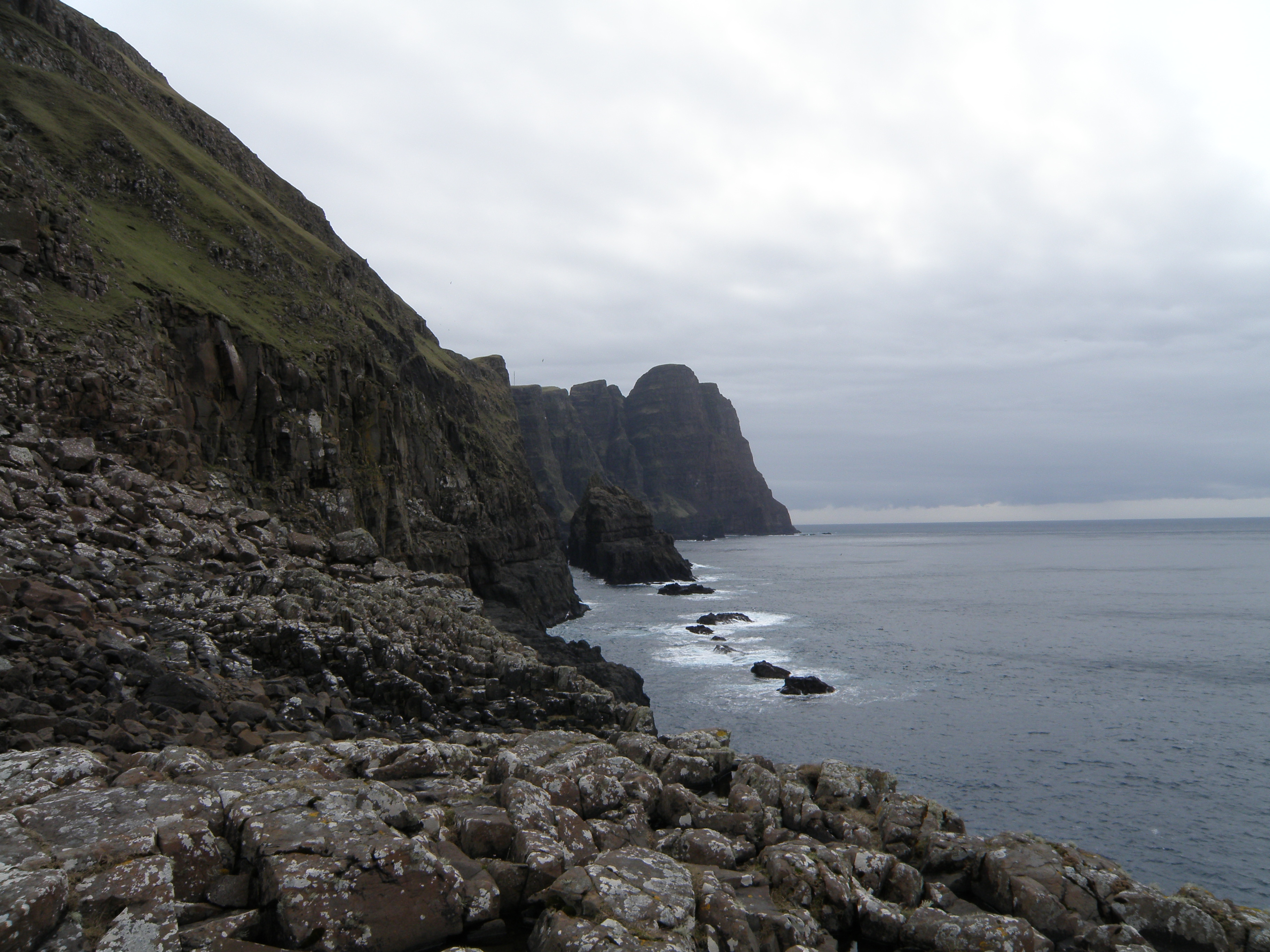
Lopranseiði

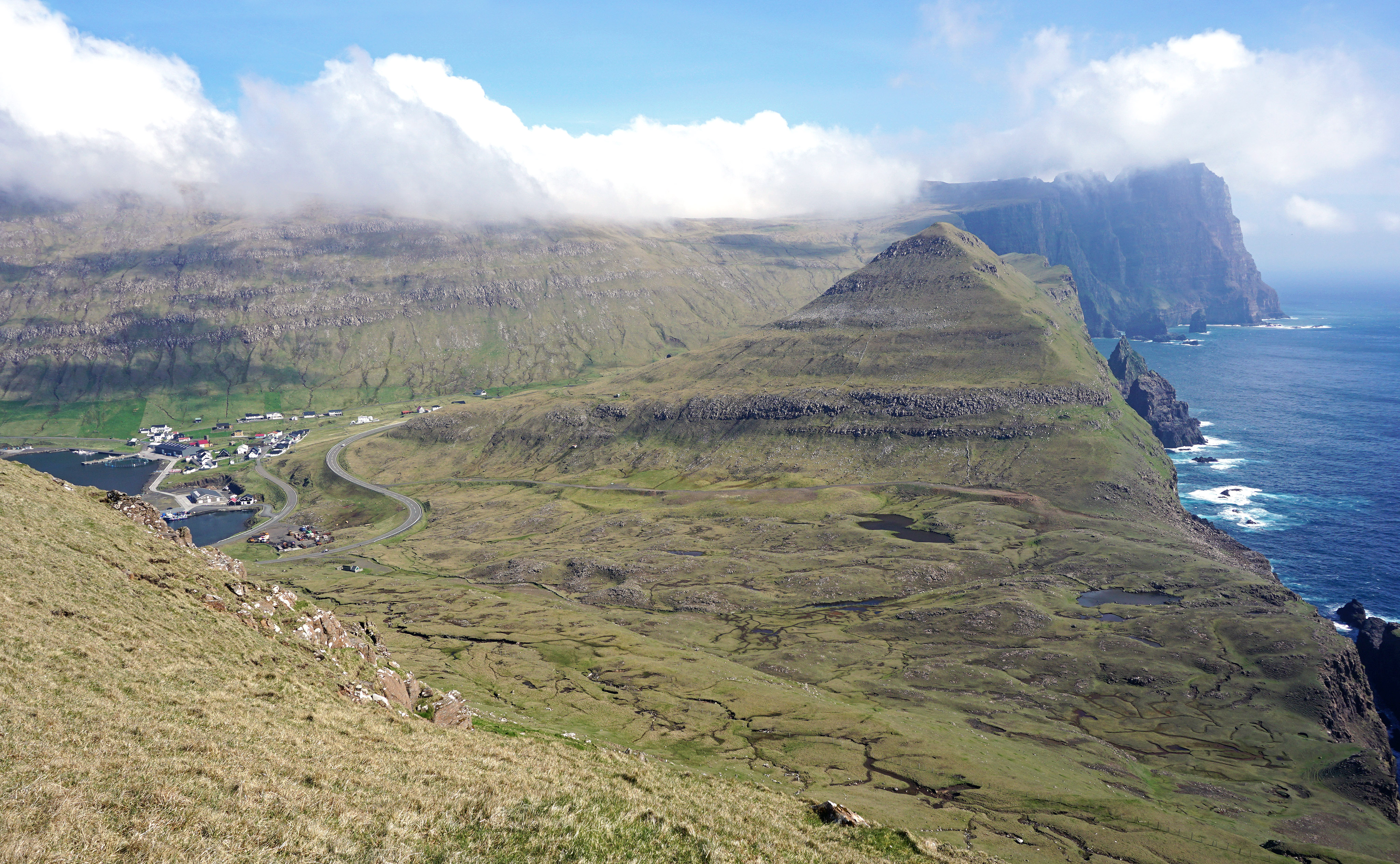
View towards Kirvi, near the village Lopra, Faroe Islands. The top of the mountain is called Kirviskollur. The cliff to the right on the photo is called Beinisvørð. It is 470 meters high and is the second highest sea cliff of the Faroe Islands. Beinisvørð is also one of the highest sea cliffs in Europe.

Sights near Lopra include Lopranseiði and Lopransholmur. From Lopranseiði, the visiter can see Beinisvørð towards south and almost half of the west coast of Suðuroy.

== Westerbeek went shipwreck south of Lopranseiði ==
A Dutch ship named SS Westerbeek was shipwrecked near Lopranseiði on 2 September 1742. 80 men survived the accident, one died in the attempt to climb the steep cliff of Lopranseiði, 10 men lost their lives while still on board, they were ill and stayed in bed when the accident took place. Three of the survivors were allowed to leave the Faroe Islands a short time after the accident, with Danish ships which were in Tórshavn at that time. But the captains of these two ships refused to take all 80 men with them to Denmark. So 77 of the survivors had to live in the Faroe Islands for 9 months, before they could go back to the Netherlands and to the other countries where they came from.

== The Whaling Station in Lopra ==
In 1901 the company Suderø, founded by the Norwegian Peder Olsen Bogen, built a whaling station in Lopra, this station, like so many others had been located in Finnmarken, Norway before being dismantled and transported across the sea. After ten years, Suderø would become probably the largest whaling company in the country.

Bogen was one of the great influences on commercial whaling in Norway, Faroe Islands and the great seas, before he died in 1914 (born 1861) he had founded seven whaling companies, and was director of five land based whaling stations, four factory ships, three cargo ships and 18 whaling boats. And was a knight of the 1st order, of St. Olav.

Suderø, previously named Thekla in Norway, had one whaling boat Thekla which was included in the transfer to the Faroes, in 1902 the company built a new boat named Suderø, and almost every year until 1916 the station was the most productive of the stations in the country, best results were in 1909 and 1915, with 3100 and 4230 barrels of whale oil. The result for the individual boat however, never reached the levels that the stations at Gjánoyri and Norðdepil got in 1900.

The station at Lopra became the most productive, due to its location, with easy access both east, south and west where migrating whales passed.

In 1904, Lopra processed 135 whales with two boats, which gave 2800 barrels of whale oil.

In 1908 the station had three boats, but the results that year were bad for all stations. With an average of 50 whales for each boat however, Lopra managed better than the others this year.

The year 1909 was the best year overall for all stations with 13.850 barrels produced in total. This year one of the boats in Lopra shot a blue whale, which is probably the largest shot in the Faroes, it gave 120 barrels of oil.

In 1906 Suderø founded together with Norrøna in Shetland and a new Norwegian company, the company Sandefjords Hvalfangerselskap and were thus the second company to commence whaling in antarctic waters. Boats from Suderø were the first to shoot whales year round, sailing back and for between the two hemispheres between seasons.

In the years 1913 and 1915 Lopra was the only station active together with Emma in Funningsfirði. 1915 was a really good year for Lopra, as no other nations whaled due to World War I there were plenty of blue and fin whales which came unmolested to the Faroes. This year Lopra processed 179 whales, which gave 4400 barrels of whale oil, and about 5000 200-lb bags of bone meal.

1916 was a worse season, and only 198 whales were shot by all companies, however the war affected prices for oil and meal so that financially it was one of the better seasons.

No whales were shot in the years 1917–1920 in the Faroes. With the season 1920 a huge disappointment, no activity was at Lopra until the seasons 1923/24, 1925 and 26 were huge disappointments and the station closed down in 1928 at large financial cost to shareholders.

In 1933 N. J. Mortensen bought the station, and ran it until 1948, along the way making various improvements to the station. During World War II, all whaling ceased.

From 1948 to 1953 various owners tried their hands at whaling, but without great success, and the last season only 78 whales were shot which resulted in 2000 barrels of whale oil. Since then there been no whaling activity at Lopra.

== See also ==
- List of towns in the Faroe Islands
