= Víkarbyrgi =

- Abandoned village
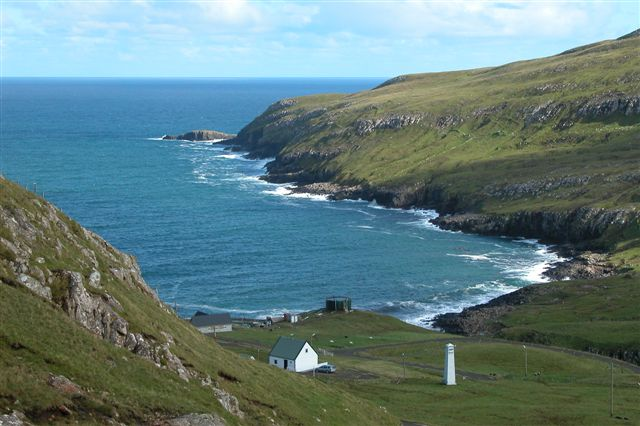
- View of Víkarbyrgi

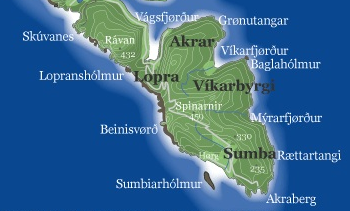
- Map of south Suðuroy showing location of Víkarbyrgi

- Location in the Faroe Islands
- Coordinates: 61°26′34″N 6°43′28″W
- State: Kingdom of Denmark
- Constituent country: Faroe Islands
- Island: Suðuroy
- Municipality: Sumbíar kommuna
- Elevation: 210 ft (64 m)

Population
  - Total: none
- Time zone: GMT
  - Summer (DST): UTC+1 (EST)
- Postal code: 928

Víkarbyrgi is a former village on the Faroese island of Suðuroy, Faroe Islands.

It no longer has a population. It retains a postal code (FO 928) and is located at N 61° 26' 34 W 6° 43' 28. The etymology of its name is reputed to be connected with an early settlement of Irish monks who predated the arrival of the Vikings. The last inhabitants had left Víkarbyrgi by 2003.

== See also ==
- List of towns in the Faroe Islands
