= Beinisvørð =

Sea cliff in Suðuroy, Faroe Islands

Coordinates: 61°25′35″N 6°46′02″W

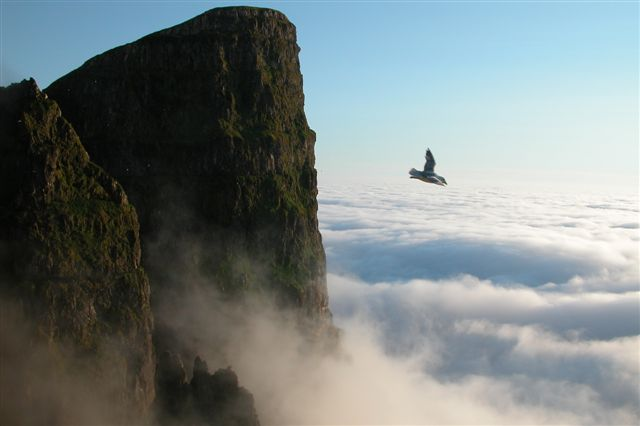
Beinisvørð, seen from Hesturin

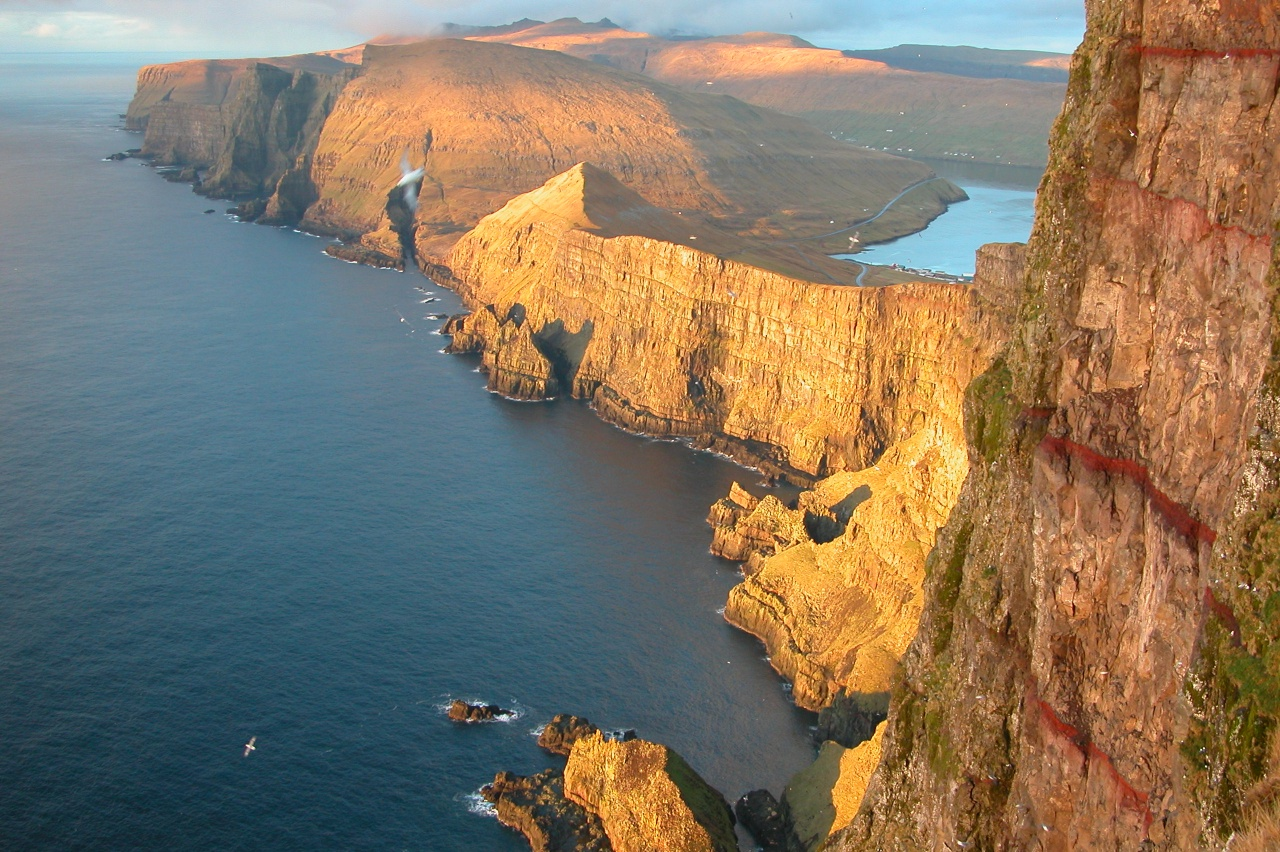
View from Beinisvørð to the west coast of Suðuroy

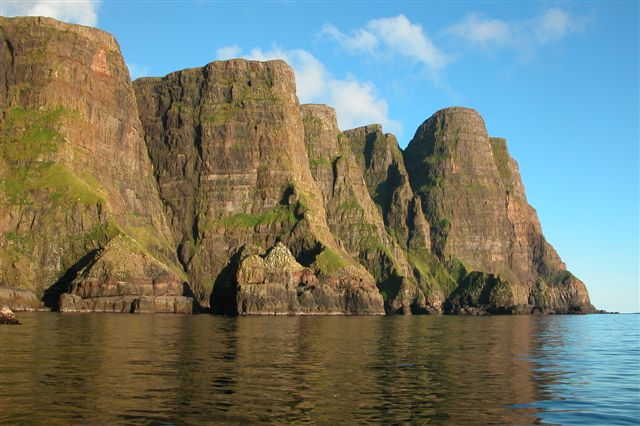
Beinisvørð and the west coast of Suðuroy

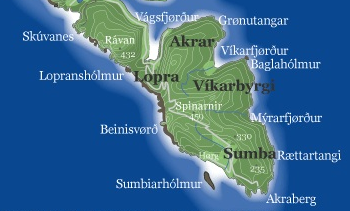
Map of the southernmost part of Suðuroy, showing the location of Beinisvørð

Beinisvørð (Beinisvord) is a 469 metres (1,539 ft) high sea cliff in Suðuroy, Faroe Islands, the highest sea cliff in Suðuroy. It is located between the villages of Lopra and Sumba. Beinisvørð has vertical cliffs facing the sea and a green slope down towards the village of Sumba. The triangular top of Beinisvørð is visible from many places in Suðuroy, including Lopra, Nes and Marknoyri, the easternmost part of Vágur. In clear weather it is also visible from Smyril M/F just before she enters the fjord of Trongisvágur, Trongisvágsfjørður. Men from Sumba used to rappel down the steep mountain side of Beinisvørð on bird lines (it is called "síging"; one man hangs on a thick rope, while several men hold it at the top) in order to catch sea birds and to collect eggs. Both birds and their eggs were important food for the people of Sumba in the past. Several men have been killed while doing this; sometimes a stone fell on a man's head, fatally injuring him. In 1975 a big avalanche at Beinisvørð destroyed numerous bird habitats and landmarks.

== Beinisvørð in Faroese poetry ==
At least two famous Faroese poets have mentioned Beinisvørð in poems. Poul F. Joensen (born 1898 in Sumba, died 1970 in Froðba) often mentioned Beinisvørð as the guardian spirit of the country. A Faroese singer and composer from Klaksvík, Hanus G. Johansen, set several of these poems to music and after that they became very popular and well known amongst Faroese of all ages. Janus Djurhuus (born 1881 in Tórshavn, died 1948) uses it as a symbol of Faroese independence in "Heimferð Nólsoyar Páls".

== Tourism ==
Tourists who visit Suðuroy often wish to see Beinisvørð. It can be seen from several locations, the nearest being Hesturin, near the one-lane road between Lopra and Sumba. There is also a road tunnel from Lopra to Sumba. For buses it is best to go to Sumba first and from there up to Hesturin (near the antenna), and on the way back turn the bus on Hesturin and go back to Sumba. The road from Hesturin to Lopra has many curves and can be difficult for buses to drive on. Another option is from Lopranseiði, which is west of Lopra; turn right just before entering the village; a road goes almost all the way to the coast. It is not far from the main road, less than 1 kilometre (0.62 mi). Beinisvørð can also be seen at a greater distance from Eggjarnar, just south of Vágur. A one-lane road goes to some 25 metres (82 ft) from the cliff's edge at Eggjarnar.
