= Sumba, Faroe Islands =

Sumba
- Municipality and village
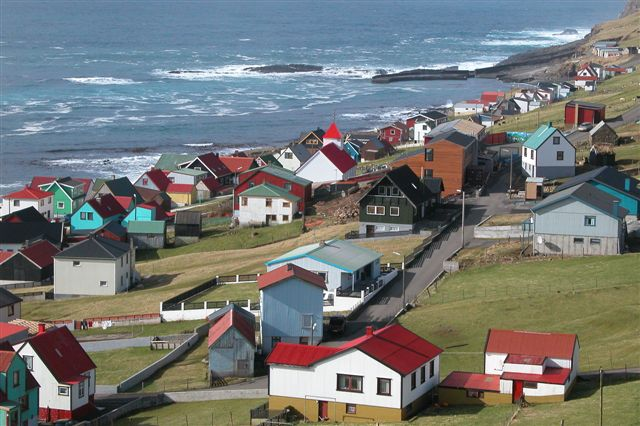

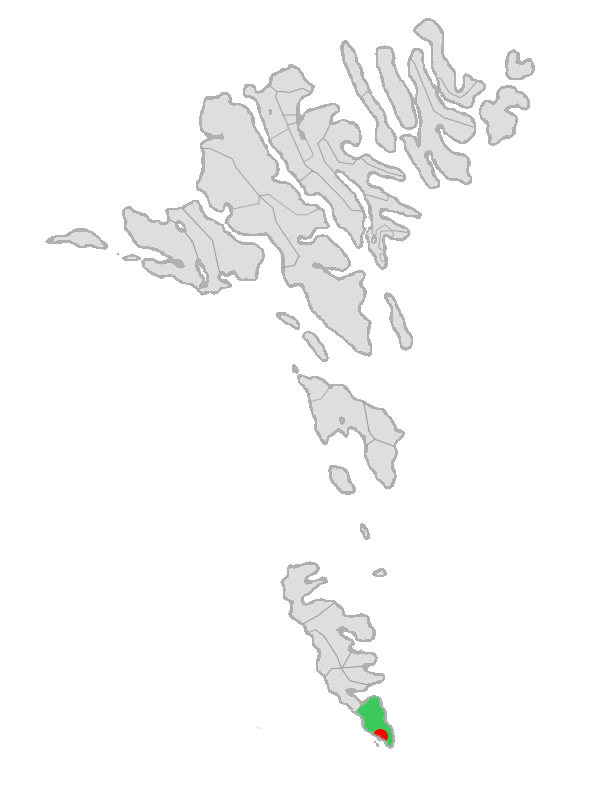
- Location of Sumba Municipality in the Faroe Islands

- Location of Sumba village in the Faroe Islands
- Coordinates: 61°24′21″N 6°42′19″W
- State: Kingdom of Denmark
- Constituent country: Faroe Islands
- Island: Suðuroy

Area
  - Municipality: 9.61 sq mi (24.89 km^{2})

Population (September 2025)
  - Municipality: 342
  - Municipality density: 35.6/sq mi (13.7/km^{2})
  - Village: 243
- Time zone: GMT
  - Summer (DST): UTC+1 (WEST)
- Postal code: FO 970
- Climate: Cfc
- Website: https://sumba.fo/

Sumba is the southernmost village of the Faroe Islands, located on the island of Suðuroy. It is located in Sumbiar Municipality.

== Municipality ==
The municipality has 342 inhabitants (as of March 2023). 254 of these people live in Sumba. The other villages in the Municipality of Sumba are: Lopra (76 inhabitants), Akrar (12 inhabitants), and formerly Víkarbyrgi (0 inhabitants).

Sumba is known for several things, including the high bird cliff of Beinisvørð and the local practice of Faroese chain dancing. They are very good dancers and have a long tradition for singing long songs along with the chain dance. Poul F. Joensen (born 1898 - died 1970) is one of the most famous Faroese poets; he was born in Sumba and grew up there. Later he got married and moved to Froðba.

Residents of the village are known as Sumbingar. The name Sumba or Sunnba is from the old name of the village which was Sunnbø/ba or Sunnbøur which means the southernmost village, but over the years misspellings by Danish rulers have led to the name Sumba. High mountains separate the village from the other settlements of the island. The village lies on the west coast as the only one on the island except from Fámjin. Sumba is said to be one of the oldest villages in the Faroe Islands. Excavations have shown traces from people from the 7th century. Sumba is an impressive village in its natural setting. The church in Sumba dates from 1887.

Sumba lies behind high mountains and it used to be difficult to reach in wintertime when the storms raged, but now there is a tunnel, which makes all transport much easier. Just outside the coast of Sumba is the islet of Sumbiarhólmur. In summertime men from Sumba take 7 or 8 rams out on the islet and collect them again in September. The rams gain much weight when they are grazing on Sumbiarhólmur, up to 30 pounds, and the meat gets much tastier according to the people from Sumba. In 1997 a tunnel was bored through the mountains from Lopra to Sumba. This makes life easier for people in Sumba who work in Vágur or Tvøroyri.

South of Sumba, just above the village of Lopra, visitors encounter a fork in the road. One way leads to the old, but passable mountain road to Sumba, the other leads to the long tunnel through the mountain, which is the more direct route to Sumba. Visitors who take the mountain road can stop near the birds' cliff of Beinisvørð, which rises vertically 470 metres above the sea. From the top, there are views over the sea, rocks and sea stacks far below. It is possible to climb Beinisvørð from the rear of the cliffs even if it is pretty steep. In 1975 a part of the top of Beinisvørð fell into the sea. The people from Sumba used to catch birds on Beinisvørð; some men have lost their lives because of it.

== Sports in Sumba ==
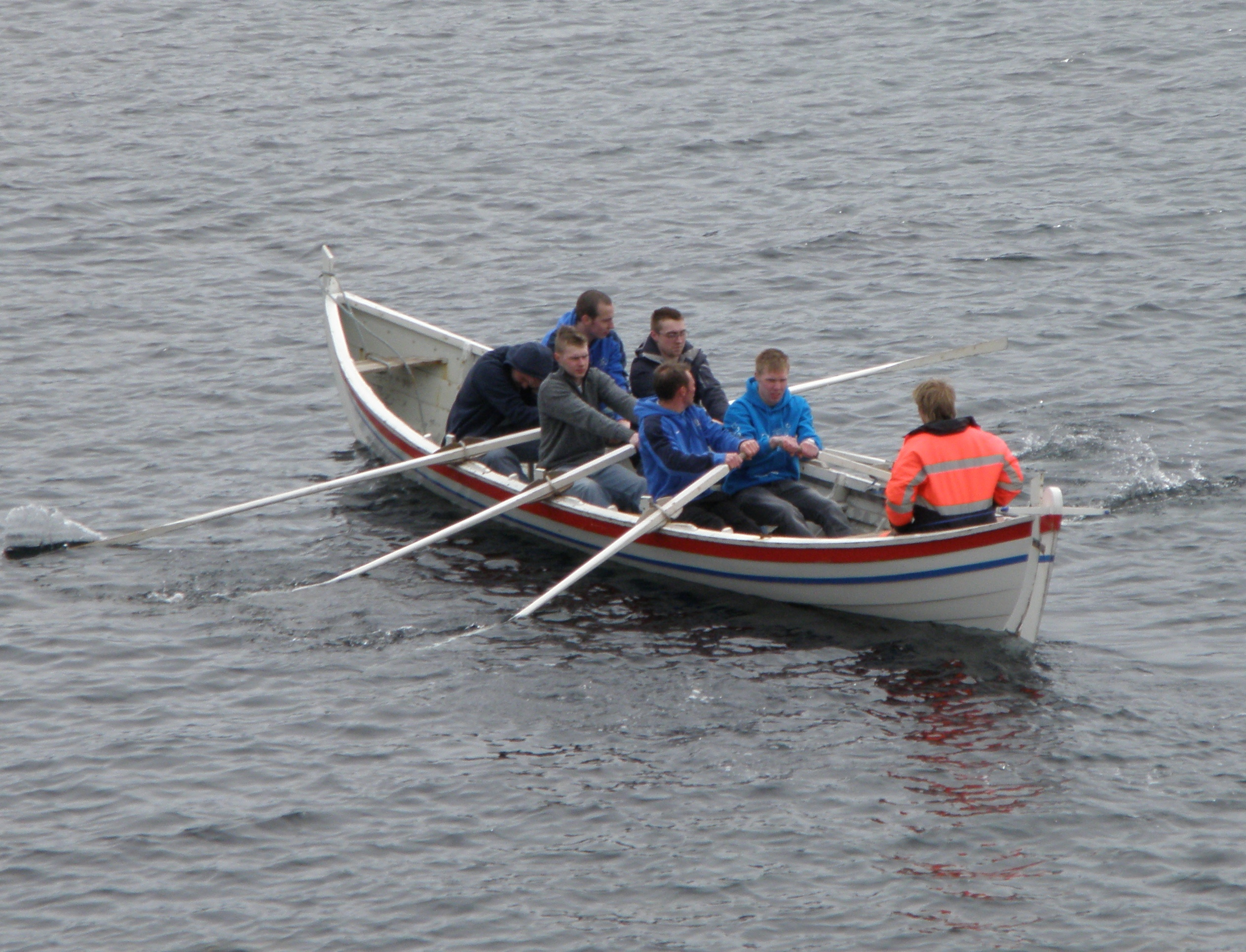
Broddur, a rowing boat from Sumba, which participated in the summer rowing races earlier.

Sumba had a sports club, Sunnbiar Ítróttarfelag, which was a football club and a rowing club. The football club played mostly in the second best division, but in 1990 they were promoted to the best division, where they played for one year and then they got relegated. In 2005 Sumba and VB Vágur merged into VB/Sumba, which changed their name into FC Suðuroy in 2010. The football field is used as a solar park from 2019.

The sports club of Sumba had two rowing boats, which competed in the rowing competitions which are held around the islands every summer, seven events all together. Sunnbingur is a 10-mannafar, which is the largest boat type which competes in these competitions, it was built in 1957 and participated from that year until 1965. They won several races and even sat a Faroese record. The other boat is called Broddur, it is a 5-mannafar, the current boat was built in 1974, and it is no longer in use for the FM races (FM is short for Føroya Meistari, which means Faroese Champion). It was however used in a local rowing race in Sumba in May 2012, when they arranged a festival where they opened a new museum with stuffed Faroese birds and historical items, they had art exhibitions, concerts, hiking trips, boat trips and a rowing competition in the sound between Sumba village and the islet Sumbiarhólmur just outside the village. The current is quite strong there so rowing is not easy, but two of three boats managed to complete the race.

== Gallery ==
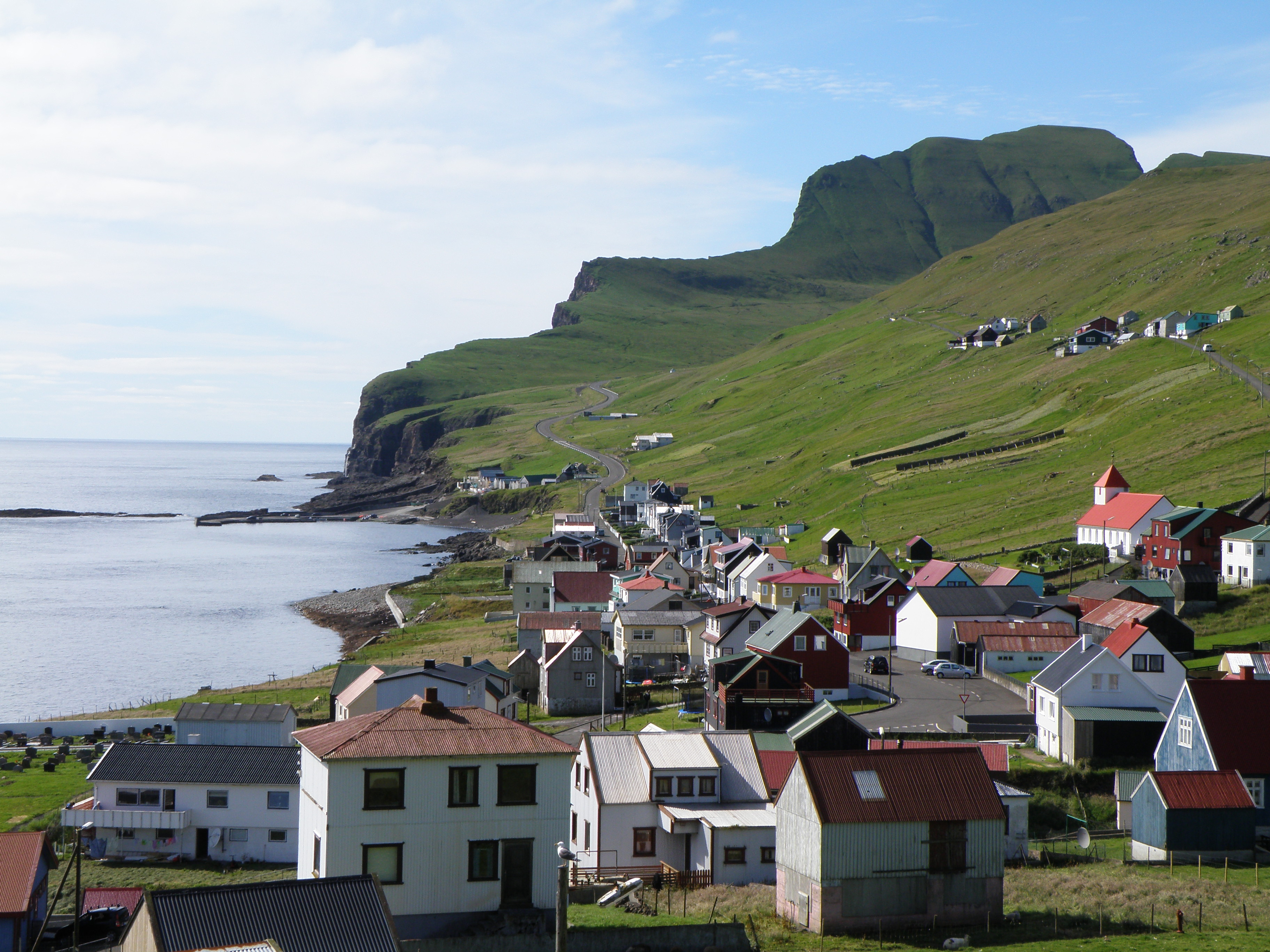
Sumba, Beinisvørð in the background

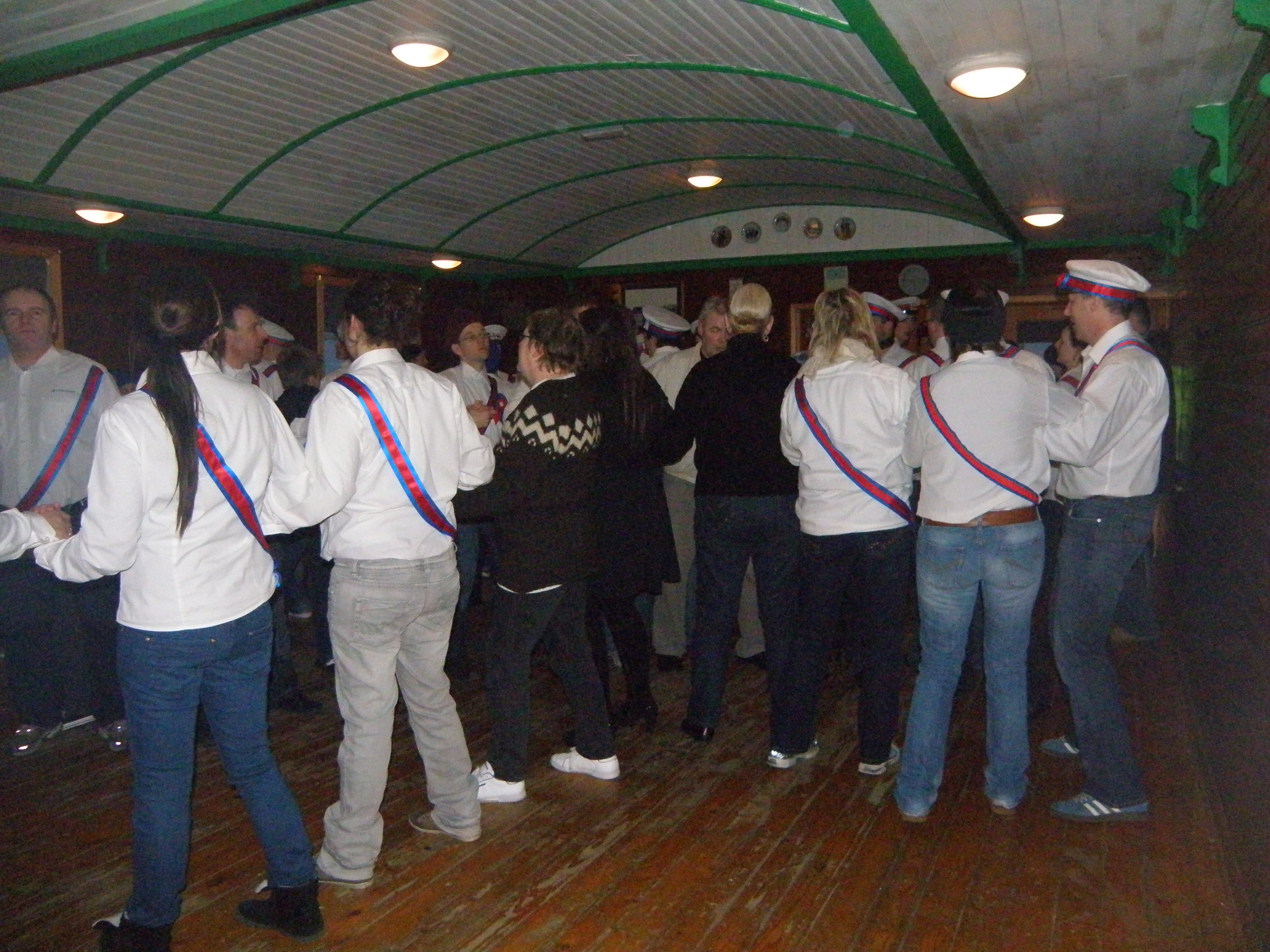
Faroese chain dance in Dansistovan in Sumba.

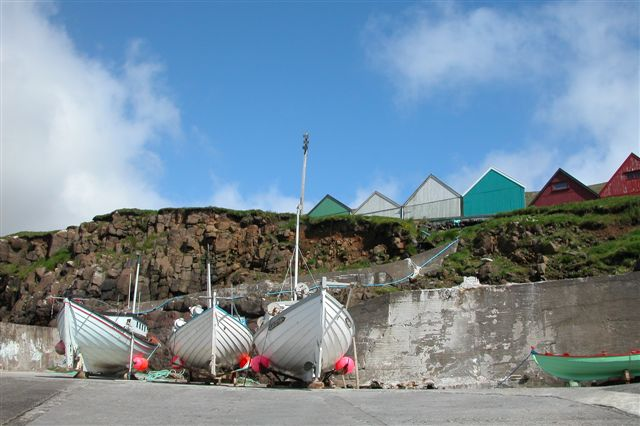
Harbour of Sumba

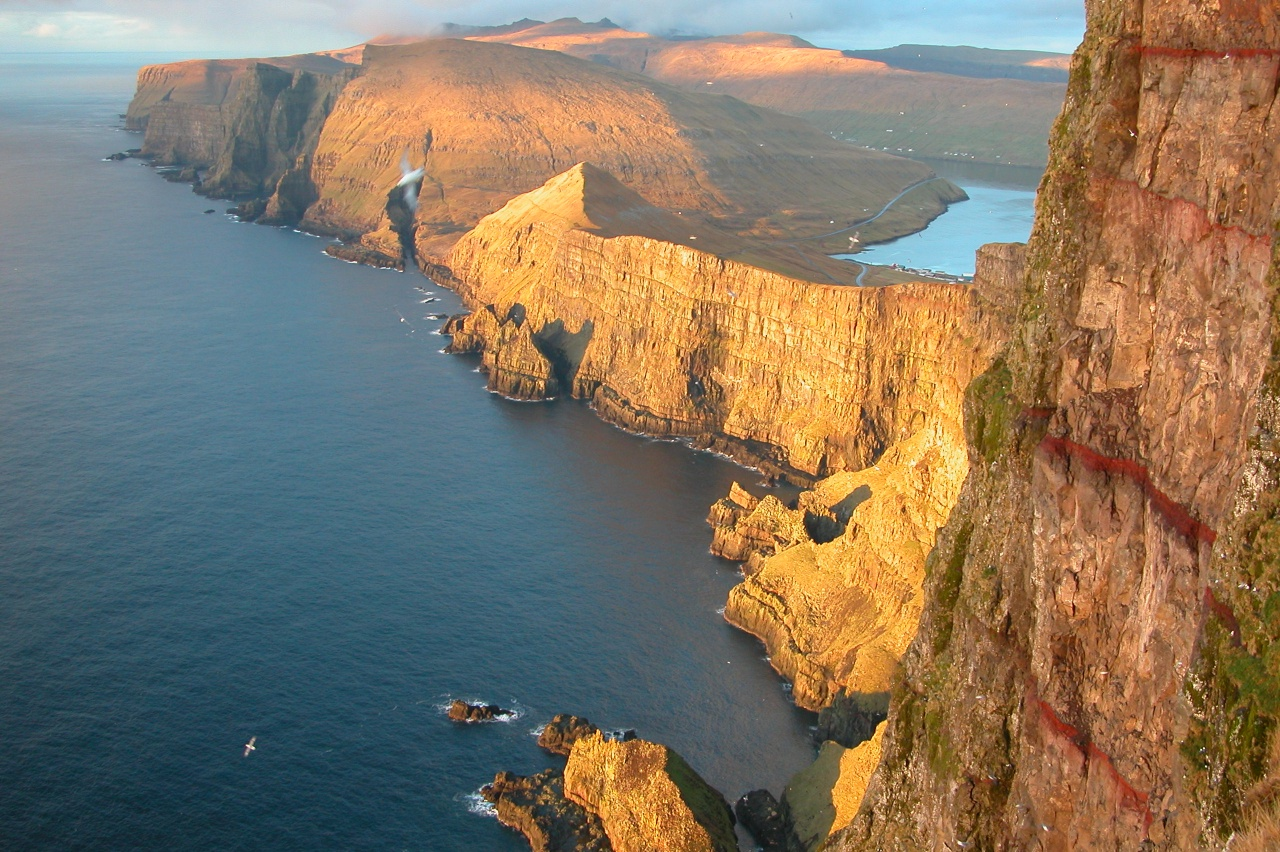
West coast north of Sumba, seen from Beinisvørð

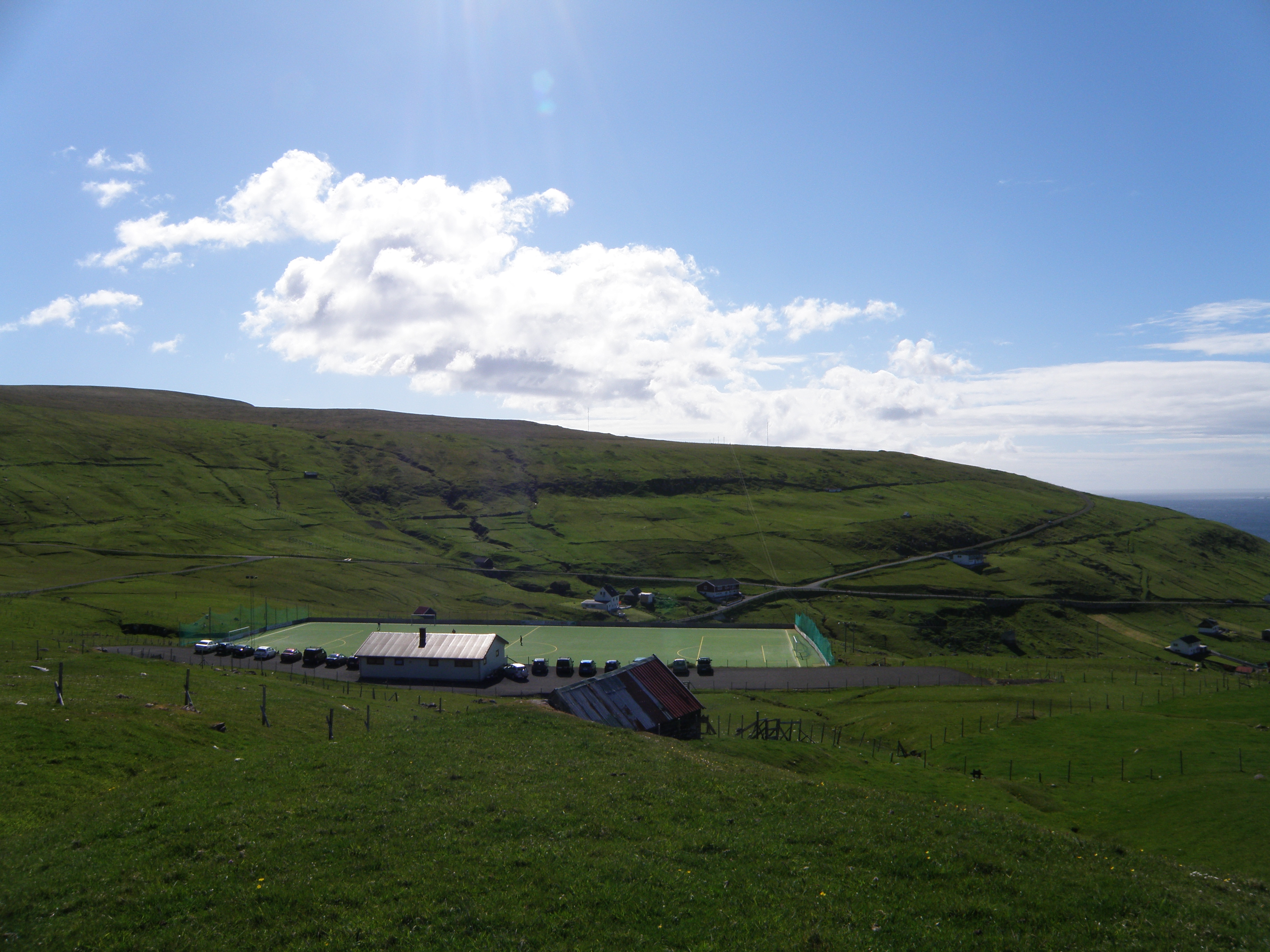
Á Krossi football field of Sumbiar Ítróttarfelag (Sumba Sports Club), now FC Suðuroy.

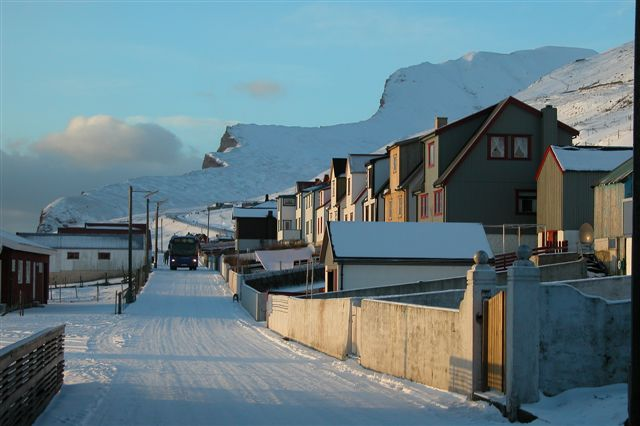
Sumba.

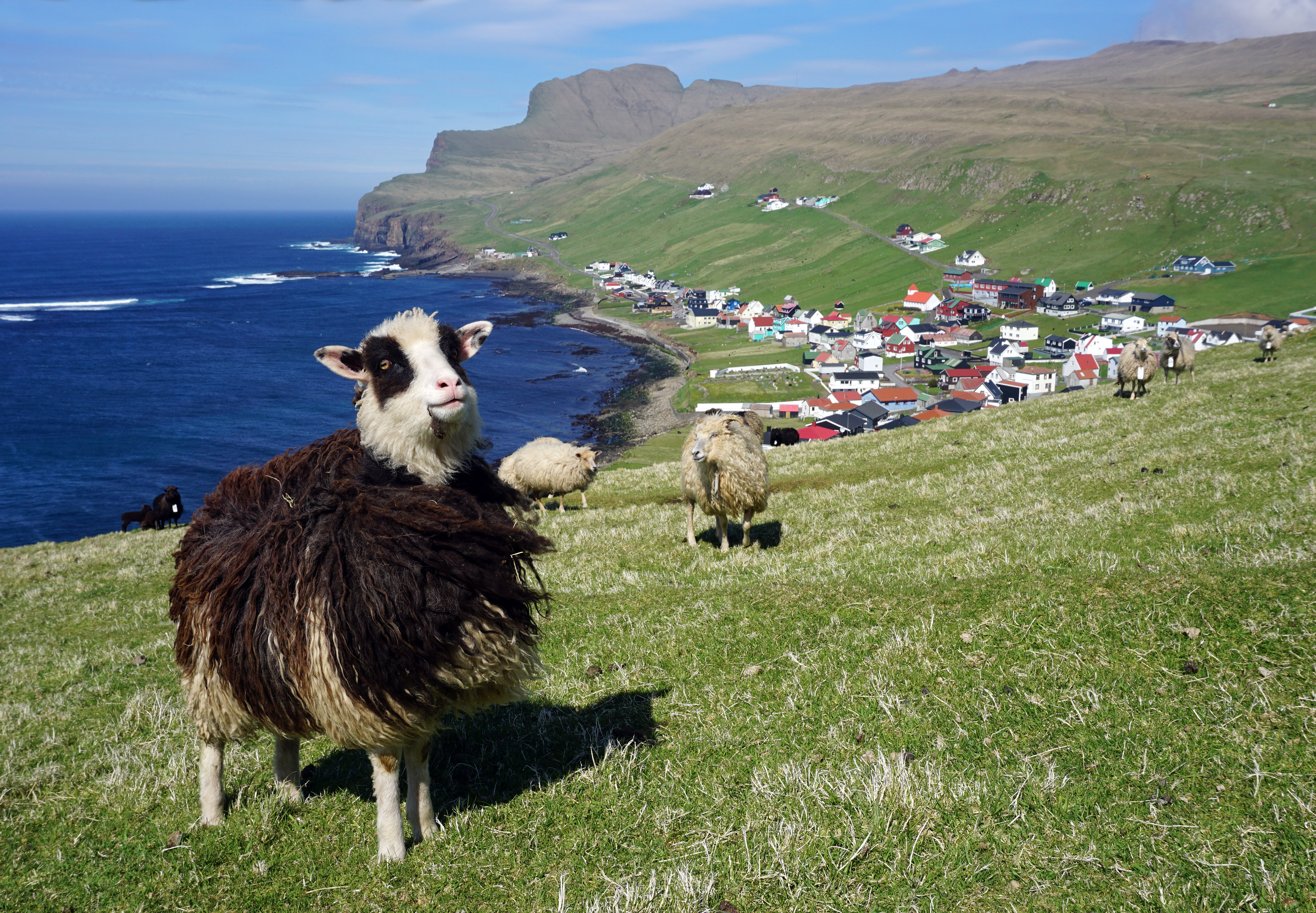
Faroe sheep with the town of Sumba in the background.

== See also ==
- List of towns in the Faroe Islands
