= Akrar =

- Village
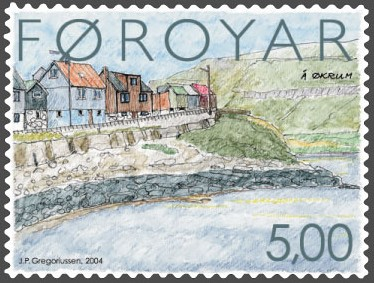
- Akrar on Suðuroy. Jákup Pauli Gregoriussen; Date of issue: 26 January 2004

- Location of the village in the Faroe Islands
- Coordinates: 61°27′20″N 6°45′33″W
- State: Kingdom of Denmark
- Constituent Country: Faroe Islands
- Island: Suðuroy
- Municipality: Sumba
- Founded: 1817

Population (29 April 2025)
  - Total: 11
- Time zone: UTC+0 (GMT)
  - Summer (DST): UTC+1 (EST)
- Climate: Cfc

Akrar (Danish: Øgrum) is a village in the Faroe Islands. The population was 13 in 2024.

It is located on Lopransfjørður, an inlet, which itself is part of Vágsfjørður, on the east-side of Suðuroy, and was founded in 1817.

== See also ==
- List of towns in the Faroe Islands
