= Samuel Jacob Sesanus Olsen =

Faroese teacher, writer and translator

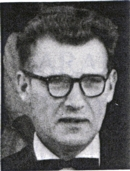
- Samuel Jacob Sesanus Olsen was a Faroese teacher, writer and translator.
- Born: 1 October 1904; Sandavágur, Faroe Islands
- Died: 13 October 1994 (aged 90); Copenhagen, Denmark

Samuel Jacob Sesanus Olsen, commonly known as Jacob Olsen (1 October 1904 – October 13, 1994), was a Faroese teacher, writer and translator. He was deeply engaged in the local community and the Faroe Islands as a whole.

== Biography ==
Jacob Olsen was born on 1 October 1904 in Sandavági, Faroe Islands. His parents were Peter Joen Pauli Olsen, fisherman, from Sandavágur and Lisbeth Olsen, born Magnussen, from Leynar.

Before Jacob Olsen studied at the Faroese Teachers School (Føroya Læraraskúli), he worked 15 months in business in Sandavágur and was at sea for a single year. In 1923 he was admitted to teacher education at the Faroese Teachers School in Tórshavn and graduated with a teaching diploma in 1926.

1 September 1926 he was hired by Tórshavn's School. On 1 February 1961 he became Vice Principal at the same school and held office until his retirement 31 October 1971, at the age of 67.

In the period 1928-1931 Jacob Olsen and Sámal Johansen were founders and editors of Barnablaðið (The Child Magazine). The numerous children's stories published in this magazine were the basis of the book Nú Breddar, which the Faroese Union of Teachers released in 1964 on the occasion of Jacob Olsen's 60th birthday.

During 1932-1933 Jacob Olsen studied English, geography, animal raising and plant cultivation at the State Teacher's College. His study of English was extended for another four years. In 1957-1958 he studied English, geography and librarianship at the Danish University of Education. For a number of years he was external examiner in written English at secondary school and in 9th and 10th grade.

His local activities included serving as member and President of the Health Commission in Froðba parish and changing member in the Equation Commission. He was also the organist at the Church of Tvøroyri for almost 25 years.

He did a number of translations into Faroese from English, Danish, and Norwegian. One such work was the children's book Kubbin by Anne-Cath. Vestly.

On 1 October 1933 Jacob Olsen married Olga Maria (born Hansen on 16 October 1903 in Tvøroyri), daughter of Sigvald and Hansina Hansen from Tvøroyri. (Sigvald was born in Stokke in Norway.)

Jacob Olsen moved with his wife to Copenhagen in the early 1970s, where he continued his translation work, and gave private lessons in English until his death of natural causes on 13 October 1994 at the age of 90 years. His wife Olga Olsen died of a cerebral haemorrhage in the year 1978.

== Authorship ==
The Faroese Teachers' Association's Publishing Company has published all of Jacob Olsen's work:

- 1951 Regin in 'Mín jólabók'
- 1953 Símun og flúgvimaskinan in 'Mín jólabók'
- 1964 Nú breddar
- 1971 Høgni og Gunnar in 'Sig mær eina søgu 1'
