= Tvøroyri Municipality =

Tvøroyri Municipality Tvøroyrar kommuna (Faroese)
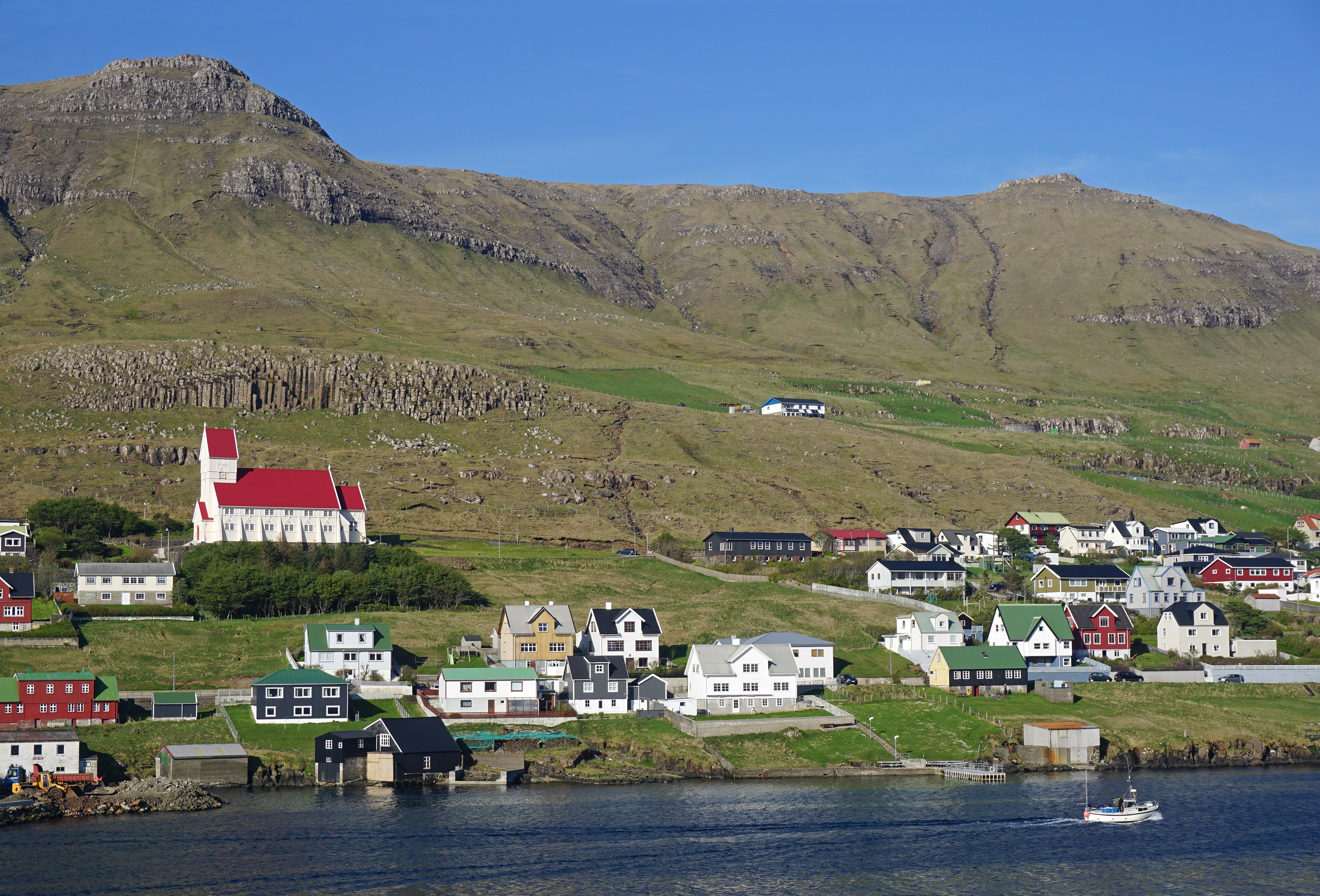

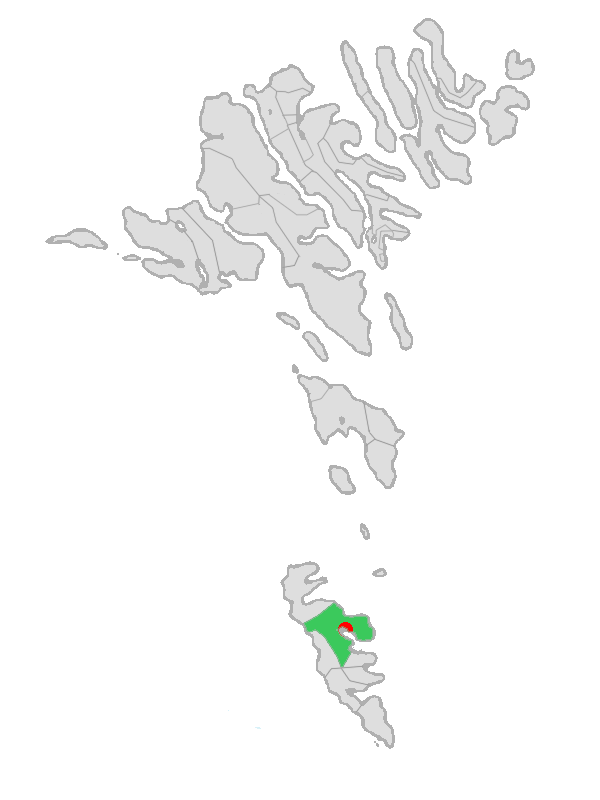
- Coordinates: 61.555833°N 6.803333°W
- State: Kingdom of Denmark
- Constituent country: Faroe Islands
- Islands: Suðuroy

Area
  - Total: 43 km^{2} (17 sq mi)

Population (January 2024)
  - Total: 1,750
  - Density: 41/km^{2} (110/sq mi)
- Website: www.tvk.fo

Tvøroyri Municipality (Faroese: Tvøroyrar kommuna) is a municipality of the Faroe Islands with Tvøroyri as its administrative centre.

The municipality is one of 7 on the island of Suðuroy and covers most of the northeast portion.

It contains the following towns and villages:

- Tvøroyri
- Trongisvágur
- Froðba
- Øravíkarlíð
- Øravík

== Politics ==
=== Municipal council ===
Tvøroyri's municipal council consists of 7 members, elected every four years.

Election	Party			Total seats	Turnout	Elected mayor
Election	C	G	T	Total seats	Turnout	Elected mayor
2016	3	1	3	7	90.1%	Kristin Michelsen (T)
2020	3		4	7	90.1%	Kristin Michelsen (T)
Data from Kvf.fo
