= Trongisvágsfjørður =

Fjord on the island of Suðuroy in the Faroe Islands

Coordinates: 61°32′41″N 6°47′39″W

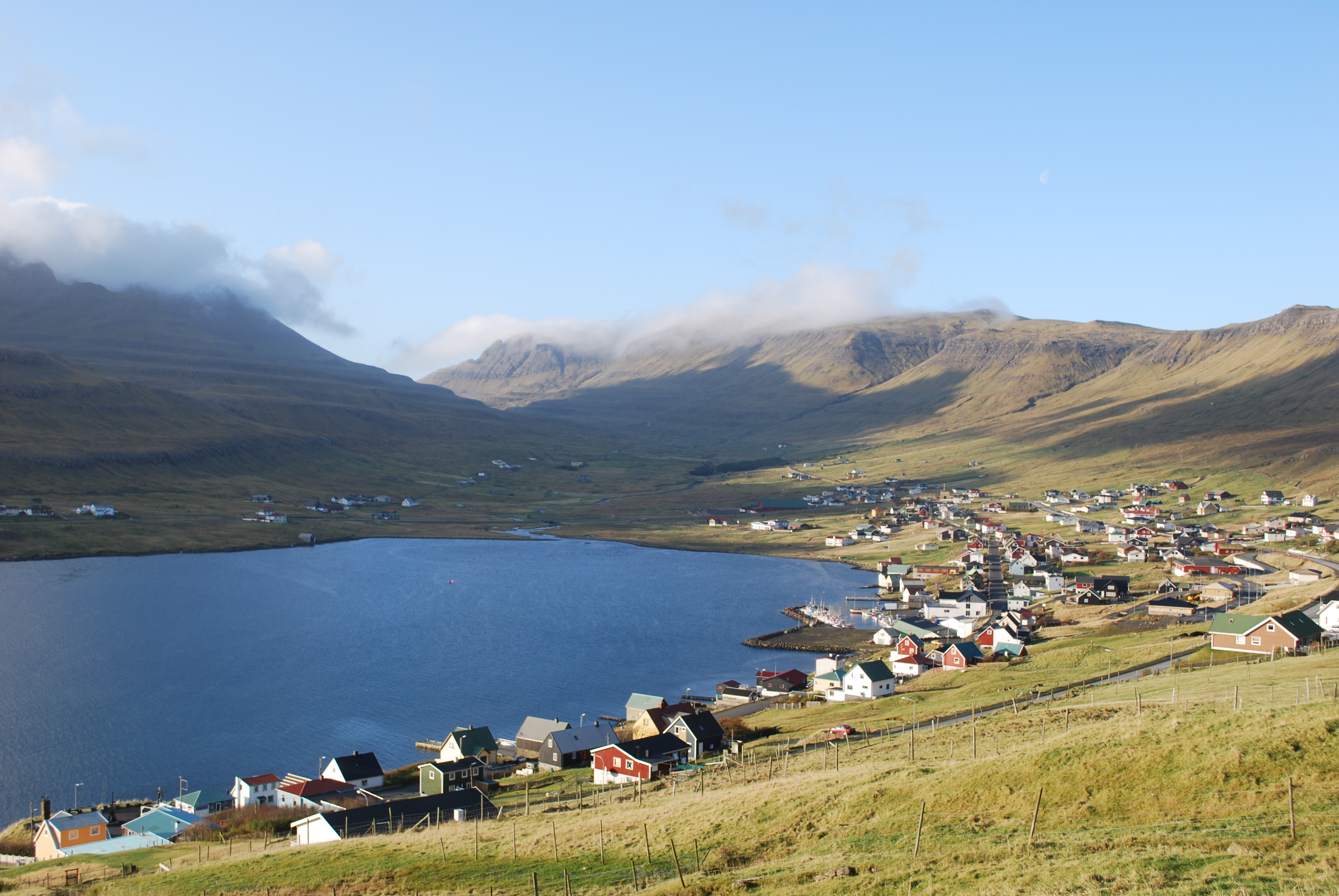
Trongisvágsfjørður and the villages of Tvøroyri and Trongisvágur. Tvøroyri is to the left, Trongisvágur is a bit further to the right and at the bottom of the fjord.

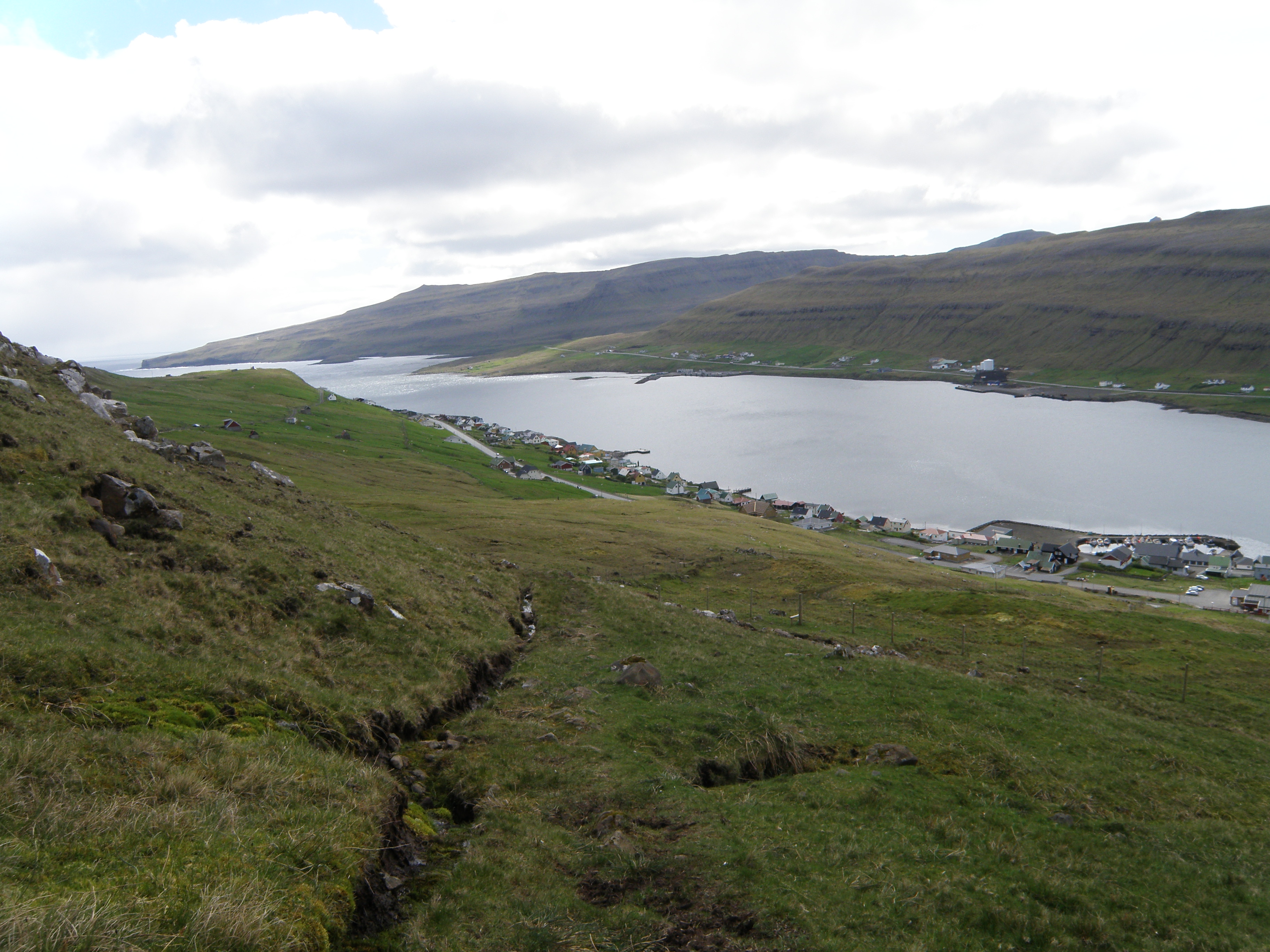
Trongisvágsfjørður seen from the northern side of the fjord, from the hiking path to Hvannhagi. Krambatangi ferry port and the Saltsilo on Drelnes are visible.

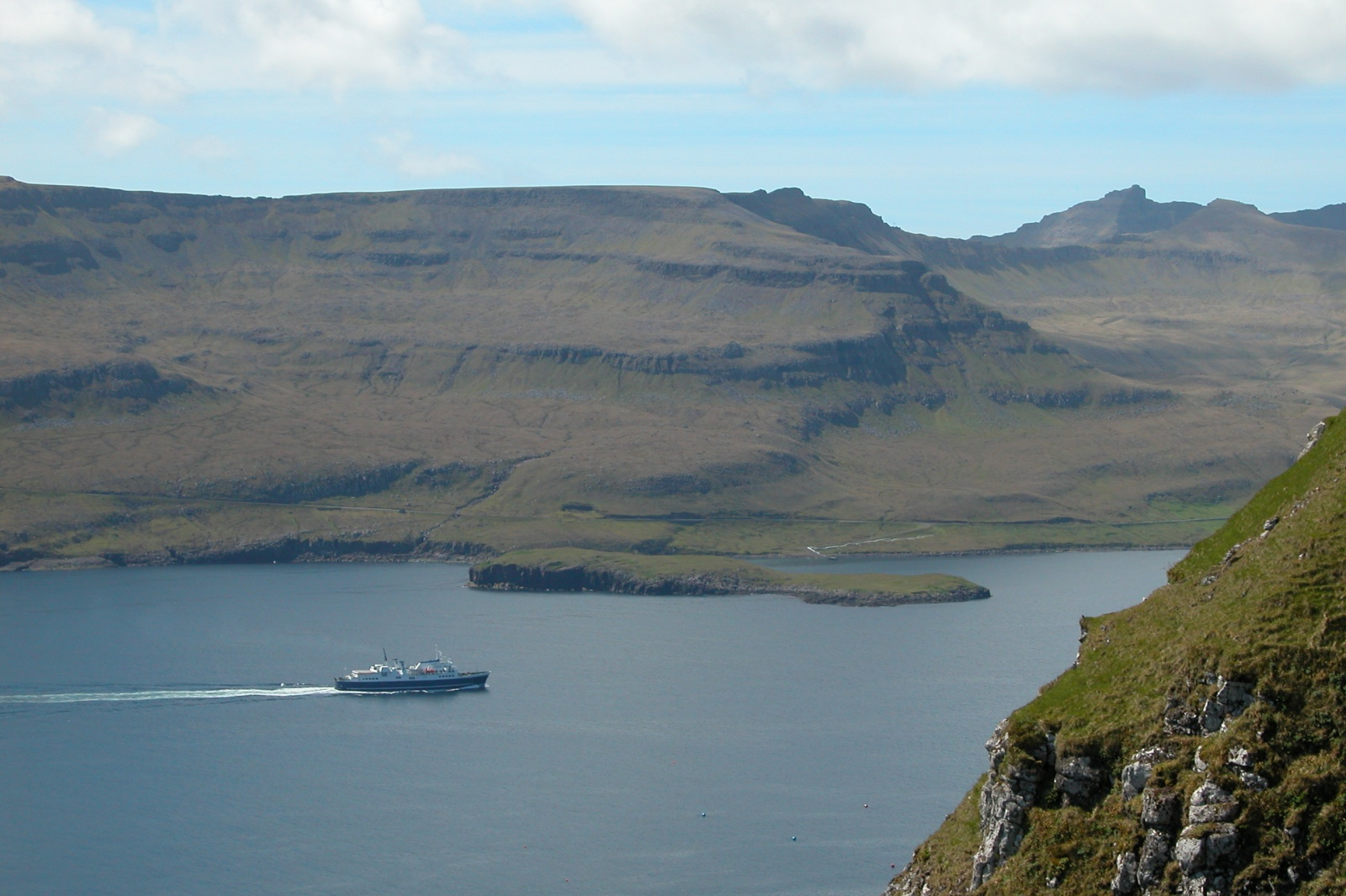
Trongisvágsfjørður and Tjaldavíksholmur, the ferry Smyril is approaching the port of Krambatangi.

Trongisvágsfjørður is a fjord on the island of Suðuroy in the Faroe Islands. There are four villages around the fjord. Furthest east on the northern side of the fjord is Froðba, in the bottom of the fjord is Trongisvágur. In between Trongisvágur and Froðba is Tvøroyri, the largest of these villages. South of Trongisvágur in a bay is Øravík, a part of Øravík is called Øravíkarlíð, it is located close to Trongisvágur and not visible from Øravík. These villages are in the Municipality of Tvøroyri.

== The ferry port on Krambatangi ==
The ferry port of Krambatangi is on the southern side of the fjord between Trongisvágur and Øravík. The ferry port was on Drelnes before 2005 when the new ferry Smyril arrived, which necessitated building a new ferry port. Drelnes is just a few hundred metres further east than Krambatangi.

== The Salt Silo on Drelnes ==
There is an old Salt Silo on Drelnes which is a ruin, but there is a plan called Project Salt which intends to restore the Saltsilo into a concert hall and cultural house. There was a big concert there in May 2010. All the bands played for free in order to support the project.
