= Smyril =

Smyril may refer to:

- Smyril Line
- MS Smyril
