= Hov, Faroe Islands =

Hov
- Village and municipality
- Hov Municipality; Hovs kommuna (Faroese)
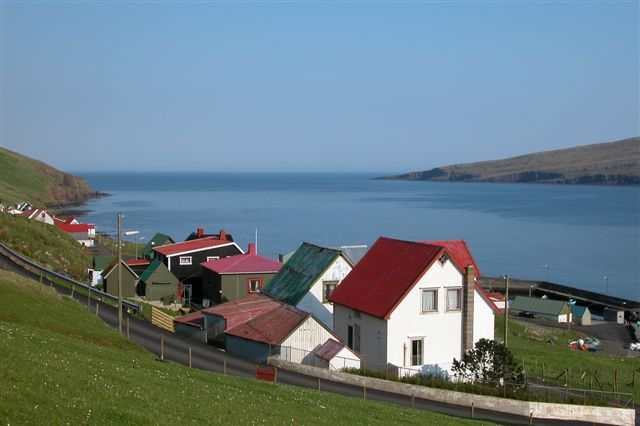
- Hov, view towards east

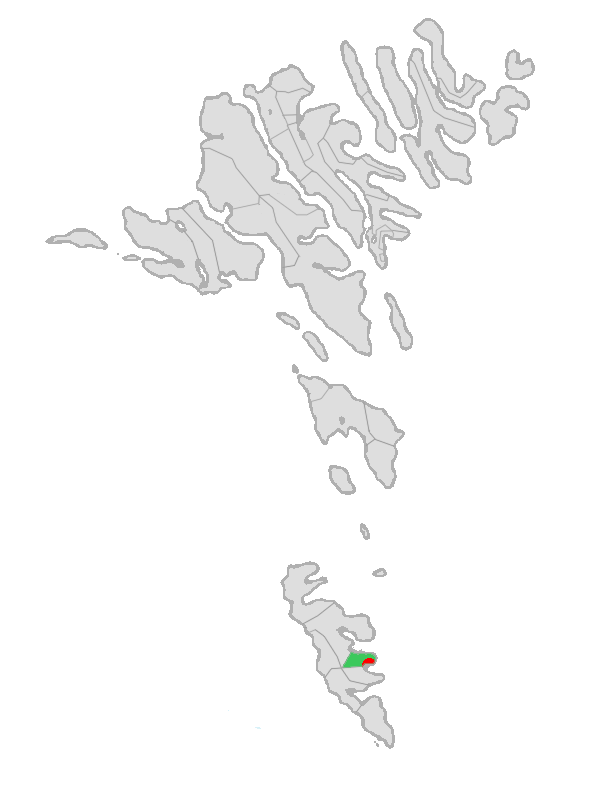
- Location of Hovs kommuna in the Faroe Islands

- Location of Hov village in the Faroe Islands
- Coordinates: 61°30′30″N 6°45′29″W
- State: Kingdom of Denmark
- Constituent country: Faroe Islands
- Island: Suðuroy
- Municipality: Hovs

Population (September 2025)
  - Total: 106
- Time zone: GMT
  - Summer (DST): UTC+1 (WEST)
- Postal code: FO 960
- Climate: Cfc

Hov is a village located on Suðuroy's east coast, in the Faroe Islands; it is frequently mentioned in the country's history.

Salmon sea farming has been practiced in Hov since the 1980s. North of Hov along the old road to Øravík are interesting basalt columns that march along the hills.

== The Church ==
The wooden church in Hov was originally built in Vágur on Kirkjukletti in 1862. It was moved to Hov in 1942. A new church was built in Vágur, it was ready in 1939, after that they could start to take down the old church and move it to Hov, as it was promised 25 years earlier in 1914.

== Hovstunnilin - The Hov-Øravík tunnel ==
In 2007, the road tunnel "Hovstunnilin" opened. In addition to connecting the villages of Hov and Øravík, it connects the southern and the northern parts of the island. It is no longer necessary to drive over the mountain, which can be difficult in wintertime. Now, it takes only 20 minutes to drive from Tvøroyri to Vágur. The tunnel is 2.5 km (or 1.55 mi) long.

== Viking History - Viking Chief Havgrímur ==
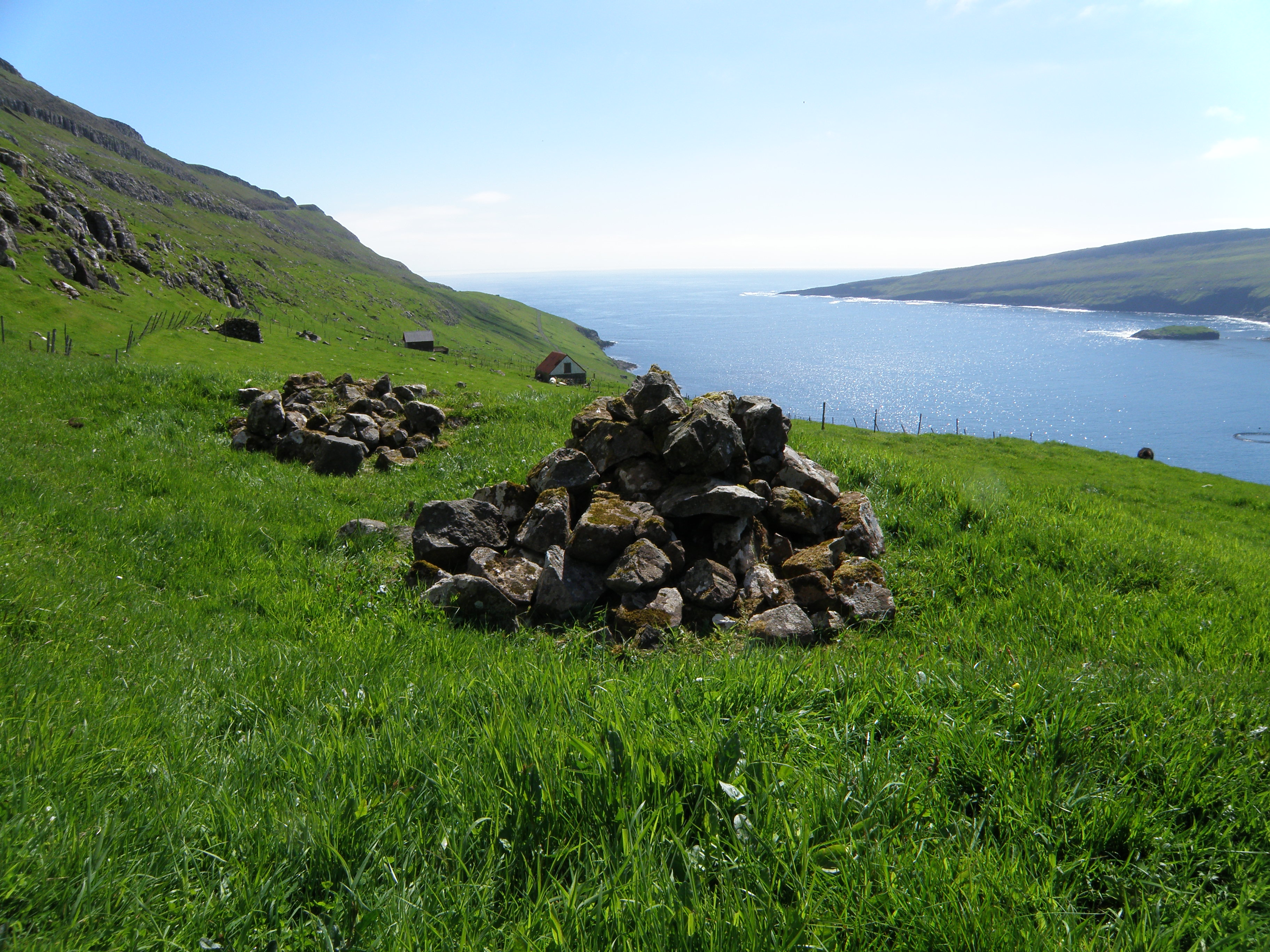
The graves of Chieftain Havgrímur and his horse.

According to the Faroese Sagas and local tradition, the first Viking settler on Suðuroy established a farm in Hov, which is said to be named after his pagan hof. His grave is at "undir Homrum" in Hov and is the only chieftain burial site to be found on the Faroes. Hov lies in the middle of the island and the area is flat and wide with a good view out to sea. This enabled Suðuroy's first settlers to follow exactly what was happening on the sea around.

The viking Havgrímur who was chief of half of the country lived in Hov in the 10th century. His burial plot is located in the hills above the village, but was largely destroyed when opened in by amateur archaeologists in 1834.

== The area west of Hov ==
West of Hov is a waterfall with the name Foldarafossur. It lies in Hovsá, which runs from Vatnsnes and is the line of demarcation between the villages of Porkeri and Hov. The waterfall is formed at the place where Hovsá runs over the edge at Foldarshamri, and a bit further to the south there is a mountain pass which is called Foldarsskarð. These three place names all have the same origin, and linguists think that the name comes from the soil (in Faroese also foldin) below these localities.

Approx. 30 years ago, the electricity company SEV commenced construction work in Hovsdal, so that the hydropower could be converted into electricity, and a dam was built approx. ½ km west of Foldarafoss. Therefore, the waterfall does not have the same power as before, but if it rains a lot, and water flows out over the dam, the waterfall may show some of its old power.

== Myri Museum - The Old Shop ==
There is an old building down in the harbour of Hov, which now is a museum, an art gallery and a café. The eastern part of the house is called Fiskastovan. The western part of the house has been a shop until sometime in 1980s. Other parts of the house and the area around it has been used for clip fish industry, the fish was dried outside the house on the flat stones. A white flag was raised in order to let people in the village know when there was work for them. That was before the phone was a possibility. The house was in bad shape a few years ago, but now it has been restored. Some interesting items and old books with peoples names and how much they earned etc. are still in the house. The house was first located in Vágur, but it was moved to Hov, just like the church was. Fiskastovan á Mýri is used for many different purposes: Art exhibitions, café, small concerts, lectures, dinner for groups etc.

== Gallery ==
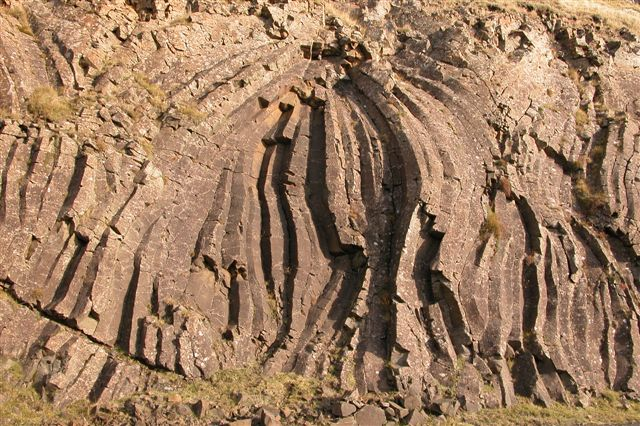
Basalt formations, "The old women", north of Hov in Hovsegg

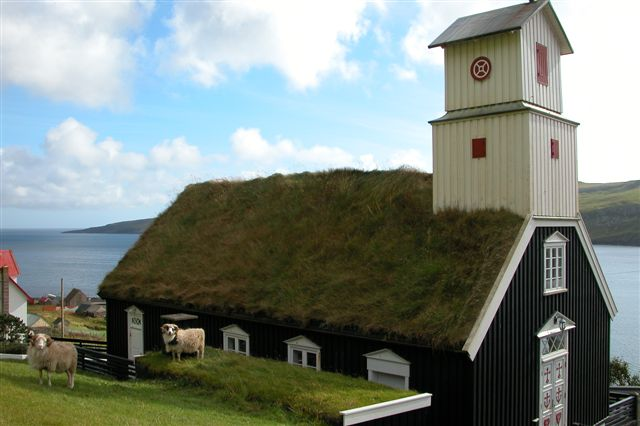
Church of Hov

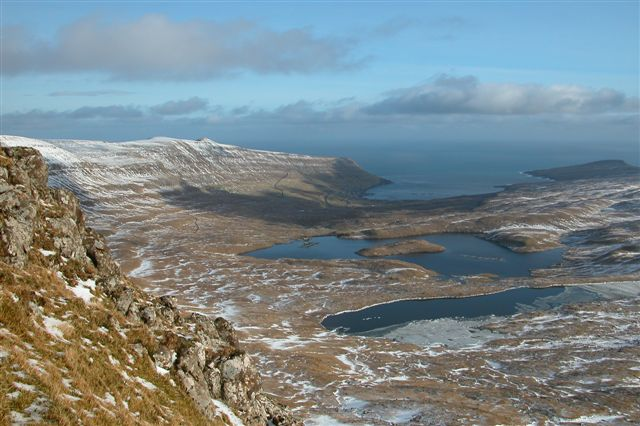
Hovsdalur, the valley of Hov, west of the village

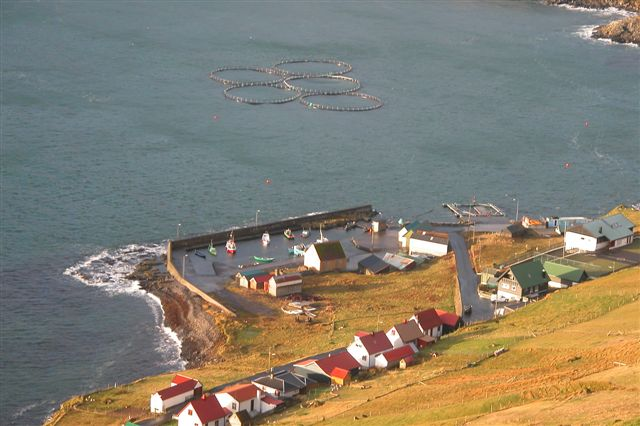
The harbour of Hov and the Old Shop

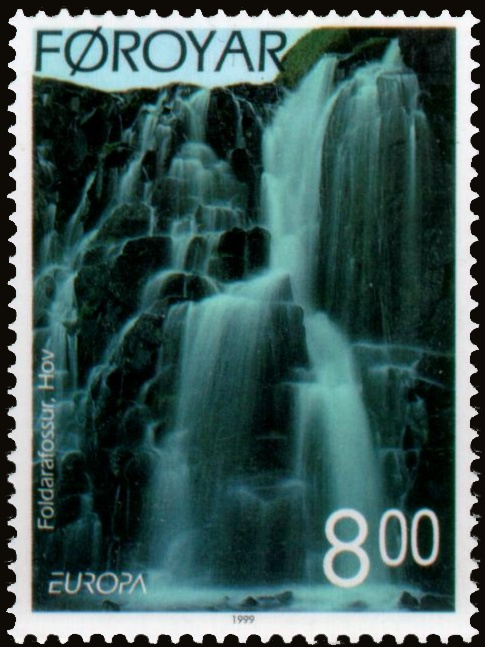
Waterfalls: Foldarafossur, Postverk Føroya

== See also ==
- List of towns in the Faroe Islands
