= Kubbin =

Book series by Anne-Catharina Vestly

Kubbin, is a collection of 17 tales for children. The tales were published in book form by the Faroese Teachers' Association's Publishing Company in 1974. Originally, the tales were written by the Norwegian writer Anne-Catharina Vestly whereupon the tales were translated into Faroese by Samuel Jacob Sesanus Olsen in the book Kubbin.

== Table of contents ==
The titles on the 17 tales in the Kubbin are following:

- Kubbin
- Kubbin í krambúðini
- Kubbin í bundnum jakka
- Yrkismaður
- Mamman verður krambúðargenta
- Lítlibeiggi bjargar eini pannukøku
- Hjá snikkaranum
- Heim í myrkri
- Filippus stóribeiggi eigur vekjara
- Lítlibeiggi og Kubbin bukka
- Ruskveður
- Tanta Allastaðni og líla
- Eisini pápin sær yvir seg
- Húsið við ongum vindeygum
- Jólagrýlur
- Jólatræsveitsla
- Teir vitja prinsessuna
