= MS Smyril =

Passenger and car ferry

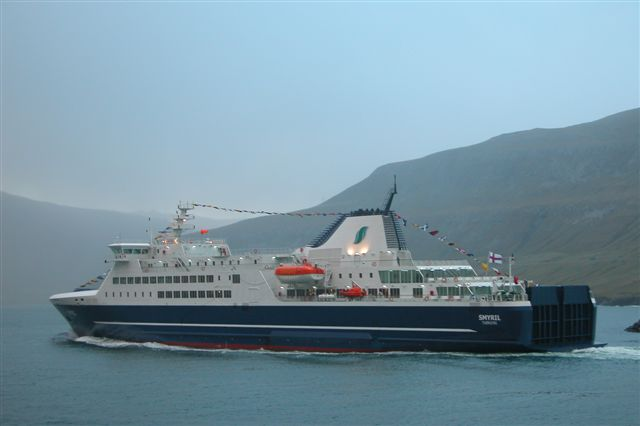
- Smyril

History
- Name: 2005 onwards: Smyril
- Owner: 2005 onwards: Strandfaraskip Landsins
- Operator: 2005 onwards: Strandfaraskip Landsins
- Port of registry: 2005 onwards: Tvøroyri, Faroe Islands
- Builder: IZAR
- Yard number: 399
- Identification: IMO number: 9275218; Call sign: XPWG
- Status: In service

General characteristics
- Tonnage: 12,650 GT
- Length: 138 m (452 ft 9 in)
- Beam: 22.7 m (74 ft 6 in)
- Draught: 5.60 m (18 ft 4 in)
- Installed power: 4 × MAN B&W 7L 32/40 diesel engines
- Propulsion: 2 × controllable pitch propellers; 2 × KaMeWa bow thrusters
- Speed: 21 knots
- Capacity: 976 passengers; 200 cars

The Smyril is a passenger and car ferry owned and operated by the Faroese transport company Strandfaraskip Landsins. She is the largest ferry in the fleet and the fifth vessel to carry the name Smyril, which is the Faroese word for merlin. The ferry takes 200 cars and 975 passengers.

The ferry services Suðuroy with 2-3 daily trips from Tórshavn to Krambatangi. The trip takes 2 hours and 5 minutes. Strandfaraskip Landsins meets all arrivals and departures with buses to Vágur, Tvøroyri and Hvalba, while dial-a-ride services link the ferry to/from other villages, including Fámjin.

== History ==
The current Smyril was built at the IZAR shipyard in San Fernando, Spain. She entered service on the 15 October 2005.

== Previous vessels ==
Since the 1890s the Strandfaraskip Landsins have operated five different ships named Smyril.

=== Smyril (I) ===
Smyril I was built in the 1890s and began as a smaller transport boat in Tvøroyri in the Faroe Islands.

=== Smyril (II) ===
Smyril II was built in Frederikshavn in Denmark in 1931, arriving in the Faroe Islands in 1932. It was much more modern than the first Smyril, it had a large saloon with sofas, and it even had a small saloon for smokers. The ferry was welcomed with song and music on the harbour of Tórshavn. Two days after arrival, the ferry started to sail on route between the islands. It sailed from Tórshavn, the capital, to many villages, i.e. to the villages on the eastern side of Eysturoy, to the villages on the eastern side of Sandoy and to several of the villages on the eastern side of Suðuroy, to the village Vestmanna, which is on the west coast of Streymoy and to Vágar island and sometimes also to smaller island like Mykines and Nólsoy. Smyril II also sailed to Klaksvík. Smyril I left the Faroe Islands on the same day as the new ferry started on her route, after sailing between the islands in 35 years.

=== Smyril (III) ===
Smyril III was built in Tórshavn, at the shipyard Tórshavnar Skipasmiðja, in 1967. It was a modern fast-moving and seaworthy vessel. With the new Smyril the sailing time between Torshavn and Tvøroyri was reduced from four to three hours. Smyril III could accommodate 300 passengers, but with the changes that were made in the infrastructure in the Faroes in the 1970s, the need for a larger vessel, a real car-ferry, grew to cover the community’s requirements.

=== Smyril (IV) ===
Smyril IV was built in 1969 as MV Morten Mols for the Danish shipping company Mols-Linien and bought by Strandfaraskip Landsins in 1975. It began to show signs of wear against the strong Faroese elements in the mid 1990s and by 2003 it was facing extreme difficulties in sailing through the strong currents of the islands. It was eventually replaced and taken out of operation in October 2005 with Smyril V.

== New harbour ==
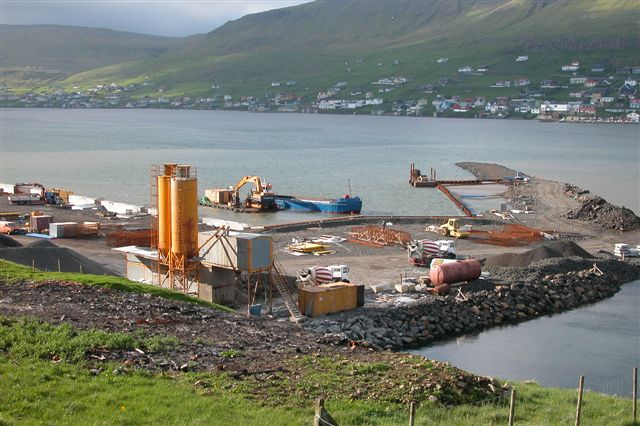
The new harbour at Krambatangi under construction in 2003.

A new harbour was built to accommodate the fifth Smyril in 2004. It is called Krambatangi and is situated on the southern side of the Trongisvágsfjørður, opposite Tvøroyri. More precisely, it is located between the villages of Trongisvágur and Øravík, in a hamlet named Øravíkarlíð. The old dock was called Drelnes is situated further inland and remains in use as an industrial and cultural area.

The new ferry terminal also served to centralise traffic from Suðuroy to the rest of the country. Until 2005, the Suðuroy ferry had scheduled departures to Tórshavn from alternatingly Tvøroyri (Drelnes) and Vágur, but the larger ferry, modern terminal and the opening of the Hovstunnilin in 2007 enabled the closure of the branch to Vágur. In earlier days, Smyril ferries would occasionally call at Skálavík, Sandoy.

== See also ==
Smyril Line, the ferry service between Denmark, Iceland and the Faroe Islands, which operates the vessel MS Norröna.
