= Krambatangi =

Ferry port of Suðuroy in the Faroe Islands

Coordinates: 61.5481°N 6.8185°W

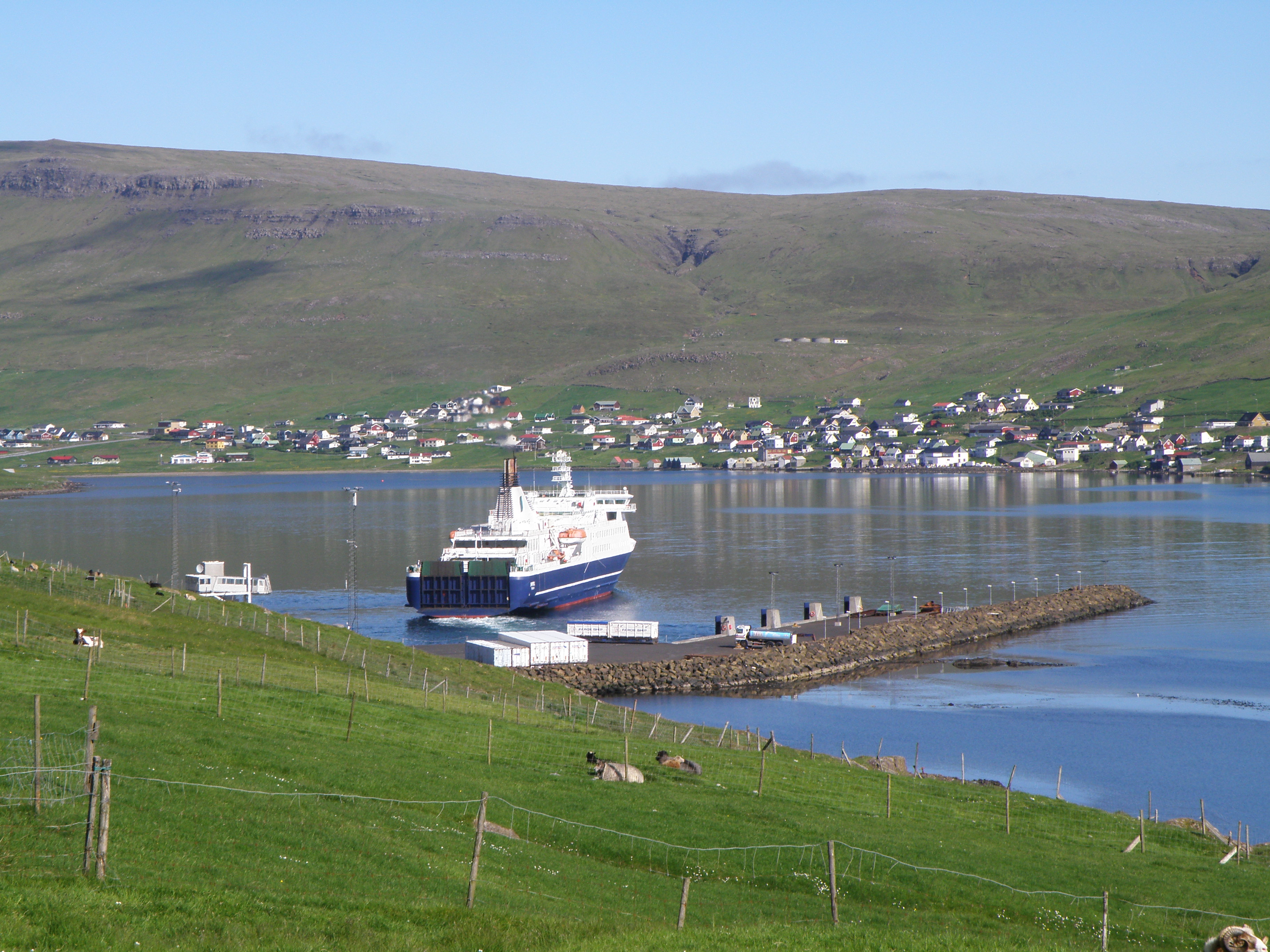
MS Smyril leaving Krambatangi ferryport on 19 June 2010.

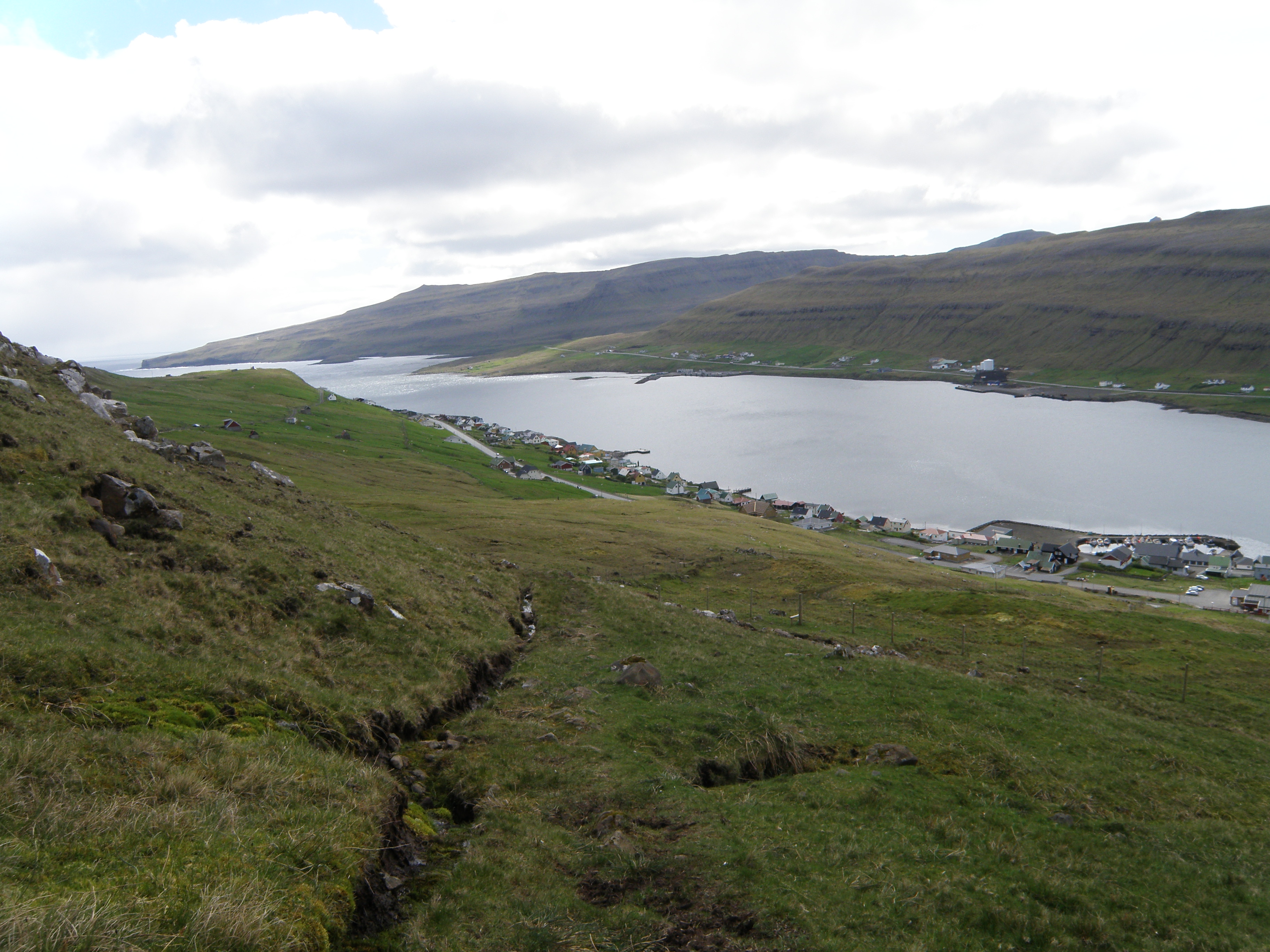
Trongisvágsfjørður, Tvøroyri and Trongisvágur. Krambatangi ferry port is on the southern side of the fjord.

Krambatangi is the ferry port of Suðuroy in the Faroe Islands. The ferry MS Smyril M/F disembarks 2–3 times daily from Krambatangi to Tórshavn. Krambatangi is located on the southern side of Trongisvágsfjørður halfway between Trongisvágur and Øravík, opposite Tvøroyri. The ferry port was earlier on Drelnes, which is a few hundred metres further east of Krambatangi. But in 2005 a new ferry arrived, which was much bigger than the prior one, and therefore required a new ferryport at Krambatangi. Krambatangi does not belong to the municipality of Tvøroyri, and there have been some disagreements between the Tvøroyri municipality and Strandfaraskip Landsins (SSL) because they didn't pay harbour dues for entering the port of Tvøroyri. The Faroese court decided that SSL ought to pay for entering the port of Tvøroyri, but SSL appealed the verdict.
