= Strok =

Faroese children's magazine

Strok, formerly Barnablaðið (English: 'Children's magazine'), is the Faroe Islands' oldest children's magazine, dating to 1928. All pupils in the Faroe Islands are given the opportunity to subscribe to the popular magazine, which is not sold in stores. The magazine has changed names several times in its history, and is now known as Strok. Since its beginnings, the magazine has featured moral lessons. It has since expanded into modern forms of media, such as music videos.

== History ==
The first issue was published around Christmas 1928 and was regularly published in its original form for the following three years, after which the editors wanted to change the editorial style. Teachers in Suðuroy comprised the editorial board, while the Faroese Teachers' Association published the magazine. Among its editors were founders Samuel Jacob Sesanus Olsen and Sámal Johansen, the latter of whom was replaced by Martin Joensen in September 1930. From the first issue, it included news, stories, rhymes, puzzles, and pictures. The new editorial board in 1931, including Jacob Olsen and Martin Joensen, encouraged children to take an active part by writing to the magazine and submitting questions, stories, and poems. In addition, the editors focused on moral lessons, such as obedience to one's parents, kindness to animals, and honoring one's country, in order to become good men and women.

The magazine's layout was 17 by 22 centimetres (6.7 in × 8.7 in), printed on newsprint. It cost 3 DKK per year and was published twice a month.

== See also ==
- Education in the Faroe Islands
- Faroese literature
