= Porkeri Church =

Church in the Faroe Islands

Coordinates: 61.4808°N 6.7463°W

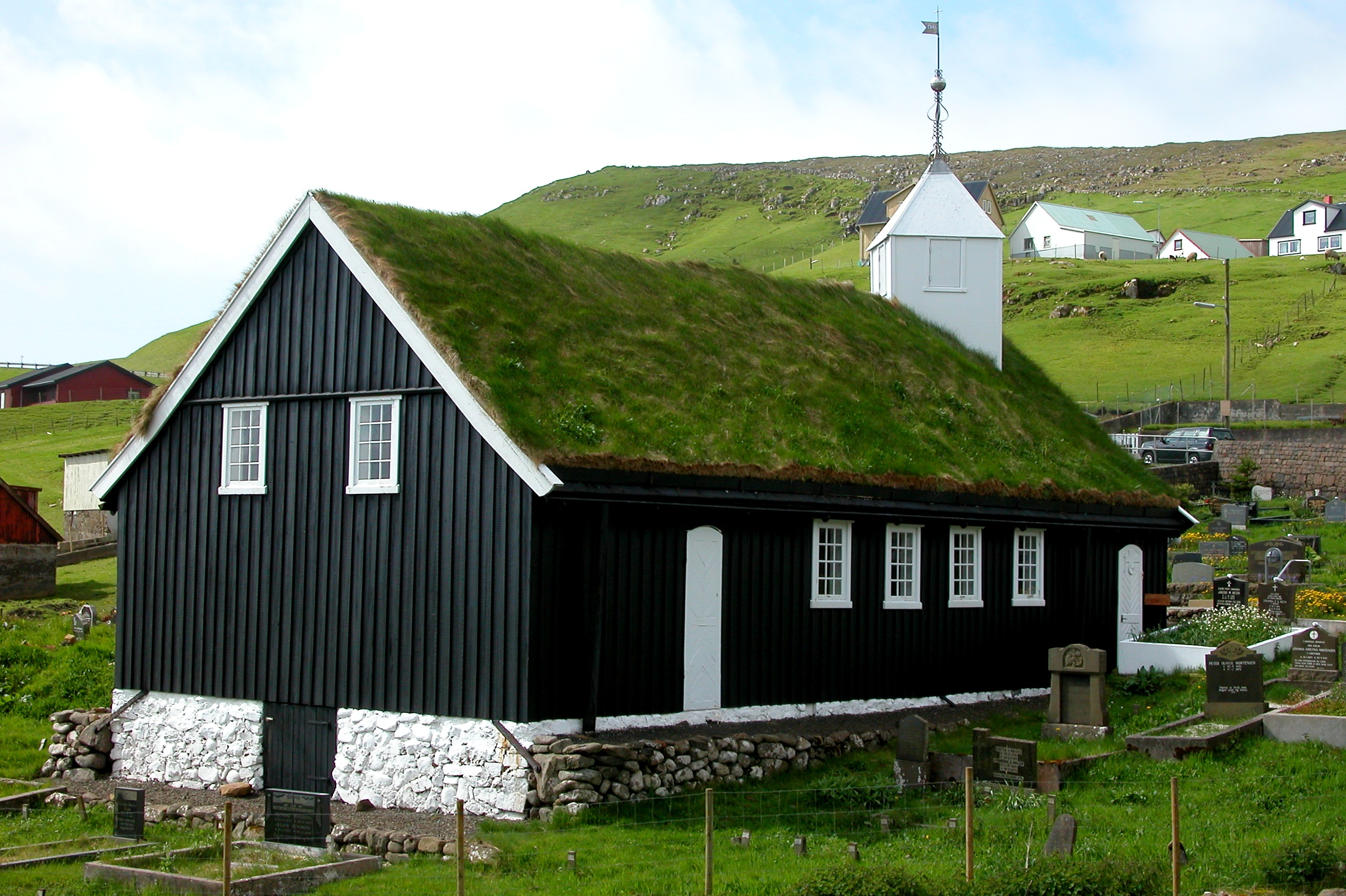
Porkeri Church, showing its turf roof

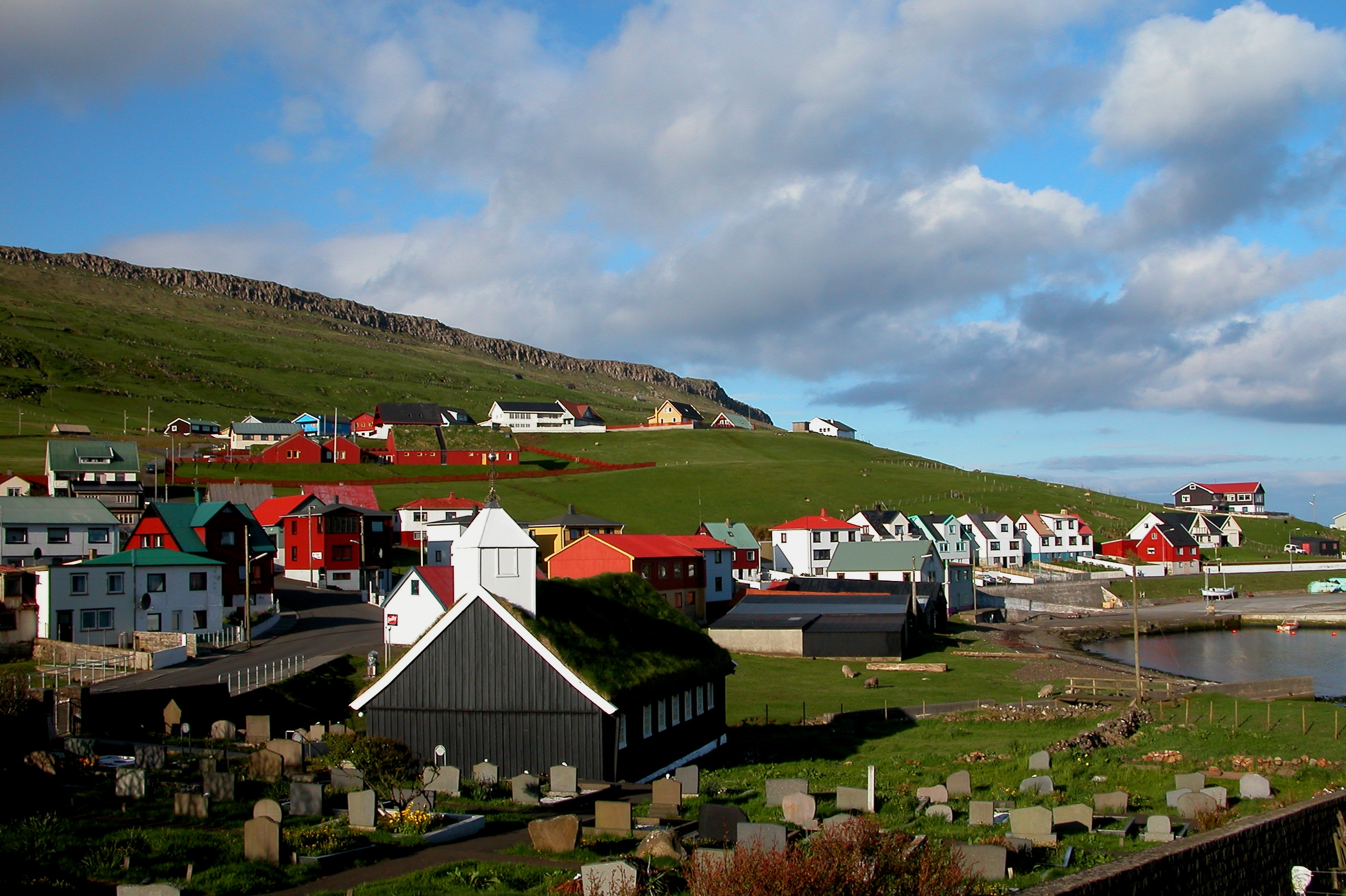
The graveyard at the back of the church

Porkeri Church is a church in the settlement of Porkeri in the Faroe Islands. Porkeri is situated on the island of Suðuroy, which is the southernmost of the islands. It is a wooden church and it has a roof of turf. The church dates from 1847 and contains things donated by seamen who survived lethal storms on the sea, maintaining the tradition of almissu (seamen in danger promised, according to Nordic tradition, to donate to churches or to God if they got back home alive).
