= Sámal Johansen =

Faroese writer and teacher

Sámal Johansen (born 31 October 1899 in Haldórsvík, Faroe Islands, died 11 March 1991) was a Faroese writer and teacher. He was the father of Marita Petersen, the first female prime minister of the Faroe Islands.

In the years 1928 - 1931, Sámal Johansen was editor, together with Samuel Jacob Sesanus Olsen, of the children's magazine Barnablaðið.

Johansen received the Faroese Literature Prize, also known as M.A. Jacobsens Heiðursløn in Faroese, in 1975 for the book 'Á bygd fyrst í tjúgundu øld'.

== Published ==
- 1950 Hylurin in Mín jólabók
- 1957 Jólaaftanskvøld in Mín jólabók
- 1961 Tvey systkin in Mín jólabók
- 1970 Á bygd fyrst í 20. øld (book)
- 1972 Heimbygdin og aðrar søgur (book, the title means: My hometown and other stories)
- 1980 Til lands in Mín jólabók ("Mín jólabók" means "My Christmas book". It contains short stories, poems etc. and is published every year shortly before Christmas in November/December by "Bókadeild Føroya Lærarafelags", the publishing house of the Faroese Teachers' Association.)
