= Church of Tvoroyri =

National church in Tvøroyri, Faroe Islands

Coordinates: 61.5539°N 6.8010°W

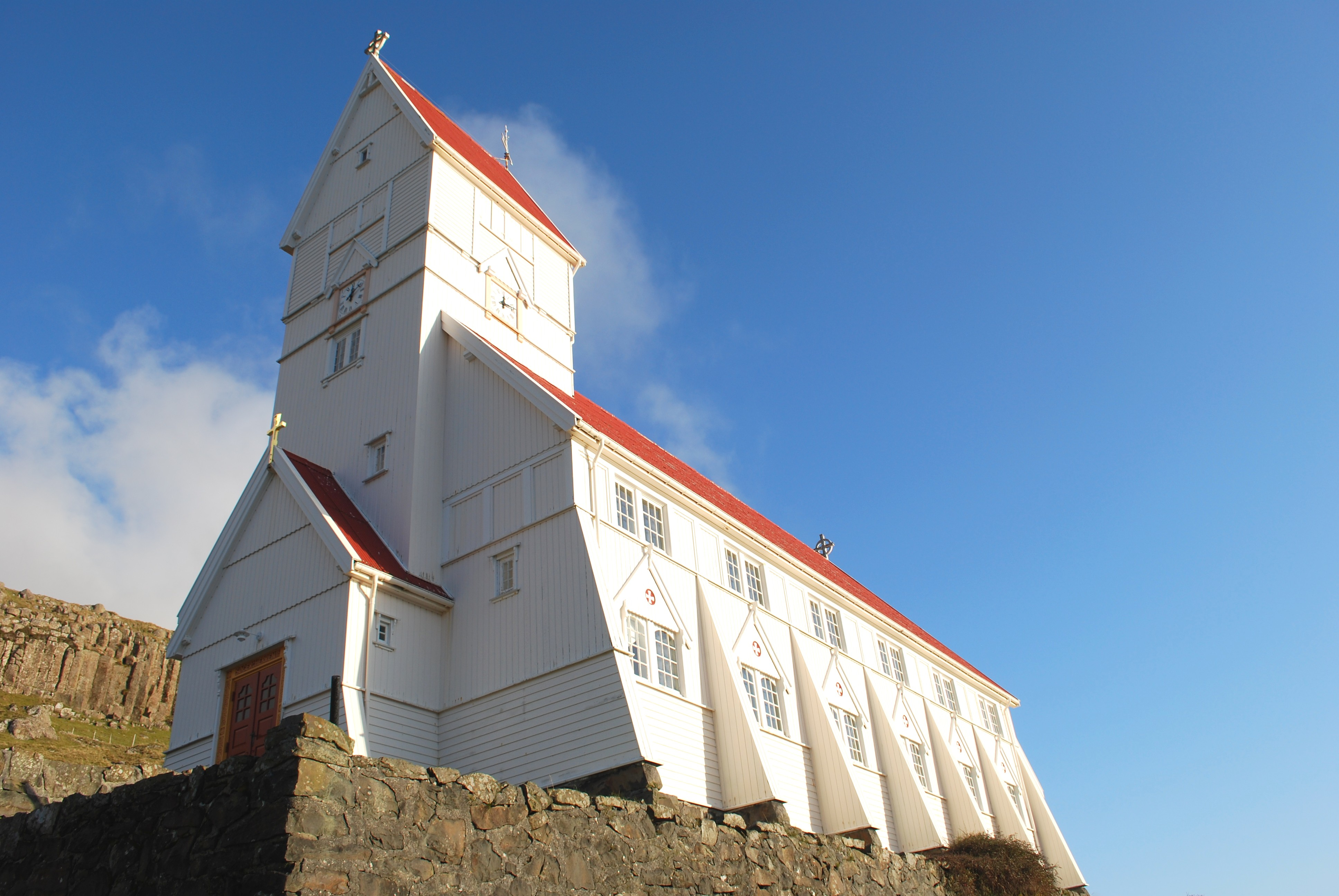
The Church of Tvoroyri. The native name of the church is Tvøroyrar Kirkja.

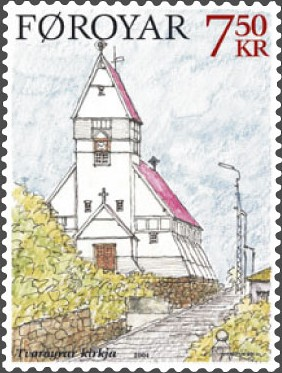
Christmas Stamp of the Faroe Islands (FO 504) which illustrates the Church of Tvoroyri. Artist: Jákup Pauli Gregoriussen

Church of Tvoroyri is a national church in Tvøroyri, Faroe Islands. It was constructed in Norway as a building set, moved to Tvøroyri and then built there in 1908.

== History of the churches of Tvøroyri ==
Earlier, there had been another church in Tvøroyri, which was first built in 1840 in the neighbour village Froðba, which is a few kilometers east of Tvøroyri. Very few people lived in Tvøroyri at that time, but it started to grow fast as the fishing fleet of Tvøroyri grew and the monopoly shop opened there. In 1856 the church in Froðba was taken down and moved to the new settlement of Tvøroyri in the center of town; the latter which is called Valurin and named after Kirkwall of Orkney Islands. The population of Tvøroyri increased and they needed more church capacity. When they built the new church in 1908, the old church was moved, this time it was moved to Sandvík, the northernmost village of the island Suðuroy, and it is still there. In 2008 they celebrated the 100 anniversary of the church, that is 100 years since it was built in Sandvík, but its history goes back to Tvøroyri and Froðba.
