= Porkeri =

Porkeri Porkere (Danish)
- Municipality and village
- Porkeri Municipality; Porkeris kommuna (Faroese)
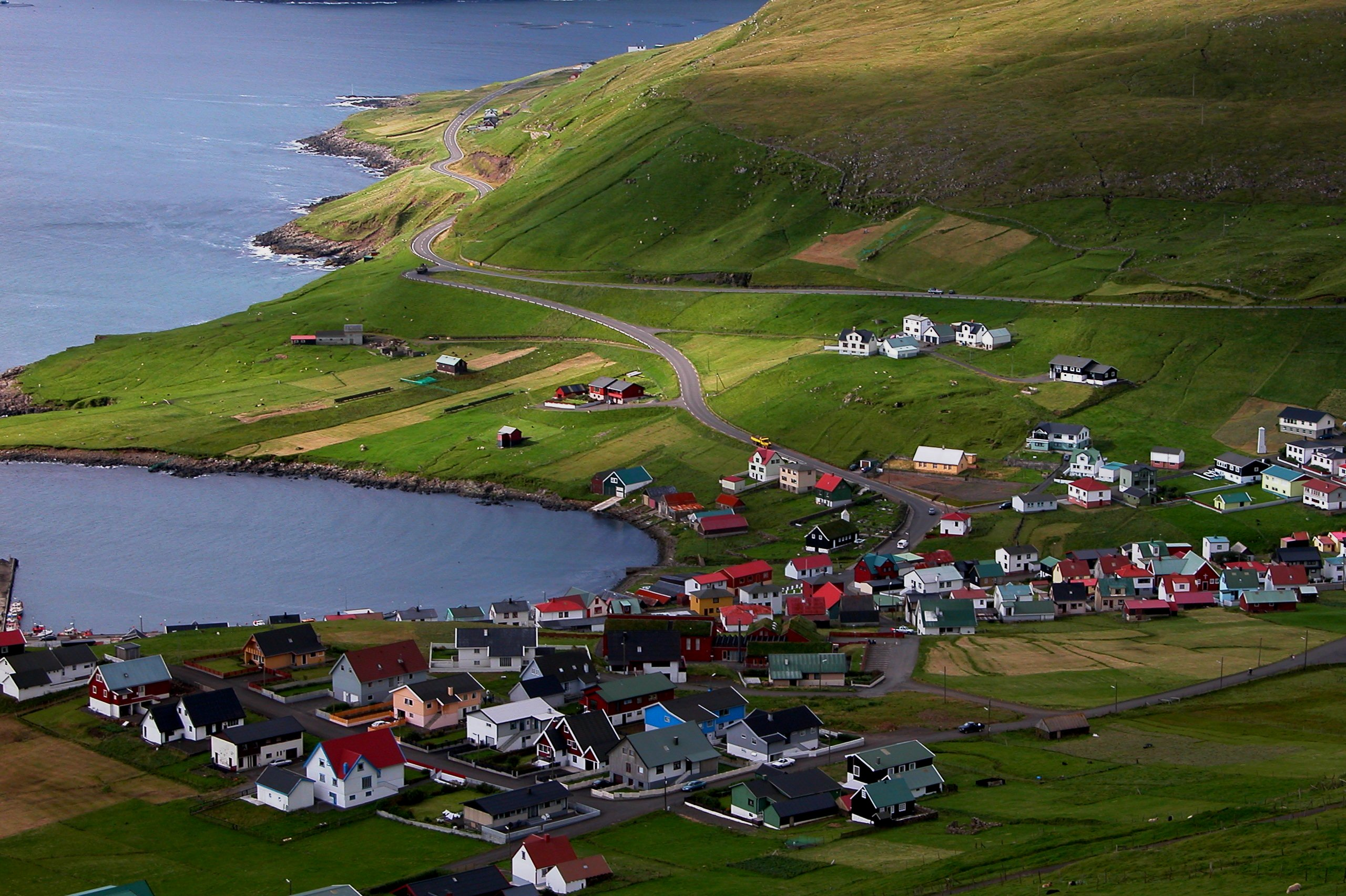
- Porkeri panorama

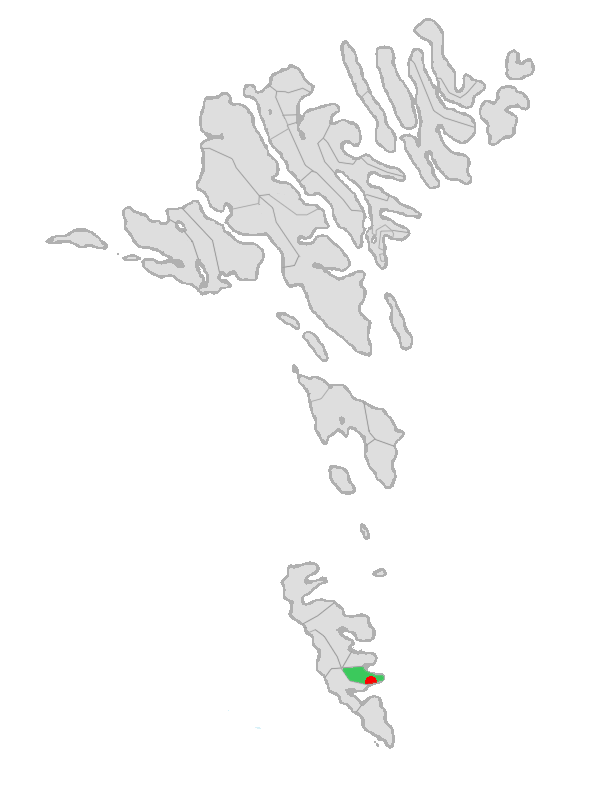
- Location of Porkeris kommuna in the Faroe Islands

- Location of Porkeri village in the Faroe Islands
- Coordinates: 61°28′59″N 6°44′36″W
- State: Kingdom of Denmark
- Constituent country: Faroe Islands
- Island: Suðuroy

Population (September 2025)
  - Total: 326
- Time zone: GMT
  - Summer (DST): UTC+1 (WEST)
- Climate: Cfc
- Website: http://www.porkeri.fo/index.htm

Porkeri (Danish: Porkere) is a village in the Faroe Islands, situated northeast of Vágur on Suðuroy's east coast.

As of 2020 it had a population of 318, and it has been inhabited at least as early as the 14th century.

== History ==
Tradition says that once in the old days a dispute of field boundaries between Porkeri and the neighbouring village Hov was sorted out by a walking-race between one man from each village.

Near the school is a memorial of people who lost their lives at sea. The name of the dead are written with white letters on stone plates on the small piles which stand around the large pile in the middle. On the first stone starting from the left side of the memorial, near the road: 5 names, the first one was Joen Joensen á Gaddi, who was lost with the vessel Royndin Fríða in 1808 together with the famous Faroese hero Nólsoyar Páll (who is not mentioned here because he was not from Porkeri). Joen is the Danish form of the Faroese name Jógvan. In the 19th century and earlier peoples names were written in the Danish form. The second stone has 6 names. The third stone has 5 names. The fourth stone has 6 names. The fifth stone has 6 names (all 6 went drowned in 1910 with North Star (Norðstjørnan). The 6th stone has 5 names The 7th stone has 5 names. The 8th stone has 5 names (died from 1932 to 1938). The 9th stone has 8 names (all died in one boat accident in 1940 with Búgvin, age 17-44) The 10th stone has 6 names (died in 1941 and 1944) The 11th stone has 5 names (died in 1952 and 1953) The 12th stone has 3 names (died in 1956, 59 and 61) All together 65 names of men from Porkeri who lost their lives at sea (a few died on land by falling down from a cliff or due to the World War II).

== Facilities ==
Porkeri Church is a black and white wooden church with grass roof. The church dates from 1847 and contains things donated by seamen who survived lethal storms on the sea, maintaining the tradition of almissu (seamen in danger promised, according to Nordic tradition, to donate to churches or to God if they got back home alive).

In 1984 a new school was built in the village. It is built in a modern Faroese style and has grass on the roof. The old school in Porkeri was built in 1888. It was used as such for 96 years. It is now owned by "Porkeris Bygdasavn". There are many interesting historical items, which tell the maritime history and the agricultural as well as the domestic history of the village and its people.

== Tourism ==
There is a street with similar houses, but with different colors. The street is called Skiparavegur, which means Skippers Street or Captains Street.

Visit the Church and Museum of Porkeri. An interesting little museum with items from daily life in Porkeri, agricultural and maritime history. The Museum of Porkeri (Porkeris Bygdarsavn), (Near the church), ☎ +298 373850,

If you don't come by car, you can take bus line 700 from Krambatangi port, where the ferry Smyril arrives from Tórshavn, and tell the driver where you want to go to and ask him to tell you when you are in Porkeri. If you come to Suðuroy by car, you should turn left at the main road, drive towards strait south, you will drive through a little village, which is called Øravík, than you come to a road tunnel and after that you pass by Hov, which is also a little village. After Hov you will drive above Porkeri.

== Gallery ==
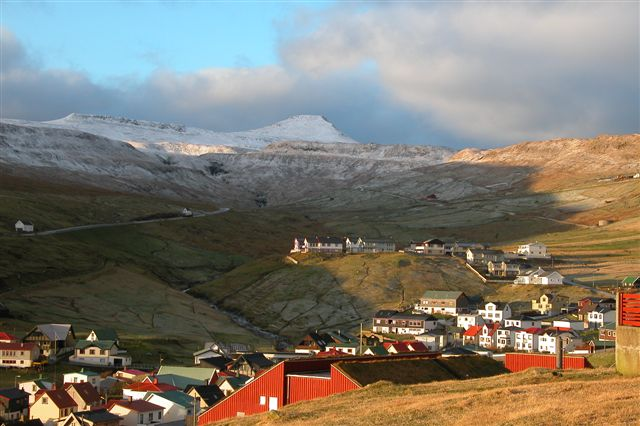
Porkeri mountains

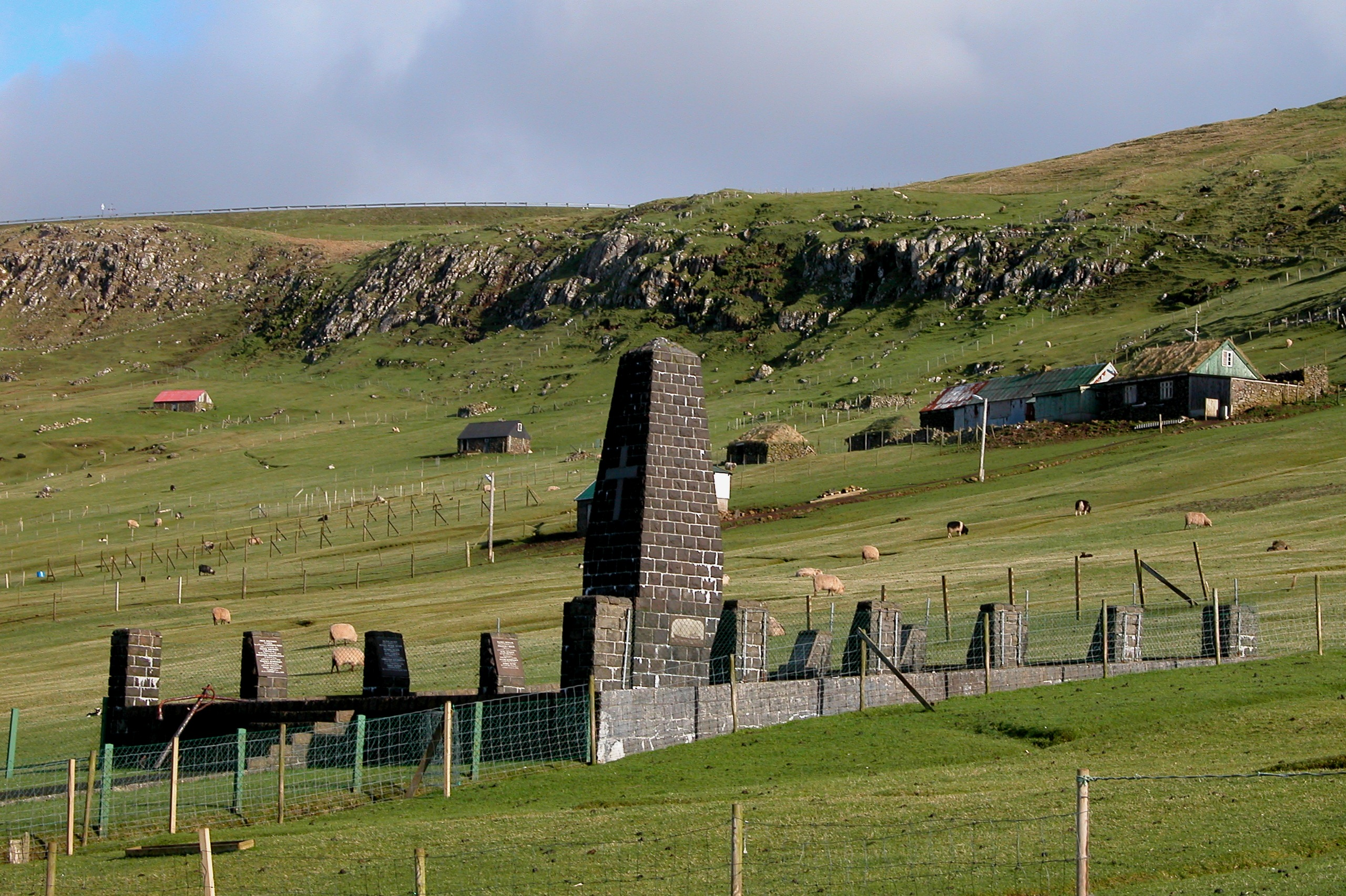
Near the school is a memorial of people who lost their lives at sea

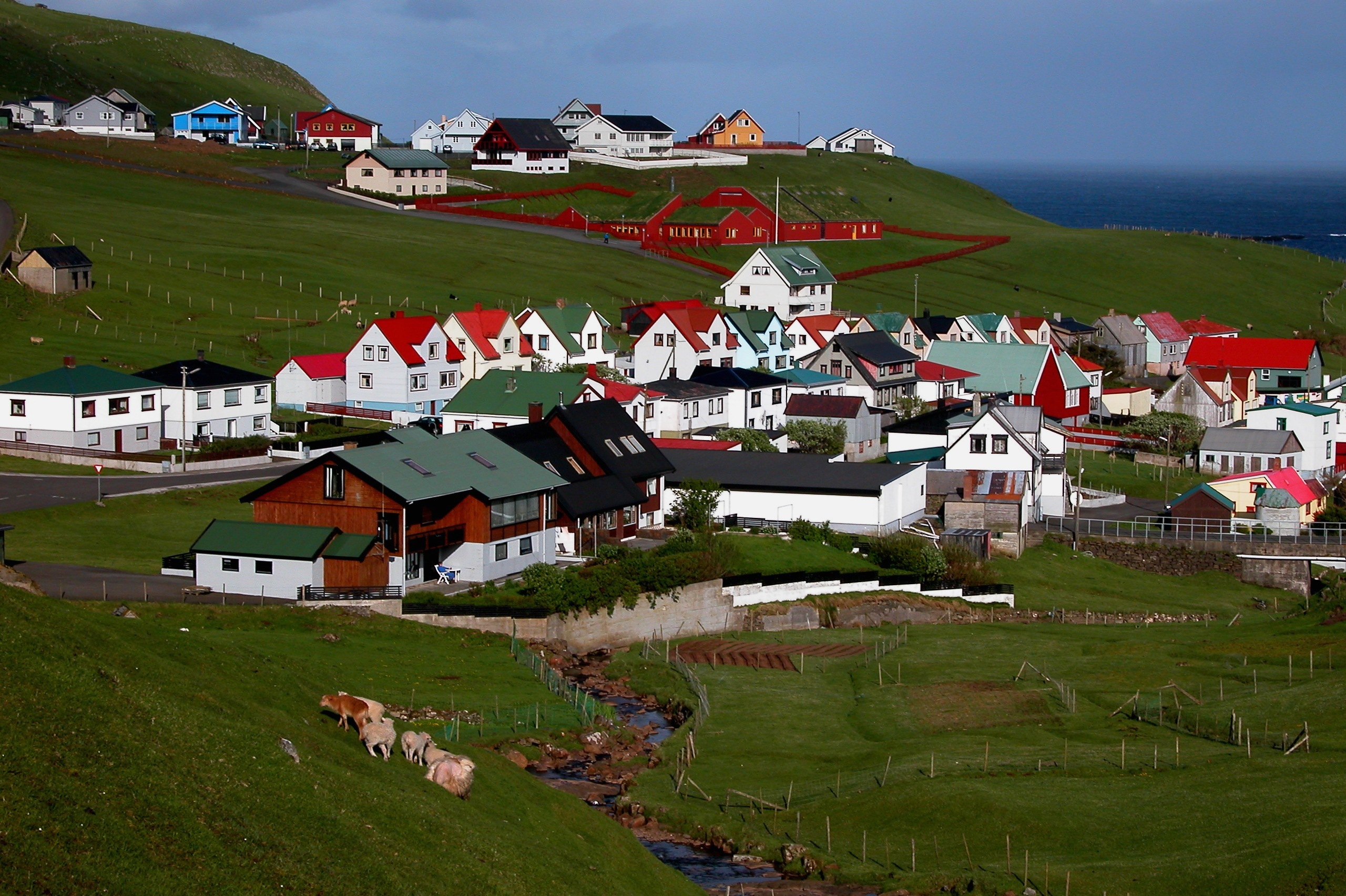
Porkeri

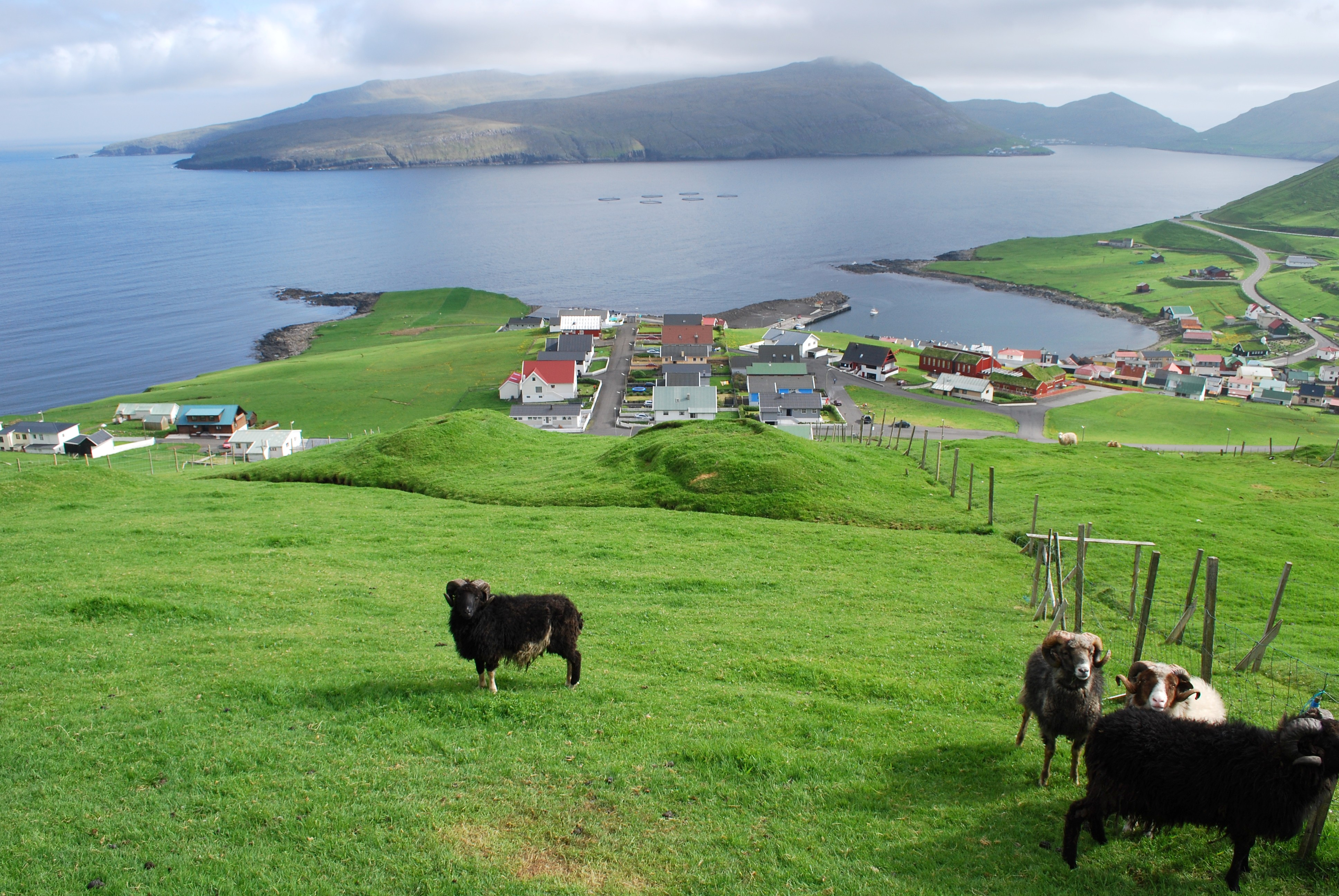
Porkeri

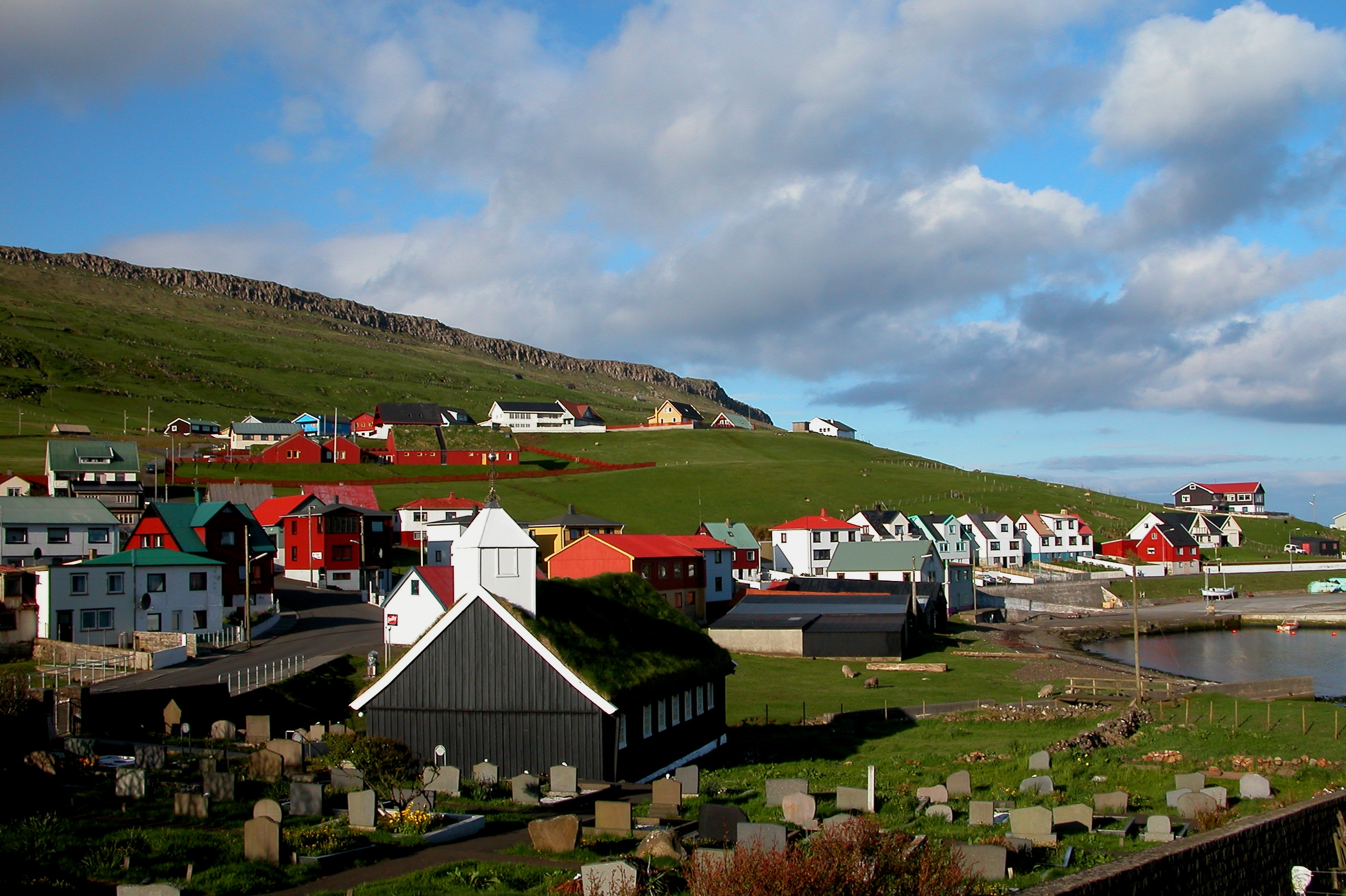
The Graveyard

== See also ==
- List of towns in the Faroe Islands
