= Øravík =

- Village
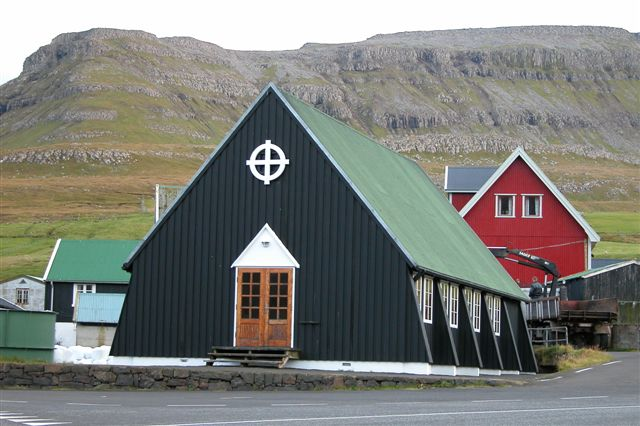
- Øravík Church, in Faroese it is called Bønhúsið í Øravík (House of Prayers)

- Location in the Faroe Islands
- Coordinates: 61°32′10″N 6°48′31″W
- State: Kingdom of Denmark
- Constituent country: Faroe Islands
- Island: Suðuroy
- Municipality: Tvøroyrar kommuna

Population (1 January 2009)
  - Total: 42
- Time zone: GMT
  - Summer (DST): UTC+1 (EST)
- Postal code: FO 827
- Climate: Cfc

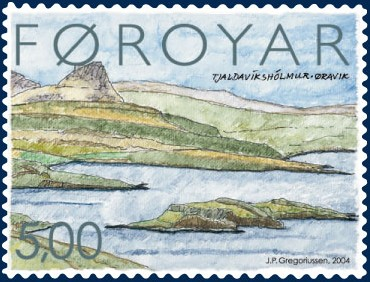
Øravík on Suðuroy, Faroe Islands Stamp FO 468 of the Faroe Islands Artist: Jákup Pauli Gregoriussen Issued: 26 January 2004

Øravík (also spelled Ørðavík, Danish: Ørdevig) is a village on the east coast of the island of Suðuroy in the Faroe Islands.

The village is located in the center of the island on a crossroad where the road to Fámjin goes towards west over the mountains to the west coast. One part of the village is located in the bay of Øravík, the other part is 3 km further north near the ferry port Krambatangi. The northern part of Øravík and the southern part of Trongisvágur have grown together. Øravík is one of the few places in Suðuroy which still has cattle. Besides from that there are other domestic animals like sheep and geese. There is a small harbour in Øravík and some boat houses.

== Varðagøtur ==
Just south of Øravík up in the mountains is a place called Mannaskarð, where the old walking paths from five villages meet, these paths are called varðagøtur in Faroese, named after "varðar", which means cairn. These are all around the island between the villages and other places, so people could find their way in the old days, before the roads for cars were made. On Mannaskarð the paths from Øravík, Fámjin, Hov, Porkeri and Vágur meet. Sometimes hiking trips are arranged along these old paths.

== Folklore ==
Øravík is mentioned in Suduroy Saga (Suðuroyar Sagnir) several times, i.e. in the story about Vísa Marjun (Wise Marion). One of the stories about her tell about how she scared away the pirates who ravaged at that time. They embarked in Hvalba and wanted to go to all of the island to steal what they could find. People escaped up in the mountains to hide in caves there, but Wise Marion was not scared, she stood and waited for them and sent a mentally challenged boy towards them. According to the story the pirates got scared that she may put a spell on them, so they turned around and went back to Hvalba. The pirates were called Turks, but they came from Algier in North Africa, which was a part of the Ottoman Empire.

== The road and the tunnel between Øravík and Hov ==
In 1943 work started to make a road between Øravík and Hov. However, very little progress was made as only a few men were working on the road. They made the road from Øravík to Trøllavík (near Tjaldavík), but stopped in 1953. The work had also started on the other side of the mountains, in Hov, but there too they made little progress, and when the work there also stopped in 1953 they had only made it a short way from the village. Three years later they started to work again on both sides of the Øravík-Hov road. This time they were around 70 men on the northern side and around 60 men on the southern side. On 1 October 1958 the road was finally opened.

49 years after the opening of the road between Øravík and Hov, which was a very big progress back then, a tunnel was opened between the same two villages. The tunnel, Hovstunnilin, was opened on 20 October 2007.

== Data ==
Population: 42 in Øravík and 70 in Øravíkarlíð

== Gallery ==
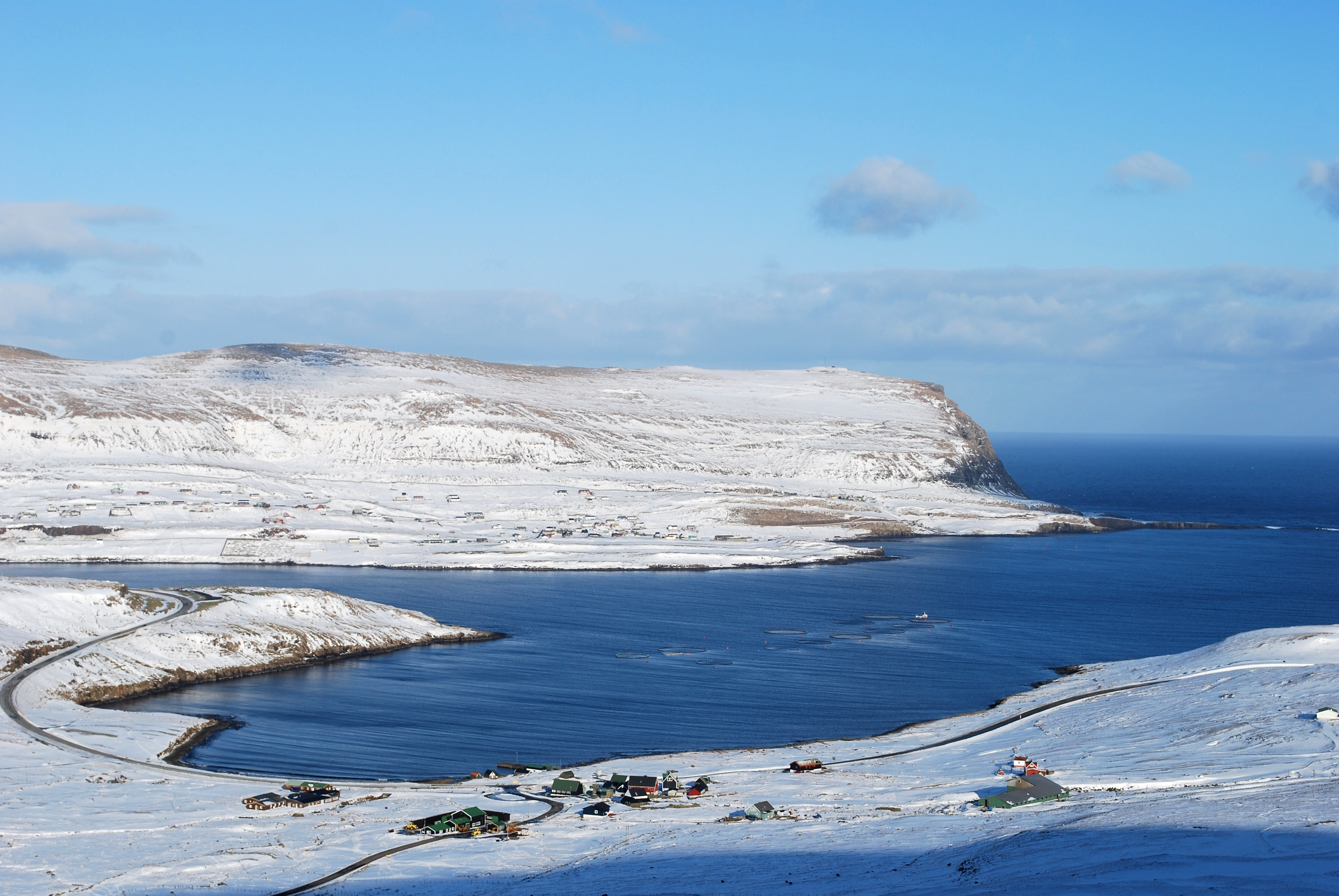
Øravík in snow on 28 February 2010. Froðba is on the other side of Trongisvágsfjørður.

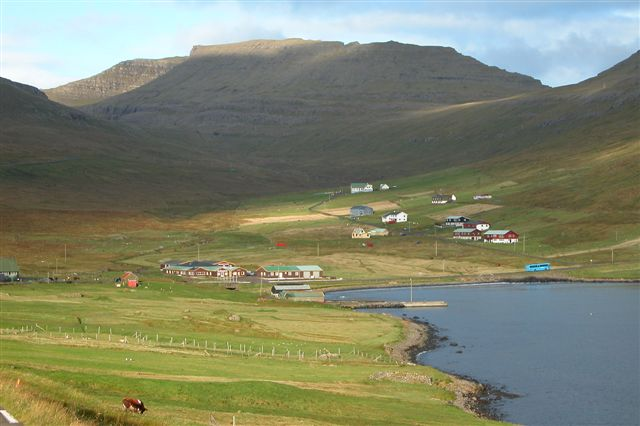
Øravík in May 2002. Hotel Øravík is located in the brown buildings in the center of the photo.

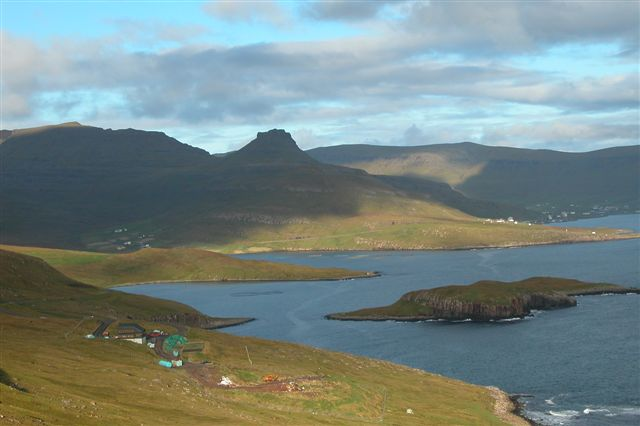
View over the bay of Tjaldavík, Øravík and Trongisvágur. A part of Øravík is visible just below the mountain Oyrnafjall.

== See also ==
- List of towns in the Faroe Islands
- Suðuroy
