= Trongisvágur =

- Village
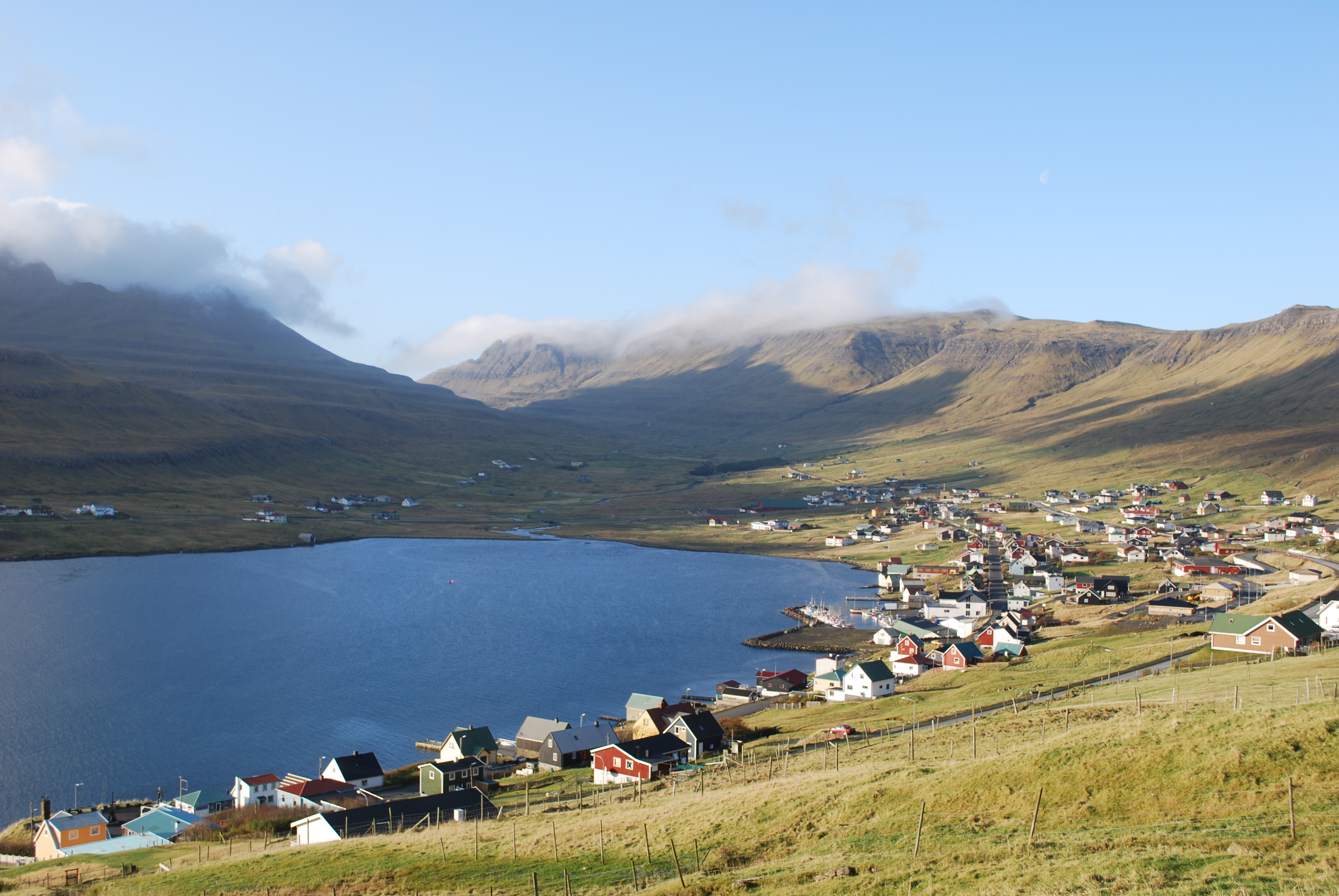
- Trongisvágur, seen from Tvøroyri. The fjord is Trongisvágsfjørður

- Location in the Faroe Islands
- Coordinates: 61°33′50″N 6°50′40″W
- State: Kingdom of Denmark
- Constituent country: Faroe Islands
- Island: Suðuroy
- Municipality: Tvøroyri Municipality

Population (September 2024)
  - Total: 524
- Time zone: GMT
  - Summer (DST): UTC+1 (EST)
- Postal code: FO 826
- Climate: Cfc

Trongisvágur (Danish: Trangisvåg) is a village on the island of Suduroy in the Faroe Islands.

Trongisvágur is the village in the bottom of Trongisvágsfjørður (fjord) on the east coast of Suduroy. Trongisvágur and the neighbouring villages of Tvøroyri and Øravík have grown into one entity (the northern part of Øravík, which is called Øravíkarlíð, is where the ferry port Krambatangi is). A river called Stórá that runs through the valley passes through a plantation that is worth visiting on a good day, and then flows into the inlet at a nearby beach. There is a debate whether the name Trong is Norse or Gaelic in origin. Another version of the name is Trungisvágur. Trungisvágsbotnur is on the west coast, west of Trongisvágur. There are binoculars there in summertime, so people can have a closer look at birds and the vertical cliffs there. The place is called Á Røðini, but some people call it Kikarin, because of the binoculars. Shortly after the Park of Trongisvágur is the tunnel to Hvalba, the Hvalbiartunnilin, which was the first road tunnel in the Faroe Islands. It was dug in 1963 and is 1450 metres long. In 2019 the boring of a replacement tunnel commenced; the new tunnel was opened in 2021, whereupon the old one was closed. The highest mountain in Suðuroy, Gluggarnir, is in the south of Trongisvágur; it is 610 metres high.

== Sports Hall and Football Stadium ==
In Trongisvágur, there is a sports hall, a school and a kindergarten. On 17 November 2011 they started to build a new football stadium for TB Tvøroyri west of the sports hall. In April 2012 the football field was named Fótbóltsvøllurin við Stórá (Stórá means large or grand river, there is a river nearby with the name Stórá, hence The Football Stadium við Stórá. In English it would probably be Grand River Stadium). Earlier they had considered other names for the football stadium, the two other names which they considered were old place names from that area: Í Stópunum and Undir Brekkum. Finally they chose the name Við Stórá.

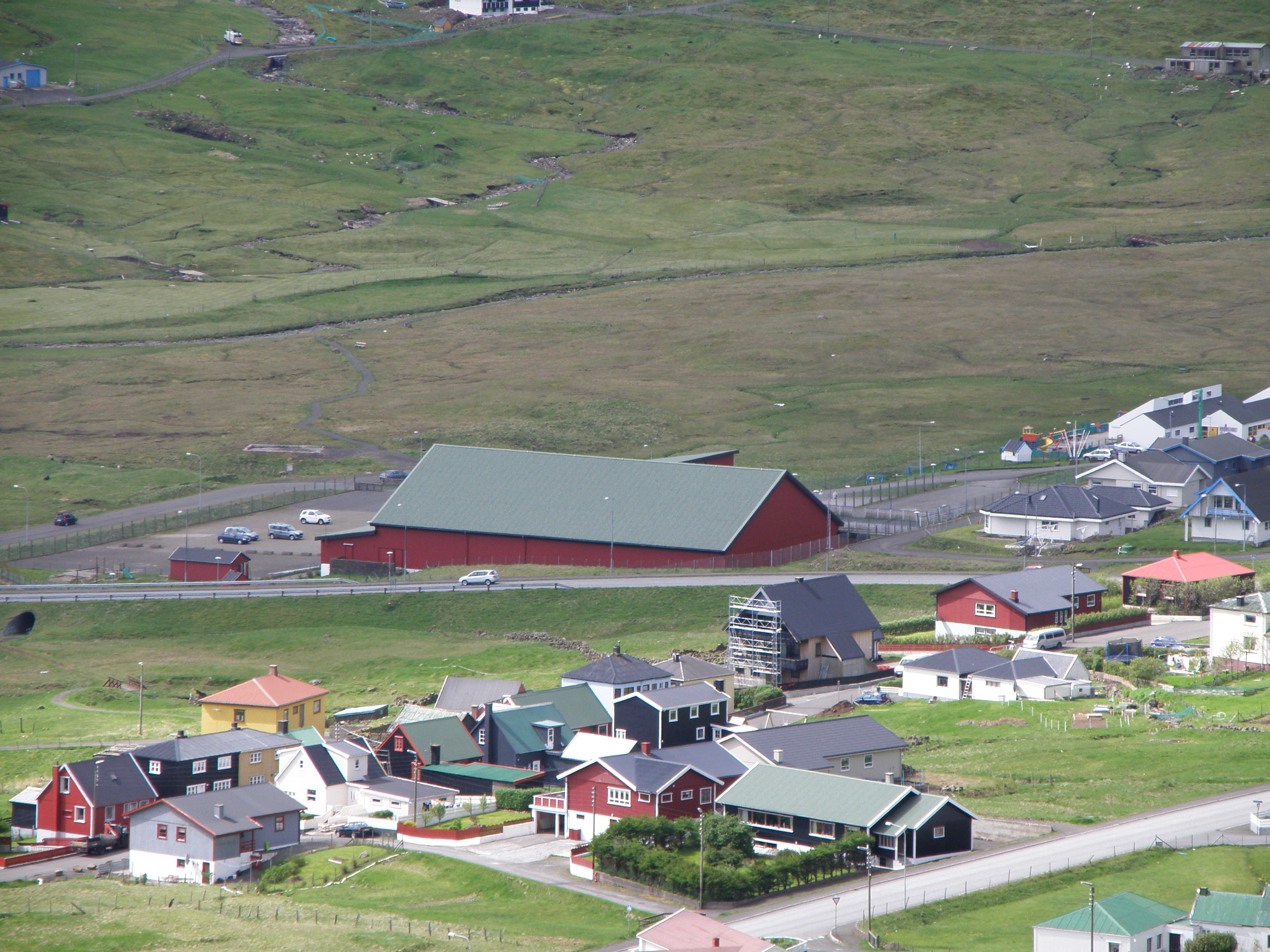
The sports hall in Trongisvágur. This photo is from 2010. In November 2011 they started to build a new football stadium for TB Tvøroyri in the area between the sports hall and the river.

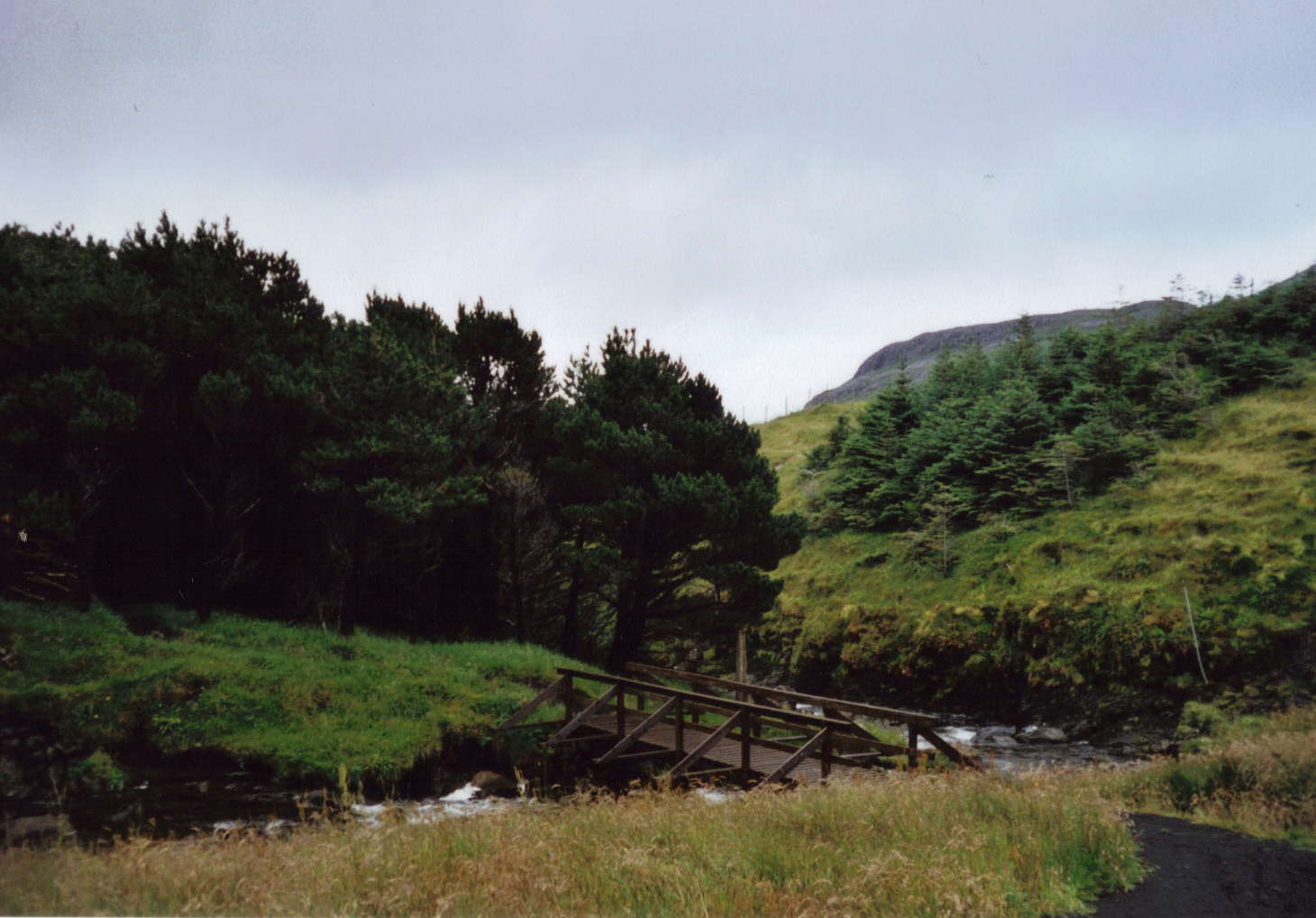
The Park of Trongisvágur (Viðalundin í Trongisvági) is located next to the road to Hvalba.

== Notable people ==
Notable people that were born or lived in Trongisvágur include:

- Heðin Mortensen (born 1946), politician

== See also ==
- List of towns in the Faroe Islands
