= Tvøroyri =

- Village
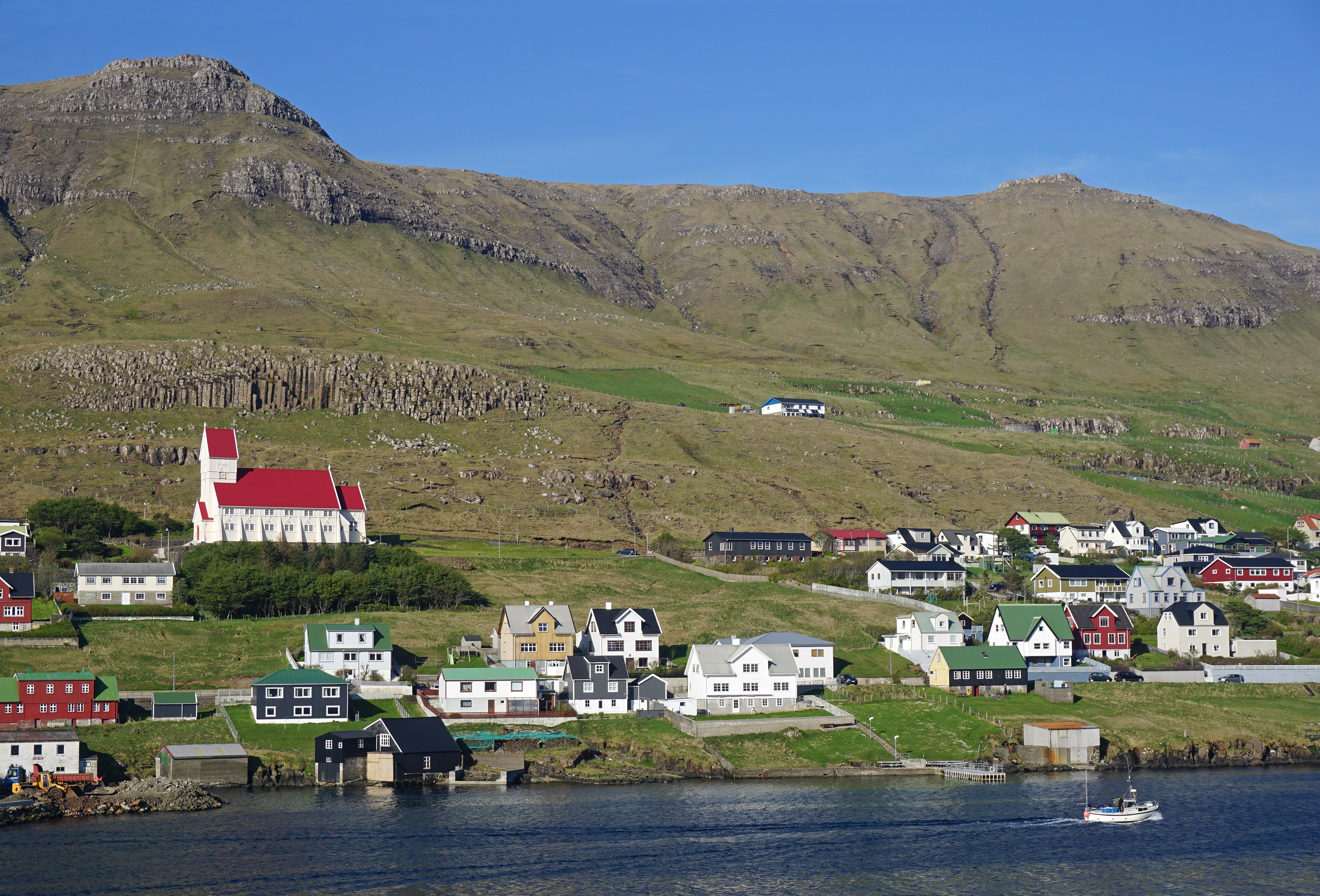
- Tvøroyri seen from MS Smyril, with the church of Tvøroyri at left.

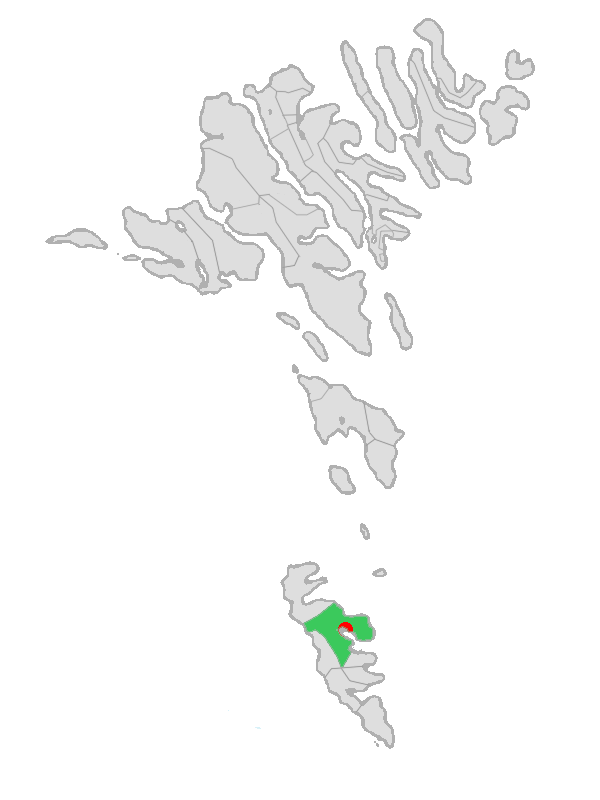
- Location of Tvøroyri within Tvøroyri Municipality in the Faroe Islands

- Location of Tvøroyri village in the Faroe Islands
- Coordinates: 61°33′21″N 06°48′12″W
- State: Kingdom of Denmark
- Constituent country: Faroe Islands
- Island: Suðuroy
- Municipality: Tvøroyri Municipality

Government
  - Mayor: Kristin Michelsen

Population (September 2025)
  - Total: 864
- Postal code: FO 800
- Climate: Cfc
- Website: Official home page

Tvøroyri is a village on the north side of the Trongisvágsfjørður on the east coast of Suðuroy island in the Faroe Islands. Together with Froðba, Trongisvágur, Líðin and Øravík it forms Tvøroyri Municipality.

The village is considered to have been founded in 1836, when the Royal Danish Monopoly Trade Store was founded on a small tongue of land, called Tvøroyri. In a short span of years, Tvøroyri grew into a large village, mainly after 1856 when the monopoly state of the store was abolished. Around the turn of the 20th century, Tvøroyri was one of the largest towns on the Faroe Islands and had one of the main fishing industries.

== Overview ==
The church in Tvøroyri was constructed in Norway as a building set, moved to Tvøroyri and then built here in 1907, ready to use in 1908. The old church was moved to Sandvík.

=== Trongisvágur ===
Trongisvágur is the village furthest to the west of the inlet of Trongisvágsfjørður. It is home to a large sports centre, children's institutions and the football stadium "Stórá". Stórá is the home of Tvøroyrar Bóltfelag (TB), the oldest football team of the Faroe Islands. TB was founded in 1892; the second oldest team was founded in 1904.

=== Froðba ===
The other neighbouring village is called Froðba. It is further east on the north side of the fjord, on the same side as Tvøroyri. Froðba has columnar basalt along the road. The poet Poul F. Joensen had his home in Froðba – there is a monument there to honour him. Froðba and Trongisvágur are older villages than Tvøroyri.

== History ==
When the monopoly was abolished in 1856, private companies were founded on Tvøroyri. One of these grew into the largest in the Faroe Islands. It had 20 branches and 30 ships. Down by the harbour, north of Seglloftið, lies a square covered by flat stones. Fish used to be dried in the sun here. The Royal Trade Monopoly that had a branch here from 1836 to 1856 built the old houses in the area. The village of Tvøroyri was actually founded due to this branch. Tvøroyri has a large fillet-factory that initiated its production in 1975.

== Transport ==
The ferry Smyril M/F sails to Tórshavn from Krambatangi ferry port, which is located on the opposite side of the inlet. There are two bus lines in Suðuroy, one serving the southern part of the island with Sumba as its end station, and the other serving the northern part of the island, with termini in Sandvík, the northernmost village, and Fámjin, which is on the west coast.

== Culture ==
Tvøroyri and Vágur take turns in hosting an annual civic festival called Jóansøka in late June. Tvøroyri has a history and maritime museum and an art gallery.

=== Sports ===
The sports club TB Tvøroyri was founded in 1892 as a football club, the first in the Faroe Islands. The name TB is also used in volleyball. The club was a branch of TB Tvøroyri, but in 2016 it became an independent club with the name TB Flogbóltur. In December 2016 the three football clubs on the island of Suðuroy, TB, FC Suðuroy and Royn, agreed to merge into one club, TB/FC Suðuroy/Royn. After two seasons, the club split once more into three separate teams.

There is a rowing club, Froðbiar Sóknar Róðrarfelag, which was founded in 1934.

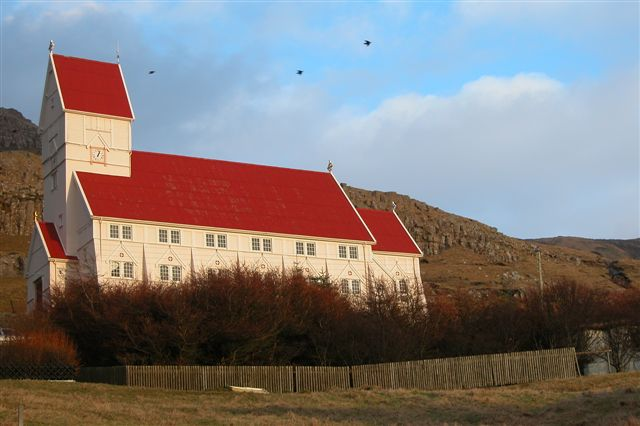
The red-roofed church of Tvøroyri.

== Notable people ==
- Atli Dam, former Faroese prime minister.
- Petur Mohr Dam, former Faroese prime minister.
- Jóannes Eidesgaard, former Faroese prime minister.
- Jacob Haugaard, comedian and Danish former MP.
- Óli Johannesen, former national football player.
- Gilli Rólantsson, footballer

== See also ==
- List of towns in the Faroe Islands
