= Froðba =

- Village
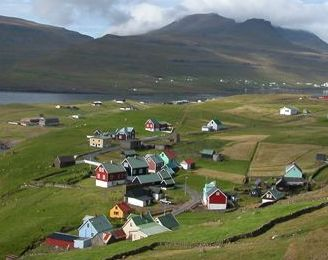
- Froðba

- Location in the Faroe Islands
- Coordinates: 61°32′53″N 6°46′20″W
- State: Kingdom of Denmark
- Country: Faroe Islands
- Island: Suðuroy
- Municipality: Tvøroyrar

Population (September 2025)
  - Total: 255
- Time zone: GMT
  - Summer (DST): UTC+1 (EST)
- Postal code: FO 825
- Climate: Cfc

Froðba (Danish: Frodebø) is a village located furthest out on the north brink of Trongisvágsfjørður, an inlet on the east coast of the island of Suðuroy in the Faroe Islands.

== History ==
The village eventually merged with the harbour city of Tvøroyri. Froðba is usually divided into smaller places such as Hamri, Undir Skorum, Støðlunum, Torvheyggur and Bøur. Bøur is typically referred to as "Úti á Bø" the oldest inhabited area in Froðba, Bøur has a small graveyard which used to be the only one in Trongisvágsfjørður. It is no longer in use and Froðba once had a church which was in Bø, but after Froðba merged with the growing nearby town of Tvøroyri, the small church was moved to Tvøroyri. As the population grew, the church was replaced and moved to Sandvík.

Tradition says that Froðba is the oldest village on Suðuroy and in the Faroe Islands. A legendary Danish king, Frode or Fróði, ran ashore and settled there. The place is named after him. The name Froðba was originally Fróðabæ, in Norse, which means Frode-village or settlement. The name "Fróðabæ" has changed to "Froðabø" and finally "Froðaba" and Froðba; the Faroese word bø translates into place, dwelling, settlement or village in English. The word also has a second meaning, which is field or meadow in English. Note that other villages on Suðuroy share the ending "ba" or "Bæ", "Bø" such as Hvalba and Sumba. The old church in Froðba housed a rune stone which was taken to Denmark in 1823 and cataloged in the Nationalmuseet, but was lost and rediscovered in 2003. Due to some mix up and in cataloguing since its rediscovery, the rune stone's whereabouts are still unknown.

== Heliport ==
There is a heliport near Froðba (at 61°32′37″N 6°46′28″W), the only one with public traffic on Suðuroy. There are helicopter flights to Tórshavn and Vágar Airport.

== Gallery ==
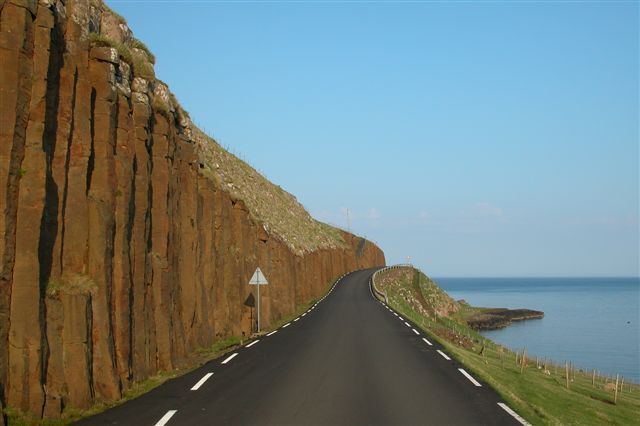
Basalt cliffs

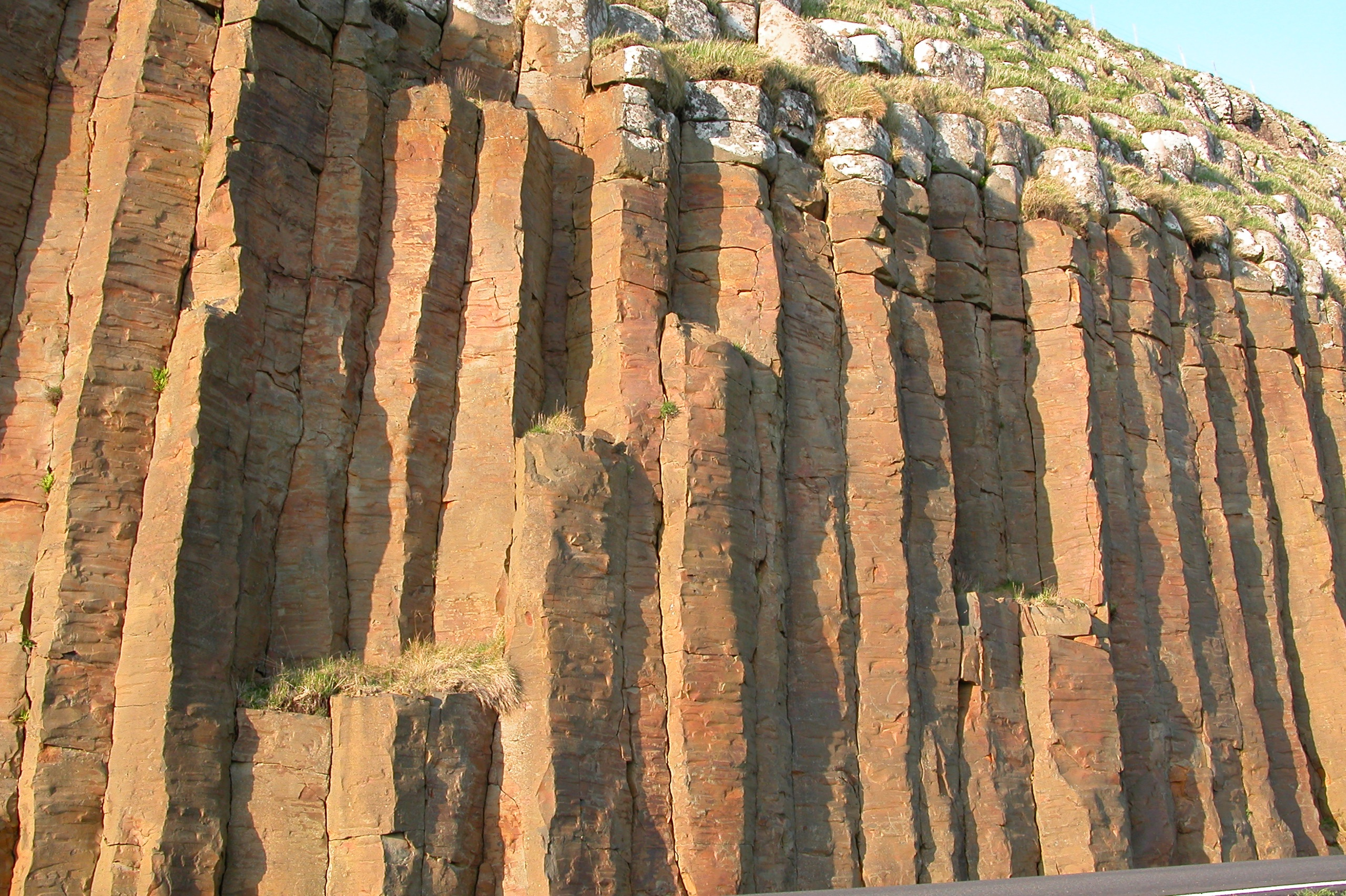
Columnar basalt next to the street Froðbiarvegur

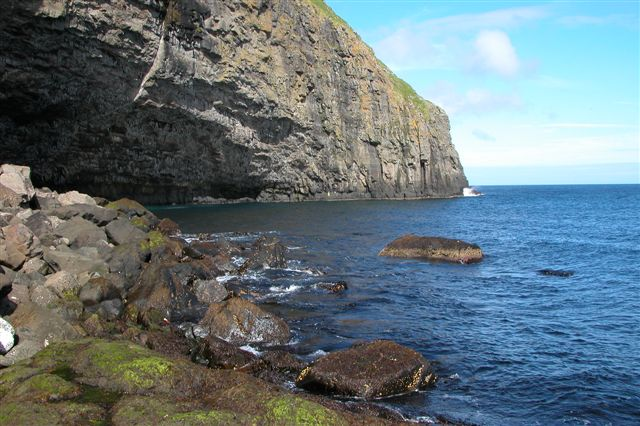
The distinctive cliffs of Hol í Hellu

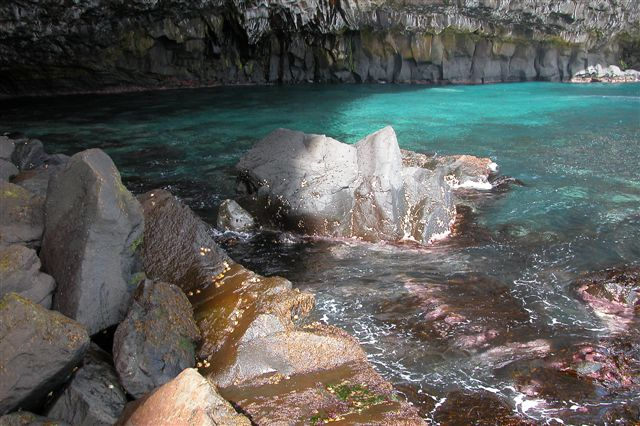
Hol í Hellu a cave east of Froðba.

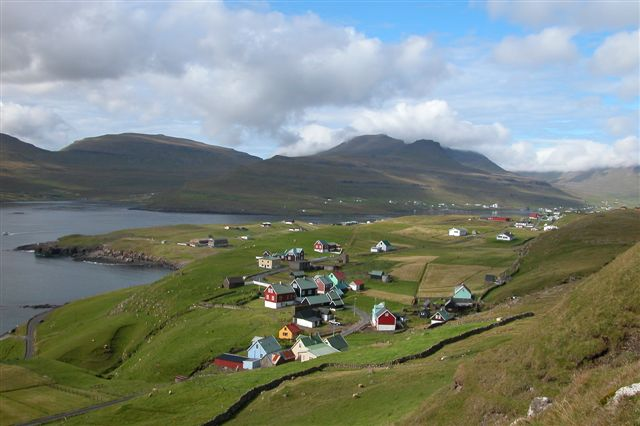
View of Froðba

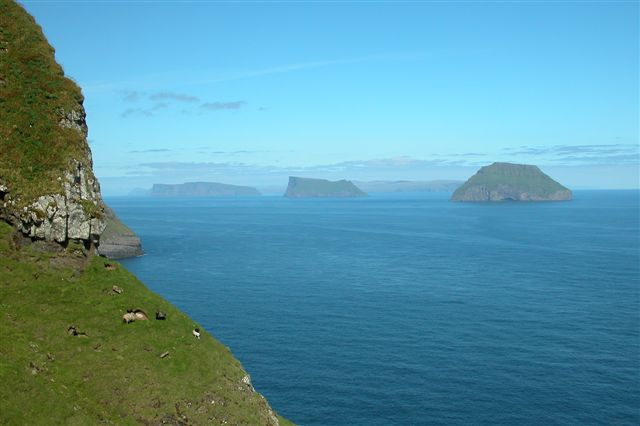
View from Froðbiarnípa to the small islands Lítla Dímun, Stóra Dímun and Skúvoy.

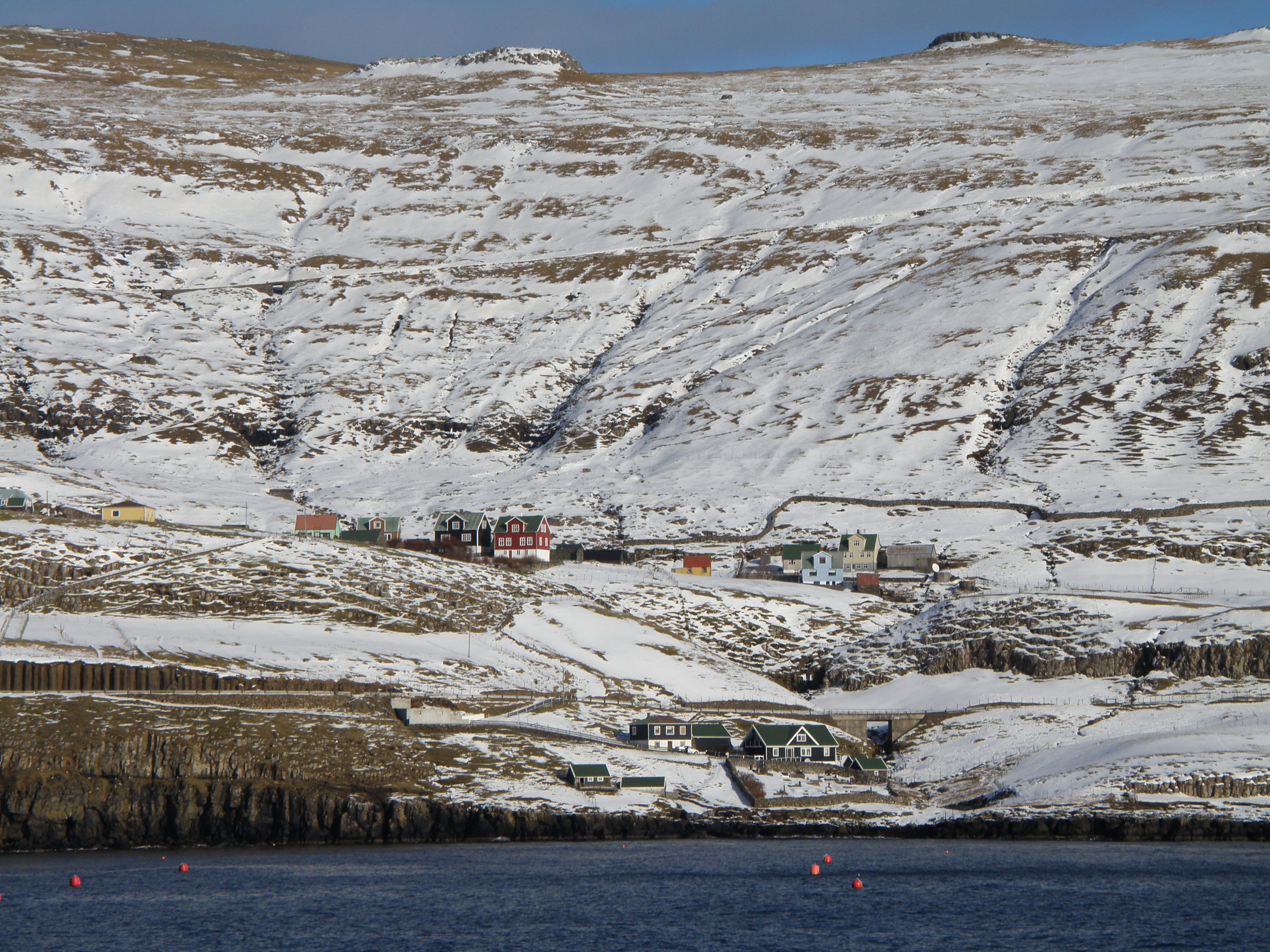
View of Froðba from the ferry Smyril

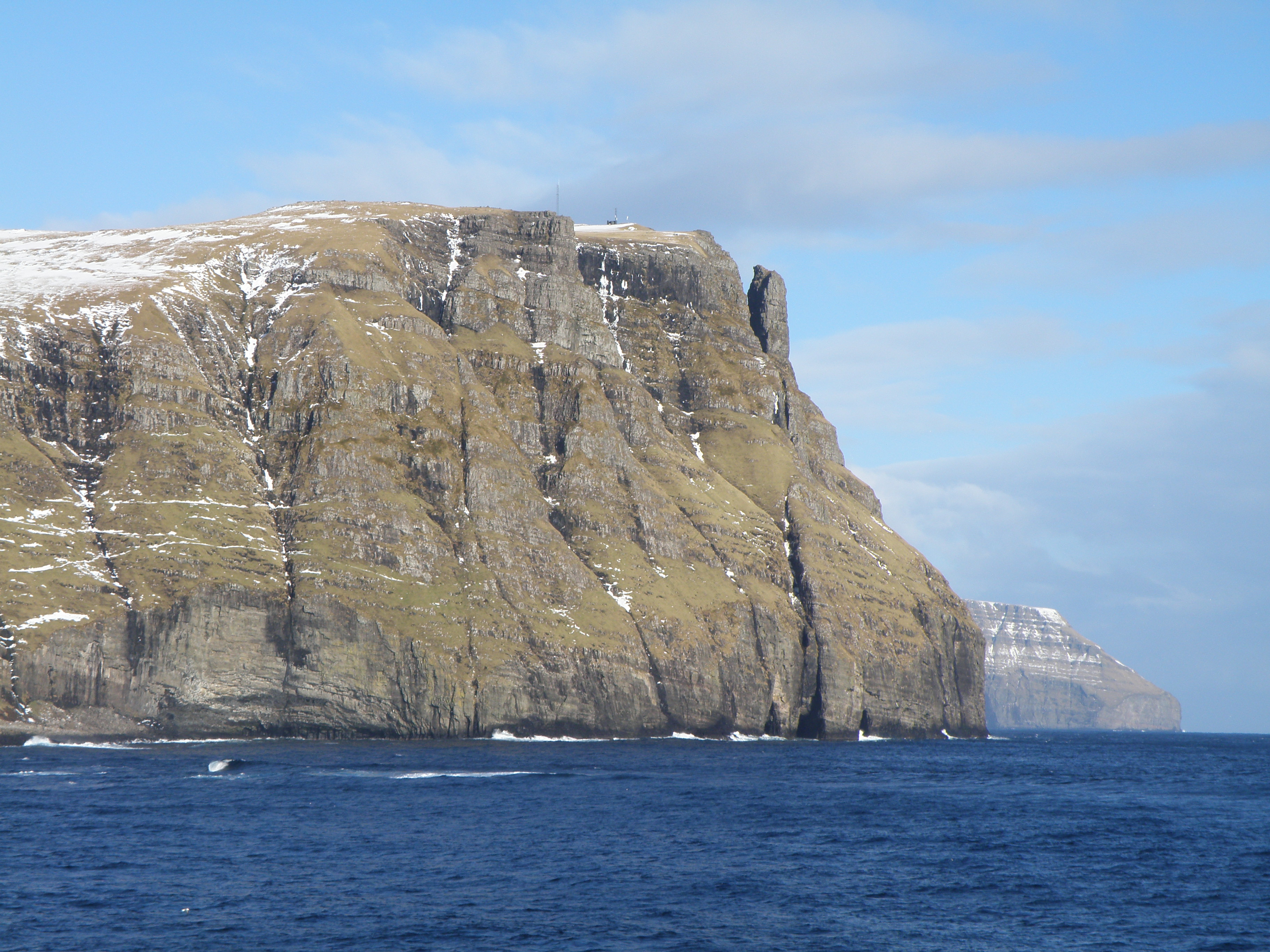
Froðbiarnípa, view from Smyril

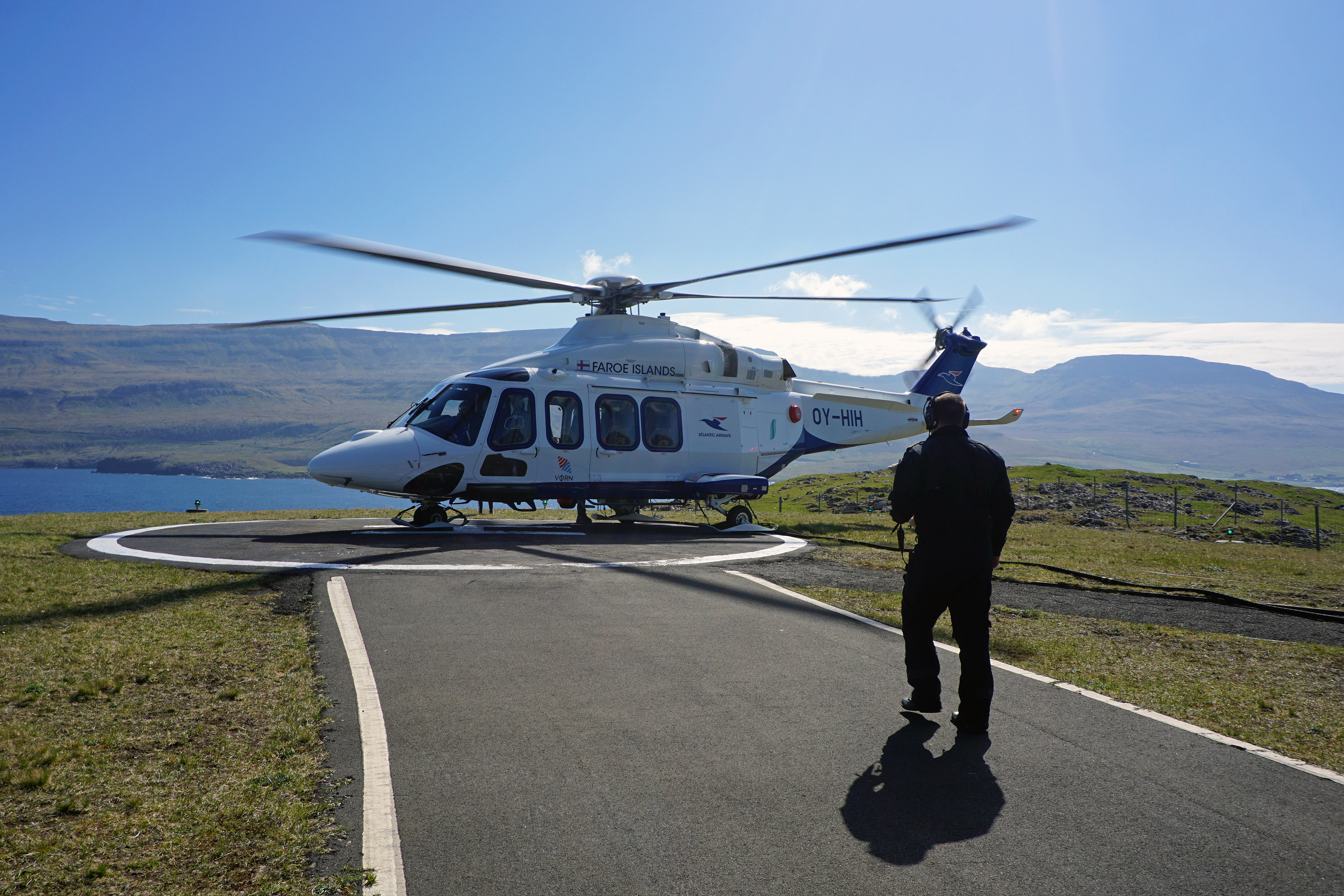
Atlantic Airways AgustaWestland AW139 OY-HIH at Froðba helicopter station.

== See also ==
- List of towns in the Faroe Islands
