= Borgarknappur =

Mountain on the island of Suðuroy, Faroe Islands

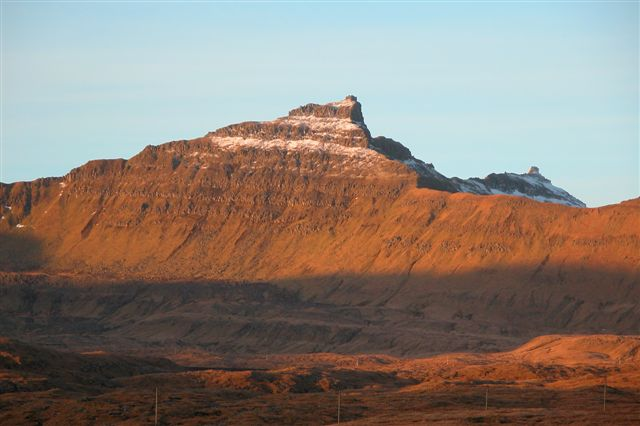
- Borgarknappur as seen from Hov

Highest point
- Elevation: 574 m (1,883 ft)
- Coordinates: 61.5°N 6.833333°W

Geography
- Location within Denmark Faroe Islands
- Location: Suðuroy, Faroe Islands

Borgarknappur is a mountain in Suðuroy, Faroe Islands.

== Features ==
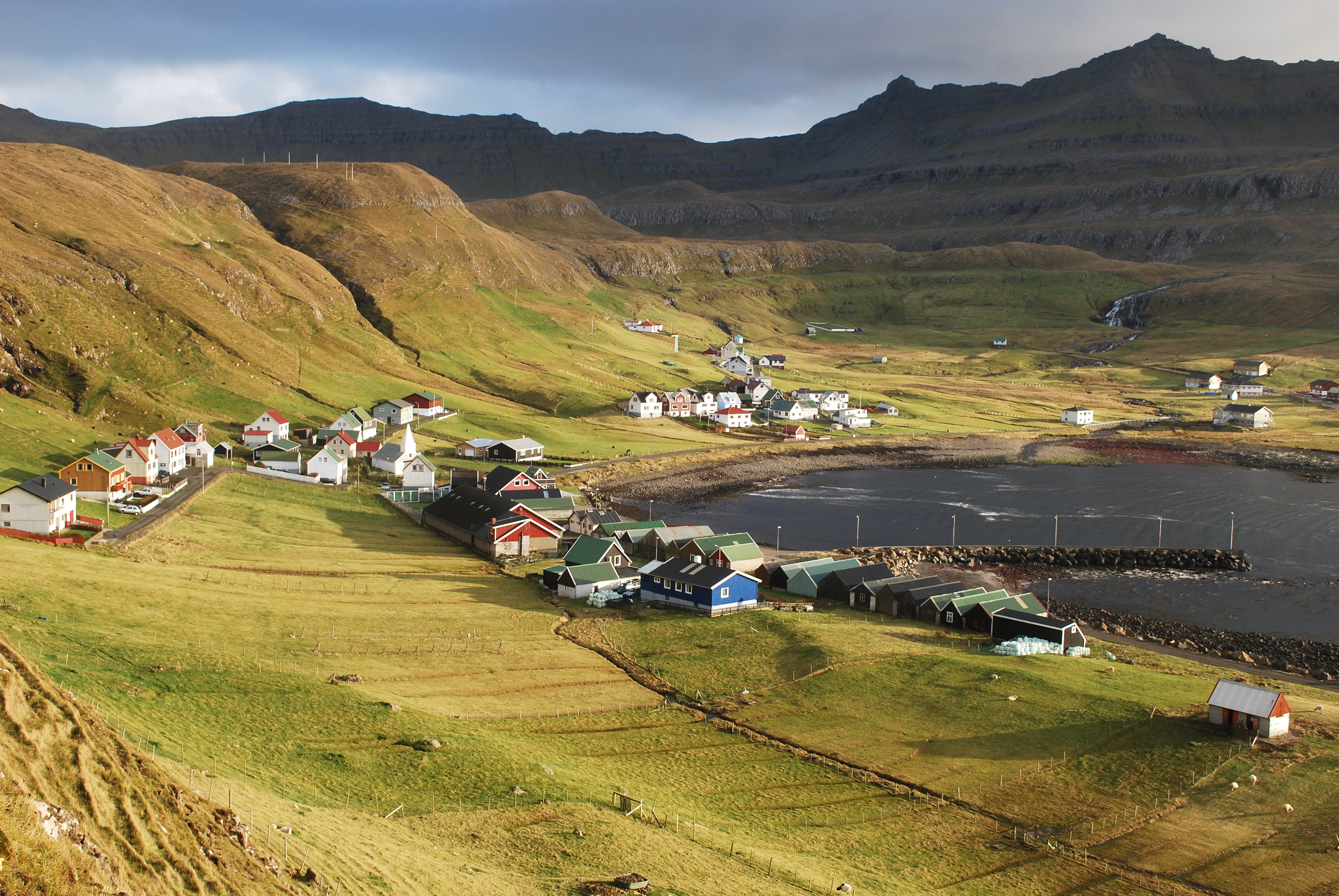
Borgarknappur as seen from Fámjin

Borgarknappur is 574 metres (1,883 ft) high. It is located in the center of the island, west of the village Hov and south-east of Fámjin, south-west of Øravík and north of Vágur. Another mountain peak, Borgin (570 m or 1,870 ft high), is just west of Borgarknappur, and the mountain Hvannafelli (558 m or 1,831 ft high) is further south.

Before the roads were made between the villages in Suðuroy, there were paths between the villages over the mountains. Several of these paths met near Borgarknappur, in Mannaskarð and near the mountain Laðanfelli (487 m or 1,598 ft high). To help people find their way up in the mountains there were cairns along the paths. Most of these cairns remain and are now mostly used for hiking trips for people and tourists. The paths which meet in Mannaskarð, near Borgarknappur, come from the villages of Øravík, Fámjin, Porkeri, Hov and Vágur.
