= Suðuroy =

Suðuroy Suderø (Danish)
- Island
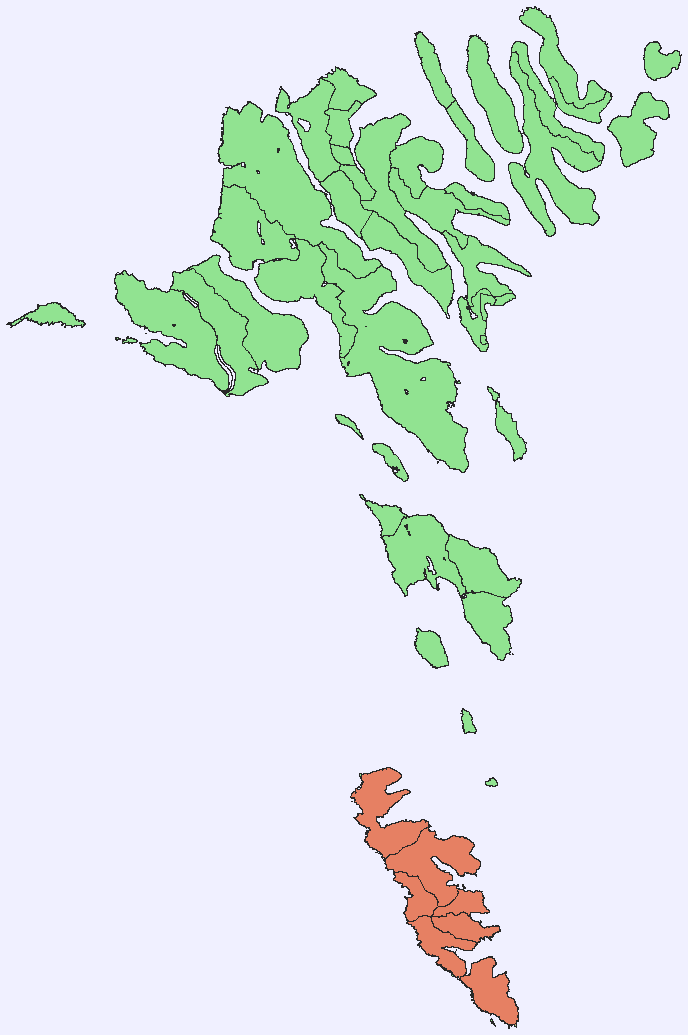
- Location within the Faroe Islands
- Coordinates: 61°32′N 6°51′W
- State: Kingdom of Denmark
- Constituent country: Faroe Islands
- Region: Suðuroy

Area
  - Total: 163.7 km^{2} (63.2 sq mi)
- Highest elevation: 610 m (2,000 ft)

Population (1-2020)
  - Total: 4,601
  - Density: 28.11/km^{2} (72.79/sq mi)
- Time zone: UTC+0 (GMT)
  - Summer (DST): UTC+1 (EST)
- Calling code: 298

Suðuroy (pronounced: [ˈsuːwʊɻɔi] or [ˈsuːɻi], lit. ‘South Island’, Danish: Suderø) is the southernmost of the Faroe Islands. The island covers 163.7 square kilometres (63.2 sq mi). In 2018 the population was 4,601. Suðuroy region (sýsla) comprises this island and Lítla Dímun, the next isle northward in the Faroes, which is uninhabited.

== History ==
One ancient settlement, Víkarbyrgi was abandoned late in the 1990s. Another settlement, Akraberg was abandoned around 1350 because of the Black Death; the people who lived there at that time came from Friesland, and legend has it that people in Hørg (in Sumba) can trace their ancestry back to this settlement, which was situated on the southernmost point of the island.

In the 17th century, Suðuroy was subjected to repeated attacks by North African pirates, who in the Faroe Islands were referred to as Turks when North Africa belonged to the Ottoman Empire. One well known such incident was the Slave raid of Suðuroy. They abducted several women and children. Famine ensued, and many of the island's inhabitants died of starvation. In 1615, the pirate-plagued Hvalba was rescued by two Danish warships in the spring. The pirates, who used Hvalba as a kind of base port, had unfortunately sailed 14 days before the arrival of the Danish squadron.

The village of Sandvík was re-established in the 19th century. Fámara was re-settled in 2010 with the expansion of Vágur beyond its original town borders. Two more settlements were started in the early and mid-20th century: Botni, northwest of Vágur, and Tjaldavík, in a bay southeast of Øravík. Both sites have been abandoned again.

Suðuroy's population has been falling gradually since the 1970s. In 1985, the island had 5,881 inhabitants, but by 2019 the population fell to a record low of 4,591.

== Geography ==
The highest point of Suðuroy is the mountain Gluggarnir (610 metres or 2,001 feet), but the most famous peak is definitely the mountain of Beinisvørð northwest of the village of Sumba. The Beinisvørð and its scenery have been praised by the local poet Poul F. Joensen (1898–1970), as well as other Faroese poets. Suðuroy is the island which has the most islets and skerries. Suðuroy and the islets and skerries near the island number 263, including the island itself.

The inhabited settlements on Suðuroy include, from north to south: Sandvík, Hvalba, Froðba, Tvøroyri, Trongisvágur, Øravík, Fámjin, Hov, Porkeri, Nes, Vágur, Fámara, Akrar, Lopra and Sumba.

Suðuroy is also the only island of the Faroes which has coalmines, one of which is still active. It is located in Hvalba, near the tunnel. Other coalmines were in Rangabotnur in Trongisvágur (on the south side of Trongisvágsfjørður), and in Fámjin. The bays of Øravík, Trongisvágur, Fámjin, Vágur and Hvalba are designated grind bays.

In contrast to the name Suðuroy (South Island, singular), the name Suðuroyggjar (Southern Islands, plural) refers to the Outer Hebrides in Scotland. To refer to the islands south of Skopunarfjørður one can colloquially say (going) "sunnanfjørðs" or formally Suðurøkið.

=== Important Bird Area ===
The western side of the island has been identified as an Important Bird Area by BirdLife International because of its significance as a breeding site for seabirds, especially northern fulmars (100,000 pairs), European storm petrels (2500 pairs), European shags (200 pairs), black-legged kittiwakes (39,000 pairs), Atlantic puffins (20,000 pairs), common guillemots (31,900 individuals) and black guillemots (400 pairs).

== Transport and infrastructure ==
MS Smyril operates two to three times daily between Tórshavn and Suðuroy, leaving from the new ferry port of Krambatangi on the south side of the fjord of Trongisvágsfjørður. The journey takes two hours. There are two national bus routes in Suðuroy, route 700 operates between Tvøroyri and Sumba (the southern line) and 701 between Fámjin and Sandvík (the northern line). There is a heliport at Froðba with flights to Tórshavn and Vágar Airport.

A road network runs the entire length of the island, including five road tunnels: the Sandvíkartunnilin (1969), the old and new Hvalbiartunnilin (1965 and 2021), Hovstunnilin (2007) and Sumbiartunnilin (1997). The Fámjinstunnilin will be started with in 2022. The proposed Suðuroyartunnilin would connect the island with Skúvoy and Sandoy, replacing the ferry Smyril.

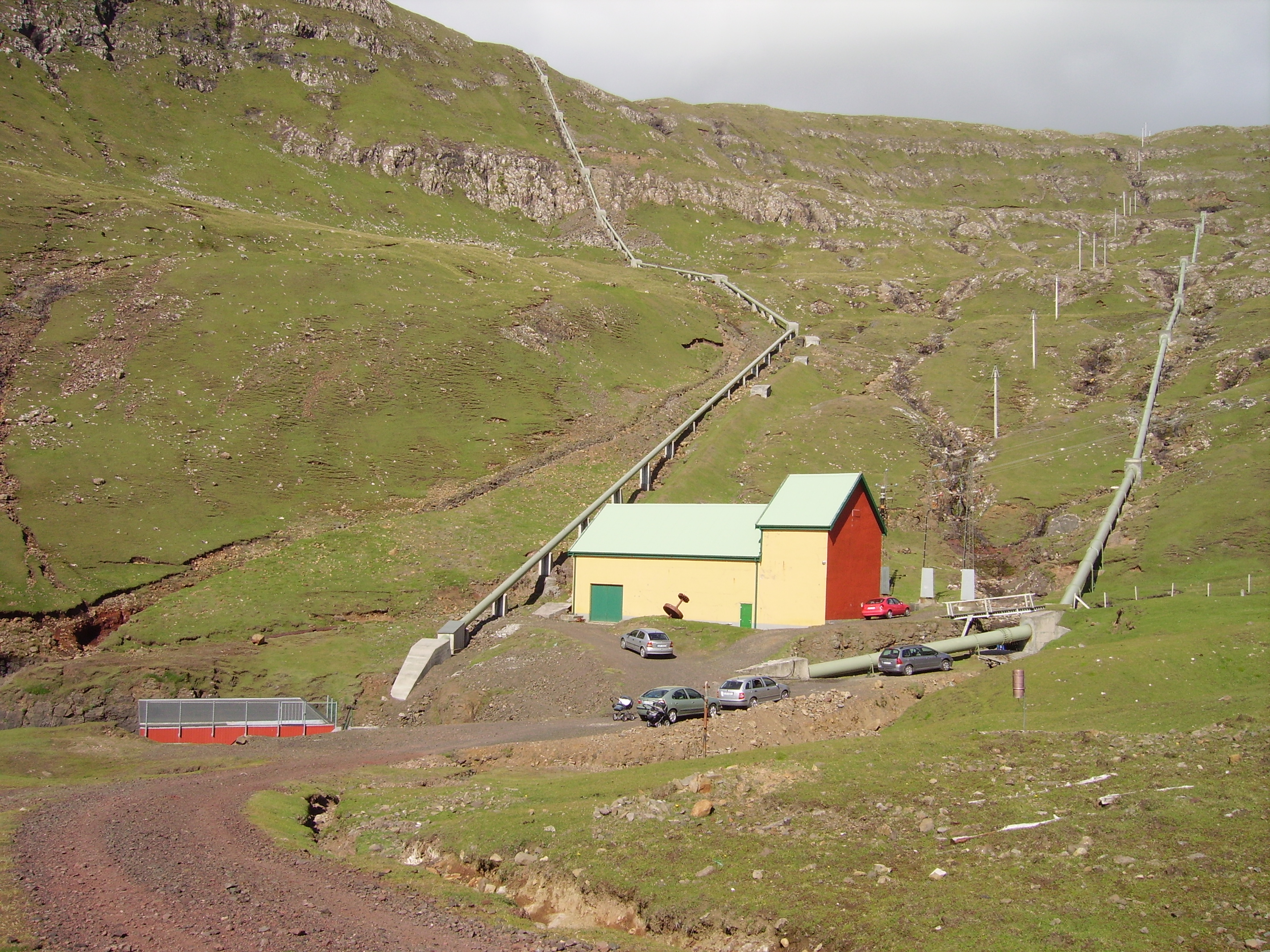
The 3.3 MW Botnur Hydroelectric Power Plant was built in 1921.

The Suðuroy electricity grid depends on the Vágur 13 MW diesel, 6.3 MW wind turbines and the 3.3 MW hydro Botnur power plant. The island is not connected to other islands. A 250 kW solar park was installed at Sumba in 2019, and produces 2 MWh/day at best. Power supply agency SEV calculated that two 900 kW wind turbines could save DKK 6 million per year on diesel, and seven Enercon wind turbines at a combined 6.3 MW were installed at Porkeri Mountains in 2020. The wind turbines reduced the consumption of oil. A 6MW / 7.5MWh grid battery and a syncron compensator is planned to stabilize the grid.

== Sights and activities ==
=== Cliffs ===
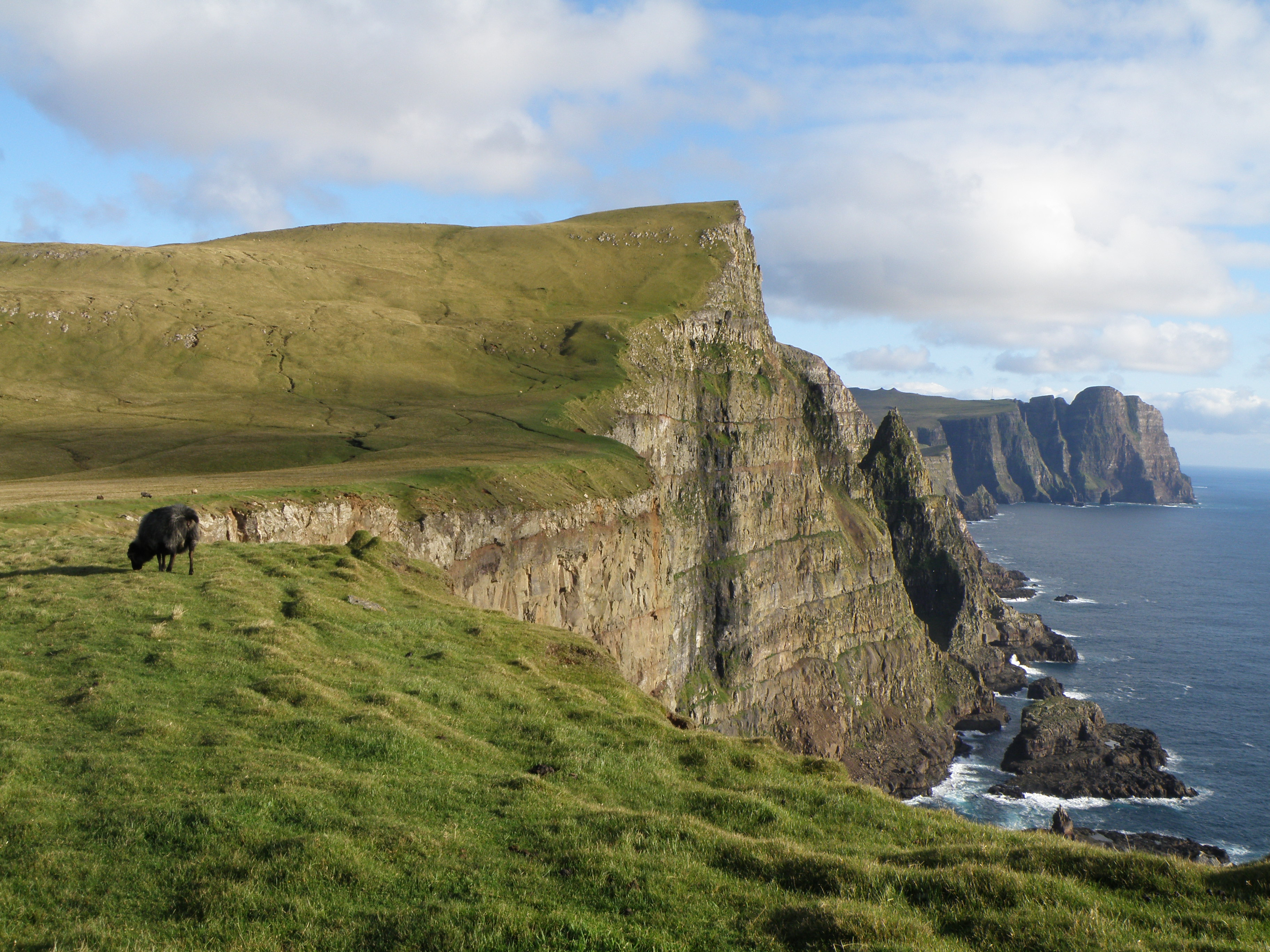
View from Eggjarnar

Vágseiði is a place with 200-metre-high (660 ft) cliffs towards south, but the road is down by the sea, the skerries are called Heltnarnar and a cliff on Vágseiði is called Múlatangi.

Eggjarvegur on the south side of the fjord, Vágsfjørður, leads up to Eggjarnar, 200 m (660 ft) on a vertical cliff with a view towards Beinisvørð in the south and to Vágseiði in the north. On Eggjarnar, visitors can find two concrete bunkers which were British observation points during World War II. There is also an abandoned former Loran-C radar station, as it closed down in the mid-1970s.

South of Eggjarnar is the isthmus of Lopra, Lopranseiði, which is around 50 metres (160 ft) above sea level. An islet called Lopranshólmur is just a few metres from the cliffs of Lopranseiði. The cliff Beinisvørð is south of Lopranseiði, in between are some skerries, where the Dutch ship SS Westerbeek was shipwrecked in 1742. Eighty-four men were on board, three died when the ship ran aground, one fell down while trying to climb the cliff, but eighty men survived. They had to climb up the vertical cliff in order to survive, they found a place on the cliff where they could stand, they climbed from the ship to the cliff by the broken mast.

=== Fámjin ===
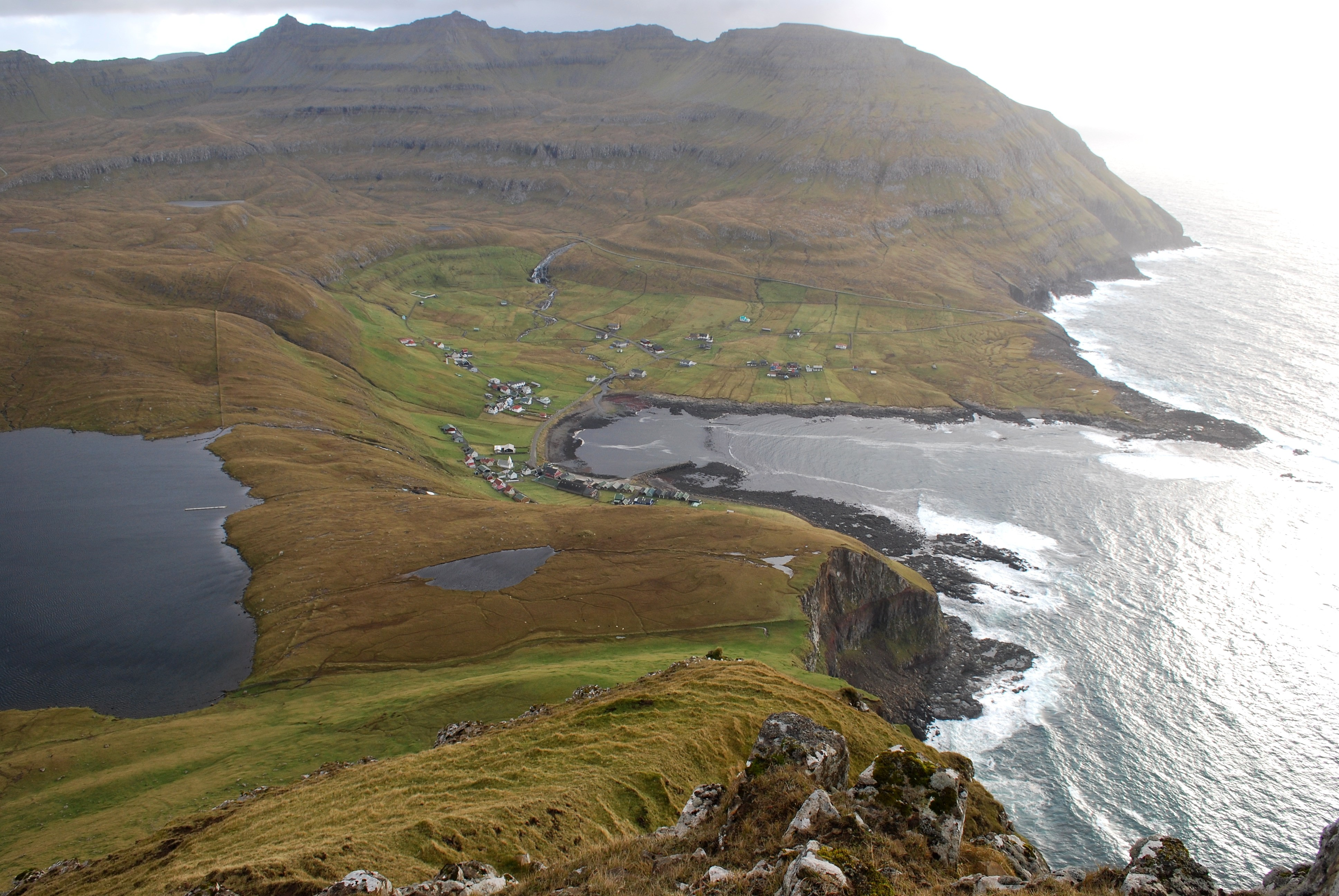
Fámjin is surrounded by some of the highest mountains of Suðuroy. The lake at left is Kirkjuvatn.

Fámjin is one of two villages which are located on the west coast of Suðuroy, Sumba is the other one. All the other villages are located on the east coast. Fámjin has a special reef in the middle of the bay, which close the bay at low tide, except for a sailing channel made by men in order for fishing boats to be able to go fishing. The small fishing harbour is inside this reef. There is a lake just above the village, called Kirkjuvatn, the path starts near the church. Another attraction in Fámjin are the cliffs and gorge west of the village, called Prestgjógv (Priest Gorge). The main attraction of Fámjin however is the original Faroese flag, Merkið, which is hanging inside of the church. It was made in 1919, by some Faroese students who studied in Copenhagen. One of them was Jens Oliver Lisberg from Fámjin. The flag was not recognized as the official flag of the Faroe Islands until World War II, when the Faroes were occupied by the British, and Denmark by Germany, and the islands needed their own flag. Since then, the Merkið has been the official flag of the Faroe Islands. Inside the church of Fámjin is also the Fámjin stone, a Runestone with runic inscriptions.

=== Hikes ===
Tvøroyri there is an attractive walk across the mountains to a valley called Hvannhagi. There is a view over the valley and to Lítla Dímun and Stóra Dímun and the sea from above the valley. No roads lead to this valley.

=== Jóansøka ===
Tvøroyri and Vágur take turns in hosting an annual civic Midsummer festival called Jóansøka. It can be described as a smaller version of the Ólavsøka held in Tórshavn. It runs in late June, in the last weekend of June, the rowing competition is always on Saturday of the Jóansøka weekend.

=== Theatres ===
In Øravíkarlíð near the ferry terminal the island's main cultural venue SALT sits in a former salt silo. It was abandoned in 1980 and after repurposing opened as a theatre in 2017.

== Sports in Suðuroy ==
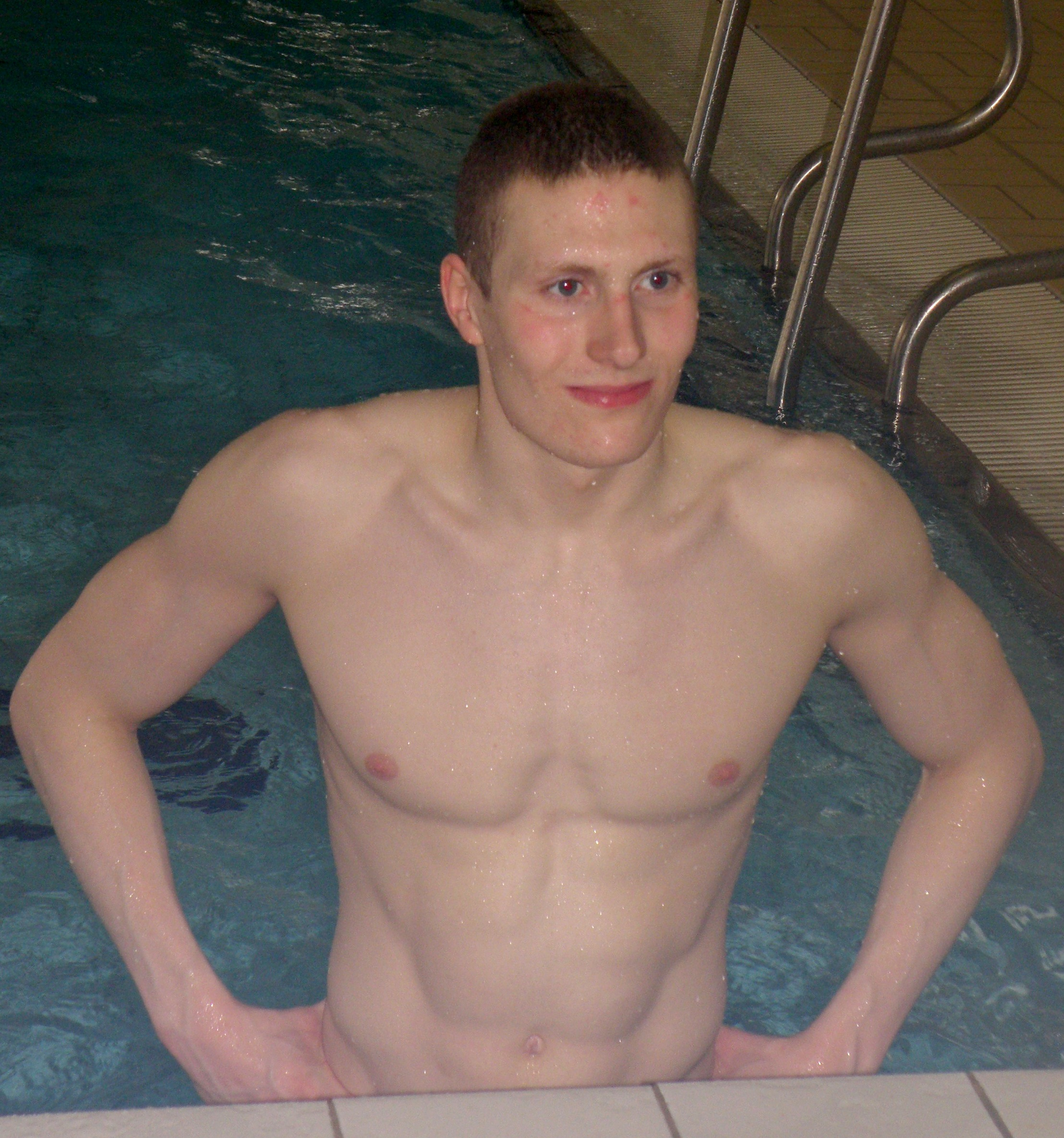
Pál Joensen

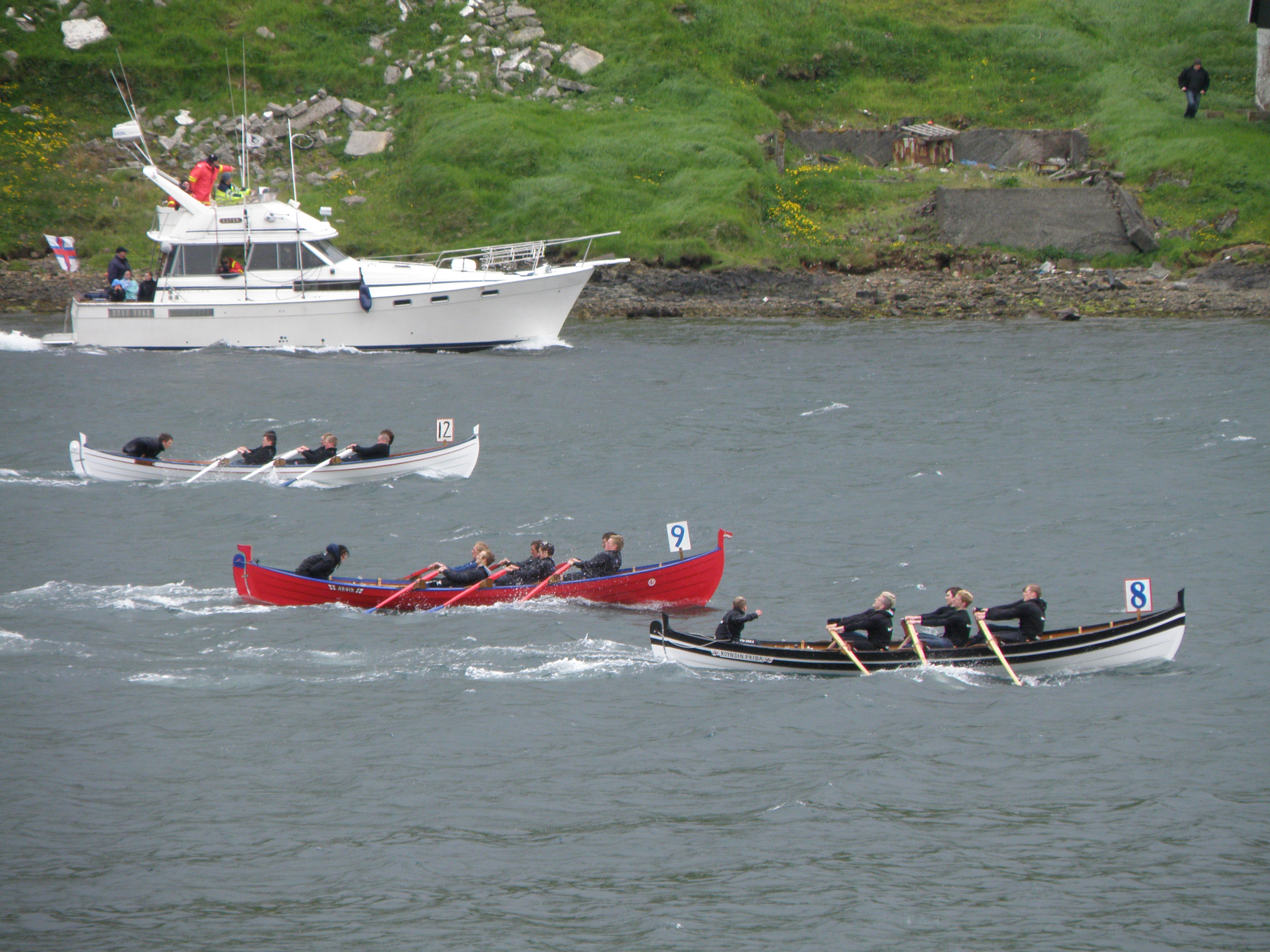
Rowing competition at Jóansøka in Vágur in June 2010.

=== Football in Suðuroy ===
The oldest sports club in the Faroe Islands, the football club Tvøroyrar Bóltfelag (TB) was founded in Tvøroyri on May 13, 1892, and is thereby the 9th oldest football club in the Danish Kingdom. There were three other football clubs in Suðuroy: Vágs Bóltfelag, (VB), Royn from Hvalba and the football club from Sumba, but VB Vágur and Sumba merged in 2005 to VB/Sumba (a similar merger under the name Sumba/VB had been attempted in the 1995 season but it lasted only this one season). On January 1, 2010, a new football club has been founded in Suðuroy, it is called FC Suðuroy and currently consists of the prior VB/Sumba.

TB Tvøroyri currently (2013) competes in the best Faroese football division; FC Suðuroy plays in the second best division. Both TB Tvøroyri and VB Vágur have won the Faroese National Championship (TB seven times, the last being in 1987, and VB once in the year 2000); but since the success is lacking in recent years, there is a growing debate about merging the four teams into one, (VB and Sumba have, as mentioned above, already joined forces since 2005). Royn Hvalba is playing in 3rd division in 2013.

=== Swimming in Suðuroy ===
Suðuroy has recently had good results in international swimming competitions. The two swimming clubs in Suðuroy "Vágs Svimjifelag" and "Tvøroyrar Svimjifelag" joined forces 6 September 2007 and founded Susvim, which is for the whole island. A young man from Vágur has had the best results until now. Pál Joensen won triple gold in the 2008 European Junior Swimming Championships on the short course in the men's 400 M, 800 M and 1500 M Freestyle. Two years later he won silver in the Men's 1500 M Freestyle at the 2010 European Aquatics Championships. Other swimmers from Susvim have also had good results in Faroe Islands and in Denmark and other countries and at the Island Games competitions.

=== Rowing in Suðuroy ===
There are two active rowing clubs in Suðuroy, Vágs Kappróðrarfelag from Vágur and Froðbiar Sóknar Róðrarfelag from Tvøroyri and the villages around Trongisvágsfjørður (fjord). There are also rowing clubs in Sumba and in Hvalba. In Sumba they had a boat which was called Broddur, but they have not been active for some years now. In Hvalba they had a boat which was named Snopprikkur after a well-known man from the history of Suðuroy (Suðuroyar Sagnir). Vágs Kappróðrarfelag has these boats: Royndin Fríða, which is a so-called 5-mannafar, Smyril, which is a 6-mannafar, and Toftaregin, which is an 8-mannafar and Vágbingur, which is a 10-mannafar. Froðbiar Sóknar Róðrarfelag has the boats Firvaldur, which is a 5-mannafar (Firvaldur means Butterfly), Firildur and Hulda are also 5-mannafar, Tvørábáturin is a 6-mannafar, Suðringur and another Tvørábáturin are 10-mannafar (there are two boats which are called Tvørábáturin, which means the boat from Tvøroyri).

== Gallery ==
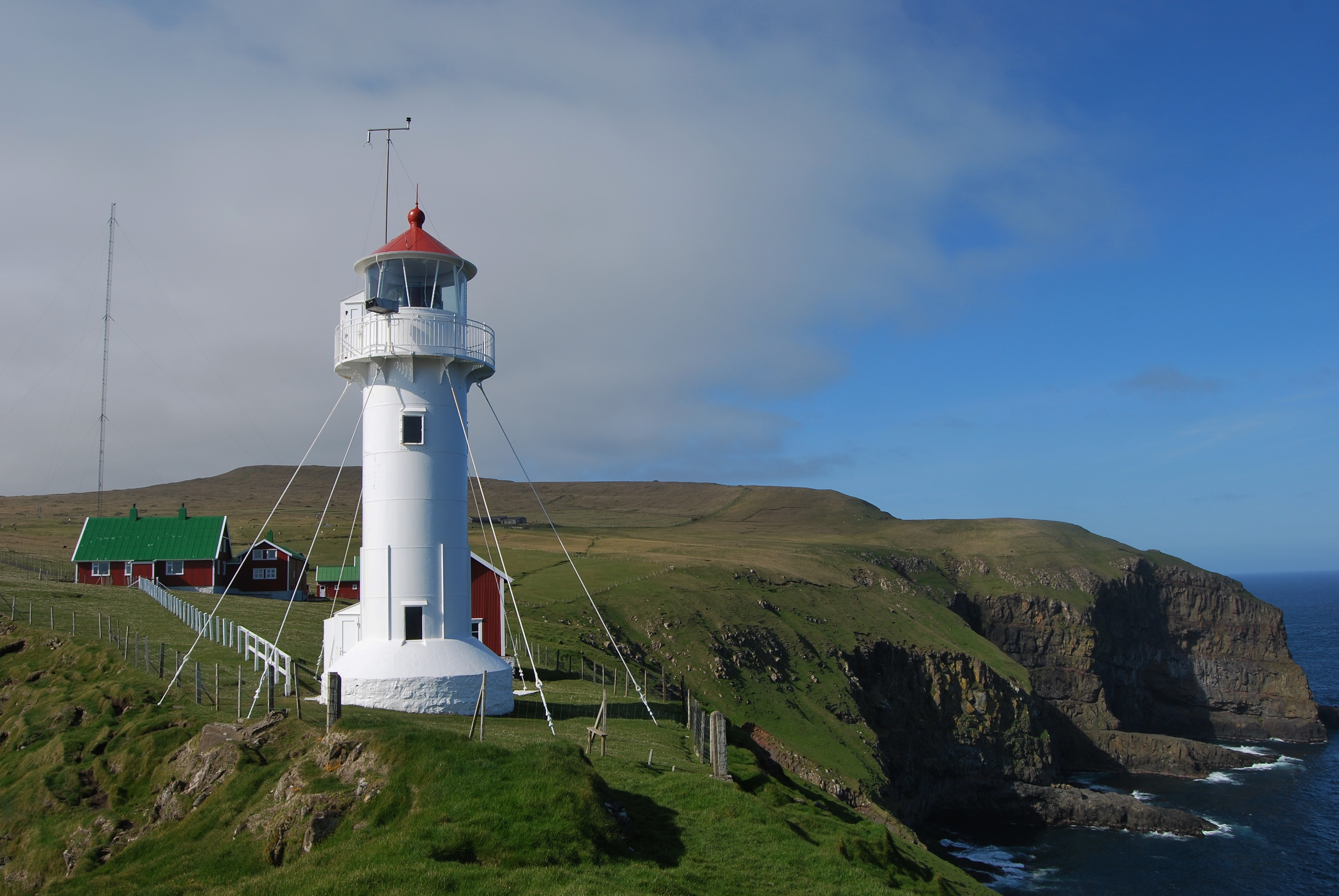
Lighthouse Akraberg build 1909.

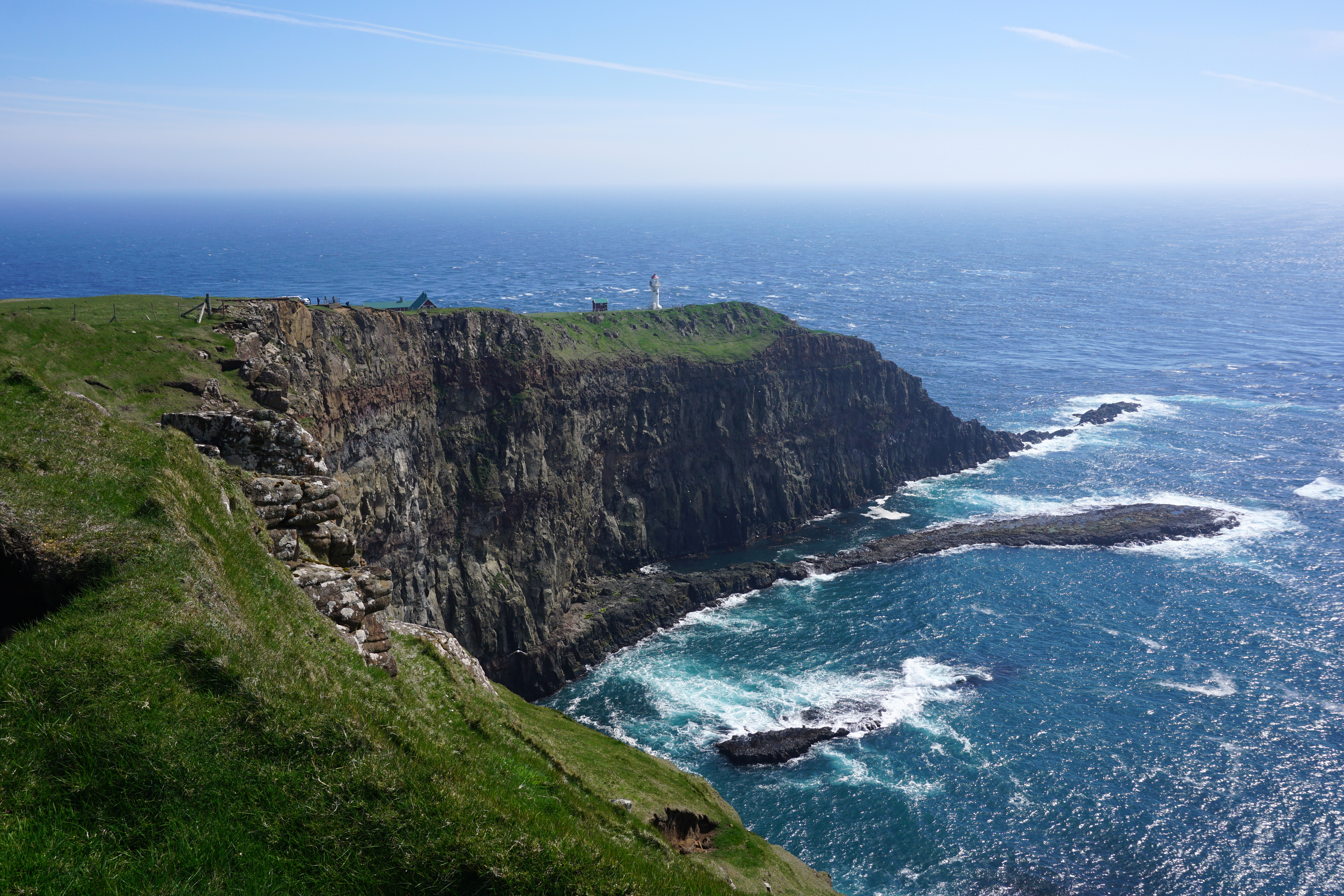
View towards south from the headland of Akraberg, which is the southernmost tip of Suðuroy.

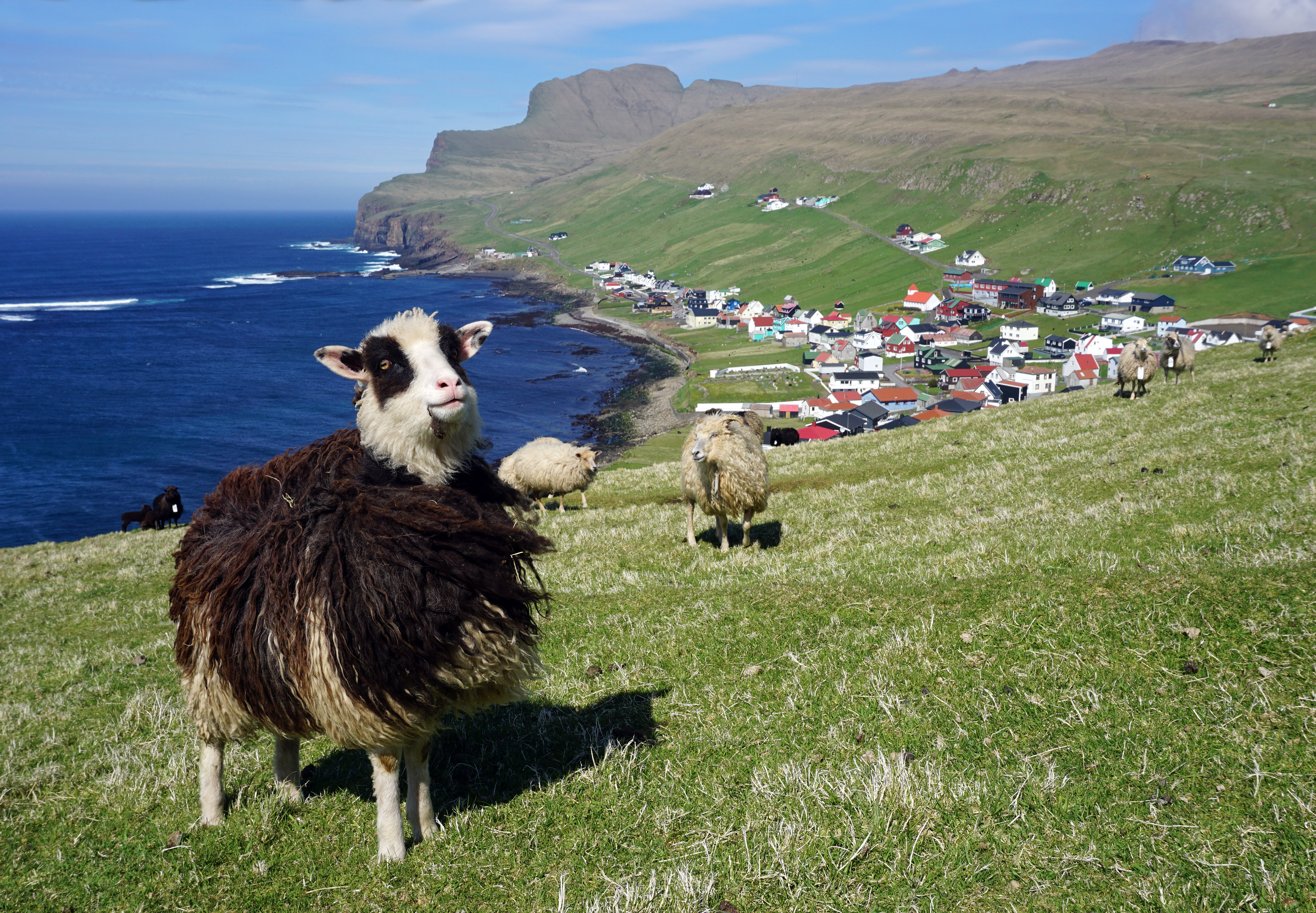
Sumba

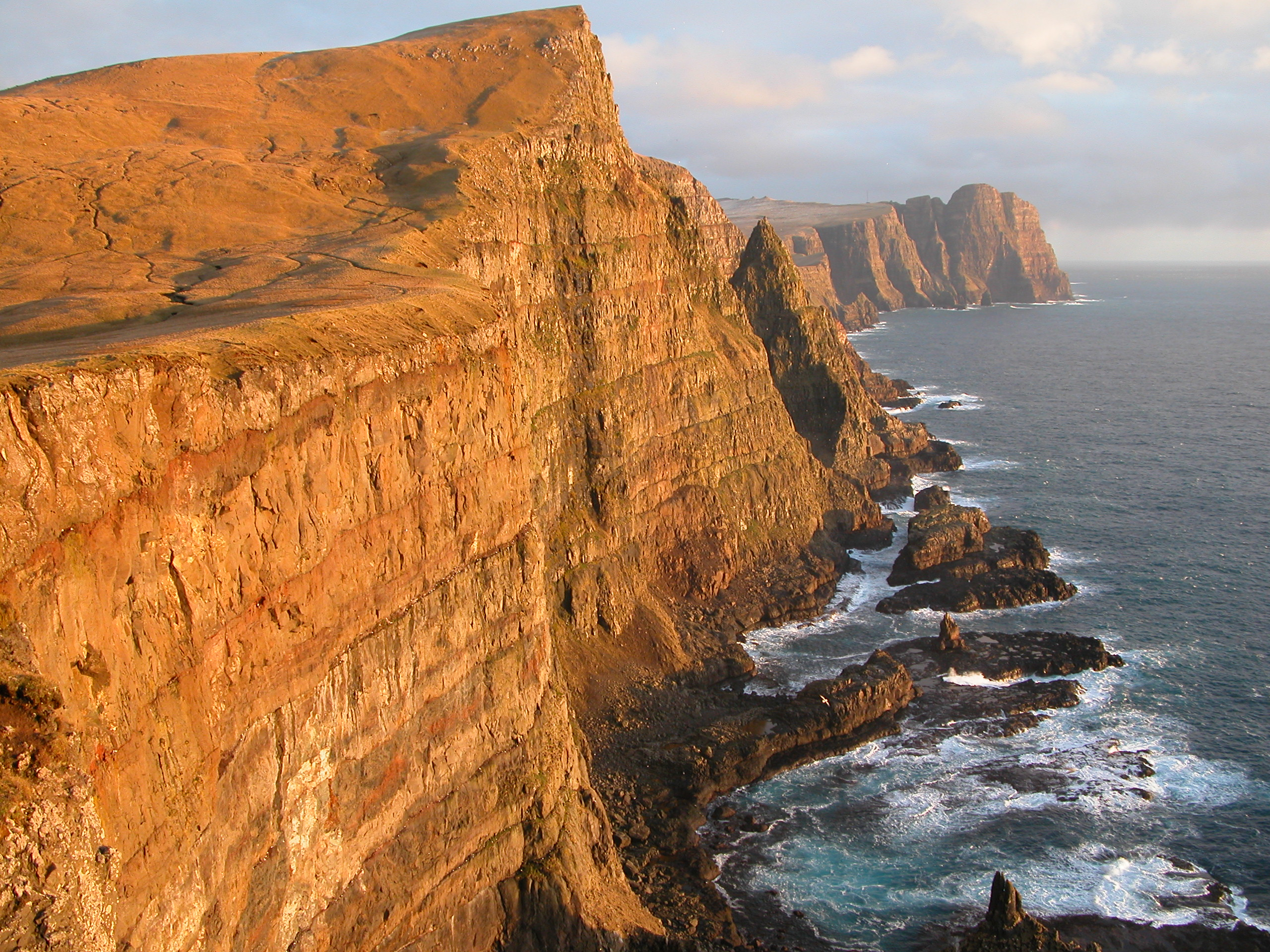
The westcoast between Beinisvørð and Vágur

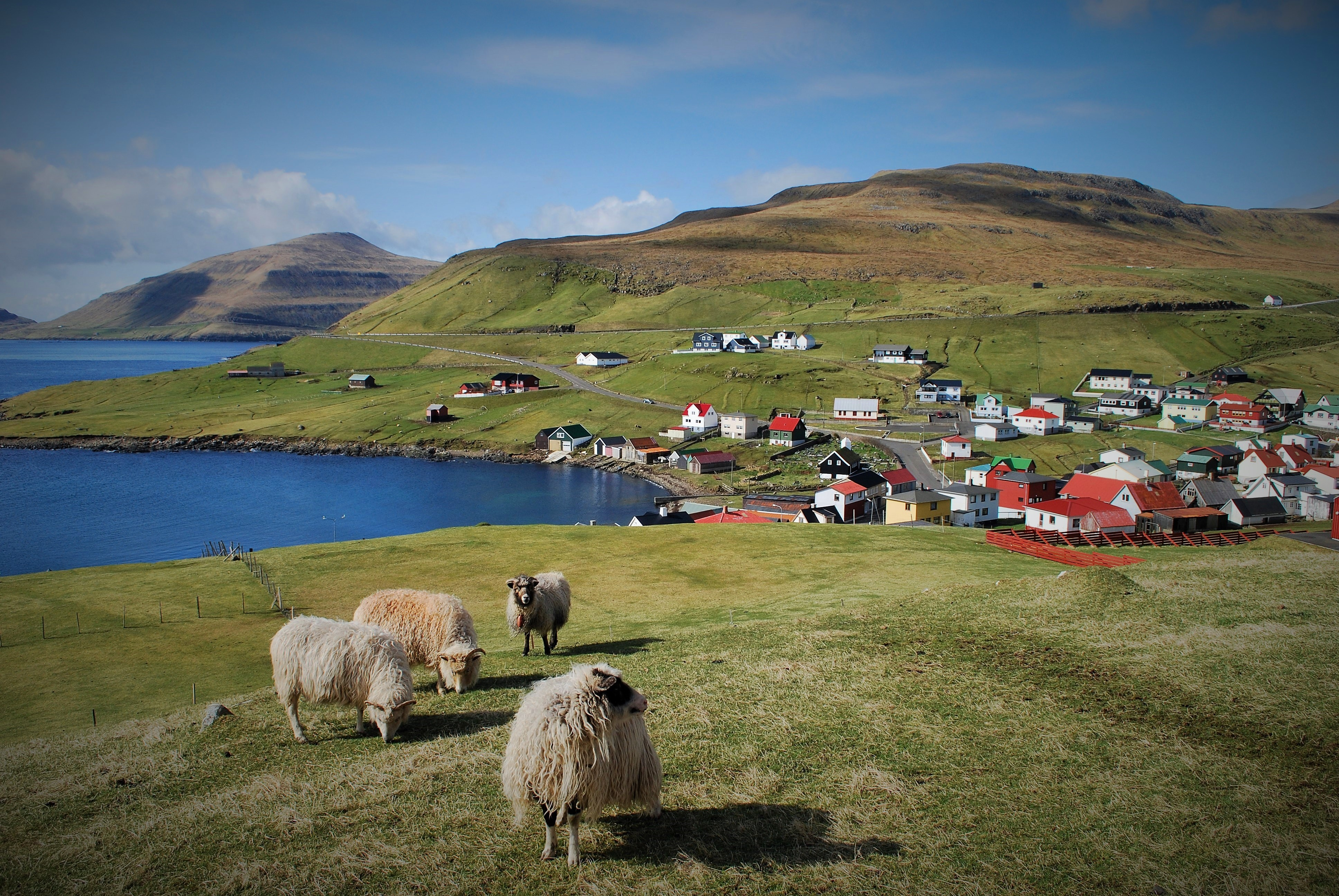
Porkeri

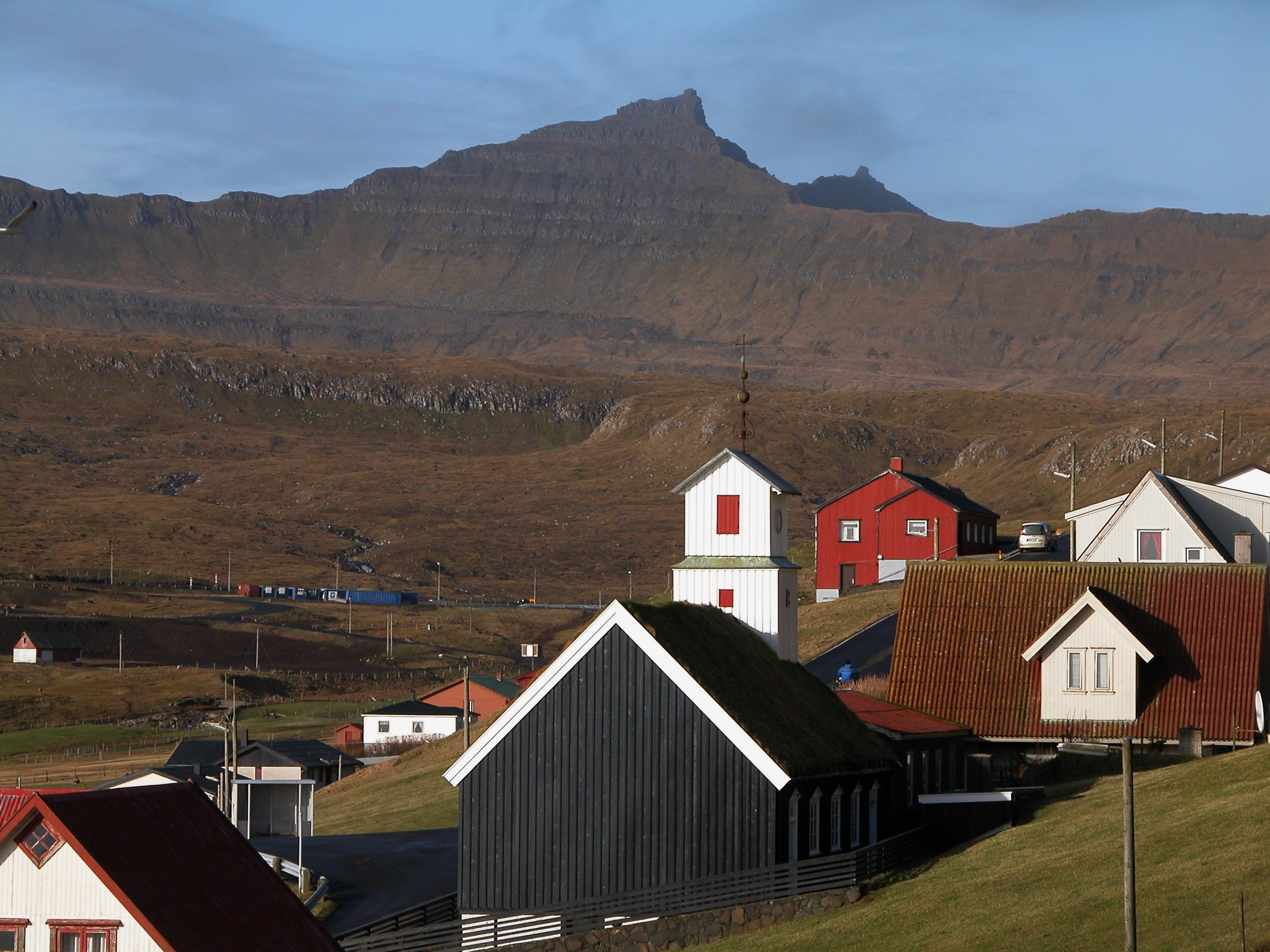
Hov with Borgaknappur in the background.

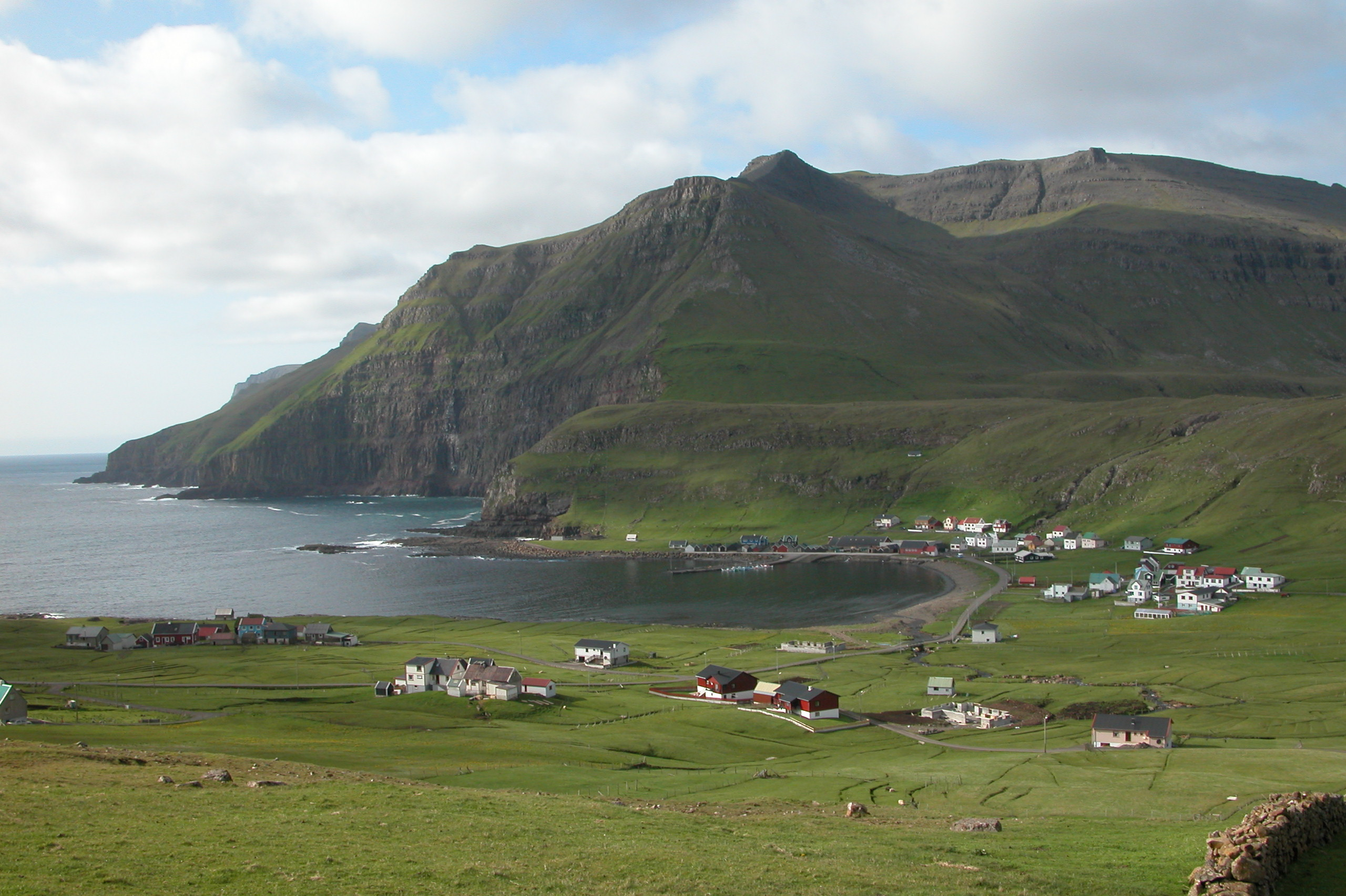
Fámjin

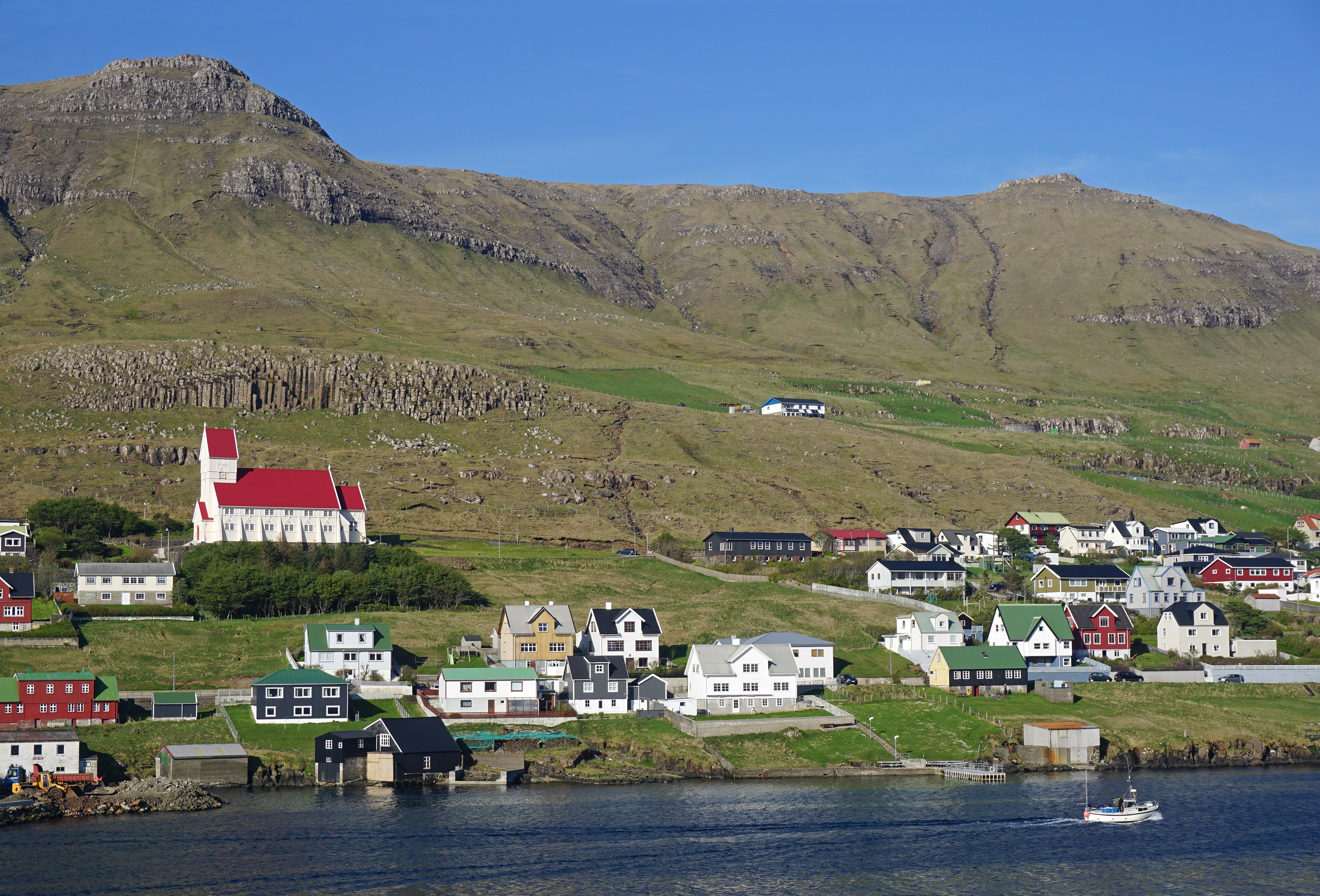
Tvøroyri seen from M/F Smyril.

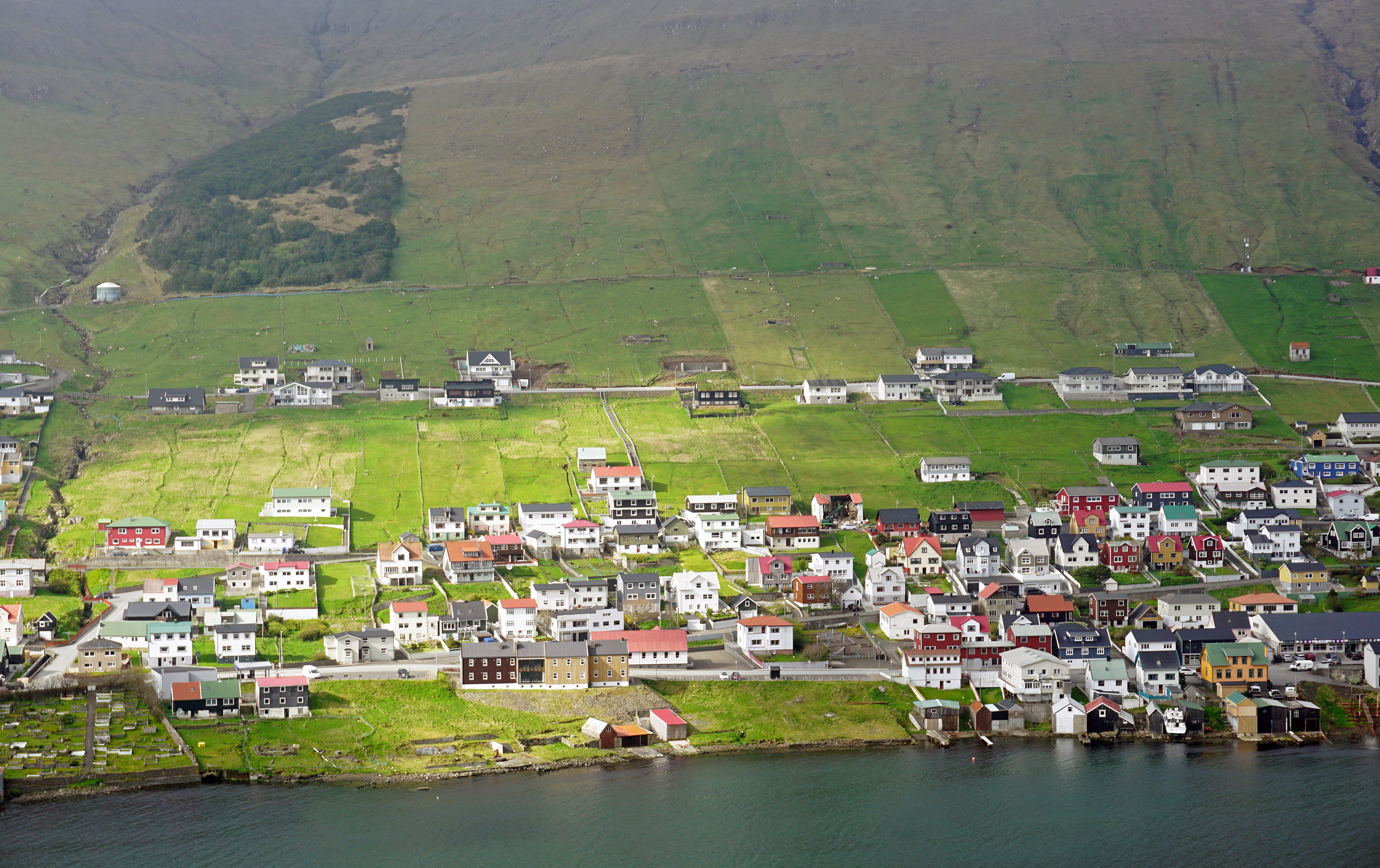
Vágur

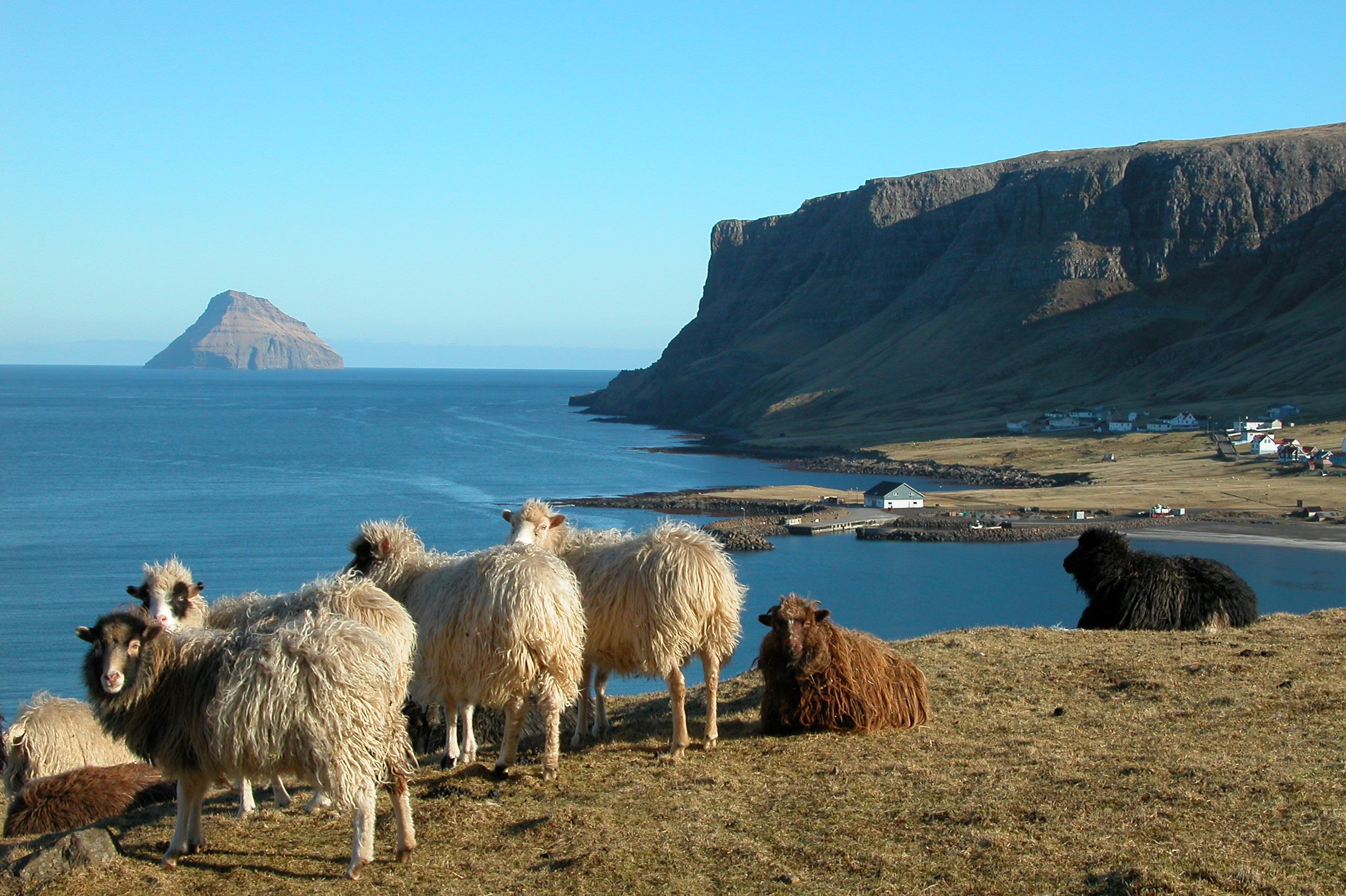
Hvalba and Lítla Dímun

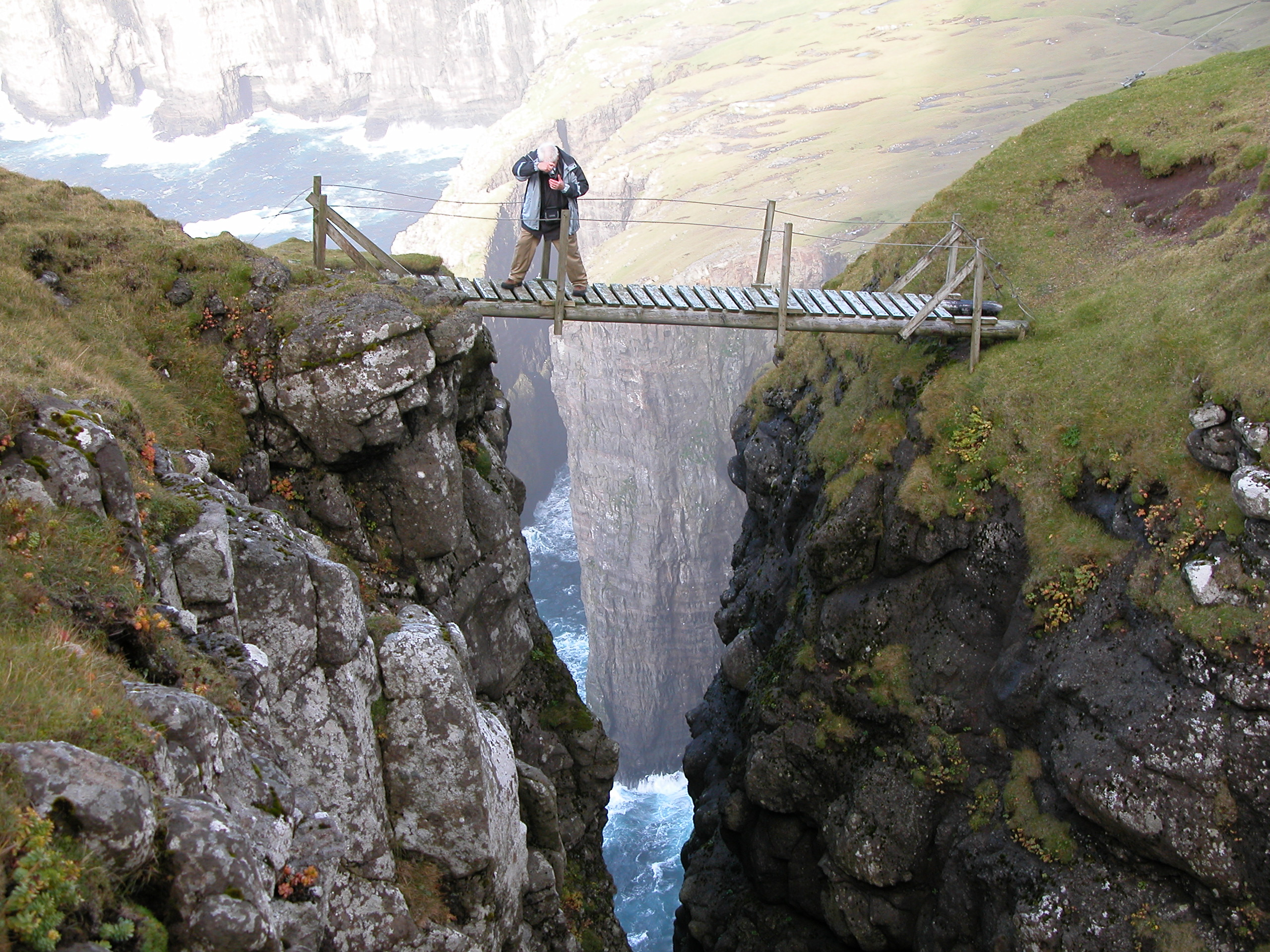
Glyvrabergsgjógv, west of Sandvík

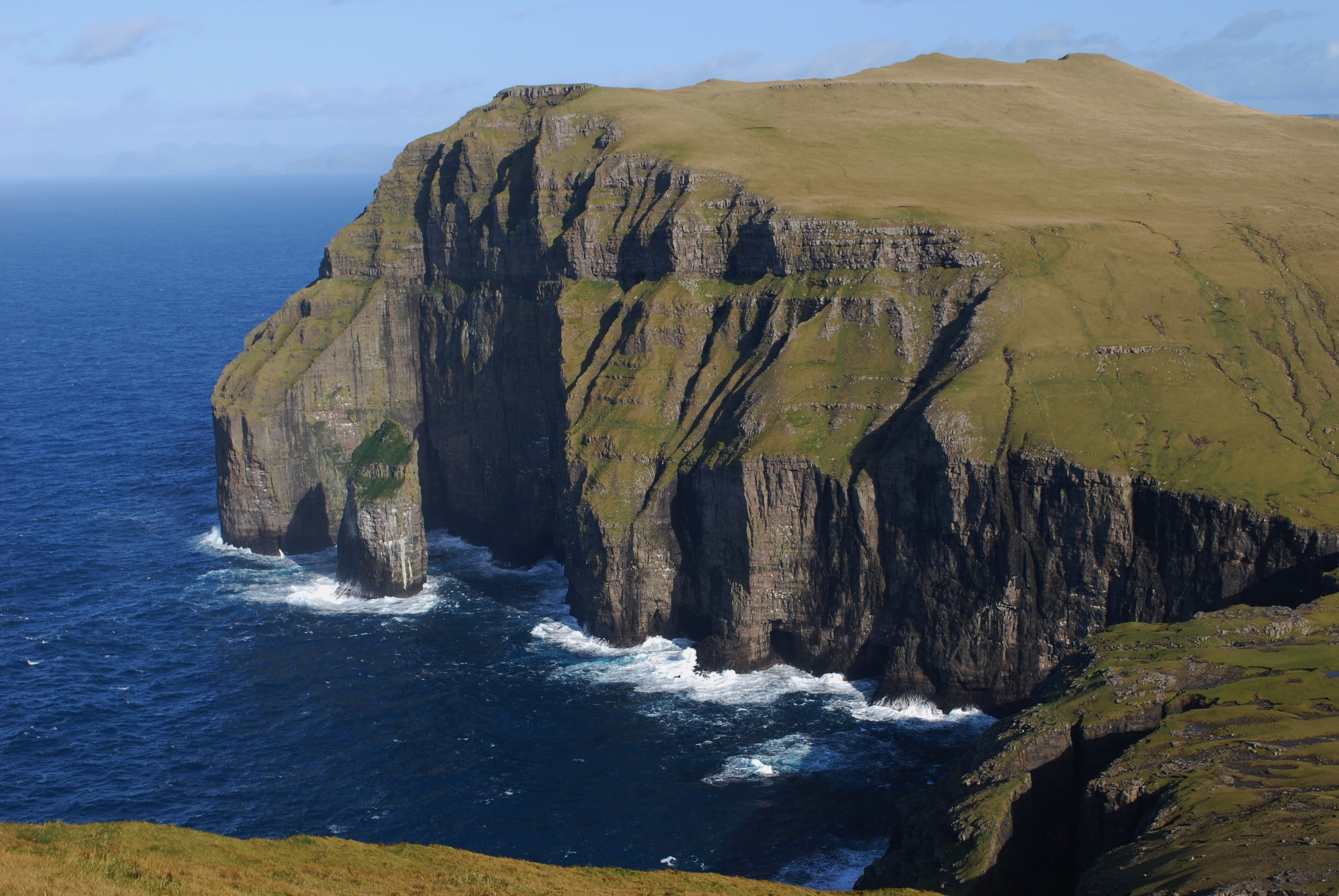
Ásmundarstakkur west of Sandvík

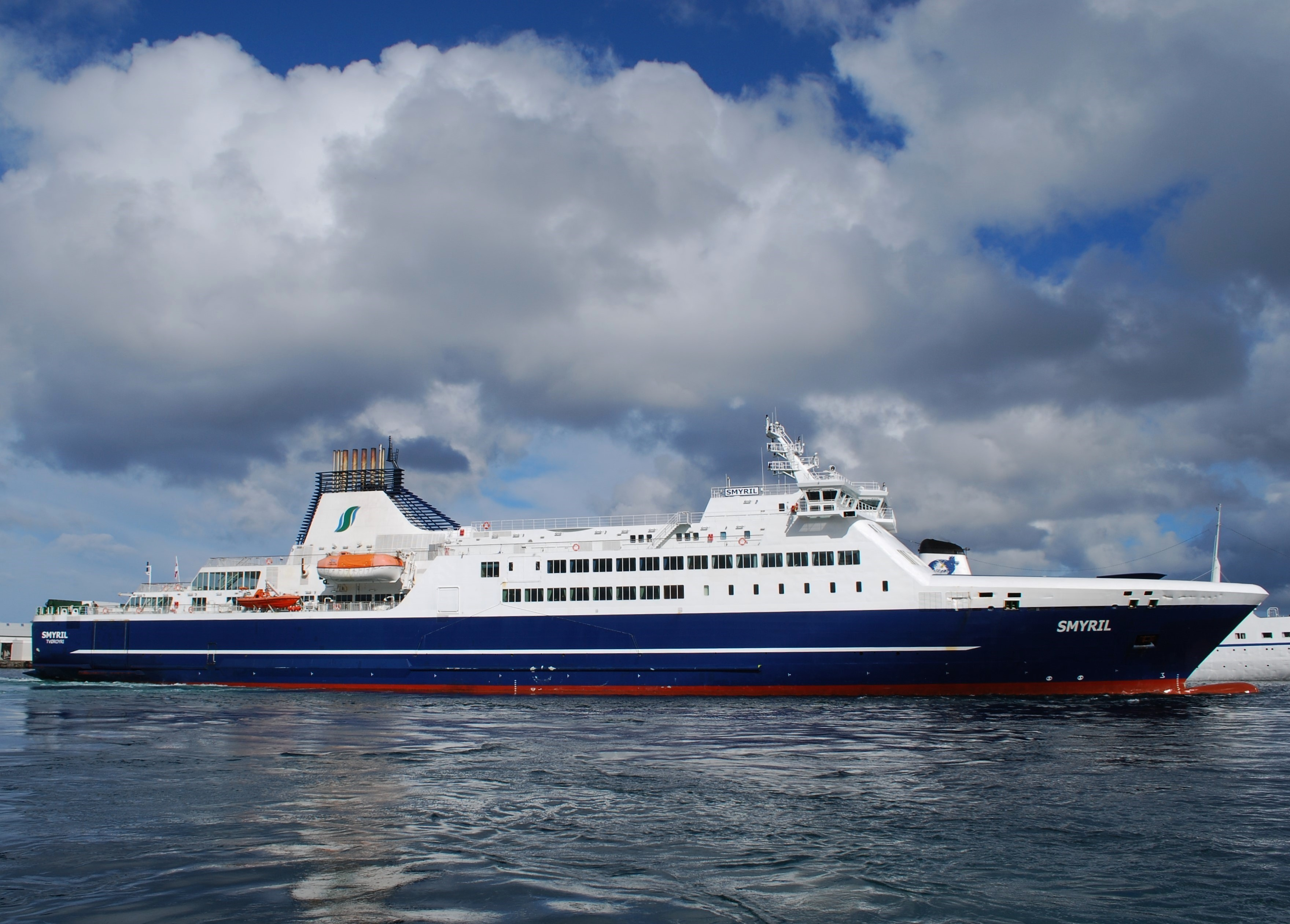
M/F Smyril, the ferry between Suðuroy and Tórshavn.

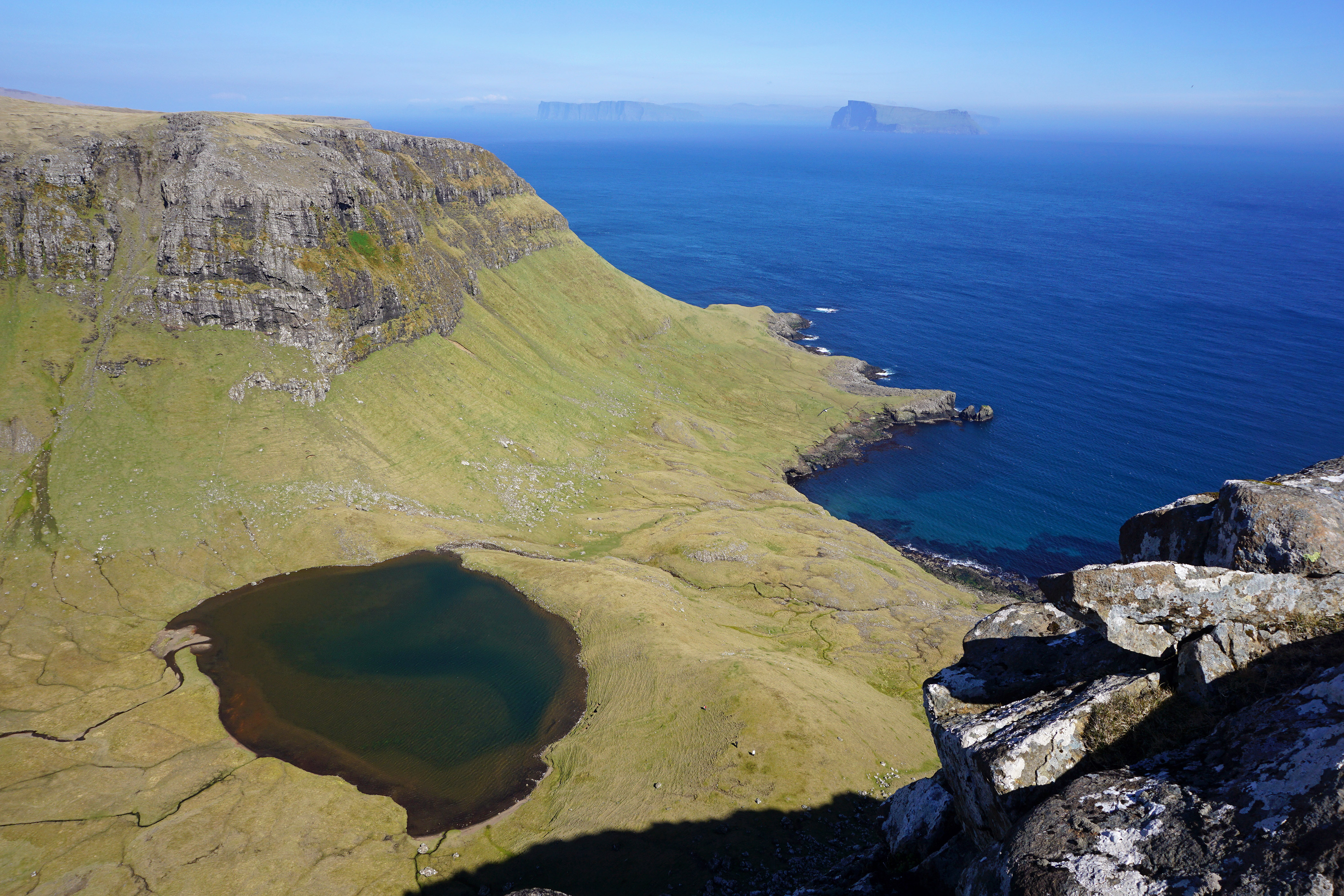
Hvannhagi

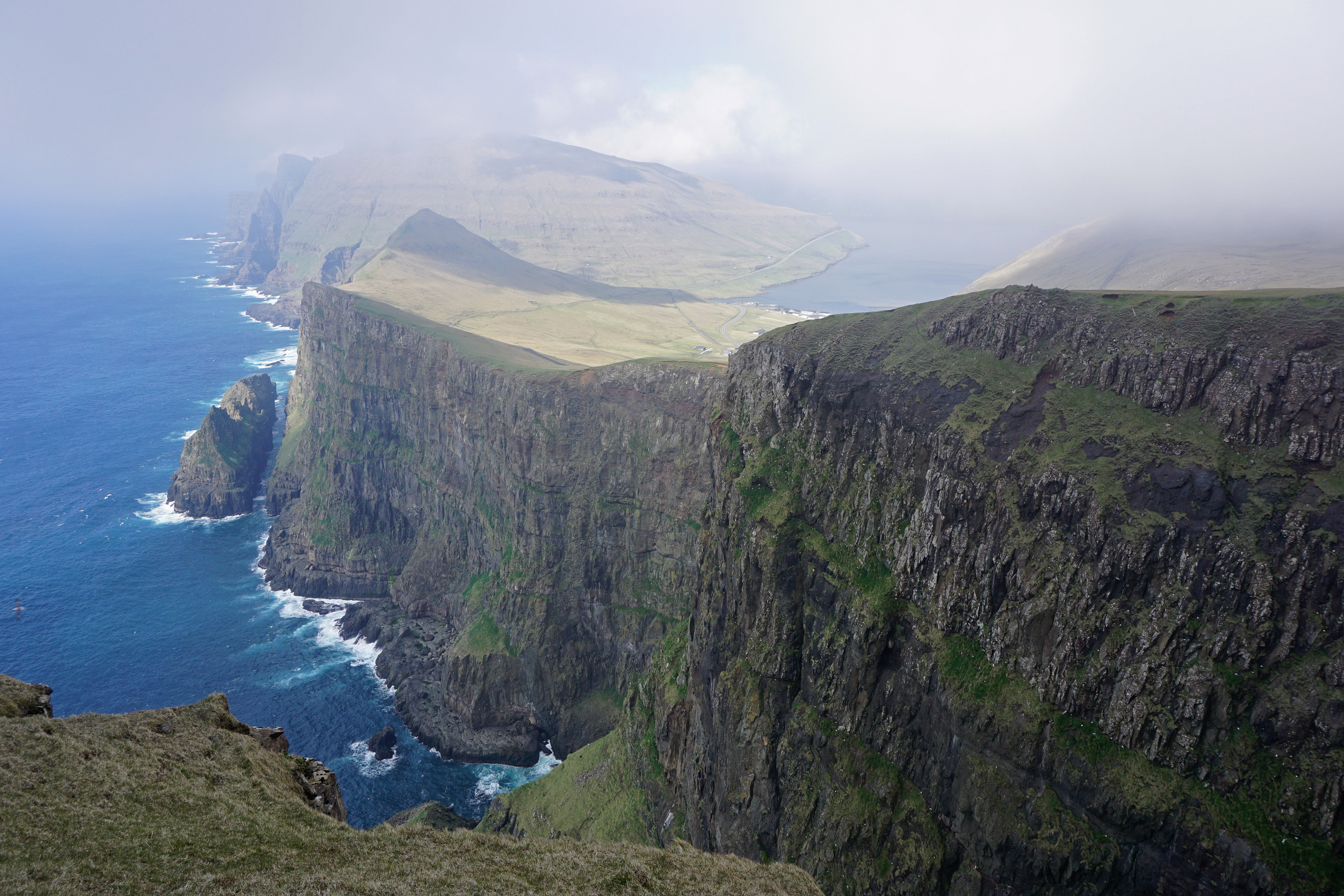
View towards north from Beinisvørð, Suðuroy.

== Sources ==
- Hagstova.fo, Faroe Islands Statistics
- Susvim

== Bibliography ==
- Joensen, H.D. (1981). Sambandið føroyinga og útlendinga millum. Hugleiðingar um viðurskiftini frá 1273 til 1856 [The relationship between Faroese and foreigners. Reflections on the trade from 1273 to 1856] (in Faroese). Fróðskaparrit.
