= Fámjin =

Fámjin Famien (Danish)
- Municipality and village
- Fámjin Municipality; Fámjins kommuna (Faroese)
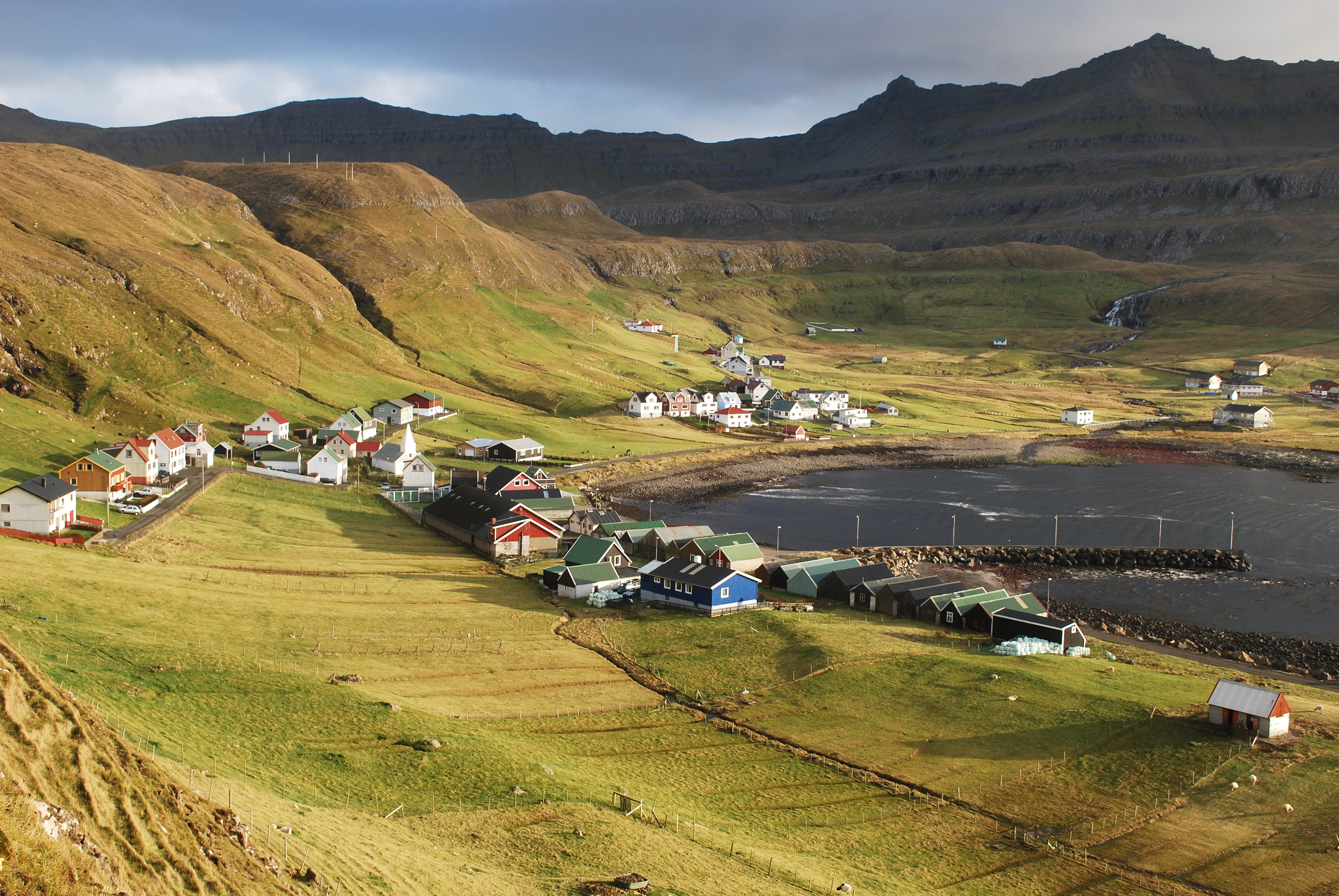
- Fámjin

- Location of Fámjin village in the Faroe Islands
- Coordinates: 61°31′35″N 6°52′37″W
- State: Kingdom of Denmark
- Constituent country: Faroe Islands
- Island: Suðuroy

Population (September 2025)
  - Total: 72
- Time zone: GMT
  - Summer (DST): UTC+1 (WEST)
- Climate: Cfc

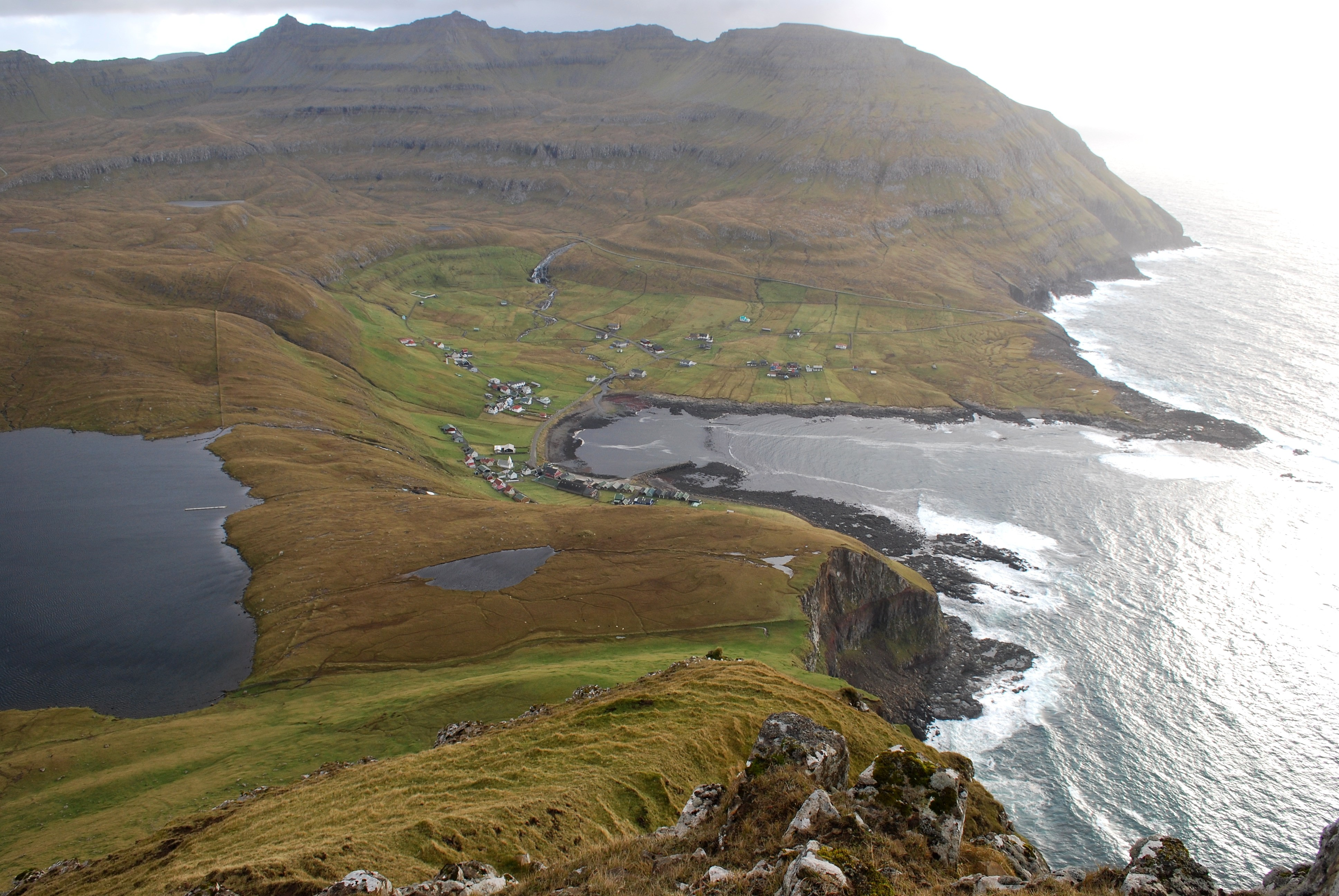
Fámjin and the lake Kirkjuvatn

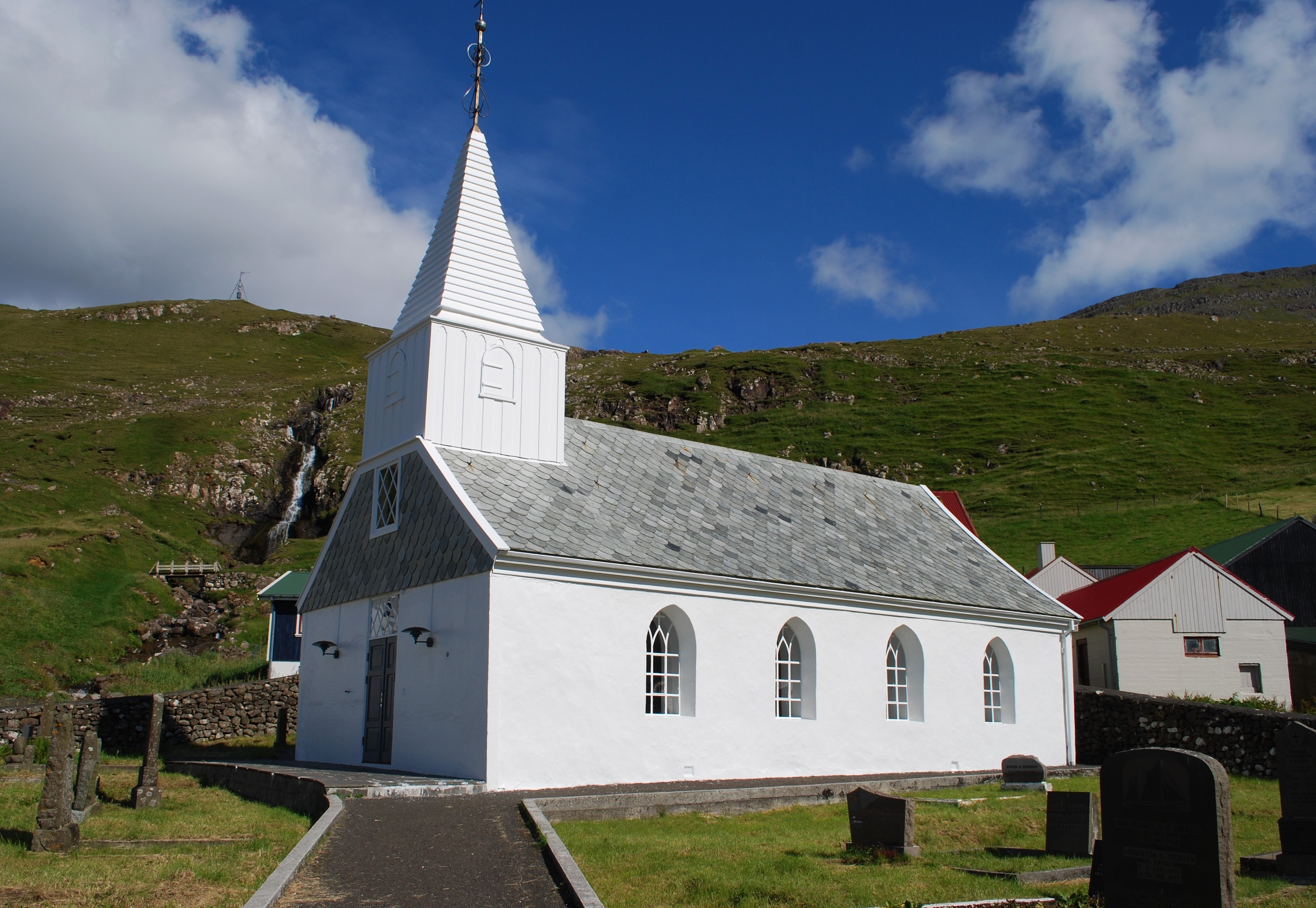
The Church of Fámjin

Fámjin (Danish: Famien) is a village located on the western side of Suðuroy, the southernmost island in Faroe Islands. It looks directly out to the North Atlantic Ocean.

== Name ==
Tradition says that Fámjin used to be called Vesturvik. One day two men from the village were out on the sea fishing from their boat. There they saw a French sailship just lying there waiting for wind. The two men invited two ladies into their boat to see a large halibut. When the ladies were on board the men quickly rowed towards their village with them. From the sail-ship they heard the Frenchmen shout "Femmes ... Femmes". After that day Vesturvik was called Fámjin. These things are said to have happened in the 16th century.

== Geography ==
The village of Fámjin faces the ocean, although partly protected by a stone reef, which becomes visible at low tide. The village is surrounded by some of the highest mountains on Suðuroy. The highest mountain, Gluggarnir is located north of Fámjin. The mountains Borgarknappur and Borgin are south-east of the village. There are several inland lakes and waterfalls. One of the waterfalls is named Fossurin Mikli. Only one road leads to the village, it goes through Øravík.

North of the village lies the “Kirkjuvatn” (Church Lake), one of the largest on the island. The old mountain path between Fámjin and Vágur was originally the main road between the two villages. There are cairns along the path. West of Fámjin by the end of the road is a gorge which is called Prestgjógv (The Priest's Gorge).

Fámjin is 9 km west of Øravík, which is on the west coast. Øravík is located on the east coast, around 3 km south of Krambatangi ferry port. The distance from Fámjin to Tvøroyri is 16 km. The distance from Fámjin to Vágur is 29 km.

== History ==
The church in Fámjin was built in 1875, it was ready to use in 1876. In the church there is a runestone from the 16th century (see Fámjin stone) (Faroese: Fámjinssteinurin). The stone bears both Latin and Runic letters. The stone is dated to the time after the Faroese reformation in 1538, and proves that runes were used up to as late as the 16th century. It is the youngest of the Faroese runestones.

In the church is the prototype of the Faroese flag Merkið. This flag was made by Jens Oliver Lisberg from Fámjin and others while they were studying in Copenhagen in Denmark in 1919. The first time "Merkið" was used in the Faroe Islands, was on June 22, 1919 in Fámjin, the occasion was a wedding. Merkið was not officially recognized in the beginning. However during World War II, the United Kingdom prohibited the use of the flag of Denmark on Faroese ships as Denmark was at that time occupied by Germany. Therefore Merkið was run up on the ships instead. (April 25, 1940 is the official date of recognition) Not until the verification of the home rule act in 1948 was Merkið recognized as the official flag of the Faroe Islands.

== Culture ==
Fámjin is well situated near rich fishing grounds. In the harbor, which is well-protected by the natural environment, the fishing boats moor in the summer at a small wharf. During the winter the boats are pulled in from the quay and kept in boat houses nearby. As in other villages both fishing and sheep farming is a part of the daily routine. The sheep are gathered and led to slaughter in October.

During the summer months, however, the population increases significantly due to the many people from Fámjin who live in other villages on the Faroe Islands and in other countries, but return in the sheep herding and hay season, which takes place from the beginning of July to the end of August. This is the case in many small Faroese villages. The past years the number of tourists who visit the village has been increasing. The tourists come especially for one reason, they wish to see the original Faroese flag, Merkið, which is hanging inside the church. There are some houses for rent and a coffeeshop is next to the harbour. Tourists enjoy also to go for a walk up the hill behind the church to the lake Kirkjuvatn. The name means The Lake of the Church.

== Gallery ==
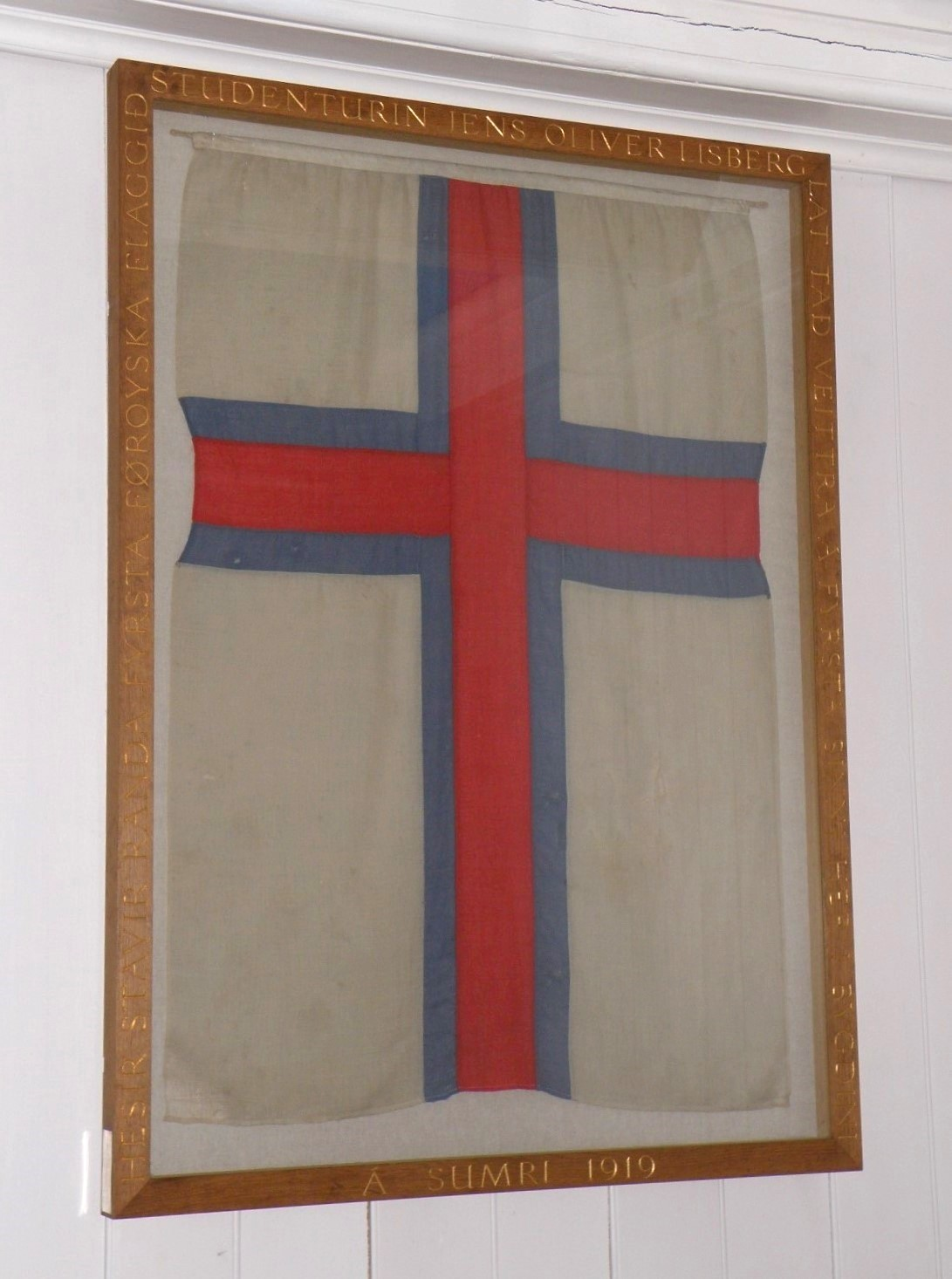
The prototype of the Faroese flag Merkið, which is hanging inside the church

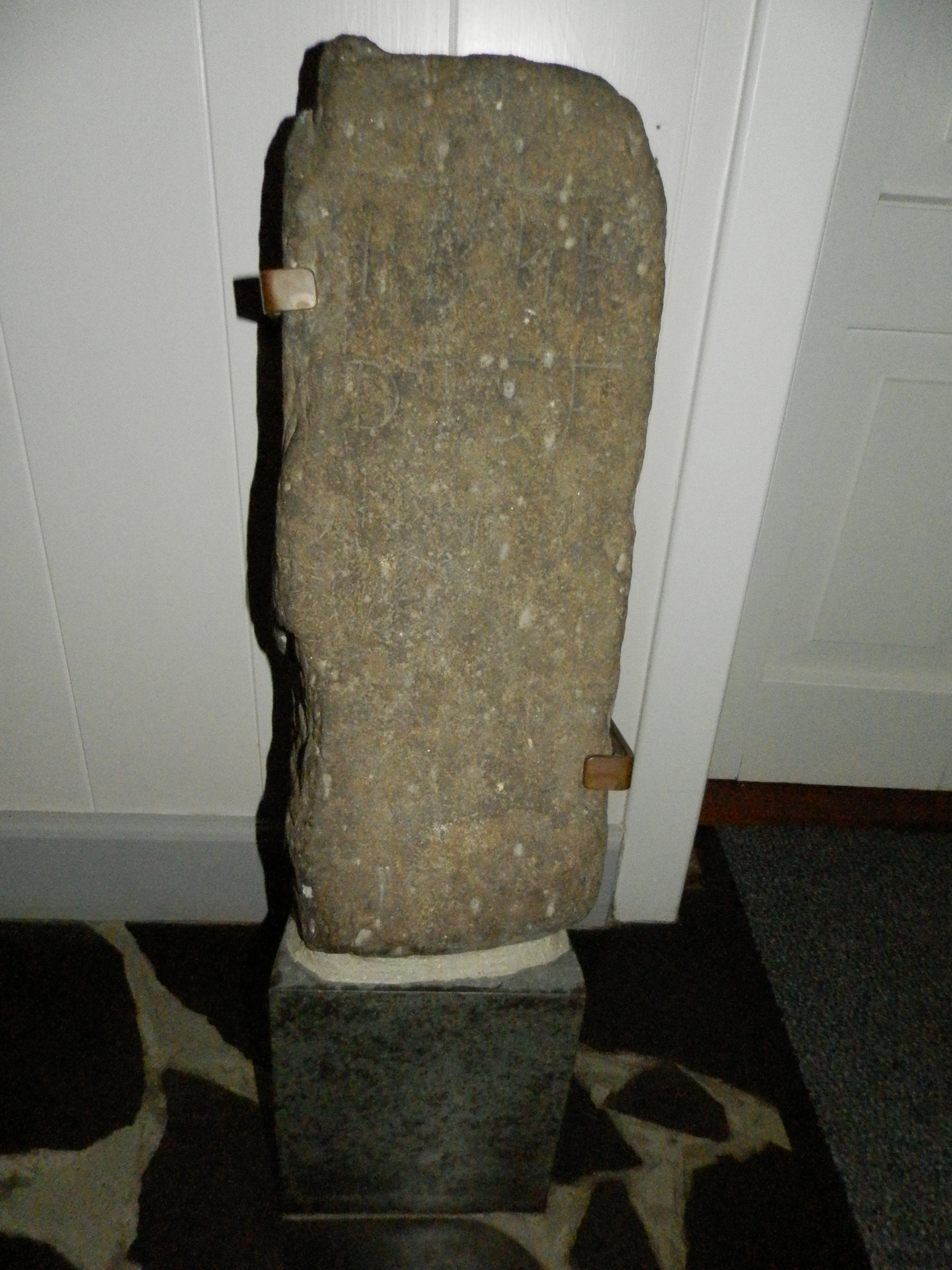
The Fámjin stone is a runestone located in the church of Fámjin

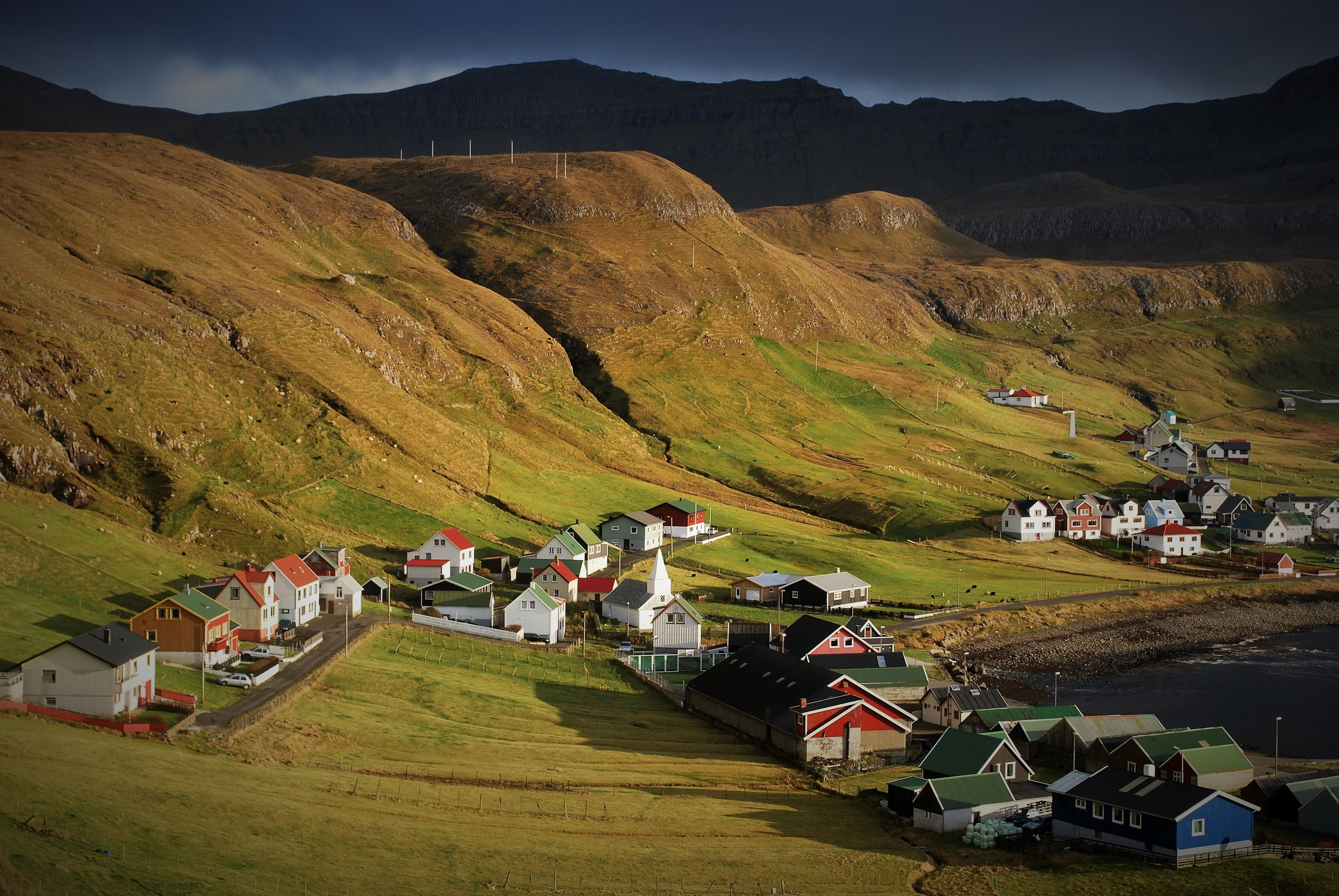
Fámjin and the area around it as seen from north

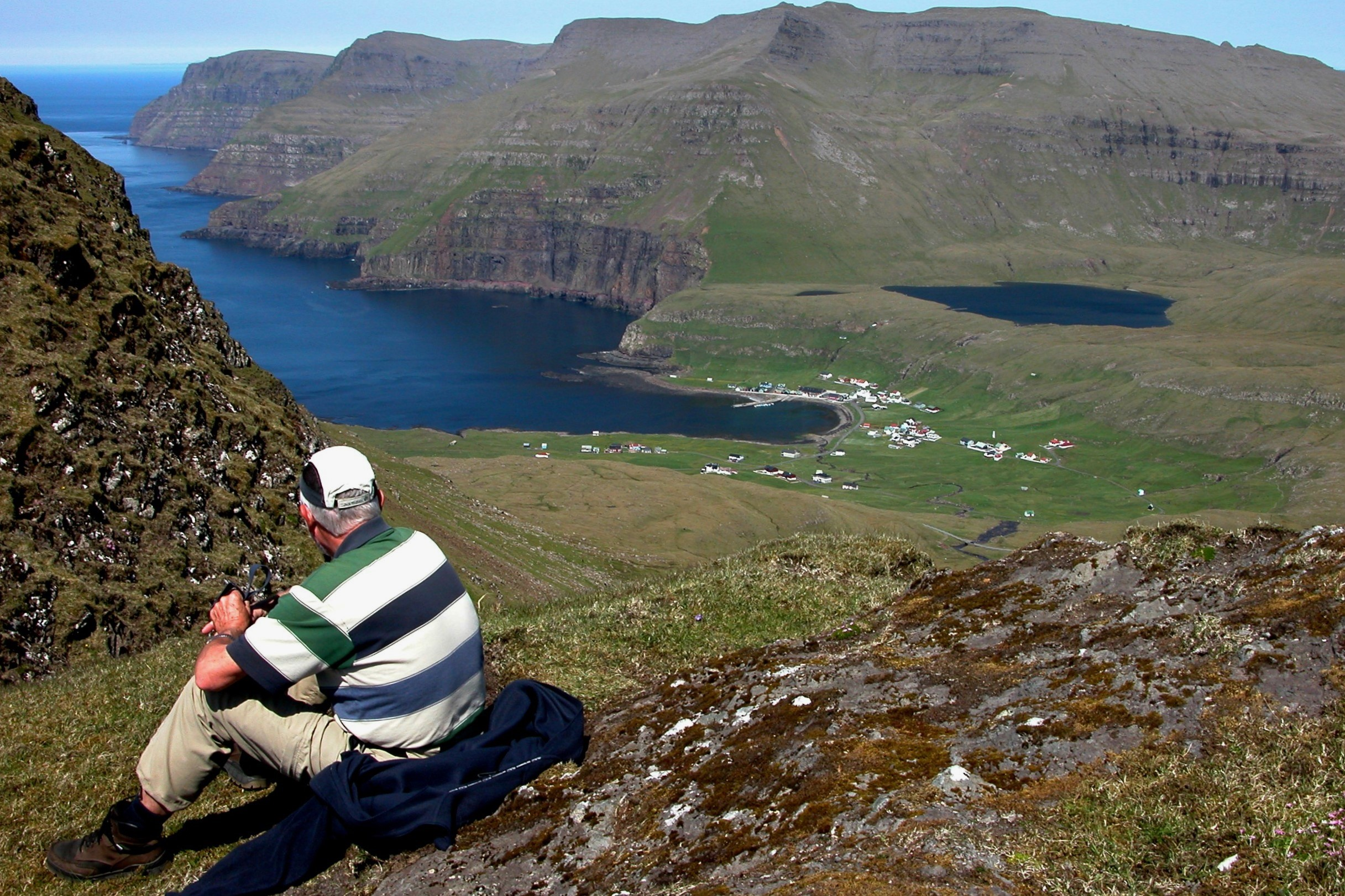
Tourists in the mountains south of Fámjin

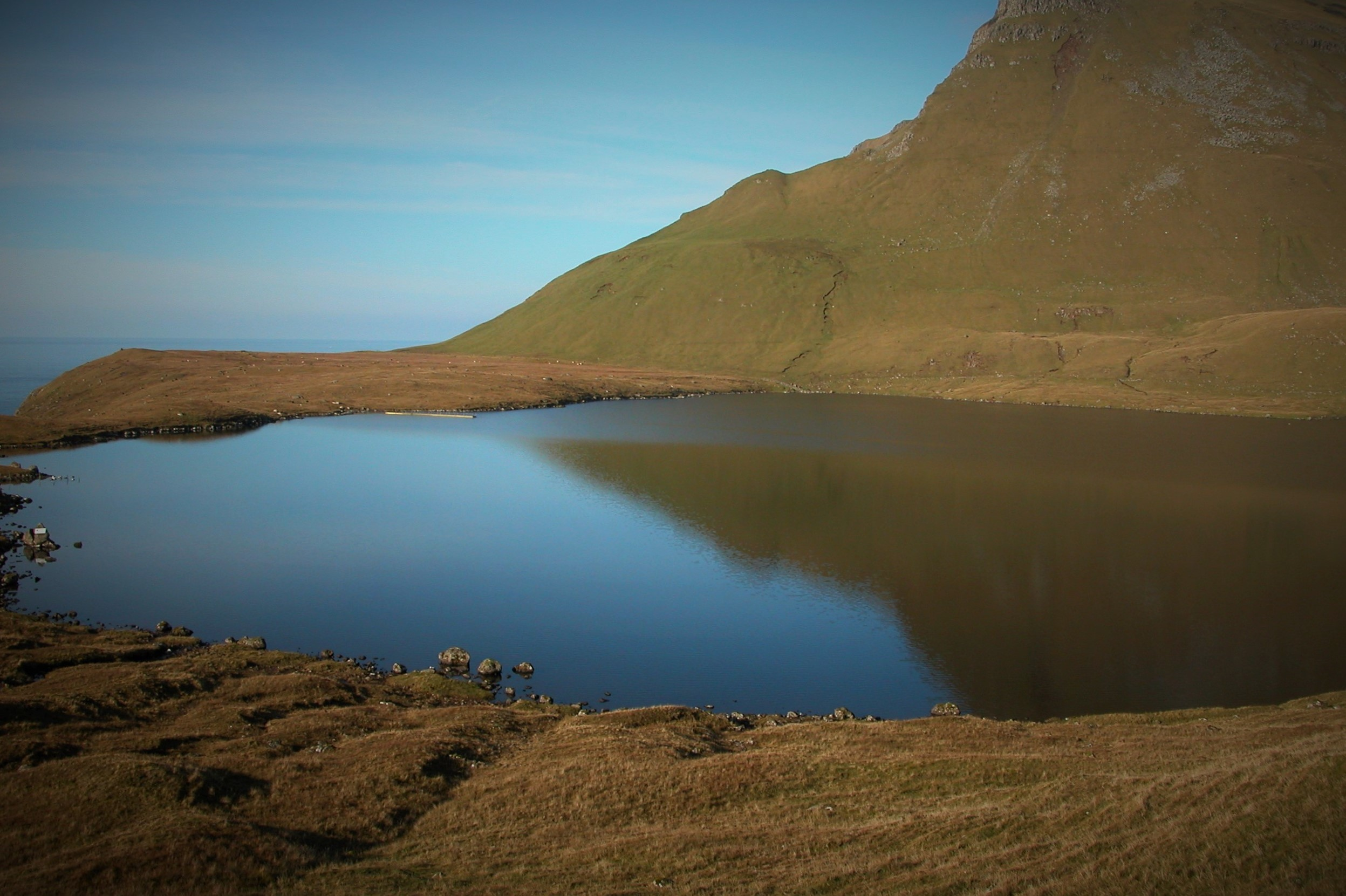
Kirkjuvatn

== See also ==
- List of towns in the Faroe Islands
