= Gluggarnir =

Mountain in the Faroe Islands

Coordinates: 61°33′N 6°52′W

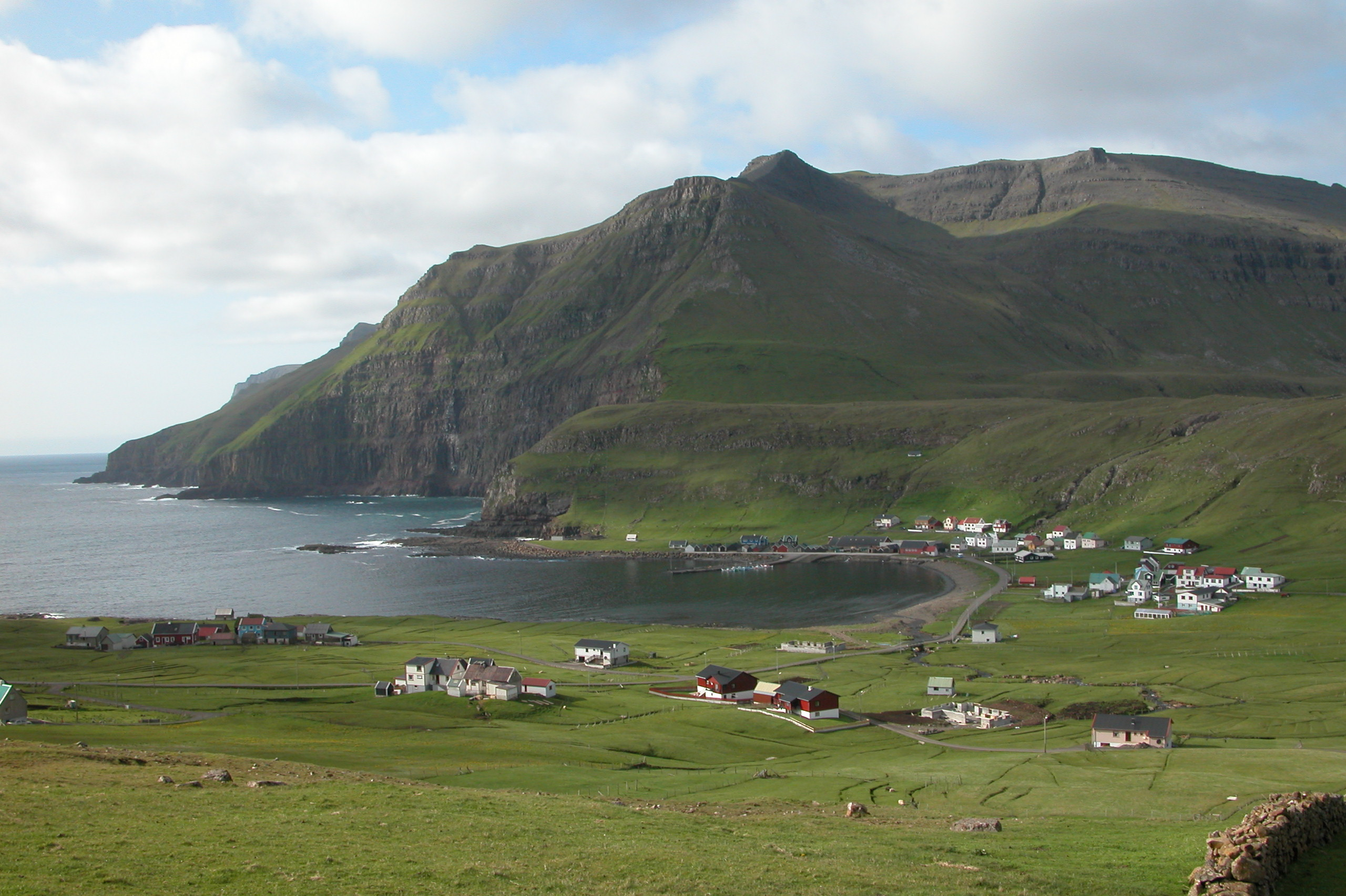
The village of Fámjin on Suðuroy's west coast sits just below Gluggarnir.

Gluggarnir is a mountain in the Faroe Islands. At 610 metres, it is the highest mountain on the southernmost island, Suðuroy. The mountain is located between the villages of Fámjin and Trongisvágur.
