= Kirkjuvatn =

Lake in Suðuroy, Faroe Islands

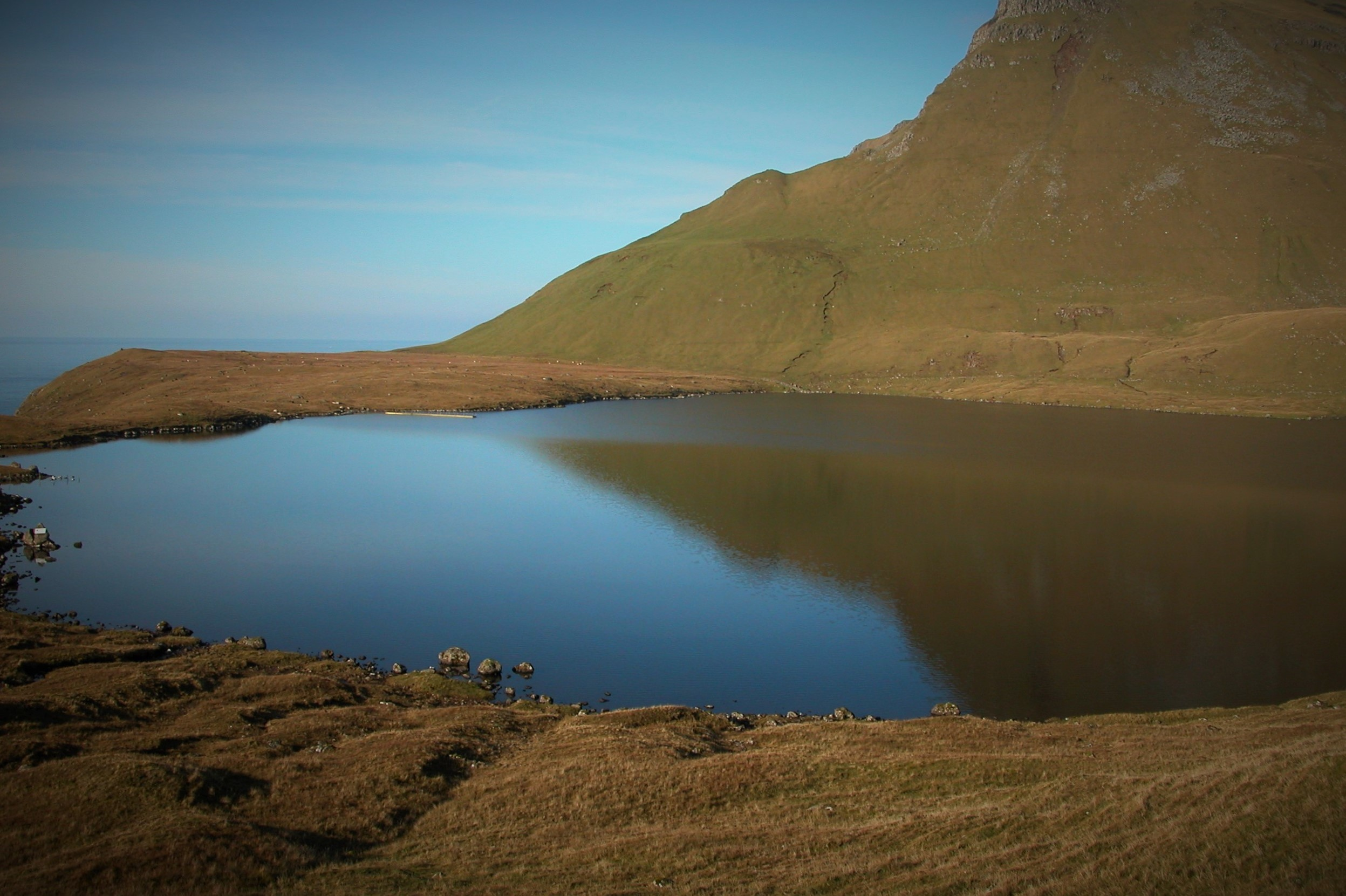

- Location within Denmark Faroe Islands
- Location: Near Fámjin, Suðuroy
- Coordinates: 61°31′35″N 6°52′37″W
- Basin countries: (Faroe Islands)
- Surface area: 20 ha (49 acres)

Kirkjuvatn is a lake in Suðuroy, Faroe Islands. The lake is located just north of the village of Fámjin, which is located on the west coast of Suðuroy. Fámjin is the only village on the island which is facing directly west. Only one other village, Sumba is also located on the west coast, but Sumba is facing south-west. The name of the lake means Church Lake – kirkja means church and vatn means lake in this case, although the most common meaning of the word vatn is water. The lake is 0.2 km^{2}, the largest lake in the island of Suðuroy. The lake is among the 10 largest lakes in the Faroe Islands.

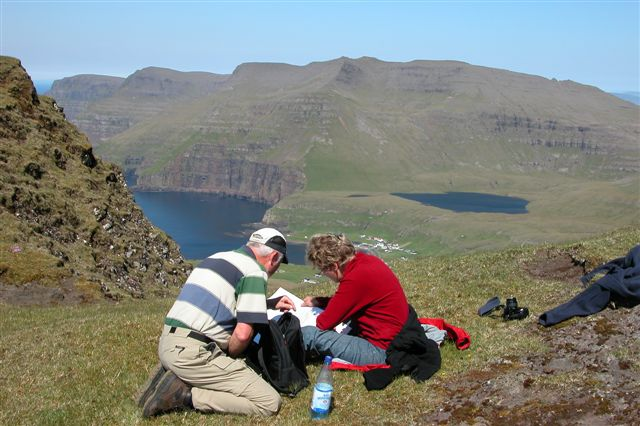
Tourists on a hiking trip south of Fámjin. Kirkjuvatn at right and a part of the village are visible behind them.

== Tourism ==
Kirkjuvatn has become a tourist attraction; tourists often go for a walk from the village to Kirkjuvatn. They can also go fishing to Kirkjuvatn.
