= Jens Oliver Lisberg =

Faroese flag designer (1896–1920)

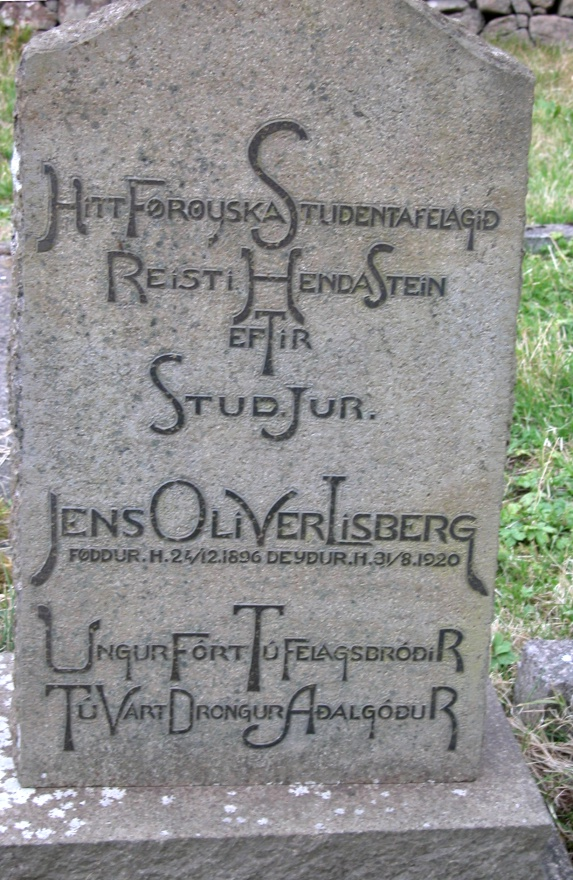
- Lisberg's tombstone in Fámjin
- Born: 24 December 1896; Fámjin, Faroe Islands
- Died: 31 August 1920 (aged 23); Fámjin, Faroe Islands

Jens Oliver Lisberg (24 December 1896 – 31 August 1920) (Jens Olivur Lisberg in modern Faroese) was one of the designers of the Merkið, the flag of the Faroe Islands.

While a law student in Copenhagen, he devised the flag in 1919 with two other Faroese students, Janus Øssursson from Tórshavn and Paul Dahl from Vágur. Lisberg raised the flag for the first time on Faroese soil on 22 June 1919 on returning to his home town of Fámjin. It would not however receive official status until 25 April 1940 when the British occupation government approved its use as the civil ensign of the islands.

Lisberg died of pneumonia on 31 August 1920. He is buried in Fámjin, where the church now holds the original copy of the Merkið.
