= Flag of the Faroe Islands =

Faroe Islands
- Merkið
- Use: National flag and civil ensign
- Proportion: 8:11
- Adopted: 25 April 1940; 86 years ago
- Design: A blue-fimbriated red Nordic cross on a white field
- Designed by: Jens Oliver Lisberg

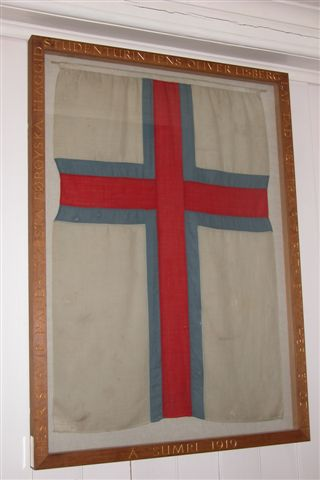
The original flag now hangs in the church of Fámjin

The flag of the Faroe Islands (Faroese: Merkið, lit. 'the banner', pronounced [ˈmɛʃtʃɪ]; Danish: Mærket) is a Nordic cross on a white field, with a red cross fimbriated in blue. It is part of the Nordic cross tradition and is commonly interpreted as a Christian symbol.

The design was created in 1919 by Faroese students in Copenhagen led by Jens Oliver Lisberg, and was first hoisted in the Faroe Islands at Fámjin on 22 June 1919. During the British occupation of the Faroe Islands in World War II, the British authorities recognised Merkið for use by Faroese vessels on 25 April 1940; the date is observed as Flaggdagur (Flag Day). The flag is recognised in the Faroe Islands’ 1948 home-rule settlement, which provides that “a special Faroese flag is recognised”.

== Description and symbolism ==
Merkið is a white Nordic cross flag with a red cross outlined in blue. The cross is offset toward the hoist, in the manner typical of Nordic cross flags. The flag’s construction follows the proportional pattern 6:1:2:1:12 horizontally and 6:1:2:1:6 vertically (the same construction used for the flag of Norway).

The flag’s proportions are set at 8:11 in the Faroese Flag Act, though 5:7 is also commonly encountered in practice.

The colours are often explained with reference to Faroese nature and Nordic ties: white is commonly associated with sea foam and the bright sky, while red and blue appear in traditional Faroese dress and echo the colour schemes of other Nordic flags.

=== Colours ===
The Faroese Flag Act specifies the cross colours as Pantone Matching System shades (red PMS 032 and blue PMS 300). Norden also publishes commonly used digital equivalents.

Scheme	White	Red	Blue
Pantone	Safe	PMS 032	PMS 300
RGB	#FFFFFF	#EF303E	#005EB9

== History ==
The flag was designed in 1919 by Faroese students in Copenhagen, including Jens Oliver Lisberg, Janus Øssursson and Paul Dahl. It was first raised in the Faroe Islands at Fámjin on 22 June 1919. After Denmark was occupied by Germany in 1940, the British authorities in the Faroe Islands recognised Merkið for Faroese shipping on 25 April 1940, to distinguish Faroese vessels from Danish ships. In 1948, the home-rule settlement formally recognised a special Faroese flag and placed rules on its use within Faroese self-government.

The flag of Denmark was used before the Faroese flag became official.

19th-century Faroese flag

Current Faroese flag

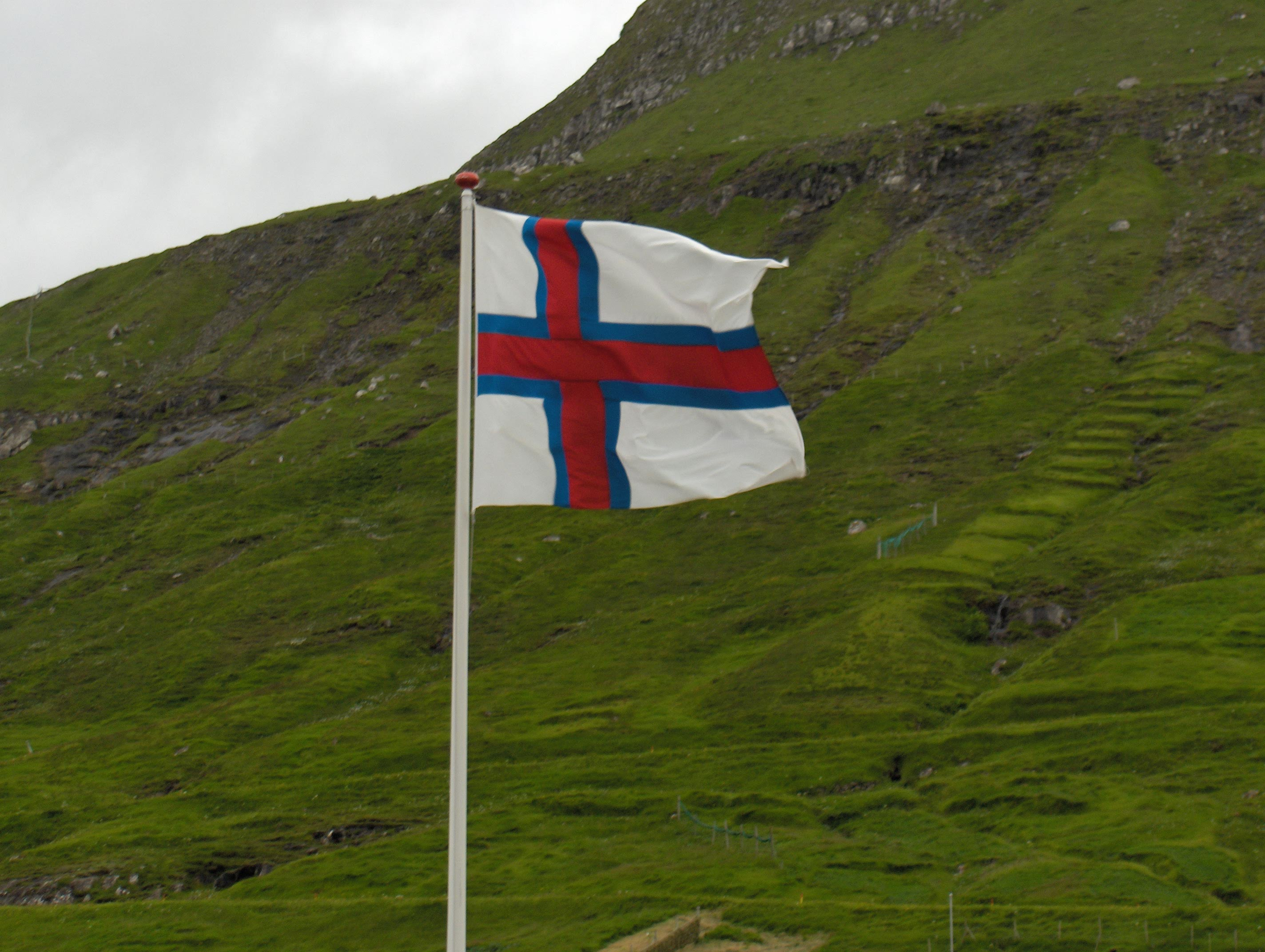
Merkið at Funningur, Eysturoy

== See also ==
- Flag of Denmark
- Flag of Greenland
- List of flags of Denmark
- Nordic Cross flag
- Raven banner
