= 2020 Faroe Islands Cup =

Løgmanssteypið

Tournament details
- Country: Faroe Islands
- Teams: 18

Final positions
- Champions: Havnar Bóltfelag (28th title)
- Runners-up: Víkingur

Tournament statistics
- Matches played: 17
- Goals scored: 50 (2.94 per match)
- Top goal scorer: 5 players (3 goals each)

The 2020 Faroe Islands Cup was the 66th edition of Faroe Islands domestic football cup. It started on 27 June and ended on 5 December. Havnar Bóltfelag were the defending champions, having won their twenty-seventh cup title the previous year and successfully defended their title.

Only the first teams of the participating clubs were allowed to enter the competition.

Locations of the 2020 Faroe Islands Cup teams

== Round and draw dates ==
Round	Draw date	Game date
Preliminary round	15 June 2020	27 June 2020
First round	15 June 2020	8 July 2020
Quarterfinals	14 July 2020	25 November 2020
Semifinals		28–29 November 2020
Final	—	5 December 2020

== Preliminary round ==
27 June 2020	FC Suðuroy (3)	9–1	Royn Hvalba (3)	Á Eiðinum, Vágur
15:00	Lindenskov 18', 57'; Lisberg 23', 29'; A. Poulsen 40', 75', 86'; F. Holm 77'; Pæ. Augustinussen 82'	Report	Ludvig 32'	Attendance: 80; Referee: Kristian Gunnar Joensen

27 June 2020	MB (4)	2–6	Undrið (3)	MB Arena, Miðvágur
15:00	Presttøðni 15' (pen.); J. Joensen 33'	Report	S. Johannesen 7', 30', 81'; Højgaard 35'; Sigurheim 42'; Dam 90'	Attendance: 150; Referee: Stephan Petursson

== First round ==
8 July 2020	TB Tvøroyri (1)	1–0	ÍF (1)	Við Stórá, Trongisvágur
15:30	Gueye 45'	Report		Attendance: 150; Referee: Rúni Gaardbo

8 July 2020	07 Vestur (2)	3–1	FC Suðuroy (3)	Á Dungasandi, Sandavágur
17:30	Tryggvason 21' (o.g.); G. Samuelsen 52', 83'	Report	D. Lisberg 7'	Attendance: 200; Referee: Jákup Mohr

8 July 2020	B68 Toftir (2)	0–2	Víkingur Gøta (1)	Svangaskarð, Toftir
19:00		Report	Justinussen 32'; Jonhardsson 56'	Attendance: 500; Referee: Eiler Rasmussen

8 July 2020	Argja Bóltfelag (1)	4–1	Undrið (3)	Skansi Arena, Argir
19:00	Lofti 43', 88'; Nielsen 74'; Drangastein 78'	Report	Dam 89'	Referee: Jón Þór Baldvinsson

8 July 2020	Skála (1)	4–3	FC Hoyvík (2)	Undir Mýruhjalla, Skála
19:00	P. Jacobsen 18'; A. Danielsen 60'; Hansen 76', 90+1'	Report	Klein 58', 69', 86'	Attendance: 137; Referee: Rúni Olsen

8 July 2020	KÍ (1)	1–1 (a.e.t.) (4–5 p)	Havnar Bóltfelag (1)	Við Djúpumýrar, Klaksvík
19:00	P. Johannesen 70'	Report	Dam 12'	Referee: Petur Reinert
	Penalties
	Danielsen (penalty scored); Došljak (penalty missed); P. Johannesen (penalty scored); Andreasen (penalty scored); Bjartalíð (penalty missed); Olsen (penalty scored); Niclasen (penalty missed)		Schindler (penalty missed); Hansen (penalty missed); Johansen (penalty scored); Nygaard (penalty scored); Gestsson (penalty scored); Jakobsen (penalty scored); Soylu (penalty scored)

8 July 2020	EB/Streymur (1)	1–1 (a.e.t.) (3–5 p)	NSÍ Runavík (1)	Við Margáir, Streymnes
19:00	T. Olsen 29'	Report	P. Knudsen 49'	Attendance: 300; Referee: Jóhan Hendrik Ellefsen
	Penalties
	Danielsen (penalty missed); Djurhuus (penalty scored); A. Olsen (penalty scored); Á. Olsen (penalty scored)		Benjaminsen (penalty scored); Olsen (penalty scored); J. Mortensen (penalty scored); A. Knudsen (penalty scored); Nielsen (penalty scored)

8 July 2020	B71 Sandoy (2)	2–7	B36 Tórshavn (1)	Inni í Dal, Sandur
19:15	Okpala 17'; Mohammed 85'	Report	Radosavljevic 4', 78', 87'; M. Agnarsson 40'; Á. Frederiksberg 61', 72'; H. Agnarsson 80'	Attendance: 200; Referee: Bjarki Danielsen

== Quarter-finals ==
25 November 2020	Víkingur Gøta (1)	1–0	TB Tvøroyri (1)	Sarpugerði, Norðragøta
17:00	Vatnhamar 85'	Report

25 November 2020	07 Vestur (2)	1–1 (4–5 p)	Havnar Bóltfelag (1)	Á Dungasandi, Sandavágur
19:00	Weihe 78'	Report	Nygaard 7'
	Penalties
	Jeremic (penalty missed); Egilsson (penalty scored); Steig (penalty scored); Tausen (penalty scored); Vujovic (penalty scored)		(penalty scored) Nygaard; (penalty scored) Dalbúð; (penalty scored) Justinussen; (penalty scored) Gestsson; (penalty scored) Johansen

25 November 2020	B36 Tórshavn (1)	3–0	Argja Bóltfelag (1)	Gundadalur, Tórshavn
19:00	Pingel 3'; Przybylski 6'; Johansen 44'	Report

25 November 2020	NSÍ Runavík (1)	1–0	Skála (1)	við Løkin, Runavík
19:00	Knudsen 75'	Report

== Semi-finals ==
28 November 2020	Víkingur Gøta (1)	2–1	B36 Tórshavn (1)	Sarpugerði, Norðragøta

29 November 2020	NSÍ Runavík (1)	1–3	Havnar Bóltfelag (1)	við Løkin, Runavík

== Final ==
5 December 2020
16:00

Víkingur Gøta (1)	0–2	Havnar Bóltfelag (1)
	Report	G. Vatnhamar 24' (o.g.); Mads Boe Mikkelsen 56'

Tórsvøllur, Tórshavn
Attendance: 1,100
Referee: Jóhan Hendrik Ellefsen

== See also ==
- 2020 Faroe Islands Premier League
- 2020 1. deild
- 2020 2. deild
