= 2014 Faroe Islands Cup =

2014 Faroe Islands Cup vy Ærvur Isfeld
Løgmanssteypið

Tournament details
- Country: Faroe Islands
- Teams: 18

Final positions
- Champions: Víkingur Gøta (4th title)
- Runners-up: Havnar Bóltfelag

Tournament statistics
- Matches played: 19
- Goals scored: 82 (4.32 per match)
- Top goal scorer: (Brazil) Clayton Nascimento (8 goals)

The 2014 Faroe Islands Cup was the 60th edition of Faroe Islands domestic football cup. It started on 15 March and ended with the final on 30 August 2014. Víkingur were the defending champions, having won their third cup title the previous year, and successfully defended their title. As the winner of the competition, they qualified for the first qualifying round of the 2015–16 UEFA Europa League.

Only the first teams of Faroese football clubs were allowed to participate. The preliminary round involved only clubs from 2. deild and 3. deild. Teams from 1. deild and Effodeildin entered the competition in the first round.

== Participating clubs ==
2014 Effodeildin 10 teams	2014 1. deild 3 teams	2014 2. deild 4 teams	2014 3. deild 1 team
AB; B36; B68; EB/Streymur; HB; ÍF; KÍ; NSÍ; Skála; Víkingur ^{TH}	07 Vestur; FC Suðuroy; TB	B71; Giza Hoyvík; MB; Undrið	Royn

^{TH} – Title Holders

== Round and draw dates ==
Round	Draw date	Game date
Preliminary round	3 March	15 March
First round	3 March	5–6 April
Quarterfinals	7 April	27 April, 14 May
Semifinals	28 April	21 May, 5 & 18 June
Final	—	30 August 2014 at Tórsvøllur, Tórshavn

Source: Competition calendar at the FSF website

== Preliminary round ==
The four clubs from 2. deild entered this round. The draw was made on 3 March and the matches took place on 15 March.

Team 1	Score	Team 2
Undrið FF	2–1	MB
Giza Hoyvík	2–0	B71

=== Results ===
15 March 2014
12:30 WET

Undrið FF	2 − 1	MB
Mohr 37'; Absalonsen 64'	Report	Selfoss 15'; Rasmussen (red card) 90'; Heinason (yellow card) 65' (red card) 90'

Gundadalur (niðari vøllur), Tórshavn
Attendance: 20
Referee: Ragnar Joensen

15 March 2014
17:15 WET

Giza Hoyvík	2 − 0	B71
Eyðunsson 22'; Hermansen 67'	Report

Gundadalur (niðari vøllur), Tórshavn
Attendance: 50
Referee: Ottar í Funningsstovu

== First round ==
All ten clubs from Effodeildin, three from 1. deild, one from 3. deild and the two winners of Preliminary round entered this round. The matches were played on 5 and 6 April.

Team 1	Score	Team 2
FC Suðuroy	0–4	NSÍ
Víkingur	2–0	Skála
AB	1–1 (a.e.t.) 3–1 (p)	TB
HB	3–2	B36
ÍF	14–1	Undrið FF
Giza Hoyvík	1–6	EB/Streymur
KÍ	5–0	07 Vestur
B68	8–0	Royn

=== Results ===
5 April 2014
15:00 WEST

FC Suðuroy	0 – 4	NSÍ
	Report	Joensen 33', 45'; Frederiksberg 88' (pen.); Gaardbo 90+2'

Á Eiðinum, Vágur
Attendance: 100
Referee: Rói Jacobsen

5 April 2014
15:00 WEST

Víkingur	2 – 0	Skála
Jacobsen 13' (o.g.); Justinussen 32'	Report

Sarpugerði, Norðragøta
Referee: Páll Augustinussen

5 April 2014
15:00 WEST

AB	1 – 1 (a.e.t.)	TB
Højgaard 67'	Report	R. Tausen 87'
Penalties
Højgaard (penalty scored); Olsen (penalty scored); Stenberg (penalty missed); Draganstein (penalty scored)	3 – 1	M. Tausen (penalty missed); R. Tausen (penalty scored); Joensen (penalty missed); Mortensen (penalty missed)

Blue Water Arena, Argir
Referee: Ransin N. Djurhuus

5 April 2014
16:00 WEST

B68	8 – 0	Royn
Olsen 20', 35', 42'; Andreassen 32'; Edmundsson 45'; Johannesen 62'; Ronaldsson 71' á Líknargøtu 73'	Report

Svangaskarð, Toftir
Attendance: 100
Referee: Bent Tommy Linklett

5 April 2014
17:00 WEST

Giza Hoyvík	1 – 6	EB/Streymur
Egholm 79'	Report	Danielsen 3'; Hansen 51', 84', 90'; Dam 58' (o.g.); Niclasen 78'

Gundadalur (niðari vøllur), Tórshavn
Attendance: 200
Referee: Johan Petur Michelsen

5 April 2014
17:00 WEST

KÍ	5 – 0	07 Vestur
Guéye 12'; Mikkelsen 41' (o.g.); Simonsen 76'; Elttør 88' á Lakjuni 90+3'	Report

Við Djúpumýrar, Klaksvík
Attendance: 400
Referee: Eiler Rasmussen

5 April 2014
18:00 WEST

ÍF	14 – 1	Undrið FF
Jakobsen 6', 10'; Clayton 7', 14', 50', 65', 66', 88'; K. Løkin 12', 36'; B. Petersen 41'; Høgnesen 47' (o.g.); P. M. Petersen 52', 69'	Report	Christiansen 61'

Í Fløtugerði, Fuglafjørður
Attendance: 150
Referee: Rúni Gaardbo

6 April 2014
15:00 WEST

HB	3 – 2	B36
Benjaminsen 14'; Holm 45'; Vatnsdal 47'	Report	Lawal 79'; Sørensen 82'; Nielsen (yellow card) 62' (red card) 83'

Gundadalur, Tórshavn
Attendance: 450
Referee: Dagfinn Forná

== Quarter-finals ==
The draw was made on 7 April. The matches were played on 27 April and 7 May.

Team 1	Score	Team 2
Víkingur	3–0	KÍ
AB	0–2	HB
EB/Streymur	4–3 (a.e.t.)	NSÍ
B68	4–3	ÍF

=== Results ===
27 April 2014
16:00 WEST

Víkingur	3 – 0	KÍ
Justinussen 8', 90+2'; Jacobsen 49'	Report

Sarpugerði, Norðragøta
Attendance: 400
Referee: Lars Müller

27 April 2014
16:00 WEST

AB	0 – 2	HB
	Report	Vatnsdal 17' av Fløtum 81'

Blue Water Arena, Argir
Attendance: 500
Referee: Rúni Gaardbo

27 April 2014
16:00 WEST

EB/Streymur	4 – 3 (a.e.t.)	NSÍ
Danielsen 79'; Hansen 81', 89', 95'	Report	Frederiksberg 22'; Olsen 45', 66'

Við Margáir, Streymnes
Referee: Petur Reinert

14 May 2014 (Note: The match was originally scheduled to be played on 27 April 2014, 17:00 local time, but was postponed to 7 May. And postponed again to 14 May.)
19:00 WEST

B68	4 – 3	ÍF
Eliasen 18' (o.g.); Edmundsson 20'; Rosenberg 26'; Mikkelsen 75' (o.g.)	Report	Clayton 24', 86'; Poulsen 56'

Svangaskarð, Toftir
Attendance: 200
Referee: Ransin N. Djurhuus

== Semi-finals ==
The draw was made on 28 April. The matches were played over two legs on 21 May, 5 and 18 June.

Team 1	Agg.	Team 2	1st leg	2nd leg
B68	0–2	HB	0–1	0–1
Víkingur	4–3	EB/Streymur	4–1	0–2

=== First legs ===
21 May 2014 (Note: The first leg of the semi-finals were originally to be played on 21 May 2014, but were postponed to 4 and 5 June. Later, this match was rescheduled to 21 May.)
19:00 WEST

Víkingur	4 – 1	EB/Streymur
Olsen 34' (pen.), 62'; Hansson 56'; Djordjević 90'	Report	Danielsen 68'

Sarpugerði, Norðragøta
Attendance: 400
Referee: Eiler Rasmussen

5 June 2014
19:00 WEST

B68	0 – 1	HB
	Report	Hanssen 57'

Svangaskarð, Toftir
Attendance: 300
Referee: Petur Reinert

=== Second legs ===
18 June 2014
18:00 WEST

HB	1 – 0	B68
Joensen 51'	Report

Gundadalur, Tórshavn
Attendance: 500
Referee: Lars Müller

18 June 2014
19:00 WEST

EB/Streymur	2 – 0	Víkingur
Turi 5' (o.g.); Samuelsen 65'	Report

Við Margáir, Streymnes
Referee: Ransin N. Djurhuus

== Final ==
30 August 2014
19:45 WEST

HB	0 – 1	Víkingur
dos Santos (red card) 90+5'	Report	Hansson 89'

Tórsvøllur, Tórshavn
Attendance: 2,870
Referee: Lars Müller

== Top goalscorers ==
Rank	Player	Team	Goals
1	(Brazil) Clayton Nascimento	ÍF	8
2	(Faroe Islands) Arnbjørn Hansen	EB/Streymur	6
3	(Faroe Islands) Niels Pauli Danielsen	EB/Streymur	3
3	(Faroe Islands) Óli Højgaard Olsen	B68	3
3	(Faroe Islands) Finnur Justinussen	Víkingur	3
