= 2020 Faroe Islands Premier League =

Faroe Islands Premier League
- Season: 2020
- Dates: 9 May – 7 November 2020
- Champions: HB
- Relegated: Skála ÍF; Argja Bóltfelag
- Champions League: HB
- Europa Conference League: NSÍ; KÍ
- Matches: 135
- Goals: 451 (3.34 per match)
- Top goalscorer: Uroš Stojanov; Klæmint Olsen (17 goals)
- Biggest home win: HB 11–0 AB (12 August 2020)
- Biggest away win: EB/Streymur 0–7 KÍ (6 August 2020)
- Highest scoring: HB 11–0 AB (12 August 2020)
- All statistics correct as of 20 November 2020.

The 2020 Faroe Islands Premier League (referred to as Betri deildin menn for sponsorship reasons) was the 78th season of top-tier football in the Faroe Islands, and the 16th under the current format.

KÍ were the defending champions, having won their 18th Faroese title in the previous season. The season was scheduled to start on 8 March and later postponed to 15 March, because of the outbreak of coronavirus in the Faroe Islands. The season started on 9 May 2020 and ended on 7 November 2020. This was decided after there had been no reported case of COVID-19 in the Faroe Islands from 6 April to 18 April. There has been no deaths due to COVID-19 in the Faroe Islands as of 8 November 2020.

The Norwegian TV2 broadcast matches from the first 12 rounds.

Havnar Bóltfelag (HB) won their 24th championship with 69 points.

Skála were relegated and AB played against B68 Toftir to decide if AB would be relegated or not. The winner of the match won the right to play in the top league in the 2021 season. The match was played on 29 November 2020. AB lost the match 2-3 (1-1 after 90 minutes) after extra time, and was relegated. B68 won promotion to 2021 Faroe Islands Premier League. Andri Benjaminsen, the 20-year-old younger brother of record player of the Faroe Islands national football team Fróði Benjaminsen scored a hat trick.

== Teams ==
Locations of the 2020 Betri deidin menn teams

Last season, there was no relegation, as three backup teams finished in the top three in 1. deild.

Team	City	Stadium	Capacity
Argja Bóltfelag	Argir	Skansi Arena	2,000
B36 Tórshavn	Tórshavn	Gundadalur	5,000
EB/Streymur	Streymnes	Við Margáir	2,000
Havnar Bóltfelag	Tórshavn	Gundadalur	5,000
Ítróttarfelag Fuglafjarðar	Fuglafjørður	Í Fløtugerði	3,000
Klaksvíkar Ítróttarfelag	Klaksvík	Við Djúpumýrar	4,000
NSÍ Runavík	Runavík	Við Løkin	2,000
Skála ÍF	Skála	Undir Mýruhjalla	1,500
Tvøroyrar Bóltfelag	Tvøroyri	Við Stórá	4,000
Víkingur Gøta	Norðragøta	Sarpugerði	3,000

== League table ==
Pos	Team	Pld	W	D	L	GF	GA	GD	Pts	Qualification or relegation
1	Havnar Bóltfelag (C)	27	22	3	2	81	23	+58	69	Qualification for the Champions League preliminary round
2	NSÍ Runavík	27	20	3	4	58	26	+32	63	Qualification for the Europa Conference League first qualifying round
3	KÍ	27	19	5	3	72	25	+47	62	Qualification for the Europa Conference League first qualifying round
4	B36 Tórshavn	27	19	2	6	77	37	+40	59	
5	Víkingur	27	15	2	10	55	44	+11	47	
6	ÍF	27	7	5	15	34	59	−25	26	
7	EB/Streymur	27	7	3	17	26	65	−39	24	
8	TB Tvøroyri	27	4	6	17	20	42	−22	18	
9	Argja Bóltfelag (R)	27	1	7	19	21	73	−52	10	Qualification for the Faroe Islands Premier League play-off
10	Skála (R)	27	1	4	22	22	72	−50	7	Relegation to the 1. deild

Source: Faroe Soccer (in Faroese)
Rules for classification: 1) Points; 2) Goal difference; 3) Goals scored.
(C) Champions; (R) Relegated

== Fixtures and results ==
Each team plays three times (either twice at home and once away or once at home and twice away) against each other team for a total of 27 matches each.

=== Rounds 1–18 ===
Home \ Away	AB	B36	EBS	HAV	KÍ	NSÍ	SKÁ	TB	VÍK	ÍF
Argja Bóltfelag		0–4	1–1	0–5	0–6	2–3	1–1	0–0	0–0	2–2
B36 Tórshavn	3–0		4–1	2–4	6–2	1–1	6–2	4–1	4–2	2–0
EB/Streymur	3–1	0–3		0–2	0–7	0–3	1–0	2–0	0–2	1–0
Havnar Bóltfelag	11–0	2–0	1–0		3–3	2–0	3–0	4–1	3–0	4–2
KÍ	2–0	0–2	3–0	2–1		1–1	3–0	2–1	4–1	6–0
NSÍ Runavík	3–0	4–2	1–0	2–0	0–2		1–0	3–1	1–2	5–0
Skála	1–1	1–3	1–3	1–3	0–6	0–4		0–2	0–4	1–2
TB Tvøroyri	1–1	1–3	0–1	0–1	1–2	0–1	1–0		1–2	0–0
Víkingur	2–1	4–2	6–0	1–3	1–2	1–0	5–2	0–0		1–2
ÍF	4–2	0–3	2–1	1–2	1–4	0–1	3–0	1–0	1–2	

Source: (in Faroese)
Legend: Blue = home team win; Yellow = draw; Red = away team win.

=== Rounds 18–27 ===
Home \ Away	AB	B36	EBS	HAV	KÍ	NSÍ	SKÁ	TB	VÍK	ÍF
Argja Bóltfelag			4–0	2–3		1–2		0–3		
B36 Tórshavn	3–0			1–2		3–4		2–0		
EB/Streymur		2–6		1–5			1–1	3–2	2–3	
Havnar Bóltfelag						2–2	3–0	4–0	4–0	
KÍ	3–1	1–1	2–1	1–1						4–1
NSÍ Runavík			4–1		1–0		4–1		3–2	
Skála	2–0	1–2			0–1					4–4
TB Tvøroyri					0–0	0–1	3–2		0–2	1–1
Víkingur	4–1	1–3			1–3		2–1			4–1
ÍF	1–0	1–2	1–1	1–3		2–3				

Source: (in Faroese)
Legend: Blue = home team win; Yellow = draw; Red = away team win.

== Faroe Islands Premier League play-off ==
The ninth-placed team (Argja Bóltfelag) faced the fourth-placed team of the 2020 1. deild (B68 Toftir) for the final place in the 2021 Faroe Islands Premier League.

29 November 2020	Argja Bóltfelag	2–3	B68 Toftir	Argir
10:30 BST				Stadium: Skansi Arena

== Top goalscorers ==
As of match(es) played 7 November 2020

Rank	Goalscorer	Team	Goals
1	(Faroe Islands) Klæmint Olsen	NSÍ Runavík	17
1	(Serbia) Uroš Stojanov	ÍF	17
3	(Faroe Islands) Petur Knudsen	NSÍ Runavík	16
4	(Faroe Islands) Jóannes Bjartalíð	KÍ	15
5	(Denmark) Mikkel Dahl	HB Tórshavn	14
6	(Faroe Islands) Finnur Justinussen	Víkingur	13
6	(Denmark) Sebastian Pingel	B36 Tórshavn	13
8	(Faroe Islands) Adrian Justinussen	HB Tórshavn	12
8	(Faroe Islands) Hilmar Leon Jakobsen	HB Tórshavn	12
8	(Faroe Islands) Páll Klettskarð	KÍ	12
8	(Faroe Islands) Sølvi Vatnhamar	Víkingur	12

== See also ==
- 2020 Faroe Islands Cup
- 2020 1. deild
- 2020 2. deild
