= 2016 Faroe Islands Cup =

Løgmanssteypið

Tournament details
- Country: Faroe Islands
- Teams: 18

Final positions
- Champions: KÍ (6th title)
- Runners-up: Víkingur

Tournament statistics
- Matches played: 19
- Goals scored: 69 (3.63 per match)
- Top goal scorer: (Faroe Islands) Jóannes Bjartalíð (5 goals)

The 2016 Faroe Islands Cup was the 62nd edition of Faroe Islands domestic football cup. The competition started on 24 March and will end on 27 August. Víkingur are the defending champions, having won their fifth cup title the previous year. The winner of competition will qualify for the first qualifying round of the 2017–18 UEFA Europa League.

Only the first teams of Faroese football clubs were allowed to participate. The preliminary round involves clubs from 1. deild, 2. deild and one team from 3. deild. The remaining teams from 1. deild and all of the Effodeildin enter the competition in the first round.

== Participating clubs ==
2016 Effodeildin 10 teams	2016 1. deild 5 teams	2015 2. deild 2 teams	2015 3. deild 1 team
AB; B36; B68; HB; ÍF; KÍ; NSÍ; Skála; TB; Víkingur ^{TH}	07 Vestur; FC Suðuroy; B71; EB/Streymur; Giza Hoyvík	MB; Royn	Undrið

^{TH} – Title Holders

== Round and draw dates ==
Round	Draw date	Game date
Preliminary round	22 February	24–26 March
First round	22 February	23–24 April
Quarterfinals	25 April	7–8 May
Semifinals	9 May	25–26 May & 15 June
Final	—	27 August 2016 at Tórsvøllur, Tórshavn

== Preliminary round ==
Two clubs from 2. deild and one each from 1. deild and 3. deild entered this round. The matches took place on 24 and 26 March.

Team 1	Score	Team 2
MB (3)	0–2	Undrið (4)
FC Suðuroy (2)	4–2	Royn (3)

== First round ==
All ten clubs from the Effodeildin, four from 1. deild and the two winners of Preliminary round entered this round.

Team 1	Score	Team 2
Undrið (4)	0–6	Skála (1)
AB (1)	1–2	B36 (1)
ÍF (1)	0–4	KÍ (1)
EB/Streymur (2)	2–1	07 Vestur (2)
Giza Hoyvík (1)	2–0	B68 (1)
HB (1)	9–1	B71 (2)
TB (1)	1–2	NSÍ (1)
FC Suðuroy (2)	2–3	Víkingur (1)

== Quarter-finals ==
Team 1	Score	Team 2
KÍ (1)	2–1	B36 (1)
EB/Streymur (2)	0–2	NSÍ (1)
Skála (1)	2–1	Giza Hoyvík (1)
HB (1)	3–4	Víkingur (1)

== Semi-finals ==
Team 1	Agg.	Team 2	1st leg	2nd leg
KÍ	4–1	NSÍ	4–1	0–0
Skála	1–2	Víkingur	0–1	1–1

== Final ==
27 August 2016
18:00 WEST

KÍ	1–1 (a.e.t.)	Víkingur
Gregersen 14' (o.g.)	Report	A. Olsen 31'
Penalties
Bjartalíð (penalty scored); Andreassen (penalty scored); Klettskarð (penalty scored); Danielsen (penalty scored); S. Olsen (penalty scored)	5–3	(penalty scored) Gregersen; (penalty scored) Jarnskor; (penalty missed) E. Jacobsen; (penalty scored) H. Jacobsen

Tórsvøllur, Tórshavn
Attendance: 4,652
Referee: Alex Troleis

== Top goalscorers ==
Rank	Player	Team	Goals
1	(Faroe Islands) Jóannes Bjartalíð	KÍ	5
2	(Faroe Islands) Øssur Dalbúð	HB	4
3	(Faroe Islands) Ari Olsen	HB	3
3	(Faroe Islands) Brian Jacobsen	Skála	3
3	(Faroe Islands) Sølvi Vatnhamar	Víkingur	3
