= 2023 1. deild =

1. delid
- Season: 2023
- Dates: 4 March 2023 – 28 October 2023
- Champions: Skála
- Promoted: NSÍ Runavík; Skála
- Relegated: B68 Toftir II; EB/Streymur II

The 2023 1. deild was the 81st edition of second-tier football in the Faroe Islands.

The winners (Skála) and runners-up (NSÍ Runavík) were promoted to the 2024 Faroe Islands Premier League. The bottom two teams (B68 Toftir II and EB/Streymur II) were relegated to the 2024 2. deild.

== Teams ==
=== Team changes ===
Promoted from 2022 2. deild	Promoted to 2022 Faroe Islands Premier League	Relegated from 2022 Faroe Islands Premier League	Relegated to 2023 2. deild
B68 Toftir II; EB/Streymur II; Hoyvík	ÍF; TB Tvøroyri	NSÍ Runavík; Skála	07 Vestur II; NSÍ Runavík II; Undrið

B68 Toftir II won the 2022 2. deild title to earn promotion, joined by third-placed EB/Streymur II and sixth-placed Hoyvík. They replaced the 2022 1. delid bottom two teams (07 Vestur II and NSÍ Runavík II), and sixth-placed Undrið (who withdrew from the league). NSÍ Runavík and Skála were relegated to the league from the 2022 Faroe Islands Premier League, replacing ÍF and TB Tvøroyri (who were promoted and replaced them).

=== Stadia ===
Team	City
B36 Tórshavn II	Tórshavn
B68 Toftir II	Toftir
B71 Sandoy	Sandur
EB/Streymur II	Streymnes
HB II	Tórshavn
Hoyvík	Hoyvík
KÍ II	Klaksvík
NSÍ Runavík	Runavík
Skála	Skála
Víkingur II	Norðragøta

== League table ==
Pos	Team	Pld	W	D	L	GF	GA	GD	Pts	Promotion or relegation
1	Skála (C, P)	27	23	1	3	82	20	+62	70	Promotion to Faroe Islands Premier League
2	NSÍ Runavík (P)	27	18	3	6	67	28	+39	57	Promotion to Faroe Islands Premier League
3	KÍ II	27	15	2	10	63	40	+23	47	
4	Víkingur II	27	15	2	10	61	42	+19	47	
5	B71 Sandoy	27	14	5	8	58	39	+19	47	
6	Hoyvík	27	11	4	12	48	53	−5	37	
7	B36 Tórshavn II	27	10	3	14	56	50	+6	33	
8	HB II	27	8	3	16	42	65	−23	27	
9	B68 Toftir II (R)	27	5	2	20	26	82	−56	17	Relegation to 2. delid
10	EB/Streymur II (R)	27	2	3	22	23	107	−84	9	Relegation to 2. delid

Source: Soccerway
Rules for classification: 1) Points; 2) Goal difference; 3) Goals scored.
(C) Champions; (P) Promoted; (R) Relegated

== Fixtures and results ==
Each team plays three times (either twice at home and once away or once at home and twice away) against each other team for a total of 27 matches each.

Home \ Away	B36	B68	B71	EBI	HBI	HOY	KII	NSÍ	SKA	VII	B36	B68	B71	EBI	HBI	HOY	KII	NSÍ	SKA	VII
B36 Tórshavn II	—	2–0	1–2	3–1	1–0	3–0	4–1	0–2	1–1	2–3	—	—	7–1	3–0	—	—	0–2	1–3	—	—
B68 Toftir II	0–5	—	1–0	5–3	1–2	2–1	1–3	0–3	0–2	1–2	3–7	—	—	—	3–1	1–1	—	—	0–6	0–4
B71 Sandoy	3–0	6–0	—	1–1	1–1	3–1	2–1	1–2	0–2	3–0	—	4–1	—	3–0	4–1	—	—	4–1	4–0	—
EB/Streymur II	1–4	1–2	2–2	—	1–0	3–3	0–5	1–6	0–3	0–2	—	2–0	—	—	2–3	1–6	—	—	0–5	—
HB II	4–4	6–0	0–3	4–0	—	2–3	0–1	5–0	1–5	0–4	3–1	—	—	—	—	—	0–6	1–5	—	2–1
Hoyvík	2–2	3–1	2–1	2–1	2–1	—	4–1	1–3	0–3	3–4	2–0	—	0–2	—	1–0	—	—	—	—	0–3
KÍ II	3–2	4–1	2–1	4–1	2–3	4–3	—	0–2	0–3	2–1	—	2–0	0–0	10–0	—	2–0	—	1–1	—	—
NSÍ Runavík	2–1	0–0	5–1	5–0	1–1	5–1	3–1	—	0–1	1–0	—	5–0	—	6–0	—	0–2	—	—	0–3	—
Skála	3–0	4–1	5–1	7–0	3–0	0–1	4–1	1–0	—	3–1	4–1	—	—	—	6–0	4–3	2–1	—	—	2–1
Víkingur II	1–0	3–2	2–4	7–1	4–1	1–1	1–0	2–3	3–1	—	3–1	—	1–1	6–1	—	—	1–4	0–3	—	—

Source: Soccerway
Legend: Blue = home team win; Yellow = draw; Red = away team win.
For upcoming matches, an "a" indicates there is an article about the rivalry between the two participants.
