= 2020 2. deild =

2. deild
- Season: 2020
- Champions: Skála ÍF II
- Promoted: Skála ÍF II; FC Suðuroy
- Relegated: KÍ Klaksvík III; Víkingur III
- Top goalscorer: Ari Poulsen (20 goals)

2020 2. deild was the 45th season of the third-tier football on the Faroe Islands.

== League table ==
Pos	Team	Pld	W	D	L	GF	GA	GD	Pts	Qualification or relegation
1	Skála II (P)	18	15	1	2	70	15	+55	46	Promotion to 1. deild
2	Suðuroy (P)	18	14	1	3	67	19	+48	43	Promotion to 1. deild
3	EB/Streymur II	18	13	1	4	68	25	+43	40	
4	B68 Toftir II	18	10	2	6	43	32	+11	32	
5	TB II	18	6	3	9	32	57	−25	21	
6	NSÍ Runavík III	18	6	1	11	42	53	−11	19	
7	Undrið	18	6	0	12	27	49	−22	18	
8	Royn Hvalba	18	4	4	10	24	57	−33	16	
9	KÍ III (R)	18	5	3	10	40	59	−19	18	Relegation to 3. deild
10	Víkingur III (R)	18	3	0	15	30	77	−47	9	Relegation to 3. deild

Source: Soccerway
Rules for classification: 1) Points; 2) Goal difference; 3) Goals scored.
(P) Promoted; (R) Relegated

== Results ==
Each team plays two times (once at home and once away) against every other team for a total of 18 matches each.

=== Rounds 1–18 ===
Home \ Away	B68	EBS	KÍI	NSÍ	ROY	SKÁ	SUÐ	TBI	UND	VÍK
B68 Toftir II			2–2		4–0		2–0			
EB/Streymur II			8–1	6–1				5–2		
KÍ III				2–5			1–3			8–1
NSÍ Runavík III					5–1		4–1	2–1		4–2
Royn Hvalba		3–2	3–0						1–2	3–2
Skála II	2–1	5–0	5–0							
Suðuroy		2–0			1–0	5–0				
TB II	2–1			3–0		3–4	0–3			4–3
Undrið	1–2	2–3		2–1				4–3		
Víkingur III	0–2					0–4			3–1	

Updated to match(es) played on 18 July 2020. Source: Soccerway
Legend: Blue = home team win; Yellow = draw; Red = away team win.

== See also ==
- 2020 Faroe Islands Premier League
- 2020 Faroe Islands Cup
- 2020 1. deild
