= 2014 2. deild =

2. deild
- Season: 2014
- Champions: MB (1st title)
- Promoted: MB; B71
- Relegated: FC Suðuroy II; Undrið
- Matches played: 90
- Goals scored: 402 (4.47 per match)
- Top goalscorer: Otto Jacobsen (18 goals)
- Biggest home win: Víkingur III 12−1 FC Suðuroy II (R18)
- Biggest away win: Undrið 0−6 Giza/Hoyvík (R16); FC Suðuroy II 0−6 TB II (R17)
- Highest scoring: Víkingur III 12−1 FC Suðuroy II (R18)

2014 2. deild was the 39th season of the third-tier football on the Faroe Islands.

== League table ==
Pos	Team	Pld	W	D	L	GF	GA	GD	Pts	Promotion or Relegation
1	MB Miðvágur	18	12	4	2	50	17	+33	40	Promotion to 1. deild
2	B71 Sandoy	18	12	3	3	51	22	+29	39	Promotion to 1. deild
3	Giza/Hoyvík	18	10	2	6	56	27	+29	32	
4	B36 Tórshavn III	18	8	4	6	44	40	+4	28	
5	TB Tvøroyri II	18	8	1	9	39	52	−13	25	
6	Víkingur III	18	7	1	10	46	59	−13	22	
7	B68 Toftir II	18	6	3	9	23	31	−8	21	
8	ÍF Fuglafjørður II	18	6	1	11	38	41	−3	19	
9	Undrið FF	18	5	4	9	28	45	−17	19	Relegation to 3. deild
10	FC Suðuroy II	18	4	1	13	27	68	−41	13	Relegation to 3. deild

Source: Faroe Soccer
Rules for classification: 1) points; 2) goal difference; 3) number of goals scored

== Results ==
Home \ Away	B36	B68	B71	FCS	G/H	ÍFF	MBM	TBT	UND	VIK
B36 Tórshavn III		1–1	2–2	8–0	3–2	2–1	0–3 (Note: B36 III won 3–2 but fielded an ineligible player.)	1–1	2–5	6–2
B68 Toftir II	2–1		1–0	3–1	5–2	0–3	0–1	0–1	1–1	1–2
B71 Sandoy	5–0	2–0		5–0	1–1	4–0	2–1	6–5	4–0	4–1
FC Suðuroy II	1–5	3–0	4–2		1–5	5–3	1–2	0–6	0–0	3–0
Giza/Hoyvík	8–0	3–0	4–0	3–0		1–1	0–3	7–2	3–1	1–2
ÍF Fuglafjørður II	0–2	3–0	0–3 (Note: ÍF II won 2–0 but fielded an ineligible player.)	2–1	1–2		1–3	7–0	3–2	8–1
MB Miðvágur	3–1	0–0	1–1	6–3	4–1	4–0		5–0	0–0	6–2
TB Tvøroyri II	1–2	2–3	1–4	4–3	2–1	4–1	2–1		1–4	2–1
Undrið FF	2–2	2–4	0–4	2–0	0–6	3–2	0–4	4–1		1–6
Víkingur III	1–6	3–2	1–2	12–1	1–6	4–2	3–3	2–4	2–1	

Updated to match(es) played on 4 October 2014. Source: Faroe Soccer
Legend: Blue = home team win; Yellow = draw; Red = away team win.

== Top goalscorers ==
Rank	Player	Team	Goals
1	(Faroe Islands) Otto Jacobsen	MB	18 (4)
2	(Faroe Islands) Tummas Pauli Olsen	B71	13
3	(Faroe Islands) Margeir Toftegaard	ÍF II	12

== See also ==
- 2014 Faroe Islands Premier League
- 2014 Faroe Islands Cup
- 2014 1. deild
