= 2024 Faroe Islands Cup =

Løgmanssteypið

Tournament details
- Country: Faroe Islands
- Teams: 15

Final positions
- Champions: Havnar Bóltfelag
- Runners-up: B36 Tórshavn

Tournament statistics
- Matches played: 16
- Goals scored: 53 (3.31 per match)

The 2024 Faroe Islands Cup was the 70th edition of the Faroe Islands domestic football cup. It began on 24 April 2024 and ended on 2 November 2024.

== First round ==
Nine teams from the 2024 Faroe Islands Premier League and five teams from the 2024 1. deild entered the first round; one team from the Premier League (NSÍ Runavík) received a bye.

Team 1	Score	Team 2
24 April 2024
B71 Sandoy	1–1 (a.e.t.) (5–6 p)	AB Argir
Hoyvík	1–3	Víkingur Gøta
Suðuroy	0–2	TB Tvøroyri
KÍ	2–3	Havnar Bóltfelag
25 April 2024
B68 Toftir	1–0	ÍF
EB/Streymur	5–0	07 Vestur
B36 Tórshavn	3–1	Skála

== Quarter-finals ==
The seven first round winners and one team given a first round bye entered the quarter-finals.

Team 1	Score	Team 2
8 May 2024
Víkingur Gøta	3–0 (a.e.t.)	AB Argir
9 May 2024
TB Tvøroyri	1–1 (a.e.t.) (5–4 p)	B68 Toftir
B36 Tórshavn	3–2 (a.e.t.)	NSÍ Runavík
EB/Streymur	1–3 (a.e.t.)	Havnar Bóltfelag

== Semi-finals ==
The four quarter-final winners entered the semi-finals, held over two legs. The first legs were held on 29 May, followed by the second legs on 19 June and 22 August.

Team 1	Agg.	Team 2	1st leg	2nd leg
TB Tvøroyri	1–3	B36 Tórshavn	1–0	0–3
Havnar Bóltfelag	5–3	Víkingur Gøta	1–0	4–3

== Final ==
The final was held between the two semi-final winners.

2 November 2024
15:00

B36 Tórshavn	2–2	Havnar Bóltfelag
Penalties
	3–4

Tórsvøllur, Tórshavn
Referee: Rúni Gaardbo
