= 2013 Faroe Islands Cup =

Løgmanssteypið

Tournament details
- Country: Faroe Islands
- Teams: 18

Final positions
- Champions: Víkingur
- Runners-up: EB/Streymur

Tournament statistics
- Matches played: 19
- Goals scored: 64 (3.37 per match)
- Top goal scorer: Finnur Justinussen (5 goals)

The 2013 Faroe Islands Cup was the 59th edition of the Faroe Islands domestic football cup. It started on 30 March 2013 and ended with the final on 24 August 2013. Víkingur Gøta were the defending champions, having won their second cup title the previous year. The winner of the competition qualified for the first qualifying round of the 2014–15 UEFA Europa League.

Only the first teams of Faroese football clubs were allowed to participate. The preliminary round involved only teams from 1. deild, 2. deild and 3. deild competitions. Teams from the highest division entered the competition in the first round.

== Preliminary round ==
Three clubs from the 2. deild and one club from the 3. deild entered this round. These matches took place on 30 March 2013. The draw for this round was made on a live TV broadcast on KVF's show 3-2 on 11 March 2013.

Team 1	Score	Team 2
FF Giza/FC Hoyvík	2–0	MB
Undrið FF	5–1	Royn

== First round ==
The two winners from the preliminary round, all ten clubs from the Faroe Islands Premier League and four clubs from the 1. deild entered this round. The matches took place on 14 April 2013. The draw for this round was made on a live TV broadcast on KVF's show 3-2 on 11 March 2013.

Team 1	Score	Team 2
FC Suðuroy	2–1	Undrið FF
FF Giza/FC Hoyvík	1–9	EB/Streymur
B36	1–2	Víkingur
AB	1–2	ÍF
NSÍ	2–0	TB
Skála	2–1	07 Vestur
B68	0–3	KÍ
B71	1–5	HB

== Quarter-finals ==
The matches took place on 5 May 2013.

Team 1	Score	Team 2
HB	0–0 (a.e.t.); 3–5 (p)	EB/Streymur
KÍ	1–0	ÍF
Skála	0–3	NSÍ
Víkingur	4–1	FC Suðuroy

== Semi-finals ==
The ties were played over two legs on 29 May and 7 August 2013.

Team 1	Agg.	Team 2	1st leg	2nd leg
Víkingur	4–3	NSÍ	3–2	1–1
KÍ	2–3	EB/Streymur	1–1	1–2

== Final ==
24 August 2013
19:45 WEST

EB/Streymur	0–2	Víkingur
	Report	Justinussen 14'; Vatnhamar 19'

Tórsvøllur, Tórshavn
Attendance: 2,884
Referee: Rúni Gaardbo

== Top goalscorers ==
Rank	Player	Club	Goals
1	(Faroe Islands) Finnur Justinussen	Víkingur	5
2	(Faroe Islands) Erling Fles	Undrið FF	4
3	(Faroe Islands) Klæmint Olsen	NSÍ	3
4	(Faroe Islands) Árni Frederiksberg	NSÍ	2
4	(Faroe Islands) Palli Augustinussen	FC Suðuroy	2
4	(Faroe Islands) Pætur Dam Jacobsen	EB/Streymur	2

Updated to games played on 24 August 2013
Source: FaroeSoccer
