= 2022 Faroe Islands Premier League =

Faroe Islands Premier League
- Season: 2022
- Dates: 5 March – 22 October 2022
- Champions: KÍ (20th title)
- Relegated: Skála; NSÍ Runavík
- Champions League: KÍ
- Europa Conference League: Víkingur; Havnar Bóltfelag; B36 Tórshavn
- Matches: 135
- Goals: 442 (3.27 per match)
- Top goalscorer: Sølvi Vatnhamar (19 goals)
- Biggest home win: KÍ 8–0 Skála (22 October 2022)
- Biggest away win: B68 Toftir 0–6 Víkingur (14 May 2022); 07 Vestur 0–6 KÍ (15 May 2022); EB/Streymur 0–6 KÍ (16 October 2022)
- Highest scoring: 07 Vestur 5–4 EB/Streymur (2 July 2022); B68 Toftir 7–2 Skála (7 August 2022)
- Longest winning run: 10 matches KÍ
- Longest unbeaten run: 27 matches KÍ
- Longest winless run: 14 matches Skála
- Longest losing run: 8 matches B68 Toftir
- All statistics correct as of 22 October 2022.

The 2022 Faroe Islands Premier League was the 80th season of top-tier football in the Faroe Islands, and the 18th under the current format.

KÍ were the defending champions, having won their 19th Faroese title in the previous season.

== Teams ==
TB Tvøroyri (relegated after five years in the top flight) and ÍF (relegated after three years in the top flight) were relegated after last season. They were replaced with Skála and AB Argir (both promoted after a one-year absence).

Team	City	Stadium	Capacity
07 Vestur	Sørvágur	á Dungasandi	2,000
B36 Tórshavn	Tórshavn	Gundadalur	5,000
B68 Toftir	Toftir	Svangaskarð	6,000
EB/Streymur	Streymnes	Við Margáir	2,000
Havnar Bóltfelag	Tórshavn	Gundadalur	5,000
AB Argir	Argir	Inni í Vika	2,000
Klaksvíkar Ítróttarfelag	Klaksvík	Við Djúpumýrar	4,000
NSÍ Runavík	Runavík	Við Løkin	2,000
Skála ÍF	Skála	Undir Mýruhjalla	2,000
Víkingur Gøta	Norðragøta	Sarpugerði	3,000

== League table ==
Pos	Team	Pld	W	D	L	GF	GA	GD	Pts	Qualification or relegation
1	KÍ (C)	27	25	2	0	78	7	+71	77	Qualification for the Champions League first qualifying round
2	Víkingur	27	18	4	5	69	24	+45	58	Qualification for the Europa Conference League first qualifying round
3	Havnar Bóltfelag	27	17	4	6	56	27	+29	55	Qualification for the Europa Conference League first qualifying round
4	B36 Tórshavn	27	11	5	11	48	29	+19	38	Qualification for the Europa Conference League first qualifying round
5	EB/Streymur	27	10	5	12	31	54	−23	35	
6	B68 Toftir	27	9	3	15	37	50	−13	30	
7	07 Vestur	27	7	8	12	34	61	−27	29	
8	AB Argir	27	8	5	14	33	63	−30	29	
9	NSÍ Runavík (R)	27	6	3	18	31	59	−28	21	Qualification to the relegation play-offs
10	Skála (R)	27	1	7	19	25	68	−43	10	Relegation to 1. deild

Source: Flashscore, Soccerway
Rules for classification: 1) Points; 2) Goal difference; 3) Goals scored.
(C) Champions; (R) Relegated

== Fixtures and results ==
Each team plays three times (either twice at home and once away or once at home and twice away) against each other team for a total of 27 matches each.

=== Rounds 1–18 ===
Home \ Away	ABA	B36	EBS	HAV	KÍ	NSÍ	SKA	TOF	VES	VÍK
AB Argir		0–3	1–1	1–3	0–2	2–3	2–1	4–1	3–3	0–0
B36 Tórshavn	1–2		5–0	0–1	0–1	1–1	5–1	4–1	3–0	0–3
EB/Streymur	1–0	1–5		1–4	0–2	3–4	1–0	2–1	3–0	1–2
Havnar Bóltfelag	3–0	1–0	2–2		1–2	5–1	3–0	1–2	2–2	2–1
KÍ	6–1	1–0	3–0	2–0		4–2	8–0	2–0	3–0	1–0
NSÍ Runavík	1–4	0–2	0–1	0–2	0–4		2–1	0–2	0–1	1–3
Skála	5–0	1–1	0–0	2–3	0–3	1–4		1–2	0–0	1–3
B68 Toftir	0–1	1–0	0–1	1–1	0–5	0–1	2–2		0–1	0–4
07 Vestur	1–3	0–1	5–4	0–4	0–6	3–2	2–0	1–0		2–3
Víkingur	4–1	2–1	1–2	4–2	0–0	3–0	4–2	2–1	6–1	

Source: Flashscore
Legend: Blue = home team win; Yellow = draw; Red = away team win.

=== Rounds 19–27 ===
Home \ Away	ABA	B36	EBS	HAV	KÍ	NSÍ	SKA	TOF	VES	VÍK
AB Argir		0–5		2–1		1–2	2–0	0–3		
B36 Tórshavn				0–3			5–0	3–1		0–0
EB/Streymur	1–1	3–2			0–6	1–0			0–3	
Havnar Bóltfelag			2–0			3–1			3–0	2–1
KÍ	4–1	1–1		1–0				3–0	2–0	
NSÍ Runavík		1–2			0–3			2–3	1–1	
Skála			0–1	1–1	0–1	1–1			0–1	
B68 Toftir			1–1	0–1			7–2			0–6
07 Vestur	1–1	1–1						2–6		1–1
Víkingur	7–0		4–0		1–2	2–1	2–0			

Source: Flashscore, Soccerway
Legend: Blue = home team win; Yellow = draw; Red = away team win.

== Top scorers ==
As of 22 October 2022

Rank	Player	Club	Goals
1	(Faroe Islands) Sølvi Vatnhamar	Víkingur	19
2	(Faroe Islands) Páll Klettskarð	KÍ	18
3	(Faroe Islands) Jóannes Bjartalíð	KÍ	17
4	(Faroe Islands) Stefan Radosavljevic	Havnar Bóltfelag	13
5	(Denmark) Mads Borchers	07 Vestur	12
6	(Faroe Islands) Árni Frederiksberg	KÍ	11
6	(Poland) Michał Przybylski	B36 Tórshavn	11
6	(Serbia) Uroš Stojanov	Skála	11
9	(Faroe Islands) Pætur Petersen	Havnar Bóltfelag	10
10	(Faroe Islands) Martin Klein	Víkingur	9
10	(Faroe Islands) Klæmint Olsen	NSÍ Runavík	9
