= Atli Gregersen =

Faroese footballer (born 1982)

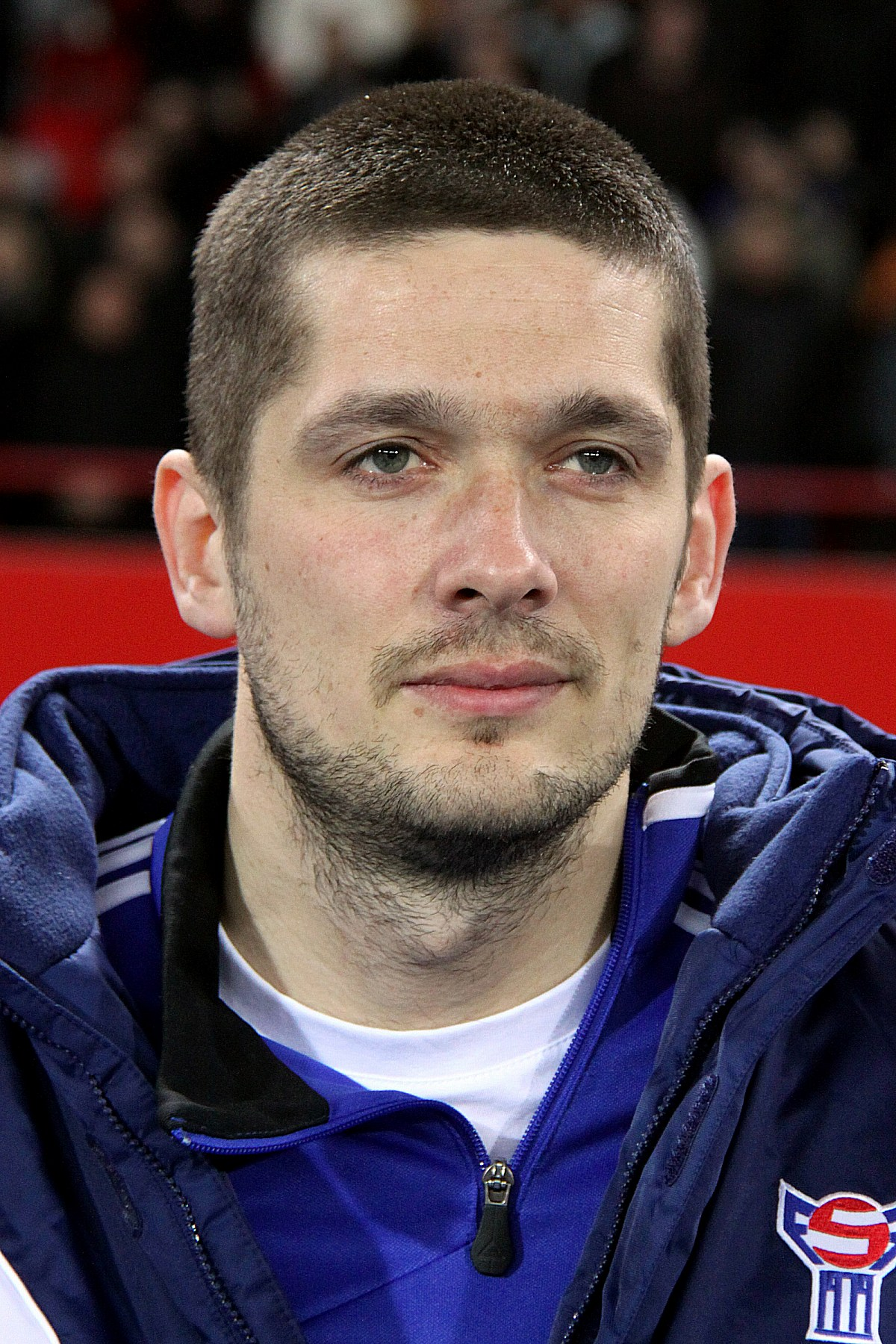
- Gregersen in 2014 with the Faroe Islands national team

Personal information
- Date of birth: 15 June 1982 (age 44)
- Place of birth: Tórshavn, Faroe Islands
- Height: 1.94 m (6 ft 4 in)
- Position: Defender

Senior career*
Years	Team	Apps	(Gls)
2001–2003	Randers FC	3	(0)
2003–2004	Lyngby BK	6	(1)
2004–2005	GÍ Gøta	32	(0)
2005	IF Skjold	2	(0)
2005–2007	BK Frem	13	(0)
2007	GÍ Gøta	24	(0)
2008–2010	Víkingur	57	(5)
2010–2011	Ross County	0	(0)
2011–2025	Víkingur	366	(15)
Total		503	(21)

International career
1998	Faroe Islands U17	7	(0)
1999–2000	Faroe Islands U19	5	(0)
2009–2020	Faroe Islands	59	(1)

Managerial career
- 2023–2024: Faroe Islands U21 (assistant)
- 2024–: Faroe Islands (assistant)
- * Club domestic league appearances and goals

Atli Gregersen (born 15 June 1982) is a Faroese former professional footballer who played as a defender. He has been capped for the Faroe Islands at senior and youth level.

== Club career ==
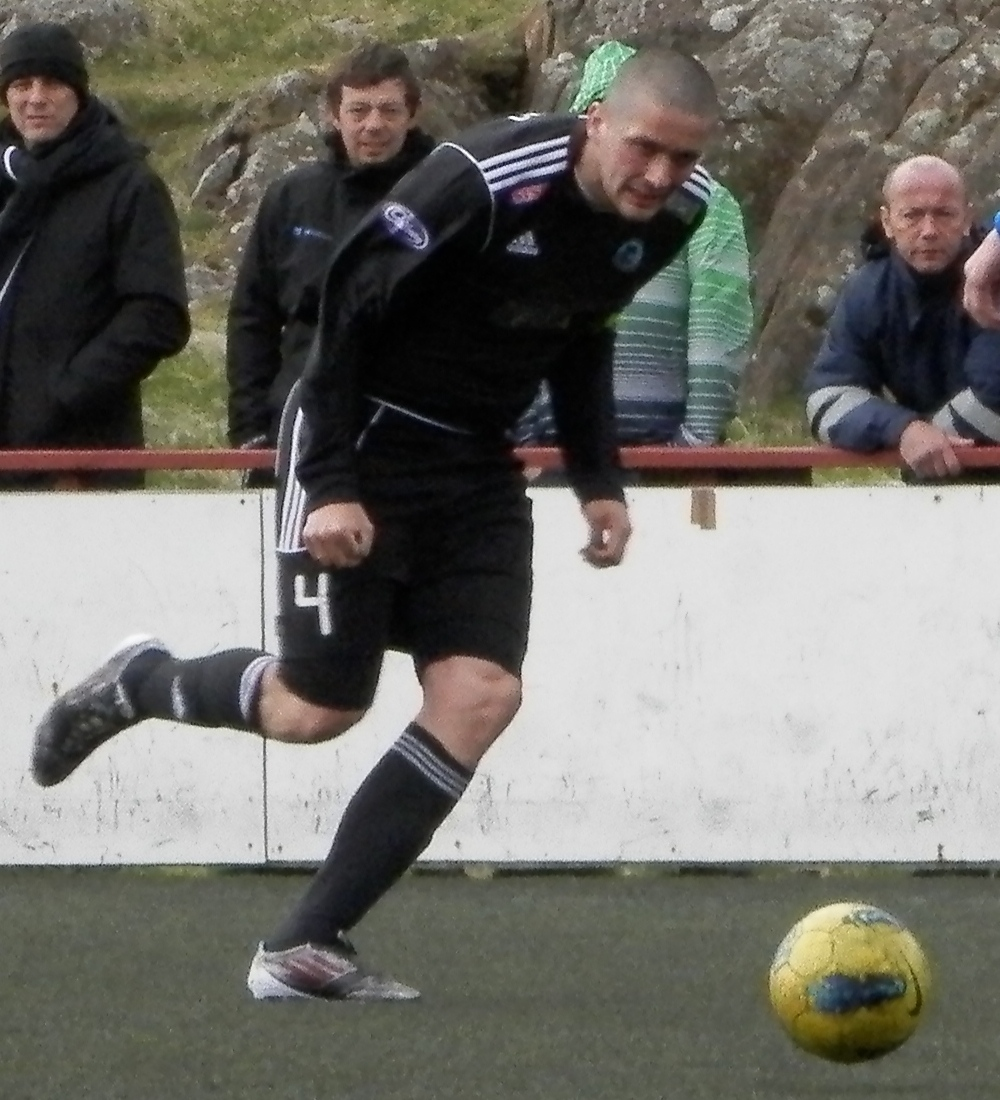
Gregersen in 2012 with Víkingur

Gregersen spent his early career playing in both the Faroe Islands and Denmark, for Randers FC and Lyngby BK, IF Skjold, BK Frem, and Víkingur.

Gregersen signed for Scottish club Ross County in June 2010, before leaving the club in February 2011, having made just one appearance for them in the League Cup.

In 2011, Gregersen returned to Vikingur. At the club he played alongside his son Árni Nóa Atlason, 24 years his junior, becoming the second father-son duo in the history of football to win a title in the top tier, after only Aleksei Yeryomenko and Alexei Eremenko, who won the Veikkausliiga in 2002 and 2003. They also went on to set a new world record for the most father-son top-flight matches in the 21st century (currently 48, each with 24). Additionally, Atli's father, Árni Gregersen, was also still active in the Faroese top-flight in 2024, but as a referee. As the captain of Vikingur, he was named the Faroese Footballer of the Year, becoming, at the age of 42, the oldest player to do so.

== International career ==
Having made his international debut in 2009, Gregersen became the national team captain in 2010.

== Career statistics ==
Scores and results list the Faroe Islands' goal tally first.

No	Date	Venue	Opponent	Score	Result	Competition
1.	22 March 2018	Estadio Municipal de Marbella, Marbella, Spain	Latvia	1–0	1–1	Friendly

== Honours ==
GÍ Gøta

- Faroe Islands Cup: 2005

Víkingur

- Faroe Islands Premier League: 2016, 2017, 2024
- Faroe Islands Cup: 2009, 2013, 2014, 2015, 2022
- Faroe Islands Super Cup: 2014, 2015, 2016, 2017

Individual

- Faroese Footballer of the Year: 2024
