= 2024 Faroe Islands Premier League =

Faroe Islands Premier League
- Season: 2024
- Dates: 9 March – 26 October 2024
- Champions: Víkingur (3rd title)
- Relegated: ÍF; Skála
- Champions League: Víkingur
- Conference League: Havnar Bóltfelag; KÍ; NSÍ Runavík
- Matches: 135
- Goals: 445 (3.3 per match)
- Top goalscorer: Páll Klettskarð (17 goals)
- Longest winning run: Víkingur (13 Matches)
- Longest unbeaten run: Víkingur (13 Matches)
- Longest winless run: ÍF (20 matches)
- Longest losing run: ÍF (9 matches)
- All statistics correct as of 26 October 2024.

The 2024 Faroe Islands Premier League was the 82nd edition of top-tier football in the Faroe Islands, and the 19th under the current format. The season ran in 2024 from 9 March until 26 October.

The winners (Víkingur) qualified for the Champions League first qualifying round. The 2024 Faroe Islands Cup winners (Havnar Bóltfelag) qualified for the Conference League second qualifying round, with the runners-up (KÍ) and fourth-placed team (NSÍ Runavík) qualifying for the first qualifying round. The bottom two teams (ÍF and Skála) were relegated to the 2025 1. deild.

== Teams ==
The league consisted of ten teams; the top eight teams from the previous season, and two teams promoted from 1. deild. KÍ entered the season as defending champions (for the third consecutive season).

The promoted teams were 2023 1. deild champions Skála ÍF and runners-up NSÍ Runavík. They replaced the 2023 Faroe Islands Premier League bottom two teams, AB Argir and TB Tvøroyri.

Locations of the 2024 Faroe Islands Premier League teams

Team	City	Stadium	Capacity
B36 Tórshavn	Tórshavn	Gundadalur	5,000
B68 Toftir	Toftir	Svangaskarð	6,000
EB/Streymur	Streymnes	Við Margáir	2,000
Havnar Bóltfelag	Tórshavn	Gundadalur	5,000
ÍF	Fuglafjørður	Í Fløtugerði	3,000
KÍ	Klaksvík	Við Djúpumýrar	4,000
NSÍ Runavík	Runavík	Við Løkin	2,000
Skála ÍF	Skála	Undir Mýruhjalla	2,000
07 Vestur	Sørvágur	Á Dungasandi	2,000
Víkingur	Norðragøta	Sarpugerði	3,000

=== Personnel and sponsoring ===
Note: Flags indicate national team as has been defined under FIFA eligibility rules. Players and Managers may hold more than one non-FIFA nationality.

Team	Head coach	Captain	Kit manufacturer	Shirt sponsor
07 Vestur	(Faroe Islands) Dan Brimsvík	(Faroe Islands) Sonni Ragnar Nattestad	Adidas	Útsynið
B36	(Norway) Magne Hoseth	(Faroe Islands) Andrias Eriksen	Puma	Andy Robson Tips
B68	(Faroe Islands) Jákup á Borg	(Faroe Islands) Aleksandur Jensen	Erreà	KBH
EB/Streymur	(Faroe Islands) Sigfríður Clementsen	(Faroe Islands) Andras Olsen	Adidas	Bónus
HB	(Italy) Adolfo Sormani	(Faroe Islands) Teitur Gestsson	Puma	SMS - Shopping Center
ÍF	(Faroe Islands) Ólavur Larsen (caretaker)	(Faroe Islands) Karl Løkin	Adidas	Havsbrún
KÍ	(Norway) Espen Haug (caretaker)	(Faroe Islands) Jákup B. Andreassen	Craft Sportswear	Norðoya Sparikassi
NSÍ	(Sweden) Jens Wedeborg	(Faroe Islands) Klæmint Olsen	Erreà	Navigare Shipping
Skála ÍF	(Faroe Islands) Pauli Poulsen	(Faroe Islands) Jákup Jakobsen	Adidas	MEST Shipyard
Víkingur	(Faroe Islands) Jóhan Petur Poulsen	(Faroe Islands) Atli Gregersen	Adidas	Tavan

== League table ==
Pos	Team	Pld	W	D	L	GF	GA	GD	Pts	Qualification or relegation
1	Víkingur (C)	27	24	1	2	79	14	+65	73	Qualification for the Champions League first qualifying round
2	KÍ	27	22	1	4	58	24	+34	67	Qualification for the Conference League first qualifying round
3	Havnar Bóltfelag	27	19	2	6	55	23	+32	59	Qualification for the Conference League second qualifying round (Note: Havnar Bóltfelag qualified for the Conference League second qualifying round by winning the 2024 Faroe Islands Cup. Since they qualified based on league position, the second Conference League first round spot was passed to the fourth-placed team.)
4	NSÍ Runavík	27	13	3	11	54	43	+11	42	Qualification for the Conference League first qualifying round
5	B36 Tórshavn	27	11	8	8	56	42	+14	41	
6	07 Vestur	27	9	3	15	34	60	−26	30	
7	EB/Streymur	27	9	1	17	35	49	−14	28	
8	B68 Toftir	27	5	6	16	23	48	−25	21	
9	Skála (R)	27	5	5	17	27	57	−30	20	Relegation to the 1. deild
10	ÍF (R)	27	1	4	22	24	85	−61	7	Relegation to the 1. deild

Source: Soccerway
Rules for classification: 1) Points; 2) Goal difference; 3) Goals scored.
(C) Champions; (R) Relegated

== Fixtures and results ==
Teams play each other three times (either twice at home and once away or once at home and twice away) for a total of 27 matches each.

Home \ Away	B36	EBS	HAV	ÍF	KÍ	NSI	SKA	TOF	VES	VÍK	B36	EBS	HAV	ÍF	KÍ	NSI	SKA	TOF	VES	VÍK
B36 Tórshavn	—	1–0	2–2	3–3	2–0	2–2	3–0	1–1	2–2	1–2	—	—	—	—	—	—	3–0	2–0	4–4	1–4
EB/Streymur	0–4	—	0–4	5–0	0–1	4–1	3–0	1–1	6–0	1–3	1–0	—	1–4	2–1	1–2	—	1–0	—	—	—
Havnar Bóltfelag	2–1	2–1	—	4–0	1–0	3–2	3–0	1–0	1–0	1–1	2–1	—	—	1–0	3–0	—	3–0	—	—	—
ÍF	3–4	0–1	2–1	—	1–4	2–4	1–2	2–2	0–1	1–8	0–3	—	—	—	—	0–3	—	1–3	—	0–6
KÍ	4–2	2–1	1–0	6–0	—	3–2	3–1	3–0	2–0	2–1	2–2	—	—	2–1	—	3–1	—	4–0	—	0–2
NSÍ Runavík	1–0	2–0	2–3	3–0	1–2	—	3–1	1–4	4–1	0–1	2–2	4–0	3–2	—	—	—	3–0	—	4–0	—
Skála	1–4	3–0	0–3	3–2	1–2	0–0	—	3–1	1–2	0–4	—	—	—	3–3	0–1	—	—	1–1	4–1	0–3
B68 Toftir	0–3	2–0	0–1	0–0	0–2	1–2	1–1	—	1–2	1–2	—	1–4	1–0	—	—	1–4	—	—	1–0	—
07 Vestur	0–3	4–2	0–3	1–0	0–4	3–0	1–1	2–0	—	0–2	—	2–0	1–4	5–1	0–1	—	—	—	—	—
Víkingur	4–0	4–0	2–1	5–0	1–2	2–0	2–1	2–0	5–1	—	—	1–0	2–0	—	—	3–0	—	3–0	4–1	—

Source: Soccerway
Legend: Blue = home team win; Yellow = draw; Red = away team win.
For upcoming matches, an "a" indicates there is an article about the rivalry between the two participants.

== Attendances ==
#	Club	Average
1	HB	629
2	KÍ	595
3	Víkingur	569
4	NSÍ	469
5	B68	453
6	B36	370
7	Skála	320
8	EB/Streymur	259
9	ÍF	235
10	Vestur	200
