= Jákup Johansen =

Faroese footballer

Personal information
- Full name: Jákup Johansen
- Date of birth: 27 April 1993 (age 33)
- Place of birth: Faroe Islands
- Position: Forward

Team information
- Current team: Víkingur
- Number: 7

Senior career*
Years	Team	Apps	(Gls)
2009–2011	Skála ÍF	39	(18)
2011–2013	ÍF	27	(2)
2013–2020	Skála ÍF	128	(47)
2020–	Víkingur	171	(49)

International career^{‡}
2021–	Faroe Islands	1	(0)
- * Club domestic league appearances and goals as of 1 November 2026 ‡ National team caps and goals as of 2 August 2021

Jákup Johansen (born 27 April 1993) is a Faroese professional footballer who plays as a forward for Víkingur.
