= Mark Ryutin =

Russian footballer

Personal information
- Full name: Mark Sergeevich Ryutin
- Date of birth: 26 March 1988 (age 38)
- Place of birth: Russia
- Position: Goalkeeper

Senior career*
Years	Team	Apps	(Gls)
2010/2011	FC Zaria Bălți	0	(0)
2010/2011	Gagauziya-Oguzsport→(loan)	8	(0)
2014	Skála ÍF	17	(0)
2015	Vendsyssel FF	1	(0)
2016	Thisted FC	0	(0)
- * Club domestic league appearances and goals

Mark Ryutin (Russian: Марк Рютин; born 26 March 1988 in Russia) is a Russian retired footballer who last played for Thisted in Denmark.

== Career ==
Ryutin started his senior career with Zaria Bălți. In 2010, he signed for Gagauziya-Oguzsport in the Moldovan National Division, where he made eight league appearances and scored zero goals. After that, he played for Skála ÍF, Vendsyssel FF, and Thisted.
