= Rasmus Andersson (footballer) =

Swedish footballer

Personal information
- Full name: Rasmus Fred; Christer Andersson
- Date of birth: 17 April 1993 (age 33)
- Place of birth: Sweden
- Height: 1.78 m (5 ft 10 in)
- Position: Midfielder

Team information
- Current team: Falkenbergs FF
- Number: 23

Youth career
- –2005: Arvidstorps IK
- 2006–2012: Falkenbergs FF

Senior career*
| Years | Team | Apps | (Gls) |
| 2013–2016 | Falkenbergs FF | 11 | (0) |
| 2016 | Ørn-Horten | 10 | (0) |
| 2016–2017 | Skála ÍF | 9 | (2) |
| 2017–2018 | Tvååkers IF | 51 | (15) |
| 2018–2019 | IS Halmia | 12 | (4) |
| 2019–2023 | Tvååkers IF | 104 | (44) |
| 2023– | Falkenbergs FF | 43 | (5) |
- * Club domestic league appearances and goals as of 1 January 2025

Rasmus Andersson (born 17 April 1993) is a Swedish footballer who plays for Falkenbergs FF as a midfielder.
