= Eyðun Klakstein =

Faroese football coach (born 1972)

Personal information
- Full name: Eyðun Klakstein
- Date of birth: 28 November 1972 (age 53)
- Position: Midfielder

Team information
- Current team: Faroe Islands (manager)

Senior career*
Years	Team	Apps	(Gls)
1991	KÍ Klaksvík		
1992	ÍF Fuglafjørður		
1993–1997	KÍ Klaksvík		
1999–2001	KÍ Klaksvík		
2003–2005	KÍ Klaksvík		

Managerial career
- 2007: KÍ Klaksvík (assistant)
- 2007–2008: KÍ Klaksvík
- 2012–2016: Faroe Islands U19
- 2013–2014: KÍ Klaksvík
- 2015–2016: B36 Tórshavn
- 2018–2019: Skála ÍF
- 2020: Víkingur Gøta
- 2021–2022: Faroe Islands U17
- 2023–2024: Faroe Islands U21
- 2025–: Faroe Islands
- * Club domestic league appearances and goals

Eyðun Klakstein (born 28 November 1972) is a Faroese football manager and former player who is the head coach of the Faroe Islands. In 2025, he was appointed as the manager of the Faroe Islands national football team.

Eyðun is a journalist by profession. He made his literary debut in 2021 with the crime novel List, which was one of the best-selling books of the year. His second novel, the thriller Lygn, was released in 2023.

He spent most of his playing career in KÍ Klaksvík, a team he also managed on two occasions.
