= Thisted FC =

Danish football club

Thisted
- Full name: Thisted Fodbold Club
- Short name: TFC
- Founded: 1989; 37 years ago
- Ground: Sparekassen Thy Arena
- Capacity: 3,000
- Chairman: Claus Grønkjær Sørensen
- Manager: Daniel Kristensen
- League: Danish 2nd Division
- 2025–26: Danish 2nd Division, 5th of 12
Home colours	Away colours

Thisted Fodbold Club (Danish pronunciation: [ˈtsʰisteð]) is an association football club based in the town of Thisted, North Jutland, Denmark, that competes in the Danish 2nd Division, the third tier of the Danish football league system. Founded in 1989, it is shortly known as 'TFC' and affiliated to the DBU Jutland, the regional body of football in Jutland. The team plays its home matches at Sparekassen Thy Arena, formerly known as 'Lerpytter Stadion', where it has been based since its foundation in 1989.

Former footballer Jesper Grønkjær, who played for Chelsea and Atlético Madrid, amongst others, began his career in the Thisted FC youth academy.

== Players ==
=== First-team squad ===
As of 6 September 2026

Note: Flags indicate national team as defined under FIFA eligibility rules; some limited exceptions apply. Players may hold more than one non-FIFA nationality.

No.	Pos.	Nation	Player
1	GK	DEN	Andreas Raahauge
2	DF	DEN	Oliver Andreasen
3	FW	DEN	Victor Fjeldgaard
5	DF	DEN	Malthe Gyldenløve-Lyebalk
6	FW	DEN	Jakob Gaardsøe
7	MF	DEN	André Escobar Jensen (on loan from Brøndby)
8	DF	DEN	Kristoffer Andersen
9	MF	DEN	Mathias Andersen
11	MF	DEN	Georg Gjesing
15	GK	DEN	Simon Stricker
16	DF	POR	Alex Marques
17	DF	DEN	Nikolai Ankerstjerne

No.	Pos.	Nation	Player
18	DF	DEN	Felix Skovholm
19	FW	DEN	Jetmir Beluli
20	MF	GHA	Simon Appiah
21	MF	USA	Jean-Julien Foe-Nuphaus
22	FW	DEN	Valdemar Engstrøm
23	MF	DEN	Asger Bust
24	DF	DEN	Emil Lagergaard
25	DF	DEN	Karl Grønkjær
26	DF	DEN	Mikkel Overgaard
27	FW	DEN	Lucas Vestergaard
29	GK	DEN	Markus Riis
33	DF	DEN	Jeppe Dalgaard

=== Former players ===
- (Brazil) Renato De Vecchi
- (Russia) Mark Ryutin
- (Denmark) Jesper Grønkjær
