= Clayton Soares =

Brazilian footballer (born 1978)

Personal information
- Full name: Clayton Soares do Nascimento
- Date of birth: November 24, 1978 (age 47)
- Place of birth: Brazil
- Position: Striker

Senior career*
| Years | Team | Apps | (Gls) |
| 1998 | Madureira | | |
| 1999 | Mesquita | | |
| 2000–2001 | Serrano | | |
| 2002 | 07 Vestur | | |
| 2003–2009 | B71 | | |
| 2010 | FC Hoyvík | | |
| 2011 | 07 Vestur | 26 | (15) |
| 2012–2016 | ÍF | 125 | (55) |
| 2017– | B71 | | |
- * Club domestic league appearances and goals

Clayton Soares do Nascimento (born 24 November 1978) is a Brazilian footballer who plays as a striker for B71.

== Early life ==
He is a native of Rio de Janeiro, Brazil.

== Career ==
He started his career with Brazilian side Madureira. In 1999, he signed for Brazilian side Mesquita. In 2000, he signed for Brazilian side Serrano. In 2002, he signed for Faroese side 07 Vestur. In 2003, he signed for Faroese side B71. In 2010, he signed for Faroese side FC Hoyvík. In 2011, he returned to Faroese side 07 Vestur. In 2012, he signed for Faroese side ÍF. He was the top scorer of the 2012 Faroe Islands Premier League. In 2017, he returned to Faroese side B71.

== Style of play ==
He mainly operates as a striker. He has been described as "has the golden ability to slide into the right position at the right time". He operated as a left-back early in his career.

== Personal life ==
He has worked at a fish-packing factory. He has been married and has a son.
