= Pætur Dam Jacobsen =

Faroese footballer (born 1982)

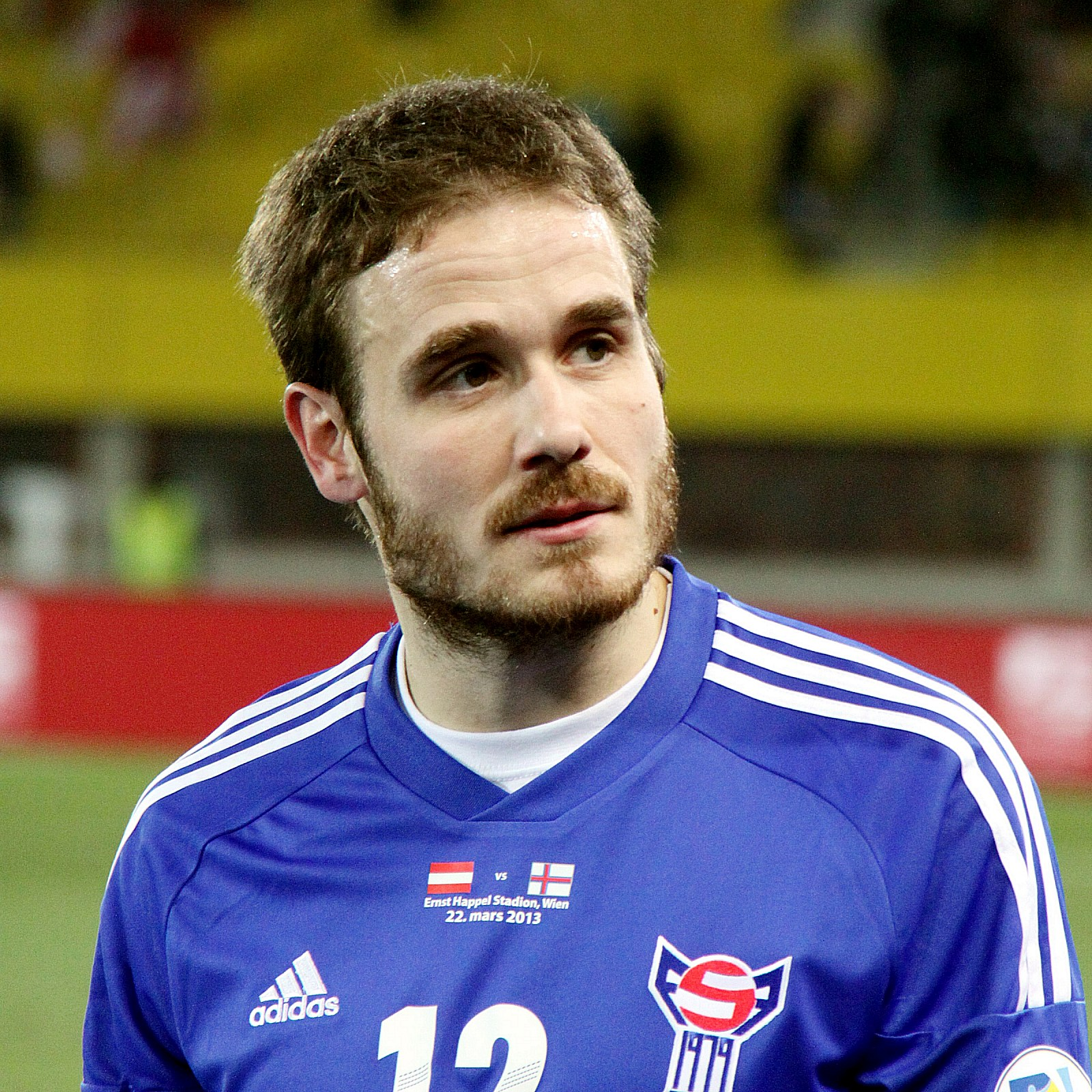
- Jacobsen in 2013.

Personal information
- Full name: Pætur Dam Jacobsen
- Date of birth: 5 December 1982 (age 43)
- Place of birth: Tórshavn, Faroe Islands
- Height: 1.70 m (5 ft 7 in)
- Position: Midfielder

Team information
- Current team: Skála ÍF
- Number: 24

Senior career*
Years	Team	Apps	(Gls)
2001	Havnar Bóltfelag	3	(0)
2001–2004	Argja Bóltfelag	52	(17)
2005–2008	Skála	99	(12)
2009–2013	EB/Streymur	101	(11)
2014–	Skála	95	(13)

International career^{‡}
2008–2013	Faroe Islands	3	(0)
- * Club domestic league appearances and goals as of 08:17, 28 March 2018 (UTC) ‡ National team caps and goals as of 08:17, 28 March 2018 (UTC)

Pætur Dam Jacobsen (born 5 December 1982) is a Faroese international footballer who plays for Skála, as a midfielder.

== Career ==
Born in Tórshavn, Jacobsen has played club football for Havnar Bóltfelag, Argja Bóltfelag, Skála, and EB/Streymur.

He made his international debut for Faroe Islands in 2008.
