= Eli Nielsen =

Faroese footballer (born 1992)

Eli F. Nielsen
Personal information
- Full name: Eli Falkvard Nielsen
- Date of birth: 23 September 1992 (age 34)
- Place of birth: Sandavágur, Faroe Islands
- Position: Midfielder

Team information
- Current team: B36 Tórshavn
- Number: 6

Senior career*
Years	Team	Apps	(Gls)
2008–2011	07 Vestur	78	(4)
2012	HB	7	(0)
2013	07 Vestur	25	(0)
2014–	B36 Tórshavn	228	(13)

International career^{‡}
2008	Faroe Islands U17	3	(0)
2009–2010	Faroe Islands U19	6	(0)
2013	Faroe Islands U21	1	(0)
2019	Faroe Islands	1	(0)
- * Club domestic league appearances and goals as of 26 October 2025 ‡ National team caps and goals as of 00:07, 13 October 2019 (UTC)

Eli Falkvard Nielsen (born 23 September 1992) is a Faroese footballer who play as a midfielder for B36 Tórshavn and the Faroe Islands national team.

== Career ==
Nielsen made his international debut for the Faroe Islands on 12 October 2019 in a UEFA Euro 2020 qualifying match against Romania, which finished as a 0–3 home loss. The last couple of years he has been suffering with knee and Achilles tendon injuries. When he didn't play in the whole year of 2024 it was likely that his career was over, but then he announced a comeback for the 2025 season.

== Career statistics ==
=== International ===
As of 12 October 2019

Faroe Islands
Year	Apps	Goals
2019	1	0
Total	1	0
