= Bjarki Nielsen =

Faroese footballer (born 1998)

Personal information
- Full name: Bjarki Christiansson Nielsen
- Date of birth: 2 November 1998 (age 27)
- Place of birth: Tórshavn, Faroe Islands
- Position: Winger

Team information
- Current team: AB Argir
- Number: 7

Youth career
- AB Argir

Senior career*
Years	Team	Apps	(Gls)
2016–2020	AB Argir	121	(40)
2021–2024	B36 Tórshavn	163	(31)
2025	AB Argir		

International career^{‡}
2019–2020	Faroe Islands U21	2	(0)
- * Club domestic league appearances and goals as of 1 June 2025 ‡ National team caps and goals as of 11:00, 1 March 2024 (UTC)

Bjarki Nielsen (born 2 November 1998) is a Faroese footballer who plays as a winger for AB Argir.

In 2020, he moved from AB Argir to B36 Tórshavn, where he established himself as a significant player. He also became a fan favourite, and in 2023 he was honoured as player of the year by the B36 supporters. After a rather disappointing 2024 season, he decided to return to AB Argir

== Career ==
Bjarki Nielsen started his senior career in 2016 in AB Argir, where he also had played as a youth. He played there for five seasons before moving to B36 Tórshavn, where he now is one of the leading players. In 2023 the B36 Tórshavn fan's appointed him the player of the year.

Bjarki Nielsen made his international debut for the Faroe Islands U21 on 6 September 2019 in a UEFA Euro 2020 qualifying match against Montenegro, which finished as a 3–0 away loss.

Today Bjarki Nielsen is the captain of his youth club AB Argir.
