= B68 Toftir II =

Faroese football club

- Full name: Tofta Ítróttarfelag, B68 II
- Nickname(s): Reyðir (The Reds)
- Founded: 21 December 1962; 62 years ago
- Ground: Svangaskard; Toftir, Faroes
- Capacity: 6.000
- Chairman: Jógvan Højgaard
- Manager: Øssur Hansen
- League: 2. deild
- 2023: 1. deild, 9th of 10 (relegated)
Home colours	Away colours

B68 Toftir II is a Faroese football team, playing in the village of Toftir, Faroe Islands. It is the reserve team of the Faroese Premier League club, B68 Toftir and like most reserve teams, the best players are sent up to the senior team, meanwhile developing other players for further call-ups. Like the senior team, B68 Toftir II play their home games at Svangaskarð.

Reserve teams in Faroe Islands play in the same league system as the senior team, rather than in a reserve team league. They cannot play in the same division as their senior team, however, so B68 Toftir II is ineligible for promotion to the Faroese Premier League and cannot play in the Faroese Cup.

== Current squad ==
As of September 13, 2012 Note: Flags indicate national team as defined under FIFA eligibility rules; some limited exceptions apply. Players may hold more than one non-FIFA nationality.

No.	Pos.	Nation	Player
1	GK	(Faroe Islands) FRO	Mads Nesá
26	GK	(Faroe Islands) FRO	Ragnar Lindholm
20	DF	(Faroe Islands) FRO	Aron Højgaard
5	DF	(Faroe Islands) FRO	Ari Johannesen
19	DF	(Faroe Islands) FRO	Jóhan Petur Petersen
15	DF	(Faroe Islands) FRO	Dánjal Pauli Højgaard
6	DF	(Faroe Islands) FRO	Niklas Poulsen (captain)
21	DF	(Faroe Islands) FRO	Arthur Højgaard
16	DF	(Faroe Islands) FRO	Otto R. Petersen
3	MF	(Faroe Islands) FRO	Ovi Brim
4	MF	(Faroe Islands) FRO	Høgni Hansen
17	MF	(Faroe Islands) FRO	Fróði Johannesen

No.	Pos.	Nation	Player
7	MF	(Faroe Islands) FRO	Emil Ronaldsson (vice-captain)
8	MF	(Faroe Islands) FRO	Haraldur R. Højgaard
14	MF	(Faroe Islands) FRO	Hákun Edmundsson
11	MF	(Faroe Islands) FRO	Ramon Højgaard
5	MF	(Faroe Islands) FRO	Gunnar Johannessen
10	FW	(Faroe Islands) FRO	Esmar Clementsen
10	FW	(Faroe Islands) FRO	Óli Højgaard Olsen
15	FW	(Faroe Islands) FRO	Trúgvi Kjeld
9	FW	(Faroe Islands) FRO	Búi í Hjøllum
14	FW	(Faroe Islands) FRO	Uni S. Djurhuus

== Staff ==
- Manager: (Faroe Islands) Øssur Hansen
- Coach: (Faroe Islands) Oddmar Andreassen
- Coach: (Faroe Islands) Ovi Brim
- Coach: (Faroe Islands) Jóhan Petur Poulsen
- Team chief: (Faroe Islands) Trúgvi Súnason í Hjøllum

== See also ==
- B68 Toftir
