= Hilmar Leon Jakobsen =

Faroese footballer

Personal information
- Full name: Hilmar Leon Jakobsen
- Date of birth: 2 August 1997 (age 29)
- Place of birth: Faroe Islands
- Position: Forward

Youth career
- –2015: HB
- 2018: HB

Senior career*
Years	Team	Apps	(Gls)
2013–2015	HB	2	(1)
2014–2015	HB II	18	(8)
2020–2022	HB II	4	(5)
2020–2022	HB	46	(18)

International career
2013	Faroe Islands U17	9	(0)
2014	Faroe Islands U19	2	(0)
2020	Faroe Islands	3	(0)
- * Club domestic league appearances and goals

Hilmar Leon Jakobsen (born 2 August 1997) is a Faroese retired footballer who played as a forward.

== Career ==
=== Club ===
Jakobsen has played football as well as handball, as a handball player he played for the Faroese club H71 and the national team. He played football as a young boy for HB Tórshavn for the U18 from 2013 to 2015 and for the U21 team in 2018, but due to injuries he chose to play handball instead of football. In June 2020 HB Tórshavn had several players who could not play because of injuries, so they asked Hilmar Leon Jakobsen if he could help them. He played at first in the second best division three matches, the first one was on 15 June 2020. On 4 July he played his first match for the first time in several years in the top tier. On 20 August the same year he played a match for HB Tórshavn in Europa League. Four months after his shift from handball to football and his first match for HB Tórshavn in the top tier for several years, he had his debut for the Faroe Islands national team.

On November 18, 2022, 25-year-old Jakobsen, who had not played since May due to injuries, confirmed that he was forced to retire from his career as his body could no longer cope with the numerous injuries.

=== International ===
Jakobsen made his international debut for the Faroe Islands on 11 November 2020 in a friendly match against Lithuania.

== Career statistics ==
=== International ===
As of 18 November 2020

Faroe Islands
Year	Apps	Goals
2020	3	0
Total	3	0
