= Finnur Justinussen =

Faroese footballer (born 1989)

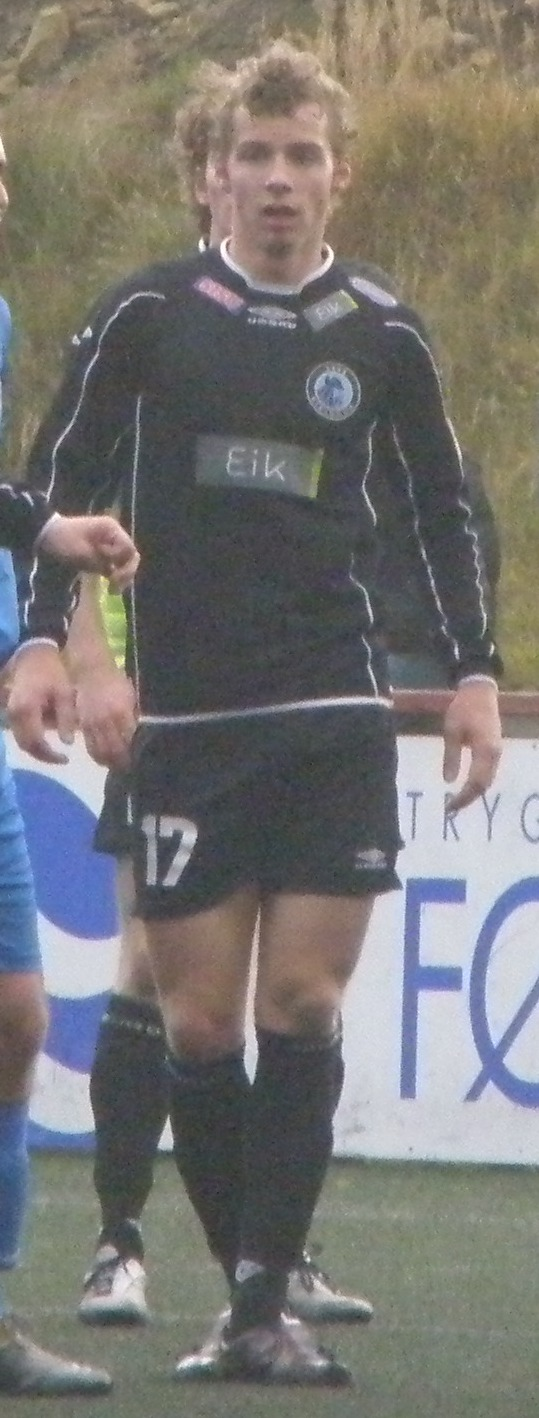

Personal information
- Full name: Finnur Justinussen
- Date of birth: 30 March 1989 (age 37)
- Place of birth: Tórshavn, Faroe Islands
- Height: 1.85 m (6 ft 1 in)
- Position: Forward

Team information
- Current team: Víkingur
- Number: 17

Youth career
- GÍ Gøta

Senior career*
Years	Team	Apps	(Gls)
2007	GÍ Gøta	7	(0)
2008–2011	Víkingur	89	(47)
2012–2013	Jönköpings Södra	3	(0)
2013–2015	Víkingur	77	(50)
2016	Fremad Amager	5	(2)
2016–2017	Víkingur	5	(1)
2017–2018	Fremad Amager	20	(3)
2018	→ Næstved BK (loan)	15	(11)
2018–2019	Næstved BK	17	(11)
2019	IF Føroyar		
2020	FC Roskilde	5	(0)
2020–	Víkingur	87	(32)

International career^{‡}
2009–2011	Faroe Islands U21	8	(0)
2012–	Faroe Islands	6	(0)
- * Club domestic league appearances and goals as of 30 October 2024 ‡ National team caps and goals as of April 18, 2023

Finnur Justinussen (born 30 March 1989) is a Faroese footballer who plays for Víkingur Gøta and the Faroe Islands national football team.

== Club career ==
He began his career with local club GÍ Gøta. After GÍ Gøta and Leirvík ÍF merged in 2008, he played for the newly formed club Víkingur. He scored 19 goals in the 2009 season, making him the league top goalscorer. During the 2010 season he scored 7 league goals and 3 in the Faroese Cup. In 2011, he was top scorer again, with 21 goals. Having previously been on trials with Swedish Allsvenskan clubs Örebro SK and Trelleborgs FF, Finnur trialed with Superettan club Jönköpings Södra IF in late 2011. After impressing on trial he signed a permanent deal with the club in early 2012. In 2013, he returned to Víkingur ahead of the 2013 season.

On 9 October 2015, Justinussen joined Danish 2nd Division-side Fremad Amager. Finnur was loaned out to Næstved BK from January 2018 to June 2018, and then signed permanently for the club. He left the club on 29 January 2019 by mutual termination, because the trip from Copenhagen - where he lived - to Næstved, was too time-consuming. Afterwards, he joined IF Føroyar in Amager.

On 24 July 2019 it was announced that Justinussen had joined FC Roskilde. After only three months, on 25 October, he left the club by mutual agreement.

== International career ==
Justinussen made his U21 debut in September 2009, in a 1–1 draw with Moldova. He made 8 appearances in total for the U21 team, of which he played in they won two matches, two draws, and four defeats, which were all qualifying matches for the 2011 Under-21 tournament. Justinussen was involved in the wins against Latvia and Andorra, but didn't feature in the 1–0 win over Russia.

He was called up to the Faroe Islands national team for the first time in September 2011, for the matches against Italy and Serbia. He was left out the matchday squad for the game against Italy, but was an unused substitute in the match verses Serbia. He made his debut for the team in August 2012 as a substitute, in a 2–0 loss to Iceland in Reykjavík.
