= Gundadalur =

Sports facility in Tórshavn, Faroe Islands

Coordinates: 62.019349°N 6.781139°W

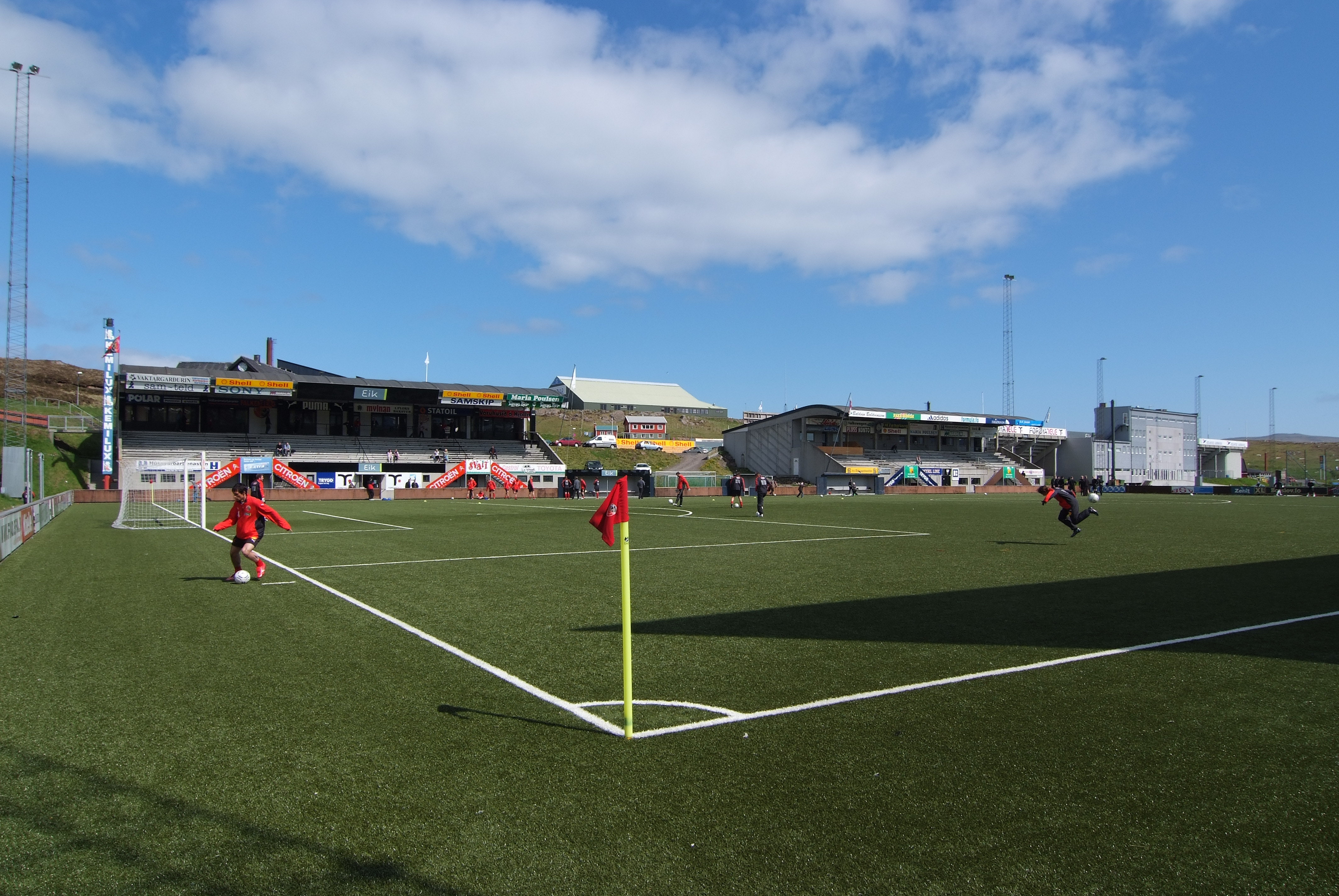
- Interactive map of Gundadalur
- Full name: Gundadalur
- Location: Tórshavn, Faroe Islands
- Capacity: 5,000 (all-seater)
- Field size: 100 m × 65 m (109 yd × 71 yd)

Construction
- Built: 1909
- Opened: 1911

Tenants
- HB and B36 (Ovari vøllur); Giza/Hoyvík and Undrið FF (Niðari vøllur)

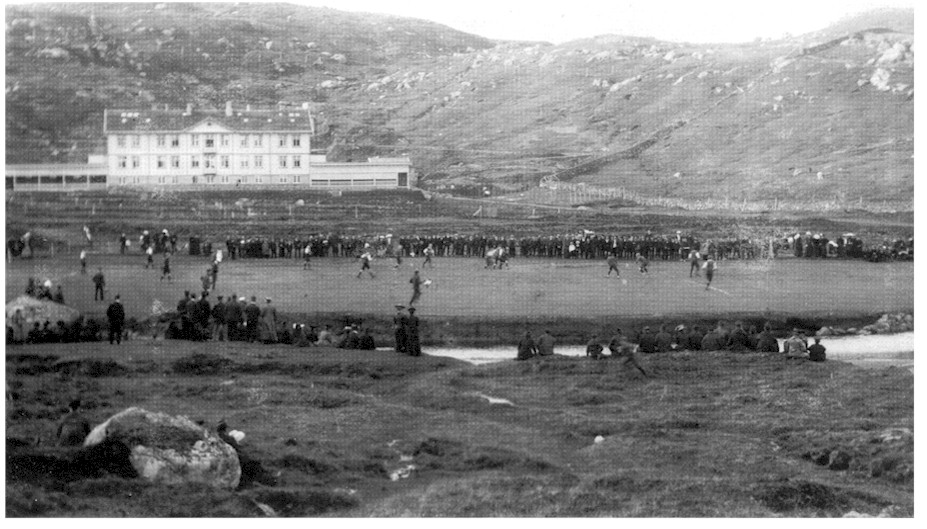
Hoydalar, 18 July 1909: First known photo of a football match between two clubs of the Faroe Islands. HB Tórshavn (white arms) won 3-1 over TB Tvøroyri.

Gundadalur is a sports complex in Tórshavn, Faroe Islands. It is home to three different football pitches and other sports facilities. The largest one is the national stadium Tórsvøllur, a multi-use stadium.

== Overview ==
The actual Gundadalur Stadium is located just alongside Tórsvøllur. It was opened in 1911. There are two sports halls in the same area. Høllin á Hálsi is the oldest one; built in 1970, it is located just above Tórsvøllur. The sports hall has been owned by Tórshavn Municipality since 2004. Gundadalshøllin is the other sports hall, lying below and south of Høllin á Hálsi. Both sports halls are mainly used for handball and volleyball, but also for other public events, not related to sports. Gundadalshøllin is owned by the handball clubs Neistin and Kyndil, and the volleyball club Fleyr. There is also a swimming hall in Gundadalur that was built in 1984. It has one swimming pool which is 25 meters long with six lanes, and it has three other pools: one deep, and two not-so-deep pools which are mainly for children. There is a gymnastics venue inside a hall at the north-eastern side of Tórsvøllur; it is called Fimi and is owned by Tórshavn Municipality. Outside the western corner of the Gundadalur Stadium is a sportshall for badminton, it is called Badmintonhøllin. North of the badminton hall is a tennis venue. Just outside the valley of Gundadalur is a venue for athletics, named Tórsbreyt.

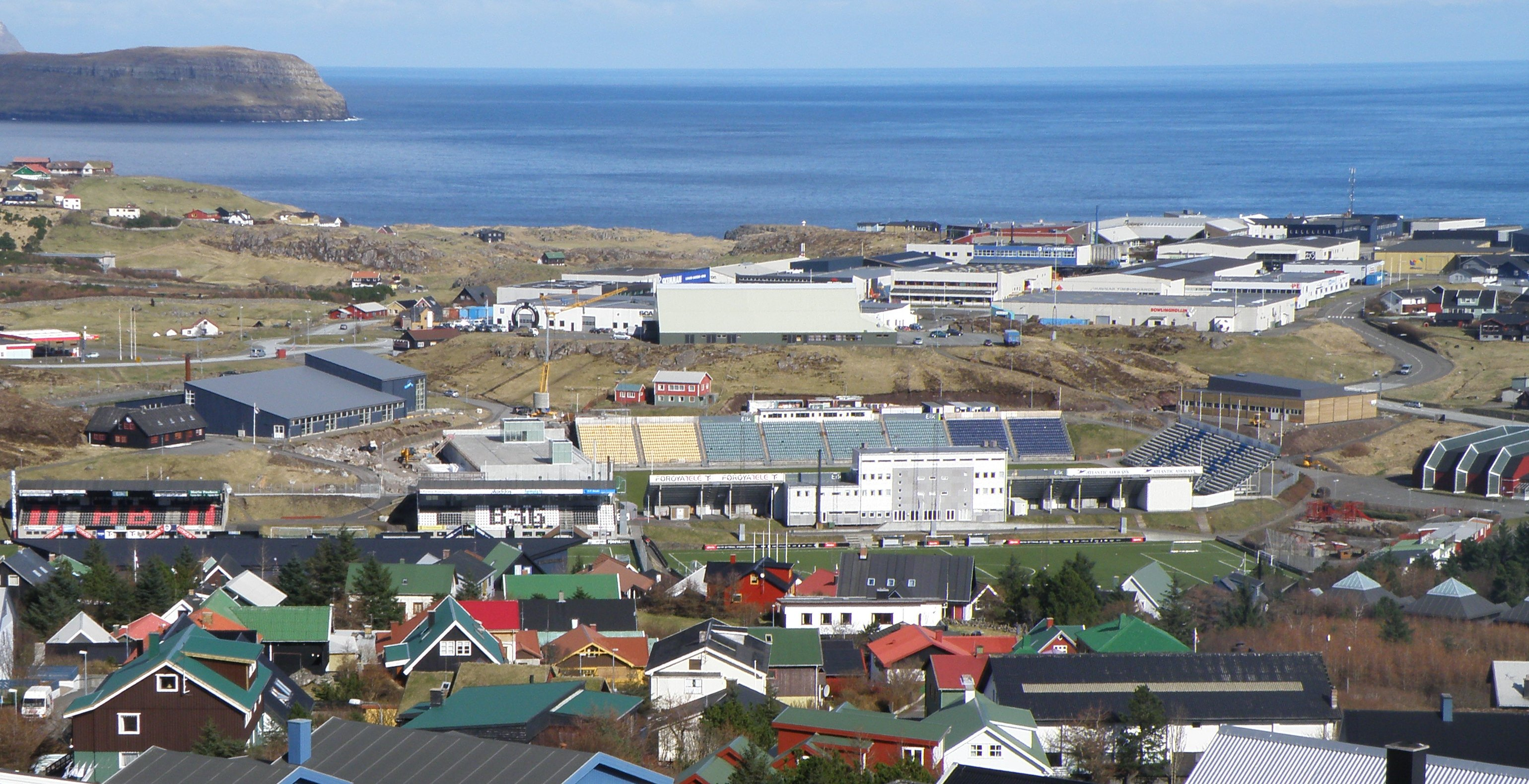
View to Gundadalur and Hálsi, the sports area of Tórshavn.

== Ovari vøllur ==
The Upper Field (Ovari vøllur) is the main field used for first level matches and is the home ground of HB and B36. It can also host the matches of other Faroese teams in the European competitions.

== Niðari vøllur ==
The Lower Field (Niðari vøllur), is mostly used for training and also lower level matches. Is the home ground of Giza/Hoyvík and Undrið FF.

== Attendances ==
Tenants	League season	Average attendance
Havnar Bóltfelag	2024	629
Havnar Bóltfelag	2023	514
Havnar Bóltfelag	2022	514
