= Undrið FF =

Faroese football team

- Full name: Undrið Fótbóltsfelag
- Founded: 18 January 2006
- Ground: Hoyvík
- Capacity: 500
- Chairman: Arnar Lognberg
- Manager: Hegga Samuelsen
- League: 1. deild
- 2022: 6th, 1. deild
Home colours	Away colours

Undrið FF is a Faroese football team based in the capital Tórshavn. The team also plays at the Hoyvíkvøllur. The club was founded 18 January 2006, under the name Undrið FF. This makes the team one of the youngest member of the Faroe Islands Football Association.

== History ==
Club logo 2006–2010.

The idea to found the new football team began with a birthday party in 2005.

In the 2021 season, the team cruise-controlled through the season, gaining promotion to the 1. Deild for the first time in the club's history. This was the first season that chairman, Arnar Lognberg, was in charge of the team for a full calendar year.

== Name ==
The team is named after its first team sponsor, the Faroese representative of the Icelandic soap producer Undri, which means wonder in Icelandic. It means the same in the Faroese language, however a definite article is added making it Undrið, but the Faroese pronunciation remains the same. (In Icelandic, they would be different).

== Honours ==
- 2. deild: 1
  - 2021 (Manager Arnar Lognberg)
- 3. deild: 1
  - 2017 (Manager Arnar Lognberg)

== Current squad ==
Note: Flags indicate national team as defined under FIFA eligibility rules; some limited exceptions apply. Players may hold more than one non-FIFA nationality.

No.	Pos.	Nation	Player
1	GK	(Faroe Islands) FRO	Petur Petersen
22	GK	(Faroe Islands) FRO	Terji Brynjarssonn
16	GK	(Faroe Islands) FRO	Fródi í Gardi
3	CB	(Faroe Islands) FRO	Frídi Magnussen
4	CB	(Faroe Islands) FRO	Bjarni Olsen
20	CB	(Faroe Islands) FRO	Sverri Hansson
5	RB	(Faroe Islands) FRO	Dánjal Hansen
2	RB	(Faroe Islands) FRO	Jónas Bech (Vice-Captain)
11	LB	(Faroe Islands) FRO	John í Innistovu
17	LB	(Faroe Islands) FRO	Fríði á Borg
6	CM	(Faroe Islands) FRO	Ólavur Venned (Captain)
77	CM	(Faroe Islands) FRO	Rodar Hedinsson
30	CM	(Faroe Islands) FRO	Hans Sejer Tummasarson
19	CM	(Faroe Islands) FRO	Kristian Eliasen
10	CAM	(Faroe Islands) FRO	Rói av Fløtum
7	RW	(Faroe Islands) FRO	Rói Jacobsen
18	RW	(Faroe Islands) FRO	Súni Højgaard
24	LW	(Faroe Islands) FRO	Pætur Rein
13	LW	(Faroe Islands) FRO	Tóki Næs Rasmussen
21	LW	(Faroe Islands) FRO	Petur Ovi Hjaltalin Dam
8	FW	(Faroe Islands) FRO	Sjúrður Jensen
14	FW	(Faroe Islands) FRO	Dávid K Dam
9	ST	(Faroe Islands) FRO	Petur Frank Holm

== Team records ==
- Biggest win: Undri FF – Víkingur 3. deild 16–1
- Biggest defeat: ÍF – Undri FF 11–1
- Most goals: Sjúrður Jensen
- Most matches: Mikkjal Christiansen
- Most goals in one match: Christian V. Jacobsen, 6 goals
- Longest Clean Sheet: Terji Brynarsson
- Most times captain: Mikkjal Christiansen
