= FC Hoyvík (2019) =

Faroese football club

- Full name: FC Hoyvík
- Founded: 2011
- Ground: Hoyvíksvøllur, Hoyvík
- Capacity: 1,069
- Chairman: Kenneth Hovgaard Djurhuus
- Manager: Ákji Johannesen
- League: 1. deild
- 2025: 2. deild, 2nd of 11 (promoted)
Home colours	Away colours

FC Hoyvík is a Faroese football club founded in 2011 after the merger of FF Giza and the original FC Hoyvík. Initially it was known as Giza Hoyvík but was renamed to FC Hoyvík after 2018 season and since 2019 was known as FC Hoyvík. The club is based in Hoyvík, and play their home matches in Hoyvíksvøllur.

== History ==
Club's former logo when it was called Giza Hoyvík.

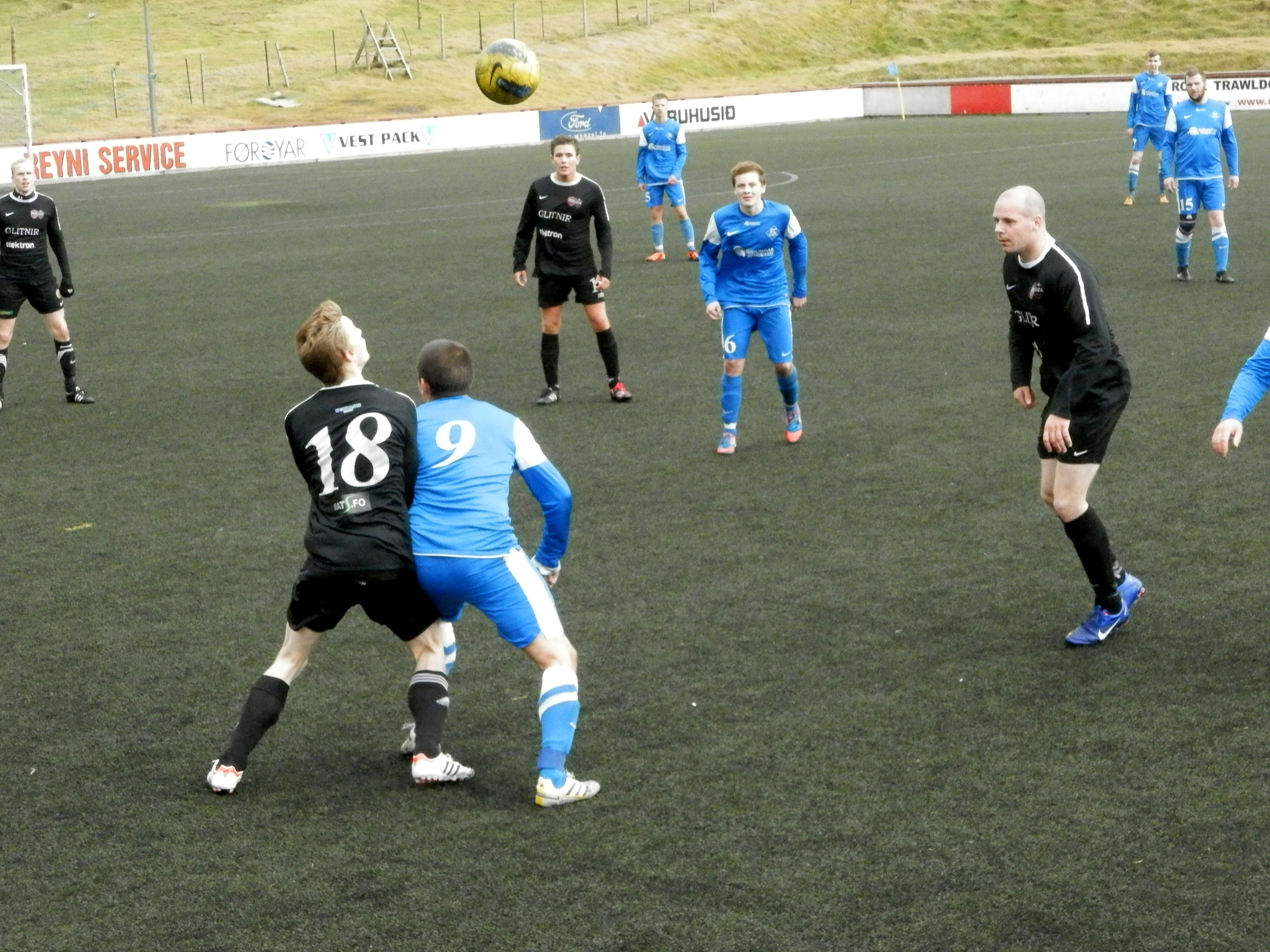
Giza/Hoyvík vs. FC Suðuroy II in September 2012.

In their first season, they played in 2. deild and finished 3rd losing the promotion on goal difference. In 2013 and 2014 they finished 3rd again, finally achieving promotion to the second tier in 2015. They spent three seasons in 1. deild, being relegated back to 2. deild in 2018. After the end of the 2018 season, the club announced it would be renamed to FC Hoyvík.

The club played its home matches in Gundadalur's second field until June 2017, when Hoyvíksvøllur (also called J&K vøllur because of sponsorship reasons) was opened. Its first match in the new field was a 4–1 win against TB/FCS/Royn II.

=== Performances ===
Season	League	Pos.	P	W	D	L	GD	Pts.	Cup	Topscorer (League)
2012	2. deild (Level 3)	3rd	18	12	4	2	64–33	40	First round (1/8)	(Faroe Islands) Poul Kjartan Dam (16 goals)
2013	2. deild (Level 3)	3rd	18	13	0	5	50–24	39	First round (1/8)	(Faroe Islands) Tróndur Arge (7 goals)
2014	2. deild (Level 3)	3rd	18	10	2	6	56–27	32	First round (1/8)	(Faroe Islands) Tróndur Arge (9 goals)
2015	2. deild (Level 3)	2nd	18	12	1	5	60–26	37	Quarter-finals	(Senegal) Ahmed Keita (16 goals)
2016	1. deild (Level 2)	4th	27	15	3	9	60–40	48	Quarter-finals	(Senegal) Ahmed Keita (22 goals)
2017	1. deild (Level 2)	7th	27	9	9	9	50–48	36	First round (1/8)	(Senegal) Ahmed Keita (11 goals)
2018	1. deild (Level 2)	9th	27	7	5	15	37–49	26	First round (1/8)	(Faroe Islands) Hugin Ferber (7 goals)
2019	2. deild (Level 3)	1st	18	15	2	1	68–25	47	Preliminary round	(Faroe Islands) Hugin Ferber (13 goals)

== Honours ==
- 2. deild
  - Champions (1): 2019

== Current squad ==
Note: Flags indicate national team as defined under FIFA eligibility rules; some limited exceptions apply. Players may hold more than one non-FIFA nationality.

No.	Pos.	Nation	Player
1	GK	FRO	Mortan Vang
3	DF	FRO	Ingmar Dam
4	DF	FRO	Poul Thomas Dam
5	DF	FRO	Teitur Jóanesarson (captain)
6	MF	FRO	Pætur Rein
7	FW	FRO	Tór av Skarði
8	FW	FRO	Tróndur Arge
9	MF	FRO	Óli Hansen
10	FW	SEN	Ahmed Keita
11	MF	FRO	Niklas Fríði Jacobsen
12	DF	FRO	Ragnar Rasmussen
14	MF	FRO	Vagnar Poulsen
15	MF	FRO	Tummas Eli Viderø
16	MF	FRO	Andrias Dam

No.	Pos.	Nation	Player
17	DF	FRO	Petur Mikkelsen
18	MF	FRO	Jóhan Hansen
19	DF	FRO	Svenn Jacobsen
20	MF	FRO	Kristin Mouritsen
26	DF	FRO	Vensil Djurhuus
28	FW	FRO	Aaron Nolsøe Thorgeirsson
42	GK	SRB	Predrag Marković
80	FW	FRO	Hugin Ferber
—	MF	FRO	Mathias Schou
—	MF	FRO	Bogi Hermansen
—	MF	FRO	Elias Evensson
—	DF	FRO	Filip Hansen
—	MF	FRO	Sjúrður Arnason
—	FW	FRO	Jóannes Iversen
