= Víkingur Gøta =

Víkingur
- Full name: Víkingur
- Nickname: Vikings
- Founded: January 14, 2008; 18 years ago
- Ground: Sarpugerði Stadium; Gøta, Faroe Islands
- Capacity: 1,600 (440 seated)
- Chairman: Brandur Jacobsen
- Manager: Jóhan Petur Poulsen
- League: Faroe Islands Premier League
- 2025: Faroe Islands Premier League, 4th of 10
- Website: www.vikingur.fo
Home colours	Away colours

Víkingur is a Faroese professional football club based in Leirvík. The club was founded in 2008 after the merger of GÍ Gøta and Leirvík ÍF. They play at the Sarpugerði Stadium in Norðragøta. Both villages are part of the same municipality Eysturkommuna, located on the island of Eysturoy and about 5 kilometers away from each other. The club won the Faroese championship for the first time in the 2016 season. In the 2017 season, Vikingur won the championship again.

== History ==
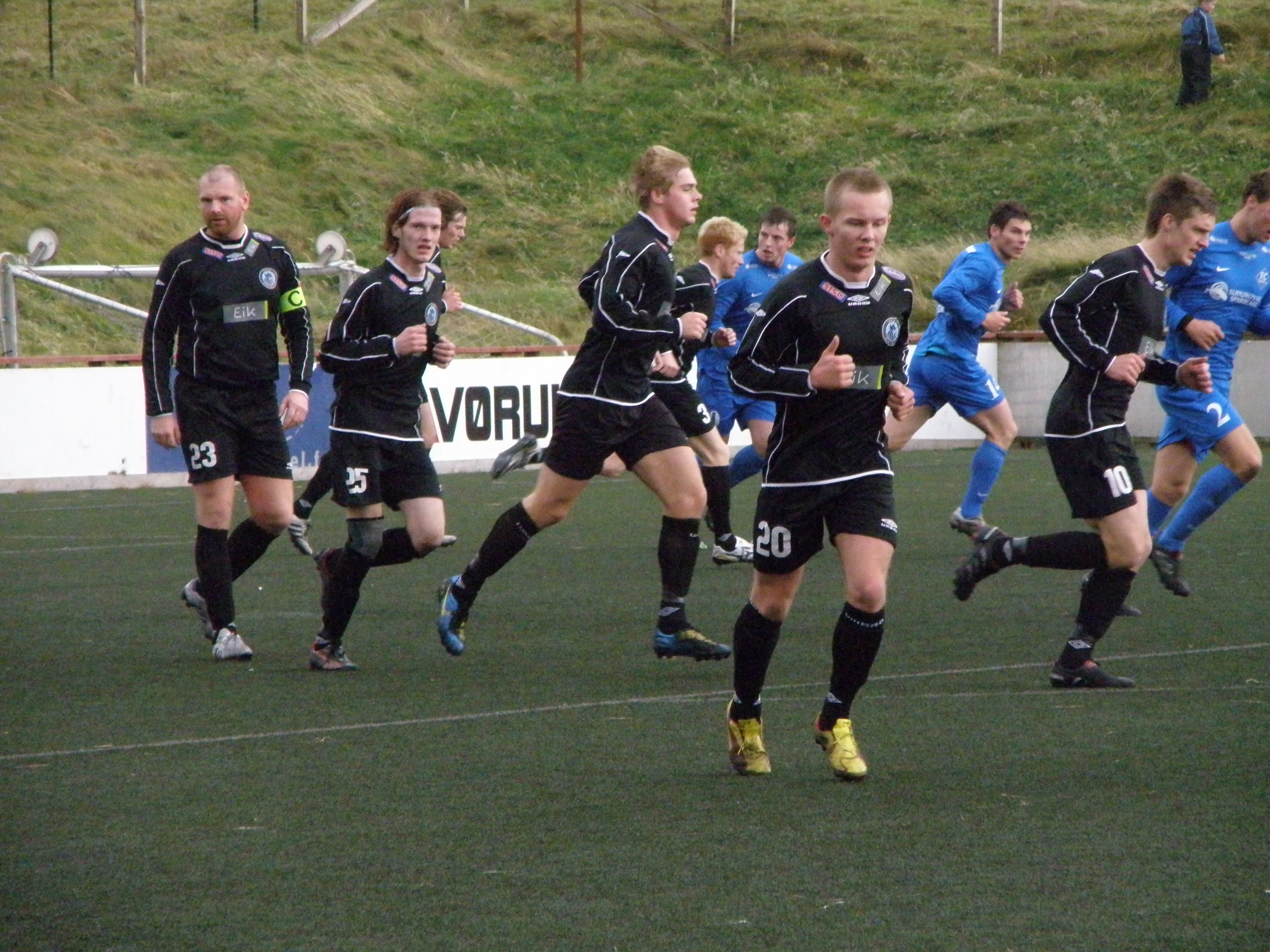
Víkingur Gøta in a match in Vodafonedeildin against FC Suðuroy in October 2010. They used their away colours (black).

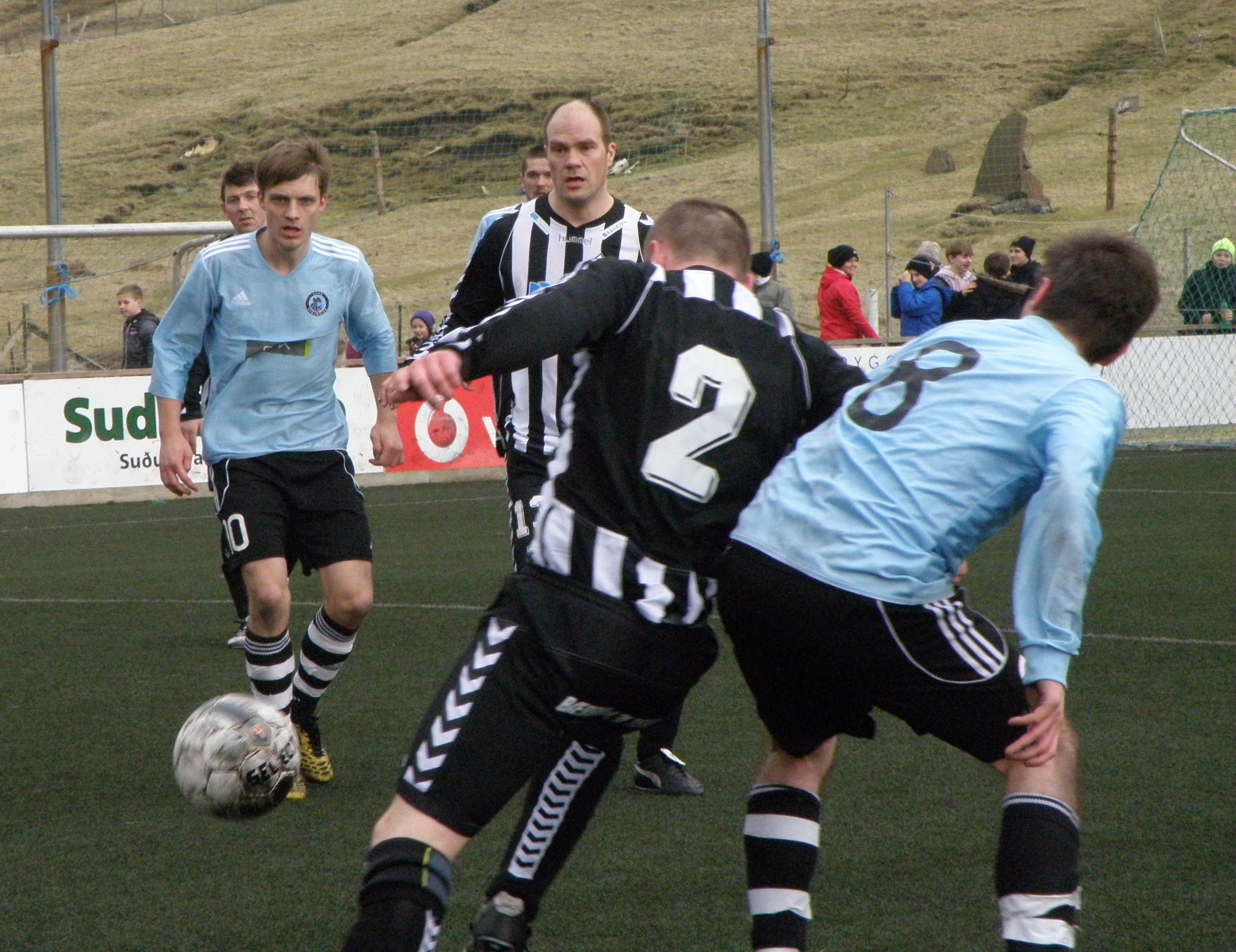
Víkingur Gøta vs. TB Tvøroyri in March 2012. Sølvi Vatnhamar and Óli Johannesen.

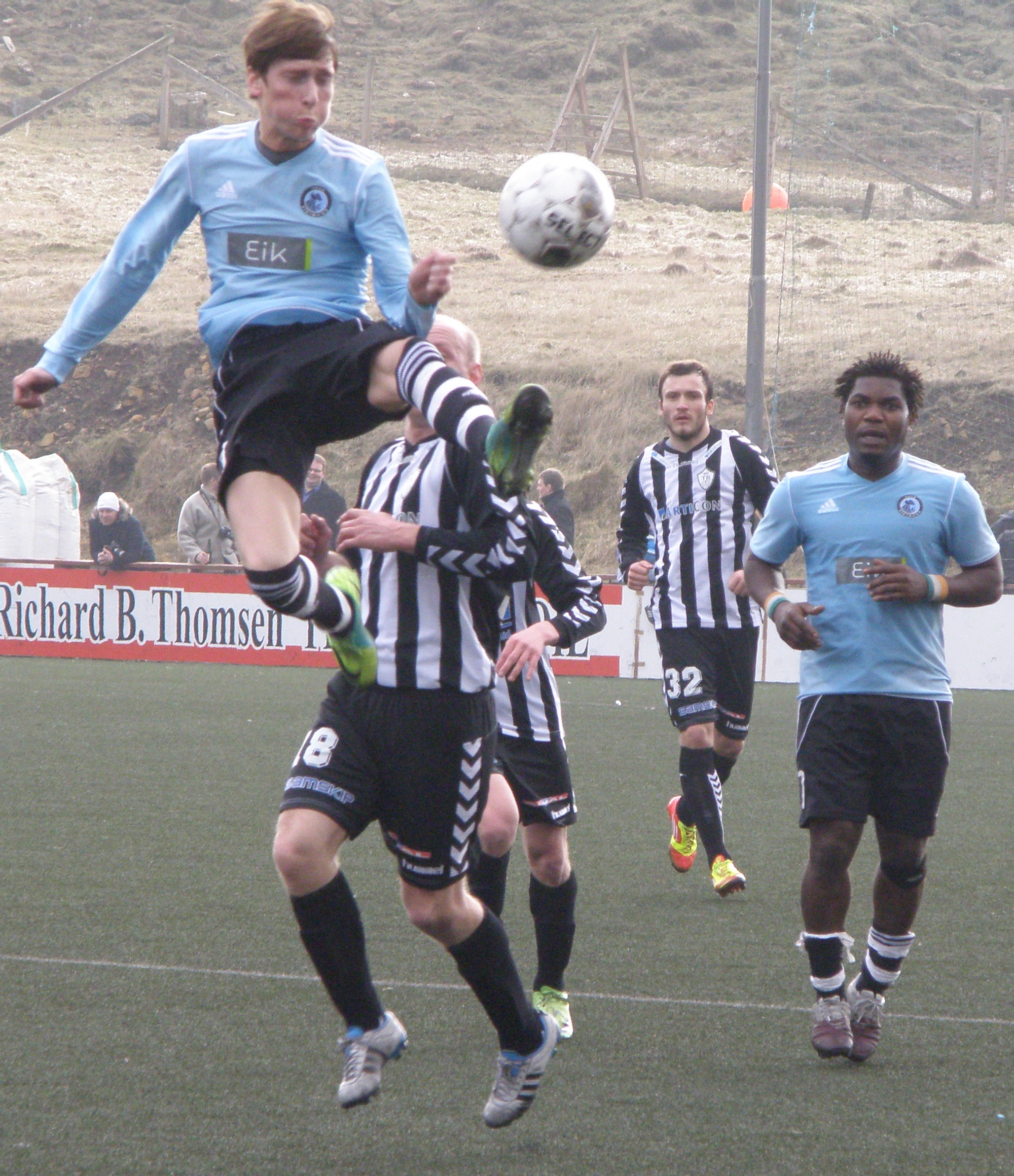
Víkingur Gøta vs. TB Tvøroyri in March 2012, Effodeildin.

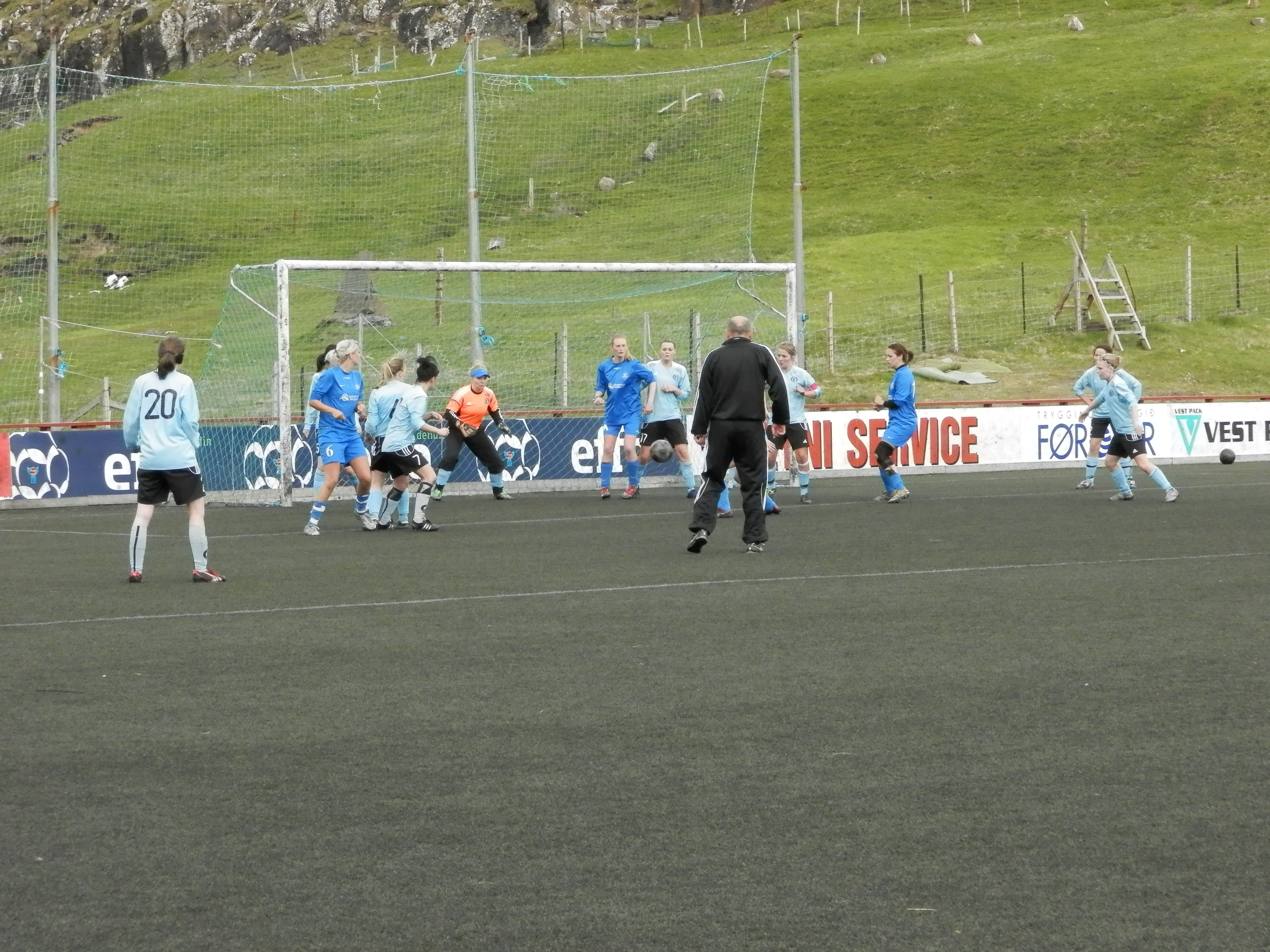
Víkingur Gøta has also female football, this photo is from 1 July 2012. Football match between Víkingur Gøta and FC Suðuroy.

Víkingur was founded on 14 January 2008 with the merger of first division GÍ Gøta and second division club Leirvík ÍF. The clubs from two villages linked by a 2.2 km tunnel through a mountain named the new club in honour to Tróndur í Gøtu, a Viking chief from around 1,000 years ago who lived in the settlement that bears his name, and Leirvik which has also Viking origins. First contacts for a merger of the two clubs date back to 2006, but only in summer 2007 drafts for a merger started. On 14 January 2008 in front of 180 members in Leirvik, the merger was decided with the temporary name of a combination of the previous clubs: GÍ/LÍF. Finally, on 4 February, the new name Víkingur was announced, as the best choice out of 18 name proposals.

Víkingur debuted in the Vodafonedeildin on 31 March 2008. The first match was a meeting at home against B68 Toftir, which Víkingur won with a 4–1 score. It was a mixed season for them, with one of the highest points of the season was a 5–0 win at B71 Sandoy. They finished their debut season in a respectable 5th place. They went out of the Faroe Islands Cup at the first hurdle, the match against 07 Vestur was 1–1 after extra time and lost 4–2 in a Penalty shoot-out.

In the 2009 season, Víkingur finished 3rd in the league, three points ahead of NSÍ Runavík. In the Faroese Cup, they recorded a 5–0 win in the first round against MB Midvagur, in quarter-final Víkingur knocked out HB Torshavn defeating them 2–1. The cup run continued when they defeated ÍF over two legs, 1–0 away and 5–0 at home. Their opponents in the final were EB/Streymur, Víkingur were winning 2–1 in the second half against favourites EB/Streymur, when Finnur Justinussen scored with 3 minutes to go, to seal the win. EB managed to score a goal minutes later, but the match finished 3–2 and Víkingur won the trophy.

The success of the 2009 season meant Víkingur would get to play in the Europa League in the following season and play against the Faroese league winners in the Faroe Islands Super Cup. The match was against 20 time league champions HB Torshavn, on 14 March 2010. Víkingur lost the match 2–1 and missed out on their second piece of silverware. Víkingur were drawn against Turkish giants Beşiktaş, in the Europa League second qualifying round. Unsurprisingly Víkingur were beaten 3–0 in the first leg, at the BJK İnönü Stadium. The home leg didn't go any better and lost the match 4–0. In 2010, Víkingur made it to the semi-finals of the Faroese Cup, but missed out on a place in the final for a second year running after being beaten by rivals ÍF Fuglafjørður over two legs. In the league they finished the 2010 season in 5th place, narrowly missing out on a place in Europe. Víkingur's final match was at home against ÍF and a draw would have been enough for a place in the top 4, but they lost 3–1, finishing the season behind ÍF level on points and level on goal difference.

Víkingur finished 3rd in the 2011 league season, and were knocked out in the quarterfinals of the Faroese Cup against B68 Toftir, 4–2 on penalties after a 2–2 draw. The team played in UEFA Europa League for 2012–13 season, but was eliminated in the first qualifying round by Gomel of Belarus. In 2012, they were 5th in the league, but won the Cup for the 2nd time in its history. In 2013, the team lost the Super Cup and achieved their worst position in league, finishing 6th, but won the Cup once again, for the 3rd time and the 3rd against EB/Streymur, starting a little cup rivalry. That year they eliminated FC Inter Turku of Finland, winning the second leg away 1–0 and 2–1 on aggregate.

In 2014, they won the Super Cup and the Faroese Cup, both against HB Tórshavn, and finished 3rd in Effodeildin. But the great success of the season was reach the 3rd qualifying round of UEFA Europa League, when they eliminated FC Daugava of Latvia and Tromsø of Norway, being knocked out by Rijeka of Croatia.

== Achievements ==
- Faroe Islands Premier League: 3

2016, 2017, 2024

- Faroe Islands Cup: 7

2009, 2012, 2013, 2014, 2015, 2022, 2026

- Faroe Islands Super Cup: 5

2014, 2015, 2016, 2017, 2018

== Current squad ==
As of 15 August 2026

Note: Flags indicate national team as defined under FIFA eligibility rules; some limited exceptions apply. Players may hold more than one non-FIFA nationality.

No.	Pos.	Nation	Player
1	GK	FRO	Bárður á Reynatrøð
5	DF	FRO	Jákup Vilhelmsen
6	MF	FRO	Arnór Brandsson
7	MF	FRO	Jákup Johansen
8	MF	FRO	Aron Ellingsgaard Jarnskor
9	FW	FRO	Jørgen Nielsen
10	MF	FRO	Sølvi Vatnhamar (captain)
11	FW	DEN	Mikkel Hyllegaard
14	DF	FRO	Ingi Jonhardsson

No.	Pos.	Nation	Player
16	MF	FRO	Rósing Toyt
18	MF	FRO	Arnbjørn Svensson
19	MF	FRO	Jákup Martin Jarnskor
23	GK	FRO	Niklas Thomsen
24	DF	FRO	Jósef Gleðisheygg
27	FW	FRO	Rani Hansen
29	DF	FRO	Ingi Arngrímsson
34	FW	SRB	Filip Đorđević
77	FW	FRO	Kaj Leo í Bartalsstovu

=== Out on loan ===
Note: Flags indicate national team as defined under FIFA eligibility rules; some limited exceptions apply. Players may hold more than one non-FIFA nationality.

No.	Pos.	Nation	Player

== Managers ==
- (Faroe Islands) Anton Skoradal (2008)
- (Faroe Islands) Jógvan Martin Olsen (1 Jan 2009 – 1 July 2013)
- (Faroe Islands) Sigfríður Clementsen (1 July 2013 – 16 Sep 2016)
- (Faroe Islands) Sámal Erik Hentze (16 Sep 2016 – 1 Nov 2017)
- (Scotland) Maurice Ross (1 Nov 2017 -24 May 2018)
- (Faroe Islands) Sigfríður Clementsen (25 May 2018 )
- (Faroe Islands) Sámal Hentze (1 January 2019 – 27 October 2019)
- (Faroe Islands) Eyðun Klakstein (30 October 2019 – 1 September 2020)
- (Faroe Islands) Jóhan Petur Poulsen (1 September 2020 – )

== European record ==
In the 2014–15 season, the club reached the third qualifying round for the first time. They were the first Faroese team to get through two rounds of a UEFA club competition.

As of 16 July 2026

Competition	Pld	W	D	L	GF	GA	GD
UEFA Champions League	8	2	1	5	11	14	–3
UEFA Europa League	20	3	4	13	8	50	–42
UEFA Conference League	14	4	3	7	14	24	–10
Total	42	9	8	25	33	88	–55

=== Matches ===
Season	Competition	Round	Club	Home	Away	Aggregate
2010–11	UEFA Europa League	2Q	(Turkey) Beşiktaş	0–4	0–3	0–7
2012–13	UEFA Europa League	1Q	(Belarus) Gomel	0–6	0–4	0–10
2013–14	UEFA Europa League	1Q	(Finland) Inter Turku	1–1	1–0	2–1
2013–14	UEFA Europa League	2Q	(Romania) Petrolul Ploiești	0–4	0–3	0–7
2014–15	UEFA Europa League	1Q	(Latvia) Daugava	2–1	1–1	3–2
2014–15	UEFA Europa League	2Q	(Norway) Tromsø IL	0–0	2–1	2–1
2014–15	UEFA Europa League	3Q	(Croatia) Rijeka	1–5	0–4	1–9
2015–16	UEFA Europa League	1Q	(Norway) Rosenborg	0–2	0–0	0–2
2016–17	UEFA Europa League	1Q	(Latvia) Ventspils	0–2	0–2	0–4
2017–18	UEFA Champions League	1Q	(Kosovo) Trepça'89	2–1	4–1	6–2
2017–18	UEFA Champions League	2Q	(Iceland) FH	0–2	1–1	1–3
2018–19	UEFA Champions League	1Q	(Finland) HJK	1–2	1–3	2–5
2018–19	UEFA Europa League	2Q	(Georgia (country)) Torpedo Kutaisi	0–4	0–3	0–7
2022–23	UEFA Europa Conference League	1Q	(Gibraltar) Europa	1–0	2–1	3–1
2022–23	UEFA Europa Conference League	2Q	(Slovakia) DAC Dunajská Streda	0–2	0–2	0–4
2023–24	UEFA Europa Conference League	1Q	(Andorra) Inter Club d'Escaldes	1–1	1–2	2–3
2024–25	UEFA Conference League	1Q	(Latvia) Liepāja	2–0	1–1	3–1
2024–25	UEFA Conference League	2Q	(Belgium) Gent	0−3	1−4	1−7
2025–26	UEFA Champions League	1Q	(Gibraltar) Lincoln Red Imps	2−3	0−1	2−4
2025–26	UEFA Conference League	3Q	(Northern Ireland) Linfield	2–1	0−2	2−3
2026–27	UEFA Conference League	1Q	(Iceland) Stjarnan	2–2	1–3	3–5
2027–28	UEFA Conference League	2Q				
