= Skála ÍF =

Association football club in Faroe Islands

- Full name: Skála Ítróttarfelag
- Founded: 1965; 61 years ago
- Ground: Undir Mýruhjalla
- Capacity: 2,000
- Chairman: Jakob Lind-Jakobsen
- Manager: Pauli Poulsen
- League: Faroe Islands Premier League
- 2025: 1. deild, 1st of 10 (champions; promoted)
- Website: http://www.skalaif.fo
Home colours	Away colours

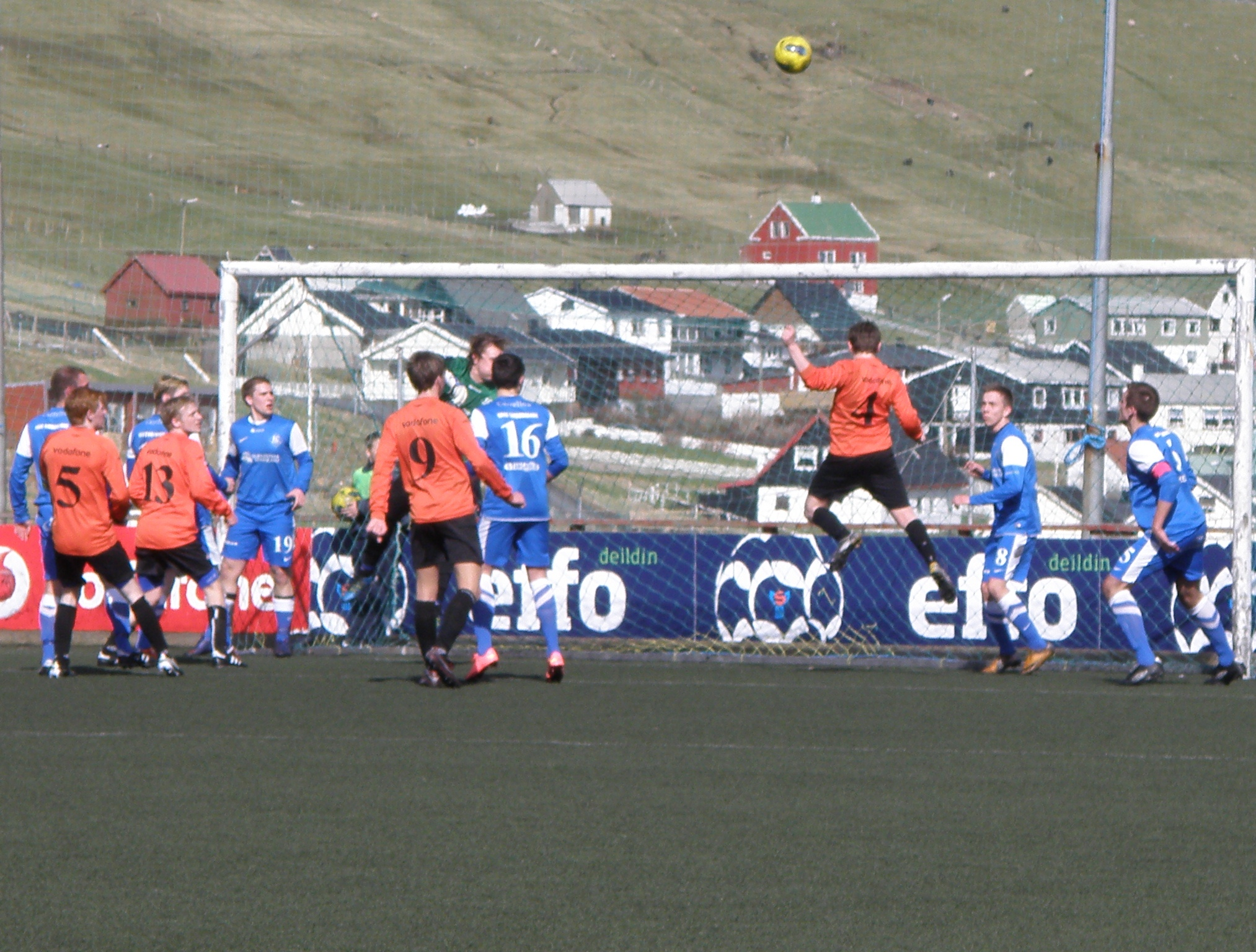
Skála vs. FC Suðuroy in the Faroe Islands Cup 2012

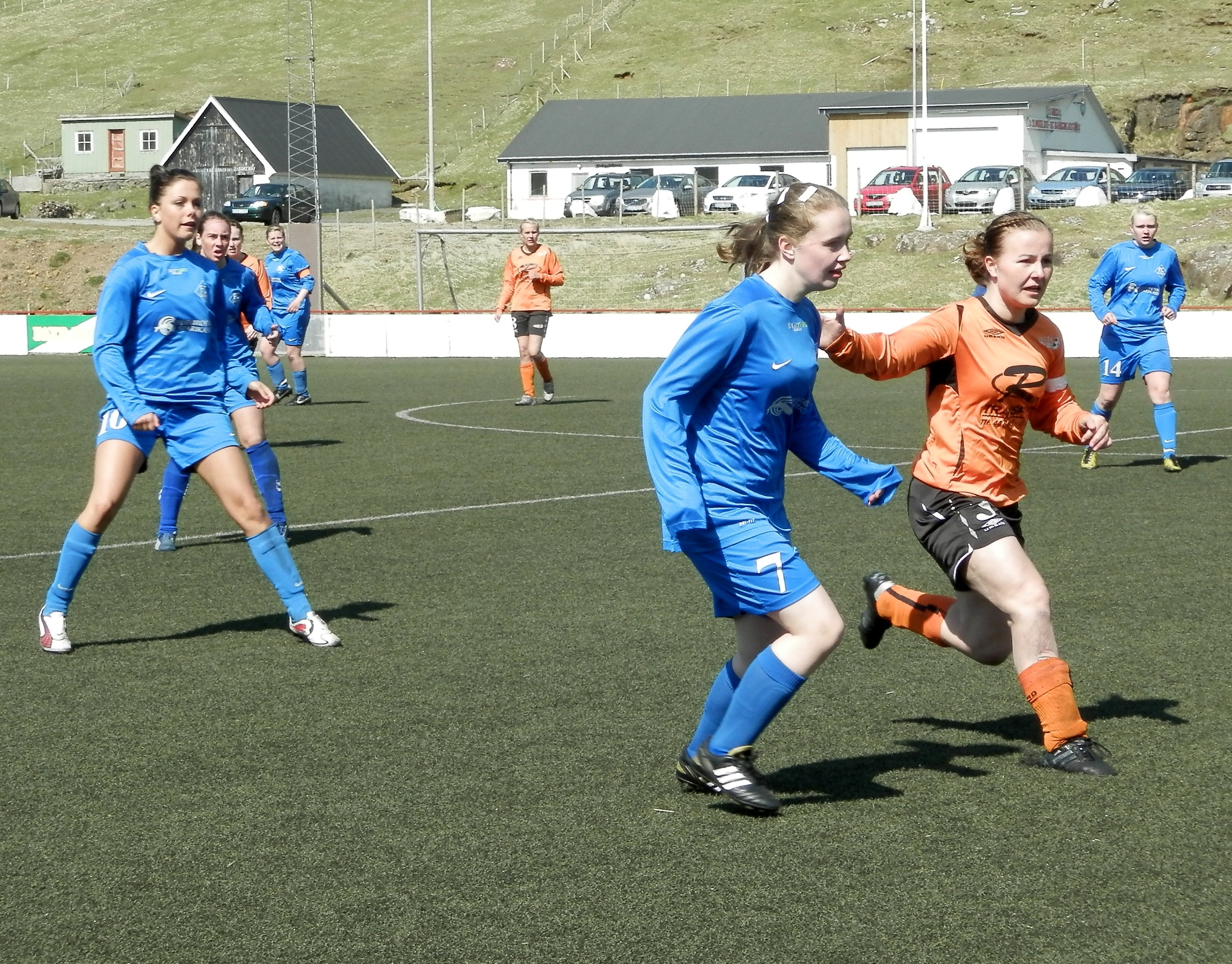
Skála also has a team in the women's top division. Here they are playing against FC Suðuroy.

Skála Ítróttarfelag (Skála ÍF), or more commonly referred to as just Skála, is a Faroese professional football club based in the village of Skála, municipality of Runavík. The club currently plays in Meistaradeildin, the top division of the Faroese football league. The club was founded on 15 May 1965.

They were promoted to the top division after winning the 2015 season of 1. deild with 70 points. They were also promoted to the top tier after the 2013 season, but were relegated after one season in the then-named Effodeildin.

The 2005 season was the best in the club's history, when Skála finished second and qualified for the 2006–07 UEFA Cup.

== History ==
The club was founded on 15 May 1965.

== Honours ==
- 1. deild: 4
  - 2015, 2021, 2023, 2025
- 2. deild: 3
  - 1998, 2000, 2010
- 3. deild: 1
  - 1985

== Current squad ==
As of 15 August 2026.

Note: Flags indicate national team as defined under FIFA eligibility rules; some limited exceptions apply. Players may hold more than one non-FIFA nationality.

No.	Pos.	Nation	Player
1	GK	FRO	Hans Jákup Arngrímsson
2	DF	FRO	Rói Dahl Olsen
3	DF	FRO	Markus J. Hellisdal
4	DF	FRO	Jákup Jakobsen (captain)
5	DF	SWE	Markus Ibrahim Reisi
7	DF	FRO	Kristian Martin Jakobsen
8	DF	FRO	Djóni Petersen
9	DF	FRO	Sølvi Johannessen
10	FW	FRO	Martin Johansen
12	DF	FRO	Karl Martin Johansen
14	FW	FRO	Silas Gaard
15	DF	FRO	Bjarti Thorleifsson
16	MF	FRO	John Joensen

No.	Pos.	Nation	Player
17	DF	FRO	Jákup Pauli Frederiksberg
18	DF	DEN	Malthe Nielsen
19	FW	FRO	Andreas Egeberg Jacobsen
20	FW	FRO	Markus Isaksen
21	MF	FRO	Beinir Sigurd Højgaard
23	FW	FRO	Dávid Johansen
25	FW	DEN	Sebastian Larsen
26	MF	FRO	Teitur Poulsen
27	DF	DEN	Sebastian Slettegaard
28	FW	NGR	Maxwell Effiom
29	MF	FRO	Morits Mortensen
91	GK	FRO	Suni Ernstsson

== Coaching Staff ==
As of 6 April 2026.

Role	Name
Manager	(Faroe Islands) Pauli Poulsen
Assistant Manager	(Faroe Islands) Ari Ellingsgaard
Goalkeeping coach	(Faroe Islands) Steffan Gaard

== UEFA club competition record ==
As of 17 March 2026.

Competition	Pld	W	D	L	GF	GA
UEFA Cup	2	0	0	2	0	4
UEFA Intertoto Cup	2	0	0	2	0	3
Total	4	0	0	4	0	7

Season	Competition	Round	Club	Home	Away	Aggregate
2005	UEFA Intertoto Cup	First round	(Finland) Tampere United	0–2	0–1	0–3
2006–07	UEFA Cup	First qualifying round	(Norway) Start	0–1	0–3	0–4

== Managers ==
- (Faroe Islands) John Petersen (2007–08)
- (Faroe Islands) Eliesar Olsen (2010-2014)
- (Faroe Islands) Pauli Poulsen (2014–17)
- (Faroe Islands) Eyðun Klakstein (2017–19)
- (Faroe Islands) Bill McLeod Jacobsen (2020-2020)
- (Faroe Islands) Sorin Anghel Vasile (2020-2021)
- (Denmark) Michael Bjørn Nielsen (2022)
- (Faroe Islands) Pauli Poulsen (2022-Present)

== Notable former players ==
- (Russia) Mark Ryutin
- (Sweden) Rasmus Andersson
- (Faroe Islands) Fróði Benjaminsen
