= Petur Knudsen =

Faroese footballer (born 1998)

Personal information
- Date of birth: 21 April 1998 (age 28)
- Place of birth: Saltangará, Faroe Islands
- Position: Forward

Team information
- Current team: NSÍ
- Number: 16

Youth career
- –2018: NSÍ

Senior career*
Years	Team	Apps	(Gls)
2014–2018	NSÍ II	39	(24)
2014–2021	NSÍ	137	(53)
2021–2023	Lyngby	32	(8)
2023	El Paso Locomotive	8	(0)
2024–	NSÍ	67	(39)

International career^{‡}
2012–2013	Faroe Islands U15		
2013–2014	Faroe Islands U17	19	(0)
2015–2016	Faroe Islands U19	6	(0)
2016–2020	Faroe Islands U21	15	(3)
2021–	Faroe Islands	35	(3)
- * Club domestic league appearances and goals as of 17:36, 1 November 2026 (UTC) ‡ National team caps and goals as of 16 November 2026

Petur Knudsen (born 21 April 1998) is a Faroese professional footballer who plays as a forward for NSÍ and the Faroe Islands national team.

== Club career ==
On 30 June 2021, Knudsen signed a two-year deal with newly relegated Danish 1st Division club Lyngby Boldklub. He won promotion to the Danish Superliga in his first season with the club, making 26 total appearances in which he scored eight goals. Knudsen left Lyngby at the end of the 2022–23 season, as his contract wasn't renewed. After some time without a club, Knudsen was announced as a new player for USL Championship club El Paso Locomotive on a one-year deal with the option of a one-year extension. This transfer made Petur Knudsen the first ever Faroese footballer to play professionally in the United States. On 1 November 2023, it was announced that Knudsen would not be returning for the 2024 season. He returned to his first club, NSÍ Runavík, in 2024.

== International career ==
Knudsen made his international debut for Faroe Islands on 28 March 2021 in a 2022 FIFA World Cup qualification match against Austria, which finished as a 3–1 away loss. He scored his first goal for the Faroes in a 4–1 loss to Estonia at the 2024 Baltic Cup.

== Personal life ==
Knudsen is the son of former Faroese international footballer Jens Martin Knudsen.

Petur Knudsen works daily with his father Jens Martin Knudsen and his brother Aron Knudsen at the fish factory Vaðhorn in Strendur.

== Career statistics ==
=== Club ===
As of match played 14 October 2022

Appearances and goals by club, season and competition
Club	Season	League			National cup (Note: Includes Faroe Islands Cup, Danish Cup)		Continental		Other		Total	
Club	Season	Division	Apps	Goals	Apps	Goals	Apps	Goals	Apps	Goals	Apps	Goals
NSÍ	2014	Faroe Islands Premier League	1	0	0	0	—		—		1	0
NSÍ	2015	Faroe Islands Premier League	6	0	0	0	—		—		6	0
NSÍ	2016	Faroe Islands Premier League	25	5	4	1	2 (Note: Appearances in UEFA Europa League)	0	—		31	6
NSÍ	2017	Faroe Islands Premier League	25	6	3	0	2	1	—		30	7
NSÍ	2018	Faroe Islands Premier League	26	9	0	0	2	1	1 (Note: Appearance(s) in Faroe Islands Super Cup)	0	29	10
NSÍ	2019	Faroe Islands Premier League	19	8	0	0	2	0	—		21	8
NSÍ	2020	Faroe Islands Premier League	21	16	3	1	2	1	—		26	18
NSÍ	2021	Faroe Islands Premier League	14	9	2	0	—		1	0	17	9
NSÍ	Total		137	53	12	2	10	3	2	0	161	58
Lyngby	2021–22	Danish 1st Division	24	6	2	2	—		—		26	8
Lyngby	2022–23	Danish Superliga	8	2	0	0	—		—		8	2
Lyngby	Total		24	6	2	2	—		—		26	8
El Paso Locomotive	2023	USL Championship	8	0	0	0	—		—		8	0
Career total			168	59	14	4	10	3	2	0	195	68

=== International ===
As of match played 16 November 2026

Appearances and goals by national team and year
National team	Year	Apps	Goals
Faroe Islands
Faroe Islands	2021	7	0
Faroe Islands	2022	2	0
Faroe Islands	2023	3	0
Faroe Islands	2024	8	0
Faroe Islands	2025	6	1
Faroe Islands	2026	9	1
Total		35	3

Scores and results list Faroe Islands' goal tally first, score column indicates score after each Knudsen goal.

List of international goals scored by Petur Knudsen
No.	Date	Venue	Opponent	Score	Result	Competition
1	8 June 2024	Lilleküla Stadium, Tallinn, Estonia	Estonia	1–0	1–4	2024 Baltic Cup
2	18 November 2025	Stadion Aldo Drosina, Pula, Croatia	Kazakhstan	1–0	1–0	Friendly
3	6 October 2026	Astana Arena, Astana, Kazakhstan	Kazakhstan	1–0	2–2	2026–27 UEFA Nations League C

== Honours ==
NSÍ

- Faroe Islands Premier League: 2026
- Faroe Islands Cup: 2017

Individual

- Faroese Footballer of the Year: 2020
- Faroese Young Footballer of the Year: 2020
- Faroe Islands Team of the Season: 2020, 2024, 2025
