= Stefan Radosavljevic =

Faroese footballer (born 2000)

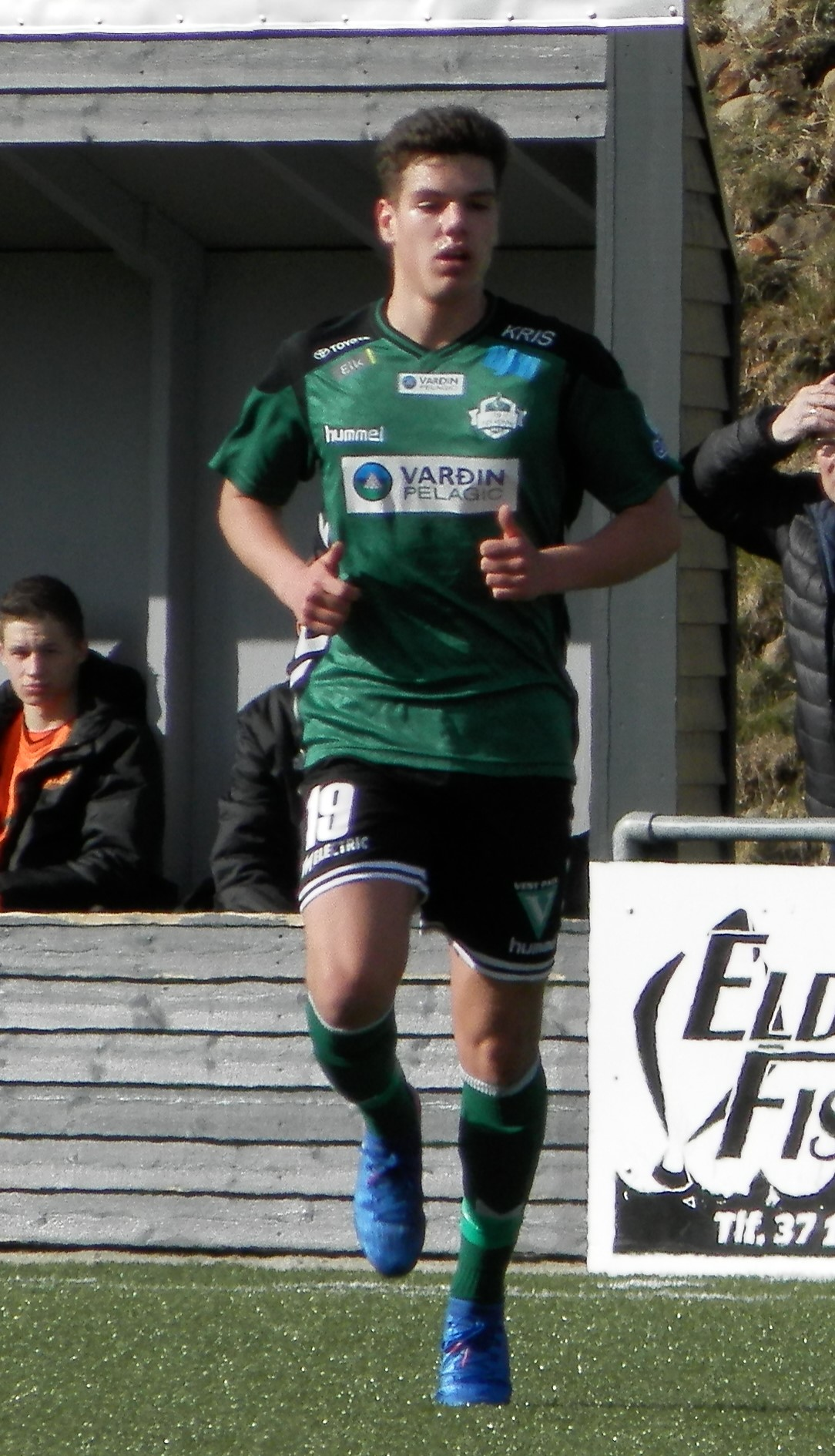
- Radosavljevic in 2017

Personal information
- Date of birth: 8 September 2000 (age 26)
- Place of birth: Belgrade, FR Yugoslavia
- Height: 1.81 m (5 ft 11 in)
- Position: Attacking midfielder

Team information
- Current team: HB
- Number: 18

Youth career
- 2016: TB

Senior career*
| Years | Team | Apps | (Gls) |
| 2017–2018 | TB/FCS/Royn | 47 | (8) |
| 2019 | TB | 13 | (6) |
| 2019–2020 | B36 | 36 | (8) |
| 2021–2022 | HB | 50 | (22) |
| 2023–2024 | Sligo Rovers | 46 | (5) |
| 2025 | Víkingur Gøta | 24 | (3) |
| 2026– | HB | 17 | (4) |

International career^{‡}
| 2016–2017 | Faroe Islands U17 | 9 | (0) |
| 2017–2018 | Faroe Islands U19 | 10 | (0) |
| 2019–2022 | Faroe Islands U21 | 18 | (5) |
| 2022– | Faroe Islands | 10 | (1) |
- * Club domestic league appearances and goals as of 1 November 2026 ‡ National team caps and goals as of 23:40, 2 March 2025 (UTC)

Stefan Radosavljevic (Serbian Cyrillic: Стефан Радосављевић; born 8 September 2000) is a professional footballer who plays as an attacking midfielder for HB. Born in Serbia, he plays for the Faroe Islands national team.

== Club career ==
Radosavljevic started his career at Faroese side TB in 2016, making his debut in the Faroe Islands Premier League the following season, when the club renamed to TB/FCS/Royn. In 2019, he moved to B36 for two seasons, before moving to Tórshavn city rivals HB. In March 2022, he was named the League's Player of the Month.

In 2023, he signed for Sligo Rovers in the League of Ireland Premier Division. He left the club at the end of the 2024 season. On March 10, 2025, he signed with Víkingur Gøta.

== International career ==
Born in Belgrade, Radosavljevic has represented the Faroe Islands since youth, playing with the U17s in 2016. He scored his first international youth goal in a 3–1 defeat to Kazakhstan U21 during qualifying for UEFA Euro 2021.

He received his first call up to the Faroese senior national team in 2022, making his debut in a 5–0 friendly loss to Czech Republic. He scored his first goal for the national team in his second match, in an 1–1 draw against Kosovo.

== Career statistics ==
=== Club ===
As of match played on 28 June 2024

Appearances and goals by club, season and competition
| Club | Season | League | | | National cup (Note: Includes Faroe Islands Cup & FAI Cup) | | Continental | | Other | | Total | |
| Club | Season | Division | Apps | Goals | Apps | Goals | Apps | Goals | Apps | Goals | Apps | Goals |
|---|---|---|---|---|---|---|---|---|---|---|---|---|
| TB/FCS/Royn | 2017 | Faroe Islands Premier League | 22 | 3 | 2 | 0 | – | | – | | 24 | 3 |
| TB/FCS/Royn | 2018 | Faroe Islands Premier League | 25 | 5 | 4 | 1 | – | | – | | 29 | 6 |
| TB/FCS/Royn | Total | | 47 | 8 | 6 | 1 | – | | – | | 53 | 9 |
| TB | 2019 | Faroe Islands Premier League | 13 | 6 | 2 | 1 | – | | – | | 15 | 7 |
| B36 | 2019 | Faroe Islands Premier League | 12 | 3 | – | | 2 (Note: Appearances in UEFA Europa League) | 0 | – | | 14 | 3 |
| B36 | 2020 | Faroe Islands Premier League | 24 | 5 | 3 | 3 | 4 | 1 | – | | 31 | 9 |
| B36 | Total | | 36 | 8 | 3 | 3 | 6 | 1 | – | | 45 | 12 |
| HB | 2021 | Faroe Islands Premier League | 24 | 9 | 3 | 2 | 5 (Note: One appearance in UEFA Champions League, Four appearances in UEFA Europa Conference League) | 0 | 1 (Note: Appearance in Faroe Islands Super Cup) | 0 | 33 | 11 |
| HB | 2022 | Faroe Islands Premier League | 26 | 13 | 4 | 1 | 2 (Note: Appearances in UEFA Europa Conference League) | 0 | – | | 32 | 14 |
| HB | Total | | 50 | 22 | 7 | 3 | 7 | 0 | 1 | 0 | 65 | 25 |
| Sligo Rovers | 2023 | League of Ireland Premier Division | 31 | 5 | 1 | 0 | – | | – | | 32 | 5 |
| Sligo Rovers | 2024 | League of Ireland Premier Division | 15 | 0 | 0 | 0 | – | | – | | 15 | 0 |
| Sligo Rovers | Total | | 46 | 5 | 1 | 0 | – | | – | | 37 | 5 |
| Career Total | | | 192 | 49 | 19 | 8 | 13 | 1 | 1 | 0 | 225 | 58 |

=== International ===
As of match played on 11 June 2024

Appearances and goals by national team and year
| National team | Year | Apps | Goals |
|---|---|---|---|
| Faroe Islands | 2022 | 2 | 1 |
| Faroe Islands | 2023 | 6 | 0 |
| Faroe Islands | 2024 | 2 | 0 |
| Total | | 10 | 1 |

Scores and results list Faroe Island's goal tally first, score column indicates score after each Radosavljevic goal.

List of international goals scored by Stefan Radosavljevic
| No. | Date | Venue | Opponent | Score | Result | Competition |
|---|---|---|---|---|---|---|
| 1 | 19 November 2022 | Fadil Vokrri Stadium, Pristina, Kosovo | Kosovo | 1–1 | 1–1 | Friendly |
