= Bárður á Reynatrøð =

Faroese footballer (born 2000)

Personal information
- Date of birth: 8 January 2000 (age 26)
- Place of birth: Faroe Islands
- Height: 1.91 m (6 ft 3 in)
- Position: Goalkeeper

Team information
- Current team: Víkingur
- Number: 1

Senior career*
Years	Team	Apps	(Gls)
2016–	Víkingur	155	(0)
2020	→ Skála (loan)	27	(0)

International career^{‡}
2023–	Faroe Islands	16	(0)
- * Club domestic league appearances and goals as of 1 November 2026 ‡ National team caps and goals as of 9 July 2026

Bárður á Reynatrøð (born 8 January 2000) is a Faroese professional footballer who plays as a goalkeeper for Víkingur Gøta and the Faroe Islands national team.

== Club career ==
á Reynatrøð was loaned out to Skála ÍF from Víkingur Gøta for the 2020 Faroe Islands Premier League season.

== International career ==
á Reynatrøð is a former Faroe Islands youth international. In 2017, he was the starting goalkeeper for the under-17 team that qualified for the 2017 UEFA European Under-17 Championship. In 2021 and 2022, he made a total of eight appearances in qualification for the 2023 UEFA European Under-21 Championship. He suffered a hand injury in a match against Armenia in the tournament that sidelined him for several weeks.

á Reynatrøð made his senior international debut on 27 March 2023 in a friendly with North Macedonia. The match ultimate ended in a 0–1 defeat with the goalkeeper earning praise for his performance. With the cap, he became the twelfth senior men's international goalkeeper for the Faroe Islands since the association gained recognition in 1988.

== Career statistics ==
=== Club ===
As of matches played on 25 September 2024.

Club	Season	League			Faroe Islands Cup		Faroe Islands Super Cup		Continental		Total	
Club	Season	Division	Apps	Goals	Apps	Goals	Apps	Goals	Apps	Goals	Apps	Goals
Víkingur	2016	Faroe Islands Premier League	0	0	0	0	0	0	0	0	0	0
Víkingur	2017	Faroe Islands Premier League	0	0	0	0	0	0	0	0	0	0
Víkingur	2018	Faroe Islands Premier League	3	0	0	0	0	0	0	0	3	0
Víkingur	2019	Faroe Islands Premier League	1	0	0	0	—		0	0	1	0
Víkingur	2021	Faroe Islands Premier League	21	0	4	0	—		—		25	0
Víkingur	2022	Faroe Islands Premier League	27	0	5	0	—		4 (Note: Appearance(s) in UEFA Europa Conference League)	0	36	0
Víkingur	2023	Faroe Islands Premier League	27	0	1	0	1	0	2	0	31	0
Víkingur	2024	Faroe Islands Premier League	23	0	3	0	—		4	0	30	0
Víkingur	Total		102	0	13	0	1	0	10	0	126	0
Skála (loan)	2020	Faroe Islands Premier League	27	0	1	0	—		—		28	0
Career total			129	0	14	0	1	0	10	0	154	0

=== International ===
As of match played 9 July 2026

Appearances and goals by national team and year
National team	Year	Apps	Goals
Faroe Islands	2023	3	0
Faroe Islands	2024	7	0
Faroe Islands	2025	4	0
Faroe Islands	2026	2	0
Total		16	0
