= Adrian Justinussen =

Faroese footballer (born 1998)

Personal information
- Full name: Adrian Rúnason Justinussen
- Date of birth: 21 July 1998 (age 28)
- Place of birth: Tórshavn, Faroe Islands
- Height: 1.80 m (5 ft 11 in)
- Position: Forward

Team information
- Current team: Horsens
- Number: 15

Youth career
- HB

Senior career*
| Years | Team | Apps | (Gls) |
| 2014–2019 | HB II | 36 | (23) |
| 2014–2023 | HB | 201 | (84) |
| 2024–2025 | Hillerød | 62 | (30) |
| 2026– | Horsens | 25 | (4) |

International career^{‡}
| 2014 | Faroe Islands U17 | 9 | (0) |
| 2015 | Faroe Islands U19 | 2 | (0) |
| 2018–2020 | Faroe Islands U21 | 5 | (0) |
| 2022– | Faroe Islands | 26 | (2) |
- * Club domestic league appearances and goals as of 8 November 2026 ‡ National team caps and goals as of 16 November 2026

Adrian Rúnason Justinussen (born 21 July 1998) is a Faroese professional footballer who plays as a forward for Danish Superliga club AC Horsens and the Faroe Islands national team.

== Club career ==
Justinussen is a youth academy graduate of Havnar Bóltfelag. On 24 May 2020, he completed a hat-trick by scoring three free kicks in nine minutes in a league match against Argja Bóltfelag. On 3 March 2021, he signed a contract extension with the club until the end of the 2023 season.

On 19 January 2024, Justinussen joined Danish 1st Division club Hillerød Fodbold on a two-year deal.

On 3 October 2025, fellow Danish 1st Division club AC Horsens announced the signing of Justinussen, effective from 1 January 2026. It was reported that Justinussen would receive a sign-on fee of 1 million Danish kroner, and after two years he would earn an additional 1 million.

== International career ==
Justinussen made his senior team debut for Faroe Islands on 29 March 2022 in a 1–0 friendly win over Liechtenstein. He scored his first goal for the Faroe Islands in a 4–0 friendly win against Liechtenstein on 22 March 2024.

== Personal life ==
Justinussen worked as an electrician while playing football in the Faroe Islands. After transferring to Hillerød, he became a full-time professional footballer.

== Career statistics ==
=== Club ===
As of match played 14 September 2024

| Club | Season | League | | | National cup | | Continental | | Other | | Total | |
| Club | Season | Division | Apps | Goals | Apps | Goals | Apps | Goals | Apps | Goals | Apps | Goals |
|---|---|---|---|---|---|---|---|---|---|---|---|---|
| HB II | 2014 | 1. deild | 5 | 3 | — | | — | | — | | 5 | 3 |
| HB II | 2015 | 2. deild | 8 | 1 | — | | — | | — | | 8 | 1 |
| HB II | 2016 | 1. deild | 14 | 13 | — | | — | | — | | 14 | 13 |
| HB II | 2017 | 1. deild | 8 | 5 | — | | — | | — | | 8 | 5 |
| HB II | 2018 | 1. deild | 0 | 0 | — | | — | | — | | 0 | 0 |
| HB II | 2019 | 1. deild | 1 | 1 | — | | — | | — | | 1 | 1 |
| HB II | Total | | 36 | 23 | 0 | 0 | 0 | 0 | 0 | 0 | 36 | 23 |
| HB | 2014 | FIPL | 1 | 0 | 0 | 0 | 0 | 0 | 0 | 0 | 1 | 0 |
| HB | 2015 | FIPL | 16 | 1 | 2 | 0 | 1 (Note: Appearance(s) in UEFA Europa League) | 0 | — | | 19 | 1 |
| HB | 2016 | FIPL | 17 | 1 | 2 | 2 | 2 | 0 | — | | 21 | 3 |
| HB | 2017 | FIPL | 23 | 1 | 2 | 0 | — | | — | | 25 | 1 |
| HB | 2018 | FIPL | 26 | 20 | 5 | 4 | — | | — | | 31 | 24 |
| HB | 2019 | FIPL | 26 | 16 | 5 | 1 | 3 (Note: One appearance in UEFA Champions League; two appearances, one goal in UEFA Europa League) | 1 | 0 | 0 | 34 | 18 |
| HB | 2020 | FIPL | 15 | 12 | 3 | 1 | 1 | 0 | 1 (Note: Appearance in Faroe Islands Super Cup) | 1 | 20 | 14 |
| HB | 2021 | FIPL | 26 | 10 | 3 | 0 | 5 (Note: One appearance in UEFA Champions League; four appearances in UEFA Europa Conference League) | 0 | 1 | 0 | 35 | 10 |
| HB | 2022 | FIPL | 26 | 6 | 4 | 1 | 2 (Note: Appearances in UEFA Europa Conference League) | 0 | — | | 32 | 7 |
| HB | 2023 | FIPL | 25 | 17 | 5 | 0 | 2 | 0 | — | | 32 | 17 |
| HB | Total | | 201 | 84 | 31 | 9 | 16 | 1 | 2 | 1 | 250 | 95 |
| Hillerød | 2023–24 | Danish 1st Division | 14 | 7 | — | | — | | — | | 14 | 7 |
| Hillerød | 2024–25 | Danish 1st Division | 9 | 7 | 0 | 0 | — | | — | | 9 | 7 |
| Hillerød | Total | | 23 | 14 | 0 | 0 | 0 | 0 | 0 | 0 | 23 | 14 |
| Career total | | | 260 | 121 | 31 | 9 | 16 | 1 | 2 | 1 | 309 | 132 |

=== International ===
As of match played 16 November 2026

Appearances and goals by national team and year
| National team | Year | Apps | Goals |
|---|---|---|---|
| Faroe Islands | 2022 | 1 | 0 |
| Faroe Islands | 2023 | 0 | 0 |
| Faroe Islands | 2024 | 10 | 1 |
| Faroe Islands | 2025 | 8 | 0 |
| Faroe Islands | 2026 | 7 | 1 |
| Total | | 26 | 2 |

Scores and results list Faroe Islands' goal tally first, score column indicates score after each Justinussen goal.

List of international goals scored by Adrian Justinussen
| No. | Date | Venue | Opponent | Score | Result | Competition |
|---|---|---|---|---|---|---|
| 1 | 22 March 2024 | Marbella Football Center, Marbella, Spain | Liechtenstein | 3–0 | 4–0 | Friendly |
| 2 | 2 October 2026 | Tórsvøllur, Tórshavn, Faroe Islands | Slovakia | 1–1 | 1–1 | 2026–27 UEFA Nations League C |

== Honours ==
HB II

- 2. deild: 2015

HB

- Faroe Islands Premier League: 2018, 2020
- Faroe Islands Cup: 2019, 2020, 2023
- Faroe Islands Super Cup: 2019, 2021

Individual

- Faroese Footballer of the Year: 2018
- Faroe Islands Premier League top goalscorer: 2018
- Danish 1st Division top goalscorer: 2025–26
