= Arnbjørn Svensson =

Faroese footballer (born 1999)

Personal information
- Date of birth: 1 July 1999 (age 27)
- Place of birth: Faroe Islands
- Height: 1.85 m (6 ft 1 in)
- Position: Attacking midfielder

Team information
- Current team: Víkingur
- Number: 18

Youth career
- Víkingur

Senior career*
Years	Team	Apps	(Gls)
2017–	Víkingur	190	(18)

International career^{‡}
2015	Faroe Islands U17	4	(0)
2019	Faroe Islands U19	5	(0)
2020	Faroe Islands U21	3	(0)
2024–	Faroe Islands	3	(1)
- * Club domestic league appearances and goals as of 1 November 2026 ‡ National team caps and goals as of 18 November 2025

Arnbjørn Svensson (born 1 July 1999) is a Faroese football player who plays as an attacking midfielder or right midfielder for Víkingur and the Faroe Islands national team.

== International career ==
Svensson made his debut for the senior Faroe Islands national team on 22 March 2024 in a friendly against Liechtenstein. He scored the last goal in a 4–0 victory.

== Career statistics ==
=== Club ===
As of matches played on 25 September 2024.

Club	Season	League			Faroe Islands Cup		Faroe Islands Super Cup		Continental		Total	
Club	Season	Division	Apps	Goals	Apps	Goals	Apps	Goals	Apps	Goals	Apps	Goals
Víkingur	2017	Faroe Islands Premier League	2	0	0	0	0	0	0	0	2	0
Víkingur	2018	Faroe Islands Premier League	1	0	0	0	0	0	0	0	1	0
Víkingur	2019	Faroe Islands Premier League	20	2	3	0	—		—		23	2
Víkingur	2020	Faroe Islands Premier League	20	0	4	0	—		—		24	0
Víkingur	2021	Faroe Islands Premier League	22	3	3	0	—		—		25	3
Víkingur	2022	Faroe Islands Premier League	26	4	4	1	—		4 (Note: Appearance(s) in UEFA Europa Conference League)	0	34	5
Víkingur	2023	Faroe Islands Premier League	27	2	1	1	1	0	2	0	31	3
Víkingur	2024	Faroe Islands Premier League	22	3	4	1	—		4	0	30	4
Career total			140	14	19	3	1	0	10	0	170	17

=== International ===
As of match played 22 March 2024
Scores and results list Faroe Island's goal tally first, score column indicates score after each Svensson goal.

List of international goals scored by Arnbjørn Svensson
No.	Date	Venue	Opponent	Score	Result	Competition	Ref.
1	22 March 2024	San Pedro Alcántara, Spain	Liechtenstein	4–0	4–0	Friendly	
