= 2019 Faroe Islands Premier League =

Faroe Islands Premier League
- Season: 2019
- Champions: KÍ (18th title)
- Champions League: KÍ
- Europa League: B36; NSÍ; HB (via Faroe Islands Cup)
- Matches played: 135
- Goals scored: 435 (3.22 per match)
- Top goalscorer: Klæmint Olsen (26 goals)
- Biggest home win: KÍ 7–0 TB (Round 7)
- Biggest away win: EB/Streymur 1–8 NSÍ (Round 10)
- Highest scoring: HB 6–4 EB/Streymur (Round 12); ÍF 4–6 AB (Round 25)
- All statistics correct as of 26 October 2019.

The 2019 Faroe Islands Premier League (referred to as Betri deildin menn for sponsorship reasons) was the 77th season of top-tier football in the Faroe Islands and the 15th under the current format.

HB Tórshavn were the defending champions, having won their 23rd title in the previous season. The season started on 10 March and ended on 26 October.

== Teams ==
Locations of the 2019 Betri deidin menn teams

The champions of the 2018 1. deild, Ítróttarfelag Fuglafjarðar, replaced 07 Vestur, the last-placed team in the 2018 Faroe Islands Premier League.

It is the second consecutive season in which only one team went promoted from 1. deild, as they were the only non-reserve team in the top three.

Tvøroyrar Bóltfelag, FC Suðuroy and Royn ended their cooperation and TB replaced TB/FC Suðuroy/Royn.

Team	City	Stadium	Capacity
Argja Bóltfelag	Argir	Skansi Arena	2,000
B36 Tórshavn	Tórshavn	Gundadalur	5,000
EB/Streymur	Streymnes	Við Margáir	2,000
Havnar Bóltfelag	Tórshavn	Gundadalur	5,000
Ítróttarfelag Fuglafjarðar	Fuglafjørður	Í Fløtugerði	3,000
Klaksvíkar Ítróttarfelag	Klaksvík	Við Djúpumýrar	4,000
NSÍ Runavík	Runavík	Við Løkin	2,000
Skála ÍF	Skála	Undir Mýruhjalla	1,500
Tvøroyrar Bóltfelag	Tvøroyri	Við Stórá	4,000
Víkingur Gøta	Norðragøta	Sarpugerði	3,000

== League table ==
Pos	Team	Pld	W	D	L	GF	GA	GD	Pts	Qualification or relegation (Note: There was no relegation this season as three reserve teams finished in the top three in 1. deild.)
1	KÍ (C)	27	21	3	3	62	19	+43	66	Qualification for the Champions League first qualifying round
2	B36	27	20	3	4	53	23	+30	63	Qualification for the Europa League preliminary round (Note: HB qualified for the Europa League preliminary round as winners of the 2019 Faroe Islands Cup.)
3	NSÍ	27	18	3	6	65	31	+34	57	Qualification for the Europa League preliminary round
4	HB	27	15	6	6	62	28	+34	51	Qualification for the Europa League preliminary round
5	Víkingur	27	16	3	8	51	35	+16	51	
6	Skála	27	12	1	14	38	32	+6	37	
7	AB	27	6	3	18	32	66	−34	21	
8	TB	27	5	4	18	20	57	−37	19	
9	EB/Streymur	27	5	3	19	25	63	−38	18	
10	ÍF	27	1	3	23	27	81	−54	6	

Source: Faroe Soccer (in Faroese)
Rules for classification: 1) Points; 2) Goal difference; 3) Goals scored.
(C) Champions

=== Positions by round ===
Team ╲ Round	1	2	3	4	5	6	7	8	9	10	11	12	13	14	15	16	17	18	19	20	21	22	23	24	25	26	27
KÍ	5	7	4	3	3	1	1	1	1	1	1	1	1	2	4	3	2	1	3	3	3	2	2	1	1	1	1
B36	3	1	1	1	2	3	5	5	3	3	3	3	3	4	3	1	3	2	1	1	1	1	1	2	2	2	2
NSÍ	3	3	7	4	6	5	4	2	2	2	2	2	2	1	1	2	1	3	2	2	2	3	3	3	3	3	3
HB	5	8	3	6	7	6	6	6	6	5	5	5	5	5	5	5	5	4	4	4	4	4	5	5	5	4	4
Víkingur	1	2	5	7	5	4	3	3	4	4	4	4	4	3	2	4	4	5	5	5	5	5	4	4	4	5	5
Skála	8	4	2	2	1	2	2	4	5	6	6	6	6	6	6	6	6	6	6	6	6	6	6	6	6	6	6
AB	7	5	8	8	9	9	10	10	10	9	10	10	9	10	10	10	9	8	8	8	8	8	9	9	9	7	7
TB	2	6	6	5	4	7	7	7	7	7	7	7	7	7	7	7	7	7	7	7	7	7	7	7	7	8	8
EB/Streymur	8	9	10	10	8	8	8	8	8	8	8	8	8	8	8	8	8	9	9	9	9	9	8	8	8	9	9
ÍF	10	10	9	9	10	10	9	9	9	10	9	9	10	9	9	9	10	10	10	10	10	10	10	10	10	10	10

Leader and Champions League first qualifying round
Europa League preliminary round

== Results ==
Each team plays three times (either twice at home and once away or once at home and twice away) against every other team for a total of 27 matches each.

=== Rounds 1–18 ===
Home \ Away	AB	B36	EBS	HB	ÍF	KÍ	NSÍ	SKÁ	TB	VÍK
AB		1–2	1–1	1–2	2–1	0–4	1–5	0–1	2–2	1–3
B36	4–1		3–0	2–1	3–0	0–3	1–1	1–0	1–0	2–1
EB/Streymur	5–1	1–2		0–3	0–2	0–1	1–8	0–1	0–2	1–4
HB	4–3	0–0	6–4		6–0	4–1	1–1	0–2	3–0	3–1
ÍF	4–6	1–3	2–3	0–2		2–3	2–4	0–3	2–2	0–4
KÍ	2–1	0–2	2–1	0–0	3–0		2–0	2–2	7–0	2–0
NSÍ	5–1	2–1	1–0	1–1	3–1	0–1		3–0	3–1	4–2
Skála	0–1	1–2	1–2	0–3	2–1	0–1	2–0		2–0	2–3
TB	2–1	0–1	1–0	1–1	1–0	1–0	0–3	0–2		1–2
Víkingur	1–1	1–0	1–1	1–0	3–0	2–2	2–3	2–1	3–1	

Source: Faroe Soccer (in Faroese)
Legend: Blue = home team win; Yellow = draw; Red = away team win.

=== Rounds 19–27 ===
Home \ Away	AB	B36	EBS	HB	ÍF	KÍ	NSÍ	SKÁ	TB	VÍK
AB		1–2			3–1	0–2		0–2		0–3
B36				2–2	7–2	0–3		1–0	3–1	
EB/Streymur	1–2	0–4		1–0	0–0					
HB	5–0						0–2	3–0	3–0	3–1
ÍF				1–5		0–3		1–3	1–1	
KÍ			4–0	3–1			3–2		3–0	
NSÍ	2–0	0–3	3–0		3–1					0–2
Skála			5–0			0–2	1–2		5–1	0–1
TB	0–1		1–2				1–4			0–2
Víkingur		0–1	2–1		3–2	1–3				

Source: Faroe Soccer (in Faroese)
Legend: Blue = home team win; Yellow = draw; Red = away team win.

== Top goalscorers ==
As of 26 October.

Player	Club	Goals
(Faroe Islands) Klæmint Olsen	NSÍ	26
(Faroe Islands) Jóannes Bjartalíð	KÍ	18
(Faroe Islands) Adrian Justinussen	HB	16
(Faroe Islands) Patrik Johannesen	KÍ	13
(Faroe Islands) Ari Olsen	HB	12
(Faroe Islands) Stefan Radosavljevic	TB/B36 (Note: Radosavljevic played for TB until matchday 15 and scored 6 goals.)	9
(Faroe Islands) Sølvi Vatnhamar	Víkingur	9
(Faroe Islands) Árni Frederiksberg	B36	8
(Faroe Islands) Petur Knudsen	NSÍ	8
(Denmark) Ronni Møller-Iversen	Skála	8

== See also ==
- 2019 Faroe Islands Cup
