= 2017 Faroe Islands Cup =

Løgmanssteypið

Tournament details
- Country: Faroe Islands
- Teams: 16

Final positions
- Champions: NSÍ Runavík (3rd title)
- Runners-up: B36 Tórshavn

Tournament statistics
- Matches played: 17
- Goals scored: 73 (4.29 per match)
- Top goal scorer: (Denmark) Daniel Pedersen (7 goals)

The 2017 Faroe Islands Cup was the 63rd edition of Faroe Islands domestic football cup. The competition started on 1 April and ended on 26 August. KÍ were the defending champions, having won their sixth cup title the previous year, but were eliminated in the semifinals by the eventual champions NSÍ, which qualified for the first qualifying round of the 2018–19 UEFA Europa League.

Only the first teams of Faroese football clubs were allowed to participate. Teams from all divisions entered the competition in the first round.

== Participating clubs ==
2017 Effodeildin 10 teams	2017 1. deild 3 teams	2017 2. deild 1 team	2017 3. deild 2 teams
07 Vestur; B36; EB/Streymur; HB; ÍF; KÍ ^{TH}; NSÍ; Skála; TB/FC Suðuroy/Royn; Víkingur	AB; B68; Giza Hoyvík	B71	MB; Undrið

^{TH} – Title Holders

== Round and draw dates ==
Round	Draw date	Game date
First round	6 March	1–2 April
Quarterfinals	3 April	13 April
Semifinals	20 April	10 & 25 May
Final	—	26 August 2017 at Tórsvøllur, Tórshavn

== First round ==
Entering this round are all ten clubs from Effodeildin, three from 1. deild, one from 2. deild and two from 3. deild.

Team 1	Score	Team 2
B36 (1)	6–0	B71 (3)
Undrið (4)	0–4	KÍ (1)
EB/Streymur (1)	1–1 (a.e.t.) (7–6 p)	Skála (1)
07 Vestur (2)	0–4	NSÍ (1)
ÍF (1)	4–1	Giza/Hoyvík (2)
B68 (2)	1–6	Víkingur (1)
HB (1)	18–0	MB (4)
AB (1)	0–1	TB/FC Suðuroy/Royn (1)

== Quarter-finals ==
Team 1	Score	Team 2
ÍF (1)	0–2	KÍ (1)
HB (1)	2–1	EB/Streymur (1)
B36 (1)	1–0	Víkingur (1)
NSÍ (1)	3–2 (a.e.t.)	TB/FC Suðuroy/Royn (1)

== Semi-finals ==
Team 1	Agg.	Team 2	1st leg	2nd leg
KÍ (1)	2–5	NSÍ (1)	2–2	0–3
B36 (1)	4–3	HB (1)	1–1	3–2 (a.e.t.)

== Final ==
26 August 2017
19:45 WEST

B36 Tórshavn	0–1	NSÍ Runavík
	Report	Tróndargjógv 36'

Tórsvøllur, Tórshavn
Attendance: 3,578
Referee: Petur Reinert

== Top goalscorers ==
Rank	Player	Team	Goals
1	(Denmark) Daniel Pedersen	HB	7
2	(Faroe Islands) Klæmint Olsen	NSÍ	5
2	(Faroe Islands) Róaldur Jakobsen	B36	5
4	(Faroe Islands) Páll Klettskarð	KÍ	4
4	(Faroe Islands) Símun Samuelsen	HB	4
6	(Faroe Islands) Patrik Johannesen	B36	3
