= 2019 Faroe Islands Cup =

Løgmanssteypið

Tournament details
- Country: Faroe Islands
- Teams: 17

Final positions
- Champions: HB (27th title)
- Runners-up: Víkingur

Tournament statistics
- Matches played: 18
- Goals scored: 77 (4.28 per match)
- Top goal scorer: 4 players (4 goals)

The 2019 Faroe Islands Cup was the 65th edition of Faroe Islands domestic football cup. It started on 30 March and ended with the final on 21 September. B36 Tórshavn were the defending champions, having won their sixth cup title the previous year, but lost to KÍ in the quarterfinals. As the winner of the competition, HB qualified to the preliminary round of the 2020–21 UEFA Europa League.

Only the first teams of the participating clubs were allowed to enter the competition.

== Participating clubs ==
Premier League 10 teams	1. deild; 3 teams	2. deild; 3 teams	3. deild; 1 team
AB; B36^{TH}; EB/Streymur; HB; ÍF; KÍ; NSÍ; Skála; TB; Víkingur	07 Vestur; B68; B71	FC Hoyvík; FC Suðuroy; Undrið	Royn

^{TH} – Title Holders

== Round and draw dates ==
Round	Draw date	Game date
Preliminary round	18 March	30 March
First round	18 March	10 April
Quarterfinals	11 April	22 April
Semifinals	23 April	8–9 & 22–23 May
Final	—	21 September at Tórsvøllur, Tórshavn

== Preliminary round ==
Team 1	Score	Team 2
Royn (4)	2–1	FC Hoyvík (3)

== First round ==
Team 1	Score	Team 2
Royn(4)	0–4	B68
Undrið	1–13	KÍ
EB/Streymur	2–6	Víkingur
B36	4–0	07 Vestur
B71	1–0	ÍF
HB	1–0	NSÍ
TB	2–1	FC Suðuroy
Skála	1–0	AB

== Quarter-finals ==
Team 1	Score	Team 2
HB	4–0	B71
Víkingur	10–0	B68
B36	3–4 (a.e.t.)	KÍ
Skála	5–1	TB

== Semi-finals ==
Team 1	Agg.	Team 2	1st leg	2nd leg
HB	2–1	KÍ	1–1	1–0
Skála	1–1 (a)	Víkingur	1–1	0–0

== Final ==
21 September 2019
19:45 WEST

Víkingur Gøta	1–3	Havnar Bóltfelag
Olsen 62'	Report	Justinussen 40'; Samuelsen 52'; Pingel 71'

Tórsvøllur, Tórshavn
Attendance: 2,962
Referee: Dagfinn Forná

== Top goalscorers ==
Player	Club	Goals
(Nigeria) Adeshina Lawal	Víkingur	4
(Faroe Islands) Jonn Johannesen	KÍ	4
(Faroe Islands) Patrik Johannesen	KÍ	4
(Faroe Islands) Símun Samuelsen	HB	4
(Faroe Islands) Heðin Hansen	Víkingur	3
(Faroe Islands) Jákup Johansen	Skála	3
