= 2018 Faroe Islands Premier League =

Faroe Islands Premier League
- Season: 2018
- Dates: 11 March – 27 October
- Champions: Havnar Bóltfelag
- Champions League: Havnar Bóltfelag
- Europa League: B36 Tórshavn; NSÍ Runavík; KÍ Klaksvík
- Matches: 135
- Goals: 400 (2.96 per match)
- Top goalscorer: Adrian Justinussen (20 goals)
- Biggest home win: NSÍ 6–0 AB (R13); NSÍ 7–1 07 Vestur (R24)
- Biggest away win: 07 Vestur 0–5 NSÍ (R11)
- Highest scoring: NSÍ 7–1 07 Vestur (R24)
- All statistics correct as of 27 October 2018.

The 2018 Faroe Islands Premier League (also known as Betri deildin menn for sponsorship reasons) was the 76th season of top-tier football in the Faroe Islands. Víkingur Gøta were the defending champions, having won their second Faroese title in the previous season. The season started in 11 March and ended on 27 October.

== Teams ==
Locations of the 2018 Faroe Islands Premier League teams

The champions of the 2017 1. deild, AB Argir will be replacing ÍF who ended up last in the 2017 Faroe Islands Premier League.

| Team | City | Stadium | Capacity |
|---|---|---|---|
| Argja Bóltfelag | Argir | Skansi Arena | 2,000 |
| 07 Vestur | Sørvágur | á Dungasandi | 500 |
| B36 Tórshavn | Tórshavn | Gundadalur | 5,000 |
| EB/Streymur | Streymnes | Við Margáir | 2,000 |
| HB | Tórshavn | Gundadalur | 5,000 |
| KÍ | Klaksvík | Við Djúpumýrar | 4,000 |
| NSÍ Runavík | Runavík | Við Løkin | 2,000 |
| Skála | Skála | Undir Mýruhjalla | 1,500 |
| TB/FC Suðuroy/Royn | Trongisvágur | Við Stórá | 4,000 |
| Víkingur Gøta | Norðragøta | Sarpugerði | 3,000 |

Source: Scoresway

== League table ==
| Pos | Team | Pld | W | D | L | GF | GA | GD | Pts | Qualification or relegation |
|---|---|---|---|---|---|---|---|---|---|---|
| 1 | Havnar Bóltfelag (C) | 27 | 24 | 1 | 2 | 58 | 18 | +40 | 73 | Qualification for the Champions League first qualifying round |
| 2 | NSÍ Runavík | 27 | 17 | 4 | 6 | 64 | 25 | +39 | 55 | Qualification for the Europa League preliminary round |
| 3 | B36 Tórshavn | 27 | 16 | 5 | 6 | 58 | 33 | +25 | 53 | Qualification for the Europa League first qualifying round (Note: B36 Tórshavn qualified for the Europa League first qualifying round by winning the 2018 Faroe Islands Cup.) |
| 4 | KÍ Klaksvík | 27 | 16 | 3 | 8 | 48 | 25 | +23 | 51 | Qualification for the Europa League preliminary round |
| 5 | Víkingur Gøta | 27 | 11 | 6 | 10 | 39 | 37 | +2 | 39 | |
| 6 | Skála ÍF | 27 | 8 | 5 | 14 | 31 | 42 | −11 | 29 | |
| 7 | TB/FC Suðuroy/Royn | 27 | 8 | 4 | 15 | 27 | 42 | −15 | 28 | |
| 8 | EB/Streymur | 27 | 4 | 9 | 14 | 30 | 53 | −23 | 21 | |
| 9 | Argja Bóltfelag | 27 | 5 | 3 | 19 | 16 | 55 | −39 | 18 | |
| 10 | 07 Vestur (R) | 27 | 5 | 2 | 20 | 30 | 71 | −41 | 17 | Relegation to 1. deild (Note: Argja Bóltfelag avoided relegation because B68 finished fourth in 1. deild.) |

Updated to match(es) played on 27 October 2018. Source: Faroe Soccer (in Faroese), Soccerway
Rules for classification: 1) Points; 2) Goal difference; 3) Goals scored.
(C) Champions; (R) Relegated

=== Positions by round ===
| Team ╲ Round | 1 | 2 | 3 | 4 | 5 | 6 | 7 | 8 | 9 | 10 | 11 | 12 | 13 | 14 | 15 | 16 | 17 | 18 | 19 | 20 | 21 | 22 | 23 | 24 | 25 | 26 | 27 |
|---|---|---|---|---|---|---|---|---|---|---|---|---|---|---|---|---|---|---|---|---|---|---|---|---|---|---|---|
| HB | 9 | 6 | 5 | 4 | 3 | 2 | 2 | 2 | 1 | 1 | 1 | 1 | 1 | 1 | 1 | 1 | 1 | 1 | 1 | 1 | 1 | 1 | 1 | 1 | 1 | 1 | 1 |
| NSÍ | 1 | 3 | 3 | 2 | 2 | 3 | 3 | 3 | 5 | 4 | 4 | 4 | 3 | 3 | 4 | 3 | 3 | 3 | 3 | 3 | 3 | 4 | 4 | 4 | 3 | 2 | 2 |
| B36 | 7 | 4 | 4 | 7 | 6 | 4 | 4 | 4 | 2 | 2 | 2 | 3 | 4 | 4 | 3 | 5 | 4 | 5 | 5 | 4 | 4 | 3 | 2 | 3 | 2 | 4 | 3 |
| KÍ | 2 | 1 | 1 | 1 | 1 | 1 | 1 | 1 | 3 | 3 | 3 | 2 | 2 | 2 | 2 | 2 | 2 | 2 | 2 | 2 | 2 | 2 | 3 | 2 | 4 | 3 | 4 |
| Víkingur | 4 | 5 | 6 | 6 | 4 | 5 | 5 | 5 | 4 | 5 | 5 | 5 | 5 | 5 | 5 | 4 | 5 | 4 | 4 | 5 | 5 | 5 | 5 | 5 | 5 | 5 | 5 |
| Skála | 8 | 10 | 7 | 5 | 7 | 7 | 7 | 7 | 6 | 6 | 6 | 6 | 7 | 7 | 6 | 6 | 6 | 7 | 7 | 7 | 6 | 6 | 6 | 6 | 6 | 6 | 6 |
| TB/FCS/Royn | 10 | 7 | 8 | 8 | 8 | 9 | 9 | 9 | 8 | 8 | 8 | 8 | 8 | 8 | 8 | 8 | 8 | 8 | 8 | 8 | 7 | 7 | 7 | 7 | 7 | 7 | 7 |
| EB/Streymur | 3 | 2 | 2 | 3 | 5 | 6 | 6 | 6 | 7 | 7 | 7 | 7 | 6 | 6 | 7 | 7 | 7 | 6 | 6 | 6 | 8 | 8 | 8 | 8 | 8 | 8 | 8 |
| AB | 5 | 8 | 9 | 9 | 9 | 8 | 8 | 8 | 9 | 9 | 9 | 9 | 9 | 9 | 9 | 9 | 9 | 9 | 10 | 10 | 10 | 9 | 10 | 10 | 10 | 10 | 9 |
| 07 Vestur | 5 | 9 | 10 | 10 | 10 | 10 | 10 | 10 | 10 | 10 | 10 | 10 | 10 | 10 | 10 | 10 | 10 | 10 | 9 | 9 | 9 | 10 | 9 | 9 | 9 | 9 | 10 |

== Results ==
Each team plays three times (either twice at home and once away or once at home and twice away) against every other team for a total of 27 matches each.

=== Regular home games ===
| Home \ Away | 07V | ARG | B36 | EBS | HB | KÍ | NSÍ | SKÁ | TBF | VÍK |
|---|---|---|---|---|---|---|---|---|---|---|
| 07 Vestur | — | 1–0 | 0–3 | 0–3 | 1–4 | 2–3 | 0–5 | 4–1 | 1–2 | 0–1 |
| Argja Bóltfelag | 1–1 | — | 1–4 | 2–0 | 0–1 | 0–2 | 0–2 | 0–2 | 0–4 | 1–2 |
| B36 Tórshavn | 2–0 | 2–1 | — | 2–2 | 1–1 | 3–2 | 2–3 | 5–1 | 1–0 | 2–1 |
| EB/Streymur | 2–1 | 0–0 | 3–2 | — | 0–1 | 0–1 | 2–2 | 0–0 | 2–2 | 1–1 |
| HB | 3–0 | 5–0 | 2–1 | 1–0 | — | 0–3 | 0–2 | 2–1 | 4–0 | 2–1 |
| KÍ | 3–0 | 3–1 | 3–1 | 2–0 | 0–1 | — | 1–1 | 3–1 | 3–1 | 1–2 |
| NSÍ Runavík | 3–1 | 6–0 | 0–2 | 5–0 | 1–2 | 0–1 | — | 1–0 | 1–0 | 1–2 |
| Skála | 2–1 | 2–0 | 0–2 | 0–2 | 0–3 | 0–0 | 1–1 | — | 3–0 | 0–2 |
| TB/FC Suðuroy/Royn | 1–0 | 0–1 | 1–1 | 3–2 | 0–1 | 0–1 | 0–4 | 2–1 | — | 1–4 |
| Víkingur Gøta | 4–1 | 3–0 | 2–1 | 3–1 | 1–2 | 0–3 | 1–2 | 1–0 | 0–0 | — |

Updated to match(es) played on 27 October 2018. Source: Faroe Soccer (in Faroese)
Legend: Blue = home team win; Yellow = draw; Red = away team win.

=== Additional home games ===
| Home \ Away | 07V | ARG | B36 | EBS | HB | KÍ | NSÍ | SKÁ | TBF | VÍK |
|---|---|---|---|---|---|---|---|---|---|---|
| 07 Vestur | — | — | 1–3 | 3–3 | — | 4–2 | — | — | 0–3 | — |
| Argja Bóltfelag | 1–2 | — | 1–1 | — | — | — | 0–2 | 2–4 | — | 1–0 |
| B36 Tórshavn | — | — | — | 5–1 | 1–3 | 2–1 | — | — | 1–0 | — |
| EB/Streymur | — | 0–2 | — | — | 0–3 | — | 2–4 | 1–1 | — | 2–2 |
| HB | 3–1 | 3–0 | — | — | — | — | 2–1 | — | — | 2–1 |
| KÍ | — | 3–0 | — | 3–0 | 1–2 | — | — | — | — | 1–1 |
| NSÍ Runavík | 7–1 | — | 1–2 | — | — | 2–1 | — | 2–0 | — | — |
| Skála | 5–0 | — | 1–4 | — | 0–1 | 1–0 | — | — | 2–0 | — |
| TB/FC Suðuroy/Royn | — | 0–1 | — | 2–1 | 1–4 | 0–1 | 2–2 | — | — | — |
| Víkingur Gøta | 1–4 | — | 1–1 | — | — | — | 0–3 | 2–2 | 0–2 | — |

Updated to match(es) played on 27 October 2018. Source: Faroe Soccer (in Faroese)
Legend: Blue = home team win; Yellow = draw; Red = away team win.

== Top goalscorers ==
As of 27 October 2018

| Player | Club | Goals |
|---|---|---|
| (Faroe Islands) Adrian Justinussen | HB | 20 |
| (Faroe Islands) Klæmint Olsen | NSÍ | 13 |
| (Faroe Islands) Meinhard Olsen | B36 | 13 |
| (Estonia) Kaimar Saag | B36 | 11 |
| (Faroe Islands) Árni Frederiksberg | NSÍ | 11 |
| (Denmark) Sonny Jakobsen | 07 Vestur | 11 |
| (Faroe Islands) Brian Jacobsen | Skála | 10 |
