= 2016 Faroe Islands Premier League =

Faroe Islands Premier League
- Season: 2016
- Champions: Víkingur Gøta; 1st title
- Relegated: AB; B68 Toftir
- Champions League: Víkingur Gøta
- Europa League: KÍ; NSÍ; B36
- Matches: 135
- Goals: 422 (3.13 per match)
- Top goalscorer: Klæmint Olsen (23 goals)
- Biggest home win: NSÍ Runavík 7–1 ÍF; KÍ 6–0 B68 Toftir
- Biggest away win: B68 Toftir 0–5 NSÍ Runavík
- Highest scoring: NSÍ Runavík 7–1 ÍF

2016 Faroe Islands Premier League was the 74th season of top-tier football on the Faroe Islands. For sponsorship reasons, it was known as Effodeildin. B36 Tórshavn were the defending champions, having won their eleventh Faroese title in 2015.

The season was scheduled to begin on 5 March 2016 and conclude on 22 October 2016.

== Teams ==
Location of teams in Effodeildin 2016

Suðuroy and EB/Streymur had finished 9th and 10th respectively at the end of the previous season and were relegated to the 1. deild as a result.

Replacing them were the 1. deild champions Skála and runners-up B68 Toftir.

=== Team summaries ===
Team	City	Stadium
AB	Argir	Skansi Arena
B36 Tórshavn	Tórshavn	Gundadalur
B68 Toftir	Toftir	Svangaskarð
HB	Tórshavn	Gundadalur
ÍF	Fuglafjørður	Í Fløtugerði
KÍ	Klaksvík	Við Djúpumýrar
NSÍ Runavík	Runavík	Við Løkin
Skála	Skála	Undir Mýruhjalla
TB	Tvøroyri	Við Stórá
Víkingur Gøta	Norðragøta	Sarpugerði

== League table ==
Pos	Team	Pld	W	D	L	GF	GA	GD	Pts	Qualification or relegation
1	Víkingur Gøta (C)	27	19	4	4	59	25	+34	61	Qualification for the Champions League first qualifying round
2	KÍ	27	19	3	5	64	26	+38	60	Qualification for the Europa League first qualifying round (Note: KÍ qualified for the Europa League first qualifying round by winning the 2016 Faroe Islands Cup.)
3	NSÍ Runavík	27	18	1	8	60	36	+24	55	Qualification for the Europa League first qualifying round
4	B36 Tórshavn	27	14	7	6	46	28	+18	49	Qualification for the Europa League first qualifying round
5	HB	27	12	7	8	44	30	+14	43	
6	ÍF	27	9	5	13	42	59	−17	32	
7	TB	27	7	6	14	31	48	−17	27	
8	Skála	27	6	8	13	25	41	−16	26	
9	AB (R)	27	4	6	17	31	49	−18	18	Relegation to 1. deild
10	B68 Toftir (R)	27	0	7	20	20	80	−60	7	Relegation to 1. deild

Source: Faroe Soccer, Soccerway
Rules for classification: 1) Points; 2) Goal difference; 3) Goals scored.
(C) Champions; (R) Relegated

=== Positions by round ===
Team ╲ Round	1	2	3	4	5	6	7	8	9	10	11	12	13	14	15	16	17	18	19	20	21	22	23	24	25	26	27
Víkingur Gøta	2	1	4	4	4	3	2	3	1	3	3	2	2	2	2	2	2	2	2	2	2	2	2	2	1	1	1
KÍ	4	5	7	5	5	5	5	4	2	2	2	1	1	1	1	1	1	1	1	1	1	1	1	1	2	2	2
NSÍ Runavík	7	4	3	2	2	2	4	5	5	4	4	3	4	4	3	3	3	3	3	3	3	3	3	3	3	3	3
B36 Tórshavn	1	3	2	3	3	4	3	1	3	1	1	4	3	3	4	4	4	5	5	4	4	4	4	4	4	4	4
HB	3	2	1	1	1	1	1	2	4	5	5	5	5	6	5	5	5	4	4	5	5	5	5	5	5	5	5
ÍF	9	6	6	7	7	6	6	6	6	6	6	6	6	5	6	6	6	6	6	6	6	6	6	6	6	6	6
TB	8	10	5	6	6	7	7	7	8	8	8	9	8	7	7	8	8	8	7	7	7	7	7	7	7	7	7
Skála ÍF	10	7	8	8	8	8	8	8	7	7	7	8	7	8	8	7	7	7	8	8	8	8	8	8	8	8	8
AB	5	9	10	10	9	9	9	9	9	9	9	7	9	9	9	9	9	9	9	9	9	9	9	9	9	9	9
B68 Toftir	6	8	9	9	10	10	10	10	10	10	10	10	10	10	10	10	10	10	10	10	10	10	10	10	10	10	10

== Results ==
=== Regular home games ===
Home \ Away	AB	B36	B68	HB	ÍF	KÍ	NSÍ	SKÁ	TB	VÍK
Argja Bóltfelag		2–3	1–1	0–1	2–3	1–1	1–2	0–0	3–2	2–2
B36 Tórshavn	2–1		3–1	3–2	4–1	0–1	3–1	1–1	0–0	0–2
B68 Toftir	2–2	1–4		0–1	1–2	0–3	0–5	1–1	1–1	2–2
Havnar Bóltfelag	0–0	0–0	1–0		1–0	4–2	3–4	1–0	4–1	1–1
ÍF Fuglafjørður	1–0	0–0	4–0	4–2		0–4	0–2	2–2	2–2	2–2
KÍ Klaksvík	5–1	1–1	4–1	1–0	2–4		1–3	2–0	1–0	2–0
NSÍ Runavík	2–1	2–1	2–1	1–2	6–1	2–0		2–0	2–1	1–3
Skála ÍF	1–0	1–0	0–0	0–3	1–0	0–1	0–2		5–1	1–3
TB Tvøroyri	1–0	0–1	4–1	0–1	0–3	0–1	2–1	1–1		0–2
Víkingur Gøta	3–0	1–0	4–0	1–0	3–1	0–2	2–0	4–1	2–1	

Updated to match(es) played on 16 October 2016. Source: Faroe Soccer
Legend: Blue = home team win; Yellow = draw; Red = away team win.

=== Additional home games ===
Home \ Away	AB	B36	B68	HB	ÍF	KÍ	NSÍ	SKÁ	TB	VÍK
Argja Bóltfelag			5–0			3–1		0–2		1–3
B36 Tórshavn	2–1			2–2	4–1		2–0		5–2	
B68 Toftir		0–1			0–2		1–3		3–3	
Havnar Bóltfelag	1–2		6–1		4–1	2–3				0–1
ÍF Fuglafjørður	2–0					1–3		1–1		1–3
KÍ Klaksvík		2–2	6–0				4–0	5–0	4–0	
NSÍ Runavík	4–1			0–0	7–1			1–0		4–2
Skála ÍF		0–2	5–1	2–2					0–1	
TB Tvøroyri	2–1			0–0	3–2		3–1			
Víkingur Gøta		2–0	5–1			1–2		4–0	1–0	

Updated to match(es) played on 22 October 2016. Source: Faroe Soccer
Legend: Blue = home team win; Yellow = draw; Red = away team win.

== Top goalscorers ==
As of 22 October 2016

Rank	Player	Club	Goals
1	(Faroe Islands) Klæmint Olsen	NSÍ	23
2	(Faroe Islands) Páll Klettskarð	KÍ	21
3	(Faroe Islands) Jóannes Bjartalíð	KÍ	17
4	(Faroe Islands) Sølvi Vatnhamar	Víkingur	14
5	(Nigeria) Adeshina Lawal	ÍF	13
5	(Netherlands) Albert Adu	TB	13
5	(Faroe Islands) Øssur Dalbúð	HB	13
8	(Faroe Islands) Árni Frederiksberg	NSÍ	11
8	(Faroe Islands) Patrik Johannesen	AB	11
10	(Serbia) Filip Đorđević	Víkingur	10
10	(Faroe Islands) Róaldur Jakobsen	B36	10
10	(Denmark) Sebastian Pingel	B36	10

== Attendances ==
#	Football club	Average attendance
1	KÍ Klaksvík	971
2	Víkingur Gøta	736
3	B36 Tórshavn	705
4	HB Tórshavn	635
5	AB Argir	541
6	NSÍ Runavík	458
7	ÍF Fuglafjørður	354
8	Skála ÍF	337
9	B68 Toftir	262
10	TB Tvøroyri	231
