= Maurice Ross =

Scottish footballer (born 1981)

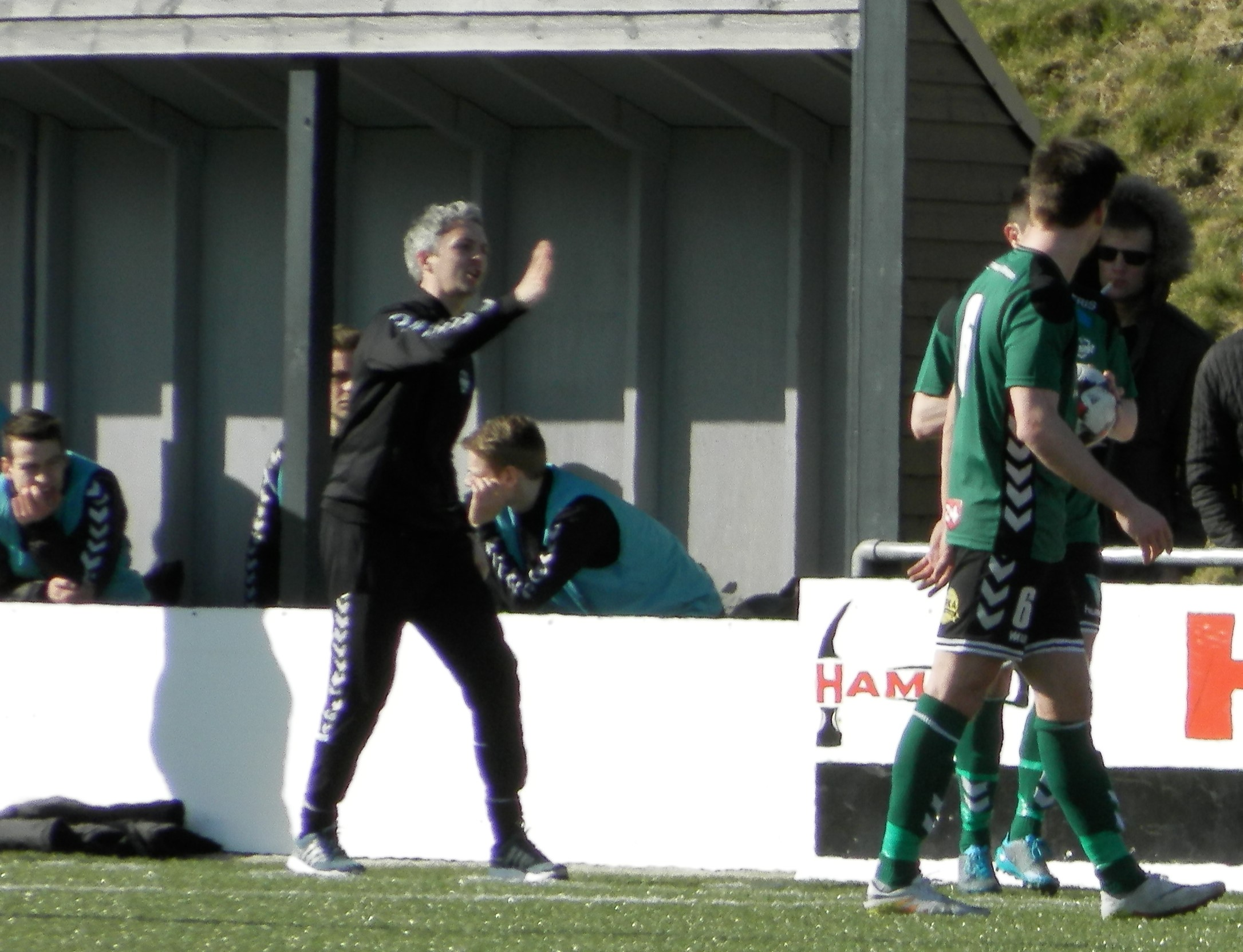
- Ross managing TB/FC Suðuroy/Royn in 2017

Personal information
- Full name: Maurice Alexander Ross
- Date of birth: 3 February 1981 (age 45)
- Place of birth: Dundee, Scotland
- Position: Right back

Senior career*
Years	Team	Apps	(Gls)
2000–2005	Rangers	78	(2)
2005–2006	Sheffield Wednesday	1	(0)
2005–2006	→ Wolverhampton Wanderers (loan)	4	(0)
2006	Wolverhampton Wanderers	14	(0)
2006–2007	Millwall	15	(0)
2007–2008	Viking	31	(0)
2009	Kocaelispor	10	(0)
2009–2010	Aberdeen	6	(0)
2010	Beijing Guoan	14	(0)
2011	Motherwell	6	(0)
2011–2012	Livingston	8	(0)
2012–2013	FK Vidar	13	(0)
Total		196	(2)

International career
2002–2003	Scotland	13	(0)

Managerial career
- 2013–2015: Sola FK
- 2015–2016: Egersunds IK
- 2016–2017: TB/FC Suðuroy/Royn
- 2017–2018: Víkingur
- 2021: Notts County (assistant)
- 2021–2023: Cowdenbeath
- 2023–: Fleetwood Town (assistant)
- * Club domestic league appearances and goals

Maurice Alexander Ross (born 3 February 1981) is a Scottish football coach and a former player.

Ross made his first senior appearance in professional football in February 2000 and played for eleven different clubs: Rangers, Sheffield Wednesday, Wolverhampton Wanderers, Millwall, Viking, Kocaelispor, Aberdeen, Beijing Guoan, Motherwell, Livingston and FK Vidar. In his time with Rangers he won all the domestic honours in Scotland. He played predominantly at right back and was capped by the Scotland national team 13 times.

== Playing career ==
=== Club ===
Ross joined Rangers as a trainee and made his senior debut in a 7–1 defeat of home town team Dundee, in February 2000. He captained the Rangers Under-21s to a reserve league championship win during 2000–01 but it was not until the 2002–03 season, under Alex McLeish, that he established himself on the first team. A highlight was scoring the opening goal of the 2005 Scottish League Cup Final.

Despite signing a four-year deal with Rangers in 2003, by August 2005 Ross had fallen out of favour at Rangers and was given a free transfer and moved on to Sheffield Wednesday. However the transfer did not prove to be a success as Ross only made two appearances for Wednesday and was later loaned to Wolves after only two months. In January 2006, Wolves made the loan into a permanent deal and Ross signed a six-month contract but he was released by Wolves at the end of that contract. Ross secured a new club at Millwall in the summer of 2006 and featured in the starting eleven for the first five games before being dropped to the bench after a string of poor performances.

In March 2007 Ross was signed by Viking from Stavanger, Norway. Ross agreed a three-year contract with Viking until the end of the Norwegian season late in 2009 but instead joined Turkish Super League side Kocaelispor in early February 2009. After Kocaelispor secured their league status that season but Ross, along with four other players, had their contracts terminated. On 12 October 2009, it was announced that Ross had asked the then Aberdeen manager Mark McGhee if he could use the facilities at Pittodrie, in order to gain fitness and ultimately a deal with another club. He signed a short-term deal with the Dons until January. Ross made it clear his intention was to move abroad during the winter transfer window and on 11 January 2010 it was announced that he signed for Chinese club Beijing Guoan. It was confirmed on 10 February 2010 that he joined the defending champions of Chinese Super League. Ross scored his first goal for the club in a 3–1 defeat to Seongnam Ilhwa Chunma in the 2010 AFC Champions League.

On 1 April 2011, it was revealed that Ross had signed a contract with Scottish Premier League side Motherwell until the end of the season. Ross then was released by the Fir Park club on 1 June 2011. On 13 October 2011 Ross signed for Livingston until January 2012.

=== International ===
Berti Vogts gave him a call up to the Scotland team after making just a few appearances for Rangers. Ross made his international debut against South Korea in 2002, and went on to feature in the team in the campaign to qualify for Euro 2004.

== Coaching career ==
After this third spell in Scottish football, Ross returned to Norway, initially to play and later coach, with FK Vidar and Sola FK respectively. He has since managed Norwegian club Egersunds IK, and Faroese clubs TB/FC Suðuroy/Royn and Víkingur.

On 24 January 2019, Ross re-joined Motherwell in a youth coaching capacity. Ross left Motherwell after the appointment of Graham Alexander as their manager.

Ross was appointed assistant manager of Notts County in March 2021. However, he spent only two months at the club, resigning from his post in May 2021 after making a racist remark about Dutch Notts County winger, Enzio Boldewijn. Ross made a full public apology for making the "clumsy, insensitive analogy".

In November 2021 Ross became the manager of Scottish League Two club Cowdenbeath. Despite signing several new players for the struggling Blue Brazil, the club ultimately finished bottom of League Two. The club was then relegated after a comfortable play-off defeat over two legs to Lowland League champions Bonnyrigg Rose. Ross opted to remain in charge at Central Park for the club's maiden Lowland League campaign, which got off to a horror start with the club earning just one point from its first five matches. Going into mid-August, pressure grew on Ross after the club's third loss against a youth team in just six games, a 3-0 Challenge Cup defeat to Kilmarnock B.

On 31 December 2023, he became assistant head coach to Charlie Adam at EFL League One side Fleetwood Town.

== Career statistics ==
=== Club ===
Club	Season	League		Cup		League Cup		Continental		Total	
Club	Season	Apps	Goals	Apps	Goals	Apps	Goals	Apps	Goals	Apps	Goals
Rangers	1999–2000	1	0	0	0	0	0	0	0	1	0
Rangers	2000–01	1	0	0	0	0	0	0	0	1	0
Rangers	2001–02	21	0	4	0	1	0	3	0	29	0
Rangers	2002–03	20	1	2	0	4	0	1	0	27	1
Rangers	2003–04	20	1	1	0	3	0	6	0	30	1
Rangers	2004–05	14	0	0	0	2	1	3	0	19	1
Rangers	2005–06	1	0	0	0	0	0	0	0	1	0
Rangers	Total	78	2	7	0	10	1	13	0	108	3
Sheffield Wednesday	2005–06	1	0	0	0	1	0	0	0	2	0
Wolverhampton Wanderers	2005–06	18	0	1	0	0	0	0	0	19	0
Millwall	2006–07	15	0	3	0	2	0	0	0	20	0
Viking	2007	17	0	4	0	–		–		21	0
Viking	2008	14	0	3	0	–		4	0	21	0
Viking	Total	31	0	7	0	–		4	0	42	0
Kocaelispor	2008–09	10	0	–		–		–		10	0
Aberdeen	2009–10	6	0	1	0	0	0	0	0	7	0
Beijing Guoan	2010	14	0	–		–		–		14	0
Motherwell	2011	6	0	1	0	0	0	0	0	7	0
Livingston	2011–12	8	0	0	0	0	0	0	0	8	0
Career total		187	2	20	0	13	1	17	0	237	3

=== International ===
Appearances and goals by national team and year
National team	Year	Apps	Goals
Scotland	2002	8	0
Scotland	2003	5	0
Total		13	0

=== Managerial record ===
As of match played 20 July 2022

Managerial record by team and tenure
Team	Nat	From	To	Record					Ref.
Team	Nat	From	To	G	W	D	L	Win %	Ref.
Cowdenbeath	(Scotland)	2 November 2021	23 March 2023	31	6	5	20	19.35	
Career Total				31	6	5	20	19.35	—

- Scottish statistics only.

== Honours ==
=== Player ===
Rangers

- Scottish Premier League: 2002–03, 2004–05
- Scottish Cup: 2001–02, 2002–03
- Scottish League Cup: 2002–03, 2004–05

=== Manager ===
FK Sola

- 3. divisjon: 2014
- 4. divisjon: 2013

Víkingur Gøta

- Faroe Islands Super Cup: 2018
