= 2017 1. deild =

1. deild
- Season: 2017
- Dates: 11 March – 21 October 2017
- Champions: AB
- Relegated: B36 Tórshavn II; ÍF II
- Matches played: 135
- Goals scored: 588 (4.36 per match)
- Biggest home win: B36 Tórshavn II 32-0 ÍF II
- Biggest away win: ÍF II 1-13 HB II
- Highest scoring: B36 II 32-0 ÍF II
- All statistics correct as of 21 October 2017.

The 2017 1. deild was the 75th season of the second tier of football in the Faroe Islands. AB Argir won this season, allowing them to promote to the 2018 Faroe Islands Premier League. B36 Tórshavn II and ÍF Fuglafjørður II were both relegated to the 2018 2. deild. The season started on 11 March and ended on 21 October.

== Teams ==
Locations of the 2017 Faroe Islands Premier League teams

The bottom two teams from the 2016 season, B68 Toftir and AB, were relegated to the 2017 1. deild. They were replaced by EB/Streymur and 07 Vestur, champions and runners-up of the 2016 1. deild respectively.

Team	City	Stadium	Capacity
Giza/Hoyvík	Gundadalur	Gundadalur Niðari vøllur	500
B36 Tórshavn II	Tórshavn	Gundadalur	5,000
EB/Streymur	Streymnes	Við Margáir	2,000
Havnar Bóltfelag II	Tórshavn	Gundadalur	5,000
ÍF Fuglafjørður II	Fuglafjørður	Í Fløtugerði	3,000
KÍ Klaksvík II	Klaksvík	Injector Arena	4,000
NSÍ Runavík II	Runavík	Við Løkin	2,000
Skála ÍF II	Skála	Skála Stadium	1,500
TB/FC Suðuroy/Royn II	Trongisvágur	Við Stórá	4,000
Víkingur Gøta II	Norðragøta	Sarpugerði	3,000

Source: Scoresway

== League table ==
Pos	Team	Pld	W	D	L	GF	GA	GD	Pts	Promotion, qualification or relegation
1	Argja Bóltfelag	27	20	4	3	86	29	+57	64	Promotion to Premier League
2	Víkingur Gøta	27	15	6	6	52	28	+24	51	Promotion to Premier League
3	KÍ Klaksvík	27	15	4	8	64	36	+28	49	
4	B68 Toftir	27	14	4	9	60	43	+17	46	
5	Havnar Bóltfelag	27	11	6	10	62	49	+13	39	
6	NSÍ Runavík	27	12	3	12	69	61	+8	39	
7	FF Giza/FC Hoyvík	27	9	9	9	50	48	+2	36	
8	FC Suðuroy	27	9	4	14	49	70	−21	31	
9	B36 Tórshavn	27	7	6	14	82	63	+19	27	Relegation to 2018 Faroe Islands 2. Deild
10	Ítróttarfelag Fuglafjarðar	27	0	0	27	14	170	−156	0	Relegation to 2018 Faroe Islands 2. Deild

Updated to match(es) played on 21 October 2017. Source: https://nl.soccerway.com/teams/faroe-islands/if-fuglafjordur/14982/
Rules for classification: 1) points; 2) goal difference; 3) number of goals scored
