= 2017 Faroe Islands Premier League =

Faroe Islands Premier League
- Season: 2017
- Dates: 12 March – 20 October 2017
- Champions: Víkingur Gøta
- Relegated: ÍF
- Champions League: Víkingur
- Europa League: KÍ; B36; NSÍ
- Matches: 135
- Goals: 429 (3.18 per match)
- Top goalscorer: (Nigeria) Adeshina Lawal
- Biggest home win: KÍ 6–0 EB/Streymur
- Biggest away win: 07 Vestur 0–7 NSÍ Runavík
- Highest scoring: B36 3–5 Víkingur Gøta
- All statistics correct as of 21 October 2017.

The 2017 Faroe Islands Premier League (also known as Effodeildin for sponsorship reasons) was the 75th season of top-tier football in the Faroe Islands. Víkingur Gøta successfully defended their first Faroese title from the previous season. The season began on 12 March 2017 and ended on 20 October 2017.

== Teams ==
Locations of the 2017 Faroe Islands Premier League teams

The bottom two teams from the 2016 season, B68 Toftir and AB, were relegated to the 2017 1. deild. They were replaced by EB/Streymur and 07 Vestur, champions and runners-up of the 2016 1. deild respectively.

Prior to the start of the 2017 season, TB were merged with the other two clubs from the island of Suðuroy: FC Suðuroy and Royn Hvalba. The new club will get a new name for the 2018 season, but for the 2017 season the club will be called TB/FC Suðuroy/Royn.

Team	City	Stadium	Capacity
07 Vestur	Sørvágur	á Dungasandi	500
B36 Tórshavn	Tórshavn	Gundadalur	5,000
EB/Streymur	Streymnes	Við Margáir	2,000
HB	Tórshavn	Gundadalur	5,000
ÍF	Fuglafjørður	Í Fløtugerði	3,000
KÍ	Klaksvík	Við Djúpumýrar	4,000
NSÍ Runavík	Runavík	Við Løkin	2,000
Skála	Skála	Undir Mýruhjalla	1,500
TB/FC Suðuroy/Royn	Trongisvágur	Við Stórá	4,000
Víkingur Gøta	Norðragøta	Sarpugerði	3,000

Source: Scoresway

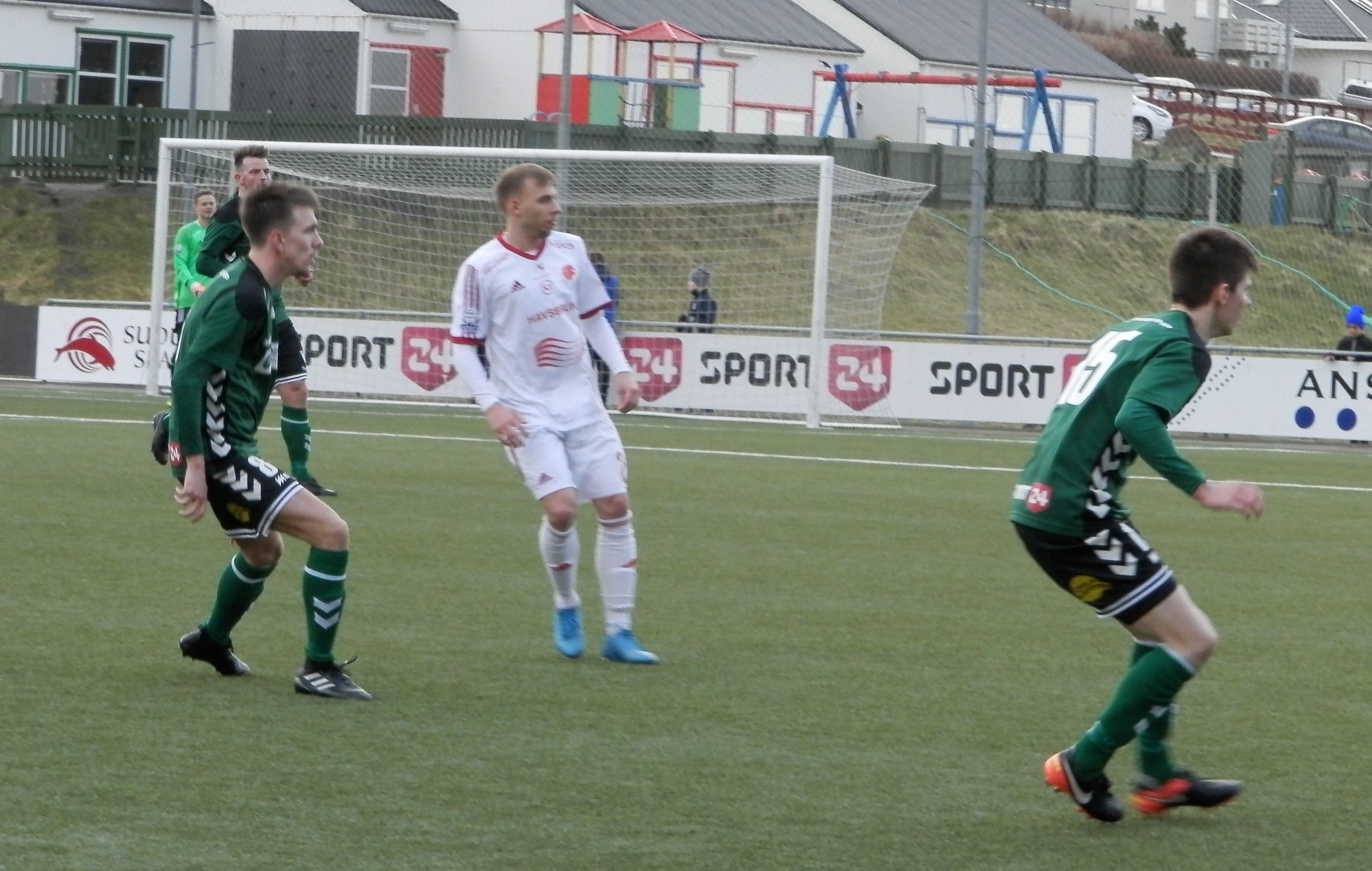
TB/FC Suðuroy/Royn (in green) playing their first match, which was in the first round of Effodeildin against ÍF Fuglafjørður.

== League table ==
Pos	Team	Pld	W	D	L	GF	GA	GD	Pts	Qualification or relegation
1	Víkingur Gøta (C)	27	15	7	5	62	33	+29	52	Qualification for the Champions League first qualifying round
2	KÍ	27	14	10	3	50	26	+24	52	Qualification for the Europa League preliminary round
3	B36 Tórshavn	27	13	9	5	62	39	+23	48	Qualification for the Europa League preliminary round
4	NSÍ Runavík	27	13	7	7	57	35	+22	46	Qualification for the Europa League first qualifying round (Note: NSÍ Runavík qualified for the Europa League first qualifying round by winning the 2017 Faroe Islands Cup.)
5	HB	27	10	9	8	43	31	+12	39	
6	Skála	27	8	9	10	31	40	−9	33	
7	EB/Streymur	27	9	5	13	34	49	−15	32	
8	TB/FC Suðuroy/Royn	27	8	5	14	31	45	−14	29	
9	07 Vestur	27	8	4	15	37	59	−22	28	
10	ÍF (R)	27	3	3	21	23	73	−50	12	Relegation to 1. deild (Note: 07 Vestur was not relegated to 1. deild because Víkingur II ended as runners-up and reserve teams cannot play in the first division.)

Updated to match(es) played on 21 October 2017. Source: Faroe Soccer (in Faroese), Soccerway
Rules for classification: 1) Points; 2) Goal difference; 3) Goals scored.
(C) Champions; (R) Relegated

=== Positions by round ===
Team ╲ Round	1	2	3	4	5	6	7	8	9	10	11	12	13	14	15	16	17	18	19	20	21	22	23	24	25	26	27
Víkingur Gøta	6	3	1	1	2	1	1	2	2	2	2	1	1	1	1	1	1	1	1	1	1	1	1	1	1	1	1
KÍ	7	6	3	3	3	3	2	1	1	1	1	2	2	2	2	2	3	3	3	2	2	2	3	2	3	2	2
B36 Tórshavn	3	5	7	5	8	5	6	6	4	4	6	6	5	4	4	4	4	4	4	4	3	3	2	3	2	3	3
NSÍ Runavík	5	8	8	8	5	4	4	3	3	3	3	3	3	3	3	3	2	2	2	3	4	4	4	4	4	4	4
HB	1	2	4	4	4	6	5	5	6	5	4	4	6	6	6	5	5	5	5	5	5	5	5	5	5	5	5
Skála ÍF	8	7	9	10	10	9	8	9	7	8	8	9	8	7	8	8	8	7	8	8	7	7	6	6	7	6	6
EB/Streymur	4	9	6	7	9	10	10	8	8	7	7	7	7	8	7	7	6	6	7	7	8	8	7	8	8	8	7
TB/FC Suðuroy/Royn	2	1	2	2	1	2	3	4	5	6	5	5	4	5	5	6	7	8	6	6	6	6	8	7	6	7	8
07 Vestur	10	10	10	9	6	7	7	7	9	9	9	8	9	9	9	9	9	9	9	9	9	9	9	9	9	9	9*
ÍF	9	4	5	6	7	8	9	10	10	10	10	10	10	10	10	10	10	10	10	10	10	10	10	10	10	10	10

Notes: * 07 Vestur could not be relegated, because there was only one team from 1. deild which could be promoted. Number two and three in 1. deild already have a team in Effodeildin, and B68 which don't have a team in Effodeildin was number four in 1. deild, which is not enough in order to be promoted to Effodeildin.

== Results ==
Each team plays three times (either twice at home and once away or once at home and twice away) against every other team for a total of 27 matches each.

=== Regular home games ===
Home \ Away	07V	B36	EBS	HB	ÍF	KÍ	NSÍ	SKÁ	TBF	VÍK
07 Vestur	—	4–3	2–2	1–4	3–2	0–2	0–7	1–1	0–1	2–4
B36 Tórshavn	4–0	—	1–0	2–2	4–0	1–1	2–2	2–1	3–0	3–5
EB/Streymur	0–2	0–0	—	1–0	2–4	2–1	0–3	1–2	1–0	1–5
HB	2–0	2–2	2–3	—	4–2	2–1	4–1	1–2	2–1	2–2
ÍF	0–1	1–5	3–1	0–0	—	1–4	0–3	0–1	0–4	1–1
KÍ	1–0	1–5	1–0	1–0	3–1	—	2–2	0–0	4–1	1–1
NSÍ Runavík	4–0	1–1	1–1	1–0	3–0	2–2	—	1–1	4–0	0–1
Skála	0–1	2–2	3–2	0–0	0–0	1–2	2–1	—	2–2	1–2
TB/FC Suðuroy/Royn	3–1	3–2	1–2	0–0	2–1	1–2	1–3	2–0	—	0–3
Víkingur Gøta	2–2	1–1	1–2	1–3	4–0	2–2	1–2	1–0	3–0	—

Updated to match(es) played on 15 October 2017. Source: Faroe Soccer (in Faroese)
Legend: Blue = home team win; Yellow = draw; Red = away team win.

=== Additional home games ===
Home \ Away	07V	B36	EBS	HB	ÍF	KÍ	NSÍ	SKÁ	TBF	VÍK
07 Vestur	—	—	—	—	—	1–1	2–3	5–0	3–1	—
B36 Tórshavn	2–0	—	—	—	4–2	1–3	2–0	—	—	—
EB/Streymur	3–0	1–2	—	2–1	—	—	—	—	2–2	0–1
HB	3–0	1–1	—	—	—	—	—	—	3–1	1–2
ÍF	1–5	—	1–2	2–1	—	—	0–2	—	—	1–5
KÍ	—	—	6–0	0–0	4–0	—	3–1	—	—	—
NSÍ Runavík	—	—	3–2	2–3	—	—	—	3–4	—	2–1
Skála	—	2–3	1–1	0–0	2–1	1–2	—	—	—	—
TB/FC Suðuroy/Royn	—	0–1	—	—	1–0	0–0	0–0	0–2	—	—
Víkingur Gøta	3–1	4–2	—	—	—	0–0	—	4–0	2–3	—

Updated to match(es) played on 15 October 2017. Source: Faroe Soccer (in Faroese)
Legend: Blue = home team win; Yellow = draw; Red = away team win.

== Top goalscorers ==
Rank	Player	Club	Goals
1	(Nigeria) Adeshina Lawal	Víkingur	17
2	(Faroe Islands) Klæmint Olsen	NSÍ	16
2	(Faroe Islands) Patrik Johannesen	B36	16
4	(Faroe Islands) Sølvi Vatnhamar	Víkingur	11
4	(Faroe Islands) Páll Klettskarð	KÍ Klaksvík	11
6	(Faroe Islands) Búi Egilsson	TB/FCS/Royn	10
6	(North Macedonia) Aleksandar Stankov	HB	10
6	(Netherlands) Albert Adu	KÍ	10
6	(Poland) Michal Przybylski	Skála	10
