= 2021 Faroe Islands Premier League =

Faroe Islands Premier League
- Season: 2021
- Dates: 6 March – 7 November 2021
- Champions: KÍ (19th title)
- Relegated: ÍF; TB Tvøroyri
- Champions League: KÍ
- Europa Conference League: HB; Víkingur; B36 Tórshavn
- Matches: 135
- Goals: 490 (3.63 per match)
- Top goalscorer: Mikkel Dahl (27 goals)
- Biggest home win: KÍ 8–0 B68 Toftir (18 May 2021)
- Biggest away win: 07 Vestur 0–9 KÍ (13 May 2021)
- Highest scoring: 07 Vestur 0–9 KÍ (13 May 2021)
- Longest winning run: 8 matches KÍ
- Longest unbeaten run: 20 matches KÍ
- Longest winless run: 19 matches TB Tvøroyri
- Longest losing run: 9 matches TB Tvøroyri

The 2021 Faroe Islands Premier League was the 79th season of top-tier football in the Faroe Islands, and the 17th under the current format.

HB were the defending champions, having won their 24th Faroese title in the previous season.

== Teams ==
Skála (relegated after five years in the top flight) and Argja Bóltfelag (relegated after three years in the top flight) were relegated after last season. They were replaced with 07 Vestur (promoted after a two-year absence) and B68 Toftir (promoted after a four-year absence).

| Team | City | Stadium | Capacity |
|---|---|---|---|
| 07 Vestur | Sørvágur | á Dungasandi | 2,000 |
| B36 Tórshavn | Tórshavn | Gundadalur | 5,000 |
| B68 Toftir | Toftir | Svangaskarð | 6,000 |
| EB/Streymur | Streymnes | Við Margáir | 2,000 |
| Havnar Bóltfelag | Tórshavn | Gundadalur | 5,000 |
| Ítróttarfelag Fuglafjarðar | Fuglafjørður | Í Fløtugerði | 3,000 |
| Klaksvíkar Ítróttarfelag | Klaksvík | Við Djúpumýrar | 4,000 |
| NSÍ Runavík | Runavík | Við Løkin | 2,000 |
| Tvøroyrar Bóltfelag | Tvøroyri | Við Stórá | 4,000 |
| Víkingur Gøta | Norðragøta | Sarpugerði | 3,000 |

== League table ==
| Pos | Team | Pld | W | D | L | GF | GA | GD | Pts | Qualification or relegation |
|---|---|---|---|---|---|---|---|---|---|---|
| 1 | KÍ (C) | 27 | 23 | 3 | 1 | 99 | 12 | +87 | 72 | Qualification for the Champions League first qualifying round |
| 2 | Havnar Bóltfelag | 27 | 19 | 4 | 4 | 87 | 22 | +65 | 61 | Qualification for the Europa Conference League first qualifying round |
| 3 | Víkingur | 27 | 18 | 6 | 3 | 59 | 27 | +32 | 60 | Qualification for the Europa Conference League first qualifying round |
| 4 | NSÍ Runavík | 27 | 14 | 5 | 8 | 54 | 38 | +16 | 47 | |
| 5 | B36 Tórshavn | 27 | 12 | 9 | 6 | 51 | 33 | +18 | 45 | Qualification for the Europa Conference League first qualifying round (Note: B36 Tórshavn qualified for the Europa Conference League first qualifying round by winning the 2021 Faroe Islands Cup.) |
| 6 | 07 Vestur | 27 | 8 | 4 | 15 | 36 | 74 | −38 | 28 | |
| 7 | EB/Streymur | 27 | 7 | 4 | 16 | 28 | 53 | −25 | 25 | |
| 8 | B68 Toftir | 27 | 7 | 4 | 16 | 33 | 66 | −33 | 25 | |
| 9 | ÍF (R) | 27 | 4 | 4 | 19 | 26 | 70 | −44 | 16 | Relegation to 1. deild |
| 10 | TB Tvøroyri (R) | 27 | 0 | 3 | 24 | 17 | 95 | −78 | 3 | Relegation to 1. deild |

Source: Flashscore
Rules for classification: 1) Points; 2) Goal difference; 3) Goals scored.
(C) Champions; (R) Relegated

== Fixtures and results ==
Each team plays three times (either twice at home and once away or once at home and twice away) against each other team for a total of 27 matches each.

=== Rounds 1–18 ===
| Home \ Away | B36 | EBS | HAV | KÍ | NSÍ | TBT | TOF | VES | VÍK | ÍF |
|---|---|---|---|---|---|---|---|---|---|---|
| B36 Tórshavn | | 2–1 | 2–4 | 0–0 | 1–1 | 3–0 | 0–0 | 1–1 | 1–1 | 2–2 |
| EB/Streymur | 0–4 | | 0–3 | 0–4 | 2–1 | 5–2 | 3–2 | 1–3 | 0–0 | 1–1 |
| Havnar Bóltfelag | 0–0 | 4–1 | | 2–3 | 5–2 | 6–0 | 1–0 | 7–0 | 1–2 | 6–1 |
| KÍ | 4–0 | 3–0 | 2–2 | | 2–0 | 4–0 | 8–0 | 4–0 | 3–0 | 4–0 |
| NSÍ Runavík | 4–2 | 3–0 | 0–0 | 0–3 | | 3–0 | 4–3 | 1–1 | 1–1 | 3–0 |
| TB Tvøroyri | 0–4 | 1–1 | 0–4 | 0–5 | 0–2 | | 0–1 | 2–4 | 0–6 | 0–1 |
| B68 Toftir | 1–3 | 2–1 | 0–6 | 0–4 | 1–2 | 2–2 | | 1–2 | 0–6 | 3–1 |
| 07 Vestur | 0–2 | 1–3 | 0–5 | 0–5 | 2–4 | 3–1 | 3–2 | | 2–4 | 1–0 |
| Víkingur | 1–0 | 3–1 | 2–1 | 1–2 | 2–1 | 1–0 | 3–1 | 4–1 | | 5–1 |
| ÍF | 0–5 | 2–1 | 0–2 | 1–4 | 1–1 | 3–1 | 0–1 | 3–1 | 1–2 | |

Source: Flashscore
Legend: Blue = home team win; Yellow = draw; Red = away team win.

=== Rounds 19–27 ===
| Home \ Away | B36 | EBS | HAV | KÍ | NSÍ | TBT | TOF | VES | VÍK | ÍF |
|---|---|---|---|---|---|---|---|---|---|---|
| B36 Tórshavn | | 3–2 | 2–2 | | | | 2–1 | | 2–0 | 5–0 |
| EB/Streymur | | | 0–1 | | | | 0–1 | | 1–1 | 1–0 |
| Havnar Bóltfelag | | | | 2–1 | 4–0 | | 5–0 | 5–0 | | 2–0 |
| KÍ | 3–1 | 2–1 | | | 2–0 | 7–0 | | | | |
| NSÍ Runavík | 2–0 | 4–0 | | | | 7–2 | | 2–0 | 0–2 | |
| TB Tvøroyri | 1–2 | 0–1 | 1–6 | | | | | 1–5 | | |
| B68 Toftir | | | | 0–5 | 0–1 | 6–1 | | | 2–2 | 2–0 |
| 07 Vestur | 2–2 | 0–1 | | 0–9 | | | 1–1 | | 1–2 | |
| Víkingur | | | 3–1 | 1–1 | | 1–0 | | | | 3–2 |
| ÍF | | | | 1–5 | 2–5 | 2–2 | | 1–2 | | |

Source: Flashscore
Legend: Blue = home team win; Yellow = draw; Red = away team win.

== Top goalscorers ==
| Rank | Player | Club | Goals |
|---|---|---|---|
| 1 | (Denmark) Mikkel Dahl | Havnar Bóltfelag | 27 |
| 2 | (Faroe Islands) Páll Klettskarð | KÍ | 18 |
| 3 | (Faroe Islands) Klæmint Olsen | NSÍ Runavík | 16 |
| 4 | (Faroe Islands) Andreas Olsen | Víkingur | 14 |
| 4 | (The Gambia) Bob Sumareh | KÍ | 14 |
| 6 | (Faroe Islands) Jóannes Bjartalíð | KÍ | 13 |
| 7 | (Faroe Islands) Sølvi Vatnhamar | Víkingur | 12 |
| 8 | (Faroe Islands) Adrian Justinussen | Havnar Bóltfelag | 10 |
| 8 | (Faroe Islands) Árni Frederiksberg | KÍ | 10 |
