= Inni í Vika =

Sports venue in Argir, Faroe Islands

Coordinates: 61°59′42″N 6°48′10″W

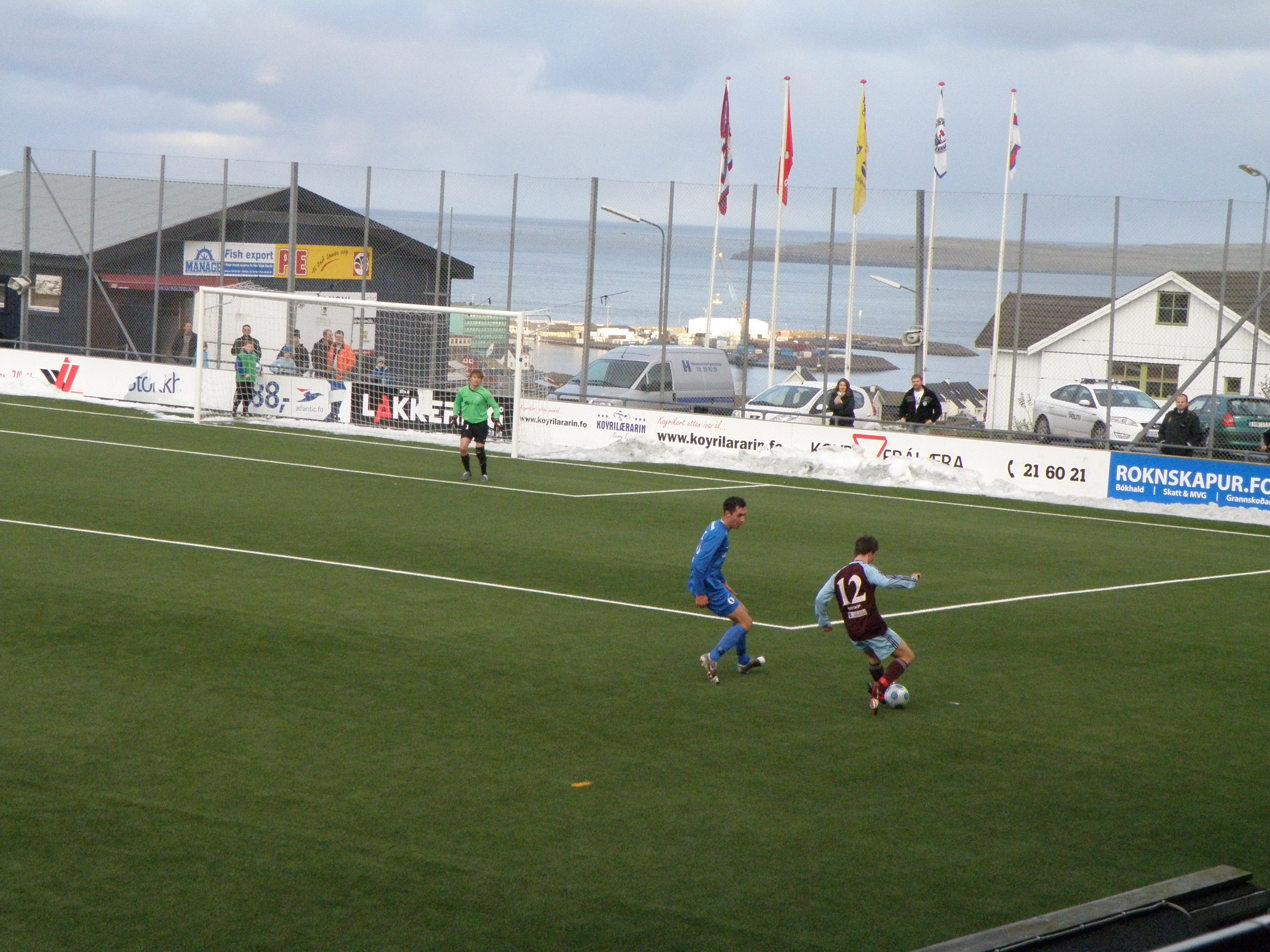
- AB vs. FC Suðuroy on 23 October 2010 at Inni í Vika; the home team won 1–0.
- Interactive map of Inni í Vika
- Former names: Blue Water Arena (2013–14)
- Location: Argir, Faroe Islands
- Capacity: 2,000 (415 seated)
- Surface: Artificial turf

Construction
- Opened: 1983
- Renovated: 1998, 2010

Tenant
- Argja Bóltfelag

Inni í Vika, currently known as Skansi Arena for sponsorship reasons, is a multi-use stadium on the sport site in Argir, Faroe Islands. It is currently used mostly for football matches and is the home ground of Argja Bóltfelag. The stadium holds 2,000 people and is the southernmost stadium of Streymoy island.

From August 2013 until early March 2015, the stadium was also known as Blue Water Arena, after an sponsorship deal with Danish transport company Blue Water.

== Upgrades in 2010 ==
On 29 July 2010, the Faroese National Day, Inni í Vika was reopened after being upgraded. The stadium got a new football field and a new sitting area with roof on the western side of the pitch from the Municipality of Tórshavn, which Argir is a part of. Jógvan Arge, who is chairman for Cultural Affairs of Tórshavn Municipality, held a speech and the mayor of Tórshavn Municipality Heðin Mortensen made the first football kick, kicking the ball to the chairman of AB Andrass Drangastein. Mr. Drangastein also gave a speech and after receiving the ball from the mayor, placed it in the center of the new artificial football field, ready for the match between AB and EB/Streymur.
