= Argir =

- Village
- Argir
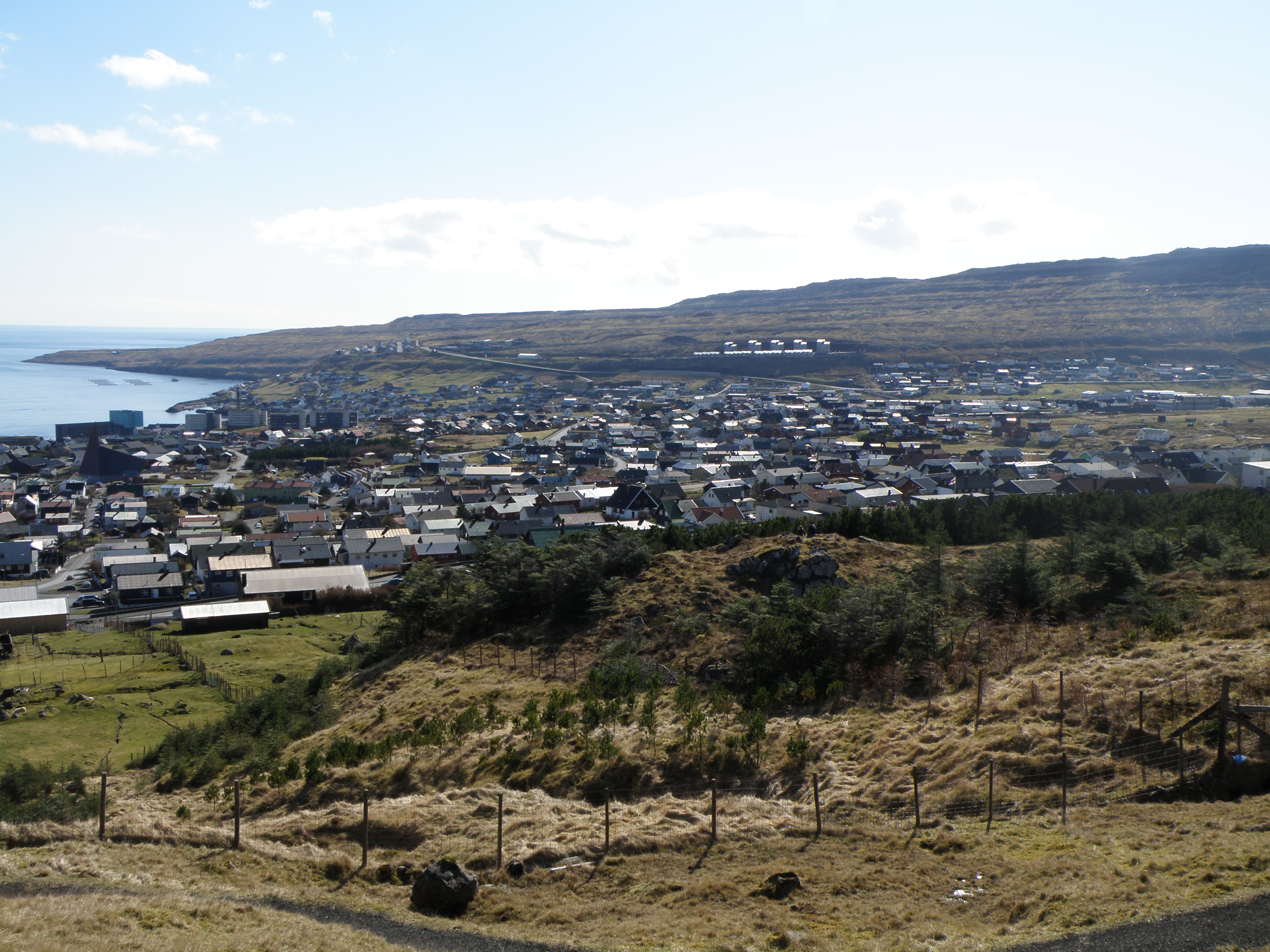
- Argir and a part of Tórshavn

- Location within the Faroe Islands
- Coordinates: 61°58′48″N 6°45′0″W
- State: Kingdom of Denmark
- Constituent Country: Faroe Islands
- Municipality: Tórshavn Municipality

Population (September 2025)
  - Total: 2,552
- ZIP code: FO 160

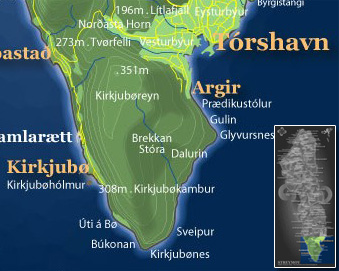
Map showing the position of Argir on Streymoy

Argir (Danish: Arge) is a village in the Faroe Islands.

Argir most likely takes its name from Old Irish airge, which means summer pasture.; several placenames in Faroe carry the same name with this meaning. Once a village south of Tórshavn, Argir has grown and merged with Tórshavn. In 1997, it joined the municipality of Tórshavn.

In recent years, more houses have been built in Argir, and the village, or quarter, has grown upwards into the hills. This area has views over the sea and the capital.

There is a boat harbour with boathouses in Argir and a church built in 1974.

From the 16th century until 1750, there was a leprosy-hospital in Argir. Some paupers lived there, too. When the hospital closed, the building became a workhouse for the poor. On 9 May 1828, Andreas Mortensen (1794-1875) bought Argir in an auction for 1005 "ríkis dálar." He moved there with his family and lived there until he died; his descendants have been a big part of the town's history, and a memorial stone was raised on 9 May 1948 in his honour.

Argir's football team is called AB (Argja Bóltfelag). It has a rowing club called Argja Róðrarfelag. Its boats are red and have a dragon head on the prow.

== Gallery ==
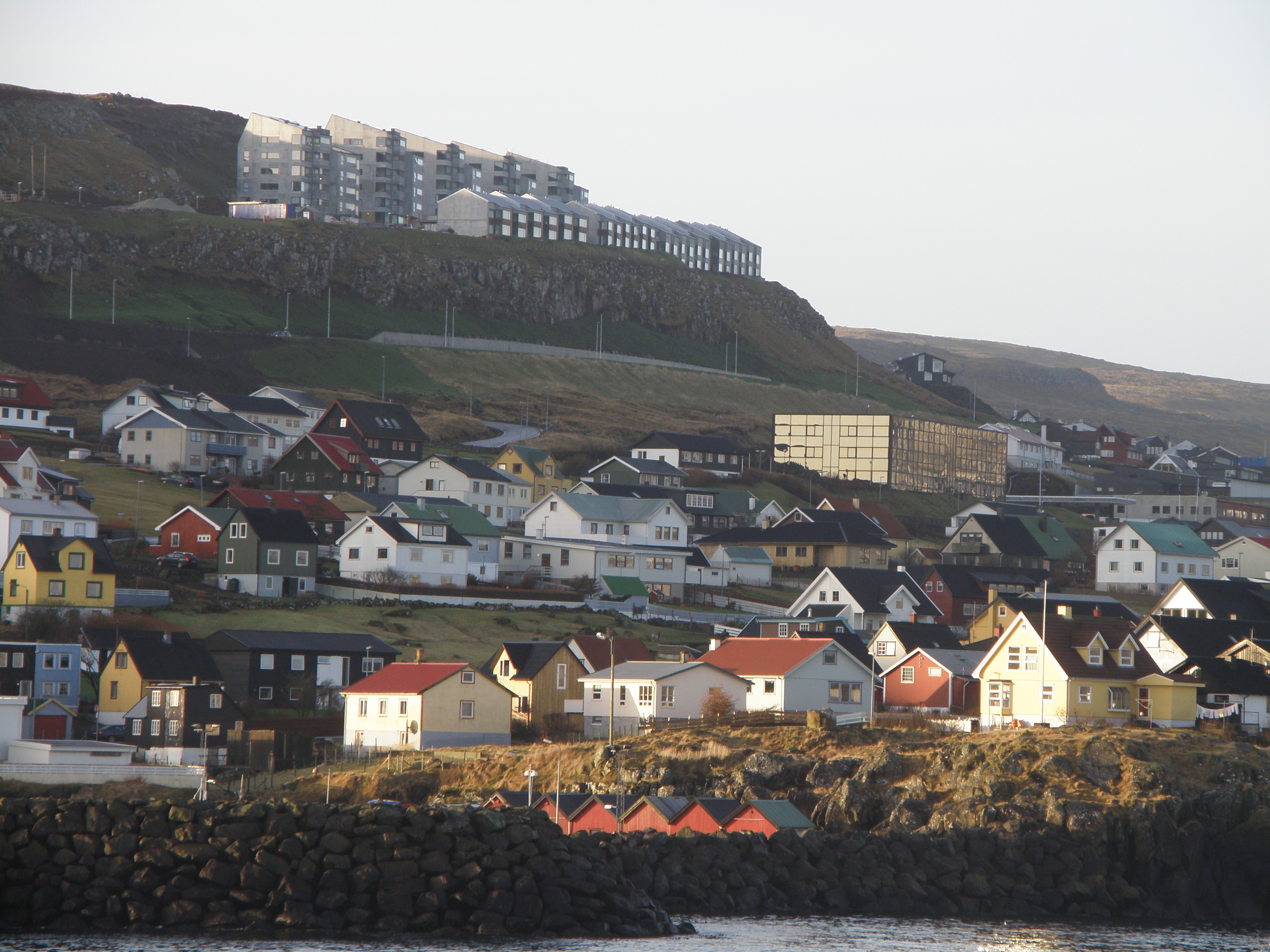
Argir, January 2010.

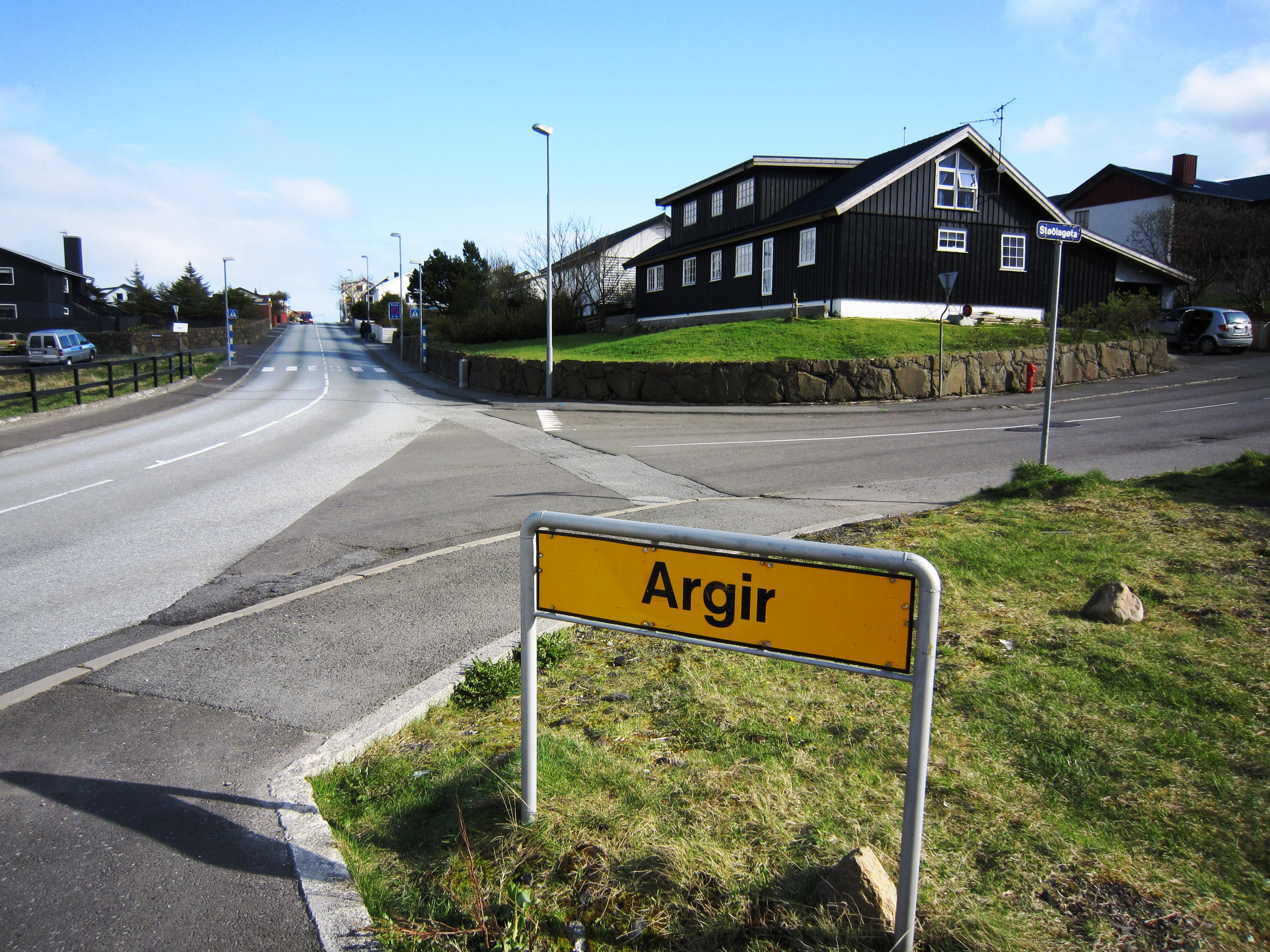
Argir, a sign with the village name.

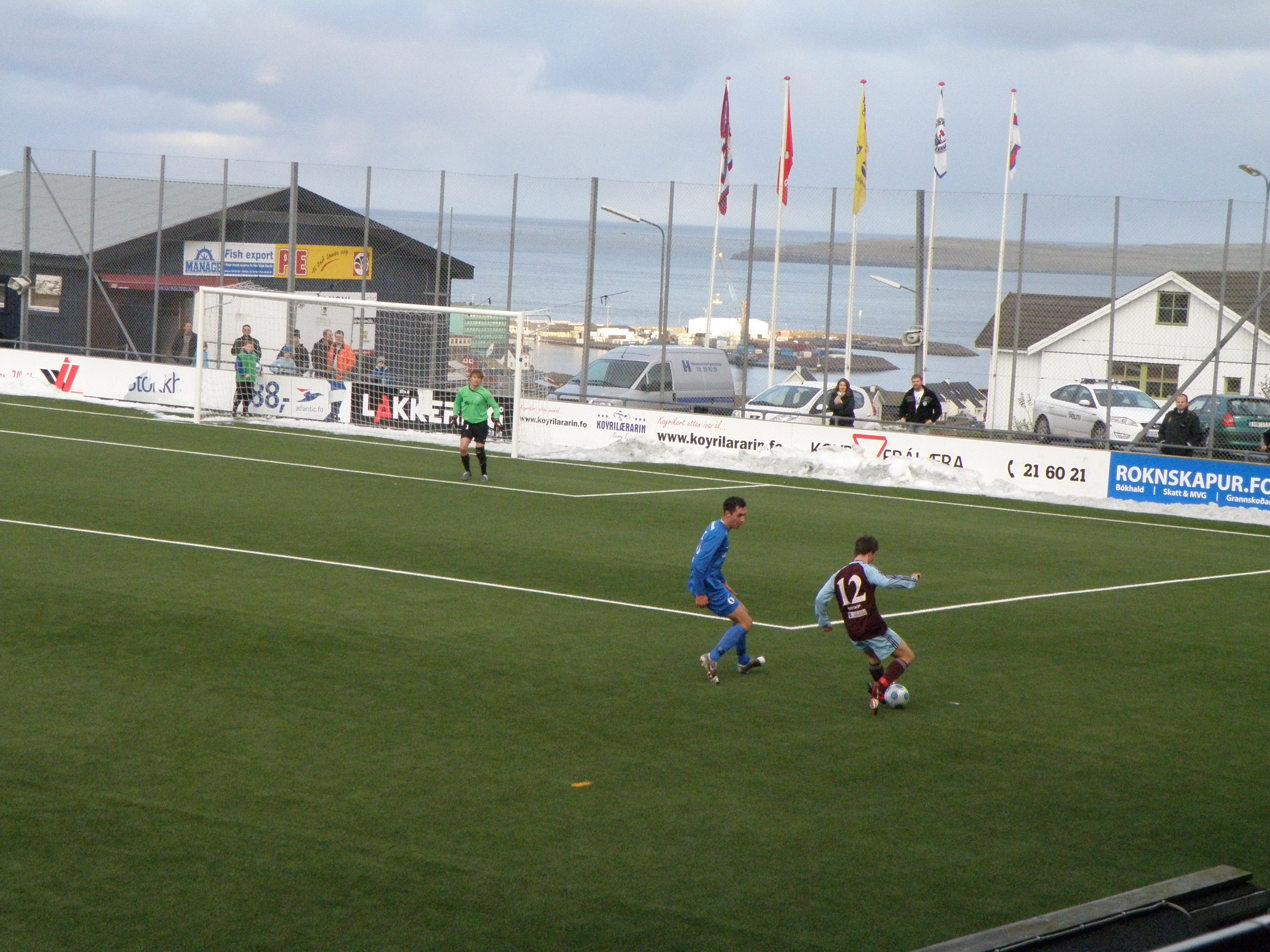
Inni í Vika football stadium of AB Argir.

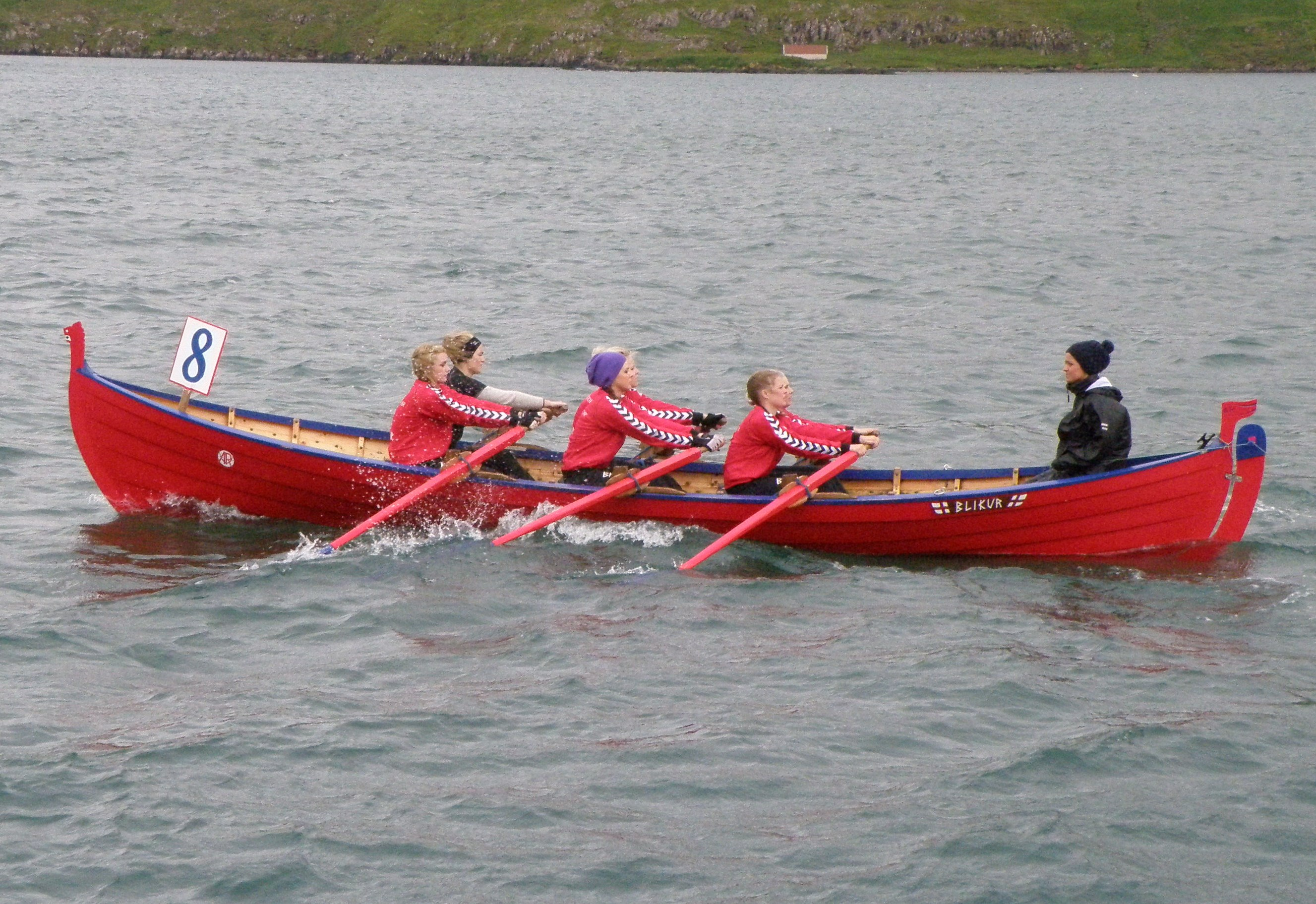
Blikur, one of the boats of Argja Róðrarfelag.

== See also ==
- List of towns in the Faroe Islands
