= TB/FC Suðuroy/Royn =

Former association football club in Faroe Islands

- Full name: TB/FC Suðuroy/Royn
- Nickname(s): Suðringar, Suðuroyarliðið
- Founded: 2017
- Dissolved: November 2018
- Ground: Við Stórá, Trongisvágur, Tvøroyri Municipality
- Capacity: 4,000
- Chairman: Poul Erik Smedemark, Julius Vest Joensen, Eyðfinn Debes, Símun Andreasen(avleiðingar)
- Manager: Poul Jacob Christiansen
- League: Effodeildin
- 2018: 7th
Home colours	Away colours

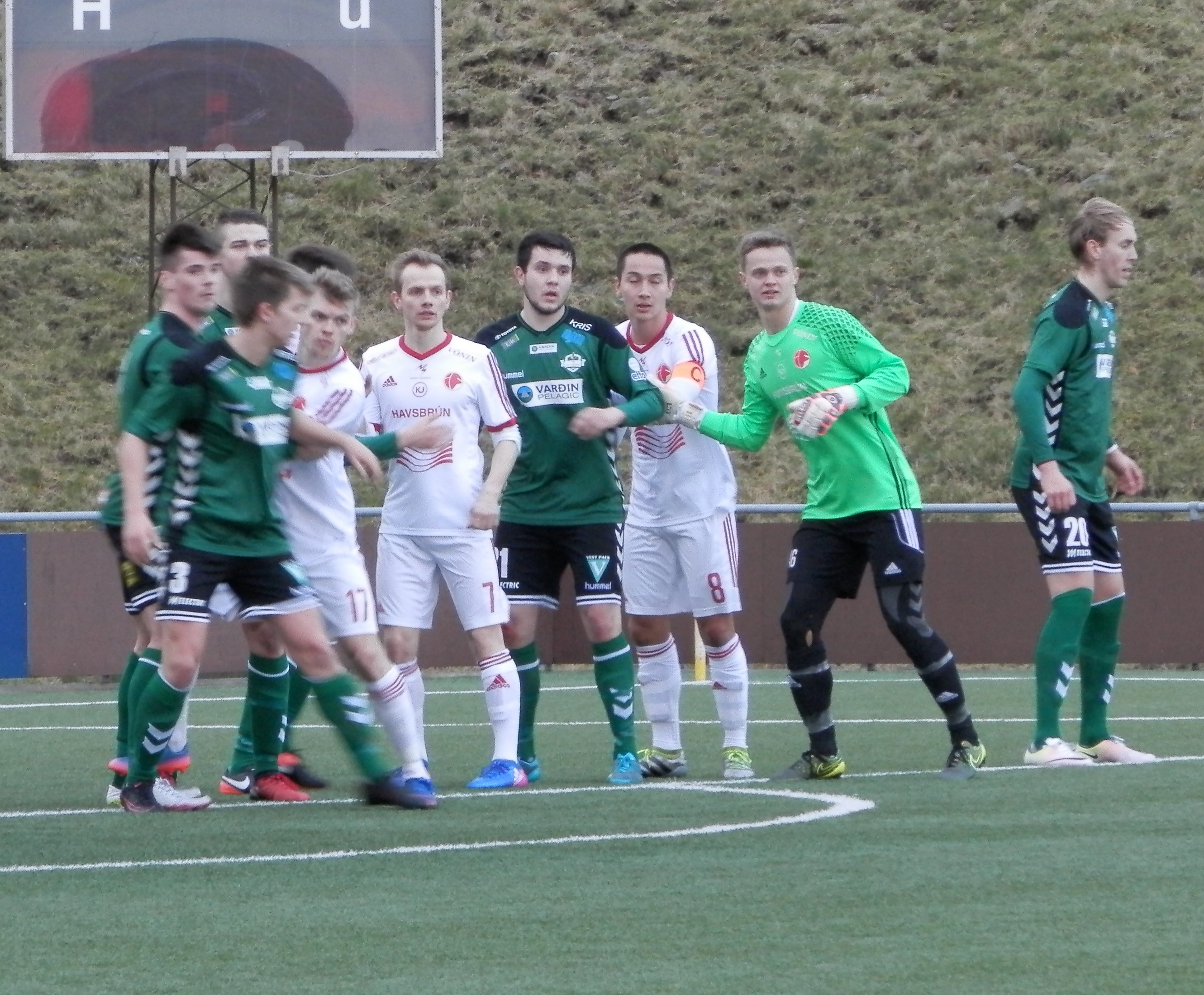
TB/FC Suðuroy/Royn (in green) in their first football match in the Faroe Islands Premier League in 2017, which they won 2–1 against ÍF Fuglafjørður.

TB/FC Suðuroy/Royn was a Faroese football club based in Trongisvágur. The team was a result of a merger between all three clubs from the island of Suðuroy: Tvøroyrar Bóltfelag, FC Suðuroy and Royn Hvalba. The agreement about the merger was so late that there was not enough time to find a new name and identity for the club, so the name was a combination of all three names of the clubs. The name was too long to use, so the media started to use the word Suðuroyarliðið instead, which means The team from Suðuroy and the supporters and the chairmen had agreed upon using the word Suðringar, which means People of Suðuroy.

The team got off to a very good start in the 2017 season. They had a new manager, the Scottish former international player Maurice Ross, and they had bought three Norwegian players. They also bought former FC Suðuroy player Jón Krosslá Poulsen and former TB Tvøroyri player Poul Ingason, who both had been playing for teams in the mid- and north-eastern part of the Faroe Islands and had decided to join the new team. TB/FC Suðuroy/Royn won their first match, which was against ÍF Fuglafjørður. They have been number one or two from the beginning and at least until the first five rounds, after winning four and losing one match, gaining 12 points. The fifth match was against B36 Tórshavn, the Faroese champions in 2014 and 2015. The match was played on 23 April 2017 on their home field Við Stórá in Trongisvágur in snowy and windy weather. B36 scored the first two goals, but then it turned in favour of the home team, who finished the game with a 3–2 victory. A team from the island Suðuroy didn't have such a successful start since TB in 1980; TB Tvøroyri would have had 12 points if 3 points were awarded for winning a match as it is today.

TB/FCS/Royn dropped form and finished the 2017 season only in 8th place. In the following year they finished one position better, but the merger collapsed after the season ended. TB inherited its place in the top division, FC Suðuroy resumed play in 2. deild and Royn in 3. deild.
