= Undir Mýruhjalla =

Stadium in Skála, Faroe Islands

Coordinates: 62°9′36″N 6°47′19″W

undir Mýruhjalla
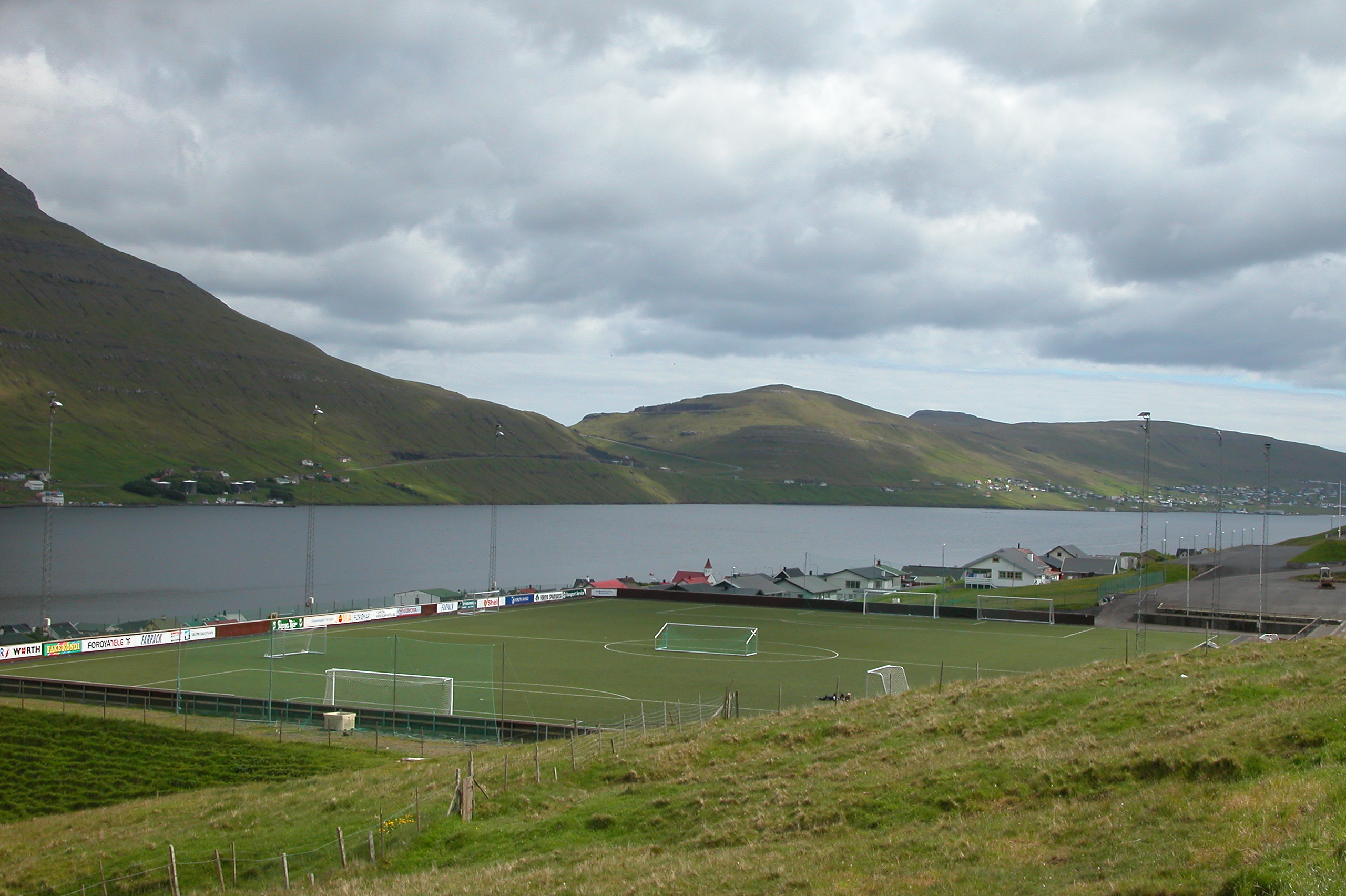
- Interactive map of undir Mýruhjalla
- Location: Skála, Faroe Islands
- Capacity: 1,000 (300 seats)
- Surface: Artificial turf

Construction
- Opened: 1968
- Renovated: 2007

Tenant
- Skála ÍF

Undir Mýruhjalla is a stadium in Skála, Faroe Islands. It is currently used mostly for football matches and is the home ground of Skála ÍF. The stadium holds 1,000 people and opened in 1968.

Undir Mýruhjalla hosted the Faroe Islands Cup final in 1984.
