= Við Stórá =

Stadium

Coordinates: 61.5623°N 6.8518°W

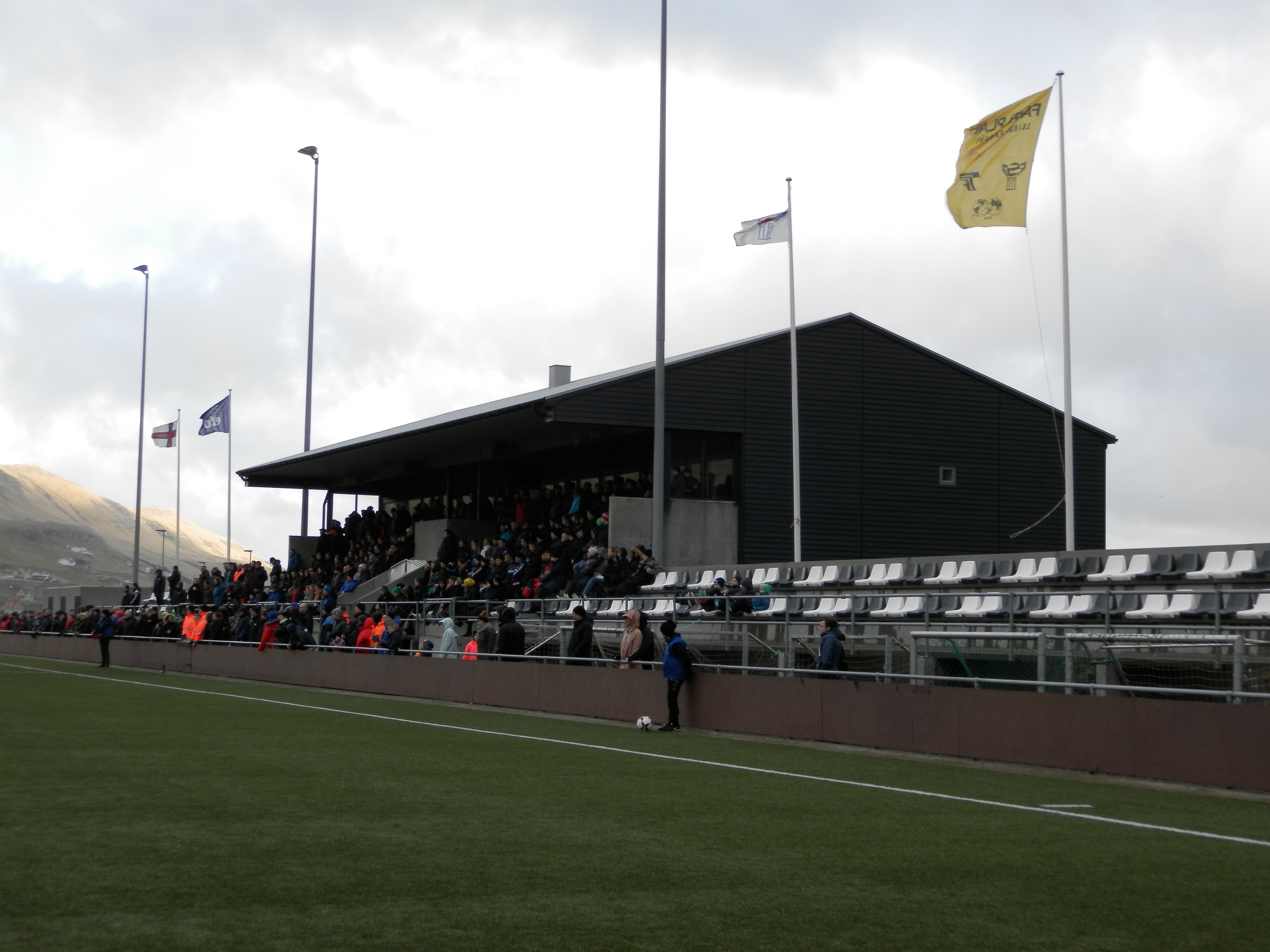
- Interactive map of Við Stórá
- Full name: Við Stórá
- Location: Trongisvágur, Faroe Islands
- Capacity: 1,600 (324 seated)
- Field size: 100 m × 65 m (109 yd × 71 yd)

Construction
- Built: 2011–12
- Opened: 29 April 2012

Tenants
- Tvøroyrar Bóltfelag (2012–16, 2019–); TB/FC Suðuroy/Royn (2017–18)

Við Stórá is a stadium located in Trongisvágur, Faroe Islands. It is mostly used for football matches and is the home ground of Tvøroyrar Bóltfelag.

== History ==
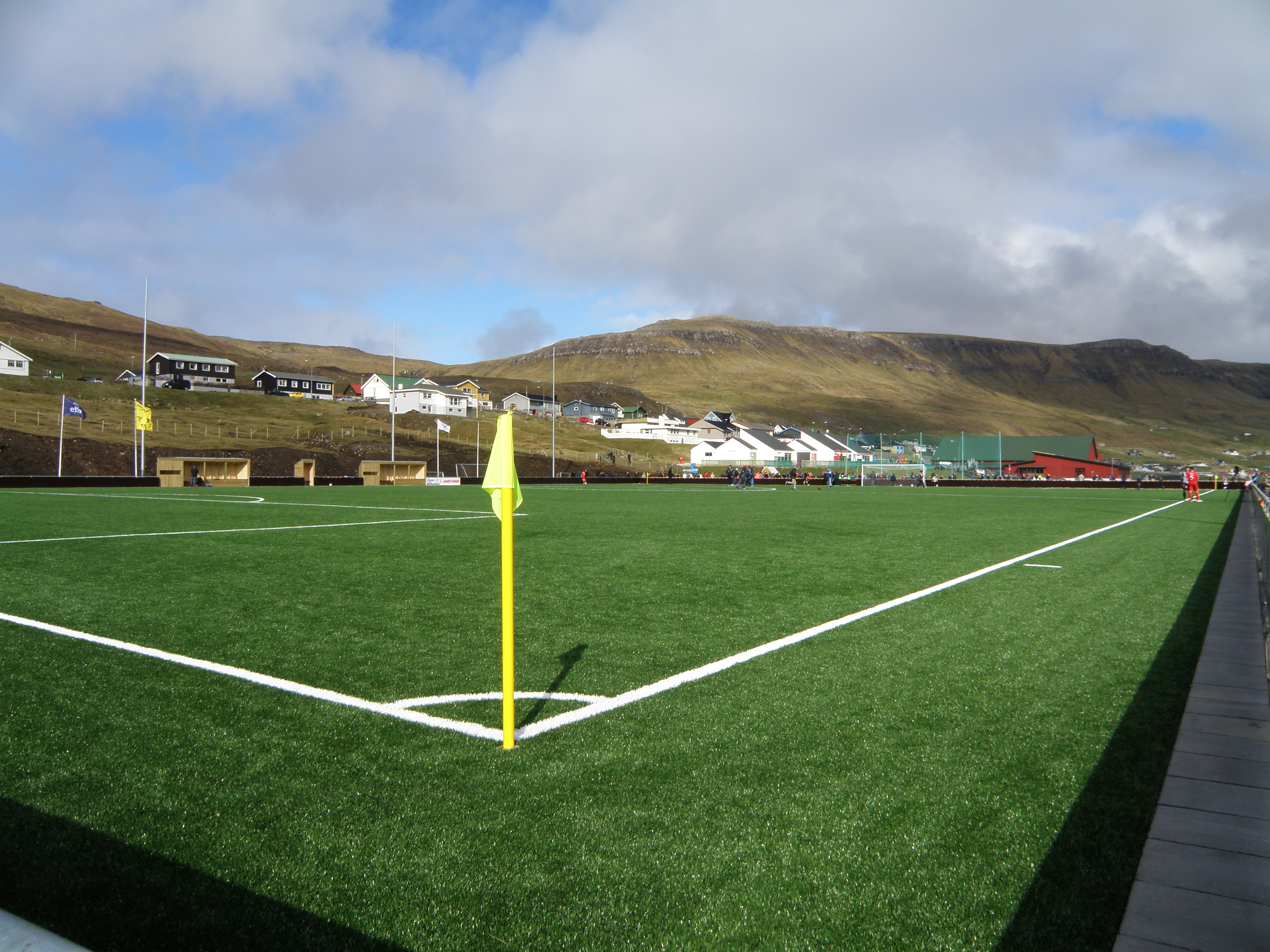
Stadium's pitch

The stadium replaced TB's old field Sevmýri as their home stadium. The first game played there was a 6th round first division match against ÍF, which TB won 1–0 with the goal scored by Serbian defender Dmitrije Janković.
