= Argja Bóltfelag =

Faroese football club

- Full name: Argja Bóltfelag
- Nickname: Frensurin
- Short name: AB
- Founded: 15 August 1973; 53 years ago
- Ground: Skansi Arena; Argir, Faroe Islands
- Capacity: 2,000 (415 seated)
- Chairman: Marius Thomassen
- Manager: Símun Eliasen
- League: Faroe Islands Premier League
- 2025: 1. deild, 2nd of 10 (promoted)
- Website: www.ab.fo
Home colours	Away colours

Argja Bóltfelag (AB) is a Faroese professional football club based in Argir. In 2020, they were playing their third season in the Faroe Islands Premier League, after being promoted from 1. deild after playing there for 1 season in 2017. After the 2020 season they ended as 9th and played a match against B68 Toftir from 1. deild, the winner would play in the Faroe Islands Premier League for the 2021 season. AB Argir lost the match 2–3 and were relegated to 1. deild. They play their home games at the Inni í Vika Stadium in Argir. In January 2024, AB Argir became a feeder club for F.C. Copenhagen.

== History ==
Argja Bóltfelag (or AB) was founded on 15 August 1973 by Danish resident Johnny Nyby and other football enthusiasts on Argjum. In the spring of 1974, the first board was elected. This composed of Johnny Nyby, Chairman; Fróði Olsen, Co-Chairman; Sonja á Argjaboða, accountant; and Kristian Arge, board writer. Other members of the board were Erling Olsen, Sæmundur Mortenen and Jens Hansen. In the same year, the team started in the regular competition.

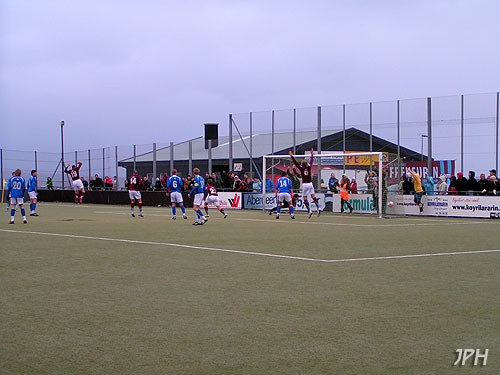
Inni í Vika Stadium AB scores against KÍ and wins 3–1

Initially the team didn't have very good training facilities and rented a school playground. Later they got a small ground to train on, but it was only 20 x 40 m^{2} in measurements. There was no football field on Argjum at the time, but they were allowed to loan the Gundadalur, which belongs to HB and B36. AB practiced and played their matches at the Gundadalur and this helped the team to survive.

In 1983, a football field was built on Argjum and now had better training facilities. Having their own ground helped the team a lot and in 1985, a new two-storey house was built for AB. AB got the lower storey and the second storey was used as a school classroom.

In 1998, artificial grass was laid on the football field. For some years, the second storey remained as a school classroom for young children. By 2004, AB had grown enough to get the whole house.

From 2000, Tórálvur Stenberg became the chairman of AB and he brought them from the 3rd division all the way to Formuladeildin in 2006. Sadly, he did not see AB play in Formuladeildina, because he died of cancer in the autumn. Stenberg was the first to become an honorary member of the team. He put his life and soul into Argja Bóltfelag. Two of his sons, Jónas and Heðin Stenberg, play for AB.

AB's first season in the Vodafonedeildin wasn't very successful and were relegated along with VB/Sumba, finishing in 9th place. Though in the season afterwards, they bounced right back and were promoted again after finishing runners-up in 1. deild. After spending three years (2014, 2015 and 2016) in the highest series, the team ended the 2016 season in 9th place and got relegated. Although in 2017, AB got promoted from 1. deild after playing there for 1 season in 2017. AB has then been in Betrideildin in 2018, 2019 and also in 2020.

AB´s second team has played in 2. deild, but in 2019 the team qualified to 1. deild for 2020. After the 2020 season the team was relegated to 2. deild.

== Honours ==
- 1. deild: 1

2017

- 2. deild: 1

2002

== First team squad ==
=== Current squad ===
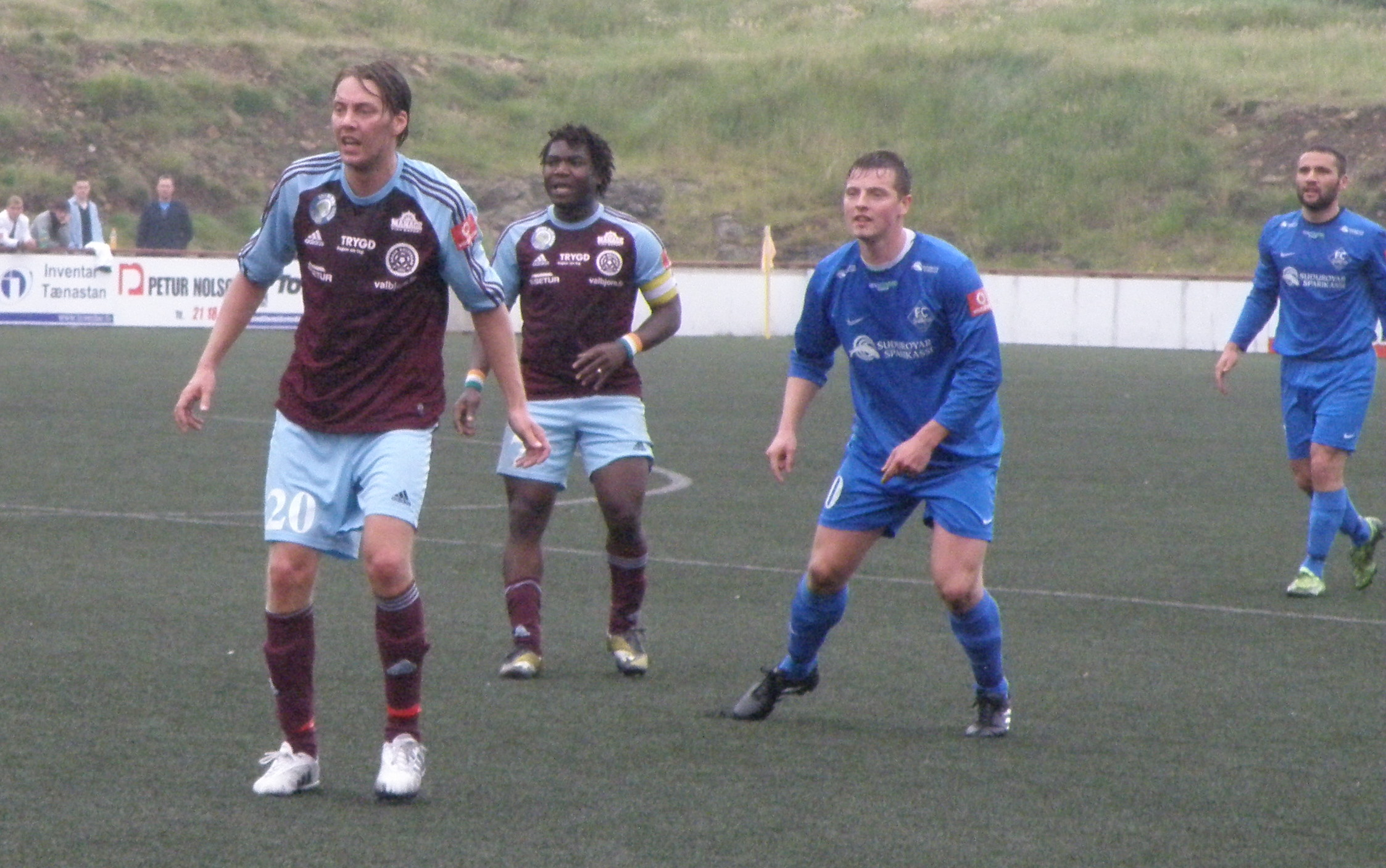
AB Argir in a match in Vodafonedeildin 2010 against FC Suðuroy.

As of 15 August 2026 Note: Flags indicate national team as defined under FIFA eligibility rules; some limited exceptions apply. Players may hold more than one non-FIFA nationality.

No.	Pos.	Nation	Player
1	GK	DEN	Jesper Sørensen
2	DF	FRO	Rói Wang
4	DF	FRO	Dánjal Danielsen
5	DF	FRO	Gunnar Reynslág
7	FW	FRO	Bjarki Nielsen (captain)
8	MF	DEN	Mathias Friis
9	DF	DEN	Luca Thorstensen
10	MF	FRO	Ragnar Skála
11	FW	FRO	Brian Jakobsen
13	DF	FRO	Tóki Rasmussen
14	DF	FRO	Jens Erik Bruhn
15	MF	FRO	Heðin Olsen

No.	Pos.	Nation	Player
16	GK	FRO	Torkil Skála
17	MF	FRO	Páll Eirik Djurhuus
19	DF	FRO	Sørin Samuelsen
20	MF	FRO	Sjúrdur Henriksen
21	DF	NGR	Jimmy Abdul
22	MF	FRO	Jóan Pauli Tórsson
23	MF	FRO	Jón Steingrimsson
25	GK	FRO	Rói Mørk Hentze
26	DF	FRO	Bárður Danielsen
28	MF	FRO	Ørvur Isfeld
30	FW	NGR	Obule Moses

== Technical staff ==
As of the year 2023.

- Manager: (Denmark) Henrik Larsen
- Assistant manager: (Denmark) Morten Overgaard
- U21 Manager: (Faroe Islands) Nikolaj Eriksen
- Fitness coach: (Faroe Islands) Sólrun Gleðisheygg

== Player of the year ==
Starting from 2006, the club has annually named its player of the year. Players still playing for the club are marked in bold:

- 2006: (Faroe Islands) Rúni Nolsøe
- 2007: (Faroe Islands) **Jónas Stenberg**
- 2008: (Faroe Islands) Allan Mørkøre
- 2012: (Faroe Islands) Leivur Holm Joensen

== Managers ==
- (Faroe Islands) Oddbjørn Joensen (2000–2001)
- (Faroe Islands) Sámal Erik Hentze (2002–2003)
- (Faroe Islands) Kári Reynheim (2004)
- (Faroe Islands) Jóannes Jakobsen (2005)
- (Faroe Islands) Rúni Nolsøe (2006)
- (Faroe Islands) Oddbjørn Joensen (January – May 31, 2007)
- (Faroe Islands) Sigfríður Clementsen (June 1, 2007 – Dec 31, 2007)
- (Faroe Islands) Allan Mørkøre (2008 – July 31, 2010)
- (Faroe Islands) Sámal Erik Hentze (Aug 1, 2010 – Dec 31, 2013)
- (Faroe Islands) Bill McLeod Jacobsen (Jan 1, 2014 – April 16, 2014)
- (Faroe Islands) Oddbjörn Joensen (April 17, 2014 – May 31, 2015)
- (Faroe Islands) Sámal Erik Hentze (June 1, 2015 – Dec 31, 2015)
- (Faroe Islands) Trygvi Mortensen (2016)
- (Faroe Islands) Kári Reynheim (2017)
- (Romania) Sorin Anghel (2018–2019)
- (Faroe Islands) Tonny Brimsvík (2020-2021) and (Faroe Islands) Símun Samuelsen (2020-2021)
- (Denmark) Jonas Dal (6 Aug 2021–present)

== Youth teams ==
Argja Bóltfelag also has youth teams. There are 16 youth teams, based on gender and age, with the youngest team for the age of 6–8 and the oldest for 21 years of age. There are more than 20 coaches for these youth players.

== See also ==
- Argja Bóltfelag Women's Team
- List of football clubs in the Faroe Islands
