= Faroe Islands Super Cup =

Stórsteypadystur
- Founded: 2007
- Region: Faroe Islands
- Teams: 2
- Current champions: KÍ Klaksvík (4th title)
- Most championships: HB Tórshavn (6 titles)
- 2026

The Faroe Islands Super Cup (in Faroese: Stórsteypadystur, or simply Stórsteypið) is a football competition contested between the Faroe Islands Premier League champions and the winners of the Faroe Islands Cup from the previous season.

== History ==
The Super Cup was introduced in 2007 as the Lions Cup (named after the charity organization Lions Club) and is now an annual event. All proceeds from the matches are donated to charity. Since its creation, the Super Cup officially opens the season of Faroese football.

== Editions ==
=== 2007 ===
7 March 2007
18:00 (UTC±0)

B36 Tórshavn	1 – 1	HB Tórshavn
Benjaminsen 2'	Report	Jespersen 12'
Penalties
Mikkelsen (penalty scored); Benjaminsen (penalty scored) dos Santos (penalty scored); Thomassen (penalty scored); A. Mørkøre (penalty scored)	5 – 3	(penalty scored) C. H. Jacobsen; (penalty scored) á Borg; (penalty missed) P. M. Joensen; (penalty scored) Nolsøe

Gundadalur, Tórshavn
Attendance: 500
Referee: Petur Reinert

=== 2008 ===
8 March 2008
15:00 (UTC±0)

NSÍ Runavík	4 – 0	EB/Streymur
Frederiksberg 56'; Ó. Hansen 65'; Dalbúð 76'; S. Jacobsen 80'	Report

Gundadalur, Tórshavn
Referee: Lars Müller

=== 2009 ===
29 March 2009
15:00 (UTC+1)

HB Tórshavn	3 – 1	EB/Streymur
á Lag 29'; P. M. Joensen 48'; Poulsen 87'	Report	Olsen 84'

Gundadalur, Tórshavn
Attendance: 600
Referee: Georg Rasmussen

=== 2010 ===
14 March 2010
15:00 (UTC±0)

HB Tórshavn	2 – 1	Víkingur
Benjaminsen 10'; Poulsen 86'	Report	Justinussen 56'

Gundadalur, Tórshavn
Referee: Rúni Gaardbo

=== 2011 ===
27 March 2011
16:00 (UTC+1)

EB/Streymur	2 – 0	HB Tórshavn
A. Hansen 29', 49'	Report

Gundadalur, Tórshavn
Attendance: 400
Referee: Pætur Albinus

=== 2012 ===
17 March 2012
13:00 (UTC±0)

EB/Streymur	2 – 1	B36 Tórshavn
Samuelsen 60'; A. Hansen 90+3'	Report	S. Joensen 10'

Gundadalur, Tórshavn
Attendance: 200
Referee: Kári á Høvdanum

=== 2013 ===
3 March 2013
16:00 (UTC±0)

EB/Streymur	1 – 0	Víkingur
Danielsen 43'	Report

Gundadalur, Tórshavn
Attendance: 200
Referee: Lars Müller

=== 2014 ===
10 March 2014 (Note: The match was originally scheduled to be played on 9 March 2014, 15:00 local time, but was later postponed to the next day.)
18:00 (UTC±0)

HB Tórshavn	1 – 2	Víkingur
Benjaminsen 52'	Report	B. Hansen 26', 79'

Gundadalur, Tórshavn
Attendance: 300
Referee: Rúni Gaardbo

=== 2015 ===
22 February 2015
15:00 (UTC±0)

B36 Tórshavn	3 – 3	Víkingur
Færø 5'; Jakobsen 20'; Eysturoy 58'	Report	S. J. Joensen 2', 39'; Justinussen 62'
Penalties
Jakobsen (penalty scored); Heinesen (penalty scored); Nielsen (penalty missed); Eysturoy (penalty scored)	3 – 5	(penalty scored) Olsen; (penalty scored) Jacobsen; (penalty scored) Vatnhamar; (penalty scored) Justinussen; (penalty scored) Gregersen

Tórsvøllur, Tórshavn
Attendance: 300
Referee: Eiler Rasmussen

=== 2016 ===
27 February 2016
19:00 (UTC±0)

B36 Tórshavn	0 – 1	Víkingur
	Report	S. Vatnhamar 66'

Tórsvøllur, Tórshavn
Attendance: 376
Referee: Alex Troleis

=== 2017 ===
4 March 2017
19:00 (UTC±0)

Víkingur	2 – 1	KÍ Klaksvík
G. Vatnhamar 39'; S. Vatnhamar 89'	Report	Splidt 49'

Tórsvøllur, Tórshavn
Attendance: 431
Referee: Dagfinn Forná

=== 2018 ===
3 March 2018
19:45 (UTC±0)

Víkingur	1 – 1	NSÍ Runavík
Lawal 18'	Report	Frederiksberg 6'
Penalties
Lawal (penalty scored); H. Hansen (penalty scored); S. Vatnhamar (penalty scored); Svensson (penalty missed)	3 – 2	(penalty scored) Frederiksberg; (penalty scored) Knudsen; (penalty missed) Dalbúð; (penalty missed) Justinussen; (penalty missed) Olsen

Tórsvøllur, Tórshavn
Attendance: 250
Referee: Alex Troleis

=== 2019 ===
3 March 2019
17:00 (UTC±0)

HB Tórshavn	1 – 0	B36 Tórshavn
Samuelsen 49'	Report

Tórsvøllur, Tórshavn
Referee: Jóhan Hendrik Ellefsen

=== 2020 ===
3 March 2020
19:00 (UTC±0)

KÍ Klaksvík	1 – 1	HB Tórshavn
Midtskogen 68'	Report	Justinussen 54'
Penalties
Andreasen (penalty scored); Danielsen (penalty scored); Bjartalíð (penalty scored); Došljak (penalty scored); Hyseni (penalty scored)	5 – 4	(penalty scored) Johansen; (penalty scored) Petersen; (penalty scored) Joensen; (penalty scored) Tshiembe; (penalty missed) Justinussen

Tórsvøllur, Tórshavn
Referee: Jákup Mohr

=== 2021 ===
28 February 2021
16:00 (UTC±0)

HB Tórshavn	3 – 1	NSÍ Runavík
Jakobsen 25'; Przybylski 30', 62'	Report	Olsen 26'

Tórsvøllur, Tórshavn
Referee: Rani Skaalum

=== 2022 ===
27 February 2022
16:00 (UTC±0)

KÍ Klaksvík	3 – 1	B36 Tórshavn
Bjartalíð 22'; Mikkelsen 43'; Joensen 48'	Report	Przybylski 89'

Tórsvøllur, Tórshavn
Attendance: 500
Referee: Rúni Gaardbo

=== 2023 ===
26 February 2023
15:00 (UTC±0)

KÍ Klaksvík	0 – 0	Víkingur
	Report
Penalties
Frederiskberg (penalty scored); Klettskarð (penalty scored); da Silva (penalty scored); Kronberg (penalty scored); Kassi (penalty missed); Hansen (penalty scored); Vilhelmsen (penalty scored)	6 – 5	(penalty scored) A. Gregersen; (penalty missed) Ellingsgaard; (penalty scored) A. L. Olsen; (penalty scored) A. Olsen; (penalty scored) Justinussen; (penalty scored) Vatnhamar; (penalty missed) Kallsberg

Tórsvøllur, Tórshavn
Referee: Eiler Rasmussen

=== 2024 ===
2 March 2024
14:30 (UTC±0)

KÍ Klaksvík	2 – 3	HB Tórshavn
Klettskarð 54'; Frederiskberg 82'	Report	Á. Samuelsen 60' (pen.); Á. Dam 72'; D. Reynheim 74'

Tórsvøllur, Tórshavn
Referee: Bjarki Danielsen

=== 2025 ===
1 March 2025
16:30 (UTC±0)

Víkingur	0 – 2	HB Tórshavn
	Report	í Soylu 26'; Pedersen 48'

Tórsvøllur, Tórshavn
Referee: Jákup Mohr

=== 2026 ===
28 February 2026
17:00 (UTC±0)

KÍ Klaksvík	1 – 0	HB Tórshavn
Mneney 56' (o.g.)

Tórsvøllur, Tórshavn
Referee: Høgni Madsen

== Winners ==
Team	Titles	Runners-up	Winning Years
HB Tórshavn	6	5	2009, 2010, 2019, 2021, 2024, 2025
Víkingur Gøta	5	4	2014, 2015, 2016, 2017, 2018
KÍ Klaksvík	4	2	2020, 2022, 2023, 2026
EB/Streymur	3	2	2011, 2012, 2013
B36 Tórshavn	1	5	2007
NSÍ Runavík	1	2	2008

== All-time top scorers ==
Rank	Name	Club(s)	Goals
1	(Faroe Islands) Arnbjørn Hansen	EB/Streymur	3
1	(Faroe Islands) Fróði Benjaminsen	B36 (1), HB (2)	3
1	(Poland) Michał Przybylski	HB (2), B36 (1)	3
2	(Faroe Islands) Rógvi Poulsen	HB	2
2	(Faroe Islands) Bárður Hansen	Víkingur	2
2	(Faroe Islands) Finnur Justinussen	Víkingur	2
2	(Faroe Islands) Sámal Jákup Joensen	Víkingur	2
2	(Faroe Islands) Sølvi Vatnhamar	Víkingur	2
2	(Faroe Islands) Árni Frederiksberg	NSÍ, KÍ	2

== See also ==
- Atlantic Cup
- Faroe Islands Cup
- Faroe Islands Premier League
