= 2018 Faroe Islands Cup =

Løgmanssteypið

Tournament details
- Country: Faroe Islands
- Teams: 15

Final positions
- Champions: B36 Tórshavn (6th title)
- Runners-up: Havnar Bóltfelag

Tournament statistics
- Matches played: 16
- Goals scored: 54 (3.38 per match)
- Top goal scorer(s): Adrian Justinussen; Kaimar Saag; Salmundur Bech (4 goals each)

The 2018 Faroe Islands Cup was the 64th edition of Faroe Islands domestic football cup. The competition started on 25 April and ended with the final on 25 August. NSÍ were the defending champions, having won their third cup title the previous year, but were upset in the first round by eventual semifinalists AB, becoming the first defending champion since 1992 to be knocked out in the first stage.

B36 won the cup for the 6th time and qualified for the Preliminary round of the 2019–20 UEFA Europa League.

Only the first teams of Faroese football clubs were allowed to participate. Teams from all divisions entered the competition in the first round. MB withdrew the competition. As a result, one team would advance directly to the quarterfinals.

== Participating clubs ==
2018 Betri deildin 10 teams	2018 1. deild 4 teams	2018 2. deild 1 team
07 Vestur; AB; B36; EB/Streymur; HB; KÍ; NSÍ ^{TH}; Skála; TB/FC Suðuroy/Royn; Víkingur	B68; B71; Giza Hoyvík; ÍF	Undrið

^{TH} – Title Holders

== Round and draw dates ==
Round	Draw date	Game date
First round	19 March	25 April
Quarterfinals	26 April	9 & 10 May
Semifinals	14 May	30 May & 13 June
Final	—	25 August at Tórsvøllur, Tórshavn

== First round ==
Entering this round are all ten clubs from Betri deildin menn, four from 1. deild, and one from 2. deild.

Team 1	Score	Team 2
TB/FC Suðuroy/Royn (1)	2–1	KÍ (1)
ÍF (2)	0–3	B36 (1)
NSÍ (1)	0–1	AB (1)
B68 (2)	0–4	HB (1)
Undrið (3)	0–3	EB/Streymur (1)
B71 (2)	4–0	Giza Hoyvík (2)
Skála (1)	1–0	07 Vestur (2)
Víkingur (1)	Bye	

== Quarter-finals ==
Team 1	Score	Team 2
AB (1)	2–2 (3–1 p)	EB/Streymur (1)
B36 (1)	2–0	Skála (1)
Víkingur (1)	0–2	TB/FC Suðuroy/Royn (1)
HB (1)	6–0	B71 (1)

== Semi-finals ==
Team 1	Agg.	Team 2	1st leg	2nd leg
HB	6–1	AB	2–0	4–1
B36	8–2	TB/FC Suðuroy/Royn	4–2	4–0

== Final ==
25 August 2018
19:45 WEST

B36 Tórshavn	2–2 (a.e.t.)	Havnar Bóltfelag
Færø 60' (pen.); Agnarsson 90+5'	Report	Jensen 56'; Justinussen 63'
Penalties
Færø (penalty scored); Mellemgaard (penalty scored); Olsen (penalty scored); Magnusson (penalty scored); Jakobsen (penalty scored)	5–4	(penalty scored) Andersen; (penalty scored) Egilsson; (penalty scored) Frederiksen; (penalty scored) Justinussen; (penalty missed) í Soylu

Tórsvøllur, Tórshavn
Attendance: 3,221
Referee: Kári á Høvdanum

== Top goalscorers ==
Rank	Player	Team	Goals
1	(Faroe Islands) Adrian Justinussen	HB	4
1	(Estonia) Kaimar Saag	B36	4
1	(Faroe Islands) Salmundur Bech	TB/FCS/Royn	4
4	(Faroe Islands) Benjamin Heinesen	B36	3
4	(Faroe Islands) Dan í Soylu	HB	3
4	(Faroe Islands) Jógvan Nolsøe	HB	3
7	(Faroe Islands) Ari Ellingsgaard	EB/Streymur	2
7	(Faroe Islands) John Frederiksen	HB	2
7	(Faroe Islands) Magnus Egilsson	HB	2
7	(Faroe Islands) Odmar Færø	B36	2
