= Michał Przybylski =

Polish association football player (born 1997)

Personal information
- Full name: Michał Damian Przybylski
- Date of birth: 27 December 1997 (age 28)
- Place of birth: Świnoujście, Poland
- Height: 1.75 m (5 ft 9 in)
- Position: Attacking midfielder

Team information
- Current team: NSÍ Runavík
- Number: 33

Youth career
- –2012: B68 Toftir
- 2013: NSÍ Runavík

Senior career*
Years	Team	Apps	(Gls)
2014–2015	NSÍ Runavík	7	(0)
2016	B68 Toftir	24	(3)
2017–2018	Skála ÍF	23	(10)
2018	Widzew Łódź	4	(0)
2018	→ B36 Tórshavn (loan)	12	(5)
2019–2021	B36 Tórshavn	46	(16)
2021–2022	HB Tórshavn	22	(5)
2022–2024	B36 Tórshavn	57	(17)
2025–	NSÍ Runavík	49	(17)

International career
2017	Poland U20	1	(0)
- * Club domestic league appearances and goals as of 17:16, 1 November 2026 (UTC)

Michał Damian Przybylski (born 29 December 1997) is a Polish professional footballer who plays as an attacking midfielder for Faroese club NSÍ Runavík.

== Early life ==
Przybylski was born in Świnoujście, Poland, in 1997. He moved to The Faroe Islands at the age of three.

== Club career ==
Przybylski has spent the majority of his career playing in the Faroe Islands Premier League. He made his Faroese league debut with NSÍ Runavík in 2014. Besides the Faroe Islands, he played for Polish side Widzew Łódź. On 5 December 2024, he signed a one-year deal with NSÍ Runavík.

== International career ==
Przybylski has represented Poland internationally at youth level. In 2022, he expressed his desire to represent the Faroe Islands senior team.

== Personal life ==
Przybylski is the son of Polish footballer Tomasz Przybylski.

== Honours ==
Widzew Łódź

- III liga, group I: 2017–18

B36 Tórshavn

- Faroe Islands Cup: 2018

Havnar Bóltfelag

- Faroe Islands Super Cup: 2021

NSÍ Runavík

- Faroe Islands Premier League: 2026
