= Ion Geolgău =

Romanian footballer and manager

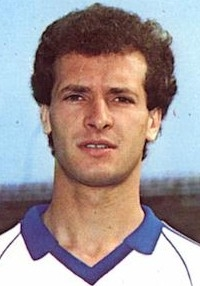

Personal information
- Date of birth: 20 February 1961 (age 65)
- Place of birth: Pielești, Dolj County, Romania
- Height: 1.77 m (5 ft 10 in)
- Position: Midfielder

Youth career
- 1975–1976: Universitatea Craiova

Senior career*
Years	Team	Apps	(Gls)
1976–1989	Universitatea Craiova	293	(33)
1989–1990	Argeș Pitești	11	(1)
1990–1991	Aris Limassol	21	(1)
1991–1992	Avenir Lembeek		
1992–1993	Jiul Craiova		
Total		325	(35)

International career
	Romania U21	20	(2)
1980–1988	Romania (Note: Including one appearance for Romania's Olympic team.)	24	(3)

Managerial career
- 1994: Jiul Petroșani
- 1996–1997: Universitatea Craiova (assistant)
- 1997–2002: HB Tórshavn
- 2002–2003: B36 Tórshavn
- 2004: Fram Reykjavík
- * Club domestic league appearances and goals

Ion Geolgău (born 20 February 1961) is a Romanian former football player and manager. A midfielder, he played 24 times for the Romania national team. At club level, he spent the majority of his club career in CS Universitatea Craiova, where he later served as assistant manager. He also managed teams in the Faroe Islands and Iceland.

== Club career ==
Geolgău was born in Pielești, Dolj County, Romania. On 7 November 1976, being 15 years and 9 months old, he made his Divizia A debut under coach Constantin Teașcă, playing for Universitatea Craiova in a 3–1 victory against UTA Arad. Following his debut, writer Adrian Păunescu penned an article about him titled Visul lui Geolgău (Geolgău's dream). In this article, Păunescu mistakenly referred to Geolgău by the first name Gheorghiță instead of Ion, which subsequently led to Gheorghiță becoming Geolgău's nickname. On 16 March 1977, he scored his first Divizia A goal at the age of 16 in a 5–0 victory against Progresul București. Geolgău went on to play 13 1/2 seasons with Universitatea Craiova, being part of the "Craiova Maxima" generation, helping them win two consecutive league titles in 1980 and 1981. At the first one he contributed with two goals scored in the 24 appearances given to him by coach Valentin Stănescu and in the second he netted three goals in the 29 matches coach Ion Oblemenco used him. He also won the Cupa României four times, in the years 1977, 1978, 1981 and 1983, but played only in the latter final.

Geolgău played 38 games and scored eight goals for "U" Craiova in European competitions. In the first round of the 1979–80 UEFA Cup he scored a goal that helped the team get past Wiener Sport-Club. In the following round he played in both legs of the 4–0 aggregate win over Leeds United, as Universitatea became the first Romanian club that eliminated a team from England in European competitions. Afterwards, they reached the quarter-finals in the 1981–82 European Cup by eliminating Olympiacos and Kjøbenhavns Boldklub, being eliminated with 3–1 on aggregate by Bayern Munich, with Geolgău scoring his side's only goal. He made nine appearances in the 1982–83 UEFA Cup campaign when they reached the semi-finals, scoring two goals against Bordeaux and 1. FC Kaiserslautern, being eliminated by Benfica on the away goal rule after 1–1 on aggregate. Contributing six matches to the 1984–85 UEFA Cup run, he helped "U" navigate past Real Betis and Olympiacos before they ultimately fell to Željezničar in the round of 16. In the first round of the 1985–86 European Cup Winners' Cup, Geolgău netted a double in a 3–0 win over AS Monaco, despite having lost the first leg with 2–0, being eliminated in the following round by Dynamo Kyiv who would win the competition.

In the middle of the 1989–90 season, Geolgău joined Argeș Pitești where he would make his last Divizia A appearance on 5 June 1990 in a 1–0 home win over Universitatea Cluj, totaling 304 matches with 34 goals in the competition. Afterwards he went to play for Aris Limassol, making 21 appearances with one goal scored in his single season spent in the Cypriot First Division. He then spent a year with Belgian side Avenir Lembeek before returning to Romania, where he retired in 1993 after playing for Jiul Craiova in Divizia B.

== International career ==
Geolgău played for Romania in 23 matches, scoring three goals, making his debut on 10 September 1980 when coach Valentin Stănescu sent him in the 60th minute to replace Tudorel Stoica in a friendly that ended with a 2–1 away victory against Bulgaria. He played four games in the Euro 1984 qualifiers, scoring the decisive goal that mathematically qualified Romania to the final tournament in a 1–1 draw against Czechoslovakia at Tehelné pole in Bratislava, earning him the nickname "The hero from Bratislava". After that game, Adrian Păunescu dedicated the following verses to him:"From Pielești to Bratislava / From Craiova to Glasgow / Europe hums / Come on Geolgău, Geolgău, Geolgău!". He also played three matches in the 1986 World Cup qualifiers, scoring one goal in a 3–2 loss to Northern Ireland. His last match for the national team was on 1 June 1988 in a 2–0 away loss in a friendly against the Netherlands. Geolgău also made an appearance for Romania's Olympic team in a 0–0 draw against Italy in the 1984 Summer Olympics qualifiers.

== Managerial career ==
Geolgău started his coaching career in 1994 at Jiul Petroșani and from 1996 until 1997 he was an assistant coach at Universitatea Craiova. In 1997 he went to coach in the Faroe Islands at HB Tórshavn where he spent five years, winning the title and the cup in 1998. In 2002 he moved to B36 Tórshavn where he stayed until 2003 when he won a cup. In 2004 Geolgău had his last coaching experience at Fram Reykjavík in Iceland.

== Personal life ==
Geolgău stated that he was born on 19 February 1961, but his birth date was declared by his father to the People's Council only on 20 February 1961. In 2003, Geolgău received the Honorary Citizen of Craiova title.

== Playing statistics ==
Scores and results list Romania's goal tally first.

#	Date	Venue	Opponent	Score	Result	Competition
1.	30 November 1983	Tehelné pole, Bratislava	Czechoslovakia	1–0	1–1	Euro 1984 qualifier
2.	12 September 1984	Windsor Park, Belfast	Northern Ireland	2–3	2–3	1986 World Cup qualifier
3	30 March 1988	Kurt-Wabbel-Stadion, Halle	East Germany	3–3	3–3	Friendly

== Honours ==
=== Player ===
Universitatea Craiova

- Divizia A: 1979–80, 1980–81
- Cupa României: 1976–77, 1977–78, 1980–81, 1982–83

=== Manager ===
HB Tórshavn

- Faroe Islands League: 1998
- Faroe Islands Cup: 1998

B36 Tórshavn

- Faroe Islands Cup: 2003
