= Rógvi Poulsen =

Faroese footballer

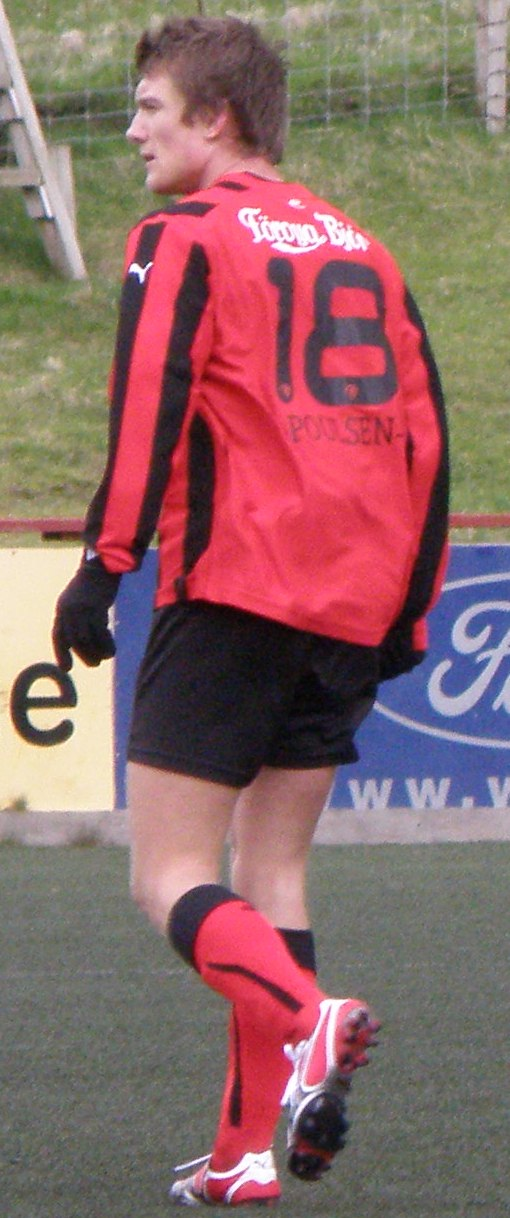

Personal information
- Date of birth: 31 October 1989 (age 36)
- Place of birth: Faroe Islands
- Position: Midfielder

Team information
- Current team: AB Argir

Youth career
- AB Argir
- B36 Tórshavn

Senior career*
Years	Team	Apps	(Gls)
2006–2007	AB Argir	43	(6)
2008–2012	HB Tórshavn	79	(19)
2012–	AB Argir		

International career^{‡}
2005	Faroe Islands U-17	3	(0)
2007	Faroe Islands U-19	3	(0)
2008–2012	Faroe Islands U-21	7	(1)
2009–	Faroe Islands	4	(0)
- * Club domestic league appearances and goals as of 18 October 2012 ‡ National team caps and goals as of 9 September 2011

Rógvi Poulsen is a Faroese footballer who currently plays for AB Argir. He has played four matches for the Faroe Islands national football team.

== Career ==
=== AB Argir ===
He started his playing career at AB Argir and made his first-team debut as a 16-year-old on 18 March 2006 in the cup match against FS Vágar, which AB won 2–1. During the whole season, Poulsen made 20 appearances and scored 4 goals, the first in the 2–3 loss against FS Vágar on 14 May 2006. AB Argir finished second in 1. deild and were promoted to the Formuladeildin. In the 2007 season he made 27 appearances and scored 2 goals in total. AB finished ninth and were relegated back into 1.deild. In October 2012 he signed for AB Argir, he will come back to play with AB Argir after playing five years for HB Tórshavn.

=== HB Tórshavn ===
He signed for HB Tórshavn in 2008 and immediately became a first-team regular. He made his debut on 23 March in the 3–2 defeat to ÍF Fuglafjørður in the Faroe Islands Cup. The 2009 season, he helped HB win the Faroe Islands Super Cup and the league title, playing in 32 matches and scored 10 goals. In the 2010 season he won the Super Cup and league with HB again. In late 2010 he spent time on trial at English club Crewe Alexandra and featured in a 1-0 reserve-team defeat at Liverpool. He then had a second trial at Crewe, who were examining the possibility of signing Poulsen on a short-term contract after impressing during a second trial. But complications with international clearance and other red tape prevented the move. Poulsen returned to HB in April 2011.

== International career ==
He has represented his country at Under-17, U-19, and U-21 level, as well as capped at full international level for the Faroe Islands. He scored for the under-21 team in September 2009, in a European Under-21 Championship Qualifying match against Latvia with strike from long-range. He debuted for the senior team on 4 June 2010, in a friendly match against Luxembourg.
