= Hanus Sørensen =

Faroese footballer (born 2001)

Personal information
- Date of birth: 19 February 2001 (age 25)
- Place of birth: Tórshavn, Faroe Islands
- Height: 1.82 m (6 ft 0 in)
- Position: Defender

Team information
- Current team: NK Aluminij (on loan from Celje)

Youth career
- –2016: HB
- 2017–2020: FC Midtjylland

Senior career*
Years	Team	Apps	(Gls)
2021–2022	Middelfart	24	(1)
2022	→ HB (loan)	8	(0)
2022–2025	HB	60	(5)
2025–	Celje	12	(0)
2025–2026	→ Triglav Kranj (loan)	20	(4)
2026–	→ NK Aluminij (Loan)	13	(1)

International career^{‡}
2016–2017	Faroe Islands U17	22	(3)
2017–2019	Faroe Islands U19	10	(0)
2020–2022	Faroe Islands U21	10	(0)
2022–	Faroe Islands	34	(5)
- * Club domestic league appearances and goals as of 12 November 2026 ‡ National team caps and goals as of 16 November 2026

Hanus Sørensen (born 19 February 2001) is a Faroese professional footballer who plays as a defender for Slovenian club NK Aluminij, on loan from Celje.

== Club career ==
As a youth player, Sørensen joined the youth academy of Faroese side HB. In 2017, he joined the youth academy of Danish side FC Midtjylland. Ahead of the second half of the 2020–21 season, he signed for Danish side Middelfart, before he returned to his old club HB on loan. The same year, he signed permanently for the club, where he made his breakthrough into a Faroese international. Two years later, he signed for Slovenian side Celje and joined them in early 2025. He is currently playing on loan at NK Aluminij.

== International career ==
Sørensen has represented the Faroe Islands internationally at under-17, under-19, under-21, and senior level. Altogether, he made forty-two appearances for the under-17, and under-19, and under-21 teams combined, and helped the under-17's achieve qualification for the 2017 UEFA European Under-17 Championship. He made his debut for the national team on November 16, 2022, starting as a right-back in a 5–0 loss to Czechia, and scored his first goal in a 1–1 draw with Latvia during the 2024–25 UEFA Nations League C.

== Style of play ==
Sørensen can play as a defender or midfielder and is right-footed. While playing for Faroese side HB during the 2024 season, he mainly played as a midfielder. In addition, he is known for his speed.

== Personal life ==
His cousin, Heini Sørensen, is also a footballer, and currently plays for Havnar Bóltfelag. They were briefly teammates in Midtjylland's youth system.

== Career statistics ==
=== International ===
As of match played 16 November 2026

Appearances and goals by national team and year
National team	Year	Apps	Goals
Faroe Islands
Faroe Islands	2022	1	0
Faroe Islands	2023	4	0
Faroe Islands	2024	10	1
Faroe Islands	2025	10	3
Faroe Islands	2026	9	1
Total		34	5

Scores and results list Faroe Islands' goal tally first, score column indicates score after each Sørensen goal.

List of international goals scored by Hanus Sørensen
No.	Date	Venue	Opponent	Score	Result	Competition
1	13 October 2024	Tórsvøllur, Tórshavn, Faroe Islands	Latvia	1–0	1–1	2024–25 UEFA Nations League
2	9 October 2025	Tórsvøllur, Tórshavn, Faroe Islands	Montenegro	1–0	4–0	2026 FIFA World Cup qualification
3	9 October 2025	Tórsvøllur, Tórshavn, Faroe Islands	Montenegro	3–0	4–0	2026 FIFA World Cup qualification
4	12 October 2025	Tórsvøllur, Tórshavn, Faroe Islands	Czech Republic	1–0	2–1	2026 FIFA World Cup qualification
5	9 June 2026	LNK Sporta Parks, Riga, Latvia	Latvia	1–0	1–0	2026 Baltic Cup
