= 2023 Faroe Islands Cup =

Løgmanssteypið

Tournament details
- Country: Faroe Islands
- Teams: 16

Final positions
- Champions: Havnar Bóltfelag (29th title)
- Runners-up: B68 Toftir

Tournament statistics
- Matches played: 16
- Goals scored: 58 (3.63 per match)
- Top goal scorer(s): Jógvan Højgaard; Steffan Løkin (3 goals)

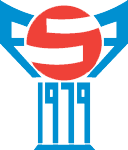
The logo of the Faroe Islands Football Association and the national football team.

The 2023 Faroe Islands Cup was the 69th edition of the Faroe Islands domestic football cup. It started on 21 April 2023 and ended on 4 November 2023. Only the first teams of the participating clubs were allowed to enter the competition.

Havnar Bóltfelag won the cup (their twenty-ninth Faroe Islands Cup win) on 4 November 2023 with a 5–3 penalty shootout win over B68 Toftir after a 0–0 draw, qualifying for the 2024–25 Conference League second qualifying round.

== First round ==
Team 1	Score	Team 2
21 April 2023
AB Argir	1–0	Suðuroy
B36 Tórshavn	2–0	KÍ
Hoyvík	0–6	EB/Streymur
ÍF	0–2	07 Vestur
NSÍ Runavík	14–0	MB
Skála	3–1	B71 Sandoy
TB Tvøroyri	0–1	B68 Toftir
Víkingur Gøta	1–2 (a.e.t.)	Havnar Bóltfelag

== Quarter-finals ==
Team 1	Score	Team 2
10 May 2023
AB Argir	1–2	07 Vestur
B36 Tórshavn	0–2	Havnar Bóltfelag
B68 Toftir	2–1	NSÍ Runavík
EB/Streymur	4–1	Skála

== Semi-finals ==
Team 1	Agg.	Team 2	1st leg	2nd leg
28 June 2023 (1st leg) 4 October 2023 (2nd leg)
07 Vestur	2–3	Havnar Bóltfelag	1–1	1–2
28 June 2023 (1st leg) 25 October 2023 (2nd leg)
EB/Streymur	1–5	B68 Toftir	0–3	1–2

== Final ==
4 November 2023
17:00

B68 Toftir	0–0 (a.e.t.)	Havnar Bóltfelag
Penalties
Lau (penalty missed); Nielsen (penalty scored); Strømsten (penalty scored); Mellemgaard (penalty scored)	3–5	(penalty scored) Justinussen; (penalty scored) Davidsen; (penalty scored) Jónsson; (penalty scored) Mohr; (penalty scored) Sørensen

Tórsvøllur, Tórshavn
Attendance: 6,500
Referee: Kári á Høvdanum

== Bracket ==
First round
AB Argir	1
Suðuroy	0
ÍF	0
07 Vestur	2
B36 Tórshavn	2
KÍ	0
Víkingur Gøta	1
Havnar Bóltfelag (a.e.t.)	2
Hoyvík	0
EB/Streymur	6
Skála	3
B71 Sandoy	1
TB Tvøroyri	0
B68 Toftir	1
NSÍ Runavík	14
MB	0

Quarter-finals
AB Argir	1
07 Vestur	2
B36 Tórshavn	0
Havnar Bóltfelag	2
EB/Streymur	4
Skála	1
B68 Toftir	2
NSÍ Runavík	1

Semi-finals
07 Vestur	1	1	2
Havnar Bóltfelag	1	2	3
EB/Streymur	0	1	1
B68 Toftir	3	2	5

Final
B68 Toftir	0 (3)
Havnar Bóltfelag	0 (5)
