= Heri Mohr =

Faroese footballer (born 1997)

Personal information
- Full name: Heri Hjalt Mohr
- Date of birth: 13 May 1997 (age 29)
- Position: Defender

Team information
- Current team: HB
- Number: 15

Senior career*
Years	Team	Apps	(Gls)
2013–2016	HB	5	(0)
2016	TB	9	(0)
2017–2019	HB	20	(1)
2019–2020	AB	27	(3)
2020–2023	HB	72	(0)
2024	Strømmen	18	(0)
2025	IF Føroyar		
2026–	HB	15	(0)

International career^{‡}
2013	Faroe Islands U-17	5	(0)
2021–	Faroe Islands	4	(0)
- * Club domestic league appearances and goals as of 1 November 2026 ‡ National team caps and goals as of 17 April 2023

Heri Hjalt Mohr (born 13 May 1997) is a Faroese football player. He plays for HB.

== International career ==
He was first called up to the Faroe Islands national football team in September 2020, but did not play.

He made his debut on 1 September 2021 in a World Cup qualifier against Israel, a 0–4 home loss. He substituted Gunnar Vatnhamar in the 76th minute.

== Career statistics ==
=== Club ===
As of matches played on 29 September 2024.

Club	Season	League			National Cup (Note: Includes Faroe Islands Cup, Norwegian Cup)		Continental		Other		Total	
Club	Season	Division	Apps	Goals	Apps	Goals	Apps	Goals	Apps	Goals	Apps	Goals
HB	2013	Faroe Islands Premier League	1	0	0	0	0	0	—		1	0
HB	2014	Faroe Islands Premier League	1	0	0	0	0	0	0	0	1	0
HB	2015	Faroe Islands Premier League	3	0	0	0	0	0	—		3	0
HB	2016	Faroe Islands Premier League	0	0	1	0	0	0	—		1	0
HB	Total		5	0	1	0	0	0	0	0	6	0
TB	2016	Faroe Islands Premier League	9	0	0	0	—		—		9	0
HB	2017	Faroe Islands Premier League	19	1	1	0	0	0	—		20	1
HB	2018	Faroe Islands Premier League	1	0	1	0	—		—		2	0
HB	Total		20	1	2	0	0	0	0	0	22	1
AB	2019	Faroe Islands Premier League	27	3	1	0	—		—		28	3
HB	2020	Faroe Islands Premier League	19	0	3	0	0	0	0	0	22	0
HB	2021	Faroe Islands Premier League	22	0	4	0	4 (Note: Appearance(s) in UEFA Europa Conference League)	1	1 (Note: Appearance(s) in Faroe Islands Super Cup)	0	31	1
HB	2022	Faroe Islands Premier League	16	0	3	0	0	0	—		19	0
HB	2023	Faroe Islands Premier League	15	0	2	0	1	0	—		18	0
HB	Total		72	0	12	0	5	1	1	0	90	1
Strømmen	2024	2. divisjon	16	0	0	0	—		—		16	0
Career total			149	4	16	0	5	1	1	0	171	5

=== International ===
As of match played 29 March 2022

Appearances and goals by national team and year
National team	Year	Apps	Goals
Faroe Islands	2021	3	0
Faroe Islands	2022	1	0
Total		4	0
