= Vatnhamar =

Vatnhamar is a surname. Notable people with the surname include:

- Gunnar Vatnhamar (born 1995), Faroese footballer
- Sølvi Vatnhamar (born 1986), Faroese footballer
