= Heini Sørensen =

Faroese footballer (born 2004)

Personal information
- Full name: Heini Fossdalsá Sørensen
- Date of birth: 27 January 2004 (age 22)
- Place of birth: Tórshavn, Faroe Islands, Denmark
- Height: 1.75 m (5 ft 9 in)
- Position: Midfielder

Team information
- Current team: HB
- Number: 9

Youth career
- HB
- 2018–2023: Midtjylland

Senior career*
Years	Team	Apps	(Gls)
2023-2025	Thisted FC	31	(2)
2025-	HB	49	(14)

International career^{‡}
2017–2018	Faroe Islands U15	3	(2)
2019	Faroe Islands U17	12	(3)
2021–2022	Faroe Islands U19	10	(2)
2021–	Faroe Islands U21	12	(0)
- * Club domestic league appearances and goals as of 1 November 2026 ‡ National team caps and goals as of 7 June 2022

Heini Sørensen (born 27 January 2004) is a Faroese professional footballer who plays for Faroe Islands Premier League team Havnar Bóltfelag.

== Club career ==
Sørensen was born and brought up in the Faroe Islands where he played youth football with the local club HB. At the age of 14, in 2018, he left HB and joined the Danish club Midtjylland after being recommended by scout, Julian Hansen. On the day of his birthday, he signed a three-year contract with the club in 2019. While playing at the youth levels of Danish football, he caught the attention of the Dutch club AFC Ajax and had been offered to occasionally train with their youth team. Heini left Midtjylland in 2023 and joined Danish 2nd Division team Thisted FC. He returned to the Faroe Islands in 2025, signing for his old club HB.

== International career ==
Sørensen has represented the Faroe Islands through youth level. He captained the under-15 and under-19 squad.

== Style of play ==
Sørensen was described by, former Faroese national team player and talent scout of Midtjylland, Julian Hansen as "possibly the greatest Faroese talent of all time. He is quick, hard-working and very good on the ball." Hansen also compared his physicality to retired Dutch player Wesley Sneijder.

== Personal life ==
Sørensen has a cousin, Hanus, who is a footballer for NK Celje in Slovenia, a club he joined 1. January 2025, after a successful spell in HB Tórshavn. Hanus also played for Midtjylland as a youth.
