= Magnus Egilsson =

Faroese footballer (born 1994)

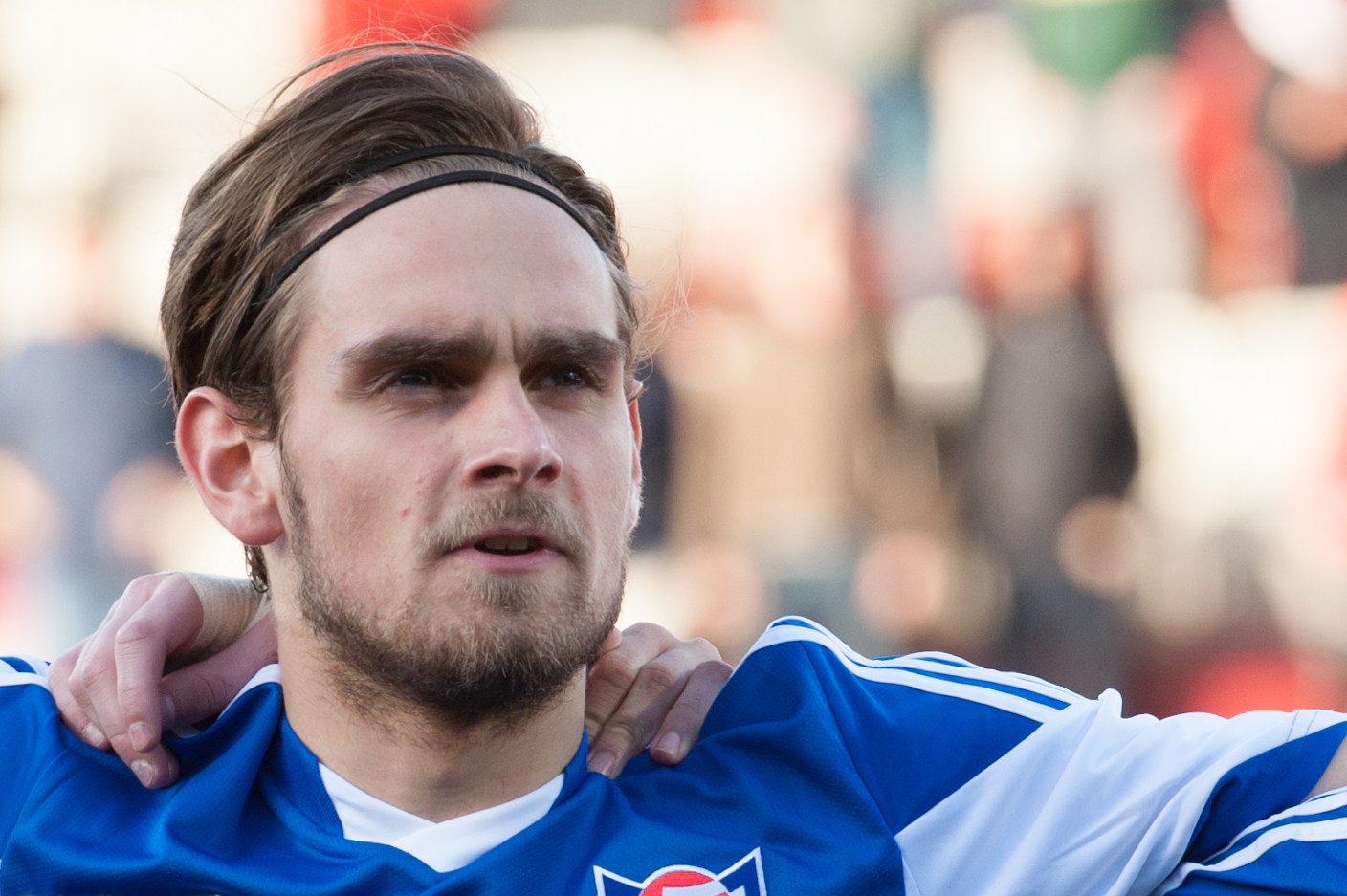

Personal information
- Full name: Magnus Egilsson
- Date of birth: 19 March 1994 (age 32)
- Place of birth: Tórshavn, Faroe Islands
- Position: Left-back

Team information
- Current team: B36 Tórshavn
- Number: 16

Senior career*
Years	Team	Apps	(Gls)
2011–2013	HB	7	(0)
2011–2013	HB II	71	(5)
2014–2015	AB	41	(2)
2014–2015	AB II	14	(4)
2016–2020	HB	65	(3)
2017	HB II	2	(0)
2020–2021	Valur	7	(0)
2022–	B36 Tórshavn	71	(6)

International career^{‡}
2009–2010	Faroe Islands U17	5	(0)
2011	Faroe Islands U19	2	(0)
2015–2016	Faroe Islands U21	6	(0)
2019–	Faroe Islands	3	(0)
- * Club domestic league appearances and goals as of 27 October 2024 ‡ National team caps and goals as of 11:00, 1 April 2024 (UTC)

Magnus Egilsson (born 19 March 1994) is a Faroese footballer who plays as a left-back for B36 Tórshavn and the Faroe Islands national team.

== Career ==
Egilsson made his international debut for the Faroe Islands on 8 September 2019 in a UEFA Euro 2020 qualifying match against Spain, which finished as a 0–4 away loss.

== Career statistics ==
=== International ===
As of 1 April 2024

Faroe Islands
Year	Apps	Goals
2019	2	0
2024	1	0
Total	3	0

== Personal life ==
Egilsson works as a Builder while also playing football.
