= Noah Mneney =

Faroese footballer (born 2002)

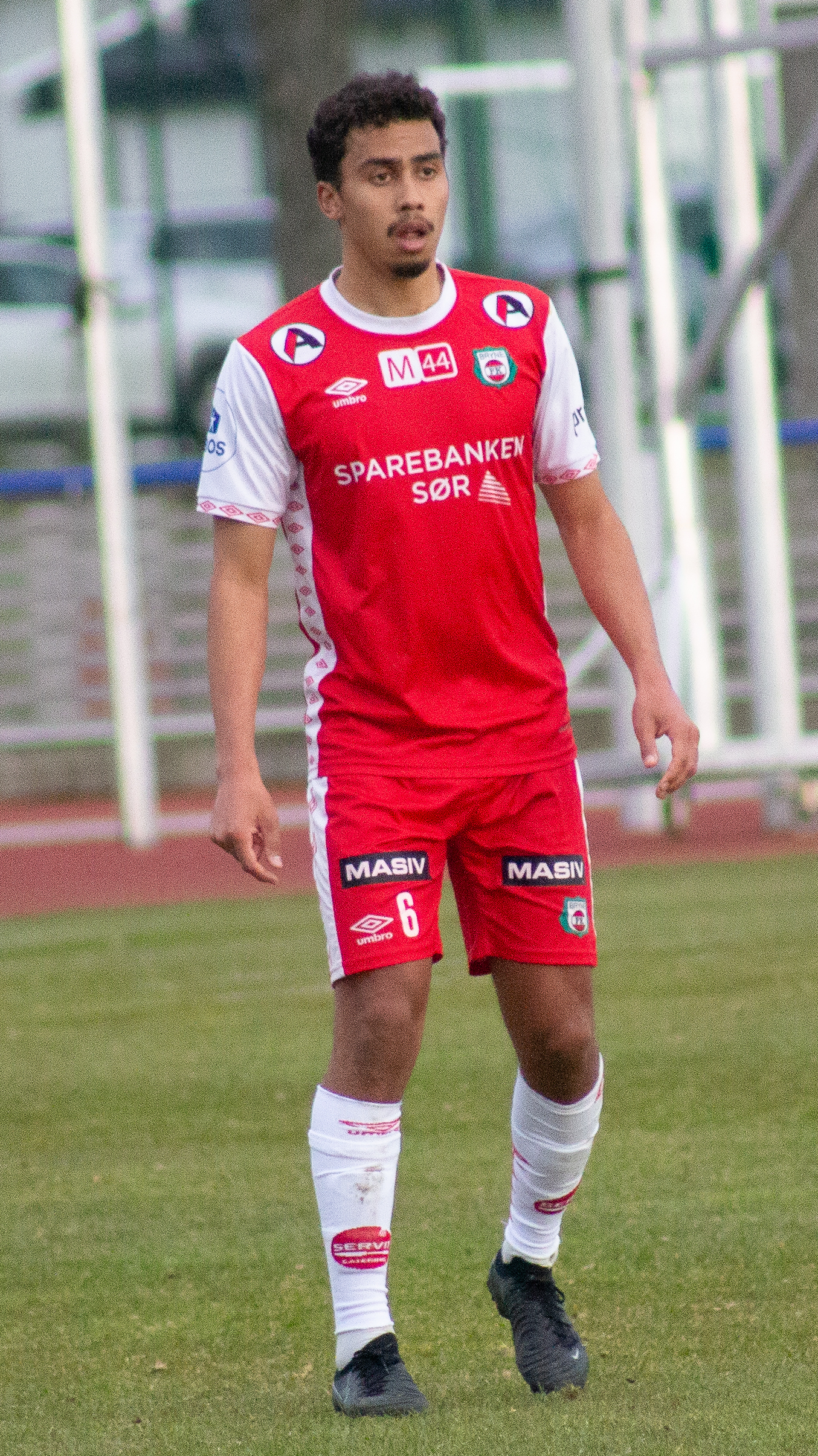
- Noah Hans Mneney

Personal information
- Full name: Noah Hans Mneney
- Date of birth: 6 December 2002 (age 23)
- Place of birth: Faroe Islands
- Height: 1.79 m (5 ft 10 in)
- Position: Midfielder

Team information
- Current team: HB
- Number: 5

Youth career
- –2018: ÍF

Senior career*
Years	Team	Apps	(Gls)
2019–2022	Víkingur	73	(4)
2023–2024	Bryne	26	(1)
2024	→ HB (loan)	13	(2)
2025–	HB	42	(3)

International career^{‡}
2018	Faroe Islands U17	7	(0)
2019	Faroe Islands U19	5	(0)
2020–2024	Faroe Islands U21	17	(1)
2022–	Faroe Islands	9	(0)
- * Club domestic league appearances and goals as of 1 November 2026 ‡ National team caps and goals as of 18:00, 13 October 2025

Noah Hans Mneney (born 6 December 2002) is a Faroese professional footballer who plays as a midfielder for HB.

== Club career ==
As a youth player, Mneney joined the youth academy of Faroese side ÍF. Ahead of the 2019 season, he signed for Faroese side Víkingur, where he made seventy-three league appearances and scored four goals and helped them win the 2022 Faroe Islands Cup.

In 2023, he signed for Norwegian side Bryne, where he made twenty-six league appearances and scored one goal and helped them achieve promotion from the second tier to the top flight. Faroese news website wrote in that he "struggled from the start to get playing time and in 2023 his role was mostly to be a substitute" while playing for them. Subsequently, he signed for Faroese side HB in 2024, helping the club win the 2024 Faroe Islands Cup.

== International career ==
Mneney is a Faroe Islands international, but was also eligible to represent Tanzania. During the summer of 2022, he was first called up to the Faroe Islands national football team for 2022–23 UEFA Nations League.

== Personal life ==
Noah Mneney finished an apprenticeship as a mechanical engineer.
