= 1995 Faroe Islands Cup =

Tournament details
- Country: Faroe Islands
- Teams: 21

Final positions
- Champions: HB Tórshavn
- Runners-up: B68 Toftir

Tournament statistics
- Matches played: 61
- Goals scored: 297 (4.87 per match)
- Top goal scorer: Uni Arge (15 goals)

The 1995 Faroe Islands Cup was played between 19 March and 16 August 1995. The cup was won by HB Torshavn.

== Preliminary round ==
The matches were played on 19 and 23 March 1995.

Team 1	Score	Team 2
SÍ Sørvágur	w/o	Skála ÍF
AB	3–4	Æsir Vestmanna

== First round ==
The matches were played on 26 March and 12 April 1995.

Team 1	Score	Team 2
Skansin Tórshavn	3–2	Æsir Vestmanna
Fram	2–0 (a.e.t.)	KB Tórshavn
Royn Hvalba	1–3	SÍ Sørvágur

== Second round ==
The second round (group stage) was played between 13 March and 7 May 1995.

=== Group 1 ===
Pos	Team	Pld	W	D	L	GF	GA	GD	Pts	Qualification	NSÍ	B71	ÍF	FRA
1	NSÍ Runavík	6	5	1	0	25	3	+22	16	Advanced to quarter-finals		1–0	5–2	10–0
2	B71 Sandoy	6	2	3	1	14	6	+8	9	Advanced to quarter-finals	1–1		2–2	6–0
3	ÍF Fuglafjørður	6	1	2	3	14	14	0	5		0–2	2–2		7–0
4	Fram Tórshavn	6	1	0	5	3	33	−30	3		0–6	0–3	3–1	

=== Group 2 ===
Pos	Team	Pld	W	D	L	GF	GA	GD	Pts	Qualification	HB	SVB	B36	ST
1	HB Tórshavn	6	4	1	1	39	5	+34	13	Advanced to quarter-finals		2–4	1–0	22–0
2	Sumba/VB	6	4	1	1	29	7	+22	13	Advanced to quarter-finals	1–1		4–1	12–0
3	B36 Tórshavn	6	3	0	3	24	11	+13	9		0–4	3–2		7–0
4	Skansin Tórshavn	6	0	0	6	0	69	−69	0		0–9	0–6	0–13	

=== Group 3 ===
Pos	Team	Pld	W	D	L	GF	GA	GD	Pts	Qualification	GÍ	B68	EBS	LÍF
1	GÍ Gøta	6	6	0	0	19	6	+13	18	Advanced to quarter-finals		3–0	5–2	6–2
2	B68 Toftir	6	4	0	2	14	8	+6	12	Advanced to quarter-finals	1–2		2–0	4–1
3	EB/Streymur	6	0	2	4	5	13	−8	2		0–1	0–2		1–1
4	Leirvík ÍF	6	0	2	4	9	20	−11	2		1–2	2–5	2–2	

=== Group 4 ===
Pos	Team	Pld	W	D	L	GF	GA	GD	Pts	Qualification	KÍ	TB	FSV	SÍ
1	KÍ Klaksvík	6	4	2	0	18	8	+10	14	Advanced to quarter-finals		2–2	6–0	4–2
2	TB Tvøroyri	6	3	2	1	16	9	+7	11	Advanced to quarter-finals	1–1		3–1	6–0
3	FS Vágar	6	3	0	3	15	13	+2	9		0–1	3–1		5–1
4	SÍ Sørvágur	6	0	0	6	9	28	−19	0		3–4	2–3	1–6	

== Quarter-finals ==
The matches were played on 12 May 1995.

Team 1	Score	Team 2
TB	1–0	GÍ
KÍ	2–1	Sumba/VB
B71	1–2	HB
B68	3–2 (a.e.t.)	NSÍ

== Semi-finals ==
The first legs were played on 21 June and the second legs on 28 June 1995.

Team 1	Agg.	Team 2	1st leg	2nd leg
TB	2–5	HB	2–1	0–4
KÍ	2–3	B68	0–3	2–0

== Final ==
16 August 1995

B68	1–3	HB
Højgaard 78'		Nolsøe 23'; Hansen 43'; Samuelsen 77'

Gundadalur, Tórshavn
Referee: Petur Erhard Kjærbo
