= Andrias Eriksen =

Faroese footballer (born 1994)

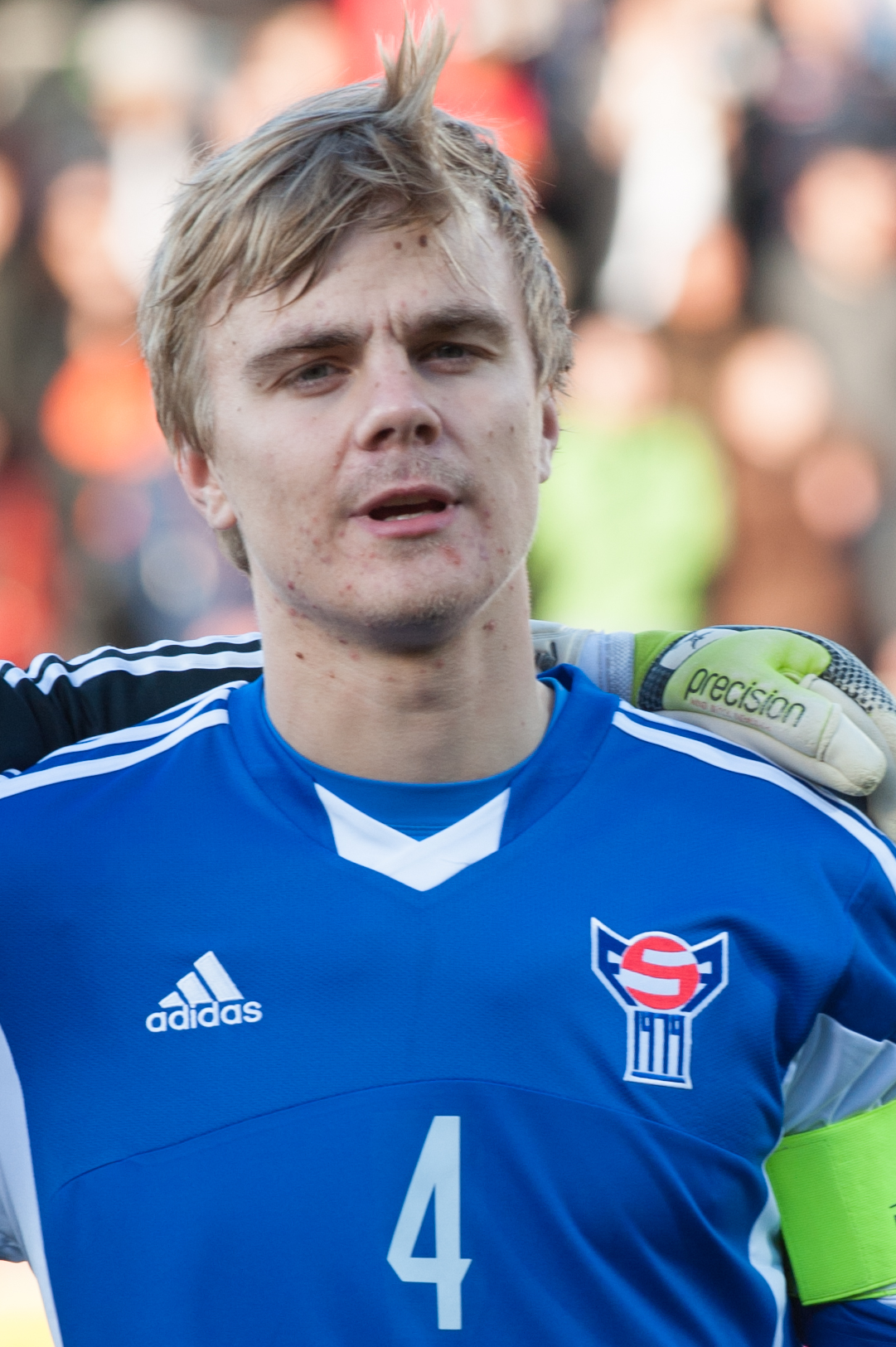

Personal information
- Full name: Andrias Høgnason Eriksen
- Date of birth: 22 February 1994 (age 32)
- Place of birth: Hoyvík, Faroe Islands
- Position: Defender

Team information
- Current team: B36 Tórshavn
- Number: 2

Youth career
- 2012–2013: Varde

Senior career*
Years	Team	Apps	(Gls)
2013–2024	B36 Tórshavn II	21	(0)
2014–2024	B36 Tórshavn	255	(3)

International career^{‡}
2012	Faroe Islands U19	2	(0)
2015–2016	Faroe Islands U21	9	(0)
2019	Faroe Islands	2	(0)
- * Club domestic league appearances and goals as of 25 July 2024 ‡ National team caps and goals as of 10:15, 7 Oct 2020 (UTC)

Andrias Høgnason Eriksen (born 22 February 1994) is a Faroese retired footballer who played as a defender for B36 Tórshavn and the Faroe Islands national team.

== Career ==
Eriksen made his international debut for Faroe Islands on 8 September 2019 in a UEFA Euro 2020 qualifying match against Spain, which finished as a 0–4 away loss. In June 2024 Andrias Eriksen retired from football because of cronical injuries.

== Career statistics ==
=== International ===
As of 8 September 2019

Faroe Islands
Year	Apps	Goals
2019	2	0
Total	2	0

== Honours ==
B36 Tórshavn

- Faroe Islands Premier League: 2014, 2015
- Faroe Islands Cup: 2018
