= Jóannes Jakobsen =

Faroese footballer, musician, and composer

Personal information
- Date of birth: 25 August 1961 (age 65)
- Place of birth: Tórshavn, Faroe Islands
- Position: Defender

Senior career*
Years	Team	Apps	(Gls)
1977–1990	HB Tórshavn	141	(?)
1991	VB Vágur	17	(0)
1992	VB Vágur	16	(1)
1993–1995	HB	37	(1)
1996–1997	KÍ Klaksvík	11	(0)
2000	B68 Toftir	1	(0)

International career
1989–1993	Faroe Islands	25	(0)

Managerial career
- 1994–1995: HB Tórshavn
- 1996–1998: KÍ Klaksvík
- 2000–2001: B68 Toftir
- 2002: HB
- 2004: B36 Tórshavn
- 2005: AB Argir
- 2006: B68
- * Club domestic league appearances and goals

Jóannes Jakobsen (born 25 August 1961) is a former Faroese football defender, as well as musician and composer, having released three albums on the Faroe Islands and produced a number of albums for other artists. He is the former assistant coach of Faroe Islands. He is currently head youth manager for the Faroese team B36.

== Club career ==
He played over 20 years with Faroese top team, HB Tórshavn, where he also became player/coach in 1994. He was also player and manager of several other Faroese clubs.

== International career ==
Jakobsen made his debut for the Faroe Islands in an April 1989 friendly match against Canada, immediately skippering them to their first ever win since joining FIFA. He remained captain of the team during those first years, most notably during their historic victory over Austria in 1990. His final international match was a September 1993 World Cup qualifying match against Romania. He has collected 25 caps, though never scoring any goals.

== Career in music ==
=== Albums ===
- Hvat bagir, 1990
- Royn tínar veingir, 1995
- Myrkursins gongumenn, 1998

=== Appears on ===
- Vit herja á, 1990
- Reytt og svart, 1993
- Sangur til frælsi, 2000
- Hetta er eisini mítt land, M'as Blues Band, 2001
- Hetta er eisini mítt land II, M'as Blues Band, 2003
- Kyndil 50 ár, 2006

=== Compilation ===
- Tólvti maður, 1998
- Alt, Kim Hansen, 2005
