= 1999 Faroe Islands Cup =

Tournament details
- Country: Faroe Islands
- Teams: 17

Final positions
- Champions: KÍ Klaksvík
- Runners-up: B36 Tórshavn

Tournament statistics
- Matches played: 47
- Goals scored: 187 (3.98 per match)
- Top goal scorer: Kurt Mørkøre (9 goals)

The 1999 Faroe Islands Cup was played between 14 March and 4 July 1999. The cup was won by KÍ Klaksvík.

== Preliminary round ==
The matches were played on 14 March 1999.

Team 1	Score	Team 2
EB/Streymur	4–1	AB
Royn Hvalba	5–1	Skála ÍF

== First round ==
The matches were played on 21 March 1999.

Team 1	Score	Team 2
B71	w/o	Royn Hvalba
TB	4–1 (a.e.t.)	FS Vágar
LÍF	1–0	EB/Streymur

== Second round ==
The second round (group stage) was played between 27 March and 20 April 1999.

=== Group 1 ===
Pos	Team	Pld	W	D	L	GF	GA	GD	Pts	Qualification	HB	GÍ	ÍF	B71
1	HB Torshavn	6	6	0	0	16	3	+13	18	Advanced to quarter-finals		1–0	3–0	2–0
2	GÍ Gøta	6	4	0	2	19	7	+12	12	Advanced to quarter-finals	2–4		5–2	4–0
3	ÍF Fuglafjørður	6	2	0	4	10	20	−10	6	Advanced to quarter-finals	0–4	0–4		4–2
4	B71 Sandoy	6	0	0	6	5	20	−15	0		1–2	0–4	2–4	

=== Group 2 ===
Pos	Team	Pld	W	D	L	GF	GA	GD	Pts	Qualification	KÍ	VB	B68	TB
1	KÍ Klaksvík	6	5	0	1	11	4	+7	15	Advanced to quarter-finals		2–3	5–0	awd
2	VB Vágur	6	4	0	2	13	4	+9	12	Advanced to quarter-finals	0–1		5–1	3–0
3	B68 Toftir	6	3	0	3	6	14	−8	9	Advanced to quarter-finals	0–1	awd		1–0
4	TB Tvøroyri	6	0	0	6	4	12	−8	0		1–2	0–2	3–4	

=== Group 3 ===
Pos	Team	Pld	W	D	L	GF	GA	GD	Pts	Qualification	B36	NSÍ	SÍ	LÍF
1	B36 Tórshavn	6	5	0	1	20	6	+14	15	Advanced to quarter-finals		2–1	6–2	7–0
2	NSÍ Runavík	6	5	0	1	22	10	+12	15	Advanced to quarter-finals	3–1		6–3	4–3
3	SÍ Sumba	6	1	0	5	7	19	−12	3		0–2	1–2		1–0
4	Leirvík ÍF	6	1	0	5	6	20	−14	3		0–2	0–6	3–0	

== Quarter-finals ==
The matches were played on 2 May 1999.

Team 1	Score	Team 2
B36	2–1	NSÍ
VB	3–1	B68
HB	10–0	ÍF
KÍ	4–0	GÍ

== Semi-finals ==
The first legs were played on 13 May and the second legs on 24 May 2000.

Team 1	Agg.	Team 2	1st leg	2nd leg
B36	4–2	VB	3–1	1–1
HB	2–2 (a)	KÍ	0–1	2–1

== Final ==
4 July 1999

KÍ	3–1	B36
Jacobsen 24'; Mørkøre 50'; Joensen 64'		J.K. Hansen 81'

Gundadalur, Tórshavn
Referee: Oddmar Andreasen
