= 2003 Faroe Islands Cup =

Tournament details
- Country: Faroe Islands
- Teams: 18

Final positions
- Champions: B36 Tórshavn
- Runners-up: GÍ Gøta

Tournament statistics
- Matches played: 51
- Goals scored: 197 (3.86 per match)
- Top goal scorer: Jákup á Borg (9 goals)

The 2003 Faroe Islands Cup was played between 9 March and 29 July 2003. The cup was won by B36 Tórshavn.

== Preliminary round ==
The matches were played on 9 March 2003.

Team 1	Score	Team 2
B71	1–1 (a.e.t.); 3–4 (p)	SÍ Sumba
ÍF	0–0 (a.e.t.); 6–7 (p)	AB
LÍF	1–2	Royn Hvalba
TB	8–0	Fram

== First round ==
The matches were played on 15 and 16 March 2003.

Team 1	Score	Team 2
TB	3–0	Royn Hvalba
SÍ Sumba	2–3	AB

== Second round ==
The second round (group stage) was played between 22 March and 21 April 2003.

=== Group 1 ===
Pos	Team	Pld	W	D	L	GF	GA	GD	Pts	Qualification	NSÍ	B68	FS	TB
1	NSÍ Runavík	6	4	0	2	17	6	+11	12	Advanced to quarter-finals		3–0	4–2	5–0
2	B68 Toftir	6	3	2	1	13	8	+5	11	Advanced to quarter-finals	2–1		3–2	6–0
3	FS Vágar	6	3	1	2	17	8	+9	10	Advanced to quarter-finals	2–1	0–0		6–0
4	TB Tvøroyri	6	0	1	5	2	27	−25	1		0–3	2–2	0–5	

=== Group 2 ===
Pos	Team	Pld	W	D	L	GF	GA	GD	Pts	Qualification	EBS	KÍ	VB	AB
1	EB/Streymur	6	4	2	0	18	5	+13	14	Advanced to quarter-finals		3–1	1–1	7–1
2	KÍ Klaksvík	6	3	1	2	11	8	+3	10	Advanced to quarter-finals	0–4		2–0	4–0
3	VB Vágur	6	2	3	1	9	7	+2	9		2–2	1–1		3–0
4	AB Argir	6	0	0	6	2	20	−18	0		0–1	0–3	1–2	

=== Group 3 ===
Pos	Team	Pld	W	D	L	GF	GA	GD	Pts	Qualification	GÍ	HB	B36	SKÁ
1	GÍ Gøta	6	5	0	1	14	8	+6	15	Advanced to quarter-finals		2–1	2–0	4–1
2	HB Tórshavn	6	3	1	2	15	6	+9	10	Advanced to quarter-finals	0–1		2–0	7–1
3	B36 Tórshavn	6	3	1	2	11	8	+3	10	Advanced to quarter-finals	5–1	1–1		2–1
4	Skála ÍF	6	0	0	6	6	24	−18	0		1–4	1–4	1–3	

== Quarter-finals ==
The matches were played on 3, 4 and 7 May 2003.

Team 1	Score	Team 2
B68	5–5 (a.e.t.); 3–4 (p)	KÍ
GÍ	0–0 (a.e.t.); 6–5 (p)	FS
NSÍ	3–1	HB
EB/Streymur	1–2	B36

== Semi-finals ==
The first legs were played on 11 May and the second legs on 18 May 2003.

Team 1	Agg.	Team 2	1st leg	2nd leg
B36	11–2	KÍ	4–1	7–1
NSÍ	3–4	GÍ	1–1	2–3

== Final ==
29 July 2003

B36	3–1 (a.e.t.)	GÍ
Hansen 51'; Petersen 105'; Borg 117' (pen.)		Olsen 35'

Tórsvøllur, Tórshavn
Referee: Lassin Isaksen
