= 2022 Faroe Islands Cup =

Løgmanssteypið

Tournament details
- Country: Faroe Islands
- Teams: 18

Final positions
- Champions: Víkingur Gøta (6th title)
- Runners-up: KÍ

Tournament statistics
- Matches played: 19
- Goals scored: 81 (4.26 per match)
- Top goal scorer(s): Páll Klettskarð; Sølvi Vatnhamar (5 goals)

The 2022 Faroe Islands Cup was the 68th edition of the Faroe Islands domestic football cup. It started on 2 April and is ended on 29 October. B36 Tórshavn were the defending champions.

Only the first teams of the participating clubs were allowed to enter the competition.

== Preliminary round ==
The matches took place on 2 and 3 April 2022.

Team 1	Score	Team 2
FC Hoyvík	8–0	MB
FC Suðuroy	5–0	Royn Hvalba

== First round ==
The matches took place on 14 April 2022.

Team 1	Score	Team 2
AB	4–2 (a.e.t.)	B68 Toftir
ÍF	4–0	B71 Sandoy
HB	9–1	FC Suðuroy
EB/Streymur	2–4 (a.e.t.)	07 Vestur
TB	4–0	FC Hoyvík
Víkingur Gøta	4–0	Undrið
Skála	0–3	KÍ
NSÍ Runavík	1–4	B36

== Quarter-finals ==
The matches took place on 18 May 2022.

Team 1	Score	Team 2
HB	2–1	AB
KÍ	3–0	ÍF
TB	1–4	07 Vestur
B36	0–2	Víkingur Gøta

== Semi-finals ==
The ties were played over two legs on 7 September and 5 October 2022.

Team 1	Agg.	Team 2	1st leg	2nd leg
07 Vestur	2–6	KÍ	2–2	0–4
Víkingur Gøta	3–2	HB	2–2	1–0

== Final ==
29 October 2022
19:00

KÍ	0–1	Víkingur Gøta
	Report	Vatnhamar 87' (pen.)

Tórsvøllur, Torshavn
Attendance: 4,175
Referee: Dagfinn Forná
