= Páll Mohr Joensen =

Faroese footballer

Páll Joensen
Personal information
- Full name: Páll Mohr Joensen
- Date of birth: 29 June 1986 (age 40)
- Place of birth: Faroe Islands
- Height: 1.80 m (5 ft 11 in)
- Position: Forward

Team information
- Current team: HB Tórshavn
- Number: 24

Youth career
- HB Tórshavn

Senior career*
Years	Team	Apps	(Gls)
2010–	HB Tórshavn	5	(0)
2009	HB Tórshavn	24	(2)
2008	HB Tórshavn	19	(6)
2007	HB Tórshavn	22	(4)
2006	HB Tórshavn	25	(10)
2005	HB Tórshavn	14	(6)
2005	NSÍ Runavík (loan)	5	(0)
2004	HB Tórshavn	2	(0)
2003	HB Tórshavn	4	(0)
2002	HB Tórshavn	1	(1)

International career^{‡}
2009–	Faroe Islands	1	(0)
- * Club domestic league appearances and goals as of 14 November 2010 ‡ National team caps and goals as of 14 November 2010

Páll Mohr Joensen is a Faroese footballer who plays for HB Tórshavn. In 2005, he joined NSÍ Runavík on loan until the end of the season. In the following season HB were expelled from the Faroe Islands Cup because Joensen was not eligible to play for HB in the first round match, due to HB not having the correct player certificate for Joensen after his loan at NSÍ. But HB were later reinstated. He missed much of the 2010 season while away travelling around Europe.

Joensen made his debut for Faroe Islands national team in March 2009 in a 2–1 win against Iceland.
