= 1942 Meistaradeildin =

Faroese football league season

Meistaradeildin
- Season: 1942
- Champions: KÍ Klaksvík (1st title)
- Matches played: 2
- Goals scored: 7 (3.5 per match)

1942 Meistaradeildin was the inaugural season of Meistaradeildin, the top tier of the Faroese football league system. It was performed in knockout rounds rather than in a league format. KÍ Klaksvík defeated TB Tvøroyri by 4–1 in the championship final.

== Qualifying round ==
=== East ===
==== Preliminary ====
The first leg was played on 21 June and the second leg on 28 June.

Team 1	Agg.	Team 2	1st leg	2nd leg
KÍ Klaksvík	8–3	EB Eiði	5–2	3–1

==== Final ====
The first leg was played on 5 July and the second leg on 19 July.

Team 1	Agg.	Team 2	1st leg	2nd leg
HB Tórshavn	1–14	KÍ Klaksvík	1–5	0–9

=== West ===
==== Preliminary ====
The first leg was played on 14 June and the second leg on 28 June.

Team 1	Agg.	Team 2	1st leg	2nd leg
SÍF Sandavágur	3–0	MB Miðvágur	2–0	1–0

==== Final ====
The first leg was played on 12 July and the second leg on 19 July.

Team 1	Agg.	Team 2	1st leg	2nd leg
SÍF Sandavágur	5–3	B36 Tórshavn	1–2	4–1 (a.e.t.)

=== South ===
==== Preliminary ====
The match was played on 14 June. A second leg was planned to be played on 21 June, but SVB withdrew after the first leg.

Team 1	Score	Team 2
SVB Sandvík	0–5	Royn Hvalba

==== Final ====
The match was played on 28 June. A second leg was planned to be played on 5 July, but Royn withdrew.

Team 1	Score	Team 2
TB Tvøroyri	5–0	Royn Hvalba

== Semi-finals ==
Match played on 26 July.

Team 1	Score	Team 2
SÍF Sandavágur	0–2	KÍ Klaksvík
TB Tvøroyri	bye	–

== Final ==
The match was played on 29 July.

Team 1	Score	Team 2
KÍ Klaksvík	4–1	TB Tvøroyri
