= Lasse Andersen =

Danish footballer (born 1995)

Personal information
- Full name: Lasse Thillitz Andersen
- Date of birth: 24 May 1995 (age 31)
- Place of birth: Denmark
- Position: Defender

Team information
- Current team: Kjellerup
- Number: 15

Youth career
- Kjellerup
- Viborg

Senior career*
Years	Team	Apps	(Gls)
2014–2015	Viborg	1	(0)
2015	→ Kjellerup (loan)		
2015–2018	Kjellerup		
2018–2019	HB Tórshavn	48	(0)
2020	Skive	5	(0)
2022–	Kjellerup		
- * Club domestic league appearances and goals as of 02:11, 6 January 2022 (UTC)

Lasse Thillitz Andersen (born 24 May 1995) is a Danish professional footballer who plays as a defender for Kjellerup IF.

== Career ==
Andersen started his senior career with Viborg FF in the Danish Superliga, where he made one league appearance. After that, he played for Kjellerup IF and Faroe club Havnar Bóltfelag. He joined Skive IK in February 2020. However, due to injuries, he was forced to take a break from playing in August 2020.

In the summer 2021, Andersen began training with his former club Kjellerup IF and in March 2022, he signed a contract with the club.
