= Dan í Soylu =

Faroese footballer

Personal information
- Full name: Dan Berg í Soylu
- Date of birth: 9 July 1996 (age 30)
- Place of birth: Faroe Islands
- Height: 1.86 m (6 ft 1 in)
- Position: Midfielder

Team information
- Current team: HB
- Number: 8

Youth career
- –2013: B71
- 2013–2014: HB

Senior career*
| Years | Team | Apps | (Gls) |
| 2012–2013 | B71 | 31 | (7) |
| 2014–2016 | AB II | 48 | (21) |
| 2014–2016 | AB | 35 | (2) |
| 2017 | EB/Streymur | 24 | (2) |
| 2018–2023 | HB | 150 | (28) |
| 2018–2019 | HB II | 5 | (0) |
| 2024 | KÍ | 24 | (1) |
| 2025– | HB | 52 | (5) |

International career^{‡}
| 2012 | Faroe Islands U17 | 4 | (0) |
| 2014 | Faroe Islands U19 | 2 | (0) |
| 2018 | Faroe Islands U21 | 2 | (0) |
| 2020– | Faroe Islands | 3 | (0) |
- * Club domestic league appearances and goals as of 1 November 2026 ‡ National team caps and goals as of 17 April 2023

Dan Berg í Soylu (born 9 July 1996) is a Faroese footballer who plays as a midfielder for HB and the Faroe Islands national team.

== Career ==
Soylu made his international debut for Faroe Islands on 3 September 2020 in the UEFA Nations League against Malta, coming on as a substitute in the 65th minute for Meinhard Olsen, with the match finishing as a 3–2 home win.

== Career statistics ==
=== International ===
As of 3 September 2020

Faroe Islands
| Year | Apps | Goals |
|---|---|---|
| 2020 | 1 | 0 |
| Total | 1 | 0 |
