= Julian Hansen =

Faroese footballer (born 1963)

Personal information
- Full name: Julian Frank Hansen
- Date of birth: 2 August 1963 (age 63)
- Position: Midfielder

Senior career*
Years	Team	Apps	(Gls)
1980–1987	HB Tórshavn	87	(7)
1988	AB Argir	1	(0)
1989	Stenløse Boldklub		
1990	HB Tórshavn	8	(1)
1997	HB Tórshavn	1	(0)

International career
1988–1992	Faroe Islands	7	(0)

Managerial career
- 2005: HB Tórshavn (caretaker)
- 2010–2011: HB Tórshavn
- * Club domestic league appearances and goals

Julian Hansen (born 2 August 1963) is a Faroese retired football midfielder.
