= 1998 Faroe Islands Cup =

Tournament details
- Country: Faroe Islands
- Teams: 18

Final positions
- Champions: HB Tórshavn
- Runners-up: KÍ Klaksvík

Tournament statistics
- Matches played: 51
- Goals scored: 245 (4.8 per match)
- Top goal scorer: John Petersen (12 goals)

The 1998 Faroe Islands Cup was played between 22 March and 17 June 1998. The cup was won by HB Torshavn.

== Preliminary round ==
The matches were played on 22 March 1998.

Team 1	Score	Team 2
FS Vágar	9–0	Fram
Royn Hvalba	2–1 (a.e.t.)	EB/Streymur
LÍF	4–0	Skála ÍF
B71	2–0	AB

== First round ==
The matches were played on 29 March 1998.

Team 1	Score	Team 2
Royn Hvalba	2–1	LÍF
B71	2–3	FS Vágar

== Second round ==
The second round (group stage) was played between 5 and 29 April 1998.

=== Group 1 ===
Pos	Team	Pld	W	D	L	GF	GA	GD	Pts	Qualification	HB	KÍ	NSÍ	FSV
1	HB Tórshavn	6	4	1	1	20	6	+14	13 (Note: Head-to-head points: HB Tórshavn 4, KÍ Klaksvík 1.)	Advanced to quarter-finals		1–1	3–0	6–1
2	KÍ Klaksvík	6	4	1	1	20	6	+14	13	Advanced to quarter-finals	1–3		2–1	8–0
3	NSÍ Runavík	6	3	0	3	19	6	+13	9	Advanced to quarter-finals	3–0	0–1		9–0
4	FS Vágar	6	0	0	6	2	43	−41	0		0–7	1–7	0–6	

=== Group 2 ===
Pos	Team	Pld	W	D	L	GF	GA	GD	Pts	Qualification	B36	ÍF	TB	SÍ
1	B36 Tórshavn	6	4	1	1	20	7	+13	13	Advanced to quarter-finals		2–0	1–2	4–1
2	ÍF Fuglafjørður	6	3	1	2	22	11	+11	10	Advanced to quarter-finals	2–4		3–1	11–0
3	TB Tvøroyri	6	2	2	2	14	13	+1	8		2–2	2–2		4–1
4	SÍ Sumba	6	1	0	5	8	33	−25	3		0–7	2–4	4–3	

=== Group 3 ===
Pos	Team	Pld	W	D	L	GF	GA	GD	Pts	Qualification	GÍ	B68	VB	ROY
1	GÍ Gøta	6	4	2	0	21	9	+12	14	Advanced to quarter-finals		4–3	3–3	7–0
2	B68 Toftir	6	3	1	2	20	9	+11	10	Advanced to quarter-finals	2–3		3–0	7–1
3	VB Vágur	6	2	3	1	13	10	+3	9	Advanced to quarter-finals	1–1	1–1		3–1
4	Royn Hvalba	6	0	0	6	3	29	−26	0		0–3	0–4	1–5	

== Quarter-finals ==
The matches were played on 8 May 1998.

Team 1	Score	Team 2
HB	2–0	B68
GÍ	4–1	NSÍ
B36	8–0	VB
KÍ	3–1	ÍF

== Semi-finals ==
The first legs were played on 21 May and the second legs on 29 May 1998.

Team 1	Agg.	Team 2	1st leg	2nd leg
KÍ	4–3	GÍ	2–1	2–2
HB	6–3	B36	4–1	2–2

== Final ==
17 June 1998

HB	2–0	KÍ
Lag 70'; Fløtum 75'

Gundadalur, Tórshavn
Referee: Niklas á Líðarenda
