= B36 =

B36 may refer to:

- B36 (New York City bus) in Brooklyn
- B36 Tórshavn, a Faroese football team
- Convair B-36 Peacemaker, a Cold War era strategic bomber
- B-36 Peacemaker Museum, an organization associated with the above aircraft
- B_{36}, a quasi-planar allotropic molecule composed of pure boron, the first known borophene
- Some versions of the Beechcraft Bonanza, a single piston engine six-seater aircraft
- GE B36-7
