= Johannes Hansen (footballer) =

Danish footballer (1886–1946)

Personal information
- Date of birth: 14 November 1886
- Date of death: 25 May 1946 (aged 59)

International career
Years	Team	Apps	(Gls)
1913–1917	Denmark	3	(0)

Johannes Hansen (14 November 1886 – 25 May 1946) was a Danish footballer. He played in three matches for the Denmark national football team from 1913 to 1917.
