= Haakon Lunov =

Norwegian football coach (born 1982)

Haakon Lunov (born 15 July 1982) is a Norwegian football coach, who is the manager of Norwegian club Gamle Oslo.

He was born in Drammen, but grew up in Asker. Without a professional playing career of his own, he studied briefly at the University of Oslo before taking up the football and science bachelor's programme at John Moores University. He had coached youth teams in Fossum IF and Stabæk Fotball, and while in Liverpool he worked on the analyst team of Everton F.C.'s youth section. Back in Norway he was regarded as a highly skilled football analyst and was hired as a played developer in Odd Grenland. For the 2010 FIFA World Cup he was brought in as an expert commentator in the Viasat TV channel.

Lunov's contract with Odd was not renewed after the 2010 season, and he went on to Strømsgodset IF. Here he was the head of player development and became assistant manager. He left in 2014 to reunite with his old manager Ronny Deila in Celtic F.C., but the tenure was short and Lunov returned to Strømsgodset shortly before Deila was sacked as Celtic manager. Ahead of the 2018 season Lunov left Strømsgodset and became the assistant manager of Vålerenga Fotball under Ronny Deila. When Deila resigned near New Year's Eve of 2019, Lunov was put in charge of the team. He did not become Vålerenga manager on a permanent basis, but took over IF Fram Larvik ahead of the 2021 season.
