= Gunnar Vatnhamar =

Faroese footballer (born 1995)

Personal information
- Full name: Gunnar Vatnhamar
- Date of birth: 29 March 1995 (age 31)
- Place of birth: Leirvík, Faroe Islands
- Height: 1.88 m (6 ft 2 in)
- Position: Midfielder

Team information
- Current team: Vejle Boldklub
- Number: 15

Youth career
- –2012: Víkingur Gøta

Senior career*
Years	Team	Apps	(Gls)
2012–2014	Víkingur Gøta II	62	(4)
2013–2023	Víkingur Gøta	208	(33)
2023–2026	Víkingur Reykjavík	82	(10)
2026–	Vejle Boldklub	1	(0)

International career^{‡}
2015	Faroe Islands U21	1	(0)
2018–	Faroe Islands	64	(3)
- * Club domestic league appearances and goals as of 4 September 2026 ‡ National team caps and goals as of 16 November 2026

Gunnar Vatnhamar (born 29 March 1995) is a Faroese professional footballer who plays as a midfielder for Vejle Boldklub.

== Club career ==
In April 2023, Víkingur Reykjavík announced that they had agreed a deal to sign Vatnhamar, who prior to the move had spent his entire career at Víkingur Gøta. After 3 years at Vikingur, he signed for Danish club Vejle Boldklub on 1 September 2026.

== International career ==
Vatnhamar made his international debut for the Faroe Islands national football team in a friendly 1–1 tie with Latvia on 22 March 2018, coming on as a substitute in the 88th minute. He scored his first goal on 11 November 2020, in a friendly against Lithuania. It was the only goal for the Faroes, who lost 2–1.

=== International goals ===
Scores and results list Faroe Islands' goal tally first.

#	Date	Venue	Opponent	Score	Result	Competition
1.	11 November 2020	LFF Stadium, Vilnius, Lithuania	Lithuania	1–2	1–2	Friendly
2.	14 November 2020	Daugava Stadium, Riga, Latvia	Latvia	1–1	1–1	2020–21 UEFA Nations League D
3.	22 March 2025	Malšovická aréna, Hradec Králové, Czech Republic	Czech Republic	1–1	1–2	2026 FIFA World Cup qualification – UEFA Group L

== Personal life ==
Whilst playing in his native Faroe Islands, Vatnhamar worked as a personal trainer while also playing football. His brother Sølvi Vatnhamar also plays football, for Víkingur Gøta and the national team.

== Honours ==
Víkingur Gøta

- Faroe Islands Premier League: 2016, 2017
- Faroe Islands Cup: 2014, 2015
- Faroe Islands Super Cup: 2014, 2015, 2016, 2017, 2018

Víkingur Reykjavík

- Besta deild karla: 2023, 2025
- Icelandic Men's Football Cup: 2023
