= Faroe Islands national under-19 football team =

Faroe Islands U19
- Association: Faroe Islands; Football Association
- Confederation: UEFA (Europe)
- Head coach: Fróði Benjaminsen
- Home stadium: Tórsvøllur and Svangaskarð
- FIFA code: FRO
First colours	Second colours

First international
- Faroe Islands 1–2 Scotland (Križevci, Croatia; October 24, 2001)

Biggest win
- Faroe Islands 4–0 San Marino (Vila Verde, Portugal; November 9, 2011)

Biggest defeat
- Portugal 9–1 Faroe Islands (Póvoa de Varzim, Portugal; November 5, 2011)

The Faroe Islands U19 National Team represents the Faroe Islands at under-19 age level and is controlled by the Faroe Islands Football Association.

The team is most recently took part in the 2012 UEFA Under-19 qualifiers in the first qualification round, in November 2011.

== Current squad ==
- The following players were called up for the 2027 UEFA European Under-19 Championship qualification matches.
- Match dates: 25, 28 and March 2026
- Opposition: North Macedonia, Netherlands, Moldova
- Caps and goals correct as of: 19 November 2025, after the match against Bulgaria

No.	Pos.	Player	Date of birth (age)	Caps	Goals	Club
	GK	Markus Johansen	23 September 2008 (age 18)	0	0	(Faroe Islands Football Association) 07 Vestur
	GK	Tróndur Sjúrdarson	6 July 2008 (age 18)	5	0	(Faroe Islands Football Association) HB
	DF	Heini Guttesen	6 November 2008 (age 18)	0	0	(Faroe Islands Football Association) B36 Tórshavn
	DF	Jens Eiler Samsson	23 February 2008 (age 18)	5	0	(Faroe Islands Football Association) Víkingur Gøta
	DF	Jónas Gaard	16 October 2008 (age 18)	2	0	(Faroe Islands Football Association) HB
	DF	Silas Joensen	14 March 2008 (age 18)	3	0	(Faroe Islands Football Association) HB
	DF	Rasmus Helgason	18 April 2008 (age 18)	6	0	(Faroe Islands Football Association) 07 Vestur
	DF	Eyðtór Joensen	26 August 2008 (age 18)	3	0	(Faroe Islands Football Association) TB
	DF	Jógvan í Lon	27 February 2008 (age 18)	0	0	(Faroe Islands Football Association) HB
	MF	Djóni Sivertsen	20 June 2008 (age 18)	6	0	(Faroe Islands Football Association) B36 Tórshavn
	MF	Benadiktus Olsen	2 March 2008 (age 18)	5	0	(Faroe Islands Football Association) NSÍ Runavík
	MF	Ørvur Isfeld	14 September 2008 (age 18)	0	0	(Faroe Islands Football Association) AB Argir
	MF	Jógvan í Skála	15 April 2008 (age 18)	9	0	(Faroe Islands Football Association) HB
	MF	Jónas Samuelsen	29 January 2008 (age 18)	3	0	(Faroe Islands Football Association) B68 Toftir
	MF	Kristian Jacobsen	8 October 2008 (age 18)	0	0	(Faroe Islands Football Association) Víkingur Gøta
	FW	Dánial Mørkøre	20 July 2008 (age 18)	5	1	(Danish Football Association) Vejle BK
	FW	Páll Müller	9 February 2008 (age 18)	3	0	(Faroe Islands Football Association) KÍ
	FW	Ezra Lukama	10 September 2008 (age 18)	0	0	(Faroe Islands Football Association) KÍ

== 2012 UEFA European Under-19 Football Championship qualification ==
Team	Pld	W	D	L	GF	GA	GD	Pts
Portugal	3	2	1	0	18	4	+14	7
Hungary	3	2	1	0	11	4	+7	7
Faroe Islands	3	1	0	2	6	12	–6	3
San Marino	3	0	0	3	0	15	–15	0

== The Squad of October 2012 ==
Player	Club
Jákup Højgaard	B36 Tórshavn
Rasmus Dan Sørensen	B36 Tórshavn
Poul N. Mikkelsen	KÍ Klaksvík
Tórur Justesen	KÍ Klaksvík
Eli Nolsøe Leifsson	HB Tórshavn
Rói av Fløtum	HB Tórshavn
Eirikkur Magnussarson	TB Tvøroyri
Teitur J. Olsen	TB Tvøroyri
Ragnar Tausen	TB Tvøroyri
Poul Ingason	TB Tvøroyri
Allan J. Hansen	EB/Streymur
Hørður Askham	07 Vestur
Haraldur R. Højgaard	B68 Toftir
Patrick Larsen	B36 Tórshavn
Sonni Ragnar Nattestad	FC Midtjylland (DK)
Marcus Bruun Rasmussen	Suså IF (DK)
Andrias Eriksen	Varde IF (DK)
Jón Áki Jacobsen	FC Suðuroy

== The Squad of 2010 ==
The coaches Abraham Løkin and Eli Hentze selected the squad for the UEFA Under 19 qualifier matches in October 2010 against Croatia U19, Italy U19 and Latvia U19.

No.	Pos.	Player	Date of birth (age)	Caps	Goals	Club
	GK	Elias Rasmussen	May 13, 1996 (age 30)	2	0	(Faroe Islands Football Association) OB
	GK	Frídi Sigurdsson	September 9, 1995 (age 31)	0	0	(Faroe Islands Football Association) NSÍ Runavík
	DF	Karl Martin Danielsen	April 20, 1995 (age 31)	3	0	(Faroe Islands Football Association) Víkingur Gøta
	DF	Dánjal Godtfred	March 7, 1996 (age 30)	2	0	(Faroe Islands Football Association) FC Fyn
	DF	Benjamin Heinesen	March 26, 1996 (age 30)	2	0	(Faroe Islands Football Association) KÍ Klaksvík
	DF	Poul Mikkelsen	April 19, 1995 (age 31)	1	0	(Faroe Islands Football Association) Brøndby IF
	DF	Hákun Edmundsson	March 21, 1996 (age 30)	1	0	(Faroe Islands Football Association) 07 Vestur
	DF	John Gudjónsson	September 17, 1996 (age 30)	0	0	(Faroe Islands Football Association) Odense BK
	DF	Jón Jacobsen	November 2, 1995 (age 31)	0	0	(Faroe Islands Football Association) Odense BK
	DF	Teitur Olsen	May 10, 1995 (age 31)	0	0	(Faroe Islands Football Association) Odense BK
-	MF	Johannes Hansen	December 31, 1995 (age 30)	0	0	(Faroe Islands Football Association) Kastrup BK
-	MF	Jogvan Jacobsen	February 16, 1996 (age 30)	1	0	(Faroe Islands Football Association) ÍF Fuglafjørður
	MF	Brandur Olsen	December 19, 1995 (age 30)	4	1	(Danish Football Association) Copenhagen
	MF	Rasmus Dan Sørensen	May 27, 1995 (age 31)	1	0	(Faroe Islands Football Association) Vejle BK
	MF	Heraldur Reinert Højgaard	March 21, 1995 (age 31)	0	0	(Faroe Islands Football Association) KÍ Klaksvík
	MF	Tórdur Justesen	January 4, 1995 (age 31)	3	0	(Faroe Islands Football Association) 07 Vestur
	FW	Poul Ingason	September 28, 1995 (age 31)	3	0	(Faroe Islands Football Association) HB Tórshavn
