= Faroe Islands Football Association =

Governing body of all domestic football in the Faroe Islands

Fótbóltssamband Føroya
UEFA
- Founded: 13 January 1979
- Headquarters: Tórshavn
- FIFA affiliation: 1988
- UEFA affiliation: 1990
- President: Christian Andreasen
- Website: https://www.fsf.fo

The Faroe Islands Football Association (Faroese: Fótbóltssamband Føroya or FSF, is the governing body of all domestic football in the Faroe Islands, the highest level of which is the Faroe Islands Premier League. It also runs the Faroe Islands national teams for men and women. Established in 1979, it is based in Tórshavn.

== History ==
Organized football has been played in the Faroes since late 19th century. The first Faroese national football league (Meistaradeildin) was held in 1942. From 1942 until 1978, all Faroese football was governed by ÍSF (the Faroese Sports Association). On 13 January 1979, the Faroese Football Association was established. At first it worked with organizing Faroese football. The first Faroese national football league for women was held in 1985.

In the 1980s, the Faroese Football Association started training coaches and managers. At first it was done with help from Denmark, but since the mid-1990s, this training has been under full Faroese responsibility.

On 2 July 1988, the Faroe Islands gained membership of FIFA, and on 18 April 1990, they gained membership of UEFA. Since then the Faroes have participated in international football competitions.

== See also ==
- Faroe Islands national football team results
