= Sølvi Vatnhamar =

Faroese footballer (born 1986)

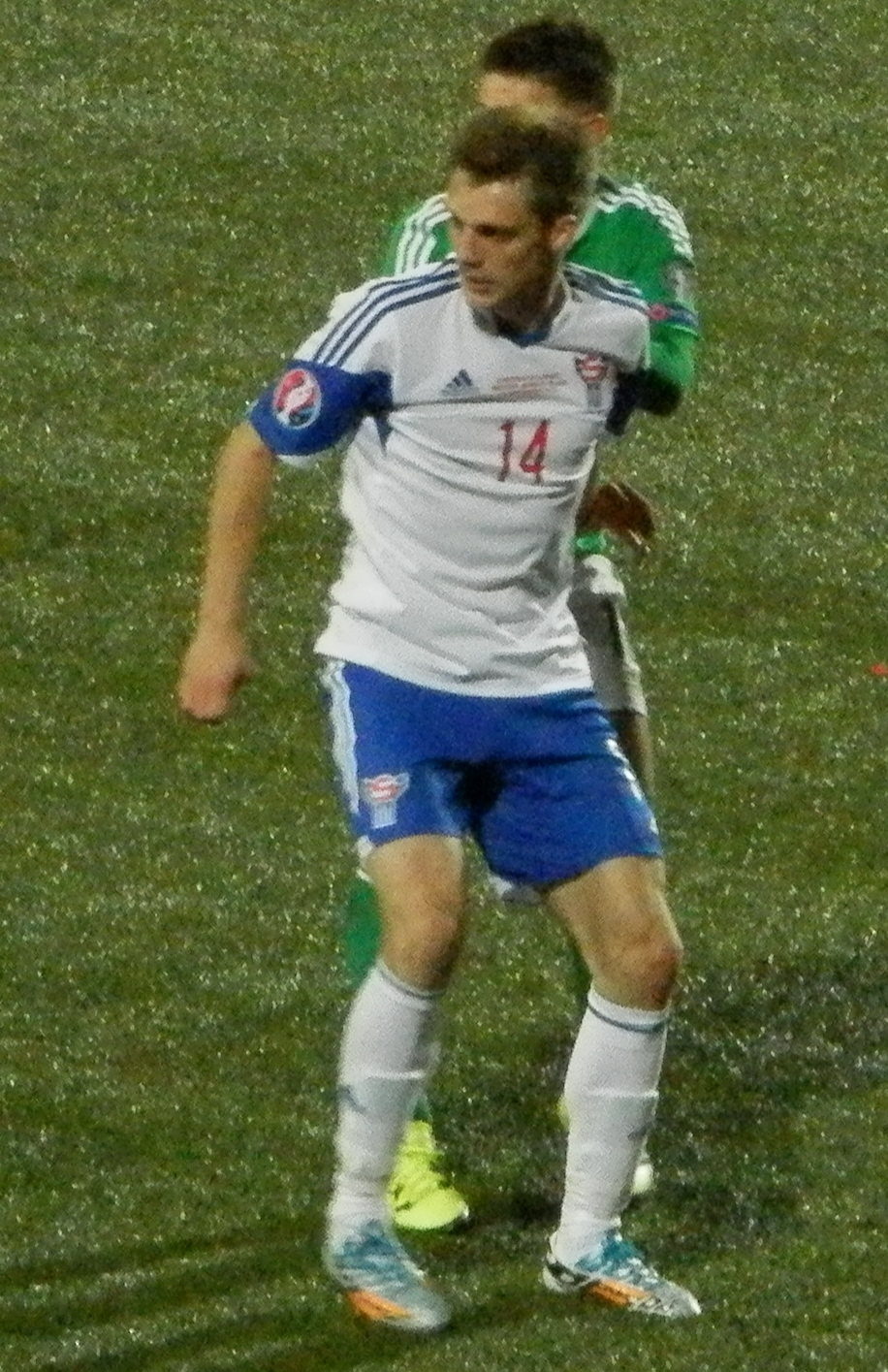

Personal information
- Date of birth: 5 May 1986 (age 40)
- Place of birth: Leirvík, Faroe Islands
- Positions: Midfielder; winger

Team information
- Current team: Víkingur
- Number: 10

Senior career*
Years	Team	Apps	(Gls)
2003–2007	LÍF Leirvík	76	(22)
2008–	Víkingur	458	(155)

International career^{‡}
2007–2008	Faroe Islands U21	3	(0)
2013–	Faroe Islands	79	(2)
- * Club domestic league appearances and goals as of 1 November 2026 ‡ National team caps and goals as of 17 November 2024

Sølvi Vatnhamar (born 5 May 1986) is a Faroese footballer who plays as an attacking midfielder for Víkingur and the Faroe Islands national football team. He also works as a constructor next to his football career, and his brother Gunnar Vatnhamar is also a footballer who has played with him on the national team.

On 13 June 2015 he played his fifth match for the Faroe Islands national football team at the Tórsvøllur stadium against Greece. The Faroe Islands won 2–1 with goals by Hallur Hansson and Brandur Olsen; Vatnhamar assisted both goals.

On 28 March 2016, Vatnhamar scored his first international goal in a 3–2 win against Liechtenstein

== International ==
=== International goals ===
Scores and results list Faroe Islands' goal tally first.

No.	Date	Venue	Opponent	Score	Result	Competition
1	28 March 2016	Estadio Municipal de Marbella, Marbella, Spain	Liechtenstein	3–0	3–2	Friendly
2	15 November 2021	Netanya Stadium, Netanya, Israel	Israel	1–2	2–3	2022 FIFA World Cup qualification

== Honour ==
- 2016 – Player of the year in the Faroe Islands Premier League.
