= Klaksvíkar Ítróttarfelag =

Association football club in the Faroe Islands

KÍ
- Full name: Klaksvíkar Ítróttarfelag
- Short name: KÍ
- Founded: 24 August 1904; 122 years ago
- Ground: Við Djúpumýrar
- Capacity: 2,600 (1,300 seated)
- Chairman: Tummas Lervig
- Manager: Fróði Benjaminsen
- League: Faroe Islands Premier League
- 2025: Faroe Islands Premier League, 1st of 10 (champions)
- Website: http://www.ki.fo/
Home colours	Away colours

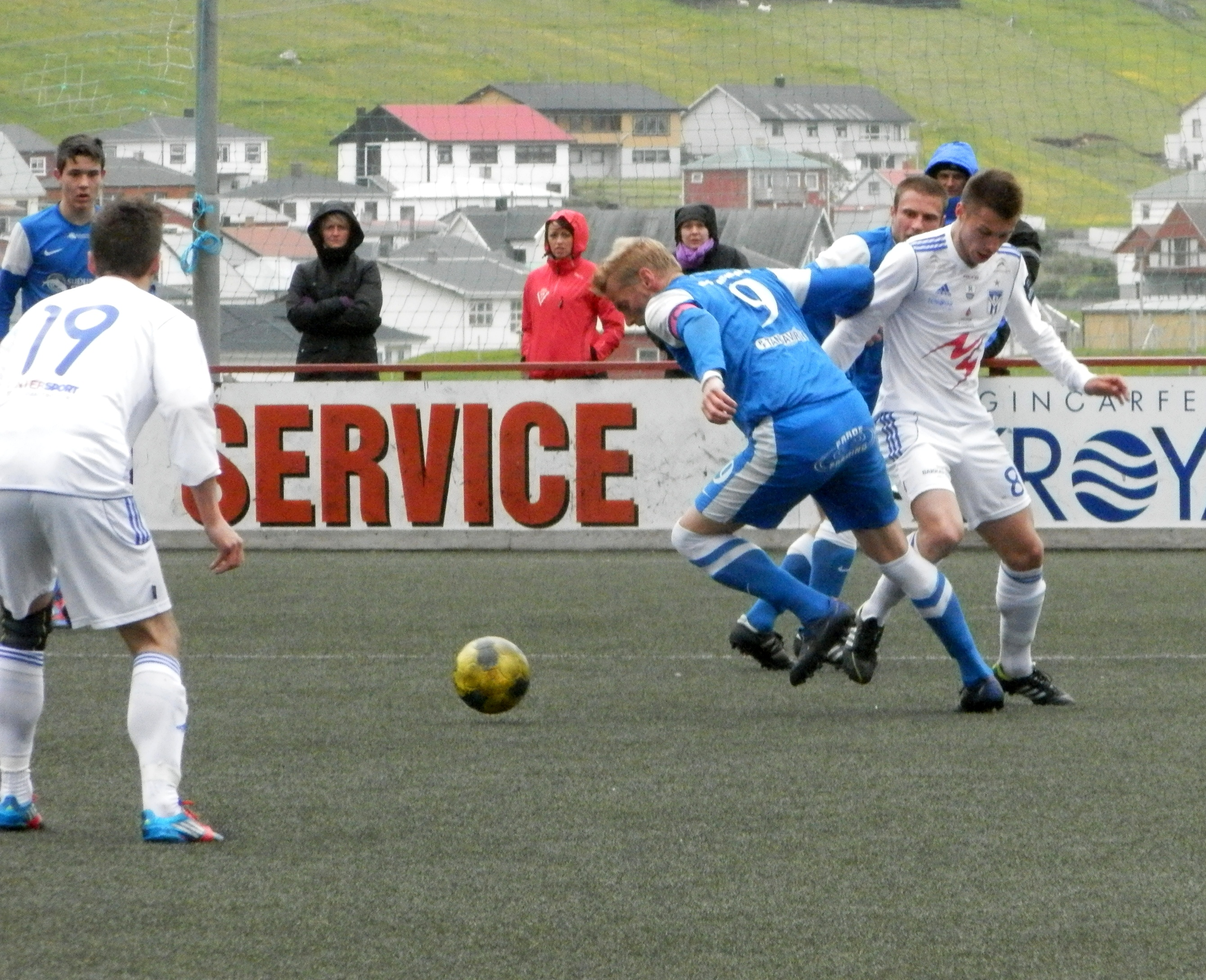
KÍ Klaksvík (in white) v.s FC Suðuroy (in light blue) in Effodeildin on 30 June 2012.

Klaksvíkar Ítróttarfelag ("Klaksvík Sports Club"), commonly abbreviated to KÍ and also known as KÍ Klaksvík, is a Faroese professional football club based in Klaksvík. The club was founded in 1904 and is one of the most successful Faroese football clubs, having won the Faroe Islands Premier League twenty-one times and the Faroe Islands Cup six times. The club wears blue and white and plays matches at the Við Djúpumýrar stadium.

KÍ Klaksvík notably became the first Faroese football club to play in the group stage of a major UEFA-organised European competition, qualifying for this phase in the 2023–24 edition of the UEFA Europa Conference League.

== History ==
Klaksvíkar Ítróttarfelag won the inaugural edition of Faroese top-tier football in 1942. In 1992, KÍ Klaksvík participated for the first time on a European stage, competing in the Champions League preliminary round against Skonto Riga of Latvia, where they lost 6–1 on aggregate.

By winning the double in 1999, KÍ reached a total of 17 league titles, a record at the time. KÍ didn't win the league title again until 2019, and although it held the honour of having won the most league titles since the 1950s, it was surpassed by HB in 2004. Although the team signed former great Todi Jónsson and local Atli Danielsen in July 2009 for the remainder of the season, KÍ was relegated for the first time in the club's 105 year-long history at the time. Despite a slow start, they managed to return to the top league for 2011, when they finished fifth under the guidance of manager Aleksandar Đorđević.

In 2012, KÍ did one better than the previous year, and finished in 4th position. The team was the most potent attacking side, scoring 59 goals in 27 matches; Páll Klettskarð scored 22 goals and was the joint top-scorer. In the buildup to the 2013 season, Atli Danielsen and Meinhardt Joensen were signed, helping KÍ to reach the semi-final of the cup. However, they finished the league season in a disappointing 8th place. Ndende Adama Guéye was signed after the season, and the team hired a new manager, Mikkjal Thomassen, who managed the team until 2022. The new manager implemented a new system, foreign to most of the players, and so KÍ experienced a difficult start to the season. Later in the first half of the season, the team had implemented the style, playing attractive, free-flowing attacking football, eventually finishing fifth. In 2016, they missed out on their first league title since 1999 by just one point to Víkingur Gøta, although they did win the Faroe Islands Cup. The next year, they lost the title to the same team by an even closer margin, only having a slightly worse goal difference. While the next season was a disappointment, with the team only finishing fifth, the following years, starting with the 2019 season would prove remarkable ones.

That year, KÍ not only won their first title in twenty years, but they managed to reach the second qualifying round of the UEFA Europa League for the first time, defeating Riteriai from Lithuania on away goals. In 2020, KÍ went one better, becoming the first Faroese team to qualify for the Europa League playoff round by beating Dinamo Tbilisi 6–1 in the third qualifying round, which KÍ had reached for the first time. This shock result, against a much larger and more prestigious European club, was watched by seventy percent of the Klaksvík population, and set up what was labelled 'the biggest game in their history' against the Irish club Dundalk F.C, which they lost 3–1.

In 2023, KÍ advanced to the second qualifying round of the Champions League for only the second time in their history by defeating 34-time Hungarian champions Ferencváros 3–0 on aggregate, consisting of a 0–0 draw in Klaksvík and a 3–0 win in Budapest, rivalling their win over Dinamo Tbilisi as the biggest result in the history of the club. The Faroese club faced Swedish side BK Häcken in the second qualifying round, beating them 4–3 on penalties after drawing 3–3 on aggregate. This historic result meant that KÍ became the first ever Faroese side to reach the third qualifying round of the Champions League. This result guaranteed the club's continental football path/route until at least December 2023 and meant they would also become the first ever Faroese side to play in the group stages of a European competition. Klaksvík played Norwegian club Molde in the third qualifying round, defeating them with a scoreline of 2–1 in the home leg; however, this was overturned in the away leg with a 2–0 defeat in extra time. During the run, striker Árni Frederiksberg scored 6 goals. Klaksvík then played the Moldovan club Sheriff Tiraspol in the Europa League play-off round, tying the home game 1–1 before losing 1–2 in the away match. The Faroese team got drawn into Group A of the Europa Conference League 2023-24 season, along with Lille, Slovan Bratislava and Olimpija Ljubljana. In their first game, they lost 2–1 to Slovan Bratislava, with Deni Pavlovic becoming KI's inaugural scorer in the group stages. They made history on October 5 by drawing 0–0 with Lille, becoming the first Faroese team to score a point in the group stages of a European competition, and on October 26, when they won against Olimpija Ljubljana 3–0, they became the first team from the Faroe Islands to win a game in the group stages of a European competition. After the season, manager Magne Hoseth left to manage Danish Superliga side Lyngby Boldklub, and the club hired Haakon Lunov to replace him.

== Stadium ==
KÍ Klaksvík plays its games in Við Djúpumýrar, a stadium with a seating capacity of 530 (2600 with standing places). For the team's 2020 European qualification, the Tórsvøllur stadium, which normally hosts the national team was used, since the Við Djúpumýrar stadium did not meet UEFA requirements for the third qualifying round and above.

== Current squad ==
As of 21 July 2026

Note: Flags indicate national team as defined under FIFA eligibility rules; some limited exceptions apply. Players may hold more than one non-FIFA nationality.

No.	Pos.	Nation	Player
1	GK	DEN	Sebastian John
2	DF	ARG	Gastón Tellechea
3	DF	NOR	Robert Williams
4	MF	NOR	Mansour Sinyan (on loan from KFUM Oslo)
5	MF	SRB	Deni Pavlović
6	DF	FRO	Daniel Johansen
7	FW	FRO	Árni Frederiksberg
8	MF	FRO	Jákup Andreasen (captain)
9	FW	FRO	Páll Klettskarð
10	MF	FRO	Hallur Hansson
11	FW	FRO	Jonn Johannessen
13	MF	FRO	Patrik Johannesen
14	MF	FRO	René Joensen
17	FW	NOR	Filip Brattbakk

No.	Pos.	Nation	Player
20	FW	NOR	Erlend Hustad
22	DF	FRO	Odmar Færø
23	DF	FRO	Jóannes Danielsen
24	MF	ARG	Martín González
25	MF	SWE	Hampus Näsström
26	DF	FRO	Gilli Rólantsson
27	FW	FRO	Dávid Reynheim
28	MF	NOR	Oussama Ali
29	DF	FRO	Símun Kalsø
36	DF	BRA	Jean Carlos
96	GK	DEN	Mark Jensen
99	GK	DEN	Nicolai Christensen
-	MF	FRO	Mads Boe Mikkelsen

== Notable former players ==
- Rógvi Jacobsen, played 53 matches for the Faroe Islands national team, scored 10 goals.
- Todi Jónsson, played 45 matches for the Faroe Islands national team, scored 9 goals. He played several years for FC Copenhagen in the Danish Superliga.
- Jákup Mikkelsen, played 73 matches for the Faroe Islands national football team as goalkeeper.
- Allan Mørkøre, played 54 matches for the Faroe Islands national team, scored 1 goal.
- Kurt Mørkøre, played 37 matches for the Faroe Islands national team, scored 3 goals.

== Managers ==
- (Faroe Islands) John Reid Bjartalíð (1945–1970)
- (Iceland) Sölvi Óskarsson (1972)
- (England) Tony Paris (1977–1978)
- (Denmark) Peter Kordt (1980)
- (Denmark) Jens Hvidemose (1983–1984)
- (Denmark) Peter Kordt (1985)
- (Faroe Islands) Olvheðin Jacobsen (1986)
- (Denmark) Steffen Petersen (1987)
- (Denmark) Jens Hvidemose (1988)
- (Denmark) John Kramer (1990)
- (Faroe Islands) Petur Mohr (1991–1994)
- (Faroe Islands) Sverri Jacobsen (1994–1995)
- (Faroe Islands) Jóannes Jakobsen (1996–1998)
- (England) Tony Paris (1999)
- (Federal Republic of Yugoslavia) Tomislav Sivić (2000–2001)
- (Faroe Islands) Kurt Mørkøre (2002)
- (Faroe Islands) Jan Joensen (2003)
- (Denmark) Ove Flindt Bjerg (2004–2005)
- (Faroe Islands) Oddbjørn Joensen (2005)
- (England) Tony Paris (2006–2007)
- (Faroe Islands) Trygvi Mortensen (2007)
- (Faroe Islands) Eyðun Klakkstein (2007–2008)
- (Faroe Islands) Petur Mohr (2008–2009)
- (Serbia) Aleksandar Đorđević & (Faroe Islands) Jákup Mikkelsen (2009)
- (Faroe Islands) Petur Mohr (2009–2010)
- (Serbia) Aleksandar Đorđević (2010–2011)
- (Iceland) Páll Guðlaugsson (2012–2013)
- (Faroe Islands) Eyðun Klakstein (2013–2014)
- (Faroe Islands) Mikkjal Thomassen (2014–2022)
- (Norway) Magne Hoseth (2022–2024)
- (Norway) Haakon Lunov (2024)
- (Norway) Espen Haug (2024)
- (Sweden) Magnus Powell (2025–2026)
- (Faroe Islands) Fróði Benjaminsen (2026–)

== Honours ==
- Faroe Islands Premier League
  - Winners (22): 1942, 1945, 1952, 1953, 1954, 1956, 1957, 1958, 1961, 1966, 1967, 1968, 1969, 1970, 1972, 1991, 1999, 2019, 2021, 2022, 2023, 2025
  - Runners-up (13): 1947, 1951, 1959, 1962, 1963, 1971, 1973, 1974, 1975, 1996, 1998, 2016, 2017
- Faroe Islands Cup
  - Winners (7): 1966, 1967, 1990, 1994, 1999, 2016, 2025
  - Runners-up (10): 1955, 1957, 1973, 1976, 1979, 1992, 1998, 2001, 2006, 2022
- Faroe Islands Super Cup
  - Winners (4): 2020, 2022, 2023, 2026
  - Runners-up (2): 2017, 2024

== European record ==
=== Overview ===
Competition	Matches	W	D	L	GF	GA
UEFA Champions League	22	8	5	9	26	33
UEFA Cup / UEFA Europa League	28	5	7	16	31	58
UEFA Europa Conference League	22	8	5	9	26	28
UEFA Cup Winners' Cup	2	1	0	1	3	6
TOTAL	74	22	17	35	86	125

=== Matches ===
Notes

- PR: Preliminary round
- QR: Qualifying round
- 1QR: First qualifying round
- 2QR: Second qualifying round
- 3QR: Third qualifying round
- PO: Playoff round

Season	Competition	Round	Club	Home	Away	Aggregate
1992–93	UEFA Champions League	PR	(Latvia) Skonto	1–3	0–3	1–6
1995–96	UEFA Cup Winners' Cup	QR	(Israel) Maccabi Haifa	3–2	0–4	3–6
1997–98	UEFA Cup	1QR	(Hungary) Újpest	2–3	0–6	2–9
1999–2000	UEFA Cup	QR	(Austria) Grazer AK	0–5	0–4	0–9
2000–01	UEFA Champions League	1QR	(Serbia and Montenegro) Crvena Zvezda	0–3	0–2	0–5
2002–03	UEFA Cup	QR	(Hungary) Újpest	2–2	0–1	2–3
2003–04	UEFA Cup	QR	(Norway) Molde	0–2	0–4	0–6
2017–18	UEFA Europa League	1QR	(Sweden) AIK	0–0	0–5	0–5
2018–19	UEFA Europa League	PR	(Malta) Birkirkara	2–1	1–1	3–2
2018–19	UEFA Europa League	1QR	(Lithuania) Žalgiris	1–2	1–1	2–3
2019–20	UEFA Europa League	PR	(San Marino) Tre Fiori	5–1	4–0	9–1
2019–20	UEFA Europa League	1QR	(Lithuania) Riteriai	0–0	1–1	1–1 (a)
2019–20	UEFA Europa League	2QR	(Switzerland) Luzern	0–1	0–1	0–2
2020–21	UEFA Champions League	1QR	(Slovakia) Slovan Bratislava	3–0 (awd.)	—N/a	—N/a
2020–21	UEFA Champions League	2QR	(Switzerland) Young Boys	—N/a	1–3	—N/a
2020–21	UEFA Europa League	3QR	(Georgia (country)) Dinamo Tbilisi	6−1	—N/a	—N/a
2020–21	UEFA Europa League	PO	(Republic of Ireland) Dundalk	—N/a	1–3	—N/a
2021–22	UEFA Europa Conference League	1QR	(Latvia) RFS	2–4 (a.e.t.)	3−2	5–6
2022–23	UEFA Champions League	1QR	(Norway) Bodø/Glimt	3–1	0–3	3–4
2022–23	UEFA Europa Conference League	2QR	(Montenegro) Sutjeska Nikšić	1–0	0–0	1–0
2022–23	UEFA Europa Conference League	3QR	(Kosovo) Ballkani	2–1 (a.e.t.)	2–3	4–4 (3–4 p)
2023–24	UEFA Champions League	1QR	(Hungary) Ferencváros	0–0	3–0	3–0
2023–24	UEFA Champions League	2QR	(Sweden) BK Häcken	0–0	3–3 (a.e.t.)	3–3 (4–3 p)
2023–24	UEFA Champions League	3QR	(Norway) Molde	2–1	0–2 (a.e.t.)	2–3
2023–24	UEFA Europa League	PO	(Moldova) Sheriff Tiraspol	1–1	1–2	2–3
2023–24	UEFA Europa Conference League	GS	(France) Lille	0–0	0–3	4th
2023–24	UEFA Europa Conference League	GS	(Slovakia) Slovan Bratislava	1–2	1–2	4th
2023–24	UEFA Europa Conference League	GS	(Slovenia) Olimpija Ljubljana	3–0	0–2	4th
2024–25	UEFA Champions League	1QR	(Luxembourg) Differdange 03	2–0	0–0	2–0
2024–25	UEFA Champions League	2QR	(Sweden) Malmö FF	3–2	1–4	4–6
2024–25	UEFA Europa League	3QR	(Bosnia and Herzegovina) Borac Banja Luka	2–1	1–3 (a.e.t.)	3–4
2024–25	UEFA Conference League	PO	(Finland) HJK Helsinki	2–2	1–2	3–4
2025–26	UEFA Conference League	1QR	(Finland) SJK Seinäjoki	2–0	2–1	4–1
2025–26	UEFA Conference League	2QR	(Serbia) Radnički 1923	1–0	0–0	1–0
2025–26	UEFA Conference League	3QR	(Belarus) Neman Grodno	2–0	0–2 (a.e.t.)	2–2 (4–5 p)
2026–27	UEFA Champions League	1QR	(Luxembourg) Atert Bissen	2–1	2–1	4–2
2026–27	UEFA Champions League	2QR	(Lithuania) Kauno Žalgiris	0–0	0–1	0–1
2026–27	UEFA Europa League	3QR	(Poland) Lech Poznań	0–5	0–1	0–6
2026–27	UEFA Conference League	PO	(Latvia) Riga	0–0	1–2	1–2
2027–28	UEFA Conference League	1QR				

== See also ==
- KÍ Klaksvík (women)
- List of football clubs in the Faroe Islands
