= Faroe Islands Cup =

- Founded: 1955; 71 years ago
- Region: Faroe Islands
- Teams: 15
- Qualifier for: UEFA Conference League
- Current champions: Víkingur (7th title)
- Most championships: Havnar Bóltfelag (30 titles)
- 2026 Faroe Islands Cup

The Faroe Islands Cup (Faroese: Løgmanssteypið, literally the Prime Minister Cup) is the main football cup competition in the Faroe Islands. The first edition was played in 1955.

== History ==
=== The HB–TB decade ===
The first decade of the competition was marked by the alternance of titles between HB and TB. Only in its eleventh year, the cup saw a different champion, with B36 defeating rivals HB in the final.

=== Subsequent years ===
In the subsequent editions, the other former finalists also got their first titles; KÍ in 1966, and VB in 1974.

1970 was the only time a final was not played, as the Faroe Islands Sports Association (ÍSF) choose to annul the competition after KÍ, and later VB, refused to play against HB in Tórshavn. HB continued to enjoy success, but TB won the competition just once after the first decade, in 1977.

In 1979 the Faroe Islands Football Association was founded and took over the organization of the competition, opening the cup to teams from every division.

In the 1980s new champions were crowned, with GÍ winning in 1983 and NSÍ in 1985; and the 1990s also had its first-time winners with B71's title in 1993.

The construction of the national stadium Tórsvøllur saw the majority of the finals being played there since 2000.

=== HB drought and the Víkingur−EB/Streymur rivalry ===
Frequent winners HB went through what was then their longest period without a cup title, not winning for five years, between 1999 and 2003. This ended in the club's centenary year, when they defeated NSÍ in the final. But the club entered in a longer drought, which ended in 2019, where they defeated Víkingur in the final.

From 2007 until 2015 the competition was dominated by EB/Streymur and Víkingur, similar to the HB–TB period. The two teams alternated titles and faced each other in three finals, all won by Víkingur.

KÍ put an end to this period defeating Víkingur on penalties in the 2016 final.

== Finals ==
Season	Champion	Result	Runners-up	Venue
1955	HB	3–1	KÍ	Gundadalur, Tórshavn
1956	TB	5–2	VB	Gundadalur, Tórshavn
1957	HB	1–0	KÍ	Gundadalur, Tórshavn
1958	TB	5–3	HB	Sevmýri, Tvøroyri
1959	HB	1–0	B36	Gundadalur, Tórshavn
1960	TB	3–0	HB	Gundadalur, Tórshavn
1961	TB	2–0	B36	Sevmýri, Tvøroyri
1962	HB	2–1 (a.e.t.)	TB	Gundadalur, Tórshavn
1963	HB	7–1	B36	Gundadalur, Tórshavn
1964	HB	3–3 (a.e.t.)	B36	Sevmýri, Tvøroyri
1964	HB	Replay: 4–3 (a.e.t.)	B36	Gundadalur, Tórshavn
1965	B36	3–2	HB	Gundadalur, Tórshavn
1966	KÍ	4–2	HB	Sarpugerði, Norðragøta
1967	KÍ	6–2	B36	Sarpugerði, Norðragøta
1968	HB	2–1	B36	Gundadalur, Tórshavn
1969	HB	2–0	B36	Gundadalur, Tórshavn
1970	Final not played (Note: HB and KÍ had reached the final, but KÍ refused to play the match at HB's homeground in Tórshavn; losing semifinalists VB were asked to play in their place but also refused; the ÍSF decided to annul the competition (instead of awarding HB the cup).)			
1971	HB	9–0	TB	Gundadalur, Tórshavn
1972	HB	6–1	B36	Gundadalur, Tórshavn
1973	HB	3–1	KÍ	Gundadalur, Tórshavn
1974	VB	4–0	HB	Á Eiðinum, Vágur
1974	VB	3–5	HB	Gundadalur, Tórshavn
1974	VB won 7–5 on aggregate			
1975	HB	5–2	ÍF	Í Fløtugerði, Fuglafjørður
1975	HB	2–2	ÍF	Gundadalur, Tórshavn
1975	HB won 7–4 on aggregate			
1976	HB	1–0	KÍ	Við Djúpumýrar, Klaksvík
1976	HB	3–0	KÍ	Gundadalur, Tórshavn
1976	HB won 4–0 on aggregate			
1977	TB	1–3	VB	Sevmýri, Tvøroyri
1977	TB	3–0	VB	Á Eiðinum, Vágur
1977	TB won 4–3 on aggregate			
1978	HB	1–2	TB	Sevmýri, Tvøroyri
1978	HB	2–1	TB	Gundadalur, Tórshavn
1978	HB	Play-off: 3–1	TB	Inni í Dal, Sandur
1979	HB	5–0	KÍ	Gundadalur, Tórshavn
1980	HB	2–1	NSÍ	Gundadalur, Tórshavn
1981	HB	5–1	TB	Gundadalur, Tórshavn
1982	HB	2–1	ÍF	Gundadalur, Tórshavn
1983	GÍ	5–1	Royn	Gundadalur, Tórshavn
1984	HB	2–0	GÍ	Undir Mýruhjalla, Skála
1985	GÍ	4–2	NSÍ	Í Fløtugerði, Fuglafjørður
1986	NSÍ	2–1	LÍF	Gundadalur, Tórshavn
1987	HB	2–2 (a.e.t.)	ÍF	Gundadalur, Tórshavn
1987	HB	Replay: 3–0	ÍF	Gundadalur, Tórshavn
1988	HB	1–0	NSÍ	Gundadalur, Tórshavn
1989	HB	1–1 (a.e.t.)	B71	Gundadalur, Tórshavn
1989	HB	Replay: 2–0	B71	Gundadalur, Tórshavn
1990	KÍ	6–1	GÍ	Gundadalur, Tórshavn
1991	B36	1–0	HB	Gundadalur, Tórshavn
1992	HB	1–0	KÍ	Gundadalur, Tórshavn
1993	B71	1–1 (a.e.t.)	HB	Gundadalur, Tórshavn
1993	B71	Replay: 2–1	HB	Gundadalur, Tórshavn
1994	KÍ	2–1	B71	Gundadalur, Tórshavn
1995	HB	3–1	B68	Gundadalur, Tórshavn
1996	GÍ	2–2 (a.e.t.)	HB	Gundadalur, Tórshavn
1996	GÍ	Replay: 5–3 (a.e.t.)	HB	Gundadalur, Tórshavn
1997	GÍ	6–0	VB	Gundadalur, Tórshavn
1998	HB	2–0	KÍ	Gundadalur, Tórshavn
1999	KÍ	3–1	B36	Gundadalur, Tórshavn
2000	GÍ	1–0	HB	Tórsvøllur, Tórshavn
2001	B36	1–0	KÍ	Tórsvøllur, Tórshavn
2002	NSÍ	2–1	HB	Tórsvøllur, Tórshavn
2003	B36	3–1 (a.e.t.)	GÍ	Tórsvøllur, Tórshavn
2004	HB	3–1	NSÍ	Tórsvøllur, Tórshavn
2005	GÍ	4–1	ÍF	Tórsvøllur, Tórshavn
2006	B36	2–1	KÍ	Gundadalur, Tórshavn
2007	EB/Streymur	4–3	HB	Gundadalur, Tórshavn
2008	EB/Streymur	3–2	B36	Gundadalur, Tórshavn
2009	Víkingur	3–2	EB/Streymur	Gundadalur, Tórshavn
2010	EB/Streymur	1–0	ÍF	Við Djúpumýrar, Klaksvík
2011	EB/Streymur	3–0	ÍF	Við Djúpumýrar, Klaksvík
2012	Víkingur	3–3 (a.e.t.), (5–4 p)	EB/Streymur	Tórsvøllur, Tórshavn
2013	Víkingur	2–0	EB/Streymur	Tórsvøllur, Tórshavn
2014	Víkingur	1–0	HB	Tórsvøllur, Tórshavn
2015	Víkingur	3–0	NSÍ	Tórsvøllur, Tórshavn
2016	KÍ	1–1 (a.e.t.), (5–3 p)	Víkingur	Tórsvøllur, Tórshavn
2017	NSÍ	1–0	B36	Tórsvøllur, Tórshavn
2018	B36	2–2 (a.e.t.), (5–4 p)	HB	Tórsvøllur, Tórshavn
2019	HB	3–1	Víkingur	Tórsvøllur, Tórshavn
2020	HB	2–0	Víkingur	Tórsvøllur, Tórshavn
2021	B36	1–1 (a.e.t.), (4–3 p)	NSÍ	Tórsvøllur, Tórshavn
2022	Víkingur	1–0	KÍ	Tórsvøllur, Tórshavn
2023	HB	0–0 (a.e.t.), (5–3 p)	B68	Tórsvøllur, Tórshavn
2024	HB	2–2 (a.e.t.), (4–3 p)	B36	Tórsvøllur, Tórshavn
2025	KÍ	2–0	Víkingur	Tórsvøllur, Tórshavn
2026	Víkingur	2–0	KÍ	Tórsvøllur, Tórshavn

== Winners ==
Team	Location	Titles	Runners-up
HB	Tórshavn	30	13
B36	Tórshavn	7	12
KÍ	Klaksvík	7	11
Víkingur	Norðragøta	7	4
GÍ (Note: GÍ and LÍF merged to form Víkingur in 2008.)	Norðragøta	6	3
TB	Tvøroyri	5	4
EB/Streymur	Streymnes	4	3
NSÍ	Runavík	3	6
VB	Vágur	1	3
B71	Sandur	1	2
ÍF	Fuglafjørður	0	6
B68	Toftir	0	2
Royn	Hvalba	0	1
LÍF	Leirvík	0	1

The clubs in italics no longer exist.
