= Havnar Bóltfelag =

Faroese association football club

- Full name: Havnar Bóltfelag
- Founded: October 1904; 122 years ago
- Ground: Gundadalur, Tórshavn
- Capacity: 5,000
- Chairman: Ransin N. Djurhuus
- Manager: Łukasz Cieślewicz (caretaker)
- League: Faroe Islands Premier League
- 2025: Faroe Islands Premier League, 2nd of 10
- Website: https://hb.fo/
Home colours	Away colours

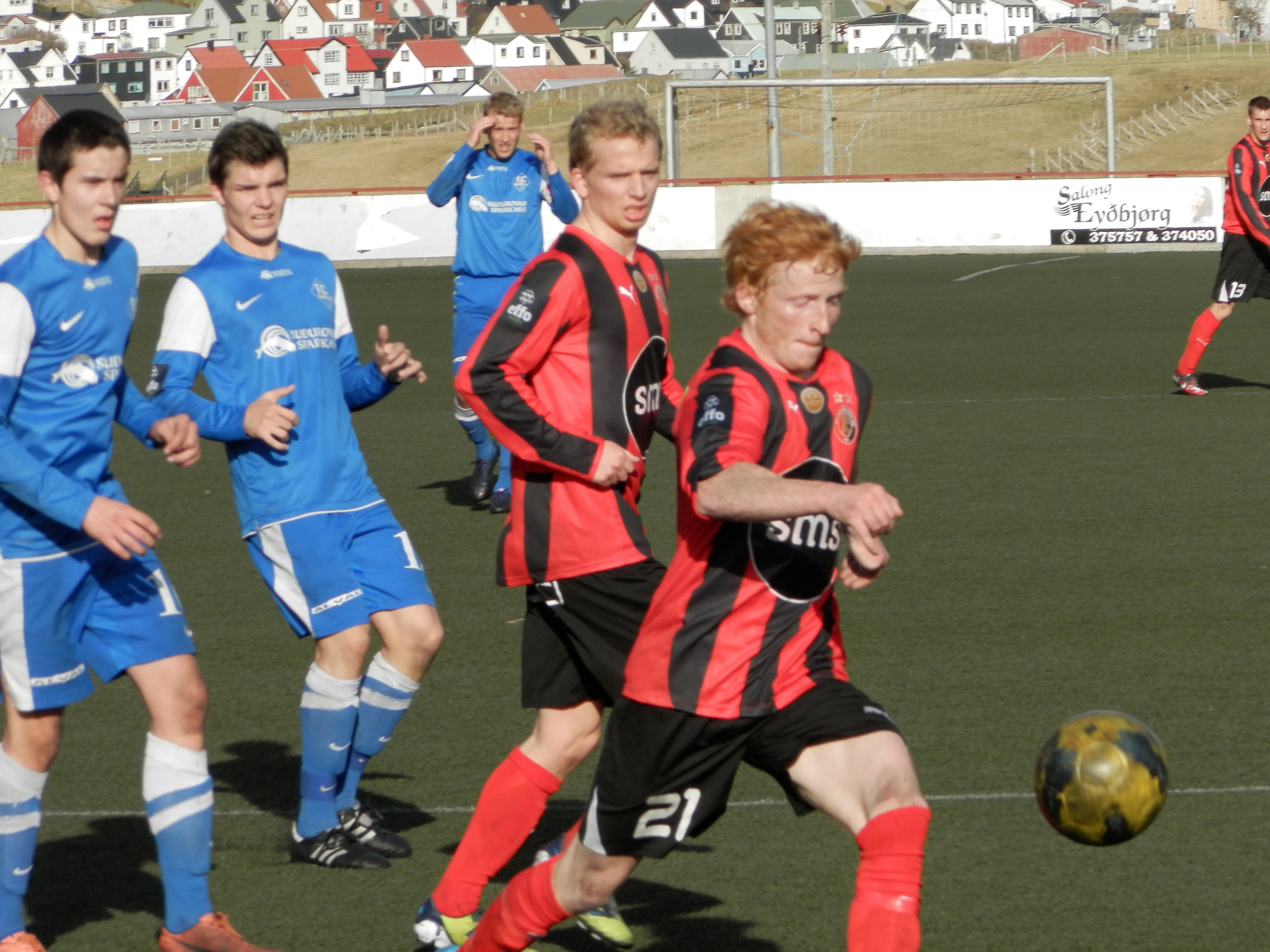
HB Tórshavn against Suðuroy on 23 September 2012

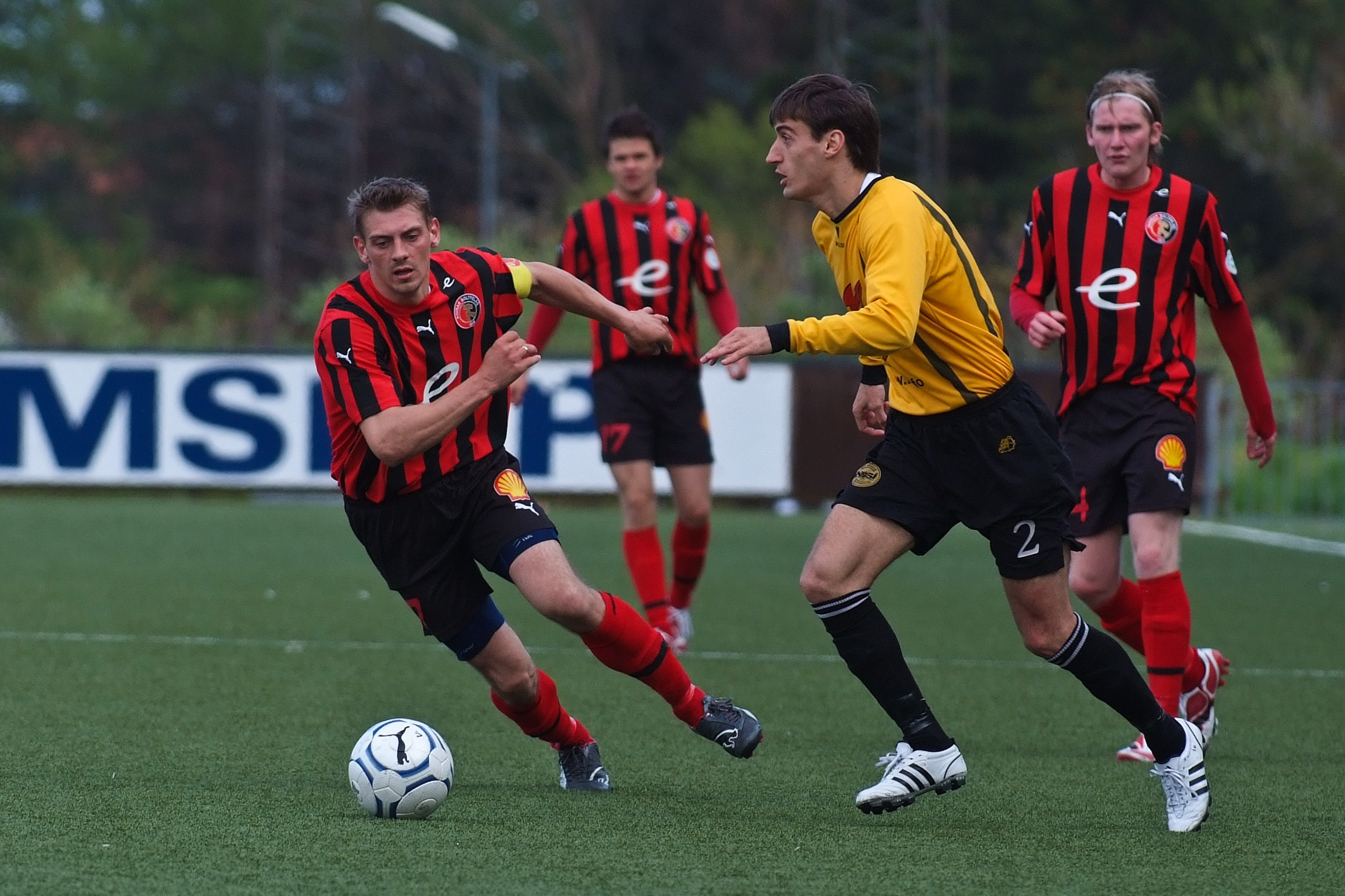
HB Tórshavn against NSÍ Runavík in 2008. Fróði Benjaminsen is to the left.

Havnar Bóltfelag (HB, lit. 'Harbour Football Club') is a Faroese professional football club, and is one of the oldest in the Faroe Islands. The club was founded in 1904, and is based in the city of Tórshavn. Home matches are played in Gundadalur and they compete in the Faroe Islands Premier League. The full name of the club is "Havnar Bóltfelag Tórshavn", which means "Port Football Club". The club was founded by port workers.

== History ==
HB Tórshavn was founded in October 1904. The club's first board was elected in a meeting, on 14 November 1904. The board consisted of three people: Mads Andrias Winther, Joan Pauli Joensen and Jakup Mouritsen. The future mayor of Tórshavn (1909–12), Mads Andrias Winther, was HB's first chairman. HB's first match against TB Tvøroyri took place on 23 May 1909, in Tvøroyri. The match ended in a 2–2 draw. Two months later, on 18 July 1909, a second match was organized against TB Tvøroyri, this time held in Tórshavn. HB won the match 3–1. The first match against future rivals KÍ Klaksvík was held on 16 July 1911, which finished in a 3–3 draw.

In 1942, a national league was formed in the Faroe Islands. The first few seasons weren't very successful for HB. Later their results improved and they finished runners-up in 1948, 1949, 1953 and 1954. Then in 1955, HB won the double, by winning the league and the first ever national cup competition, beating KÍ Klaksvík in the final. HB went on to win many more trophies; despite this by 1970, KÍ Klaksvík were the most successful club in the Faroe Islands at the time. That year HB were due to play KÍ Klaksvík in the national cup final. But the final never took place, as KÍ refused to play the final in Tórshavn. HB was not named the winners of the cup that year, even though KÍ failed to appear. HB were the current holders at the time, after beating B36 Tórshavn in the cup final, the previous year. They finished runners-up in 1970 after KÍ Klaksvík won their 5th title in a row. It was the fourth time HB had finished runners-up in the league in the past 4 seasons. The following year it was HB v TB in the cup final, the match went ahead this time and HB won. In the final round of the league there was fighting in the match between HB and KÍ players. HB were the eventual winners of the league and KÍ finished runners-up. HB also won the cup in 1972 and 1973, making them 11 times winners, and winning the cup for 5 consecutive years. They also won the cup 5 times in a row, in the years between 1978 and 1982. HB are the only club in the Faroe Islands to achieve this, with other clubs only having won the cup 2 years consecutively. By this time they had won the Faroe Islands Cup many more times than all other clubs in the Faroe Islands, but KÍ still held the most league titles.

In 1992, clubs in the Faroe Islands took part in European competitions for the first time, after the Faroe Islands Football Association became a member of UEFA a couple of years earlier. HB Tórshavn made their European debut in 1993 against RAF Jelgava in the Cup Winners Cup qualifying round. HB lost the first leg 0–1 away from home, but due to problems with their travel to the Faroe Islands the opponents did not show up for the return leg and HB were awarded a 3–0 win. HB advanced into the first round, but were knocked out by FC U Craiova of Romania. This would turn out to be the only time HB Torshavn or any other Faroese club managed to get through the qualifying round(s) of any European Club Competition to date (June 2018). Since then HB has been involved in European competitions every season except for 2002–03 and 2012–13.

In 2003, HB won the league and equalled KÍ Klaksvík's record of 17 league titles. A year later HB won the league again and bettered KÍ's record, making HB Tórshavn the most successful team in the Faroe Islands, as they had now won the most national cups and won the most league titles.

HB won the league in 2013 and participated in the 2014–15 UEFA Champions League.

In November 2017, HB hired Heimir Guðjónsson, who had previously guided Fimleikafélag Hafnarfjarðar to five Icelandic championships, as manager. On 23 September 2018 the club won the Faroe Islands Premier League after defeating second placed KÍ, 2–1. With the victory, no team could catch HB even with four matches remaining.

== Current squad ==
As of 5 July 2026

Note: Flags indicate national team as defined under FIFA eligibility rules; some limited exceptions apply. Players may hold more than one non-FIFA nationality.

No.	Pos.	Nation	Player
1	GK	FRO	Bjarti Mørk
2	DF	FRO	Rúni Kjærbo
3	DF	NOR	Per-Magnus Steiring
4	MF	FRO	Heðin Hansen
5	MF	FRO	Noah Mneney
6	DF	FRO	Áki Johannesen
7	DF	DEN	Mathias Voss
8	MF	FRO	Dan í Soylu
9	MF	FRO	Heini Sørensen
11	MF	FRO	Ási Pálsson Dam
13	GK	FRO	Tróndur Sjúrdarson
15	DF	FRO	Heri Mohr
17	DF	FRO	Bartal Wardum (captain)

No.	Pos.	Nation	Player
18	MF	FRO	Stefan Radosavljevic
20	FW	NGR	Moses Ebiye
21	DF	FRO	Ejvind Restorff Mouritsen
22	DF	FRO	Ári Jónsson
23	FW	FRO	Jákup Thomsen
24	DF	FRO	Silas B. Joensen
25	FW	NOR	Storm Bugge Pettersen
26	DF	FRO	Jónas Gaard
27	MF	FRO	Jógvan í Skála
28	MF	SEN	Amidou Diop
29	FW	FRO	Dánial Mørkøre
30	DF	FRO	Jógvan í Lon

=== Out on loan ===
Note: Flags indicate national team as defined under FIFA eligibility rules; some limited exceptions apply. Players may hold more than one non-FIFA nationality.

No. / Pos. / Nation / Player	No. / Pos. / Nation / Player

== Notable former players ==
Former players who have played for a national team and/or for a fully pro league.

- (Denmark) Heine Fernandez
- (Faroe Islands) Uni Arge
- (Faroe Islands) Jan Dam
- (Faroe Islands) Jón Rói Jacobsen
- (Faroe Islands) Rógvi Jacobsen
- (Faroe Islands) Kaj Leo Johannesen
- (Faroe Islands) Julian Johnsson
- (Faroe Islands) Vagnur Mohr Mortensen
- (Faroe Islands) Gunnar Nielsen
- (Faroe Islands) Andrew av Fløtum

== Coaches ==
- (Denmark) Ole Skouboe (1983–84)
- (Faroe Islands) Sverri Jacobsen (1984)
- (Faroe Islands) Jóhan Nielsen (1987–89)
- (Faroe Islands) Jógvan Nordbúð (1990–91)
- (Faroe Islands) Sverri Jacobsen (1992–93)
- (Faroe Islands) Jóannes Jakobsen (1994–95)
- (Faroe Islands) Jóhan Nielsen (1996–97)
- (Faroe Islands) Oddbjørn Joensen (11 June 1997 – 31 December 1997)
- (Romania) Ion Geolgău (1997–02)
- (Faroe Islands) Jóannes Jakobsen & Kári Nielsen (2002)
- (Denmark) Frank Skytte (1 January 2003 – 31 December 2003)
- (Denmark) Heine Fernandez (2004–05)
- (Faroe Islands) Julian Frank Hansen (2005)
- (Poland) Krzysztof Popczyński (1 January 2006 – 27 June 2007)
- (Faroe Islands) Heðin Askham (interim) (1 July 2007 – 31 July 2007)
- (Faroe Islands) Albert Ellefsen (2007)
- (Faroe Islands) Rúni Nolsøe (2008)
- (Faroe Islands) Rúni Nolsøe & Sámal Erik Hentze (1 August 2008 – 31 December 2009)
- (Iceland) Kristján Guðmundsson (1 January 2010 – 30 September 2010)
- (Faroe Islands) Julian Hansen (19 September 2010 – 18 June 2011)
- (Faroe Islands) Sigfríður Clementsen (1 June 2011 – 31 December 2012)
- (Faroe Islands) Oddbjørn Joensen and Fróði Benjaminsen (1 January 2013 – 31 December 2013)
- (Faroe Islands) Heðin Askham (1 January 2014 – 7 August 2015)
- (Iceland) Heimir Guðjónsson (3 November 2017 – 2019)
- (Denmark) Jens Berthel Askou (1 December 2019 – 4 January 2021)
- (Denmark) Jonas Dal (9 January 2021 – 22 June 2021)
- (Germany) Kevin Schindler & (Faroe Islands) Allan Dybczak (4 August 2021 – 10 January 2022)
- (Denmark) Kim Engstrøm (11 January 2022 – 15 May 2022)
- (Serbia) Dalibor Savić (16 May 2022 – 27 April 2023)
- (Faroe Islands) Jákup Martin Joensen (27 April 2023 – November 2023)
- (Italy) Adolfo Sormani (November 2023 – May 2025)
- (Faroe Islands) André Olsen (May 2025 – June 2026)
- (Poland) Łukasz Cieślewicz (caretaker) (June 2026 – present)

== Honours ==
- Faroe Islands Premier League
  - Champions (24): 1955, 1960, 1963, 1964, 1965, 1971, 1973, 1974, 1975, 1978, 1981, 1982, 1988, 1990, 1998, 2002, 2003, 2004, 2006, 2009, 2010, 2013, 2018, 2020
- Faroe Islands Cup
  - Winners (30): 1955, 1957, 1959, 1962, 1963, 1964, 1968, 1969, 1971, 1972, 1973, 1975, 1976, 1978, 1979, 1980, 1981, 1982, 1984, 1987, 1988, 1989, 1992, 1995, 1998, 2004, 2019, 2020, 2023, 2024
- Faroe Islands Super Cup
  - Winners (6): 2009, 2010, 2019, 2021, 2024, 2025

== Records ==
- Biggest league win: HB vs. ÍF Fuglafjørður 14–1 (1971)
- Biggest league defeat: HB vs. B36 Tórshavn 0–10 (1945)
- Biggest cup win: HB vs. Skansin Tórshavn (Division 4) 22–0 (1995)
- Biggest cup defeat: TB Tvøroyri vs. HB 6–2 (1977)
- Biggest European cup win: HB vs. (Montenegro) Budućnost Podgorica 4–0 (2021) UEFA Europa Conference League
- Biggest European defeat: (Norway) Tromsø vs. HB 10–0 (1995) Intertoto Cup

== UEFA club competition record ==
Competition	Pld	W	D	L	GF	GA
UEFA Champions League	21	3	5	13	19	52
UEFA Cup / UEFA Europa League	17	1	4	12	11	41
UEFA Europa Conference League	14	4	3	7	12	19
UEFA Cup Winners' Cup	8	1	1	6	4	24
UEFA Intertoto Cup	10	0	4	6	4	30
TOTAL	70	9	17	44	50	166

=== Matches ===
Season	Competition	Round	Opponent	Home	Away	Aggregate
1993–94	UEFA Cup Winners' Cup	QR	(Latvia) RAF Jelgava	3–0 (Note: Awarded by UEFA after RAF Jelgava failed to appear.)	0–1	3–1
1993–94	UEFA Cup Winners' Cup	1R	(Romania) Universitatea Craiova	0–3	0–4	0–7
1994–95	UEFA Cup	PR	(Scotland) Motherwell	1–4	0–3	1–7
1995	UEFA Intertoto Cup	Group 3	(Romania) Universitatea Cluj	0–0	—N/a	4th
1995	UEFA Intertoto Cup	Group 3	(Norway) Tromsø	—N/a	0–10	4th
1995	UEFA Intertoto Cup	Group 3	(Belgium) Germinal Ekeren	1–1	—N/a	4th
1995	UEFA Intertoto Cup	Group 3	(Switzerland) Aarau	—N/a	1–6	4th
1996–97	UEFA Cup Winners' Cup	QR	(Georgia (country)) Dinamo Batumi	0–3	0–6	0–9
1997–98	UEFA Cup Winners' Cup	QR	(Cyprus) APOEL	1–1	0–6	1–7
1998–99	UEFA Cup	1Q	(Finland) VPS Vaasa	2–0	0–4	2–4
1999–00	UEFA Champions League	QR	(Finland) Haka	1–1	0–6	1–7
2000	UEFA Intertoto Cup	1R	(Hungary) Tatabánya	0–4	0–3	0–7
2001–02	UEFA Cup	QR	(Austria) Grazer AK	2–2	0–4	2–6
2003–04	UEFA Champions League	1Q	(Lithuania) FBK Kaunas	0–1	1–4	1–5
2004–05	UEFA Champions League	1Q	(Georgia (country)) WIT Georgia	3–0	0–5	3–5
2005–06	UEFA Champions League	1Q	(Lithuania) FBK Kaunas	2–4	0–4	2–8
2006	UEFA Intertoto Cup	1R	(Latvia) Dinaburg	0–1	1–1	1–2
2007–08	UEFA Champions League	1Q	(Iceland) FH Hafnarfjörður	0–0	1–4	1–4
2008	UEFA Intertoto Cup	1R	(Sweden) IF Elfsborg	1–4	0–0	1–4
2009–10	UEFA Europa League	2Q	(Cyprus) Omonia	1–4	0–4	1–8
2010–11	UEFA Champions League	2Q	(Austria) Red Bull Salzburg	1–0	0–5	1–5
2011–12	UEFA Champions League	2Q	(Sweden) Malmö FF	1–1	0–2	1–3
2013–14	UEFA Europa League	1Q	(Iceland) ÍBV	0–1	1–1	1–2
2014–15	UEFA Champions League	1Q	(Gibraltar) Lincoln Red Imps	5–2	1–1	6–3
2014–15	UEFA Champions League	2Q	(Serbia) Partizan	1–3	0–3	1–6
2015–16	UEFA Europa League	1Q	(Lithuania) Trakai	1–4	0–3	1–7
2016–17	UEFA Europa League	1Q	(Estonia) Levadia Tallinn	0–2	1–1	1–3
2019–20	UEFA Champions League	1Q	(Finland) HJK Helsinki	2–2	0–3	2–5
2019–20	UEFA Europa League	2Q	(Northern Ireland) Linfield	2–2	0–1	2–3
2020–21	UEFA Europa League	PR	(Northern Ireland) Glentoran	—N/a	0–1	—N/a
2021–22	UEFA Champions League	PR	(Andorra) Inter Club d'Escaldes	0–1		
2021–22	UEFA Europa Conference League	2Q	(Montenegro) Budućnost Podgorica	4–0	2–0	6–0
2021–22	UEFA Europa Conference League	3Q	(Israel) Maccabi Haifa	1–0	2–7	3–7
2022–23	UEFA Europa Conference League	1Q	(Wales) Newtown	1–0	1–2 (a.e.t.)	2–2 (2–4 p)
2023–24	UEFA Europa Conference League	1Q	(Republic of Ireland) Derry City	0–0	0–1	0−1
2024–25	UEFA Conference League	2Q	(Croatia) Hajduk Split	0–0	0–2	0–2
2025–26	UEFA Conference League	2Q	(Denmark) Brøndby	1–1	0–1	1–2
2026–27	UEFA Conference League	2Q	(Scotland) Motherwell	0–3	0–2	0–5
2027–28	UEFA Conference League	1Q				

Notes

- PR: Preliminary round
- 1R: First round
- QR: Qualifying round
- 1Q: First qualifying round
- 2Q: Second qualifying round
