= 2014 1. deild =

1. deild
- Season: 2014
- Dates: 15 March - 4 October 2014
- Champions: Tvøroyrar Bóltfelag; 3rd title
- Promoted: Tvøroyrar Bóltfelag; FC Suðuroy
- Relegated: Havnar Bóltfelag II; EB/Streymur II
- Matches played: 135
- Goals scored: 495 (3.67 per match)
- Top goalscorer: Patrik Johannesen (17 goals)
- Biggest home win: B36 Tórshavn II 8-1 Klaksvíkar Ítróttarfelag II (29 March 2014); Argja Bóltfelag II 7-0 Víkingur Gøta II (11 June 2014)
- Biggest away win: Víkingur Gøta II 0-7 Tvøroyrar Bóltfelag (21 June 2014)
- Highest scoring: B36 Tórshavn II 8-1 Klaksvíkar Ítróttarfelag II (29 March 2014)

The 2014 1. deild was the 71st season of 1. deild.

Tvøroyrar Bóltfelag and FC Suðuroy got promoted to the Faroe Islands Premier League, after finishing 1st and 2nd at the end of the season.

Havnar Bóltfelag II and EB/Streymur II got relegated to 2. deild, after finishing 9th and 10th at the end of the season.

== Teams ==
Locations of the 2014 1. deild teams

A total of 10 teams participated in the 2014 edition of 1. deild.

=== Team changes ===
| Promoted from 2013 2. deild | Relegated from 2013 Faroe Islands Premier League | Promoted to 2014 Faroe Islands Premier League | Relegated to 2014 2. deild |
|---|---|---|---|
| Argja Bóltfelag II; NSÍ Runavík II | Tvøroyrar Bóltfelag; 07 Vestur | B68 Toftir; Skála Ítróttarfelag | Tvøroyrar Bóltfelag II; B71 Sandoy |

=== Stadiums and locations ===
| Team | City | Stadium | Capacity |
|---|---|---|---|
| 07 Vestur | Sørvágur | á Dungasandi | 2,000 |
| Argja Bóltfelag II | Argir | Blue Water Arena | 2,000 |
| B36 Tórshavn II | Tórshavn | Gundadalur | 5,000 |
| EB/Streymur II | Streymnes | Við Margáir | 1,000 |
| FC Suðuroy | Vágur | á Eiðinum | 3,000 |
| Havnar Bóltfelag II | Tórshavn | Gundadalur | 5,000 |
| Klaksvíkar Ítróttarfelag II | Klaksvík | Injector Arena | 2,500 |
| NSÍ Runavík II | Runavík | Við Løkin | 1,500 |
| Tvøroyrar Bóltfelag | Tvøroyri | Við Stórá | 4,000 |
| Víkingur Gøta II | Norðragøta | Sarpugerði | 1,600 |

== League table ==
| Pos | Team | Pld | W | D | L | GF | GA | GD | Pts | Promotion or Relegation |
|---|---|---|---|---|---|---|---|---|---|---|
| 1 | Tvøroyrar Bóltfelag (C, P) | 27 | 21 | 4 | 2 | 73 | 21 | +52 | 67 | Promotion to Faroe Islands Premier League |
| 2 | FC Suðuroy (P) | 27 | 14 | 6 | 7 | 54 | 34 | +20 | 48 | Promotion to Faroe Islands Premier League |
| 3 | 07 Vestur | 27 | 14 | 5 | 8 | 54 | 41 | +13 | 47 | |
| 4 | B36 Tórshavn II | 27 | 10 | 6 | 11 | 53 | 52 | +1 | 36 | |
| 5 | Argja Bóltfelag II | 27 | 9 | 8 | 10 | 49 | 46 | +3 | 35 | |
| 6 | NSÍ Runavík II | 27 | 10 | 4 | 13 | 54 | 52 | +2 | 34 | |
| 7 | Víkingur Gøta II | 27 | 9 | 7 | 11 | 41 | 51 | −10 | 34 | |
| 8 | Klaksvíkar Ítróttarfelag II | 27 | 7 | 8 | 12 | 44 | 62 | −18 | 29 | |
| 9 | Havnar Bóltfelag II (R) | 27 | 8 | 5 | 14 | 41 | 65 | −24 | 29 | Relegation to 2. deild |
| 10 | EB/Streymur II (R) | 27 | 4 | 5 | 18 | 32 | 71 | −39 | 17 | Relegation to 2. deild |

Source: Faroe Soccer
Rules for classification: 1) points; 2) goal difference; 3) number of goals scored
(C) Champions; (P) Promoted; (R) Relegated

== Results ==
=== Matches 1-18 ===
| Home \ Away | VES | AB II | B36 II | EBS II | FCS | HB II | KÍ II | NSÍ II | TB | VÍK II |
|---|---|---|---|---|---|---|---|---|---|---|
| 07 Vestur | | 0–2 | 2–0 | 3–3 | 1–0 | 3–1 | 2–0 | 2–0 | 0–2 | 3–1 |
| Argja Bóltfelag II | 3–0 | | 2–2 | 2–2 | 2–2 | 4–0 | 2–1 | 3–3 | 0–1 | 7–0 |
| B36 Tórshavn II | 5–2 | 1–0 | | 3–3 | 0–3 | 5–1 | 8–1 | 2–0 | 0–3 | 3–3 |
| EB/Streymur II | 0–2 | 2–2 | 1–4 | | 0–5 | 3–1 | 0–4 | 1–2 | 1–3 | 2–0 |
| FC Suðuroy | 2–4 | 1–2 | 5–1 | 1–0 | | 3–2 | 2–2 | 1–0 | 0–2 | 3–1 |
| Havnar Bóltfelag II | 0–4 | 2–1 | 1–2 | 1–2 | 1–0 | | 1–1 | 2–3 | 3–4 | 1–1 |
| Klaksvíkar Ítróttarfelag II | 2–2 | 3–5 | 1–1 | 3–0 | 1–2 | 0–0 | | 0–5 | 2–3 | 1–6 |
| NSÍ Runavík II | 4–2 | 3–1 | 0–2 | 5–3 | 2–4 | 7–1 | 2–1 | | 0–2 | 3–4 |
| Tvøroyrar Bóltfelag | 3–0 | 5–0 | 3–1 | 2–1 | 2–2 | 5–0 | 3–0 | 3–1 | | 1–0 |
| Víkingur Gøta II | 1–1 | 2–0 | 0–1 | 3–1 | 2–1 | 1–1 | 2–2 | 1–1 | 0–7 | |

Updated to match(es) played on 23 August 2014. Source: Faroe Soccer
Legend: Blue = home team win; Yellow = draw; Red = away team win.

=== Matches 19-27 ===
| Home \ Away | VES | AB II | B36 II | EBS II | FCS | HB II | KÍ II | NSÍ II | TB | VÍK II |
|---|---|---|---|---|---|---|---|---|---|---|
| 07 Vestur | | 2–0 | | | 1–1 | 1–2 | 1–2 | 2–1 | | |
| Argja Bóltfelag II | | | | | 0–1 | 3–2 | 0–4 | | 0–0 | |
| B36 Tórshavn II | 2–4 | 0–0 | | | 1–5 | | 2–3 | 3–0 | | |
| EB/Streymur II | 1–6 | 2–5 | 2–2 | | | | | 1–2 | | 1–0 |
| FC Suðuroy | | | | 1–0 | | | | 3–1 | 0–0 | 2–1 |
| Havnar Bóltfelag II | | | 2–0 | 2–0 | 1–0 | | | 2–2 | 3–1 | 3–2 |
| Klaksvíkar Ítróttarfelag II | | | | 2–0 | 1–1 | 4–2 | | 1–1 | | |
| NSÍ Runavík II | | 3–1 | | | | | | | 0–3 | 1–2 |
| Tvøroyrar Bóltfelag | 2–2 | | 3–2 | 3–1 | | | 7–1 | | | 0–1 |
| Víkingur Gøta II | 1–2 | 2–2 | 2–0 | | | | 2–1 | | | |

Updated to match(es) played on 4 October 2014. Source: Faroe Soccer
Legend: Blue = home team win; Yellow = draw; Red = away team win.

== Top goalscorers ==
| Rank | Player | Team | Goals |
|---|---|---|---|
| 1 | (Faroe Islands) Patrik Johannesen | FC Suðuroy/Tvøroyrar Bóltfelag | 17 |
| 2 | (Faroe Islands) Debes Danielsen | NSÍ Runavík II | 16 |
| 2 | (Faroe Islands) Meinhard Olsen | NSÍ Runavík II | 16 |
| 2 | (Faroe Islands) Ragnar Tausen | Tvøroyrar Bóltfelag | 16 |
| 5 | (Faroe Islands) Jón Krosslá Poulsen | FC Suðuroy | 15 |

== See also ==
- 2014 Faroe Islands Premier League
- 2014 Faroe Islands Cup
