= 2020 1. deild =

1. deild
- Season: 2020
- Dates: 7 March – 5 November
- Champions: Víkingur Gøta II
- Promoted: 07 Vestur; B68 Toftir
- Relegated: Argja Bóltfelag II; FC Hoyvík
- Top goalscorer: Andri Benjaminsen (18 goals)

The 2020 1. deild was the 78th season of second-tier football in the Faroe Islands, and the 44th under the current format. Víkingur Gøta II won the league, but could not be promoted because the club already had a team in the Faroe Islands Premier League. 07 Vestur won promotion after the regular season. B68 Toftir which ended as 4th after the regular season played a promotion/relegation match against Argja Bóltfelag on 29 November 2020. B68 Toftir won the away match 2-3 with hat trick from Andri Benjaminsen, who is a young brother of record player of the Faroe Islands national football team Fróði Benjaminsen. The match ended 1-1 after 90 minutes, and after prolonged time B68 won with 3 goals against AB's 2 goals.

== Teams ==
Locations of the 2020 Faroe Islands Premier League teams

Skála ÍF II and EB/Streymur II were relegated last season to the 2. deild and replaced by the winners and runners-up FC Hoyvík and Argja Bóltfelag II respectively.

Team	City	Stadium	Capacity	Last season
07 Vestur	Sandavágur	Á Dungasandi	2,000	4th
Argja Bóltfelag II	Argir	Inni í Vika	2,000	2nd (2. deild)
B36 Tórshavn II	Tórshavn	Gundadalur	5,000	6th
B68 Toftir	Toftir	Svangaskarð	6,000	5th
B71 Sandoy	Sandur	Inni í Dal	2,000	7th
Havnar Bóltfelag II	Tórshavn	Gundadalur	5,000	8th
FC Hoyvík	Hoyvík	Hoyvíksvøllur	1,000	1st (2. deild)
KÍ II	Klaksvík	Við Djúpumýrar	2,500	1st
NSÍ Runavík II	Runavík	Við Løkin	2,000	3rd
Víkingur Gøta II	Leirvík	Sarpugerði	1,600	2nd

== League table ==
Pos	Team	Pld	W	D	L	GF	GA	GD	Pts	Promotion, qualification or relegation
1	Víkingur Gøta II (C)	27	17	7	3	73	36	+37	58	Ineligble for promotion as a league below main team
2	07 Vestur (P)	27	16	6	5	60	33	+27	54	Promotion to the Faroe Islands Premier League
3	NSÍ Runavík II	27	15	7	5	80	42	+38	52	Ineligble for promotion as a league below main team
4	B68 Toftir (O, P)	27	14	4	9	56	34	+22	46	Qualification for the Faroe Islands Premier League play-off
5	KÍ II	27	11	5	11	56	54	+2	38	
6	B36 Tórshavn II	27	10	4	13	43	53	−10	34	
7	HB Tórshavn II	27	10	3	14	53	79	−26	33	
8	B71 Sandoy	27	9	5	13	53	52	+1	32	
9	Argja Bóltfelag II (R)	27	6	5	16	35	58	−23	23	Relegation to the 2. deild
10	Hoyvík (R)	27	2	4	21	29	97	−68	10	Relegation to the 2. deild

Updated to match(es) played on 15 July 2020. Source: Soccerway
Rules for classification: 1) Points; 2) Goal difference; 3) Goals scored.
(C) Champions; (O) Play-off winners; (P) Promoted; (R) Relegated

== Results ==
Each team plays three times (either twice at home and once away or once at home and twice away) against every other team for a total of 27 matches each.

=== Rounds 1–18 ===
Home \ Away	07V	ABA	B36	B68	B71	HBI	HOY	KÍI	NSÍ	VIK
07 Vestur		2–0		1–2	0–3	3–3	3–0			2–2
Argja Bóltfelag II			1–2	2–5	2–1	1–2		0–2	2–3	
B36	1–2			0–1	3–1		3–1	2–1		
B68			1–1			2–2	6–0	0–2	2–2	
B71	1–1			2–1		4–2		1–2		1–3
HB II	4–1		6–1		1–1					0–2
FC Hoyvík				0–3	1–2	1–2		2–0	4–4	1–3
KÍ II	1–0	3–2	2–0			1–3	2–2			2–2
NSÍ II	0–0		3–0		4–3	2–0		6–2		2–4
Víkingur II	1–1			2–1			5–0		0–0	

Updated to match(es) played on 15 July 2020. Source: Soccerway
Legend: Blue = home team win; Yellow = draw; Red = away team win.

=== Rounds 19–27 ===
Home \ Away	07V	ABA	B36	B38	B71	HBI	HOY	KÍI	NSÍ	VIK
07 Vestur										
Argja Bóltfelag II										
B36 Tórshavn II										
B38 Toftir										
B71 Sandoy										
HB Tórshavn II										
FC Hoyvík										
KÍ II										
NSÍ Runavík										
VIK										

Updated to match(es) played on pre-season. Source: Soccerway
Legend: Blue = home team win; Yellow = draw; Red = away team win.

== See also ==
- 2020 Faroe Islands Premier League
- 2020 Faroe Islands Cup
- 2020 2. deild
