= 2025 1. deild =

1. deild
- Season: 2025
- Dates: 7 March – 25 October 2025
- Champions: Skála
- Promoted: AB; Skála
- Relegated: KÍ II; 07 Vestur II

The 2025 1. deild was the 83rd season of second-tier football in the Faroe Islands, and the 49th under the current format.

== Teams ==
The league consisted of ten teams; six teams remaining from the previous season, two teams promoted from the 2. deild, and two teams relegated from the Faroe Islands Premier League.

The promoted teams were the 2024 2. deild champions 07 Vestur II and third-placed team EB/Streymur II (runners-up Víkingur Gøta III were ineligible for promotion). They replaced the 2024 1. deild bottom two teams Hoyvík and HB II.

The relegated teams were the 2024 Faroe Islands Premier League bottom two teams Skála and ÍF. They replaced the 2024 1. deild second and third-placed teams Suðuroy and TB.

Locations of the 2025 1.deild teams

Team	City	Stadium	Capacity
AB	Argir	Inni í Vika	2,000
B36 Tórshavn II	Tórshavn	Gundadalur	5,000
B71 Sandoy	Sandur	Inni í Dal	2,000
EB/Streymur II	Streymnes	Við Margáir	2,000
ÍF	Fuglafjørður	Í Fløtugerði	3,000
KÍ II	Klaksvík	Við Djúpumýrar	2,500
NSÍ Runavík II	Runavík	Við Løkin	2,000
Skála ÍF	Skála	Undir Mýruhjalla	2,000
07 Vestur II	Sørvágur	Á Dungasandi	2,000
Víkingur Gøta II	Leirvík	Sarpugerði	1,600

== League table ==
Pos	Team	Pld	W	D	L	GF	GA	GD	Pts	Promotion or relegation
1	Skála (C, P)	27	23	3	1	96	14	+82	72	Promotion to the Faroe Islands Premier League
2	AB (P)	27	22	3	2	64	16	+48	69	Promotion to the Faroe Islands Premier League
3	B71	27	18	2	7	58	36	+22	56	
4	Víkingur Gøta II	27	12	3	12	56	45	+11	39	
5	ÍF	27	11	4	12	55	54	+1	37	
6	B36 II	27	8	6	13	37	53	−16	30	
7	EB/Streymur II	27	9	1	17	29	77	−48	28	
8	NSÍ II	27	8	3	16	52	63	−11	27	
9	KÍ II (R)	27	8	2	17	33	61	−28	26	Relegation to the 2. deild
10	07 Vestur II (R)	27	2	1	24	21	82	−61	7	Relegation to the 2. deild

Source: Soccerway
Rules for classification: 1) Points; 2) Goal difference; 3) Goals scored.
(C) Champions; (P) Promoted; (R) Relegated

== Results ==
Each team plays three times (either twice at home and once away or once at home and twice away) against every other team for a total of 27 matches each.

Home \ Away	ABA	B36	B71	EBS	ÍF	KÍI	NSÍ	SKA	VES	VÍK	ABA	B36	B71	EBS	ÍF	KÍI	NSÍ	SKA	VES	VÍK
AB	—	2–1	4–0	1–3	1–1	5–1	2–1	0–1	2–1	3–0	—	1–0	2–1	5–0	4–1	3–0	—	—	—	—
B36 II	1–2	—	3–0	1–3	2–2	2–0	0–5	0–5	1–1	3–3	—	—	—	—	1–0	—	3–2	1–4	1–0	—
B71	1–2	2–1	—	2–0	2–1	2–1	2–0	1–0	3–0	0–2	—	1–1	—	4–2	3–0	—	5–2	—	7–1	—
EB/Streymur II	0–5	3–1	0–1	—	2–5	1–0	2–1	0–3	2–1	0–8	—	1–1	—	—	2–1	—	1–7	—	3–1	—
ÍF	1–3	3–1	1–3	6–0	—	4–0	3–2	1–2	2–1	1–3	—	—	—	—	—	—	3–1	1–5	2–0	1–1
KÍ II	0–3	1–0	0–1	2–1	2–3	—	3–0	5–5	3–1	3–1	—	1–2	1–2	2–0	3–1	—	—	—	1–0	—
NSÍ II	1–2	1–1	2–4	3–0	3–3	2–2	—	0–4	1–0	1–2	0–2	—	—	—	—	2–0	—	0–9	—	2–3
Skála	0–0	4–1	3–1	8–0	3–1	2–0	3–0	—	4–0	3–0	0–0	—	2–1	4–0	—	7–0	—	—	—	5–0
07 Vestur II	0–1	0–7	0–3	1–0	3–4	5–2	2–3	0–4	—	2–3	0–4	—	—	—	—	—	1–8	0–4	—	0–3
Víkingur Gøta II	0–2	5–0	2–3	0–1	1–3	3–1	1–2	1–2	4–0	—	1–2	0–1	3–3	3–2	—	3–0	—	—	—	—

Source: Soccerway
Legend: Blue = home team win; Yellow = draw; Red = away team win.
