= 2025 Faroe Islands Premier League =

Faroe Islands Premier League
- Season: 2025
- Dates: 7 March 2025 – 25 October 2025
- Champions: KÍ (22nd title)
- Relegated: Suðuroy; TB
- Champions League: KÍ
- Conference League: HB; NSÍ; Víkingur
- Matches: 135
- Goals: 490 (3.63 per match)
- Top goalscorer: Klæmint Olsen (26 goals)
- Biggest home win: NSÍ 11–0 B68 (30 March 2025)
- Biggest away win: HB 1–7 NSÍ (3 May 2025); Suðuroy 1–7 NSÍ (17 May 2025)
- Highest scoring: NSÍ 11–0 B68 (30 March 2025)
- Longest winning run: KÍ (9 matches)
- Longest unbeaten run: KÍ (27 matches)
- Longest winless run: TB/ Suðuroy(10 matches)
- Longest losing run: Suðuroy (10 matches)
- Highest attendance: 2000; B36 0–2 TB (28 July 2025)
- Lowest attendance: 50; Suðuroy 2–3 B36 (31 May 2025)
- Average attendance: 422 (Note: Data is approximate; attendance figures for 23 matches are not available.)

The 2025 Faroe Islands Premier League was the 83rd edition of top-tier football in the Faroe Islands, and the 20th under the current format. The season ran in 2025 from 7 March until 25 October.

== Teams ==
The league consisted of ten teams; the top eight teams from the previous season, and two teams promoted from the 1. deild. Víkingur entered the season as defending champions.

The promoted teams were the 2024 1. deild runners-up Suðuroy and third-placed team TB (champions Víkingur II were ineligible for promotion). They replaced the 2024 Faroe Islands Premier League bottom two teams Skála and ÍF.

Locations of the 2025 Faroe Islands Premier League teams

Team	City	Stadium	Capacity
B36 Tórshavn	Tórshavn	Gundadalur	5,000
B68 Toftir	Toftir	Svangaskarð	6,000
EB/Streymur	Eiði	í Hólmanum	2,000
Havnar Bóltfelag	Tórshavn	Gundadalur	5,000
KÍ	Klaksvík	Við Djúpumýrar	4,000
NSÍ Runavík	Runavík	Við Løkin	2,000
Suðuroy	Vágur	á Eiðinum Stadium	3,000
07 Vestur	Sørvágur	Á Dungasandi	2,000
TB	Tvøroyri	Við Stórá	4,000
Víkingur	Norðragøta	Sarpugerði	3,000

== League table ==
Pos	Team	Pld	W	D	L	GF	GA	GD	Pts	Qualification or relegation
1	KÍ (C)	27	23	4	0	92	18	+74	73	Qualification for the Champions League first qualifying round
2	HB	27	20	4	3	70	35	+35	64	Qualification for the Conference League second qualifying round (Note: The 2025 Faroe Islands Cup winners qualified for the Conference League second qualifying round. Since the cup winners (KÍ) qualified based on league position, the Conference League second qualifying round spot was passed to the second-placed team, and the second Conference League first qualifying round spot was passed to the fourth-placed team.)
3	NSÍ	27	19	3	5	92	37	+55	60	Qualification for the Conference League first qualifying round
4	Víkingur	27	12	8	7	42	29	+13	44	Qualification for the Conference League first qualifying round
5	B36	27	12	6	9	45	39	+6	42	
6	B68	27	6	8	13	35	61	−26	26	
7	EB/Streymur	27	6	8	13	30	58	−28	26	
8	07 Vestur	27	4	3	20	34	54	−20	15	
9	Suðuroy (R)	27	4	3	20	25	71	−46	15	Relegation to the 1. deild
10	TB (R)	27	2	7	18	25	88	−63	13	Relegation to the 1. deild

Source: Soccerway
Rules for classification: 1) Points; 2) Goal difference; 3) Goals scored.
(C) Champions; (R) Relegated

== Results ==
Teams play each other three times (either twice at home and once away or once at home and twice away) for a total of 27 matches each.

Home \ Away	B36	EBS	HAV	KÍ	NSI	SUÐ	TBÓ	TOF	VES	VÍK	B36	EBS	HAV	KÍ	NSI	SUÐ	TBÓ	TOF	VES	VÍK
B36 Tórshavn	—	1–2	2–2	1–3	2–2	1–0	0–2	1–1	3–1	1–0	—	0–0	—	0–3	—	2–0	—	1–0	—	1–1
EB/Streymur	1–3	—	0–3	0–3	0–5	2–1	2–2	1–0	1–0	1–2	—	—	0–4	—	1–3	—	2–2	0–2	—	—
Havnar Bóltfelag	2–3	2–1	—	1–1	1–7	4–0	3–2	3–2	3–0	2–1	2–2	—	—	—	3–0	2–1	4–1	5–1	—	—
KÍ	2–1	2–1	4–0	—	3–2	4–0	10–0	7–0	3–1	2–0	—	6–2	0–0	—	—	—	6–0	—	—	0–0
NSÍ Runavík	4–3	4–0	1–4	1–2	—	1–0	3–0	11–0	4–1	1–1	2–1	—	—	2–4	—	3–1	—	—	1–0	—
Suðuroy	2–3	0–2	1–2	0–4	1–7	—	1–0	0–3	4–3	0–2	—	2–2	—	2–6	—	—	—	—	0–3	0–4
TB	0–1	1–1	2–7	0–5	1–5	2–3	—	1–1	2–1	1–1	0–5	—	—	—	2–6	2–2	—	1–1	—	0–3
B68 Toftir	2–1	2–2	1–4	0–2	1–3	2–0	4–1	—	2–1	0–1	—	—	—	3–3	1–3	1–1	—	—	1–1	2–2
07 Vestur	1–3	0–1	1–2	0–4	1–5	1–2	5–0	3–1	—	1–2	0–1	3–3	1–2	1–2	—	—	3–0	—	—	—
Víkingur	4–2	4–1	0–1	0–1	0–3	3–1	3–0	2–1	0–0	—	—	1–1	0–2	—	3–3	—	—	—	2–1	—

Source: Soccerway
Legend: Blue = home team win; Yellow = draw; Red = away team win.
For upcoming matches, an "a" indicates there is an article about the rivalry between the two participants.

== Season statistics ==
=== Top scorers ===
Rank	Player	Club	Goals
1	(Faroe Islands) Klæmint Andrasson Olsen	NSÍ	26
2	(Faroe Islands) Páll Klettskarð	KÍ	21
3	(Norway) Emil Grønn Pedersen	HB	20
4	(Faroe Islands) Árni Frederiksberg	KÍ	18
5	(Faroe Islands) Petur Knudsen	NSÍ	11
5	(Faroe Islands) Brandur Hendriksson	NSÍ	11
5	(Faroe Islands) Patrik Johannesen	KÍ	11
5	(Faroe Islands) Jákup Thomsen	HB	11
8	(Denmark) Sammy Skytte	HB	10
8	(Ghana) Samudeen Musah	TB	10

=== Hat-tricks ===
Player	For	Against	Result	Date
(Faroe Islands) Petur Knudsen	NSÍ	B68	11–0 (H)	30 March 2025
(Faroe Islands) Klæmint Andrasson Olsen	NSÍ	07 Vestur	4–1 (H)	3 April 2025
(Faroe Islands) Brandur Hendriksson	NSÍ	EB/Streymur	0–5 (A)	26 April 2025
(Faroe Islands) Patrik Johannesen	KÍ	TB	10–0 (H)	1 May 2025
(Faroe Islands) Páll Klettskarð	KÍ	TB	10–0 (H)	1 May 2025
(Faroe Islands) Petur Knudsen	NSÍ	HB	1–7 (A)	3 May 2025
(Faroe Islands) Klæmint Andrasson Olsen	NSÍ	HB	1–7 (A)	3 May 2025
(Faroe Islands) Poul Kallsberg	Víkingur	Suðuroy	3–1 (H)	25 May 2025
(Faroe Islands) Árni Frederiksberg	KÍ	TB	0–5 (A)	25 May 2025
(Faroe Islands) Árni Frederiksberg	KÍ	Suðuroy	4–0 (H)	28 June 2025
(Faroe Islands) Klæmint Andrasson Olsen	NSÍ	EB/Streymur	4–0 (H)	29 June 2025
(Faroe Islands) Páll Klettskarð	KÍ	EB/Streymur	6–2 (H)	21 September 2025
(Norway) Emil Grønn Pedersen	HB	EB/Streymur	0–4 (A)	28 September 2025
(Norway) Filip Brattbakk	KÍ	TB	6–0 (H)	19 October 2025

=== Discipline ===
==== Player ====
- Most yellow cards: 9
  - (Faroe Islands) Olaf Bárðarson (Víkingur)
  - (Faroe Islands) Aron Ellingsgaard Jarnskor (Víkingur)
  - (Faroe Islands) Tóki Hammershaimb Johannesen (EB/Streymur)
  - (Faroe Islands) Virgar Jónsson (EB/Streymur)
  - (Faroe Islands) Magnus Jacobsen (B68 (6) & 07 Vestur (3))
- Most red cards: 2
  - (Faroe Islands) Ragnar Joensen (TB)
  - (Faroe Islands) Andras Olsen (EB/Streymur)

==== Club ====
- Most yellow cards: 74
  - EB/Streymur
- Most red cards: 6
  - B68
