= 2015 Faroe Islands Cup =

Løgmanssteypið

Tournament details
- Country: Faroe Islands
- Teams: 18

Final positions
- Champions: Víkingur Gøta (5th title)
- Runners-up: NSÍ Runavík

Tournament statistics
- Matches played: 19
- Goals scored: 60 (3.16 per match)
- Top goal scorer(s): (Poland) Łukasz Cieślewicz (Faroe Islands) Klæmint Olsen (4 goals each)

The 2015 Faroe Islands Cup was the 61st edition of Faroe Islands domestic football cup. It started on 28 March and ended with the final on 29 August 2015. Víkingur were the defending champions, having won their fourth cup title the previous year, and successfully defended their title, qualifying for the first qualifying round of the 2016–17 UEFA Europa League.

Only the first teams of Faroese football clubs were allowed to participate. The preliminary round involved clubs from 2. deild, 3. deild and one from 1. deild. The remaining teams from 1. deild and all of the Effodeildin entered the competition in the first round.

== Participating clubs ==
2015 Effodeildin 10 teams	2015 1. deild 5 teams	2015 2. deild 2 teams	2015 3. deild 1 team
AB; B36; EB/Streymur; FC Suðuroy; HB; ÍF; KÍ; NSÍ; TB; Víkingur ^{TH}	07 Vestur; B68; B71; MB; Skála	Giza Hoyvík; Royn	Undrið

^{TH} – Title Holders

== Round and draw dates ==
Round	Draw date	Game date
Preliminary round	9 March	28 March, 1 April
First round	9 March	6 April
Quarterfinals	13 April	22 April
Semifinals	27 April	21 May & 3–4 June
Final	—	29 August 2015 at Tórsvøllur, Tórshavn

== Preliminary round ==
Two clubs from 2. deild and 1 from 3. deild and 1. deild entered this round. The draw was made on 9 March and the matches took place on 28 March and 1 April.

Team 1	Score	Team 2
Undrið FF	0–5	Giza Hoyvík
Royn	0–1	07 Vestur

== First round ==
All ten clubs from Effodeildin, four from 1. deild and the two winners of Preliminary round entered this round. These matches were played on 6 April.

Team 1	Score	Team 2
HB	1–0	Skála
EB/Streymur	3–2	KÍ
ÍF	5–0	B71 Sandoy
Víkingur	4–0	B68
B36	2–1	TB
MB	0–3	Giza Hoyvík
NSÍ	2–1	FC Suðuroy
07 Vestur	1–2	AB

== Quarter-finals ==
The draw was made on 13 April and the matches were played on 21 and 22 April.

Team 1	Score	Team 2
B36 Tórshavn	4–0	EB/Streymur
Giza Hoyvík	1–4	HB
ÍF	3–3 (a.e.t.); 8–9 (p)	Víkingur
NSÍ	2–2 (a.e.t.); 5–4 (p)	AB

== Semi-finals ==
The draw was made on 27 April. These matches were played over two legs on 21 May, 3 June and 4 June.

Team 1	Agg.	Team 2	1st leg	2nd leg
Víkingur	2–1	B36	0–1	2–0
NSÍ	2–0	HB	1–0	1–0

== Final ==
29 August 2015
19:45 WEST

Víkingur	3–0	NSÍ
S. Olsen 10'; G. Hansen 32'; H. Hansen 58'	Report

Tórsvøllur, Tórshavn
Attendance: 3,367
Referee: Eiler Rasmussen

== Top goalscorers ==
Rank	Player	Team	Goals
1	(Poland) Łukasz Cieślewicz	B36	4
1	(Faroe Islands) Klæmint Olsen	NSÍ	4
3	(Senegal) Ahmed Keita	Giza Hoyvík	3
3	(Faroe Islands) Finnur Justinussen	Víkingur	3
5	(Faroe Islands) Kristoffur Jakobsen	ÍF	2
5	(Faroe Islands) Heðin Hansen	Víkingur	2
5	(Faroe Islands) Leivur Joensen	Giza Hoyvík	2
