= 2024 1. deild =

1. deild
- Season: 2024
- Dates: 9 March – 25 October 2024
- Champions: Víkingur Gøta II
- Promoted: Suðuroy; TB
- Relegated: HB II; Hoyvík

The 2024 1. deild was the 82nd season of second-tier football in the Faroe Islands, and the 48th under the current format.

== Teams ==
The league consisted of ten teams; six teams remaining from the previous season, two teams promoted from the 2. deild, and two teams relegated from the Faroe Islands Premier League.

The promoted teams were 2023 2. deild champions Suðuroy and runners-up NSÍ II. They replaced the 2023 1. deild bottom two teams, B68 Toftir II and EB/Streymur II. The relegated teams were 2023 Faroe Islands Premier League bottom two teams AB and TB. They replaced the 2023 1. deild promoted teams, Skála and NSÍ Runavík.

Locations of the 2024 Faroe Islands Premier League teams

Team	City	Stadium	Capacity
AB	Argir	Inni í Vika	2,000
B36 Tórshavn II	Tórshavn	Gundadalur	5,000
B71 Sandoy	Sandur	Inni í Dal	2,000
Havnar Bóltfelag II	Tórshavn	Gundadalur	5,000
Hoyvík	Hoyvík	Hoyvíksvøllur	1,000
KÍ II	Klaksvík	Við Djúpumýrar	2,500
NSÍ Runavík II	Runavík	Við Løkin	2,000
FC Suðuroy	Vágur	Á Eiðinum	3,000
TB	Trongisvágur	Við Stórá	1,600
Víkingur Gøta II	Leirvík	Sarpugerði	1,600

== League table ==
Pos	Team	Pld	W	D	L	GF	GA	GD	Pts	Promotion or relegation
1	Víkingur Gøta II (C)	27	16	6	5	72	35	+37	54	Ineligible for promotion as a league below main team
2	Suðuroy (P)	27	12	12	3	56	33	+23	48	Promotion to the Faroe Islands Premier League
3	TB (P)	27	11	12	4	39	24	+15	45	Promotion to the Faroe Islands Premier League
4	B71	27	12	8	7	44	29	+15	44	
5	B36 II	27	11	8	8	50	41	+9	41	
6	AB	27	10	10	7	47	31	+16	40	
7	NSÍ II	27	8	7	12	37	51	−14	31	
8	KÍ II	27	9	3	15	32	50	−18	30	
9	Hoyvík (R)	27	4	8	15	24	54	−30	20	Relegation to the 2. deild
10	HB II (R)	27	2	6	19	26	79	−53	12	Relegation to the 2. deild

Source: Soccerway
Rules for classification: 1) Points; 2) Goal difference; 3) Goals scored.
(C) Champions; (P) Promoted; (R) Relegated

== Results ==
Each team plays three times (either twice at home and once away or once at home and twice away) against every other team for a total of 27 matches each.

Home \ Away	ABA	B36	B71	HBÓ	HOY	KÍI	NSÍ	SUÐ	TBÓ	VÍK	ABA	B36	B71	HBÓ	HOY	KÍI	NSÍ	SUÐ	TBÓ	VÍK
AB	—	0–1	2–2	3–0	1–1	4–1	3–2	1–1	1–2	1–1	—	1–1	—	—	—	6–0	—	0–0	—	1–1
B36 II	3–1	—	5–1	1–1	0–1	3–2	0–2	1–1	2–2	3–0	—	—	1–3	—	2–2	0–2	—	—	0–0	2–2
B71	1–1	3–1	—	3–0	2–0	2–0	4–1	1–0	0–0	0–3	1–1	—	—	7–0	1–2	—	—	—	1–1	—
HB II	0–4	0–4	0–1	—	1–1	0–2	4–5	4–6	1–1	1–6	1–2	1–4	—	—	—	0–3	—	2–2	—	2–1
Hoyvík	1–0	1–2	1–1	1–1	—	0–2	1–2	1–4	1–1	1–4	0–5	—	—	2–1	—	—	0–1	3–3	0–1	—
KÍ II	1–2	1–3	1–2	4–1	0–0	—	0–0	2–2	1–2	0–3	—	—	0–1	—	2–1	—	—	—	0–2	0–6
NSÍ II	0–0	2–3	2–1	1–3	2–0	0–2	—	1–1	0–0	2–4	0–1	2–2	1–1	3–0	—	0–3	—	—	—	—
Suðuroy	2–1	3–2	0–2	2–1	6–0	2–0	2–2	—	1–1	1–1	—	2–1	1–0	—	—	4–0	5–0	—	—	—
TB	1–2	0–1	2–1	4–0	3–0	3–1	1–0	2–2	—	2–3	3–1	—	—	1–1	—	—	2–1	1–1	—	0–1
Víkingur Gøta II	4–2	5–2	2–1	5–0	3–2	1–2	2–3	0–1	1–1	—	—	—	1–1	—	3–1	—	6–2	3–1	—	—

Source: Soccerway
Legend: Blue = home team win; Yellow = draw; Red = away team win.

== See also ==
- 2024 Faroe Islands Premier League
- 2024 Faroe Islands Cup
- 2024 2. deild
