= 2015 1. deild =

1. deild
- Season: 2015
- Champions: Skála (1st title)
- Promoted: Skála; B68
- Relegated: B36 II; MB
- Matches played: 135
- Goals scored: 528 (3.91 per match)
- Top goalscorer: Brian Jakobsen (32 goals)
- Biggest home win: Skála 12–1 MB (R26); B71 11–0 MB (R21)
- Biggest away win: MB 1–9 Skála (R18); MB 1–9 AB II (R20)
- Highest scoring: Skála 12–1 MB (R26)

The 2015 1. deild was the seventy-second season of second-tier football on the Faroe Islands.

Brian Jakobsen scored 32 goals, breaking the goalscoring record in a single season, which would be then broken next year by Leif Niclasen.

== League table ==
Pos	Team	Pld	W	D	L	GF	GA	GD	Pts	Promotion or Relegation
1	Skála	27	22	4	1	96	17	+79	70	Promotion to Faroe Islands Premier League
2	B68	27	17	5	5	61	27	+34	56	Promotion to Faroe Islands Premier League
3	07 Vestur	27	14	6	7	66	36	+30	48	
4	AB II	27	13	7	7	50	41	+9	46	
5	KÍ II	27	12	2	13	65	50	+15	38	
6	Víkingur II	27	9	6	12	39	43	−4	33	
7	B71	27	9	6	12	47	56	−9	33	
8	NSÍ II	27	9	4	14	54	54	0	31	
9	B36 II	27	4	8	15	32	71	−39	20	Relegation to 2. deild
10	MB	27	1	2	24	18	133	−115	5	Relegation to 2. deild

Source: Faroe Soccer
Rules for classification: 1) points; 2) goal difference; 3) number of goals scored

== Top goalscorers ==
Rank	Player	Team	Goals
1	(Faroe Islands) Brian Jakobsen	Skála	32
2	(Faroe Islands) Jákup Johansen	Skála	19
3	(Faroe Islands) Petur Knudsen	NSÍ II	17
4	(Faroe Islands) Holgar Durhuus	07 Vestur	15
4	(Faroe Islands) Jóannes Danielsen	KÍ II	15
5	(Faroe Islands) Ari Olsen	B71	13

== See also ==
- 2015 Faroe Islands Premier League
- 2015 Faroe Islands Cup
