= List of football stadiums in the Faroe Islands =

The following is a list of stadiums in the Faroe Islands, ranked in order of capacity, with the minimum capacity being 1,000.

== Current stadiums ==
#	Image	Stadium	Capacity	City	Home team(s)
1		Tórsvøllur	6,040	Tórshavn	Faroe Islands national football team
2		Svangaskarð	6,000	Toftir	B68 Toftir; previously Faroe Islands national football team
3		Gundadalur	5,000	Tórshavn	HB Tórshavn & B36 Tórshavn
4		á Eiðinum	3,000	Vágur	FC Suðuroy
5		Í Fløtugerði	3,000	Fuglafjørður	ÍF Fuglafjørdur
6		Við Djúpumýrar	2,500	Klaksvík	KÍ Klaksvík
7		Á Dungasandi	1,400	Sørvágur	07 Vestur & SÍ Sørvágur's youth teams
8		Á Skørinum	2,000	Hvalba	Royn Hvalba
9		Sevmýri Stadium	2,000	Tvøroyri	none; previously TB Tvøroyri
10		Skansi Arena	2,000	Argir	AB Argir
11		Uppi á Brekku	2,000	Leirvík	none; previously LÍF Leirvík
12		Lilit Svangaskarð	1,800	Toftir	B68 Toftir
13		Sarpugerði	1,600	Norðragøta	Vikingur Gøta
14		Við Stórá	1,600	Trongisvágur	Tvøroyrar Bóltfelag
15		Við Løkin	1,500	Runavík	NSÍ Runavík
16		Inni í Dal	1,200	Sandoy	B71 Sandoy
17		á Krossinum	1,000	Sumba	none; previously SÍ Sumba; the football field is used as a solar park since 2019
18		Hoyvíksvøllur	1,000	Hoyvík	FC Hoyvík
19		MB Arena	1,000	Miðvágur	MB Miðvágur
20		Niðari vøllur (Gundadalur's lower field)	1,000	Tórshavn	Undrið FF
21		undir Mýruhjalla	1,000	Skála	Skála ÍF
22		Valloyran	1,000	Sandavágur	SÍF Sandavágur's youth teams
23		Við Margáir	1,000	Streymnes	EB/Streymur

== See also ==
- List of football stadiums in Denmark
- Lists of stadiums
