= 2015 in Faroese football =

Football in Faroe Islands
- Season: 2015

Men's football
- Super Cup: Víkingur

The 2015 season will be the 80th season of competitive association football in the Faroe Islands.

== National teams ==
=== Men ===
==== Senior ====
Wins	Losses	Draws
1	1	0

===== Exhibitions =====
none announced

===== UEFA Euro Qualification =====
29 March 5	Romania	1–0	Faroe Islands	Ploiești
18:00 (19:00 UTC+3)	Keșerü 21'	Report		Stadium: Ilie Oană Stadium; Attendance: 13,898; Referee: Artur Soares Dias (Portugal)

13 June 6	Faroe Islands	2–1	Greece	Tórshavn
20:45 (19:45 UTC+1)	Hansson 32'; B. Olsen 70'	Report	Papastathopoulos 84'	Stadium: Tórsvøllur; Referee: Tom Harald Hagen (Norway)

4 September 7	Faroe Islands	v	Northern Ireland	Tórshavn
20:45 (19:45 UTC+1)		Report		Stadium: Tórsvøllur

7 September 8	Finland	v	Faroe Islands	Helsinki
20:45 (21:45 UTC+3)		Report		Stadium: Olympiastadion

8 October 9	Hungary	v	Faroe Islands	Budapest
20:45 (20:45 UTC+2)		Report		Stadium: Groupama Arena

11 October 10	Faroe Islands	v	Romania	Tórshavn
18:00 (17:00 UTC+1)		Report		Stadium: Tórsvøllur

== Domestic Leagues ==
=== Faroe Islands Premier League ===
Pos	Team	Pld	W	D	L	GF	GA	GD	Pts	Qualification or relegation
1	B36 Tórshavn (C)	27	18	7	2	60	25	+35	61	Qualification for the Champions League first qualifying round
2	NSÍ Runavík	27	16	6	5	73	37	+36	54	Qualification for the Europa League first qualifying round (Note: Víkingur Gøta qualified for the UEFA Europa League first qualifying round by winning the 2015 Faroe Islands Cup.)
3	Víkingur Gøta	27	15	8	4	68	35	+33	53	Qualification for the Europa League first qualifying round
4	HB	27	11	10	6	43	31	+12	43	Qualification for the Europa League first qualifying round
5	KÍ	27	11	8	8	50	41	+9	41	
6	ÍF	27	5	12	10	44	56	−12	27	
7	TB	27	4	14	9	36	47	−11	26	
8	AB	27	4	12	11	34	42	−8	24	
9	FC Suðuroy (R)	27	6	4	17	39	68	−29	22	Relegation to 1. deild
10	EB/Streymur (R)	27	2	5	20	27	92	−65	11	Relegation to 1. deild

Source: Faroe Soccer, Soccerway
Rules for classification: 1) Points; 2) Goal difference; 3) Goals scored.
(C) Champions; (R) Relegated
