= Football in the Faroe Islands =

Football (Faroese: fótbóltur) is the most popular sport in the Faroe Islands, which is an autonomous territory within the Kingdom of Denmark. 60% of those who play sport on the islands play football. Football in the Faroe Islands is governed by the Faroe Islands Football Association, and it is a member of UEFA and FIFA, despite not being a sovereign state.

== About ==
Football is considered the most popular sport in the Faroe Islands, followed by handball, volleyball, and rowing (the national sport). According to FIFA, there are well over 5,000 registered football players in the Faroe Islands, as follows: All Players 8,094, Registered players 5,694, Unregistered Players 2,400, and Officials 1,050.

The record attendance for a football match in the Faroe Islands is 6,642 people. The record was set in 1998 when the Faroe Islands won 2–1 against Malta, at the Svangaskarð.

English Football is also very popular in the Faroe Islands, many people with access to satellite television and the internet watch the Premier League.

It has also become more common for talented Faroese players to leave for bigger clubs abroad. Naturally the clubs in the Faroes, that have "made and paid" these players since a young age want some kind of reimbursement. Even small fees can make a huge difference for the small and most often economically vulnerable Faroese clubs. Two good examples of very talented players "lost" abroad for nothing in the early 1990s are the Faroese national star player Todi Jónsson, and national goalkeeper Jákup Mikkelsen. Both players have been Champions in Denmark. They were both originally from KÍ Klaksvík – Faroese double winners 1999 – but the club did not receive any payment for these two players. Though in recent years compensation and reimbursement of expenses has increased. It is also becoming more commonplace for players to transfer between clubs. Players are now contracted at clubs, this means they cannot just leave the club suddenly without notice for another club during the season or between two seasons, which was very much the case prior to 1998. Players have a full-time civilian jobs as well or the younger players might go to college. Money has crept into the game more and more, and the players in the top division are now semi-professional. But as the global economic slowdown has also hit Faroese football, players' wages were lowered considerably in 2009. KÍ Klaksvík was one of the clubs experiencing financial problems and were relegated for the first time in their history in 2009. Because of spending, the Faroese Football Association has now made stricter rules when it comes to football club's balance sheet.

The teams are mostly made up of Faroese players, but there are increasing numbers of foreign imports. During the 2015 Faroe Islands Premier League season, twenty-five foreigners from fourteen countries including Brazil, Nigeria, and the United States had featured in matches by June.

Five institutions run football schools, attended by 1,000 children each year. Todi Jónsson is probably the most famous player from the Faroe Islands of all times. He used to play for FC Copenhagen in Denmark and was the top scorer in the 2002/2003 season. In March 2010, Mona Breckmann became the first female player to sign a contract with a club on mainland Europe, after joining Karlsruher SC in Germany. The only other female player from the Faroe Islands to play abroad, was when goalkeeper Randi Wardum had a spell with Valur Reykjavík in Iceland several years before.

On 20 August 2003 the national association headquarters in Tórshavn was officially opened on the occasion of the Euro 2004 qualifying match between the Faroe Islands and Iceland. The funds were supplied by Goal, the FIFA Financial Assistance Programme, national association and government, the latter also donating the land that was needed to realise the project. The building, which is adjacent to the national stadium, will bring together the administrative services, education staff and material management of the national association. It will also provide a central base for courses in development programmes, training camps of national/representative teams, conferences and meetings. The national association is confident that the investment will have a positive effect upon football in general, and the country as a whole.

== History ==
The game has certainly come a long way in the Faroe Islands since the first club, Tvoroyrar Boltfelag, was established in 1892. Clubs initially played friendlies in an unofficial championship, with home and away matches, depending on the state of the weather and of the generally uneven grass pitches. Due to a lack of rivals, the first few teams on the island played their matches against members of the crews of English ships that usually docked in the ports of the island. Thus, matches could be seen especially against the crew of the British Royal Navy. It took 50 years for a national championship to be officially launched in 1942, three years after the formation of the Faroe Islands Sports Association (ISF). The national cup competition began in 1955.

The ISF's duties were taken over by the newly formed Faroe Islands Football Association (FSF – Fótbóltssamband Føroya) on 13 January 1979. The FSF's remit has included planning and organising national tournaments, as well as ensuring improved training conditions for coaches, officials and referees. The introduction of artificial turf in the 1980s is seen by many as the FSF's single most effective move, as it considerably raised the game's popularity as a participation sport.

Faroese clubs have also been involved in the UEFA Competitions since 1992, taking part in the Champions League, Cup Winners Cup and the UEFA cup, now the UEFA Europa League.

== International football ==
The Faroe Islands became a member of FIFA on 2 July 1988 and joined UEFA on 18 April 1990. Before gaining international recognition, the Faroese national team played occasional matches against representative sides from Shetland, Orkney and Iceland. The team began taking part in UEFA European Championship and FIFA World Cup qualifiers from 1990.

The Faroe Islands recorded a 1–0 victory over Austria in a Euro 92 qualifying match, on 12 September 1990.

International membership has also encouraged a steady rise in standards both on the pitch and off it – where administration is key. In the 1990s the country's first two grass-pitch stadiums were built, which ultimately enabled more and more Faroese players to try their luck abroad, primarily in Denmark, Iceland and Norway. Yet, to many local fans, the development of youth football is just as important as the top end of the national game. Competitions are run for young players across six separate age groups throughout the islands to make sure the future remains bright.

== League system ==
The Faroe Islands has a Football League made up of four divisions. There are also two women's leagues and two leagues for the veterans, male and female. There are also youth and junior leagues. There used to be a fifth division (4. deild), this division was outside the ranking order, meaning teams were not relegated from 3. deild, neither could teams be promoted by winning 4. deild. In 2006 the system changed and the Faroese FA decided from season on there would only be four levels. This was because many matches were postponed in 4. deild for various reasons. In 2005 HB's fourth team was declared winners of 5. deild after only playing three competitive matches. Other changes in 2006 by the FA included the scrapping of the promotion and relegation playoffs at the end of the season, where the team who finished in ninth place would play the team that finished in second place in the league below.

Level	Leagues/Divisions
1	Effodeildin; 10 clubs
2	1. deild 10 clubs (5 reserve)
3	2. deild 10 clubs (8 reserve)
4	3. deild Group A - 7 clubs Group B - 6 clubs; (13 reserve)

Locations of the 2024 Faroe Islands teams

== Faroese Women's Football League ==
The Faroese Women's Football League is an association football league in the Faroe Islands. Women's football teams are relatively new in the Faroes, only dating back to the 1980s. Recently, they have received the support of former clubs which are now helping them gain further popularity.

Women's teams in the Faroes are not easy to find, because the few women's teams that exist always play under the first of the men's teams. There are only six teams in the best division (1. Deild), and six in the second division (2. Deild).

Women
1. deild kvinnur
2. deild kvinnur
U-17 "Gentur"
U-14 "Smágentur"
U-12 "Gentur 10-12"
U-10 "Pinkur"

== Stadiums and football grounds ==
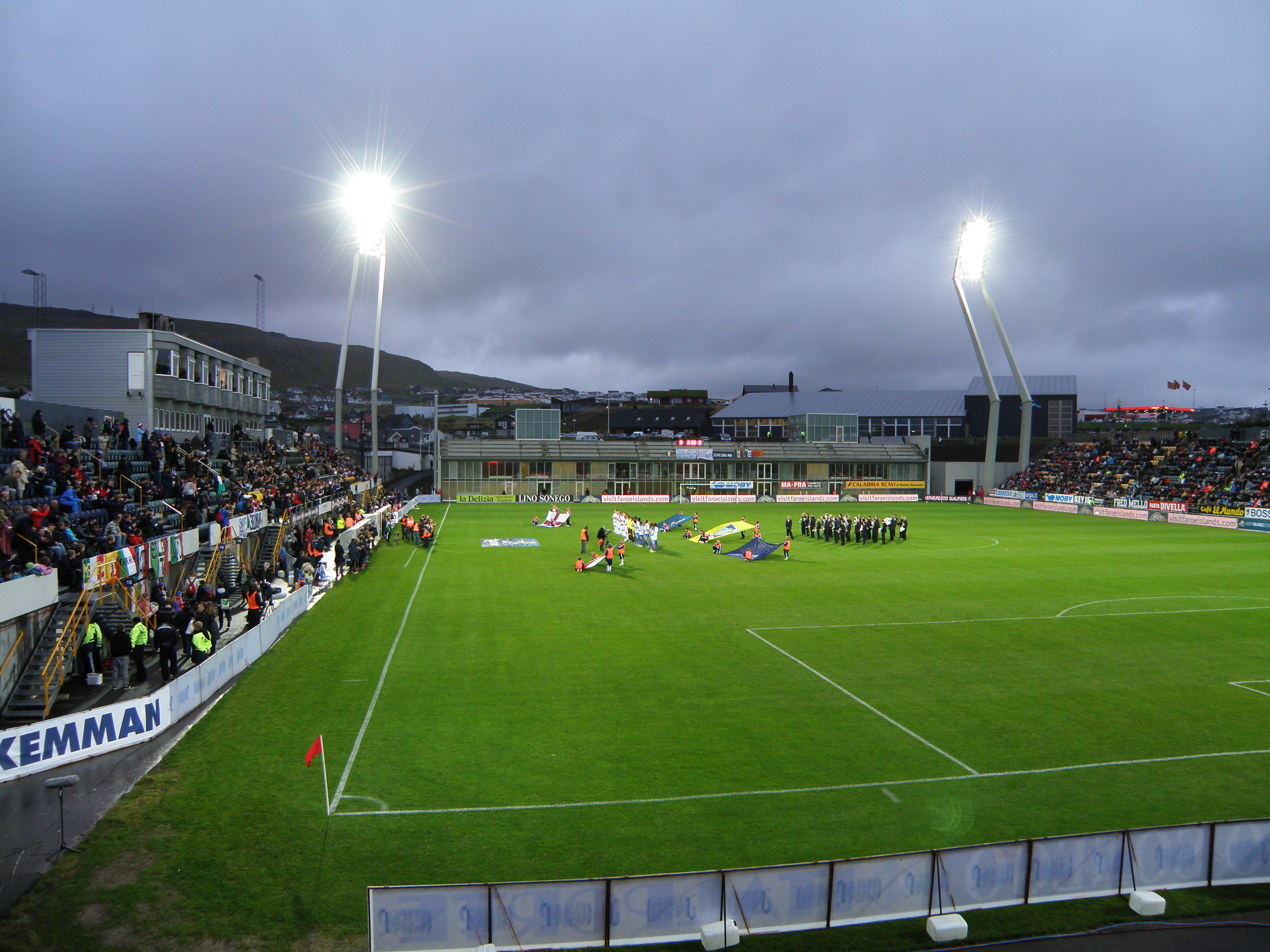
Tórsvøllur, in Tórshavn, is one of two national stadiums in the Faroe Islands. It has the larger capacity of the two with 6,000.

Most of the pitches in the Faroe Islands are covered with artificial grass, as the weather conditions are not good for natural grass pitches. The two national stadiums used for international matches, Svangaskarð (cap. 5,000) situated at the village of Toftir, and since 1999 the new 6,000-capacity Tórsvøllur Stadium in Tórshavn, are two main natural grass pitches. Royn Hvalba, a club in one of the lower divisions, play their matches on real grass. B68 Toftir is the only other club to play on a grass pitch, as they play at the Svangaskarð. But all other league clubs play their home matches on artificial pitches.

The 5,000-capacity Gundadalur was built in 1911 as a grass pitch, but it was soon changed to a sand pitch like all other pitches in those days. The introduction of artificial grass is regarded as one of the greatest benefits to football in this country. In the summer of 1998 the old surface was replaced with a new one. Gundadalur Stadium is owned by the Tórshavn City Council.

During the 1980s almost all pitches on the islands were covered with artificial grass, and now more than ever the pitches are the public playground (outside training and match hours) for the children in particular. Many of the grounds have no seats for supporters, you have to stand up under no cover, often in harsh weather conditions and watch the matches, which usually attract approx. 300 to 1,000 people in the top division. The first official competitive match against Austria was played in Sweden, because there was no suitable grass pitches in the Faroe Islands at that time. Most teams played on artificial pitches, but a few still played on sand pitches.

All Faroese UEFA and FIFA matches are being played at these two stadiums. But since 2009 all international matches could in principle be played at Gundadalur Stadium, as UEFA and FIFA have now approved of the artificial grass in this stadium.

In general each football club/town in the Faroes has only one single pitch for both training and matches. This is most often a matter of physical circumstances (e.g. no space) and also very much a question of money. Most pitches today are owned by the town council and not by the clubs themselves. For most of the small clubs/towns one pitch is indeed enough, as the population in general is very small 400 to 2,000 people.

HB and B36, the two big clubs from Tórshavn (18,000 people) have only two artificial grass pitches in Gundadalur Stadium area, and both clubs have about 30 teams training and competing every year, so they have rather bad training conditions compared to other clubs, which can pick their training hours much more freely. The pitches in Tórshavn are owned by the city council and the clubs use it at no cost. In 1999 a new stadium with natural grass for international matches only - clubs and country - was built in Tórshavn (cap. 6,000 seats) owned by a private consortium.

Gundadalur training ground, Tórshavn. The other artificial pitch in Tórshavn. It is used for training by 3 of city's clubs: HB, B36 and FC Hoyvik. It is also used for matches in the lower divisions. The pitch is situated just behind the Tórsvøllur Stadium and next to the Gundadalur Stadium.

== Attendances ==
The average attendance per top-flight football league season and the club with the highest average attendance:

Season	League average	Best club	Best club average
2024	418	HB	629

== See also ==
- Faroe Islands national football team
- Faroe Islands Premier League
- List of football clubs in Faroe Islands
- List of football stadiums in the Faroe Islands
