= 2025 Faroe Islands Cup =

Løgmanssteypið

Tournament details
- Country: Faroe Islands
- Teams: 15

Final positions
- Champions: KÍ (7th title)
- Runners-up: Víkingur

Tournament statistics
- Matches played: 16
- Goals scored: 59 (3.69 per match)

The 2025 Faroe Islands Cup was the 71st edition of the Faroe Islands domestic football cup. It began on 7 April and ended on 31 October 2025.

KÍ won the cup (their seventh Faroe Islands Cup win), defeating Víkingur 2–0 in the final. Since they qualified for the Conference League based on league position, the spot for winning the cup was passed to the second-placed team of the 2025 Faroe Islands Premier League (Havnar Bóltfelag).

== First round ==
Nine teams from the 2025 Faroe Islands Premier League, four teams from the 2025 1. deild, and one team from the 2025 2. deild entered the first round; one team from the Premier League (EB/Streymur) received a bye.

Team 1	Score	Team 2
7 April 2025
Skála (2)	8–0	TB (1)
Víkingur (1)	3–1	NSÍ Runavík (1)
AB (2)	1–0	Suðuroy (1)
Havnar Bóltfelag (1)	1–2	KÍ (1)
07 Vestur (1)	1–3	B36 Tórshavn (1)
9 April 2025
B68 Toftir (1)	4–0	ÍF (2)
Hoyvík (3)	1–2	B71 Sandoy (2)

== Quarter-finals ==
The seven first round winners and the one team given a first round bye entered the quarter-finals.

Team 1	Score	Team 2
21 April 2025
KÍ (1)	1–1 (4–3 p)	B36 Tórshavn (1)
EB/Streymur (1)	2–3	AB (2)
B71 Sandoy (2)	3–6	B68 Toftir (1)
Víkingur (1)	2–1	Skála (2)

== Semi-finals ==
The four quarter-final winners entered the semi-finals, held over two legs. The first legs were held on 20 and 21 May 2025, followed by the second legs on 17 June.

Team 1	Agg.	Team 2	1st leg	2nd leg
KÍ (1)	6–1	AB (2)	4–0	2–1
B68 Toftir (1)	0–4	Víkingur (1)	0–2	0–2

== Final ==
The final was held between the two semi-final winners.

31 October 2025
15:00

KÍ	2–0	Víkingur
Mikkelsen 39'; Klettskarð 90+1'	Report

Tórsvøllur, Tórshavn
Attendance: 3,518
Referee: Jákup Mohr
