= 2016 1. deild =

1. deild
- Season: 2016
- Champions: EB/Streymur (2nd title)
- Promoted: EB/Streymur; 07 Vestur
- Relegated: AB II; B71
- Matches played: 135
- Goals scored: 592 (4.39 per match)
- Top goalscorer: Leif Niclasen (36 goals)

The 2016 1. deild was the seventy-third season of second-tier football on the Faroe Islands.

Leif Niclasen scored 36 goals, breaking the goalscoring record in a single season, set by Brian Jacobsen in the previous year.

== League table ==
Pos	Team	Pld	W	D	L	GF	GA	GD	Pts	Promotion or Relegation
1	EB/Streymur	27	21	4	2	105	28	+77	67	Promotion to Faroe Islands Premier League
2	07 Vestur	27	21	2	4	98	34	+64	65	Promotion to Faroe Islands Premier League
3	FC Suðuroy	27	17	3	7	67	40	+27	54	
4	Giza Hoyvík	27	15	3	9	60	40	+20	48	
5	NSÍ II	27	11	1	15	59	83	−24	34	
6	KÍ II	27	10	3	14	53	67	−14	33	
7	Víkingur II	27	9	4	14	42	60	−18	31	
8	HB II	27	9	3	15	50	69	−19	30	
9	AB II	27	3	5	19	22	73	−51	14	Relegation to 2. deild
10	B71	27	3	4	20	36	98	−62	13	Relegation to 2. deild

Source: Faroe Soccer
Rules for classification: 1) points; 2) goal difference; 3) number of goals scored

== Top goalscorers ==
Rank	Player	Team	Goals
1	(Faroe Islands) Leif Niclasen	EB/Streymur	36
2	(Faroe Islands) Søren Nielsen	07 Vestur	26
3	(Senegal) Ahmed Keita	Giza Hoyvík	22
4	(Faroe Islands) Debes Danielsen	NSÍ II	20
5	(Faroe Islands) Holgar Durhuus	07 Vestur	19

== See also ==
- 2016 Faroe Islands Premier League
- 2016 Faroe Islands Cup
