= Árni Frederiksberg =

Faroese footballer (born 1992)

Personal information
- Full name: Árni Frederiksberg
- Date of birth: 13 June 1992 (age 34)
- Place of birth: Saltangará, Faroe Islands
- Position: Winger

Team information
- Current team: KÍ
- Number: 7

Youth career
- –2009: NSÍ

Senior career*
Years	Team	Apps	(Gls)
2009–2011	NSÍ II	61	(23)
2010–2018	NSÍ	207	(70)
2019–2020	B36 Tórshavn	52	(15)
2021–	KÍ	154	(69)

International career^{‡}
2010	Faroe Islands U19	3	(0)
2013–2014	Faroe Islands U21	7	(1)
2015–	Faroe Islands	22	(3)
- * Club domestic league appearances and goals as of 1 November 2026 ‡ National team caps and goals as of 28 March 2026

Árni Frederiksberg (born 13 June 1992) is a Faroese professional footballer who plays as an attacking midfielder or winger for KÍ Klaksvík and the Faroe Islands national football team.

== Club career ==
Árni Frederiksberg has spent most of his career with his childhood club NSÍ Runavík.

On 1 November 2018, Frederiksberg signed a pre-contract with B36 Tórshavn, where he immediately became one of the leading players.

On the 8th of January 2021, Árni signed for KÍ Klaksvík and became one of the best players in the league. He was credited with 22 assists in 26 games in the 2021 Faroe Islands Premier League. For 2020/21, Transfermarkt has Frederiksberg registered as the top player, globally, in national top league assists. The same statistic has Frederiksberg listed as tenth in the world for 2021/22 and 2024/25, and fifteenth for 2025/26.

In the 2023/2024 season, Frederiksberg has been one of KÍ's best players during their run in UEFA Champions League qualifying, having scored 6 goals as KÍ beat both Ferencvárosi TC and BK Häcken. He scored two more in the first leg of the third qualifying round, overturning Molde FK's 1–0 lead in the second half.

Internationally, he represented the Faroe Islands from 2015 to 2019, and retired from international duty before returning in 2025. He scored 18 goals and provided 12 assists in 25 games in the 2025 Faroe Islands Premier League

Frederiksberg continued to deliver a high number of assists in the 2026 Faroe Islands Premier League, reaching 16 assists in 19 games as of August 2026.

== Career statistics ==
=== Club ===
As of 5 April 2026

Appearances and goals by club, season and competition
Club	Season	League			National cup (Note: Includes Faroe Islands Cup)		Europe		Other		Total	
Club	Season	Division	Apps	Goals	Apps	Goals	Apps	Goals	Apps	Goals	Apps	Goals
NSÍ II	2009	1. deild	25	5	—		—		—		25	5
NSÍ II	2010	1. deild	21	9	—		—		—		21	9
NSÍ II	2011	1. deild	15	9	—		—		—		15	9
NSÍ II	Total		61	23	0	0	0	0	0	0	61	23
NSÍ	2010	Meistaradeildin	9	2	0	0	1 (Note: Appearance(s) in UEFA Europa League)	0	—		10	2
NSÍ	2011	Meistaradeildin	24	2	2	0	2	0	—		28	2
NSÍ	2012	Meistaradeildin	26	7	1	0	2	0	—		29	7
NSÍ	2013	Meistaradeildin	26	8	4	2	—		—		30	10
NSÍ	2014	Meistaradeildin	26	10	2	2	—		—		28	12
NSÍ	2015	Meistaradeildin	21	10	4	1	2	0	—		27	11
NSÍ	2016	Meistaradeildin	27	11	4	1	0	0	—		31	12
NSÍ	2017	Meistaradeildin	22	9	4	2	2	0	—		28	11
NSÍ	2018	Meistaradeildin	26	11	1	0	1	0	1 (Note: Appearance in Faroe Islands Super Cup)	1	29	12
NSÍ	Total		207	70	22	8	10	0	1	1	240	79
B36	2019	Meistaradeildin	27	8	2	2	2	0	1	0	32	10
B36	2020	Meistaradeildin	25	7	3	2	4	0	—		32	9
B36	Total		52	15	5	4	6	0	1	0	64	19
KÍ	2021	Meistaradeildin	26	10	1	0	2 (Note: Appearances in UEFA Europa Conference League)	0	—		29	10
KÍ	2022	Meistaradeildin	26	11	5	0	5 (Note: One appearances in UEFA Champions League, four appearances in UEFA Europa Conference League)	0	1	0	37	11
KÍ	2023	Meistaradeildin	27	13	1	0	13 (Note: Six appearances and six goals in UEFA Champions League, two appearances in UEFA Europa League, five appearances in UEFA Conference League)	6	1	0	42	19
KÍ	2024	Meistaradeildin	25	9	1	0	0	0	1	1	27	10
KÍ	2025	Meistaradeildin	25	18	4	0	14 (Note: Four appearances and five goals in UEFA Champions League, two appearances in UEFA Europa League, eight appearances and three goals in UEFA Conference League)	8	0	0	43	26
KÍ	2026	Meistaradeildin	3	1	1	0	0	0	0	0	4	1
KÍ	Total		132	62	13	0	34	14	3	1	182	77
Career total			452	170	40	12	50	14	5	2	542	198

=== International ===
As of match played 28 March 2026

Appearances and goals by national team and year
National team	Year	Apps	Goals
Faroe Islands	2015	1	0
Faroe Islands	2016	1	0
Faroe Islands	2017	0	0
Faroe Islands	2018	1	0
Faroe Islands	2019	8	0
Faroe Islands	2020	0	0
Faroe Islands	2021	0	0
Faroe Islands	2022	0	0
Faroe Islands	2023	0	0
Faroe Islands	2024	0	0
Faroe Islands	2025	10	2
Faroe Islands	2026	1	1
Total		22	3

=== International goals ===
No.	Date	Venue	Opponent	Score	Result	Competition
1.	9 June 2025	Tórsvøllur, Tórshavn, Faroe Islands	Gibraltar	1–1	2–1	2026 FIFA World Cup qualification
2.	9 October 2025	Tórsvøllur, Tórshavn, Faroe Islands	Montenegro	4–0	4–0	2026 FIFA World Cup qualification
3.	28 March 2026	San Marino Stadium, Serravalle, San Marino	San Marino	2–1	2–1	Friendly

== Honours ==
NSÍ

- Faroe Islands Cup: 2017

KÍ Klaksvík

- Faroe Islands Premier League: 2021, 2022, 2025
- Faroe Islands Super Cup: 2022, 2023
