= 2015 Faroe Islands Premier League =

Faroe Islands Premier League
- Season: 2015
- Champions: B36 Tórshavn
- Relegated: EB/Streymur; FC Suðuroy
- Champions League: B36 Tórshavn
- Europa League: NSÍ Runavík; Víkingur Gøta; HB
- Matches: 120
- Goals: 413 (3.44 per match)
- Top goalscorer: Klæmint Olsen (21 goals)
- Biggest home win: NSÍ Runavík 6–1 Suðuroy; Víkingur Gøta 7–2 TB
- Biggest away win: EB/Streymur 0–8 NSÍ Runavík
- Highest scoring: Víkingur Gøta 7–2 TB

2015 Faroe Islands Premier League was the 73rd season of top-tier football on the Faroe Islands. For sponsorship reasons, it was known as Effodeildin. B36 Tórshavn were the defending champions, having won their tenth Faroese title last season.

== Teams ==
Location of teams in Effodeildin 2015

Skála and B68 had finished 9th and 10th respectively at the end of the previous season and were relegated to the 1. deild as a result.

Replacing them were the 1. deild champions TB and runners-up FC Suðuroy.

=== Team summaries ===
Team	City	Stadium	Capacity	Manager	Kit	Shirt sponsor
AB	Argir	Skansi Arena	2,000	(Faroe Islands) Sámal Erik Hentze	Adidas	The Irish Pub
B36 Tórshavn	Tórshavn	Gundadalur	5,000	(Faroe Islands) Eyðun Klakstein	Adidas	J&K Petersen
EB/Streymur	Streymnes	Við Margáir	1,000	(Faroe Islands) Eliesar Olsen	Nike	(Note: Thor, Atlanticpane, Bátafiskur, Norðsetur and Vermland are the sponsors of EB/Streymur, each player wears a shirt with one of these five different sponsors.)
FC Suðuroy	Vágur	Á Eiðinum	3,000	(Faroe Islands) Jón Pauli Olsen	Nike	Suðuroyar Sparikassi
HB	Tórshavn	Gundadalur	5,000	(Serbia) Milan Cimburović	Nike	Auto Service
ÍF	Fuglafjørður	Í Fløtugerði	3,000	(Serbia) Aleksandar Jovević	Puma	Havsbrún
KÍ	Klaksvík	Við Djúpumýrar	3,000	(Faroe Islands) Mikkjal Thomassen	Adidas	JFK
NSÍ Runavík	Runavík	Við Løkin	2,000	(Faroe Islands) Trygvi Mortensen	Nike	Bakkafrost
TB	Tvøroyri	Við Stórá	4,000	(Iceland) Páll Guðlaugsson	Hummel	Varðin Pelagic
Víkingur Gøta	Norðragøta	Sarpugerði	3,000	(Faroe Islands) Sigfríður Clementsen	Adidas	P/F Wenzel

=== Managerial changes ===
Team	Outgoing manager	Manner of departure	Date of vacancy	Position in table	Incoming manager	Date of appointment
EB/Streymur	(Faroe Islands) Rúni Nolsøe	Resigned	11 November 2014	Pre-season	(Faroe Islands) Eliesar Olsen	11 November 2014
KÍ	(Faroe Islands) Eyðun Klakstein	Sacked	11 November 2014	Pre-season	(Faroe Islands) Mikkjal Thomassen	11 November 2014
ÍF	(Faroe Islands) Albert Ellefsen	Resigned	11 November 2014	Pre-season	(Serbia) Aleksandar Jovević	28 November 2014
B36 Tórshavn	(Faroe Islands) Sámal Erik Hentze	Resigned	24 November 2014	Pre-season	(Faroe Islands) Eyðun Klakstein	11 December 2014
AB	(Faroe Islands) Oddbjørn Joensen	Sacked	1 June 2015	9th	(Faroe Islands) Sámal Erik Hentze	1 June 2015
HB	(Faroe Islands) Heðin Askham	Resigned	8 August 2015	4th	(Serbia) Milan Cimburović	9 August 2015

== League table ==
Pos	Team	Pld	W	D	L	GF	GA	GD	Pts	Qualification or relegation
1	B36 Tórshavn (C)	27	18	7	2	60	25	+35	61	Qualification for the Champions League first qualifying round
2	NSÍ Runavík	27	16	6	5	73	37	+36	54	Qualification for the Europa League first qualifying round (Note: Víkingur Gøta qualified for the UEFA Europa League first qualifying round by winning the 2015 Faroe Islands Cup.)
3	Víkingur Gøta	27	15	8	4	68	35	+33	53	Qualification for the Europa League first qualifying round
4	HB	27	11	10	6	43	31	+12	43	Qualification for the Europa League first qualifying round
5	KÍ	27	11	8	8	50	41	+9	41	
6	ÍF	27	5	12	10	44	56	−12	27	
7	TB	27	4	14	9	36	47	−11	26	
8	AB	27	4	12	11	34	42	−8	24	
9	FC Suðuroy (R)	27	6	4	17	39	68	−29	22	Relegation to 1. deild
10	EB/Streymur (R)	27	2	5	20	27	92	−65	11	Relegation to 1. deild

Source: Faroe Soccer, Soccerway
Rules for classification: 1) Points; 2) Goal difference; 3) Goals scored.
(C) Champions; (R) Relegated

=== Positions by round ===
Team ╲ Round	1	2	3	4	5	6	7	8	9	10	11	12	13	14	15	16	17	18	19	20	21	22	23	24	25	26	27
AB	2	5	8	7	7	8	8	9	9	9	9	9	9	9	9	9	9	9	9	9							
B36 Tórshavn	6	4	2	2	2	2	2	2	2	2	2	2	2	2	2	2	1	1	1	1							
EB/Streymur	6	9	9	9	9	9	9	10	10	10	10	10	10	10	10	10	10	10	10	10							
FC Suðuroy	10	10	10	10	10	10	10	8	8	8	8	8	8	8	8	8	8	8	8	8							
HB	2	5	3	3	3	4	3	4	3	3	3	3	3	3	4	4	4	4	4	4							
ÍF	2	5	6	8	8	5	5	6	5	7	6	7	7	6	6	6	6	6	7	6							
KÍ	6	2	5	5	6	7	6	5	7	5	7	5	5	5	5	5	5	5	5	5							
NSÍ Runavík	1	1	1	1	1	1	1	1	1	1	1	1	1	1	1	1	2	2	2	2							
TB	6	8	3	3	5	6	7	7	6	6	5	6	6	7	7	7	7	7	6	7							
Víkingur Gøta	2	3	6	6	4	3	4	3	4	4	4	4	4	4	3	3	3	3	3	3							

Updated to match(es) played on 9 August 2015. Source: Faroe Soccer

== Results ==
=== Regular home games ===
Home \ Away	AB	B36	EBS	SUÐ	HB	ÍF	KÍ	NSÍ	TB	VÍK
Argja Bóltfelag		1–3	1–2	2–1	0–1	1–1	0–4	1–2	1–1	0–0
B36 Tórshavn	1–1		1–1	1–0	1–1	4–0	1–0	3–0	3–0	3–3
EB/Streymur	0–0	0–2		3–5	0–3	2–2	4–4	0–8	0–3	1–2
FC Suðuroy	3–1	1–3	2–1		1–2	5–2	0–2	1–3	1–3	1–3
Havnar Bóltfelag	2–2	1–3	4–2	0–0		1–0	3–1	1–1	0–0	2–1
ÍF Fuglafjørður	3–3	3–1	4–1	2–3	1–1		3–1	0–3	2–0	1–3
KÍ Klaksvík	2–1	2–1	4–0	3–0	0–2	0–0		3–3	1–0	3–2
NSÍ Runavík	2–1	2–2	5–1	6–1	2–0	3–1	3–0		0–0	2–4
TB Tvøroyri	1–1	1–3	3–2	4–1	1–1	1–1	1–1	2–3		2–2
Víkingur Gøta	3–1	1–1	3–0	4–0	3–0	2–2	3–3	5–1	7–2	

Source: Faroe Soccer
Legend: Blue = home team win; Yellow = draw; Red = away team win.

=== Additional home games ===
Home \ Away	AB	B36	EBS	SUÐ	HB	ÍF	KÍ	NSÍ	TB	VÍK
Argja Bóltfelag						2–2		0–1	3–0	0–0
B36 Tórshavn	2–2						2–1	3–0	2–1	1–0
EB/Streymur	0–4	0–5				0–3			2–2	2–1
FC Suðuroy	1–1	1–3	3–2						2–2	
Havnar Bóltfelag	3–1	1–2	6–0	2–0					2–2	
ÍF Fuglafjørður		1–3		3–3	2–2		1–1			
KÍ Klaksvík	1–3		6–1	2–1	2–0					
NSÍ Runavík			6–0	5–1	0–0	5–1	4–1			
TB Tvøroyri						1–1	1–1	2–2		0–2
Víkingur Gøta				3–1	3–2	4–2	1–1	3–1		

Source: Faroe Soccer
Legend: Blue = home team win; Yellow = draw; Red = away team win.

== Top goalscorers ==
As of 13 November

Rank	Player	Club	Goals
1	(Faroe Islands) Klæmint Olsen	NSÍ Runavík	21
2	(Faroe Islands) Finnur Justinussen	Víkingur Gøta	15
3	(Faroe Islands) Andreas Lava Olsen	Víkingur Gøta	12
3	(Faroe Islands) Pól Jóhannus Justinussen	NSÍ Runavík	12
5	(Faroe Islands) Heðin Klakstein	KÍ Klaksvík	11
6	(Netherlands) Albert Adu	TB	10
6	(Faroe Islands) Árni Frederiksberg	NSÍ Runavík	10
6	(Poland) Łukasz Cieślewicz	B36 Tórshavn	10
9	(Faroe Islands) Hans Pauli Samuelsen	B36 Tórshavn	9

=== Hat-tricks ===
Player	For	Against	Result	Date
(Faroe Islands) Klæmint Olsen	NSÍ Runavík	FC Suðuroy	6–1	1 March 2015
(Faroe Islands) Andreas Lava Olsen	Víkingur Gøta	B36 Tórshavn	3–3	8 March 2015
(Faroe Islands) Arnbjørn Hansen	HB	EB/Streymur	4–2	2 April 2015
(Faroe Islands) Finnur Justinussen^{1}	Víkingur Gøta	FC Suðuroy	4–0	2 April 2015
(Netherlands) Albert Adu	TB	FC Suðuroy	4–1	14 May 2015
(Faroe Islands) Klæmint Olsen	NSÍ Runavík	EB/Streymur	0–8	25 May 2015
(Faroe Islands) Andreas Lava Olsen	Víkingur Gøta	NSÍ Runavík	2–4	31 May 2015
(Faroe Islands) Pól Jóhannus Justinussen	NSÍ Runavík	ÍF	5–1	3 August 2015

- ^{1} Scored four goals.
