= 2023 Faroe Islands Premier League =

Faroe Islands Premier League
- Season: 2023
- Dates: 4 March – 29 October 2023
- Champions: KÍ (21st title)
- Relegated: AB Argir; TB Tvøroyri
- Champions League: KÍ
- Conference League: B36 Tórshavn; Havnar Bóltfelag; Víkingur
- Matches: 89
- Goals: 281 (3.16 per match)
- Top goalscorer: Sølvi Vatnhamar (21 goals)
- Biggest home win: Víkingur 7–0 TB Tvøroyri (1 April 2023)
- Biggest away win: ÍF 1–7 KÍ (29 May 2023)
- Highest scoring: KÍ 7–1 TB Tvøroyri (5 March 2023); ÍF 1–7 KÍ (29 May 2023)
- Longest winning run: 16 matches KÍ
- Longest unbeaten run: 16 matches KÍ
- Longest winless run: 13 matches AB Argir
- Longest losing run: 9 matches ÍF
- All statistics correct as of 2 July 2023.

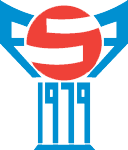
Faroe Islands FA logo

The 2023 Faroe Islands Premier League was the 81st edition of top-tier football in the Faroe Islands, and the 18th under the current format.

The winners (KÍ) qualified for the Champions League first qualifying round. The 2023 Faroe Islands Cup winners (Havnar Bóltfelag) qualified for the Conference League second qualifying round. The runners-up and fourth-placed team (Víkingur and B36 Tórshavn) qualified for the Conference League first qualifying round. The bottom two teams (AB Argir and TB Tvøroyri) were relegated to the 2024 1. deild.

KÍ started the league season with 16 straight wins, one of the best known season starts in European top division football, before losing 1-2 to Víkingur on 13 August.

== Teams ==
=== Team changes ===
Promoted from 2022 1. deild	Relegated to 2023 1. deild
ÍF; TB Tvøroyri	NSÍ Runavík; Skála

ÍF won the 2022 1. deild title to earn promotion. Third-placed TB Tvøroyri were also promoted as runners-up Víkingur 2 were not eligible for promotion. They replaced the 2022 Faroe Islands Premier League bottom two teams, NSÍ Runavík and Skála.

KÍ entered the season as defending champions after winning their 20th Faroese title in the previous season.

Team	City	Stadium	Capacity
07 Vestur	Sørvágur	á Dungasandi	2,000
AB Argir	Argir	Inni í Vika	2,000
B36 Tórshavn	Tórshavn	Gundadalur	5,000
B68 Toftir	Toftir	Svangaskarð	6,000
EB/Streymur	Streymnes	Við Margáir	2,000
Havnar Bóltfelag	Tórshavn	Gundadalur	5,000
ÍF	Fuglafjørður	Í Fløtugerði	3,000
KÍ	Klaksvík	Við Djúpumýrar	4,000
TB Tvøroyri	Tvøroyri	Við Stórá	4,000
Víkingur	Norðragøta	Sarpugerði	3,000

Locations of the 2023 Faroe Islands Premier League teams

== League table ==
Pos	Team	Pld	W	D	L	GF	GA	GD	Pts	Qualification or relegation
1	KÍ (C)	27	21	4	2	66	19	+47	67	Qualification for the Champions League first qualifying round
2	Víkingur	27	19	3	5	76	23	+53	60	Qualification for the Conference League first qualifying round
3	Havnar Bóltfelag	27	18	4	5	68	23	+45	58	Qualification for the Conference League second qualifying round (Note: Havnar Bóltfelag qualified for the Conference League second qualifying round by winning the 2023 Faroe Islands Cup. Since they qualified based on league position, the second Conference League first round spot was passed to the fourth-placed team.)
4	B36 Tórshavn	27	18	3	6	54	27	+27	57	Qualification for the Conference League first qualifying round
5	07 Vestur	27	12	4	11	42	41	+1	40	
6	EB/Streymur	27	7	4	16	25	53	−28	25	
7	B68 Toftir	27	4	11	12	29	48	−19	23	
8	ÍF	27	6	2	19	23	67	−44	20	
9	AB Argir (R)	27	5	3	19	27	63	−36	18	Relegation to 1. deild
10	TB Tvøroyri (R)	27	4	4	19	15	61	−46	16	Relegation to 1. deild

Source: Soccerway
Rules for classification: 1) Points; 2) Goal difference; 3) Goals scored.
(C) Champions; (R) Relegated

== Fixtures and results ==
Each team plays three times (either twice at home and once away or once at home and twice away) against each other team for a total of 27 matches each.

Home \ Away	ABA	B36	EBS	HAV	ÍF	KÍ	TBT	TOF	VES	VÍK	ABA	B36	EBS	HAV	ÍF	KÍ	TBT	TOF	VES	VÍK
AB Argir	—	0–2	1–3	2–4	1–0	0–2	0–0	3–1	1–2	0–4	—	3–2	—	—	—	1–1	3–0	—	2–0	—
B36 Tórshavn	2–1	—	2–1	0–2	5–1	2–3	4–0	2–0	3–2	2–1	—	—	—	0–0	1–0	0–0	—	2–0	3–1	—
EB/Streymur	2–0	1–2	—	0–3	2–1	0–2	2–1	2–0	0–5	0–2	4–1	0–3	—	0–1	—	—	0–1	—	—	—
Havnar Bóltfelag	4–0	1–0	6–1	—	4–1	0–1	4–0	4–1	2–0	1–1	5–0	—	—	—	3–1	1–2	—	3–3	—	1–2
ÍF	2–0	0–3	3–0	2–7	—	1–7	1–0	1–3	1–2	0–1	3–1	—	0–0	—	—	—	—	0–0	0–3	1–7
KÍ	2–1	2–1	1–0	2–0	1–0	—	7–1	1–1	1–1	2–0	—	—	3–2	—	5–0	—	1–0	—	—	1–2
TB Tvøroyri	3–2	0–4	0–1	0–0	0–1	1–5	—	2–1	2–1	0–2	—	0–3	—	1–4	1–2	—	—	—	0–1	—
B68 Toftir	1–0	0–1	0–0	0–2	3–1	0–5	1–1	—	2–3	3–3	2–2	—	2–2	—	—	1–2	1–1	—	—	0–3
07 Vestur	2–1	2–2	3–1	1–3	1–0	1–3	2–0	1–1	—	1–2	—	—	1–1	2–1	—	0–3	—	0–1	—	3–2
Víkingur	5–0	0–3	1–0	0–2	5–0	2–1	7–0	1–1	3–1	—	5–0	6–0	8–0	—	—	—	1–0	—	—	—

Source: Soccerway
Legend: Blue = home team win; Yellow = draw; Red = away team win.
For upcoming matches, an "a" indicates there is an article about the rivalry between the two participants.

== Top scorers ==
As of 11 August 2023

Rank	Player	Club	Goals
1	(Faroe Islands) Páll Klettskarð	KÍ	15
2	(Denmark) Mikkel Dahl	Havnar Bóltfelag	11
3	(Faroe Islands) Árni Frederiksberg	KÍ	8
4	(Faroe Islands) Sølvi Vatnhamar	Víkingur	7
4	(Faroe Islands) Adrian Justinussen	Havnar Bóltfelag	7
4	(Faroe Islands) Martin Klein	Víkingur	7
4	(Serbia) Uroš Stojanov	07 Vestur	7
4	(Latvia) Valērijs Šabala	B36 Tórshavn	7
9	(Denmark) Mads Borchers	Havnar Bóltfelag	6
9	(Faroe Islands) Bjarki Nielsen	B36 Tórshavn	6
9	(Denmark) Claes Kronberg	KÍ	6
9	(Belgium) Jasper Van Der Heyden	07 Vestur	6
9	(Ghana) Samudeen Musah	TB Tvøroyri	6

== Attendances ==
#	Club	Average
1	KÍ	810
2	B36	579
3	HB	514
4	TB	430
5	ÍF	342
6	Víkingur	328
7	AB	319
8	Vestur	302
9	B68	267
10	EB/Streymur	250
