= Ken Fagerberg =

Swedish footballer (born 1989)

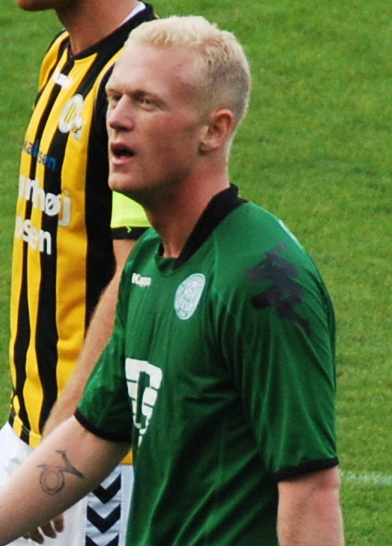

Personal information
- Full name: Ken Göran Fagerberg
- Date of birth: 9 January 1989 (age 37)
- Height: 1.85 m (6 ft 1 in)
- Position: Forward

Team information
- Current team: Royn (player-manager)
- Number: 9

Youth career
- 2006: Lindholmens BK

Senior career*
Years	Team	Apps	(Gls)
2007	Örgryte IS	22	(12)
2008–2011	Midtjylland	45	(6)
2010	→ Örgryte IS (loan)	10	(0)
2011	→ Viborg (loan)	13	(10)
2012–2013	Horsens	44	(6)
2014	Viborg	2	(0)
2014–2015	Vendsyssel	36	(7)
2016	Assyriska	14	(1)
2017–2019	07 Vestur	47	(8)
2019–2021	TB Tvøroyri	21	(1)
2022–	Royn	1	(0)

International career
2007–2008	Sweden U19	6	(4)
2008	Sweden U21	1	(0)

Managerial career
- 2021: TB Tvøroyri (player-assistant)
- 2022: Royn (staff)
- 2023–: Royn (player-manager)
- * Club domestic league appearances and goals as of 21:07, 9 January 2023 (UTC)

Ken Göran Fagerberg (born 9 January 1989) is a Swedish professional footballer who plays as a forward for Faroese club Royn Hvalba, where he also is the clubs manager.

He formerly represented Örgryte IS, Midtjylland, Viborg FF, AC Horsens, Vendsyssel FF. Assyriska FF, and TB Tvøroyri during his career.
