= Heðin Hansen =

Faroese footballer

Personal information
- Full name: Heðin Hansen
- Date of birth: 30 July 1993 (age 33)
- Place of birth: Faroe Islands
- Position: Midfielder

Team information
- Current team: HB
- Number: 4

Senior career*
Years	Team	Apps	(Gls)
2009–2010	Víkingur Gøta III	3	(1)
2009–2017	Víkingur Gøta II	90	(9)
2011–2019	Víkingur Gøta	153	(24)
2017	→ HB (loan)	11	(0)
2020–	HB	158	(7)

International career^{‡}
2009	Faroe Islands U17	3	(0)
2011	Faroe Islands U19	3	(0)
2013–2014	Faroe Islands U21	3	(0)
2020–	Faroe Islands	9	(0)
- * Club domestic league appearances and goals as of 1 November 2026 ‡ National team caps and goals as of 17 April 2023

Heðin Hansen (born 30 July 1993) is a Faroese footballer who plays as a midfielder for HB and the Faroe Islands national team.

== Career ==
Hansen made his international debut for Faroe Islands on 7 October 2020 in a friendly match against Denmark, which finished as a 0–4 away loss.

== Career statistics ==
=== International ===
As of 7 October 2020

Faroe Islands
Year	Apps	Goals
2020	1	0
Total	1	0
