= 3. deild =

Faroese association football league

- Founded: 1980
- Country: Faroe Islands
- Confederation: UEFA
- Level on pyramid: 4
- Promotion to: 2. deild
- Domestic cup: Faroe Islands Cup
- Current champions: Víkingur III (1st title)
- Most championships: HB Tórshavn III (8 titles)
- Current: 2023 3. deild

3. deild menn is the fourth tier of football in the Faroe Islands. The majority of teams participating in the league are C or D sides of other Faroese clubs. At the end of the season two teams are promoted to 2. deild. There is no relegation from the league, as 3. deild is the lowest league in the Faroese football ladder.

== Champions ==
- 1980: VB II
- 1981: HB III
- 1982: HB III
- 1983: HB III
- 1984: Streymur
- 1985: Skála
- 1986: KÍ II
- 1987: HB III
- 1988: VB II
- 1989: KÍ II
- 1990: HB III
- 1991: HB III
- 1992: VB II
- 1993: HB III
- 1994: B71 II
- 1995: KÍ IV
- 1996: KÍ IV
- 1997: GÍ III
- 1998: B68 III
- 1999: B36 III
- 2000: GÍ III
- 2001: B68 III
- 2002: Skála II
- 2003: SÍ
- 2004: HB III
- 2005: MB
- 2006: B36 III
- 2007: TB II
- 2008: B71 II
- 2009: VB/Sumba II
- 2010: B36 III
- 2011: FF Giza
- 2012: KÍ III
- 2013: B36 III
- 2014: Royn
- 2015: 07 Vestur II
- 2016: NSÍ III
- 2017: Undrið FF
- 2018: KÍ IV
- 2019: Royn
- 2020: ÍF II
- 2021: 07 Vestur III
- 2022: Víkingur III

== Teams for the 2020 season ==
=== Group A ===
- 07 Vestur II
- B36 III
- B68 III
- EB/Streymur IV
- FC Hoyvík II
- KÍ V

=== Group B ===
- EB/Streymur V
- FC Hoyvík III
- NSÍ IV
- KI VI
- Undrið II
- Víkingur IV

=== Group C ===
- B71 II
- EB/Streymur III
- KÍ IV
- NSÍ V
- Skála III
- ÍF II
