= 1. deild =

Faroese association football league

- Founded: 1943 (as Meðaldeildin); 1976
- Country: Faroe Islands
- Confederation: UEFA
- Number of clubs: 10
- Level on pyramid: 2
- Promotion to: Faroe Islands Premier League
- Relegation to: 2. deild
- Domestic cup: Faroe Islands Cup
- Current champions: Skála ÍF (4th title) (2025)
- Most championships: KÍ Klaksvík II (12 titles)
- Current: 2025 1. deild

1. deild is the second tier league of football in the Faroe Islands. It was founded in 1943. The league is organised by the Faroe Islands Football Association. It was originally the top level of Faroe Islands football but was replaced by the Faroe Islands Premier League in 2005.

The league has 10 participating clubs. At the end of each season, two teams are relegated and two promoted from the 2. deild, pending the fact that the promoted team does not already have a team in 1. deild. In such cases, the team that finished third will be promoted instead. If a team is relegated to 1. deild and already have a side playing there, their reserve team will move one division down, thereby saving another team from relegation.

== History ==
Founded in 1943 as Meðaldeildin, it acts in a system of promotion and relegation with the top division since 1976, when the Faroe Islands football league system was reorganized. Back then, 1. deild was the name given to the top division, replacing the Meistaradeildin. The first club to be promoted was Fram Tórshavn after winning the division for the first time in their history. The first team relegated to the league was NSÍ Runavík.

== 2026 teams ==
- B36 Tórshavn II
- B71 Sandoy
- EB/Streymur II
- HB II
- FC Hoyvík
- Ítróttarfelag Fuglafjarðar
- NSÍ Runavík II
- FC Suðuroy
- Tvøroyrar Bóltfelag
- Víkingur Gøta II

== List of seasons ==
Season	Champions	Runners-up	Top scorer (club)	Goals
1943	HB Tórshavn II	Not available		
1944	No tournament			
1945	KÍ Klaksvík II	Not available		
1946	Royn Hvalba	Not available		
1947	B36 Tórshavn II	Not available		
1948	TB Tvøroyri	Not available		
1949	KÍ Klaksvík II	Not available		
1950	B36 Tórshavn II	Not available		
1951	KÍ Klaksvík II	Not available		
1952	HB Tórshavn II	Not available		
1953	KÍ Klaksvík II	Not available		
1954	KÍ Klaksvík II	Not available		
1955	HB Tórshavn II	Not available		
1956	KÍ Klaksvík II	Not available		
1957	B36 Tórshavn II	Not available		
1958	HB Tórshavn II	Not available		
1959	KÍ Klaksvík II	Not available		
1960	SÍF Sandavágur	Not available		
1961	B36 Tórshavn II	Not available		
1962	B36 Tórshavn II	Not available		
1963	KÍ Klaksvík II	Not available		
1964	VB Vágur	Not available		
1965	B36 Tórshavn II	Not available		
1966	HB Tórshavn II	Not available		
1967	B36 Tórshavn II	Not available		
1968	B36 Tórshavn II	Not available		
1969	SÍF Sandavágur	Not available		
1970	SÍF Sandavágur	Not available		
1971	B36 Tórshavn II	Not available		
1972	KÍ Klaksvík II	Not available		
1973	SÍF Sandavágur	Not available		
1974	KÍ Klaksvík II	Not available		
1975	KÍ Klaksvík II	Not available		
1976	Fram Tórshavn	B68 Toftir	Not available	
1977	MB Miðvágur	HB Tórshavn II	Not available	
1978	NSÍ Runavík	Royn Hvalba	Not available	
1979	GÍ Gøta	B68 Toftir	Not available	
1980	B68 Toftir	Royn Hvalba	Not available	
1981	LÍF Leirvík	MB Miðvágur	Not available	
1982	MB Miðvágur	NSÍ Runavík	Not available	
1983	NSÍ Runavík	Royn Hvalba	Not available	
1984	ÍF Fuglafjørður	Royn Hvalba	Not available	
1985	B36 Tórshavn	Royn Hvalba	Not available	
1986	VB Vágur	ÍF Fuglafjørður	Not available	
1987	ÍF Fuglafjørður	B36 Tórshavn	Not available	
1988	B71 Sandoy	SÍF Sandavágur	Not available	
1989	MB Miðvágur	TB Tvøroyri	Not available	
1990	NSÍ Runavík	SÍ Sumba	(Faroe Islands) Gestur á Líknargøtu (NSÍ)	23
1991	B71 Sandoy	SÍF Sandavágur	(Faroe Islands) Torkil Nielsen (SÍF)	13
1992	LÍF Leirvík	ÍF Fuglafjørður	(Faroe Islands) Kaj Eli Olsen (LÍF)	17
1993	NSÍ Runavík	EB/Streymur	(Faroe Islands) Jack Jacobsen (NSÍ)	14
1994	VB Vágur	FS Vágar	(Faroe Islands) John Olsen (LÍF)	14
1995	HB Tórshavn II	ÍF Fuglafjørður	(Faroe Islands) Eyðolvur Reinert-Petersen (ÍF)	16
1996	NSÍ Runavík	HB Tórshavn II	(Faroe Islands) René Thomsen (Sumba)	15
1997	SÍ Sumba	B36 Tórshavn II	(Serbia) Aleksandar Radosavljević (TB)	23
1998	B71 Sandoy	LÍF Leirvík	(Faroe Islands) Eli Hentze (B71)	15
1999	FS Vágar	LÍF Leirvík	(Faroe Islands) Birgir Joensen (FS Vágar)	21
2000	EB/Streymur	ÍF Fuglafjørður	(Faroe Islands) Eyðun Samuelsen (HB II)	14
2001	TB Tvøroyri	Skála ÍF	(Faroe Islands) Jan Jørgensen (ÍF)	13
2002	FS Vágar	B71 Sandoy	(Faroe Islands) Birgir Jørgensen (VB II)	14
2003	ÍF Fuglafjørður	TB Tvøroyri	(Faroe Islands) Kaj Roest (TB)	12
2004	TB Tvøroyri	B71 Sandoy	(Serbia) Aleksandar Radosavljević (Royn) (Faroe Islands) Jónsvein Thomsen (B71) (Faroe Islands) Sonny Johansen (FS Vágar)	16
2005	B68 Toftir	B71 Sandoy	(Faroe Islands) Súni Fríði Johannesen (AB)	31
2006	B71 Sandoy	AB Argir	(Brazil) Clayton Nascimento (B71)	27
2007	B68 Toftir	ÍF Fuglafjørður	(Faroe Islands) Dánial Hansen (B68)	22
2008	07 Vestur	AB Argir	(Faroe Islands) Tróndur Sigurðsson (AB)	25
2009	VB/Sumba	B71 Sandoy	(Faroe Islands) Jón Krosslá Poulsen (VB/Sumba)	25
2010	07 Vestur	KÍ Klaksvík	(Faroe Islands) Jens Erik Rasmussen (07 Vestur)	17
2011	FC Suðuroy	TB Tvøroyri	(Faroe Islands) John Poulsen (FC Suðuroy)	27
2012	07 Vestur	AB Argir	(Faroe Islands) Bjartur Kjærbo (AB)	20
2013	B68 Toftir	Skála ÍF	(Faroe Islands) Jonleif Højgaard (B68)	24
2014	TB Tvøroyri	FC Suðuroy	(Faroe Islands) Patrik Johannesen (FC Suðuroy)	17
2015	Skála ÍF	B68 Toftir	(Faroe Islands) Brian Jacobsen (Skála)	32
2016	EB/Streymur	07 Vestur	(Faroe Islands) Leif Niclasen (EB/Streymur)	36
2017	AB Argir	Víkingur II	(Faroe Islands) Bjarki Nielsen (AB)	19
2018	ÍF Fuglafjørður	NSÍ Runavík II	(Faroe Islands) Jan Ellingsgaard (ÍF)	21
2019	KÍ Klaksvík II	Víkingur II	(Brazil) Clayton Nascimento (B71)	17
2020	Víkingur II	07 Vestur	(Faroe Islands) Andri Benjaminsen (B68)	18
2021	Skála ÍF	Víkingur II	(Brazil) Clayton Nascimento (B71)	20
2022	ÍF Fuglafjørður	Víkingur II	(Denmark) Mikkel Blåholm (TB)	26
2023	Skála ÍF	NSÍ	(Faroe Islands) Paul Eirik Djurhuus (Víkingur II)	10
2024	Víkingur II	FC Suðuroy	(Faroe Islands) Rani Hansen (Víkingur II)	17
2025	Skála ÍF	AB	(Denmark) Simon Jorgensen (Skála)	27

=== Performance by club ===
Team	Titles	Last title
**KÍ Klaksvík II**	12	2019
**B36 Tórshavn II**	9	1971
**HB Tórshavn II**	6	1995
NSÍ Runavík	5	1996
**07 Vestur** (Note: FC Suðuroy once won the league as a joint team with 07 Vestur as VB / Sumba.)	5	2012
**ÍF Fuglafjørður**	5	2022
**TB Tvøroyri**	4	2014
SÍF Sandavágur	4	1973
B68 Toftir	4	2013
**B71 Sandoy**	4	2006
Skála ÍF	4	2025
VB Vágur	3	1994
MB Miðvágur	3	1989
LÍF Leirvík	2	1992
EB/Streymur	2	2016
FC Suðuroy	2	2011
**Víkingur Gøta II**	2	2024
Royn Hvalba	1	1946
Fram Tórshavn	1	1976
GÍ Gøta	1	1979
B36 Tórshavn	1	1985
SÍ Sumba	1	1997
AB Argir	1	2017

In bold the clubs currently playing in 1. deild.
In italics the clubs that no longer exist or are no longer active in adult football.

== See also ==
- 2. deild
- 3. deild
