= Miðvágs Bóltfelag =

Faroese football club

MB Miðvágur
- Full name: Miðvágs Bóltfelag
- Nickname(s): MB 1905
- Founded: 21 January 1905
- Ground: MB Arena
- Capacity: 1,000
- Chairman: Elisabeth Haraldsen
- Manager: Ethan Wallbank
- League: 2. deild
- Website: http://www.mb1905.fo/
Home colours	Away colours

Miðvágs Bóltfelag, commonly known as MB, is a Faroese football club based in Miðvágur.

== History ==
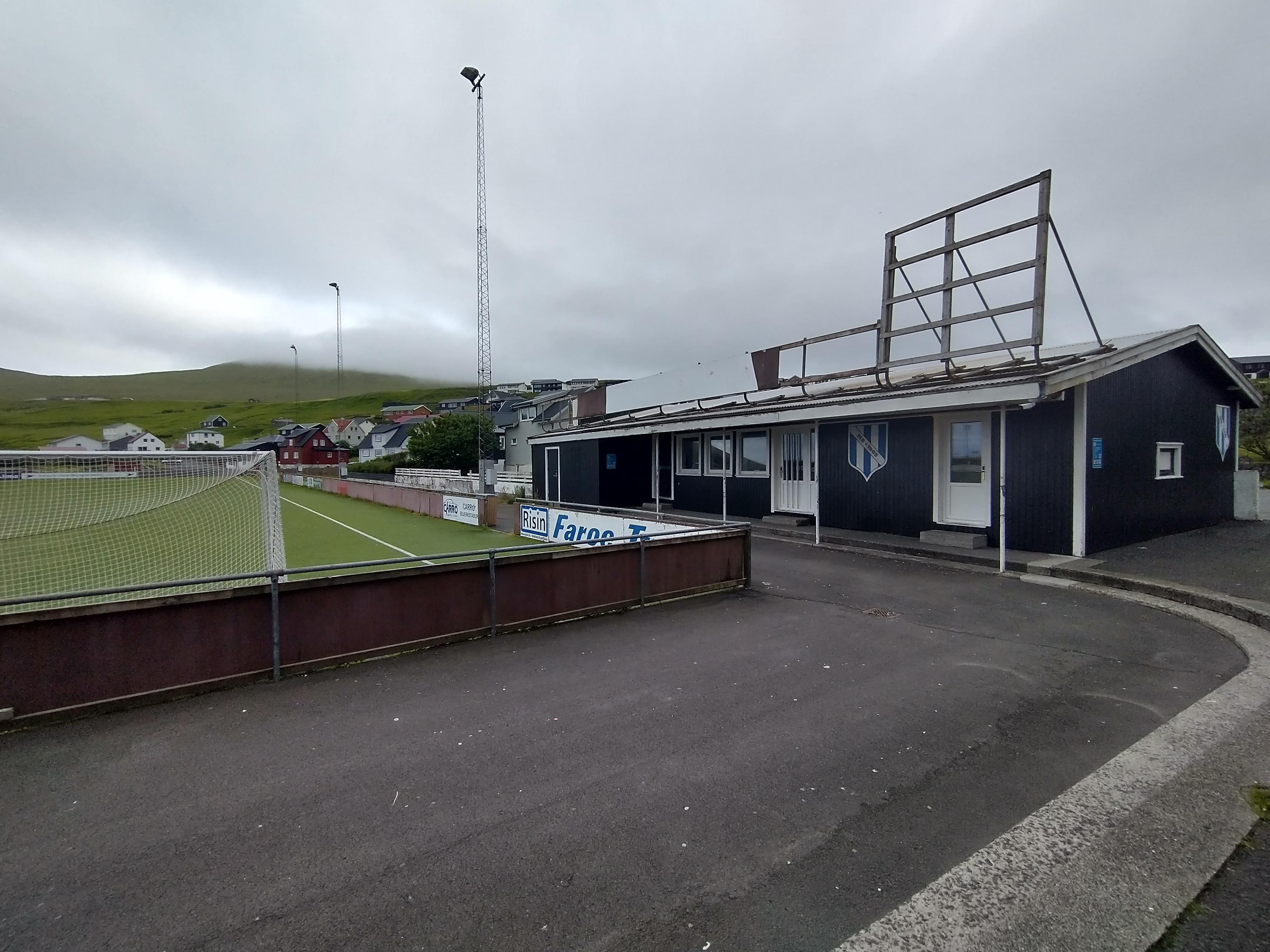
Miðvágs Bóltfelag Arena, club's home ground.

The club was established in 1905. In 1993, the club merged with SÍF Sandavágur to form FS Vágar. After the merger collapsed in 2004, MB was moved to the fourth division to start over.

In their first year as a senior club in over a decade, MB demolished all opposition in the fourth division, ending the year with a 7–2 thumping of HB's fourth division team, mainly consisting of veterans who at an earlier stage of their career had played for HB's first team. Notable figures in Faroese football, such as Gunnar Mohr and Kaj Leo Johannesen played on this team.

MB played in the Faroese 2nd division (3rd tier), after a disappointing season in 2007, ending up in seventh place.

In 2008, MB looked a more assured side and finished 3rd in Division 2, although there is still an ongoing debate whether they finished 2nd or 3rd due to the AB team finishing 2nd using illegal players.

== Honours ==
- 1. deild (2nd tier): 3
  - 1977, 1982, 1989
- 2. deild (3rd tier): 1
  - 2014
- 3. deild (4th tier): 1
  - 2005
