= Royn Hvalba =

Faroese sports association

- Full name: Bóltfelagið Royn
- Nicknames: Royn & Roynarir
- Founded: October 23, 1923; 103 years ago
- Ground: Á Skørinum; Hvalba, Faroes
- Capacity: 2,000
- Chairman: Eyðstein Jacobsen
- Manager: Vacant
- League: 3. deild
- 2021: Group Stage, 3. deild
- Website: http://www.royn.fo/
Home colours	Away colours

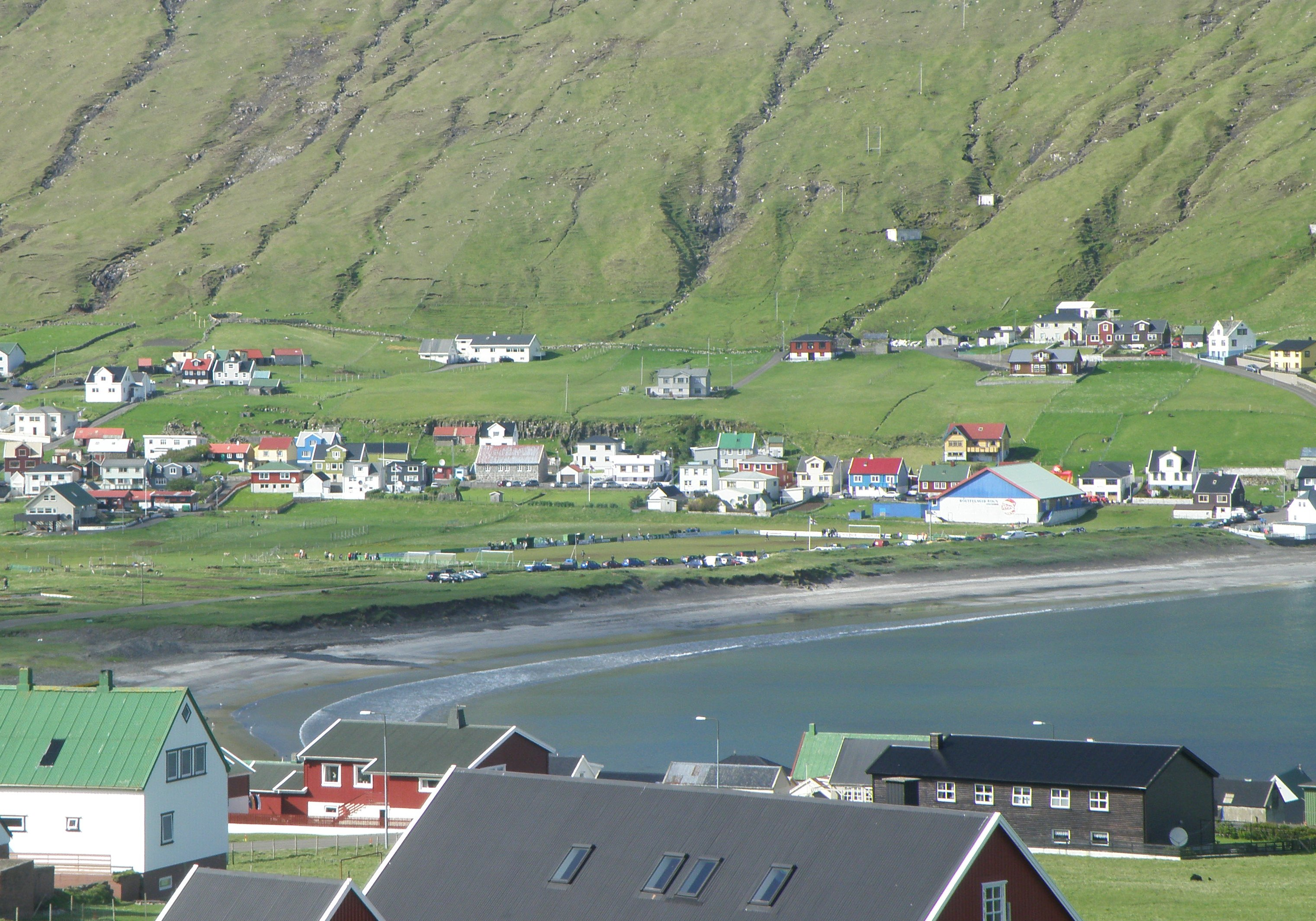
Hvalba, Á Skørinum football field and Royn Sports Hall.

Royn Hvalba or Bóltfelagið Royn, or just Royn, is a Faroese football and sports association from Hvalba in Suðuroy, founded on 23 October 1923. The chairman for Royn Hvalba is Poul Laust Christiansen. Manager is Brynjar Poulsen. Royn has a team in the Faroese second division (2. deild). Royn also has teams for girls and boys, in 2012 they had a team for girls under 12, a team for boys U8 and one for boys U10. Royn and TB Tvøroyri now have a new manager for all the youth teams of the two clubs. Men over 35 have their own team. The women had their own team earlier. Royn is one of three football associations in the island Suðuroy. The other two football clubs are FC Suðuroy with base in Vágur and TB Tvøroyri from Tvøroyri. Royn Hvalba plays its home matches on the football field in Hvalba, which is the only grass field left in the Faroe Islands (natural grass).

After the end of the 2016 season, it was decided on 15 December 2016 that the three clubs of the island Suðuroy, which are TB Tvøroyri, FC Suðuroy and Royn Hvalba would merge into a new club for the 2017 season. Since then, in 2019 the three clubs, in the island of Suđuroy, have agreed on separating again, only in the men's teams. The merger will not be complete until 2018 and the name will be all three names together for the 2017 season: TB/FC Suðuroy/Royn. The three clubs have not been dissolved yet, they continue separately for the children's and women's teams. In 2017, it will only be the men's teams which will play for the new cooperation. In Faroese, the new team is referred to as Suðuroyarliðið (the Suðuroy-team). The first head coach for the Suðuroy-team is Maurice Ross.

The teams have since dissolved. Only applying Suðuroyarliðið to the younger teams.

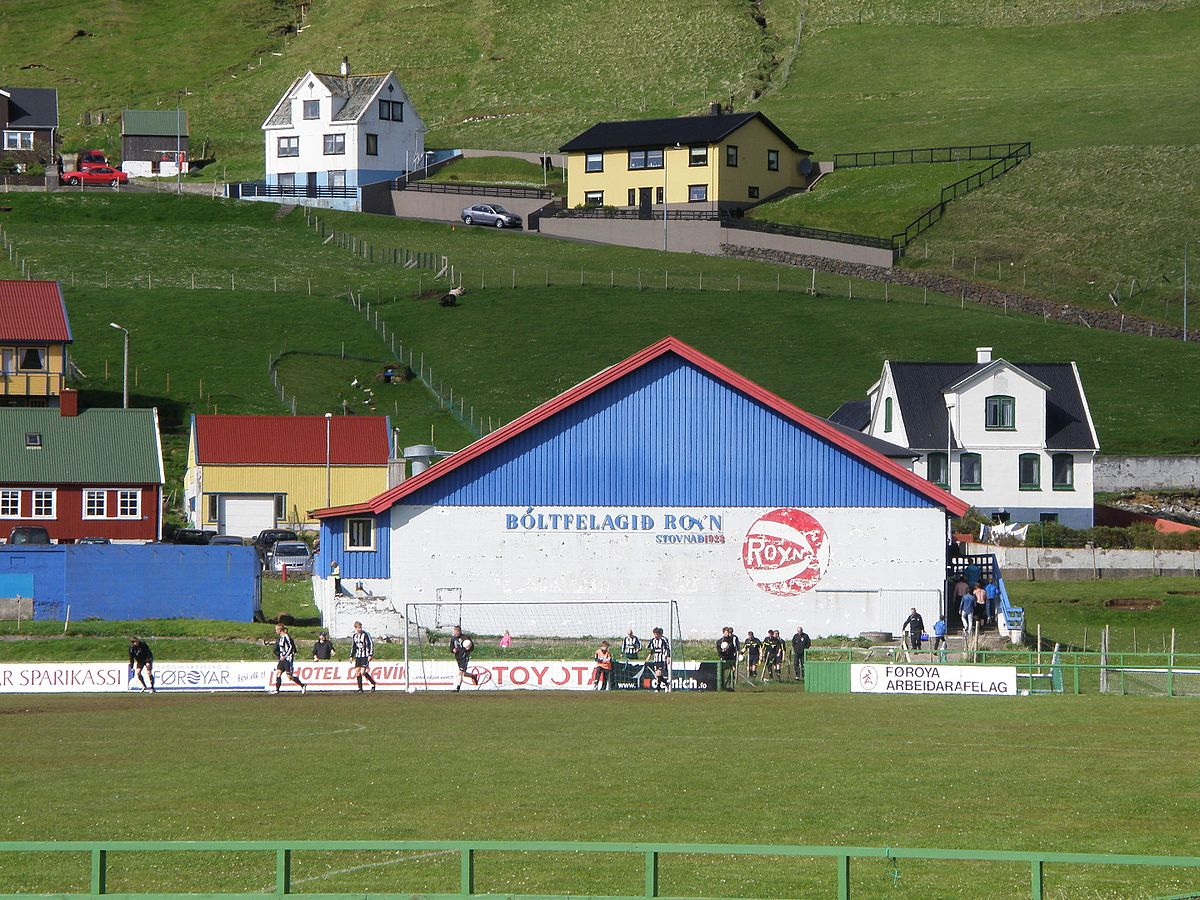
Roynhøllin

== Honours ==
- 1. deild (2nd tier): 1
  - 1946
- 2. deild (3rd tier): 3
  - 1977, 1996, 2003, 2020, 2021
- 3. deild (4th tier): 2
  - 2014, 2019, 2022

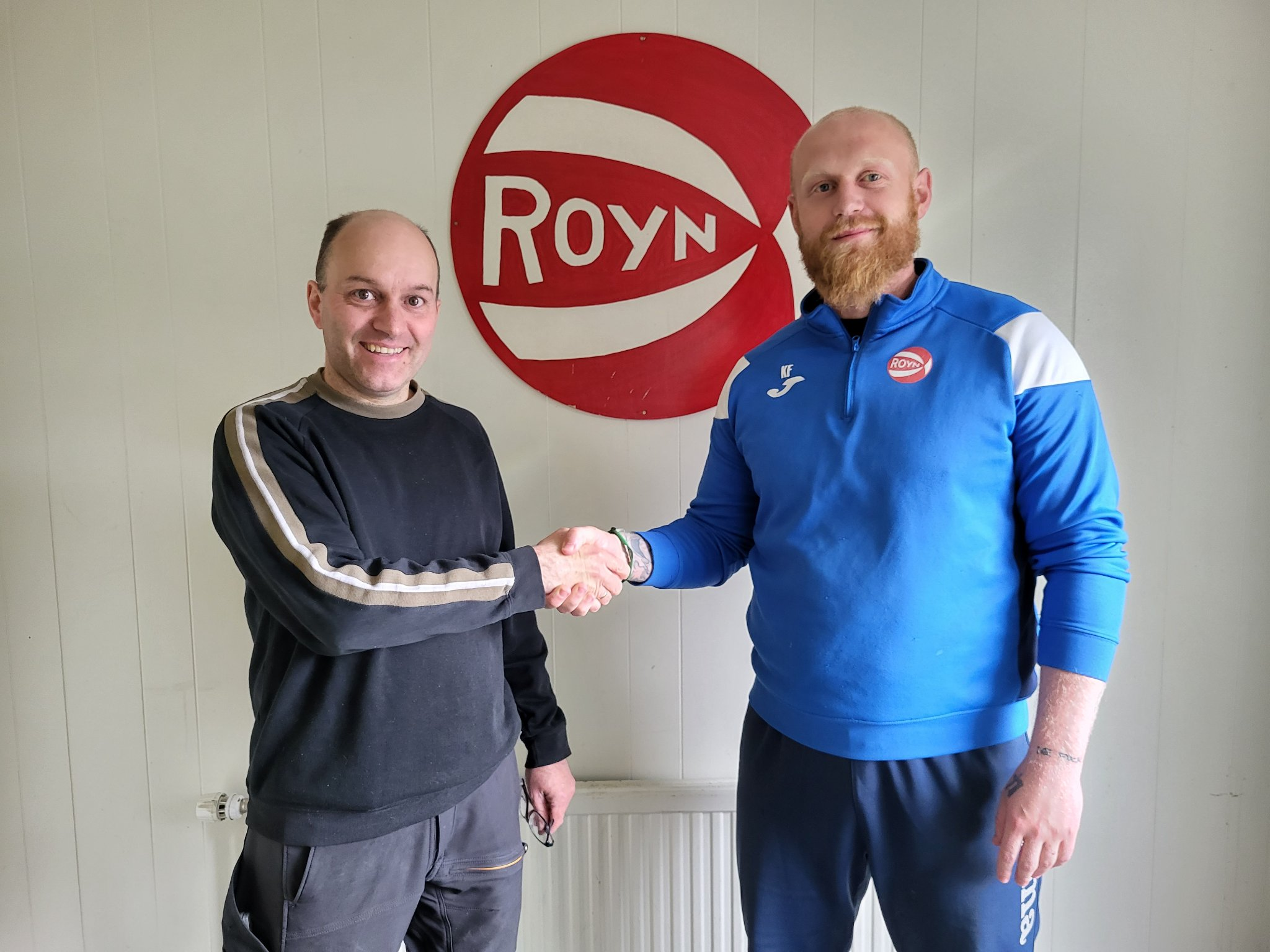
Fagerberg signs new contract with Royn

== Current squad ==
As of July 12, 2022.

Note: Flags indicate national team as defined under FIFA eligibility rules; some limited exceptions apply. Players may hold more than one non-FIFA nationality.

No.	Pos.	Nation	Player
1	GK	FRO	Olgar Nielsen
3	RB	FRO	Jón Sigurd V. Poulsen
4	DF	FRO	Oddur Norðberg
5	MF	FRO	Hartvig Thomsen
6	MF	FRO	Tórður Arnfinnur Thomsen
7	LWB	FRO	Jóan Petur Johansen
8	MF	FRO	Teitur Midjord
9	FW	FRO	Jónar Holm
12	FW	GHA	Samuel Atubrah
10	DF	FRO	Jóhan Eli Thomsen
11	MF	FRO	Chris H. Craib
13	DF	FRO	Kristian Sigurd Hádal
14	MF	FRO	Benjamin M. Midjord
15	MF	FRO	Markus Oddmundur Thomsen
16	GK	FRO	Kim Mortensen
17	MF	FRO	Janus Midjord
19	FW	FRO	Fríði Strøm
20	MF	FRO	Tórolv H. Craib
21	FW	SWE	Ken Fagerberg
