= Patrik Johannesen =

Faroese footballer (born 1995)

Personal information
- Date of birth: 7 September 1995 (age 31)
- Place of birth: Tvøroyri, Faroe Islands
- Height: 1.85 m (6 ft 1 in)
- Position: Striker

Team information
- Current team: KÍ Klaksvík
- Number: 13

Senior career*
Years	Team	Apps	(Gls)
2012	Tvøroyrar Bóltfelag	3	(0)
2013–2014	FC Suðuroy	41	(19)
2014–2015	Tvøroyrar Bóltfelag	35	(12)
2016	Argja Bóltfelag	26	(11)
2017	B36 Tórshavn	25	(16)
2017–2018	Florø	9	(2)
2019–2020	KÍ Klaksvík	50	(17)
2021	Egersund	21	(13)
2022	Keflavik	22	(12)
2023–2024	Breiðablik	22	(3)
2025–	KÍ Klaksvík	30	(15)

International career^{‡}
2015–2016	Faroe Islands U21	5	(0)
2017–	Faroe Islands	26	(2)
- * Club domestic league appearances and goals as of 1 November 2026 ‡ National team caps and goals as of 9 June 2025

Patrik Johannesen (born 7 September 1995) is a Faroese professional footballer who plays as a striker for KÍ Klaksvík, and the Faroe Islands.

== Club career ==
He has played club football for Tvøroyrar Bóltfelag, FC Suðuroy, Argja Bóltfelag, B36 Tórshavn, Florø and KÍ Klaksvík.

Johannesen left Florø by mutual consent on 18 October 2018. In 2020 he won the double with KÍ Klaksvík. In January 2021 he signed a one-year deal with Norwegian club Egersund, which plays in the third tier. On 25 January 2022 it was announced that he had signed for the Icelandic club Keflavik. He then signed for Breiðablik.

== International career ==
He made his international debut for the Faroe Islands on 31 August 2017, in their 5–1 defeat to Portugal.

== International goals ==
Scores and results list Faroe Islands' goal tally first.

No.	Date	Venue	Opponent	Score	Result	Competition
1.	29 March 2022	Pinatar Arena, Murcia, Spain	Liechtenstein	1–0	1–0	Friendly
2.	9 June 2025	Tórsvøllur, Tórshavn, Faroe Islands	Gibraltar	2–1	2–1	2026 FIFA World Cup qualification
