= Klaksvíkar Ítróttarfelag II =

Faroese football club

KÍ II
- Full name: Klaksvíkar Ítróttarfelag II
- Short name: KÍ II
- Founded: 24 August 1904; 121 years ago
- Ground: Við Djúpumýrar
- Capacity: 2,600 (530 seated)
- Chairman: Tummas Lervig
- Manager: Asbjørn Tungá
- League: 2. deild
- 2025: 1. deild, 9th of 10 (relegated)
| Home colours | Away colours |

Klaksvíkar Ítróttarfelag II, or simply KÍ II, is a Faroese football club based in Klaksvík. It is the reserve team of the Faroe Islands Premier League club KÍ Klaksvík.

Reserve teams in the Faroe Islands play in the same league system as their senior team, rather than in a reserve league, but they cannot play in the same division as their senior team, so KÍ II is ineligible for promotion to the Faroe Islands Premier League and also cannot play in the Faroe Islands Cup.

== Honours ==
- 1. deild: 11
  - 1945, 1949, 1951, 1953, 1954, 1956, 1959, 1963, 1972, 1974, 1975
- 2. deild: 3
  - 1976, 1990, 2011
- 3. deild: 2
  - 1986, 1989
