= 2. deild =

Faroese association football league

- Founded: 1976 (as 3. deild); 2005
- Country: Faroe Islands
- Confederation: UEFA
- Number of clubs: 10
- Level on pyramid: 3
- Promotion to: 1. deild
- Relegation to: 3. deild
- Domestic cup: Faroe Islands Cup
- Current champions: B68 Toftir II (4th title)
- Most championships: HB Tórshavn II; B68 Toftir II (4 titles)
- Current: 2026 2. deild

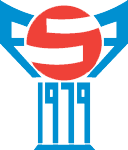
The logo of the Faroe Islands Football Association and the national football team

2. deild is the third tier league of football in the Faroe Islands. It was founded in 1976 and is organized by the Faroe Islands Football Association. It was originally called 3. deild but became 2. deild after a reorganization of the Faroe Islands football league system in 2005.

== History ==
The league was founded in 1943 and was named Meðaldeildin (The Middle Division): this was 1 year after the founding of the Meistaradeildin (The Champions Division), the original top level Faroe Islands football league. There was no automatic promotion and relegation system at the time, and the two leagues operated separately from each other. This was partly because Meðaldeildin was mostly made up of B teams from the clubs in the Meistaradeildin. In 1944 all leagues in the Faroe Islands had to be suspended due to a shortage of footballs, caused by World War II and the British occupation of the Faroe Islands. The league then resumed in 1945. From 1943 to 1975 it was called Meðaldeildin, then the league structure changed in 1976.

The Meistaradeildin was renamed 1. deild and the Meðaldeildin was renamed 2. deild. Also from that season onwards, the winner of 2. deild was promoted to 1. deild. The first club to be promoted was Fram Tórshavn after they won the division for the first time in their history, though they finished bottom of 1. deild the following season and were relegated back into 2. deild. The latest change to the league was made in 2005, when 1. deild was renamed as Formuladeildin for sponsorship reasons; 2. deild adopted the name of 1. deild; the third tier was renamed 2. deild and the fourth tier became 3. deild.

It currently has 10 participating teams. At the end of each season, two teams are relegated and two promoted from what is now the fourth tier, pending the fact that the winning team in any given division doesn't already have a team in the division it is being promoted to. In such cases the team that finished second will be promoted in its stead. If a team is relegated to a division where one of its teams are already playing, the second best team will move one division down, thereby saving another team from relegation.

At the end of the 2008 season, Fram, who were set to be renamed FC Hoyvík for the 2009 season and AB II finished in the promotion places. Fram (now FC Hoyvík) were promoted to 1. deild, while AB II would only be promoted if their 1st team finished in one of the promotion places in 1. deild. AB's first team eventually won promotion into the Vodafonedeildin, finishing runners-up in 1.Deild. However, AB II were denied promotion to 1. deild and MB Midvágur who finished 3rd in 2. deild, were promoted instead. Because AB II who finished 2nd, had used illegal players. Though there is still an ongoing debate whether they finished 2nd or 3rd and which team should have been promoted. The following season in 2009 MB Midvágur finished bottom in 1. deild, only picking up 8 points and were relegated back into 2. deild. Meanwhile AB Argir II won the 2. deild in 2009 and were promoted to 1. deild.

== 2. deild seasons ==
Season	Winner	Runner-up	3rd Place	Top goalscorer
1976	KÍ II			
1977	Royn Hvalba			
1978	SÍ Sørvágur			
1979	TB II			
1980	Leirvík ÍF			
1981	SÍF Sandavágur			
1982	SÍ Sumba			
1983	HB II			
1984	VB II			
1985	EB Eiði			
1986	B71 Sandoy			
1987	**SÍ Sørvágur**	**Skála ÍF**	HB Tórshavn II	
1988	**GÍ Gøta II**	**B36 Tórshavn II**	TB Tvøroyri II	
1989	**Fram Tórshavn**	**Royn Hvalba**	ÍF Fuglafjørður II	
1990	**KÍ Klaksvík II**	**Streymur**	TB Tvøroyri II	
1991	**HB Tórshavn II**	**EB Eiði**	B36 Tórshavn II	
1992	**B68 Toftir II**	NSÍ Runavík II	**Streymur**	
1993	**HB Tórshavn II**	**NSÍ Runavík II**	ÍF Fuglafjørður II	
1994	**HB Tórshavn III**	**FS Vágar II**	GÍ Gøta II	(Faroe Islands) Rodmund Rasmussen (FS Vágar II, 24 goals)
1995	**B68 Toftir II**	**Skála ÍF**	B71 Sandoy II	(Faroe Islands) Petur Gaardlykke (B68 II, 27 goals)
1996	**Royn Hvalba**	**B36 Tórshavn II**	GÍ Gøta II	(Faroe Islands) Odd Eliasen (ÍF II, 21 goals)
1997	**GÍ Gøta II**	**NSÍ Runavík II**	VB Vágur II	(Faroe Islands) Heini Heinason (GÍ II, 28 goals)
1998	**Skála ÍF**	GÍ Gøta III	B68 Toftir II	(Faroe Islands) Bogi Gregersen (Skála, 19 goals)
1999	**B36 Tórshavn II**	**B68 Toftir II**	ÍF Fuglafjørður II	(Faroe Islands) Tórálvur Poulsen (B36 II, 18 goals)
2000	**Skála ÍF**	B36 Tórshavn III	B71 Sandoy II	(Faroe Islands) Svend Eli Poulsen (AB, 22 goals)
2001	**VB Vágur II**	Royn Hvalba	ÍF Fuglafjørður II	(Faroe Islands) Allan Michelsen (Royn, 18 goals)
2002	**AB Argir**	**B68 Toftir II**	GÍ Gøta II	(Faroe Islands) Johnny Samuelsen (AB, 11 goals)
2003	**Royn Hvalba**	GÍ Gøta II	EB/Streymur II	(Faroe Islands) Gisli Sveinbjørnsson (Royn, 18 goals)
2004	**GÍ Gøta II**	**HB Tórshavn II**	SÍ Sørvágur	(Faroe Islands) Heini Gaard (HB II, 20 goals)
2005	**SÍ Sørvágur**	**KÍ Klaksvík II**	B68 Toftir II	(Faroe Islands) Jens Erik Rasmussen (SÍ, 14 goals)
2006	**NSÍ Runavík II**	**B36 Tórshavn II**	EB Streymur II	(Faroe Islands) Fróði Jóanesarson (NSÍ II, 15 goals)
2007	**B68 Toftir II**	**GÍ Gøta II**	EB/Streymur II	(Faroe Islands) Leif Niclasen (EB/Streymur II, 16 goals)
2008	**Fram Tórshavn**	AB Argir II	**MB Miðvágur**	(Faroe Islands) Jørgen Meitilberg (Fram, 20 goals)
2009	**AB Argir II**	07 Vestur II	**EB/Streymur II**	(Faroe Islands) Karl Jóhan Djurhuus (07 Vestur II, 16 goals)
2010	**Skála ÍF**	**FC Hoyvík II**	07 Vestur II	(Faroe Islands) Karl Jóhan Djurhuus (07 Vestur II, 18 goals)
2011	**KÍ Klaksvík II**	**B68 Toftir II**	B36 Tórshavn II	(Faroe Islands) Bjarki Vágstún (KÍ II, 14 goals) (Faroe Islands) Búi í Hjøllum (B68 II, 14 goals)
2012	**B36 Tórshavn II**	TB Tvøroyri II	Giza Hoyvík	(Faroe Islands) Jákup T. Joensen (B36 II, 19 goals)
2013	**AB Argir II**	**NSÍ Runavík II**	Giza Hoyvík	(Faroe Islands) Debes Danielsen (NSÍ II, 20 goals)
2014	**MB Miðvágur**	**B71 Sandoy**	Giza Hoyvík	(Faroe Islands) Otto Jacobsen (MB, 18 goals)
2015	**HB Tórshavn II**	**Giza Hoyvík**	KÍ Klaksvík III	(Faroe Islands) Lindi Gardar (KÍ III, 21 goals)
2016	**B36 Tórshavn II**	**ÍF Fuglafjørður II**	Skála II	(Serbia) Nenad Šarić (ÍF II, 16 goals)
2017	**B71 Sandoy**	**Skála II**	Víkingur III	(Faroe Islands) Símin Hansen (B71, 17 goals)
2018	**EB/Streymur II**	**B36 Tórshavn II**	Undrið FF	(Faroe Islands) Andras Dalbø (Víkingur III, 17 goals)
2019	**FC Hoyvík**	**AB Argir II**	FC Suðuroy	(Faroe Islands) Andras Dalbø (Víkingur III, 13 goals) (Faroe Islands) Dávid Lisberg (FC Suðuroy, 13 goals) (Faroe Islands) Hans Jákup Annfinsson (AB II, 13 goals) (Faroe Islands) Hugin Ferber (FC Hoyvík, 13 goals)
2020	**Skála II**	**FC Suðuroy**	EB/Streymur II	(Faroe Islands) Ari Poulsen (Suðuroy, 20 goals)
2021	**Undrið FF**	ÍF II	07 Vestur II	(Faroe Islands) Hugin Ferber (FC Hoyvík, 19 goals)
2022	**B68 Toftir II**	Skála II	**EB/Streymur II**	(Faroe Islands) Óli Olsen (B68 II, 16 goals)
2023	**FC Suduroy**	**NSÍ II**	Skála ÍF II	(Faroe Islands) Frídi Holm (FC Suduroy, 26 goals)
2024	**07 Vestur II**	**Víkingur Göta III**	EB/Streymur II	(Faroe Islands) Rúnar Johnsson (Royn Hvalba, 17 goals)
2025	**HB Tórshavn II**	**FC Hoyvík**	AB Argir II	(Faroe Islands) Karstin Justesen (Skála IF II, 10 goals)

Clubs in bold were promoted.

=== Titles by team ===
Team	Titles	Last title
HB Tórshavn II	5	2025
B68 Toftir II	5	2022
B36 Tórshavn II	3	2016
KÍ Klaksvík II	3	2011
Skála ÍF	3	2010
SÍ Sørvágur	3	2005
GÍ Gøta II	3	2004
**Royn Hvalba**	3	2003
B71 Sandoy	2	2017
**AB Argir II**	2	2013
Fram Tórshavn	2	2008
VB Vágur II	2	2001
FC Hoyvík	1	2019
**EB/Streymur II**	1	2018
MB Miðvágur	1	2014
NSÍ Runavík II	1	2006
AB Argir	1	2002
HB Tórshavn III	1	1994
EB Eiði	1	1985
SÍ Sumba	1	1982
SÍF Sandavágur	1	1981
Leirvík ÍF	1	1980
**TB Tvøroyri II**	1	1979
**Skála II**	1	2020
**Undrið FF**	1	2021

Clubs that are in bold are currently playing in 2. deild. Clubs in italics no longer exist.
