= Havnar Bóltfelag II =

- Full name: Havnar Bóltfelag II
- Founded: 4 October 1904; 121 years ago
- Ground: Gundadalur, Tórshavn, Faroe Islands
- Capacity: 5,000
- Chairman: Kaj Leo Johannesen
- Manager: Teitur Gestsson
- League: 1. deild
- 2025: 2. deild, 1st of 11 (champions; promoted)
Home colours	Away colours

Havnar Bóltfelag II, or simply HB II, is a Faroese football club based in Tórshavn. It is the reserve team of the Faroe Islands Premier League club Havnar Bóltfelag.

Reserve teams in the Faroe Islands play in the same league system as their senior team, rather than in a reserve league, but they cannot play in the same division as their senior team, so HB II is ineligible for promotion to the Faroe Islands Premier League and also cannot play in the Faroe Islands Cup.

In the past, however, the team participated in the top division for two seasons, in 1948 and 1949.

== Honours ==
- 1. deild: 6
  - 1943, 1952, 1955, 1958, 1966, 1995
- 2. deild: 5
  - 1983, 1991, 1993, 2015, 2025
