= Við Løkin =

Sports venue in Runavík, Faroe Islands

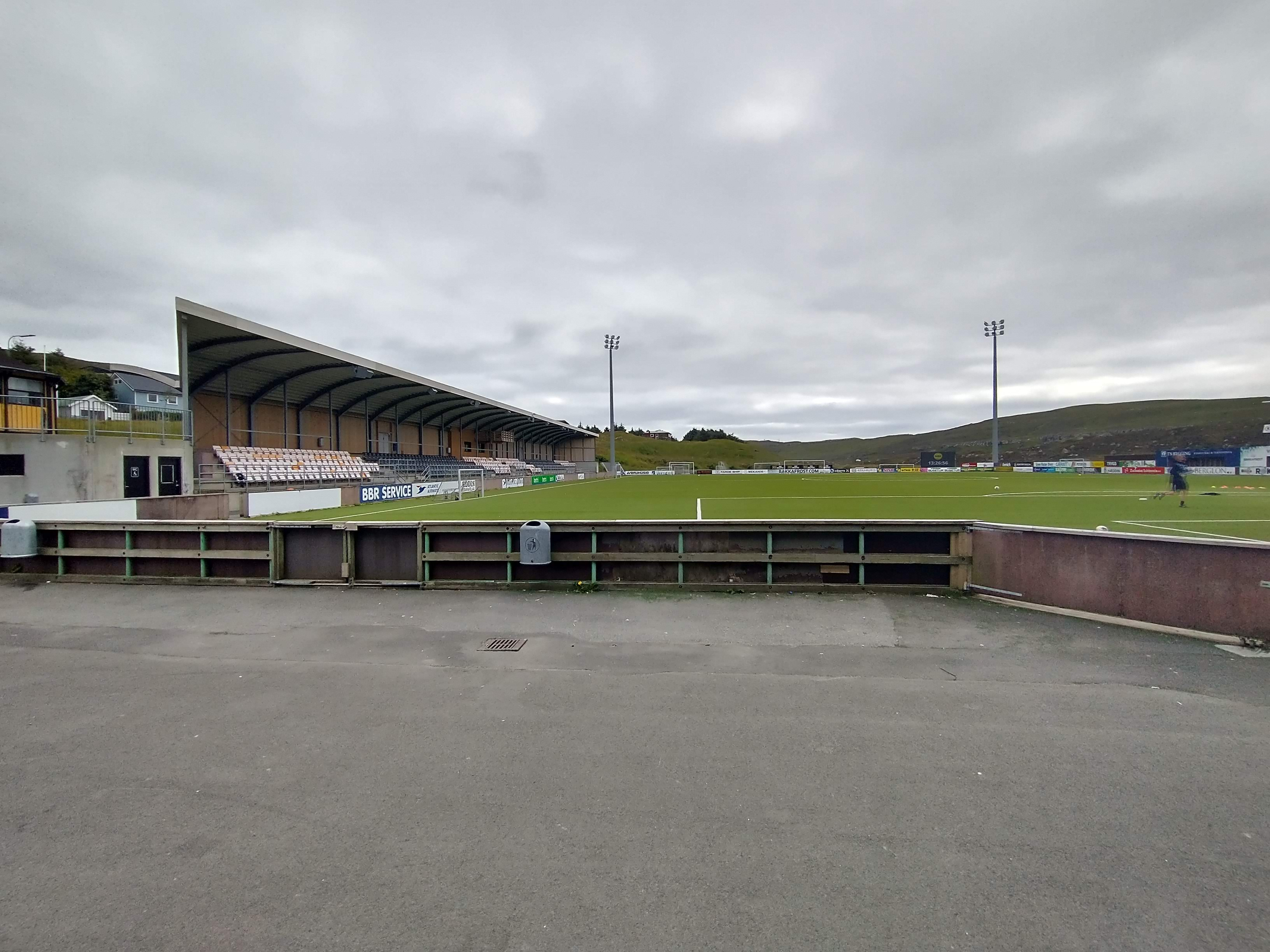
- Interactive map of Við Løkin
- Location: Runavík, Faroe Islands
- Coordinates: 62°6′21″N 6°43′24″W
- Capacity: 1,500 (450 seats)
- Surface: Artificial turf

Tenants
- NSÍ Runavík

Við Løkin is a stadium in Runavík, Faroe Islands. It is currently used mostly for football matches and is the home ground of NSÍ Runavík. The stadium holds 1,500 people.
