= Sarpugerði =

Stadium in Norðragøta, Faroe Islands

Coordinates: 62.1995°N 6.7457°W

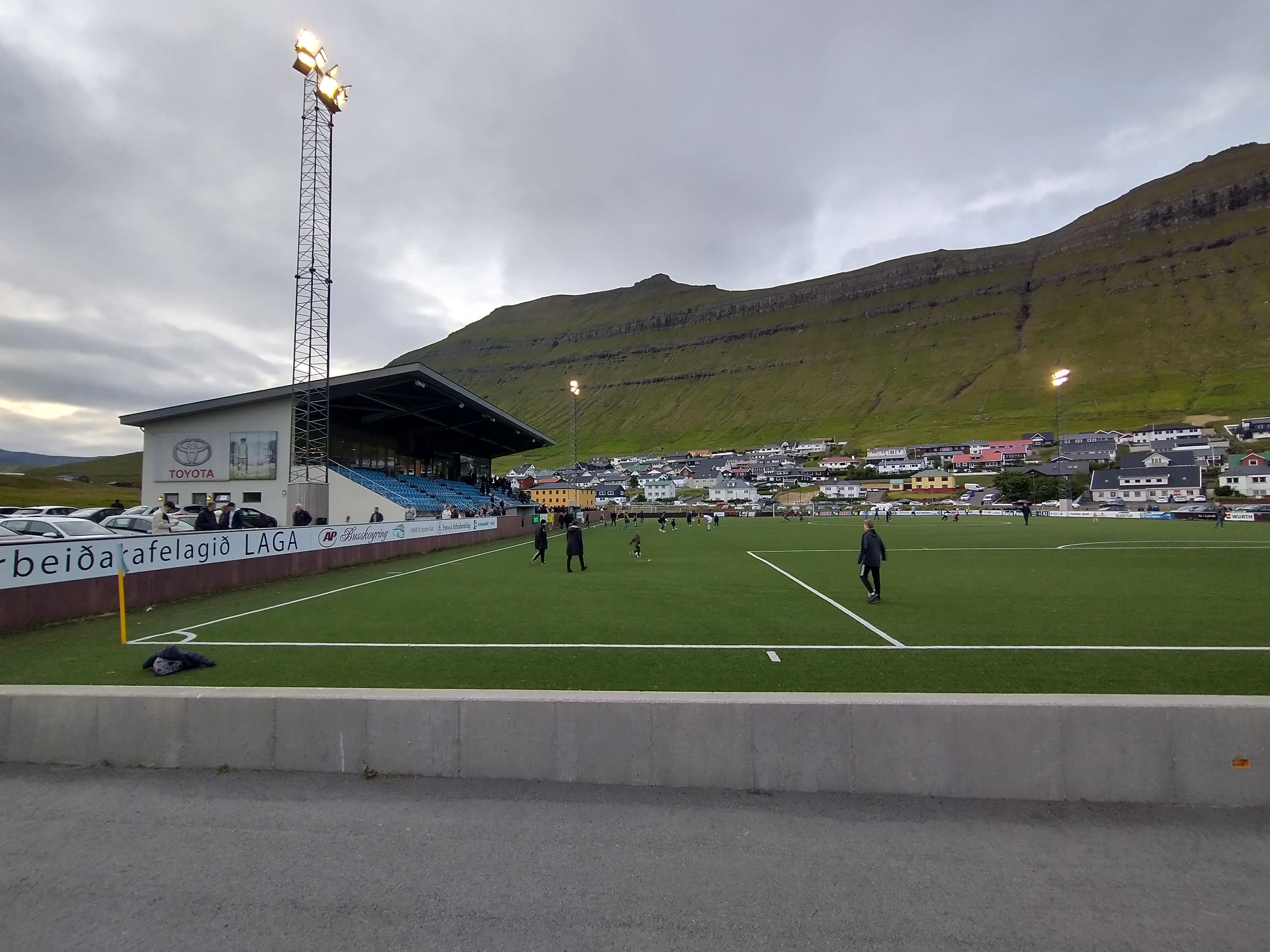
Sarpugerði just after the match Víkingur Gøta - B36 (1-0) august 2nd, 2021

Sarpugerði is a stadium in Norðragøta, Faroe Islands. It is currently used mostly for football matches and is the home ground of Víkingur Gøta and has a capacity of 3,000, of which 445 are seats.
