= 2001 Faroe Islands Cup =

Tournament details
- Country: Faroe Islands
- Teams: 18

Final positions
- Champions: B36 Tórshavn
- Runners-up: KÍ Klaksvík

Tournament statistics
- Matches played: 50
- Top goal scorer: Christian H. Jacobsen (9 goals)

The 2001 Faroe Islands Cup was played between 3 March and 29 July 2001. The cup was won by B36 Tórshavn.

== Preliminary round ==
The matches were played on 3, 7 and 11 March 2001.

Team 1	Score	Team 2
LÍF	1–3	AB
ÍF	4–0	Skála ÍF
TB	10–1	Royn Hvalba
SÍ Sumba	8–1	Fram

== First round ==
The matches were played on 15 and 16 March 2001.

Team 1	Score	Team 2
AB	0–4	LÍF
TB	6–3	SÍ Sumba

== Second round ==
The second round (group stage) was played between 17 March and 19 April 2001.

=== Group 1 ===
Pos	Team	Pld	W	D	L	GF	GA	GD	Pts	Qualification	B68	KÍ	ÍF	B71
1	B68 Toftir	6	5	1	0	11	2	+9	16	Advanced to quarter-finals		1–1	2–0	3–0
2	KÍ Klaksvík	6	4	1	1	12	4	+8	13	Advanced to quarter-finals	0–1		4–1	4–0
3	ÍF Fuglafjørður	6	2	0	4	9	11	−2	6	Advanced to quarter-finals	1–2	0–1		4–12
4	B71 Sandoy	6	0	0	6	3	18	−15	0		0–2	1–2	0–3	

=== Group 2 ===
Pos	Team	Pld	W	D	L	GF	GA	GD	Pts	Qualification	HB	GÍ	B36	TB
1	HB Tórshavn	6	4	2	0	24	8	+16	14	Advanced to quarter-finals		4–2	1–1	1–0
2	GÍ Gøta	6	3	1	2	23	12	+11	10	Advanced to quarter-finals	1–3		4–1	7–1
3	B36 Tórshavn	6	2	3	1	14	9	+5	9	Advanced to quarter-finals	1–1	2–2		7–0
4	TB Tvøroyri	6	0	0	6	6	38	−32	0		3–14	1–7	1–2	

=== Group 3 ===
Pos	Team	Pld	W	D	L	GF	GA	GD	Pts	Qualification	NSÍ	VB	EBS	FS
1	NSÍ Runavík	6	4	2	0	24	8	+16	14	Advanced to quarter-finals		2–1	2–0	5–2
2	VB Vágur	6	3	1	2	23	12	+11	10	Advanced to quarter-finals	1–2		4–1	5–1
3	EB/Streymur	6	2	3	1	14	9	+5	9		0–2	0–4		1–0
4	FS Vágar	6	0	0	6	6	38	−32	0		3–1	0–2	1–1	

== Quarter-finals ==
The matches were played on 22 April 2001.

Team 1	Score	Team 2
HB	4–1	VB
NSÍ	0–0 (a.e.t.); 4–3 (p)	GÍ
B68	2–3	B36
KÍ	2–1	ÍF

== Semi-finals ==
The first legs were played on 13 May and the second legs on 24 May 2001.

Team 1	Agg.	Team 2	1st leg	2nd leg
KÍ	3–3 (a)	NSÍ	1–1	2–2
B36	3–2	HB	3–1	0–1

== Final ==
29 July 2001

B36	1–0	KÍ
Hansen 68'

Tórsvøllur, Tórshavn
Referee: Niklas á Líðarenda
