= 2005 Faroe Islands Cup =

Tournament details
- Country: Faroe Islands
- Teams: 21

Final positions
- Champions: GÍ Gøta
- Runners-up: ÍF Fuglafjørður

Tournament statistics
- Matches played: 22
- Goals scored: 71 (3.23 per match)
- Top goal scorer: Hansmar Poulsen (5 goals)

The 2005 Faroe Islands Cup was played between 5 March and 29 July 2005. The cup was won by GÍ Gøta.

== Preliminary round ==
The match was played on 5 March 2005.

Team 1	Score	Team 2
Royn Hvalba	0–1	FS Vágar 2004

== First round ==
The matches were played between 13 and 19 March 2005.

Team 1	Score	Team 2
SÍ Sumba	w/o^{1}	MB Miðvágur
NÍF Nólsoy	0–13	Fram Tórshavn
SÍ Sørvágur	2–3	FS Vágar 2004
LÍF Leirvík	2–0	AB Argir

Notes

- Note 1: The SÍ Sumba ceased to exist in the period between the announcement of the participants of the 1st round of the qualifying round and the match that was supposed to take place there. The club merged with VB Vágur to form VB/Sumba.

== Second round ==
The matches were played on 19, 20 and 22 March 2005 except for the VB/Sumba – ÍF Fuglafjørður match, which was postponed and was played on 20 April 2005.

Team 1	Score	Team 2
MB Miðvágur	0–2	B71 Sandoy
HB Tórshavn	3–2	NSÍ Runavík
EB/Streymur	0–1	B68 Toftir
FS Vágar 2004	1–2 (a.e.t.)	TB Tvøroyri
Skála ÍF	w/o^{1}	B36 Tórshavn
Fram Tórshavn	w/o^{1}	KÍ Klaksvík
LÍF Leirvík	2–4	GÍ Gøta
VB/Sumba	0–1	ÍF Fuglafjørður

Notes

- Note 1: The matches of Skála ÍF against B36 Tórshavn and Fram Tórshavn against KÍ Klaksvík ended in victory for the home teams due to B36 Tórshavn and KÍ Klaksvík fielding ineligible players.

== Quarter-finals ==
The matches were played on 5 May 2005.

Team 1	Score	Team 2
TB Tvøroyri	2–4 (a.e.t.)	B71 Sandoy
GÍ Gøta	3–1	Skála ÍF
HB Tórshavn	0–1	ÍF Fuglafjørður
B68 Toftir	2–1	Fram Tórshavn

== Semi-finals ==
The first legs were played on 6 July and the second legs on 24 July 2005.

Team 1	Agg.	Team 2	1st leg	2nd leg
B71 Sandoy	2–7	GÍ Gøta	1–5	1–2
ÍF Fuglafjørður	3–1	B68 Toftir	2–1	1–0

== Final ==
29 July 2005

GÍ Gøta	4–1	ÍF Fuglafjørður
H. Jacobsen 31', 44', 86'; Petersen 83'	Report	Nielsen 74'

Tórsvøllur, Thorshavn
Referee: Birgir Sondum
