= 1997 Faroe Islands Cup =

Tournament details
- Country: Faroe Islands
- Teams: 20

Final positions
- Champions: GÍ Gøta
- Runners-up: VB Vágur

Tournament statistics
- Matches played: 61
- Goals scored: 344 (5.64 per match)
- Top goal scorer: Uni Arge (21 goals)

The 1997 Faroe Islands Cup was played between 16 March and 3 August 1997. The cup was won by GÍ Gøta.

== First round ==
The matches were played on 16 March 1997.

Team 1	Score	Team 2
Fram	0–2	LÍF
SÍ Sumba	20–0	AB
Royn Hvalba	w/o	SÍ Sørvágur
NÍF Nólsoy	4–7	Skála ÍF

== Second round ==
The second round (group stage) was played between 23 March and 20 April 1997.

=== Group 1 ===
Pos	Team	Pld	W	D	L	GF	GA	GD	Pts	Qualification	B36	VB	FSV	SKÁ
1	B36 Tórshavn	6	5	1	0	39	4	+35	16	Advanced to quarter-finals		5–2	3–0	14–0
2	VB Vágur	6	4	1	1	24	6	+18	13	Advanced to quarter-finals	1–1		2–0	9–0
3	FS Vágar	6	1	1	4	9	16	−7	4		1–3	0–4		2–2
4	Skála ÍF	6	0	1	5	5	50	−45	1		0–13	0–6	2–6	

=== Group 2 ===
Pos	Team	Pld	W	D	L	GF	GA	GD	Pts	Qualification	KÍ	B68	ROY	ÍF
1	KÍ Klaksvík	6	5	0	1	13	6	+7	15	Advanced to quarter-finals		0–1	2–1	2–1
2	B68 Toftir	6	4	0	2	16	6	+10	12	Advanced to quarter-finals	1–3		9–1	3–0
3	Royn Hvalba	6	2	0	4	9	24	−15	6		1–3	1–0		4–3
4	ÍF Fuglafjørður	6	1	0	5	13	15	−2	3		1–3	1–2	7–1	

=== Group 3 ===
Pos	Team	Pld	W	D	L	GF	GA	GD	Pts	Qualification	HB	TB	EBS	SÍ
1	HB Tórshavn	6	6	0	0	59	6	+53	18	Advanced to quarter-finals		14–1	10–0	4–0
2	TB Tvøroyri	6	4	0	2	21	24	−3	12	Advanced to quarter-finals	3–5		2–1	5–2
3	EB/Streymur	6	2	0	4	6	31	−25	6		1–13	1–5		2–1
4	SÍ Sumba	6	0	0	6	5	30	−25	0		1–13	1–5	0–1	

=== Group 4 ===
Pos	Team	Pld	W	D	L	GF	GA	GD	Pts	Qualification	NSÍ	GÍ	B71	LÍF
1	NSÍ Runavík	6	5	1	0	22	7	+15	16	Advanced to quarter-finals		4–2	4–1	1–0
2	GÍ Gøta	6	4	1	1	25	10	+15	13	Advanced to quarter-finals	2–2		6–2	6–1
3	B71 Sandoy	6	2	0	4	11	25	−14	6		0–7	1–4		4–2
4	Leirvík ÍF	6	0	0	6	7	23	−16	0		2–4	0–5	2–3	

== Quarter-finals ==
The matches were played on 8 May 1997.

Team 1	Score	Team 2
KÍ	0–1	VB
HB	2–2 (a.e.t.); 3–4 (p)	GÍ
B36	8–0	TB
NSÍ	3–1	B68

== Semi-finals ==
The first legs were played on 5 June and the second legs on 2 July 1997.

Team 1	Agg.	Team 2	1st leg	2nd leg
VB	3–1	B36	2–1	1–0
GÍ	9–4	NSÍ	6–2	3–2

== Final ==
3 August 1997

GÍ	6–0	VB
Sá. Joensen 14'; H. Jarnskor 19', 47', 57'; P. Jarnskor 23'; Hansen 36'

Gundadalur, Tórshavn
Referee: Kim Ejdesgaard
