= 1996 Faroe Islands Cup =

Tournament details
- Country: Faroe Islands
- Teams: 21

Final positions
- Champions: GÍ Gøta
- Runners-up: HB Tórshavn

Tournament statistics
- Matches played: 62
- Goals scored: 333 (5.37 per match)
- Top goal scorer: Kurt Mørkøre (19 goals)

The 1996 Faroe Islands Cup was played between 17 March and 8 September 1996. The cup was won by GÍ Gøta.

== Preliminary round ==
The matches were played on 17 March 1996.

Team 1	Score	Team 2
Fram	4–3	Æsir Vestmanna
AB	2–3	Skansin Tórshavn

== First round ==
The matches were played on 23 and 24 March 1996.

Team 1	Score	Team 2
Skála ÍF	3–11	LÍF
Skansin Tórshavn	0–4	Royn Hvalba
SÍ Sørvágur	3–1	Fram

== Second round ==
The second round (group stage) was played between 30 March and 3 May 1996.

=== Group 1 ===
Pos	Team	Pld	W	D	L	GF	GA	GD	Pts	Qualification	B36	B71	SÍ	TB
1	B36 Tórshavn	6	5	0	1	32	6	+26	15	Advanced to quarter-finals		2–3	16–1	4–0
2	B71 Sandoy	6	5	0	1	20	8	+12	15	Advanced to quarter-finals	0–1		4–0	4–3
3	SÍ Sørvágur	6	2	0	4	9	32	−23	6		1–5	0–4		5–2
4	TB Tvøroyri	6	0	0	6	9	24	−15	0		1–4	2–5	1–2	

=== Group 2 ===
Pos	Team	Pld	W	D	L	GF	GA	GD	Pts	Qualification	GÍ	VB	FSV	LÍF
1	GÍ Gøta	6	6	0	0	30	3	+27	18	Advanced to quarter-finals		6–0	5–1	5–1
2	VB Vágur	6	3	0	3	20	12	+8	9	Advanced to quarter-finals	0–2		6–1	7–0
3	FS Vágar	6	3	0	3	14	23	−9	9		0–7	2–1		3–1
4	Leirvík ÍF	6	0	0	6	7	33	−26	0		1–5	1–6	3–7	

=== Group 3 ===
Pos	Team	Pld	W	D	L	GF	GA	GD	Pts	Qualification	ÍF	B68	NSÍ	ROY
1	ÍF Fuglafjørður	6	4	1	1	14	7	+7	13	Advanced to quarter-finals		2–0	3–2	4–0
2	B68 Toftir	6	4	1	1	12	5	+7	13	Advanced to quarter-finals	2–1		2–0	3–0
3	NSÍ Runavík	6	2	2	2	19	9	+10	8		2–2	1–1		5–1
4	Royn Hvalba	6	0	0	6	3	27	−24	0		1–2	1–4	0–9	

=== Group 4 ===
Pos	Team	Pld	W	D	L	GF	GA	GD	Pts	Qualification	KÍ	HB	SÍS	EBS
1	KÍ Klaksvík	6	6	0	0	34	2	+32	18	Advanced to quarter-finals		3–0	12–0	4–0
2	HB Tórshavn	5	3	0	2	18	7	+11	9	Advanced to quarter-finals	1–3		8–0	4–1
3	SÍ Sumba	6	2	0	4	6	32	−26	6		0–6	0–5		2–1
4	EB/Streymur	5	0	0	5	3	20	−17	0		1–6		0–4	

== Quarter-finals ==
The matches were played on 16 May 1996.

Team 1	Score	Team 2
KÍ	8–1	B71
ÍF	0–1	VB
GÍ	4–0	B68
B36	1–4	HB

== Semi-finals ==
The first legs were played on 5 June and the second legs on 28 and 29 June 1996.

Team 1	Agg.	Team 2	1st leg	2nd leg
VB	2–4	GÍ	2–1	0–3
KÍ	6–6; 2–4 (p)	HB	1–1	5–5 (a.e.t.)

== Final ==
4 August 1996

GÍ	2–2 (a.e.t.)	HB
Jarnskor 93'; Justinussen 120'		Danielsen 104'; Slyne 119'

Gundadalur, Tórshavn
Referee: Lassin Isaksen

=== Replay ===
8 September 1996

HB	5–3 (a.e.t.)	GÍ
Justinussen 45', 105'; Petersen 86'; Justinussen 98'; Højgaard 102'		Arge 16', 120'; Danielsen 18'

Gundadalur, Tórshavn
Referee: Lassin Isaksen
