= 2000 Faroe Islands Cup =

Tournament details
- Country: Faroe Islands
- Teams: 18

Final positions
- Champions: GÍ Gøta
- Runners-up: HB Tórshavn

Tournament statistics
- Matches played: 50
- Goals scored: 160 (3.2 per match)
- Top goal scorer: Jákup á Borg (7 goals)

The 2000 Faroe Islands Cup was played between 12 March and 2 July 2000. The cup was won by GÍ Gøta.

== Preliminary round ==
The matches were played on 12 and 17 March 2000.

Team 1	Score	Team 2
ÍF	7–0	AB
Royn Hvalba	w/o	Skála ÍF
LÍF	9–1	Fram
TB	2–0	EB/Streymur

== First round ==
The matches were played on 19 March 2000.

Team 1	Score	Team 2
TB	2–0	LÍF
Royn Hvalba	0–2	ÍF

== Second round ==
The second round (group stage) was played between 26 March and 3 May 2000.

=== Group 1 ===
Pos	Team	Pld	W	D	L	GF	GA	GD	Pts	Qualification	KÍ	VB	NSÍ	SÍ
1	KÍ Klaksvík	6	4	0	2	17	8	+9	12	Advanced to quarter-finals		2–3	0–2	5–0
2	VB Vágur	6	4	0	2	14	10	+4	12	Advanced to quarter-finals	1–2		1–3	3–0
3	NSÍ Runavík	6	3	0	3	10	6	+4	9	Advanced to quarter-finals	0–2	0–2		0–1
4	SÍ Sumba	6	1	0	5	5	22	−17	3		2–5	2–4	0–5	

=== Group 2 ===
Pos	Team	Pld	W	D	L	GF	GA	GD	Pts	Qualification	B68	B36	ÍF	B71
1	B68 Toftir	6	5	1	0	18	4	+14	16	Advanced to quarter-finals		3–2	3–1	5–0
2	B36 Tórshavn	6	3	1	2	17	6	+11	10	Advanced to quarter-finals	0–0		6–0	6–0
3	ÍF Fuglafjørður	6	2	0	4	5	17	−12	6		0–4	3–2		1–0
4	B71 Sandoy	6	1	0	5	3	16	−13	3		1–3	0–1	2–0	

=== Group 3 ===
Pos	Team	Pld	W	D	L	GF	GA	GD	Pts	Qualification	GÍ	FSV	HB	TB
1	GÍ Gøta	6	4	1	1	7	4	+3	13	Advanced to quarter-finals		2–3	1–0	awd
2	FS Vágar	6	3	2	1	6	6	0	11	Advanced to quarter-finals	1–1		1–1	awd
3	HB Tórshavn	6	3	1	2	3	6	−3	10	Advanced to quarter-finals	0–3	2–1		awd
4	TB Tvøroyri (Note: TB Tvøroyri withdrew, therefore each team was awarded a 0–0 'win' in each match against them.)	6	0	0	6	0	0	0	0		awd	awd	awd	

== Quarter-finals ==
The matches were played on 21 May 2000.

Team 1	Score	Team 2
B36	2–2 (a.e.t.); 1–4 (p)	HB
B68	1–3	VB
GÍ	3–0	NSÍ
KÍ	2–2 (a.e.t.); 6–7 (p)	FS Vágar

== Semi-finals ==
The first legs were played on 1 June and the second legs on 12 June 2000.

Team 1	Agg.	Team 2	1st leg	2nd leg
GÍ	4–3	FS Vágar	4–3	0–0
HB	8–3	VB	6–2	2–1

== Final ==
2 July 2000

GÍ	1–0	HB
Ó. Hansen 20'

Tórsvøllur, Tórshavn
Referee: Sune Johansen
