= List of football clubs in the Faroe Islands =

This is a list of football clubs in the Faroe Islands.

== Active football clubs in the Faroe Islands ==
There are 16 clubs as of 2025. Each club has a top team, and reserve teams in lower divisions, competing across 4 different levels of the Faroese football pyramid. Many of the teams are commonly referred to by nicknames, given below.

Active Faroe Islands men's football clubs in 2025
Full name	Nickname	Hometown	2025 League (Position)
Argja Bóltfelag	AB	Argir	1. deild (2nd)
B36 Tórshavn	B36	Tórshavn	Premier (5th)
B68 Toftir	B68	Toftir	Premier (6th)
B71 Sandoy	B71	Sandur	1. deild (3rd)
EB/Streymur		Streymnes/Eiði	Premier (7th)
FC Hoyvík (Note: second incarnation; established 2012)		Hoyvík	2. deild (2nd)
FC Suðuroy		Vágur	Premier (9th)
Havnar Bóltfelag	HB	Tórshavn	Premier (2nd)
Ítróttarfelag Fuglafjarðar	ÍF	Fuglafjørður	1. deild (5th)
Klaksvíkar Ítróttarfelag	KÍ	Klaksvík	Premier (1st)
Miðvágs Bóltfelag	MB	Miðvágur	2. deild (11th)
NSÍ Runavík	NSÍ	Runavík	Premier (3rd)
Skála ÍF		Skála	1. deild (1st)
TB Tvøroyri	TB	Tvøroyri	Premier (10th)
07 Vestur		Sørvágur	Premier (8th)
Víkingur Gøta		Norðragøta	Premier (4th)

== Dissolved clubs ==
This is the list of clubs that are either no longer in existence, changed their name or have merged with another club.

There are 16 clubs on this list:

- GÍ Gøta
- LÍF Leirvik
- FC Hoyvík (first incarnation; merged with FF Giza in 2012 to form Giza/Hoyvík, known as ÍF Fram Tórshavn from 1975 to 2008)
- FF Giza (known as NÍF Nólsoy from 1968 to 2010)
- EB Eiði
- Kaldbaks Bóltfelag
- SÍ Sumba
- Skansin Tórshavn
- Bóltfelagið Đriv
- Stranda Bóltfelag
- Streymur Hvalvik
- Æsir Vestmanna
- FS Vágar
- VB Vágur
- VB/Sumba
- Undrið FF

== Other ==
This is the list of clubs that no longer operate in adult football, but participate at youth levels.

- SÍ Sørvágur
- SÍF Sandavágur
- Royn Hvalba

All clubs in the Faroe Islands have second and third teams, that are competing in lower divisions of the Faroese football pyramid.
