= 1986 1. deild =

Coordinates: 62.0167°N 6.7667°W

Faroe Islands Premier League Football
- Season: 1986
- Champions: GÍ
- Relegated: B36
- Matches played: 56
- Goals scored: 190 (3.39 per match)
- Biggest home win: B36 7–2 TB; HB 6–1 TB
- Biggest away win: B68 0–6 GÍ; LÍF 0–6 HB
- Highest scoring: B36 7–2 TB

Statistics of 1. deild in the 1986 season.

== Overview ==
It was contested by 8 teams, and GÍ Gøta won the championship.

== League standings ==
Pos	Team	Pld	W	D	L	GF	GA	GD	Pts
1	GÍ Gøta	14	8	4	2	33	15	+18	20
2	Havnar Bóltfelag	14	8	1	5	32	16	+16	17
3	B68 Toftir	14	7	3	4	26	19	+7	17
4	NSÍ Runavík	14	7	2	5	21	21	0	16
5	TB Tvøroyri	14	6	3	5	20	30	−10	15
6	KÍ Klaksvík	14	4	2	8	15	16	−1	10
7	Leirvík ÍF	14	3	3	8	23	37	−14	9
8	B36 Tórshavn	14	3	2	9	20	36	−16	8

== Results ==
The schedule consisted of a total of 14 games. Each team played two games against every opponent in no particular order. One of the games was at home and one was away.

Home \ Away	B36	B68	GÍG	HB	KÍ	LÍF	NSÍ	TB
B36 Tórshavn		1–4	1–1	1–2	0–1	3–1	0–2	7–2
B68 Toftir	1–1		0–6	0–0	3–1	5–1	2–0	4–1
GÍ Gøta	4–1	1–2		3–2	1–0	1–1	4–0	1–1
HB	4–1	2–0	2–4		0–1	0–3	3–1	6–1
KÍ	1–2	3–0	0–1	0–1		4–0	1–1	1–2
Leirvík ÍF	3–0	2–2	3–5	0–6	1–1		0–2	1–2
NSÍ Runavík	4–1	0–1	1–0	0–4	2–0	5–3		0–0
TB	3–1	1–0	1–1	1–0	2–1	1–4	2–3	

Source: www.faroesoccer.com
Legend: Blue = home team win; Yellow = draw; Red = away team win.

== Top goalscorers ==
Rank	Player	Club	Goals
1	(Denmark) Jesper Wiemer	B68	13
1	(Faroe Islands) Símun Petur Justinussen	GÍ	12 (1)
3	(Faroe Islands) Bjarni Jakobsen	HB	9
3	(Faroe Islands) Gunnar Mohr	HB	9
5	(Faroe Islands) Magnus Gregersen	GÍ	8
6	(Iceland) Egill Steinþórsson	TB	6
6	(England) Martin Nugent	LÍF	6
8	(Faroe Islands) Ingolvur Gunnarson	NSÍ	5
8	(Faroe Islands) Olgar Danielsen	HB	5
