= 1982 1. deild =

Coordinates: 62.0167°N 6.7667°W

Faroe Islands Premier League Football
- Season: 1982
- Champions: HB
- Relegated: ÍF
- Matches played: 56
- Goals scored: 146 (2.61 per match)
- Biggest home win: HB 4–0 GÍ
- Biggest away win: LÍF 0–5 B68
- Highest scoring: TB 5–2 B68

Statistics of 1. deild in the 1982 season.

== Overview ==
It was contested by 8 teams, and Havnar Bóltfelag won the championship.

== League standings ==
Pos	Team	Pld	W	D	L	GF	GA	GD	Pts
1	Havnar Bóltfelag	14	9	4	1	24	9	+15	22
2	TB Tvøroyri	14	7	5	2	29	17	+12	19
3	KÍ Klaksvík	14	8	3	3	19	11	+8	19
4	GÍ Gøta	14	6	2	6	13	17	−4	14
5	B36 Tórshavn	14	4	3	7	14	21	−7	11
6	Leirvík ÍF	14	3	4	7	14	24	−10	10
7	B68 Toftir	14	3	3	8	20	26	−6	9
8	ÍF Fuglafjørður	14	2	4	8	13	21	−8	8

== Results ==
The schedule consisted of a total of 14 games. Each team played two games against every opponent in no particular order. One of the games was at home and one was away.

Home \ Away	B36	B68	GÍG	HB	ÍF	KÍ	LÍF	TB
B36 Tórshavn		3–1	2–0	1–1	0–2	0–2	0–1	1–3
B68 Toftir	0–0		1–2	1–2	1–1	2–0	2–2	2–3
GÍ Gøta	2–0	2–0		0–1	2–1	0–2	2–1	1–1
HB	4–2	3–0	4–0		2–1	1–0	1–0	1–1
ÍF	3–1	1–2	0–1	1–1		0–2	1–3	0–0
KÍ	1–1	2–1	1–1	1–0	1–0		1–1	3–1
Leirvík ÍF	1–2	0–5	1–0	0–2	1–1	0–2		2–2
TB	0–1	5–2	2–0	1–1	4–1	3–1	3–1	

Source: www.faroesoccer.com
Legend: Blue = home team win; Yellow = draw; Red = away team win.
