= 1993 1. deild =

Coordinates: 62.0167°N 6.7667°W

Faroe Islands Premier League Football
- Season: 1993
- Champions: GÍ
- Relegated: VB
- Matches played: 90
- Goals scored: 272 (3.02 per match)
- Biggest home win: HB 7–0 LÍF Leirvík
- Biggest away win: B68 0–3 KÍ; TB 2–5 HB; TB 1–4 LÍF; VB 0–3 TB
- Highest scoring: GÍ 6–3 ÍF; HB 5–4 B68

Statistics of 1. deild in the 1993 season.

== Overview ==
It was contested by 10 teams, and GÍ Gøta won the championship.

== League standings ==
Pos	Team	Pld	W	D	L	GF	GA	GD	Pts
1	GÍ Gøta	18	11	6	1	32	14	+18	28
2	Havnar Bóltfelag	18	9	7	2	41	20	+21	25
3	KÍ Klaksvík	18	9	5	4	24	15	+9	23
4	B71 Sandur	18	10	3	5	30	26	+4	23
5	B36 Tórshavn	18	6	6	6	21	17	+4	18
6	B68 Toftir	18	5	6	7	30	28	+2	16
7	TB Tvøroyri	18	4	6	8	24	30	−6	14
8	ÍF Fuglafjørður	18	5	3	10	27	41	−14	13
9	Leirvík ÍF	18	3	6	9	25	46	−21	12
10	VB Vágur	18	3	2	13	18	35	−17	8

== Results ==
The schedule consisted of a total of 18 games. Each team played two games against every opponent in no particular order. One of the games was at home and one was away.

Home \ Away	B36	B68	B71	GÍG	HB	ÍF	KÍ	LÍF	TB	VBV
B36 Tórshavn		0–0	0–2	0–2	1–1	3–1	0–1	4–1	2–0	2–0
B68 Toftir	0–0		5–1	0–1	1–1	2–0	0–3	5–1	1–1	1–3
B71 Sandoy	1–0	2–0		4–2	2–1	5–1	2–1	2–0	4–3	4–1
GÍ Gøta	2–1	1–1	3–0		0–0	6–3	3–1	2–1	2–0	1–0
HB	1–1	5–4	3–0	1–1		4–1	2–0	7–0	2–1	2–0
ÍF	2–1	1–0	2–2	0–2	1–2		2–1	3–3	3–2	4–1
KÍ	0–0	1–0	1–1	1–0	2–2	2–1		4–0	0–0	1–0
Leirvík ÍF	3–3	3–4	2–1	1–1	1–1	0–0	1–3		0–2	3–2
TB	0–2	2–2	1–0	1–1	2–5	3–0	1–1	1–4		1–1
VB Vágur	0–1	2–4	0–1	2–3	2–1	3–1	0–1	1–1	0–3	

Source: www.faroesoccer.com
Legend: Blue = home team win; Yellow = draw; Red = away team win.

== Top goalscorers ==
Source: faroesoccer.com

11 goals

- (Faroe Islands) Uni Arge (HB)

8 goals

- (Faroe Islands) Torbjørn Jensen (B71)

7 goals

- (Faroe Islands) Súni Fríði Barbá (B68)
- (Faroe Islands) Øssur Hansen (B68)
- (Faroe Islands) Henning Jarnskor (GÍ)

6 goals

- (Faroe Islands) Kári Gullfoss (B36)
- (Faroe Islands) Gunnar Mohr (HB)
- (Faroe Islands) Sámal Joensen (GÍ)
- (Faroe Islands) Pól Thorsteinsson (B36)
