= 1983 1. deild =

Coordinates: 62.0167°N 6.7667°W

Faroe Islands Premier League Football
- Season: 1983
- Champions: GÍ
- Relegated: MB
- Matches played: 56
- Goals scored: 177 (3.16 per match)
- Top goalscorer: Petur Hans Hansen (10)
- Biggest home win: GÍ 5–1 KÍ; TB 5–1 MB
- Biggest away win: MB 0–6 GÍ
- Highest scoring: KÍ 4–4 MB

Following are the results of the 1983 season of the 1. deild, the second tier of football in the Faroe Islands, it was founded in 1942. The league is organised by the Faroe Islands Football Association.

It was contested by 8 teams, and GÍ Gøta won the championship.

== League standings ==
Pos	Team	Pld	W	D	L	GF	GA	GD	Pts
1	GÍ Gøta	14	9	1	4	31	18	+13	19
2	Havnar Bóltfelag	14	8	2	4	23	12	+11	18
3	KÍ Klaksvík	14	7	4	3	29	21	+8	18
4	B68 Toftir	14	5	4	5	19	19	0	14
5	B36 Tórshavn	14	5	3	6	20	26	−6	13
6	Leirvík ÍF	14	4	3	7	16	22	−6	11
7	TB Tvøroyri	14	5	0	9	20	22	−2	10
8	MB Miðvágur	14	3	3	8	19	37	−18	9

== Results ==
The schedule consisted of a total of 14 games. Each team played two games against every opponent in no particular order. One of the games was at home and one was away.

Home \ Away	B36	B68	GÍG	HB	KÍ	LÍF	MBM	TB
B36 Tórshavn		2–1	2–3	1–0	1–3	3–3	0–4	3–1
B68 Toftir	0–0		3–1	0–1	2–2	1–0	1–1	3–1
GÍ Gøta	4–1	1–1		2–1	5–1	0–2	3–1	1–0
HB	2–1	3–1	0–1		2–0	2–0	4–0	2–0
KÍ	1–2	3–1	4–2	0–0		1–1	4–4	2–0
Leirvík ÍF	2–0	3–1	0–1	1–1	1–2		2–1	0–3
MB Miðvágur	0–0	1–3	0–6	3–0	0–5	3–1		0–3
TB	3–1	0–1	2–1	2–5	0–1	3–0	5–1	

Source: www.faroesoccer.com
Legend: Blue = home team win; Yellow = draw; Red = away team win.

== Top goalscorers ==
Rank	Player	Club	Goals
1	(Faroe Islands) Petur Hans Hansen	B68	10
1	(Faroe Islands) Hans Leo í Bartalsstovu	GÍ	10
3	(Faroe Islands) Ásmund Nolsøe	TB	9
4	(Iceland) Lárus Gretarsson	GÍ	8
5	(Faroe Islands) Beinir Poulsen	KÍ	7
6	(Faroe Islands) Oddbjørn Joensen	KÍ	6
6	(Faroe Islands) Símun Petur Justinussen	GÍ	5 (1)
