= 1996 1. deild =

Coordinates: 62.0167°N 6.7667°W

Faroe Islands Premier League Football
- Season: 1996
- Champions: GÍ
- Relegated: EB/Streymur
- Matches played: 90
- Goals scored: 309 (3.43 per match)
- Biggest home win: GÍ 7–0 FS Vágar
- Biggest away win: B71 1–9 GÍ
- Highest scoring: TB 2–9 HB

Statistics of 1. deild in the 1996 season.

== Overview ==
It was contested by 10 teams, and GÍ Gøta won the championship.

== League standings ==
| Pos | Team | Pld | W | D | L | GF | GA | GD | Pts |
|---|---|---|---|---|---|---|---|---|---|
| 1 | GÍ Gøta | 18 | 12 | 3 | 3 | 52 | 14 | +38 | 39 |
| 2 | KÍ Klaksvík | 18 | 11 | 6 | 1 | 47 | 16 | +31 | 39 |
| 3 | HB Tórshavn | 18 | 10 | 2 | 6 | 47 | 29 | +18 | 32 |
| 4 | B36 Tórshavn | 18 | 9 | 5 | 4 | 34 | 21 | +13 | 32 |
| 5 | VB Vágur | 18 | 7 | 3 | 8 | 19 | 25 | −6 | 24 |
| 6 | ÍF Fuglafjørður | 18 | 6 | 5 | 7 | 26 | 32 | −6 | 23 |
| 7 | B68 Toftir | 18 | 5 | 3 | 10 | 23 | 34 | −11 | 18 |
| 8 | B71 Sandur | 18 | 4 | 6 | 8 | 20 | 40 | −20 | 18 |
| 9 | FS Vágar | 18 | 4 | 1 | 13 | 20 | 47 | −27 | 13 |
| 10 | TB Tvøroyri | 18 | 3 | 4 | 11 | 21 | 51 | −30 | 13 |

== Results ==
The schedule consisted of a total of 18 games. Each team played two games against every opponent in no particular order. One of the games was at home and one was away.

| Home \ Away | B36 | B68 | B71 | FSV | GÍG | HB | ÍF | KÍ | TB | VBV |
|---|---|---|---|---|---|---|---|---|---|---|
| B36 Tórshavn | | 4–3 | 2–2 | 5–1 | 0–0 | 2–0 | 4–0 | 1–1 | 3–1 | 2–1 |
| B68 Toftir | 1–0 | | 1–3 | 2–1 | 0–3 | 3–4 | 1–1 | 0–4 | 1–2 | 3–1 |
| B71 Sandoy | 1–0 | 4–2 | | 2–1 | 1–9 | 0–2 | 1–3 | 0–6 | 0–0 | 1–1 |
| FS Vágar | 1–2 | 0–1 | 1–1 | | 1–3 | 1–0 | 2–1 | 1–3 | 5–1 | 2–0 |
| GÍ Gøta | 3–0 | 2–1 | 1–1 | 7–0 | | 5–1 | 4–1 | 1–2 | 3–1 | 1–0 |
| HB | 3–1 | 0–0 | 4–2 | 4–2 | 3–2 | | 5–0 | 3–3 | 7–1 | 1–2 |
| ÍF | 1–1 | 2–1 | 1–0 | 6–0 | 1–1 | 2–0 | | 1–2 | 2–2 | 0–0 |
| KÍ | 1–1 | 1–1 | 4–0 | 4–0 | 1–0 | 0–1 | 5–1 | | 5–2 | 2–2 |
| TB | 0–3 | 0–2 | 1–1 | 3–1 | 0–3 | 2–9 | 1–2 | 1–1 | | 3–2 |
| VB Vágur | 1–3 | 2–0 | 1–0 | 2–0 | 0–4 | 1–0 | 2–1 | 0–2 | 1–0 | |

Source: www.faroesoccer.com
Legend: Blue = home team win; Yellow = draw; Red = away team win.

== Top goalscorers ==
Source: faroesoccer.com

== Top goalscorers ==
| Rank | Player | Club | Goals |
|---|---|---|---|
| 1 | (Faroe Islands) Kurt Mørkøre | KÍ | 19 (1) |
| 2 | (Faroe Islands) Uni Arge | HB | 16 |
| 3 | (Faroe Islands) John Petersen | GÍ | 15 |
| 4 | (Faroe Islands) Símun Petur Justinussen | GÍ | 9 (1) |
| 5 | (Faroe Islands) Gunnar Nielsen | B36 | 9 |
| 5 | (Serbia and Montenegro) Velibor Kopunović | VB | 9 |
| 7 | (Faroe Islands) Eli Hentze | B71 | 6 (1) |
| 7 | (Faroe Islands) Henning Jarnskor | GÍ | 7 |
| 7 | (Faroe Islands) Rúni Nolsøe | HB | 7 |
