= Croatian football clubs in European competitions =

Croatian football clubs have participated in UEFA competitions since 1958. Before 1992, Croatia was a part of Yugoslavia. Therefore, Croatian teams represented this country and did not always have a guaranteed spot in European competitions. Dinamo Zagreb is the only Croatian club that won a European trophy by winning the Inter-Cities Fairs Cup 1966–67 season.

All statistics and records are accurate as of 28 August 2025.

== Statistics ==
As of 28 August 2025.

- Most European Cup / Champions League competitions appeared in: 26 – Dinamo Zagreb
- Most UEFA Cup / Europa League competitions appeared in: 28 – Hajduk Split
- Most Cup Winners' Cup competitions appeared in: 9 – Dinamo Zagreb
- Most Intertoto Cup competitions appeared in: 5 – Slaven Belupo
- Most Europa Conference League competitions appeared in: 5 – Hajduk Split, Rijeka
- Most competitions appeared in overall: 64 – Dinamo Zagreb
- First match played: Dinamo Zagreb 2–2 Dukla Prague (1958–59 European Cup PR)
- Most matches played: 349 – Dinamo Zagreb
- Most match wins: 144 – Dinamo Zagreb
- Most match draws: 72 – Dinamo Zagreb
- Most match losses: 133 – Dinamo Zagreb
- Biggest win (match): 8 goals
  - GÍ Gøta 0–8 Hajduk Split (2002–03 UEFA Cup QR)
- Biggest win (aggregate): 11 goals
  - Dinamo Zagreb 11–0 B68 Toftir (1993–94 UEFA Champions League PR)
  - Hajduk Split 11–0 GÍ Gøta (2002–03 UEFA Cup QR)
- Biggest defeat (match): 7 goals
  - Bayern Munich 9–2 Dinamo Zagreb (2024–25 UEFA Champions League league phase)
- Biggest defeat (aggregate): 8 goals
  - Hajduk Split 0–8 Debreceni (2005–06 UEFA Champions League QR2)

== European champions ==
| European Cup/ Champions League | UEFA Cup/Europa League | Inter-Cities Fairs Cup | Intertoto Cup | Cup Winners' Cup | Super Cup |
|---|---|---|---|---|---|
| None | None | 1966–67 – Dinamo Zagreb | None | None | None |

=== UEFA country coefficient and ranking ===
The associations were allocated places for the 2025–26 UEFA competitions according to their 2024 UEFA country coefficients, which consider their performance in European competitions from 2019–20 to 2023–24. In the 2024 rankings used for the 2025–26 European competitions, Croatia's coefficient points total is 25.525. Croatia is ranked by UEFA as the 20th association in Europe out of 55.

- 18 Ukraine 28.000
- 19 Serbia 27.775
- 20 Croatia 25.525
- 21 Poland 25.375
- 22 Russia 22.965
  - Full list

=== UEFA country coefficient history ===
(As of 28 August 2025), Source: Bert Kassies website.

| Accumulated | Valid | Rank | Movement | Coefficient | Change |
|---|---|---|---|---|---|
| 1989–90 to 1993–94 | 1995–96 | 31 | | 4.000 | |
| 1990–91 to 1994–95 | 1996–97 | 22 | ▲ +9 | 11.500 | ▲ +7.500 |
| 1991–92 to 1995–96 | 1997–98 | 25 | ▼ -3 | 12.500 | ▲ +1.000 |
| 1992–93 to 1996–97 | 1998–99 | 21 | ▲ +4 | 18.500 | ▲ +6.000 |
| 1993–94 to 1997–98 | 1999–00 | 13 | ▲ +8 | 26.166 | ▲ +7.666 |
| 1994–95 to 1998–99 | 2000–01 | 13 | Steady | 20.374 | ▼ -5.792 |
| 1995–96 to 1999–00 | 2001–02 | 21 | ▼ -8 | 16.124 | ▼ -4.250 |
| 1996–97 to 2000–01 | 2002–03 | 18 | ▲ +3 | 19.999 | ▲ +3.875 |
| 1997–98 to 2001–02 | 2003–04 | 19 | ▼ -1 | 21.041 | ▲ +1.042 |
| 1998–99 to 2002–03 | 2004–05 | 22 | ▼ -3 | 18.625 | ▼ -2.416 |
| 1999–00 to 2003–04 | 2005–06 | 23 | ▼ -1 | 17.375 | ▼ -1.250 |
| 2000–01 to 2004–05 | 2006–07 | 22 | ▲ +1 | 18.125 | ▲ +0.750 |
| 2001–02 to 2005–06 | 2007–08 | 25 | ▼ -3 | 14.083 | ▼ -4.042 |
| 2002–03 to 2006–07 | 2008–09 | 26 | ▼ -1 | 10.708 | ▼ -3.375 |
| 2003–04 to 2007–08 | 2009–10 | 27 | ▼ -1 | 11.624 | ▲ +0.916 |
| 2004–05 to 2008–09 | 2010–11 | 27 | Steady | 12.332 | ▲ +0.708 |
| 2005–06 to 2009–10 | 2011–12 | 27 | Steady | 12.332 | Steady |
| 2006–07 to 2010–11 | 2012–13 | 22 | ▲ +5 | 16.124 | ▲ +3.792 |
| 2007–08 to 2011–12 | 2013–14 | 21 | ▲ +1 | 18.874 | ▲ +2.750 |
| 2008–09 to 2012–13 | 2014–15 | 22 | ▼ -1 | 19.583 | ▲ +0.709 |
| 2009–10 to 2013–14 | 2015–16 | 20 | ▲ +2 | 19.625 | ▲ +0.042 |
| 2010–11 to 2014–15 | 2016–17 | 17 | ▲ +3 | 23.500 | ▲ +3.875 |
| 2011–12 to 2015–16 | 2017–18 | 17 | Steady | 23.875 | ▲ +0.375 |
| 2012–13 to 2016–17 | 2018–19 | 16 | ▲ +1 | 25.250 | ▲ +1.375 |
| 2013–14 to 2017–18 | 2019–20 | 16 | Steady | 26.000 | ▲ +0.750 |
| 2014–15 to 2018–19 | 2020–21 | 15 | ▲ +1 | 27.375 | ▲ +1.375 |
| 2015–16 to 2019–20 | 2021–22 | 20 | ▼ -5 | 24.875 | ▼ -2.500 |
| 2016–17 to 2020–21 | 2022–23 | 18 | ▲ +2 | 26.275 | ▲ +1.400 |
| 2017–18 to 2021–22 | 2023–24 | 19 | ▼ -1 | 27.150 | ▲ +0.875 |
| 2018–19 to 2022–23 | 2024–25 | 19 | Steady | 25.400 | ▼ -1.750 |
| 2019–20 to 2023–24 | 2025–26 | 20 | ▼ -1 | 25.525 | ▲ +0.125 |
| 2020–21 to 2024–25 | 2026–27 | 21 | ▼ -1 | 27.025 | ▲ +1.500 |
| 2021–22 to 2025–26 | 2027–28 | 22 | | 22.625 | |
| 2022–23 to 2026–27 | 2028–29 | 26 | | 16.625 | |
| 2023–24 to 2027–28 | 2029–30 | 24 | | 13.250 | |
| 2024–25 to 2028–29 | 2030–31 | 24 | | 7.375 | |
| 2025–26 to 2029–30 | 2031–32 | 45 | | 1.500 | |

== Appearances in UEFA competitions ==
As of 28 August 2025

| Club | UEFA Champions League (includes European Cup) | | | | | UEFA Europa League (includes UEFA Cup) | | | | | UEFA Europa Conference League | | | | | UEFA Cup Winners' Cup | | | | | UEFA Intertoto Cup | | | | | Total | | | | | First Appearance | Last Appearance |
| Club | Apps. | Pld | W | D | L | Apps. | Pld | W | D | L | Apps. | Pld | W | D | L | Apps. | Pld | W | D | L | Apps. | Pld | W | D | L | Apps. | Pld | W | D | L | First Appearance | Last Appearance |
|---|---|---|---|---|---|---|---|---|---|---|---|---|---|---|---|---|---|---|---|---|---|---|---|---|---|---|---|---|---|---|---|---|
| Dinamo Zagreb | 26 | 170 | 72 | 35 | 63 | 28 | 139 | 56 | 31 | 52 | 1 | 10 | 5 | 1 | 4 | 9 | 30 | 11 | 5 | 14 | 0 | 0 | 0 | 0 | 0 | 64 | 349 | 144 | 72 | 133 | 1958–59 EC | 2025–26 UEL |
| Hajduk Split | 10 | 40 | 18 | 10 | 12 | 28 | 132 | 59 | 26 | 47 | 5 | 16 | 5 | 4 | 7 | 8 | 30 | 10 | 3 | 17 | 0 | 0 | 0 | 0 | 0 | 51 | 218 | 92 | 43 | 83 | 1967–68 CWC | 2025–26 CO |
| Rijeka | 3 | 10 | 2 | 3 | 5 | 17 | 76 | 29 | 19 | 28 | 5 | 16 | 7 | 4 | 5 | 2 | 10 | 3 | 3 | 4 | 2 | 4 | 1 | 1 | 2 | 29 | 116 | 42 | 30 | 44 | 1978–79 CWC | 2025–26 CO |
| Osijek | 0 | 0 | 0 | 0 | 0 | 11 | 37 | 18 | 3 | 16 | 4 | 14 | 7 | 4 | 3 | 0 | 0 | 0 | 0 | 0 | 1 | 2 | 0 | 2 | 0 | 16 | 53 | 25 | 9 | 19 | 1995–96 UC | 2024–25 CO |
| Slaven Belupo | 0 | 0 | 0 | 0 | 0 | 4 | 20 | 10 | 2 | 8 | 0 | 0 | 0 | 0 | 0 | 0 | 0 | 0 | 0 | 0 | 5 | 34 | 17 | 7 | 10 | 9 | 54 | 27 | 9 | 18 | 2000 UIC | 2012–13 UEL |
| Varaždin^{[₳]} | 0 | 0 | 0 | 0 | 0 | 5 | 22 | 10 | 5 | 7 | 0 | 0 | 0 | 0 | 0 | 2 | 10 | 6 | 1 | 3 | 2 | 12 | 5 | 3 | 4 | 9 | 44 | 21 | 9 | 14 | 1996–97 CWC | 2011–12 UEL |
| NK Zagreb | 1 | 2 | 1 | 0 | 1 | 0 | 0 | 0 | 0 | 0 | 0 | 0 | 0 | 0 | 0 | 1 | 4 | 3 | 0 | 1 | 4 | 10 | 2 | 4 | 4 | 6 | 16 | 6 | 4 | 6 | 1995 UIC | 2007 UIC |
| Lokomotiva | 1 | 1 | 0 | 0 | 1 | 4 | 15 | 7 | 4 | 4 | 0 | 0 | 0 | 0 | 0 | 0 | 0 | 0 | 0 | 0 | 0 | 0 | 0 | 0 | 0 | 5 | 16 | 7 | 4 | 5 | 2013–14 UEL | 2020–21 UEL |
| Cibalia | 0 | 0 | 0 | 0 | 0 | 1 | 2 | 0 | 1 | 1 | 0 | 0 | 0 | 0 | 0 | 0 | 0 | 0 | 0 | 0 | 2 | 10 | 3 | 3 | 4 | 3 | 12 | 3 | 4 | 5 | 2000 UIC | 2010–11 UEL |
| Hrvatski Dragovoljac | 0 | 0 | 0 | 0 | 0 | 0 | 0 | 0 | 0 | 0 | 0 | 0 | 0 | 0 | 0 | 0 | 0 | 0 | 0 | 0 | 3 | 8 | 4 | 0 | 4 | 3 | 8 | 4 | 0 | 4 | 1997 UIC | 1998 UIC |
| RNK Split | 0 | 0 | 0 | 0 | 0 | 2 | 12 | 5 | 5 | 2 | 0 | 0 | 0 | 0 | 0 | 0 | 0 | 0 | 0 | 0 | 0 | 0 | 0 | 0 | 0 | 2 | 12 | 5 | 5 | 2 | 2011–12 UEL | 2014–15 UEL |
| Kamen Ingrad | 0 | 0 | 0 | 0 | 0 | 1 | 4 | 2 | 1 | 1 | 0 | 0 | 0 | 0 | 0 | 0 | 0 | 0 | 0 | 0 | 1 | 2 | 0 | 0 | 2 | 2 | 6 | 2 | 1 | 3 | 2003–04 UC | 2004 UIC |
| Segesta | 0 | 0 | 0 | 0 | 0 | 0 | 0 | 0 | 0 | 0 | 0 | 0 | 0 | 0 | 0 | 0 | 0 | 0 | 0 | 0 | 1 | 8 | 5 | 1 | 2 | 1 | 8 | 5 | 1 | 2 | 1996 UIC | 1996 UIC |
| Šibenik | 0 | 0 | 0 | 0 | 0 | 1 | 4 | 2 | 1 | 1 | 0 | 0 | 0 | 0 | 0 | 0 | 0 | 0 | 0 | 0 | 0 | 0 | 0 | 0 | 0 | 1 | 4 | 2 | 1 | 1 | 2010–11 UEL | 2010–11 UEL |
| Inter Zaprešić | 0 | 0 | 0 | 0 | 0 | 1 | 2 | 0 | 0 | 2 | 0 | 0 | 0 | 0 | 0 | 0 | 0 | 0 | 0 | 0 | 0 | 0 | 0 | 0 | 0 | 1 | 2 | 0 | 0 | 2 | 2005–06 UC | 2005–06 UC |
| Varaždin | 0 | 0 | 0 | 0 | 0 | 0 | 0 | 0 | 0 | 0 | 1 | 2 | 1 | 0 | 1 | 0 | 0 | 0 | 0 | 0 | 0 | 0 | 0 | 0 | 0 | 1 | 2 | 1 | 0 | 1 | 2025–26 CO | 2025–26 CO |
| Total (16) | 41 | 223 | 93 | 48 | 82 | 103 | 465 | 198 | 98 | 169 | 16 | 58 | 25 | 13 | 20 | 22 | 84 | 33 | 12 | 39 | 21 | 90 | 37 | 21 | 32 | 203 | 920 | 386 | 192 | 342 | | |

Apps. = Appearances; Pld = Matches played; W = Matches won; D = Matches drawn; L = Matches lost; EC = European Cup; UCL = UEFA Champions League; UC = UEFA Cup; UEL = UEFA Europa League; CWC = UEFA Cup Winners' Cup; UIC = UEFA Intertoto Cup.

=== Notes ===
₳: This NK Varaždin (1931–2015), which was named NK Varteks during most of its UEFA matches, no longer exists. An unassociated NK Varteks (2011), and an unassociated NK Varaždin (2012) now exist, with latter making their debut in QR2 of 2025-26 UEFA Conference League.

== Competitions ==
=== Active ===
Current format: QR1/QR2/QR3 = First/Second/Third qualifying round; PO = Playoff; LP = League phase; KPO = Knockout round play-offs; R16 = Round of 16; QF = Quarter-finals; SF = Semi-finals; F = Final.

Former formats: PR = Preliminary round; QR = Qualifying round; R1/R2 = First/Second round; GS = Group stage; R32 = Round of 32.

==== European Cup / UEFA Champions League ====
| Season | Club | Round | Opponent | Home | Away | Agg. |
|---|---|---|---|---|---|---|
European Cup
| 1958–59 | Dinamo | PR | (Czechoslovakia) Dukla Prague | 2–2 | 1–2 | 3–4 |
| 1971–72 | Hajduk | R1 | (Spain) Valencia | 1–1 | 0–0 | 1–1 (a) |
| 1974–75 | Hajduk | R1 | (Iceland) Keflavík | 7–1 | 2–0 | 9–1 |
| 1974–75 | Hajduk | R2 | (France) Saint-Étienne | 4–1 | 1–5 | 5–6 |
| 1975–76 | Hajduk | R1 | (Malta) Floriana | 3–0 | 5–0 | 8–0 |
| 1975–76 | Hajduk | R2 | (Belgium) Molenbeek | 4–0 | 3–2 | 7–2 |
| 1975–76 | Hajduk | QF | (Netherlands) PSV Eindhoven | 2–0 | 0–3 (a.e.t.) | 2–3 |
| 1979–80 | Hajduk | R1 | (Turkey) Trabzonspor | 1–0 | 1–0 | 2–0 |
| 1979–80 | Hajduk | R2 | (Denmark) Vejle | 1–2 | 3–0 | 4–2 |
| 1979–80 | Hajduk | QF | (West Germany) Hamburger SV | 3–2 | 0–1 | 3–3 (a) |
| 1982–83 | Dinamo | R1 | (Portugal) Sporting CP | 1–0 | 0–3 | 1–3 |
UEFA Champions League
| 1992–93 | None | | | | | |
| 1993–94 | Croatia | PR | (Faroe Islands) B68 Toftir | 6–0 | 5–0 | 11–0 |
| 1993–94 | Croatia | R1 | (Romania) Steaua București | 2–3 | 2–1 | 4–4 (a) |
| 1994–95 | Hajduk | QR | (Poland) Legia Warsaw | 4–0 | 1–0 | 5–0 |
| 1994–95 | Hajduk | GS | (Portugal) Benfica | 0–0 | 1–2 | 2nd out of 4 |
| 1994–95 | Hajduk | GS | (Romania) Steaua București | 1–4 | 1–0 | 2nd out of 4 |
| 1994–95 | Hajduk | GS | (Belgium) Anderlecht | 2–1 | 0–0 | 2nd out of 4 |
| 1994–95 | Hajduk | QF | (Netherlands) Ajax | 0–0 | 0–3 | 0–3 |
| 1995–96 | Hajduk | QR | (Greece) Panathinaikos | 1–1 | 0–0 | 1–1 (a) |
| 1996–97 | None | | | | | |
| 1997–98 | Croatia | QR1 | (Federal Republic of Yugoslavia) Partizan | 5–0 | 0–1 | 5–1 |
| 1997–98 | Croatia | QR2 | (England) Newcastle United | 2–2 (a.e.t.) | 1–2 | 3–4 |
| 1998–99 | Croatia | QR2 | (Scotland) Celtic | 3–0 | 0–1 | 3–1 |
| 1998–99 | Croatia | GS | (Netherlands) Ajax | 0–0 | 1–0 | 2nd out of 4 |
| 1998–99 | Croatia | GS | (Greece) Olympiacos | 1–1 | 0–2 | 2nd out of 4 |
| 1998–99 | Croatia | GS | (Portugal) Porto | 3–1 | 0–3 | 2nd out of 4 |
| 1999–00 | Croatia | QR3 | (Hungary) MTK Budapest | 0–0 | 2–0 | 2–0 |
| 1999–00 | Croatia | GS | (England) Manchester United | 1–2 | 0–0 | 4th out of 4 |
| 1999–00 | Croatia | GS | (France) Marseille | 1–2 | 2–2 | 4th out of 4 |
| 1999–00 | Croatia | GS | (Austria) Sturm Graz | 3–0 | 0–1 | 4th out of 4 |
| 1999–00 | Rijeka | QR2 | (Federal Republic of Yugoslavia) Partizan | 0–3 | 1–3 | 1–6 |
| 2000–01 | Dinamo | QR3 | (Italy) Milan | 0–3 | 1–3 | 1–6 |
| 2000–01 | Hajduk | QR2 | (Hungary) Dunaferr | 0–2 | 2–2 | 2–4 |
| 2001–02 | Hajduk | QR2 | (Hungary) Ferencváros | 0–0 | 0–0 | 0–0 (6–5 p) |
| 2001–02 | Hajduk | QR3 | (Spain) Mallorca | 1–0 | 0–2 (a.e.t.) | 1–2 |
| 2002–03 | Zagreb | QR2 | (Hungary) Zalaegerszeg | 2–1 | 0–1 | 2–2 (a) |
| 2003–04 | Dinamo | QR2 | (Slovenia) Maribor | 2–1 | 1–1 | 3–2 |
| 2003–04 | Dinamo | QR3 | (Ukraine) Dynamo Kyiv | 0–2 | 1–3 | 1–5 |
| 2004–05 | Hajduk | QR2 | (Republic of Ireland) Shelbourne | 3–2 | 0–2 | 3–4 |
| 2005–06 | Hajduk | QR2 | (Hungary) Debrecen | 0–5 | 0–3 | 0–8 |
| 2006–07 | Dinamo | QR2 | (Lithuania) Ekranas | 5–2 | 4–1 | 9–3 |
| 2006–07 | Dinamo | QR3 | (England) Arsenal | 0–3 | 1–2 | 1–5 |
| 2007–08 | Dinamo | QR1 | (Azerbaijan) Khazar Lankaran | 3–1 | 1–1 | 4–2 |
| 2007–08 | Dinamo | QR2 | (Slovenia) Domžale | 3–1 | 2–1 | 5–2 |
| 2007–08 | Dinamo | QR3 | (Germany) Werder Bremen | 1–2 | 2–3 | 3–5 |
| 2008–09 | Dinamo | QR1 | (Northern Ireland) Linfield | 1–1 | 2–0 | 3–1 |
| 2008–09 | Dinamo | QR2 | (Slovenia) Domžale | 3–2 | 3–0 | 6–2 |
| 2008–09 | Dinamo | QR3 | (Ukraine) Shakhtar Donetsk | 1–3 | 0–2 | 1–5 |
| 2009–10 | Dinamo | QR2 | (Armenia) Pyunik | 3–0 | 0–0 | 3–0 |
| 2009–10 | Dinamo | QR3 | (Austria) Red Bull Salzburg | 1–2 | 1–1 | 2–3 |
| 2010–11 | Dinamo | QR2 | (Slovenia) Koper | 5–1 | 0–3 | 5–4 |
| 2010–11 | Dinamo | QR3 | (Moldova) Sheriff Tiraspol | 1–1 | 1–1 | 2–2 (5–6 p) |
| 2011–12 | Dinamo | QR2 | (Azerbaijan) Neftchi Baku | 3–0 | 0–0 | 3–0 |
| 2011–12 | Dinamo | QR3 | (Finland) HJK | 1–0 | 2–1 | 3–1 |
| 2011–12 | Dinamo | PO | (Sweden) Malmö FF | 4–1 | 0–2 | 4–3 |
| 2011–12 | Dinamo | GS | (Netherlands) Ajax | 0–2 | 0–4 | 4th out of 4 |
| 2011–12 | Dinamo | GS | (France) Lyon | 1–7 | 0–2 | 4th out of 4 |
| 2011–12 | Dinamo | GS | (Spain) Real Madrid | 0–1 | 2–6 | 4th out of 4 |
| 2012–13 | Dinamo | QR2 | (Bulgaria) Ludogorets Razgrad | 3–2 | 1–1 | 4–3 |
| 2012–13 | Dinamo | QR3 | (Moldova) Sheriff Tiraspol | 4–0 | 1–0 | 5–0 |
| 2012–13 | Dinamo | PO | (Slovenia) Maribor | 2–1 | 1–0 | 3–1 |
| 2012–13 | Dinamo | GS | (Ukraine) Dynamo Kyiv | 1–1 | 0–2 | 4th out of 4 |
| 2012–13 | Dinamo | GS | (France) Paris Saint-Germain | 0–2 | 0–4 | 4th out of 4 |
| 2012–13 | Dinamo | GS | (Portugal) Porto | 0–2 | 0–3 | 4th out of 4 |
| 2013–14 | Dinamo | QR2 | (Luxembourg) Fola Esch | 1–0 | 5–0 | 6–0 |
| 2013–14 | Dinamo | QR3 | (Moldova) Sheriff Tiraspol | 1–0 | 3–0 | 4–0 |
| 2013–14 | Dinamo | PO | Austria Wien | 0–2 | 3–2 | 3–4 |
| 2014–15 | Dinamo | QR2 | (Lithuania) Žalgiris | 2–0 | 2–0 | 4–0 |
| 2014–15 | Dinamo | QR3 | (Denmark) AaB | 0–2 | 1–0 | 1–2 |
| 2015–16 | Dinamo | QR2 | (Luxembourg) Fola Esch | 1–1 | 3–0 | 4–1 |
| 2015–16 | Dinamo | QR3 | (Norway) Molde | 1–1 | 3–3 | 4–4 (a) |
| 2015–16 | Dinamo | PO | (Albania) Skënderbeu | 4–1 | 2–1 | 6–2 |
| 2015–16 | Dinamo | GS | (England) Arsenal | 2–1 | 0–3 | 4th out of 4 |
| 2015–16 | Dinamo | GS | (Germany) Bayern Munich | 0–2 | 0–5 | 4th out of 4 |
| 2015–16 | Dinamo | GS | (Greece) Olympiacos | 0–1 | 1–2 | 4th out of 4 |
| 2016–17 | Dinamo | QR2 | (North Macedonia) Vardar | 3–2 | 2–1 | 5–3 |
| 2016–17 | Dinamo | QR3 | (Georgia (country)) Dinamo Tbilisi | 2–0 | 1–0 | 3–0 |
| 2016–17 | Dinamo | PO | (Austria) Red Bull Salzburg | 1–1 | 2–1 (a.e.t.) | 3–2 |
| 2016–17 | Dinamo | GS | (France) Lyon | 0–1 | 0–3 | 4th out of 4 |
| 2016–17 | Dinamo | GS | (Italy) Juventus | 0–4 | 0–2 | 4th out of 4 |
| 2016–17 | Dinamo | GS | (Spain) Sevilla | 0–1 | 0–4 | 4th out of 4 |
| 2017–18 | Rijeka | QR2 | (Wales) The New Saints | 2–0 | 5–1 | 7–1 |
| 2017–18 | Rijeka | QR3 | (Austria) Red Bull Salzburg | 0–0 | 1–1 | 1–1 (a) |
| 2017–18 | Rijeka | PO | (Greece) Olympiacos | 0–1 | 1–2 | 1–3 |
| 2018–19 | Dinamo | QR2 | (Israel) Hapoel Be'er Sheva | 5–0 | 2–2 | 7–2 |
| 2018–19 | Dinamo | QR3 | (Kazakhstan) Astana | 1–0 | 2–0 | 3–0 |
| 2018–19 | Dinamo | PO | (Switzerland) Young Boys | 1–2 | 1–1 | 2–3 |
| 2019–20 | Dinamo | QR2 | (Georgia (country)) Saburtalo Tbilisi | 3–0 | 2–0 | 5–0 |
| 2019–20 | Dinamo | QR3 | (Hungary) Ferencváros | 1–1 | 4–0 | 5–1 |
| 2019–20 | Dinamo | PO | (Norway) Rosenborg | 2–0 | 1–1 | 3–1 |
| 2019–20 | Dinamo | GS | (Italy) Atalanta | 4–0 | 0–2 | 4th out of 4 |
| 2019–20 | Dinamo | GS | (England) Manchester City | 1–4 | 0–2 | 4th out of 4 |
| 2019–20 | Dinamo | GS | (Ukraine) Shakhtar Donetsk | 3–3 | 2–2 | 4th out of 4 |
| 2020–21 | Dinamo | QR2 | (Romania) CFR Cluj | | 2–2 (6–5 p) | |
| 2020–21 | Dinamo | QR3 | (Hungary) Ferencváros | | 1–2 | |
| 2020–21 | Lokomotiva | QR2 | (Austria) Rapid Wien | 0–1 | | |
| 2021–22 | Dinamo | QR1 | (Iceland) Valur | 3–2 | 2–0 | 5–2 |
| 2021–22 | Dinamo | QR2 | (Cyprus) Omonia | 2–0 | 1–0 | 3–0 |
| 2021–22 | Dinamo | QR3 | (Poland) Legia Warsaw | 1–1 | 1–0 | 2–1 |
| 2021–22 | Dinamo | PO | (Moldova) Sheriff Tiraspol | 0–0 | 0–3 | 0–3 |
| 2022–23 | Dinamo | QR2 | (North Macedonia) Shkupi | 2–2 | 1–0 | 3–2 |
| 2022–23 | Dinamo | QR3 | (Bulgaria) Ludogorets Razgrad | 4–2 | 2–1 | 6–3 |
| 2022–23 | Dinamo | PO | (Norway) Bodø/Glimt | 4–1 (a.e.t.) | 0–1 | 4–2 |
| 2022–23 | Dinamo | GS | (Italy) Milan | 0–4 | 1–3 | 4th out of 4 |
| 2022–23 | Dinamo | GS | (England) Chelsea | 1–0 | 1–2 | 4th out of 4 |
| 2022–23 | Dinamo | GS | (Austria) Red Bull Salzburg | 1–1 | 0–1 | 4th out of 4 |
| 2023–24 | Dinamo | QR2 | (Kazakhstan) Astana | 4–0 | 2–0 | 6–0 |
| 2023–24 | Dinamo | QR3 | (Greece) AEK Athens | 1–2 | 2–2 | 3–4 |
| 2024–25 | Dinamo | PO | (Azerbaijan) Qarabağ | 3–0 | 2–0 | 5–0 |
| 2024–25 | Dinamo | LP | (Germany) Bayern Munich | | 2–9 | 25th out of 36 |
| 2024–25 | Dinamo | LP | (France) Monaco | 2–2 | | 25th out of 36 |
| 2024–25 | Dinamo | LP | (Austria) Red Bull Salzburg | | 2–0 | 25th out of 36 |
| 2024–25 | Dinamo | LP | (Slovakia) Slovan Bratislava | | 4–1 | 25th out of 36 |
| 2024–25 | Dinamo | LP | (Germany) Borussia Dortmund | 0–3 | | 25th out of 36 |
| 2024–25 | Dinamo | LP | (Scotland) Celtic | 0–0 | | 25th out of 36 |
| 2024–25 | Dinamo | LP | (England) Arsenal | | 0–3 | 25th out of 36 |
| 2024–25 | Dinamo | LP | (Italy) Milan | 2–1 | | 25th out of 36 |
| 2025–26 | Rijeka | QR2 | (Bulgaria) Ludogorets Razgrad | 0–0 | 1–3 (a.e.t.) | 1–3 |
| 2026–27 | Dinamo | QR2 | (Switzerland) Thun | 3–2 (a.e.t.) | 1–1 | 4–3 |
| 2026–27 | Dinamo | QR3 | (Lithuania) Kauno Žalgiris | 5–0 | 2–1 | 7–1 |
| 2026–27 | Dinamo | PO | (Norway) Viking | 2–2 | 1–3 | 3–5 |

==== UEFA Cup / UEFA Europa League ====
| Season | Club | Round | Opponent | Home | Away | Agg. |
|---|---|---|---|---|---|---|
UEFA Cup
| 1971–72 | Dinamo | R1 | (Bulgaria) Botev Vratsa | 6–1 | 2–1 | 8–2 |
| 1971–72 | Dinamo | R2 | (Austria) Rapid Wien | 2–2 | 0–0 | 2–2 (a) |
| 1976–77 | Dinamo | R1 | (Romania) ASA Târgu Mureş | 3–0 | 1–0 | 4–0 |
| 1976–77 | Dinamo | R2 | (East Germany) 1. FC Magdeburg | 2–2 | 0–2 | 2–4 |
| 1977–78 | Dinamo | R1 | (Greece) Olympiacos | 5–1 | 1–3 | 6–4 |
| 1977–78 | Dinamo | R2 | (Italy) Torino | 1–0 | 1–3 | 2–3 |
| 1978–79 | Hajduk | R1 | (Austria) Rapid Wien | 2–0 | 1–2 | 3–2 |
| 1978–79 | Hajduk | R2 | (England) Arsenal | 2–1 | 0–1 | 2–2 (a) |
| 1979–80 | Dinamo | R1 | (Italy) Perugia | 0–0 | 0–1 | 0–1 |
| 1981–82 | Hajduk | R1 | (West Germany) VfB Stuttgart | 3–1 | 2–2 | 5–3 |
| 1981–82 | Hajduk | R2 | (Belgium) Beveren | 1–2 | 3–2 | 4–4 (a) |
| 1981–82 | Hajduk | R3 | (Spain) Valencia | 4–1 | 1–5 | 5–6 |
| 1982–83 | Hajduk | R1 | (Malta) Zurrieq | 4–0 | 4–1 | 8–1 |
| 1982–83 | Hajduk | R2 | (France) Bordeaux | 4–1 | 0–4 | 4–5 |
| 1983–84 | Hajduk | R1 | (Romania) Universitatea Craiova | 1–0 | 0–1 | 1–1 (3–1 p) |
| 1983–84 | Hajduk | R2 | (Hungary) Honvéd | 3–0 | 2–3 | 5–3 |
| 1983–84 | Hajduk | R3 | (Socialist Federal Republic of Yugoslavia) Radnički Niš | 2–0 | 2–0 | 4–0 |
| 1983–84 | Hajduk | QF | (Czechoslovakia) Sparta Prague | 2–0 | 0–1 | 2–1 |
| 1983–84 | Hajduk | SF | (England) Tottenham Hotspur | 2–1 | 0–1 | 2–2 (a) |
| 1984–85 | Rijeka | R1 | (Spain) Valladolid | 4–1 | 0–1 | 4–2 |
| 1984–85 | Rijeka | R2 | (Spain) Real Madrid | 3–1 | 0–3 | 3–4 |
| 1985–86 | Hajduk | R1 | (France) Metz | 5–1 | 2–2 | 7–3 |
| 1985–86 | Hajduk | R2 | (Italy) Torino | 3–1 | 1–1 | 4–2 |
| 1985–86 | Hajduk | R3 | (Soviet Union) Dnipro Dnipropetrovsk | 2–0 | 1–0 | 3–0 |
| 1985–86 | Hajduk | QF | (Belgium) Waregem | 1–0 | 0–1 | 1–1 (4–5 p) |
| 1986–87 | Hajduk | R1 | (Greece) OFI | 4–0 | 0–1 | 4–1 |
| 1986–87 | Hajduk | R2 | (Bulgaria) Trakia Plovdiv | 3–1 | 2–2 | 5–3 |
| 1986–87 | Hajduk | R3 | (Scotland) Dundee United | 0–0 | 0–2 | 0–2 |
| 1986–87 | Rijeka | R1 | (Belgium) Standard Liège | 0–1 | 1–1 | 1–2 |
| 1988–89 | Dinamo | R1 | (Turkey) Beşiktaş | 2–0 | 0–1 | 2–1 |
| 1988–89 | Dinamo | R2 | (West Germany) VfB Stuttgart | 1–3 | 1–1 | 2–4 |
| 1989–90 | Dinamo | QR | (France) Auxerre | 1–3 | 1–0 | 2–3 |
| 1990–91 | Dinamo | R1 | (Italy) Atalanta | 1–1 | 0–0 | 1–1 (a) |
| 1991–92 | Građanski | R1 | (Turkey) Trabzonspor | 2–3 | 1–1 | 3–4 |
| 1992–93 | None | | | | | |
| 1993–94 | None | | | | | |
| 1994–95 | None | | | | | |
| 1995–96 | Osijek | QR | (Slovakia) Slovan Bratislava | 0–2 | 0–4 | 0–6 |
| 1996–97 | Dinamo | PR | (Albania) Tirana | 4–0 | 6–2 | 10–2 |
| 1996–97 | Dinamo | QR | (Russia) Spartak Moscow | 3–1 | 0–2 | 3–3 (a) |
| 1996–97 | Hajduk | PR | (Moldova) Zimbru | 2–1 | 4–0 | 6–1 |
| 1996–97 | Hajduk | QR | (Russia) Torpedo Moscow | 1–0 | 0–2 | 1–2 |
| 1997–98 | Dinamo | R1 | (Switzerland) Grasshopper | 4–4 | 5–0 | 9–4 |
| 1997–98 | Dinamo | R2 | (Hungary) MTK Budapest | 2–0 | 0–1 | 2–1 |
| 1997–98 | Dinamo | R16 | (Spain) Atlético Madrid | 1–1 | 0–1 | 1–2 |
| 1997–98 | Hajduk | QR1 | (Luxembourg) Grevenmacher | 2–0 | 4–1 | 6–1 |
| 1997–98 | Hajduk | QR2 | (Sweden) Malmö FF | 3–2 | 2–0 | 5–2 |
| 1997–98 | Hajduk | R1 | (Germany) Schalke 04 | 2–3 | 0–2 | 2–5 |
| 1998–99 | Hajduk | QR2 | (Sweden) Malmö FF | 1–1 | 2–1 | 3–2 |
| 1998–99 | Hajduk | R1 | (Italy) Fiorentina | 0–0 | 1–2 | 1–2 |
| 1998–99 | Osijek | QR2 | (Belgium) Anderlecht | 3–1 | 0–2 | 3–3 (a) |
| 1999–00 | Hajduk | QR | (Luxembourg) F91 Dudelange | 5–0 | 1–1 | 6–1 |
| 1999–00 | Hajduk | R1 | (Bulgaria) Levski Sofia | 0–0 | 0–3 | 0–3 |
| 1999–00 | Osijek | R1 | (England) West Ham United | 1–3 | 0–3 | 1–6 |
| 2000–01 | Dinamo | R1 | (Slovakia) Slovan Bratislava | 1–1 | 3–0 | 4–1 |
| 2000–01 | Dinamo | R2 | (Italy) Parma | 1–0 | 0–2 | 1–2 |
| 2000–01 | Osijek | R1 | (Denmark) Brøndby | 0–0 | 2–1 | 2–1 |
| 2000–01 | Osijek | R2 | (Austria) Rapid Wien | 2–1 | 2–0 | 4–1 |
| 2000–01 | Osijek | R3 | (Czech Republic) Slavia Prague | 2–0 | 1–5 | 3–5 |
| 2000–01 | Rijeka | QR | (Malta) Valletta | 3–2 | 5–4 (a.e.t.) | 8–6 |
| 2000–01 | Rijeka | R1 | (Spain) Celta Vigo | 0–1 (a.e.t.) | 0–0 | 0–1 |
| 2001–02 | Dinamo | QR | (Estonia) Flora | 1–0 | 1–0 | 2–0 |
| 2001–02 | Dinamo | R1 | (Israel) Maccabi Tel Aviv | 2–2 | 1–1 | 3–3 (a) |
| 2001–02 | Hajduk | R1 | (Poland) Wisła Kraków | 2–2 | 0–1 | 2–3 |
| 2001–02 | Osijek | QR | (Latvia) Dinaburg | 1–0 | 1–2 | 2–2 (a) |
| 2001–02 | Osijek | R1 | (Slovenia) Gorica | 1–0 | 2–1 | 3–1 |
| 2001–02 | Osijek | R2 | (Greece) AEK Athens | 1–2 | 2–3 | 3–5 |
| 2001–02 | Varaždin (as Varteks) | QR | (Liechtenstein) Vaduz | 6–1 | 3–3 | 9–4 |
| 2001–02 | Varaždin (as Varteks) | R1 | (England) Aston Villa | 0–1 | 3–2 | 3–3 (a) |
| 2001–02 | Varaždin (as Varteks) | R2 | (Denmark) Brøndby | 3–1 | 0–5 | 3–6 |
| 2002–03 | Dinamo | R1 | (Hungary) Zalaegerszeg | 6–0 | 3–1 | 9–1 |
| 2002–03 | Dinamo | R2 | (England) Fulham | 0–3 | 1–2 | 1–5 |
| 2002–03 | Hajduk | QR | (Faroe Islands) GÍ Gøta | 3–0 | 8–0 | 11–0 |
| 2002–03 | Hajduk | R1 | (England) Fulham | 0–1 | 2–2 | 2–3 |
| 2002–03 | Varaždin (as Varteks) | QR | (Republic of Ireland) Dundalk | 5–0 | 4–0 | 9–0 |
| 2002–03 | Varaždin (as Varteks) | R1 | (Denmark) Midtjylland | 1–1 | 0–1 | 1–2 |
| 2003–04 | Dinamo | R1 | (Hungary) MTK Budapest | 3–1 | 0–0 | 3–1 |
| 2003–04 | Dinamo | R2 | (Ukraine) Dnipro Dnipropetrovsk | 0–2 | 1–1 | 1–3 |
| 2003–04 | Hajduk | QR | (Finland) Haka | 1–0 | 1–2 | 2–2 (a) |
| 2003–04 | Hajduk | R1 | (Switzerland) Grasshopper | 0–0 | 1–1 | 1–1 (a) |
| 2003–04 | Hajduk | R2 | (Italy) Roma | 1–1 | 0–1 | 1–2 |
| 2003–04 | Kamen Ingrad | QR | (Luxembourg) Etzella Ettelbruck | 7–0 | 2–1 | 9–1 |
| 2003–04 | Kamen Ingrad | R1 | (Germany) Schalke 04 | 0–0 | 0–1 | 0–1 |
| 2003–04 | Varaždin (as Varteks) | QR | (Estonia) Levadia Tallinn | 3–2 | 3–1 | 6–3 |
| 2003–04 | Varaždin (as Varteks) | R1 | (Hungary) Debrecen | 1–3 | 2–3 | 3–6 |
| 2004–05 | Dinamo | QR2 | (Slovenia) Primorje | 4–0 | 0–2 | 4–2 |
| 2004–05 | Dinamo | R1 | (Sweden) Elfsborg | 2–0 | 0–0 | 2–0 |
| 2004–05 | Dinamo | GS | (Belgium) Beveren | 6–1 | | 4th out of 5 |
| 2004–05 | Dinamo | GS | (Portugal) Benfica | | 0–2 | 4th out of 5 |
| 2004–05 | Dinamo | GS | (Netherlands) Heerenveen | 2–2 | | 4th out of 5 |
| 2004–05 | Dinamo | GS | (Germany) VfB Stuttgart | | 1–2 | 4th out of 5 |
| 2004–05 | Rijeka | QR2 | (Turkey) Gençlerbirliği | 2–1 | 0–1 | 2–2 (a) |
| 2005–06 | Inter Zaprešić | QR2 | (Serbia and Montenegro) Red Star | 1–3 | 0–4 | 1–7 |
| 2005–06 | Rijeka | QR2 | (Bulgaria) Litex Lovech | 2–1 | 0–1 | 2–2 (a) |
| 2006–07 | Dinamo | R1 | (France) Auxerre | 1–2 | 1–3 | 2–5 |
| 2006–07 | Rijeka | QR1 | (Cyprus) Omonia | 2–2 | 1–2 | 3–4 |
| 2006–07 | Varaždin (as Varteks) | QR1 | (Albania) Tirana | 1–1 | 0–2 | 1–3 |
| 2007–08 | Dinamo | R1 | (Netherlands) Ajax | 0–1 | 3–2 | 3–3 (a) |
| 2007–08 | Dinamo | GS | (Switzerland) Basel | 0–0 | | 4th out of 5 |
| 2007–08 | Dinamo | GS | (Norway) Brann | | 1–2 | 4th out of 5 |
| 2007–08 | Dinamo | GS | (Germany) Hamburger SV | 0–2 | | 4th out of 5 |
| 2007–08 | Dinamo | GS | (France) Rennes | | 1–1 | 4th out of 5 |
| 2007–08 | Hajduk | QR1 | (Montenegro) Budućnost | 1–0 | 1–1 | 2–1 |
| 2007–08 | Hajduk | QR2 | (Italy) Sampdoria | 0–1 | 1–1 | 1–2 |
| 2007–08 | Slaven Belupo | QR1 | (Albania) Teuta | 6–2 | 2–2 | 8–4 |
| 2007–08 | Slaven Belupo | QR2 | (Turkey) Galatasaray | 1–2 | 1–2 | 2–4 |
| 2008–09 | Dinamo | R1 | (Czech Republic) Sparta Prague | 0–0 | 3–3 | 3–3 (a) |
| 2008–09 | Dinamo | GS | (Netherlands) NEC Nijmegen | 3–2 | | 5th out of 5 |
| 2008–09 | Dinamo | GS | (England) Tottenham Hotspur | | 0–4 | 5th out of 5 |
| 2008–09 | Dinamo | GS | (Russia) Spartak Moscow | 0–1 | | 5th out of 5 |
| 2008–09 | Dinamo | GS | (Italy) Udinese | | 1–2 | 5th out of 5 |
| 2008–09 | Hajduk | QR1 | (Malta) Birkirkara | 4–0 | 3–0 | 7–0 |
| 2008–09 | Hajduk | QR2 | (Spain) Deportivo La Coruña | 0–2 | 0–0 | 0–2 |
| 2008–09 | Slaven Belupo | QR1 | (Malta) Marsaxlokk | 4–0 | 4–0 | 8–0 |
| 2008–09 | Slaven Belupo | QR2 | (Greece) Aris | 2–0 | 0–1 | 2–1 |
| 2008–09 | Slaven Belupo | R1 | (Russia) CSKA Moscow | 1–2 | 0–1 | 1–3 |
UEFA Europa League
| 2009–10 | Dinamo | PO | (Scotland) Heart of Midlothian | 4–0 | 0–2 | 4–2 |
| 2009–10 | Dinamo | GS | (Netherlands) Ajax | 0–2 | 1–2 | 3rd out of 4 |
| 2009–10 | Dinamo | GS | (Belgium) Anderlecht | 0–2 | 1–0 | 3rd out of 4 |
| 2009–10 | Dinamo | GS | (Romania) Timişoara | 1–2 | 3–0 | 3rd out of 4 |
| 2009–10 | Hajduk | QR3 | (Slovakia) Žilina | 0–1 | 1–1 | 1–2 |
| 2009–10 | Rijeka | QR2 | (Luxembourg) Differdange | 3–0 | 0–1 | 3–1 |
| 2009–10 | Rijeka | QR3 | (Ukraine) Metalist Kharkiv | 1–2 | 0–2 | 1–4 |
| 2009–10 | Slaven Belupo | QR1 | (Malta) Birkirkara | 1–0 | 0–0 | 1–0 |
| 2009–10 | Slaven Belupo | QR2 | (North Macedonia) Milano Kumanovo | 8–2 | 4–0 | 12–2 |
| 2009–10 | Slaven Belupo | QR3 | (Norway) Tromsø | 0–2 | 1–2 | 1–4 |
| 2010–11 | Cibalia | QR2 | (Northern Ireland) Cliftonville | 0–0 | 0–1 | 0–1 |
| 2010–11 | Dinamo | PO | (Hungary) Győr | 2–1 | 2–0 | 4–1 |
| 2010–11 | Dinamo | GS | (Belgium) Club Brugge | 0–0 | 2–0 | 3rd out of 4 |
| 2010–11 | Dinamo | GS | (Greece) PAOK | 0–1 | 0–1 | 3rd out of 4 |
| 2010–11 | Dinamo | GS | (Spain) Villarreal | 2–0 | 0–3 | 3rd out of 4 |
| 2010–11 | Hajduk | QR3 | (Romania) Dinamo Bucharest | 3–0 | 1–3 | 4–3 |
| 2010–11 | Hajduk | PO | (Romania) Unirea Urziceni | 4–1 | 1–1 | 5–2 |
| 2010–11 | Hajduk | GS | (Greece) AEK Athens | 1–3 | 1–3 | 4th out of 4 |
| 2010–11 | Hajduk | GS | (Belgium) Anderlecht | 1–0 | 0–2 | 4th out of 4 |
| 2010–11 | Hajduk | GS | (Russia) Zenit Saint Petersburg | 2–3 | 0–2 | 4th out of 4 |
| 2010–11 | Šibenik | QR1 | (Malta) Sliema Wanderers | 0–0 | 3–0 | 3–0 |
| 2010–11 | Šibenik | QR2 | (Cyprus) Anorthosis | 0–3 (a.e.t.) | 2–0 | 2–3 |
| 2011–12 | Hajduk | QR3 | (England) Stoke City | 0–1 | 0–1 | 0–2 |
| 2011–12 | RNK Split | QR2 | (Slovenia) Domžale | 3–1 | 2–1 | 5–2 |
| 2011–12 | RNK Split | QR3 | (England) Fulham | 0–0 | 0–2 | 0–2 |
| 2011–12 | Varaždin | QR1 | (Andorra) Lusitanos | 5–1 | 1–0 | 6–1 |
| 2011–12 | Varaždin | QR2 | (Moldova) Iskra-Stal | 3–1 | 1–1 | 4–2 |
| 2011–12 | Varaždin | QR3 | (Romania) Dinamo București | 1–2 | 2–2 | 3–4 |
| 2012–13 | Hajduk | QR2 | (Latvia) Skonto | 2–0 | 0–1 | 2–1 |
| 2012–13 | Hajduk | QR3 | (Italy) Internazionale | 0–3 | 2–0 | 2–3 |
| 2012–13 | Osijek | QR1 | (Andorra) Santa Coloma | 3–1 | 1–0 | 4–1 |
| 2012–13 | Osijek | QR2 | (Sweden) Kalmar | 1–3 | 0–3 | 1–6 |
| 2012–13 | Slaven Belupo | QR2 | (Northern Ireland) Portadown | 6–0 | 4–2 | 10–2 |
| 2012–13 | Slaven Belupo | QR3 | (Spain) Athletic Bilbao | 2–1 | 1–3 | 3–4 |
| 2013–14 | Dinamo | GS | (Ukraine) Chornomorets | 1–2 | 1–2 | 4th out of 4 |
| 2013–14 | Dinamo | GS | (Bulgaria) Ludogorets Razgrad | 1–2 | 0–3 | 4th out of 4 |
| 2013–14 | Dinamo | GS | (Netherlands) PSV Eindhoven | 0–0 | 0–2 | 4th out of 4 |
| 2013–14 | Hajduk | QR2 | (North Macedonia) Turnovo | 2–1 | 1–1 | 3–2 |
| 2013–14 | Hajduk | QR3 | (Georgia (country)) Dila Gori | 0–1 | 0–1 | 0–2 |
| 2013–14 | Lokomotiva | QR2 | (Belarus) Dinamo Minsk | 2–3 | 2–1 | 4–4 (a) |
| 2013–14 | Rijeka | QR2 | (Wales) Prestatyn Town | 5–0 | 3–0 | 8–0 |
| 2013–14 | Rijeka | QR3 | (Slovakia) Žilina | 2–1 | 1–1 | 3–2 |
| 2013–14 | Rijeka | PO | (Germany) VfB Stuttgart | 2–1 | 2–2 | 4–3 |
| 2013–14 | Rijeka | GS | (Portugal) Vitória de Guimarães | 0–0 | 0–4 | 4th out of 4 |
| 2013–14 | Rijeka | GS | (Spain) Real Betis | 1–1 | 0–0 | 4th out of 4 |
| 2013–14 | Rijeka | GS | (France) Lyon | 1–1 | 0–1 | 4th out of 4 |
| 2014–15 | Dinamo | PO | (Romania) Petrolul Ploiești | 2–1 | 3–1 | 5–2 |
| 2014–15 | Dinamo | GS | (Romania) Astra Giurgiu | 5–1 | 0–1 | 3rd out of 4 |
| 2014–15 | Dinamo | GS | (Scotland) Celtic | 4–3 | 0–1 | 3rd out of 4 |
| 2014–15 | Dinamo | GS | (Austria) Red Bull Salzburg | 1–5 | 2–4 | 3rd out of 4 |
| 2014–15 | Hajduk | QR2 | (Republic of Ireland) Dundalk | 1–2 | 2–0 | 3–2 |
| 2014–15 | Hajduk | QR3 | (Kazakhstan) Shakhter Karagandy | 3–0 | 2–4 | 5–4 |
| 2014–15 | Hajduk | PO | (Ukraine) Dnipro Dnipropetrovsk | 0–0 | 1–2 | 1–2 |
| 2014–15 | RNK Split | QR1 | (Armenia) Mika | 2–0 | 1–1 | 3–1 |
| 2014–15 | RNK Split | QR2 | (Israel) Hapoel Be'er Sheva | 2–1 | 0–0 | 2–1 |
| 2014–15 | RNK Split | QR3 | (Ukraine) Chornomorets | 2–0 | 0–0 | 2–0 |
| 2014–15 | RNK Split | PO | (Italy) Torino | 0–0 | 0–1 | 0–1 |
| 2014–15 | Rijeka | QR2 | (Hungary) Ferencváros | 1–0 | 2–1 | 3–1 |
| 2014–15 | Rijeka | QR3 | (Faroe Islands) Víkingur | 4–0 | 5–1 | 9–1 |
| 2014–15 | Rijeka | PO | (Moldova) Sheriff Tiraspol | 1–0 | 3–0 | 4–0 |
| 2014–15 | Rijeka | GS | (Belgium) Standard Liège | 2–0 | 0–2 | 3rd out of 4 |
| 2014–15 | Rijeka | GS | (Spain) Sevilla | 2–2 | 0–1 | 3rd out of 4 |
| 2014–15 | Rijeka | GS | (Netherlands) Feyenoord | 3–1 | 0–2 | 3rd out of 4 |
| 2015–16 | Hajduk | QR1 | (Estonia) Sillamäe Kalev | 6–2 | 1–1 | 7–3 |
| 2015–16 | Hajduk | QR2 | (Slovenia) Koper | 4–1 | 2–3 | 6–4 |
| 2015–16 | Hajduk | QR3 | (Norway) Strømsgodset | 2–0 | 2–0 | 4–0 |
| 2015–16 | Hajduk | PO | (Czech Republic) Slovan Liberec | 0–1 | 0–1 | 0–2 |
| 2015–16 | Lokomotiva | QR1 | (Wales) Airbus UK Broughton | 2–2 | 3–1 | 5–3 |
| 2015–16 | Lokomotiva | QR2 | (Greece) PAOK | 2–1 | 0–6 | 2–7 |
| 2015–16 | Rijeka | QR2 | (Scotland) Aberdeen | 0–3 | 2–2 | 2–5 |
| 2016–17 | Hajduk | QR2 | (Romania) CSMS Iași | 2–1 | 2–2 | 4–3 |
| 2016–17 | Hajduk | QR3 | (Ukraine) Oleksandriya | 3–1 | 3–0 | 6–1 |
| 2016–17 | Hajduk | PO | (Israel) Maccabi Tel Aviv | 2–1 | 1–2 | 3–3 (3–4 p) |
| 2016–17 | Lokomotiva | QR1 | (Andorra) UE Santa Coloma | 4–1 | 3–1 | 7–2 |
| 2016–17 | Lokomotiva | QR2 | (Finland) RoPS | 3–0 | 1–1 | 4–1 |
| 2016–17 | Lokomotiva | QR3 | (Ukraine) Vorskla Poltava | 0–0 | 3–2 | 3–2 |
| 2016–17 | Lokomotiva | PO | (Belgium) Genk | 2–2 | 0–2 | 2–4 |
| 2016–17 | Rijeka | QR3 | (Turkey) İstanbul Başakşehir | 2–2 | 0–0 | 2–2 (a) |
| 2017–18 | Dinamo | QR3 | (Norway) Odd | 2–1 | 0–0 | 2–1 |
| 2017–18 | Dinamo | PO | (Albania) Skënderbeu | 1–1 | 0–0 | 1–1 (a) |
| 2017–18 | Hajduk | QR2 | (Bulgaria) Levski Sofia | 1–0 | 2–1 | 3–1 |
| 2017–18 | Hajduk | QR3 | (Denmark) Brøndby | 2–0 | 0–0 | 2–0 |
| 2017–18 | Hajduk | PO | (England) Everton | 1–1 | 0–2 | 1–3 |
| 2017–18 | Osijek | QR1 | (Andorra) UE Santa Coloma | 4–0 | 2–0 | 6–0 |
| 2017–18 | Osijek | QR2 | (Switzerland) Luzern | 2–0 | 1–2 | 3–2 |
| 2017–18 | Osijek | QR3 | (Netherlands) PSV Eindhoven | 1–0 | 1–0 | 2–0 |
| 2017–18 | Osijek | PO | Austria Wien | 1–2 | 1–0 | 2–2 (a) |
| 2017–18 | Rijeka | GS | (Greece) AEK Athens | 1–2 | 2–2 | 3rd out of 4 |
| 2017–18 | Rijeka | GS | (Italy) Milan | 2–0 | 2–3 | 3rd out of 4 |
| 2017–18 | Rijeka | GS | Austria Wien | 1–4 | 3–1 | 3rd out of 4 |
| 2018–19 | Dinamo | GS | (Turkey) Fenerbahçe | 4–1 | 0–0 | 1st out of 4 |
| 2018–19 | Dinamo | GS | (Belgium) Anderlecht | 0–0 | 2–0 | 1st out of 4 |
| 2018–19 | Dinamo | GS | (Slovakia) Spartak Trnava | 3–1 | 2–1 | 1st out of 4 |
| 2018–19 | Dinamo | R32 | (Czech Republic) Viktoria Plzeň | 3–0 | 1–2 | 4–2 |
| 2018–19 | Dinamo | R16 | (Portugal) Benfica | 1–0 | 0–3 (a.e.t.) | 1–3 |
| 2018–19 | Hajduk | QR2 | (Bulgaria) Slavia Sofia | 1–0 | 3–2 | 4–2 |
| 2018–19 | Hajduk | QR3 | (Romania) FCSB | 0–0 | 1–2 | 1–2 |
| 2018–19 | Osijek | QR1 | (Moldova) Petrocub Hîncești | 2–1 | 1–1 | 3–2 |
| 2018–19 | Osijek | QR2 | (Scotland) Rangers | 0–1 | 1–1 | 1–2 |
| 2018–19 | Rijeka | QR3 | (Norway) Sarpsborg 08 | 0–1 | 1–1 | 1–2 |
| 2019–20 | Hajduk | QR1 | (Malta) Gżira United | 1–3 | 2–0 | 3–3 (a) |
| 2019–20 | Osijek | QR2 | (Bulgaria) CSKA Sofia | 1–0 | 0–1 | 1–1 (3–4 p) |
| 2019–20 | Rijeka | QR3 | (Scotland) Aberdeen | 2–0 | 2–0 | 4–0 |
| 2019–20 | Rijeka | PO | (Belgium) Gent | 1–1 | 1–2 | 2–3 |
| 2020–21 | Dinamo | PO | (Estonia) Flora | 3–1 | | |
| 2020–21 | Dinamo | GS | (Netherlands) Feyenoord | 0–0 | 2–0 | 1st out of 4 |
| 2020–21 | Dinamo | GS | (Russia) CSKA Moscow | 3–1 | 0–0 | 1st out of 4 |
| 2020–21 | Dinamo | GS | (Austria) Wolfsberger AC | 1–0 | 3–0 | 1st out of 4 |
| 2020–21 | Dinamo | R32 | (Russia) Krasnodar | 1–0 | 3–2 | 4–2 |
| 2020–21 | Dinamo | R16 | (England) Tottenham Hotspur | 3–0 (a.e.t.) | 0–2 | 3–2 |
| 2020–21 | Dinamo | QF | (Spain) Villarreal | 0–1 | 1–2 | 1–3 |
| 2020–21 | Hajduk | QR2 | (North Macedonia) Renova | | 1–0 | |
| 2020–21 | Hajduk | QR3 | (Turkey) Galatasaray | | 0–2 | |
| 2020–21 | Lokomotiva | QR3 | (Sweden) Malmö | | 0–5 | |
| 2020–21 | Osijek | QR2 | (Switzerland) Basel | 1–2 | | |
| 2020–21 | Rijeka | QR3 | (Ukraine) Kolos Kovalivka | 2–0 (a.e.t.) | | |
| 2020–21 | Rijeka | PO | (Denmark) Copenhagen | | 1–0 | |
| 2020–21 | Rijeka | GS | (Spain) Real Sociedad | 0–1 | 2–2 | 4th out of 4 |
| 2020–21 | Rijeka | GS | (Netherlands) AZ | 2–1 | 1–4 | 4th out of 4 |
| 2020–21 | Rijeka | GS | (Italy) Napoli | 1–2 | 0–2 | 4th out of 4 |
| 2021–22 | Dinamo | GS | (England) West Ham United | 0–2 | 1–0 | 2nd out of 4 |
| 2021–22 | Dinamo | GS | (Belgium) Genk | 1–1 | 3–0 | 2nd out of 4 |
| 2021–22 | Dinamo | GS | (Austria) Rapid Wien | 3–1 | 1–2 | 2nd out of 4 |
| 2021–22 | Dinamo | R32 | (Spain) Sevilla | 1–0 | 1–3 | 2–3 |
| 2022–23 | None | | | | | |
| 2023–24 | Dinamo | PO | (Czech Republic) Sparta Prague | 3–1 | 1–4 | 4–5 |
| 2024–25 | Rijeka | QR2 | (Romania) Corvinul | 1–0 | 0–0 | 1–0 |
| 2024–25 | Rijeka | QR3 | (Sweden) Elfsborg | 1–1 | 0–2 | 1–3 |
| 2025–26 | Dinamo | LP | (Turkey) Fenerbahce | 3–1 | | 23rd out of 36 |
| 2025–26 | Dinamo | LP | (Israel) Maccabi Tel Aviv | | 3–1 | 23rd out of 36 |
| 2025–26 | Dinamo | LP | (Sweden) Malmö | | 1–1 | 23rd out of 36 |
| 2025–26 | Dinamo | LP | (Spain) Celta Vigo | 0–3 | | 23rd out of 36 |
| 2025–26 | Dinamo | LP | (France) Lille | | 0–4 | 23rd out of 36 |
| 2025–26 | Dinamo | LP | (Spain) Real Betis | 1–3 | | 23rd out of 36 |
| 2025–26 | Dinamo | LP | (Romania) FCSB | 4–1 | | 23rd out of 36 |
| 2025–26 | Dinamo | LP | (Denmark) Midtjylland | | 0–2 | 23rd out of 36 |
| 2025–26 | Dinamo | KPO | (Belgium) Genk | 1–2 | 3–3 (a.e.t.) | 4–6 |
| 2025–26 | Rijeka | QR3 | (Republic of Ireland) Shelbourne | 1–2 | 3–1 | 4–3 |
| 2025–26 | Rijeka | PO | (Greece) PAOK | 1–0 | 0–5 | 1–5 |
| 2026–27 | Hajduk | QR1 | (Slovakia) Žilina | 2–0 | 1–2 | 3–2 |
| 2026–27 | Hajduk | QR2 | (Cyprus) Pafos | 2–0 | 0–4 (a.e.t.) | 2–4 |
| 2026–27 | Dinamo | LP | (Israel) Hapoel Be'er Sheva | | 0–0 | TBD |
| 2026–27 | Dinamo | LP | (Belgium) Anderlecht | 1–0 | | TBD |
| 2026–27 | Dinamo | LP | (Netherlands) NEC | 22 Oct | | TBD |
| 2026–27 | Dinamo | LP | (England) Sunderland | | 5 Nov | TBD |
| 2026–27 | Dinamo | LP | (Germany) Bayer Leverkusen | 26 Nov | | TBD |
| 2026–27 | Dinamo | LP | (France) Rennes | | 10 Dec | TBD |
| 2026–27 | Dinamo | LP | (Netherlands) AZ | | 21 Jan | TBD |
| 2026–27 | Dinamo | LP | (Austria) Sturm Graz | 28 Jan | | TBD |

Current format: QR1/QR2/QR3 = First/Second/Third qualifying round; PO = Playoff; LP = League phase; KPO = Knockout round play-offs; R16 = Round of 16; QF = Quarter-finals; SF = Semi-finals; F = Final.

Former formats: PR = Preliminary round; QR = Qualifying round; R1/R2 = First/Second round; GS = Group stage; R32 = Round of 32.

==== UEFA Conference League ====
| Season | Club | Round | Opponent | Home | Away | Agg. |
|---|---|---|---|---|---|---|
UEFA Europa Conference League
| 2021–22 | Hajduk | QR2 | (Kazakhstan) Tobol | 2–0 | 1–4 (a.e.t.) | 3–4 |
| 2021–22 | Osijek | QR2 | (Poland) Pogoń Szczecin | 1–0 | 0–0 | 1–0 |
| 2021–22 | Osijek | QR3 | (Bulgaria) CSKA Sofia | 1–1 | 2–4 | 3–5 |
| 2021–22 | Rijeka | QR2 | (Malta) Gżira United | 1–0 | 2–0 | 3–0 |
| 2021–22 | Rijeka | QR3 | (Scotland) Hibernian | 4–1 | 1–1 | 5–2 |
| 2021–22 | Rijeka | PO | (Greece) PAOK | 0–2 | 1–1 | 1–3 |
| 2022–23 | Hajduk | QR3 | (Portugal) Vitória de Guimarães | 3–1 | 0–1 | 3–2 |
| 2022–23 | Hajduk | PO | (Spain) Villarreal | 2–4 | 0–2 | 2–6 |
| 2022–23 | Osijek | QR2 | (Kazakhstan) Kyzylzhar | 0–2 | 2–1 | 2–3 |
| 2022–23 | Rijeka | QR2 | (Sweden) Djurgården IF | 1–2 | 0–2 | 1–4 |
| 2023–24 | Dinamo | GS | (Czech Republic) Viktoria Plzeň | 0–1 | 0–1 | 2nd out of 4 |
| 2023–24 | Dinamo | GS | (Kazakhstan) Astana | 5–1 | 2–0 | 2nd out of 4 |
| 2023–24 | Dinamo | GS | (Kosovo) Ballkani | 3–0 | 0–2 | 2nd out of 4 |
| 2023–24 | Dinamo | KPO | (Spain) Real Betis | 1–1 | 1–0 | 2–1 |
| 2023–24 | Dinamo | R16 | (Greece) PAOK | 2–0 | 1–5 | 3–5 |
| 2023–24 | Hajduk | QR3 | (Greece) PAOK | 0–0 | 0–3 | 0–3 |
| 2023–24 | Osijek | QR2 | (Hungary) Zalaegerszeg | 1–0 | 2–1 | 3–1 |
| 2023–24 | Osijek | QR3 | (Turkey) Adana Demirspor | 3–2 | 1–5 | 4–7 |
| 2023–24 | Rijeka | QR2 | (Kosovo) Dukagjini | 6–1 | 1–0 | 7–1 |
| 2023–24 | Rijeka | QR3 | (Faroe Islands) B36 Tórshavn | 2–0 | 3–1 | 5–1 |
| 2023–24 | Rijeka | PO | (France) Lille | 1–1 (a.e.t.) | 1–2 | 2–3 |
UEFA Conference League
| 2024–25 | Hajduk | QR2 | (Faroe Islands) HB | 2–0 | 0–0 | 2–0 |
| 2024–25 | Hajduk | QR3 | (Slovakia) Ružomberok | 0–1 | 0–0 | 0–1 |
| 2024–25 | Osijek | QR2 | (Estonia) Levadia | 5–1 | 1–0 | 6–1 |
| 2024–25 | Osijek | QR3 | (Azerbaijan) Zira | 1–1 | 2–2 | 3–3 (1–2 p) |
| 2024–25 | Rijeka | PO | (Slovenia) Olimpija | 1–1 | 0–5 | 1–6 |
| 2025–26 | Hajduk | QR2 | (Azerbaijan) Zira | 2–1 (a.e.t.) | 1–1 | 3–2 |
| 2025–26 | Hajduk | QR3 | (Albania) Dinamo City | 2–1 | 1–3 (a.e.t.) | 3–4 |
| 2025–26 | Rijeka | LP | (Armenia) Noah | | 0–1 | 16th out of 36 |
| 2025–26 | Rijeka | LP | (Czech Republic) Sparta Prague | 1–0 | | 16th out of 36 |
| 2025–26 | Rijeka | LP | (Gibraltar) Lincoln Red Imps | | 1–1 | 16th out of 36 |
| 2025–26 | Rijeka | LP | (Cyprus) AEK Larnaca | 0–0 | | 16th out of 36 |
| 2025–26 | Rijeka | LP | (Slovenia) Celje | 3–0 | | 16th out of 36 |
| 2025–26 | Rijeka | LP | (Ukraine) Shakhtar Donetsk | | 0–0 | 16th out of 36 |
| 2025–26 | Rijeka | KPO | (Cyprus) Omonia | 3–1 | 1–0 | 4–1 |
| 2025–26 | Rijeka | R16 | (France) Strasbourg | 1–2 | 1–1 | 2–3 |
| 2025–26 | Varaždin | QR2 | (Portugal) Santa Clara | 2–1 | 0–2 | 2–3 |
| 2026–27 | Hajduk | QR3 | (Lithuania) Žalgiris | 4–0 | 5–2 | 9–2 |
| 2026–27 | Hajduk | PO | (Poland) Raków Częstochowa | 2–2 | 3–2 (a.e.t.) | 5–4 |
| 2026–27 | Hajduk | LP | (Netherlands) Ajax | 2–1 | | TBD |
| 2026–27 | Hajduk | LP | (Switzerland) Thun | | 22 Oct | TBD |
| 2026–27 | Hajduk | LP | (Gibraltar) Lincoln Red Imps | | 5 Nov | TBD |
| 2026–27 | Hajduk | LP | (Cyprus) Sint-Truiden | 26 Nov | | TBD |
| 2026–27 | Hajduk | LP | (Denmark) Nordsjælland | 10 Dec | | TBD |
| 2026–27 | Hajduk | LP | (Denmark) Midtjylland | | 17 Dec | TBD |
| 2026–27 | Rijeka | QR2 | (Republic of Ireland) Derry City | 1–0 | 1–0 | 2–0 |
| 2026–27 | Rijeka | QR3 | (Finland) Ilves | 1–0 | 1–1 | 2–1 |
| 2026–27 | Rijeka | PO | (Denmark) Midtjylland | 1–4 | 0–2 | 1–6 |
| 2026–27 | Varaždin | QR2 | (Czech Republic) Jablonec | 3–2 | 0–2 | 3–4 |

Current format: QR1/QR2/QR3 = First/Second/Third qualifying round; PO = Playoff; LP = League phase; KPO = Knockout round play-offs; R16 = Round of 16; QF = Quarter-finals; SF = Semi-finals; F = Final.

Former formats: GS = Group stage.

=== Defunct ===
==== Cup Winners' Cup ====
| Season | Club | Round | Opponent | Home | Away | Agg. |
|---|---|---|---|---|---|---|
European Cup Winners' Cup
| 1960–61 | Dinamo | QF | (Czechoslovakia) RH Brno | 2–0 | 0–0 | 2–0 |
| 1960–61 | Dinamo | SF | (Italy) Fiorentina | 2–1 | 0–3 | 2–4 |
| 1963–64 | Dinamo | QR | (Austria) Linzer ASK | 1–0 | 0–1 | 1–1, (po 1–1) |
| 1963–64 | Dinamo | R1 | (Scotland) Celtic | 2–1 | 0–3 | 2–4 |
| 1964–65 | Dinamo | R1 | (Greece) AEK Athens | 3–0 | 0–2 | 3–2 |
| 1964–65 | Dinamo | R2 | (Romania) Steaua București | 2–0 | 3–1 | 5–1 |
| 1964–65 | Dinamo | QF | (Italy) Torino | 1–2 | 1–1 | 2–3 |
| 1965–66 | Dinamo | R1 | (Spain) Atlético Madrid | 0–1 | 0–4 | 0–5 |
| 1967–68 | Hajduk | R1 | (England) Tottenham Hotspur | 0–2 | 3–4 | 3–6 |
| 1969–70 | Dinamo | R1 | (Czechoslovakia) Slovan Bratislava | 3–0 | 0–0 | 3–0 |
| 1969–70 | Dinamo | R2 | (France) Marseille | 2–0 | 1–1 | 3–1 |
| 1969–70 | Dinamo | QF | (West Germany) Schalke 04 | 1–3 | 0–1 | 1–4 |
| 1972–73 | Hajduk | R1 | (Norway) Fredrikstad | 1–0 | 1–0 | 2–0 |
| 1972–73 | Hajduk | R2 | (Wales) Wrexham | 2–0 | 1–3 | 3–3 (a) |
| 1972–73 | Hajduk | QF | (Scotland) Hibernian | 3–0 | 2–4 | 5–4 |
| 1972–73 | Hajduk | SF | (England) Leeds United | 0–0 | 0–1 | 0–1 |
| 1973–74 | Dinamo | R1 | (Italy) Milan | 1–3 | 0–1 | 1–4 |
| 1976–77 | Hajduk | R1 | (Belgium) Lierse | 3–0 | 0–1 | 3–1 |
| 1976–77 | Hajduk | R2 | (Spain) Atlético Madrid | 1–2 | 0–1 | 1–3 |
| 1977–78 | Hajduk | R1 | (Republic of Ireland) Dundalk | 4–0 | 0–1 | 4–1 |
| 1977–78 | Hajduk | R2 | (Hungary) Diósgyőr | 2–1 | 1–2 | 3–3 (4–3 p) |
| 1977–78 | Hajduk | QF | Austria Wien | 1–1 | 1–1 | 2–2 (0–3 p) |
| 1978–79 | Rijeka | R1 | (Wales) Wrexham | 3–0 | 0–2 | 3–2 |
| 1978–79 | Rijeka | R2 | (Belgium) Beveren | 0–0 | 0–2 | 0–2 |
| 1979–80 | Rijeka | R1 | (Belgium) Beerschot | 2–1 | 0–0 | 2–1 |
| 1979–80 | Rijeka | R2 | (Czechoslovakia) Lokomotiva Košice | 3–0 | 0–2 | 3–2 |
| 1979–80 | Rijeka | QF | (Italy) Juventus | 0–0 | 0–2 | 0–2 |
| 1980–81 | Dinamo | R1 | (Portugal) Benfica | 0–0 | 0–2 | 0–2 |
| 1983–84 | Dinamo | R1 | (Portugal) Porto | 2–1 | 0–1 | 2–2 (a) |
| 1984–85 | Hajduk | R1 | (Soviet Union) Dynamo Moscow | 2–5 | 0–1 | 2–6 |
| 1987–88 | Hajduk | R1 | (Denmark) AaB | 1–0 | 0–1 | 1–1 (4–2 p) |
| 1987–88 | Hajduk | R2 | (France) Marseille | 0–3^{†} | 0–4 | 0–7 |
| 1991–92 | Hajduk | R1 | (England) Tottenham Hotspur | 1–0 | 0–2 | 1–2 |
| 1992–93 | None | | | | | |
| 1993–94 | Hajduk | R1 | (Netherlands) Ajax | 1–0 | 0–6 | 1–6 |
UEFA Cup Winners' Cup
| 1994–95 | Croatia | R1 | (France) Auxerre | 3–1 | 0–3 | 3–4 |
| 1995–96 | None | | | | | |
| 1996–97 | Varaždin (as Varteks) | QR | Union Luxembourg | 2–1 | 3–0 | 5–1 |
| 1996–97 | Varaždin (as Varteks) | R1 | (Russia) Lokomotiv Moscow | 2–1 | 0–1 | 2–2 (a) |
| 1997–98 | Zagreb | QR | (North Macedonia) Sloga Jugomagnat | 2–0 | 2–1 | 4–1 |
| 1997–98 | Zagreb | R1 | (Norway) Tromsø | 3–2 | 2–4 | 5–6 |
| 1998–99 | Varaždin (as Varteks) | R1 | (Slovenia) Rudar Velenje | 1–0 | 1–0 | 2–0 |
| 1998–99 | Varaždin (as Varteks) | R2 | (Netherlands) Heerenveen | 4–2 (a.e.t.) | 1–2 | 5–4 |
| 1998–99 | Varaždin (as Varteks) | QF | (Spain) Mallorca | 0–0 | 1–3 | 1–3 |

QR = Qualifying round; R1/R2 = First/Second round; QF = Quarter-finals; SF = Semi-finals.
^{†} Game originally finished 2–0 for Hajduk Split, but was later awarded 0–3 for Marseille because of crowd trouble. In addition, Hajduk was banned for two years from all European competitions.

==== UEFA Intertoto Cup ====
| Season | Club | Round | Opponent | Home | Away | Agg. |
|---|---|---|---|---|---|---|
| 1995 | Zagreb | GS | (Austria) LASK | 0–0 | | 3rd out of 5 |
| 1995 | Zagreb | GS | (Iceland) Keflavík | | 0–0 | 3rd out of 5 |
| 1995 | Zagreb | GS | (France) Metz | 0–1 | | 3rd out of 5 |
| 1995 | Zagreb | GS | (Scotland) Partick Thistle | | 2–1 | 3rd out of 5 |
| 1996 | Segesta | GS | (Sweden) Örgryte | 1–1 | | 1st out of 5 |
| 1996 | Segesta | GS | (Israel) Hapoel Tel Aviv | | 3–1 | 1st out of 5 |
| 1996 | Segesta | GS | (France) Rennes | 2–1 | | 1st out of 5 |
| 1996 | Segesta | GS | (Switzerland) Luzern | | 1–0 | 1st out of 5 |
| 1996 | Segesta | SF | (Sweden) Örebro | 4–0 | 1–4 | 5–4 |
| 1996 | Segesta | Final | (Denmark) Silkeborg | 1–2 | 1–0 | 2–2 (a) |
| 1997 | Hrvatski Dragovoljac | GS | (France) Bastia | 0–1 | | 4th out of 5 |
| 1997 | Hrvatski Dragovoljac | GS | (Denmark) Silkeborg | | 0–5 | 4th out of 5 |
| 1997 | Hrvatski Dragovoljac | GS | (Wales) Ebbw Vale | 4–0 | | 4th out of 5 |
| 1997 | Hrvatski Dragovoljac | GS | (Austria) Grazer AK | | 3–1 | 4th out of 5 |
| 1998 | Hrvatski Dragovoljac | R1 | (Denmark) Lyngby | 1–4 | 1–0 | 2–4 |
| 1999 | Hrvatski Dragovoljac | R1 | (Northern Ireland) Newry City | 1–0 | 0–2 | 1–2 |
| 1999 | Varaždin (as Varteks) | R1 | (Belarus) Lokomotiv-96 Vitebsk | 2–2 | 2–1 | 4–3 |
| 1999 | Varaždin (as Varteks) | R2 | (Norway) Brann | 3–0 | 0–3 | 3–3 (5–4 p) |
| 1999 | Varaždin (as Varteks) | R3 | (Russia) Rostselmash | 1–2 | 1–0 | 2–2 (a) |
| 2000 | Cibalia | R1 | (Federal Republic of Yugoslavia) Obilić | 3–1 | 1–1 | 4–2 |
| 2000 | Cibalia | R2 | (Hungary) Tatabánya | 0–0 | 2–3 | 2–3 |
| 2000 | Slaven Belupo | R1 | (Northern Ireland) Glenavon | 3–0 | 1–1 | 4–1 |
| 2000 | Slaven Belupo | R2 | (Poland) Zagłębie Lubin | 0–0 | 1–1 | 1–1 (a) |
| 2000 | Slaven Belupo | R3 | (Czech Republic) Sigma Olomouc | 1–1 | 0–1 | 1–2 |
| 2001 | Slaven Belupo | R1 | (Cyprus) Anorthosis | 7–0 | 2–0 | 9–0 |
| 2001 | Slaven Belupo | R2 | (France) Bastia | 1–0 | 1–0 | 2–0 |
| 2001 | Slaven Belupo | R3 | (England) Aston Villa | 2–1 | 0–2 | 2–3 |
| 2001 | Zagreb | R1 | (North Macedonia) Pobeda | 1–2 | 1–1 | 2–3 |
| 2002 | Rijeka | R1 | (Republic of Ireland) St Patrick's Athletic | 3–2 | 0–1 | 3–3 (a) |
| 2002 | Slaven Belupo | R1 | (Slovakia) Trenčín | 5–0 | 1–3 | 6–3 |
| 2002 | Slaven Belupo | R2 | (Portugal) Belenenses | 2–0 | 1–0 | 3–0 |
| 2002 | Slaven Belupo | R3 | (Bulgaria) Marek Dupnitsa | 3–1 | 3–0 | 6–1 |
| 2002 | Slaven Belupo | SF | (Germany) VfB Stuttgart | 0–1 | 1–2 | 1–3 |
| 2003 | Cibalia | R2 | (Belarus) Shakhtyor Soligorsk | 4–2 | 1–1 | 5–3 |
| 2003 | Cibalia | R3 | (Finland) Tampere United | 0–1 | 2–0 | 2–1 |
| 2003 | Cibalia | SF | (Germany) VfL Wolfsburg | 1–4 | 0–4 | 1–8 |
| 2003 | Zagreb | R1 | (Slovenia) Koper | 2–2 | 0–1 | 2–3 |
| 2004 | Kamen Ingrad | R2 | (Russia) Spartak Moscow | 0–1 | 1–4 | 1–5 |
| 2004 | Slaven Belupo | R1 | (Malta) Hibernians | 3–0 | 1–2 | 4–2 |
| 2004 | Slaven Belupo | R2 | (Albania) Vllaznia | 2–0 | 0–1 | 2–1 |
| 2004 | Slaven Belupo | R3 | (Slovakia) Spartak Trnava | 0–0 | 2–2 | 2–2 (a) |
| 2004 | Slaven Belupo | SF | (France) Lille | 1–1 | 0–3 | 1–4 |
| 2005 | Slaven Belupo | R1 | (Slovenia) Drava Ptuj | 1–0 | 1–0 | 2–0 |
| 2005 | Slaven Belupo | R2 | (Romania) Gloria Bistriţa | 3–2 | 1–0 | 4–2 |
| 2005 | Slaven Belupo | R3 | (Spain) Deportivo La Coruña | 0–3 | 0–1 | 0–4 |
| 2005 | Varaždin (as Varteks) | R1 | (Albania) Dinamo Tirana | 4–1 | 1–2 | 5–3 |
| 2005 | Varaždin (as Varteks) | R2 | (Finland) Inter Turku | 4–3 | 2–2 | 6–5 |
| 2005 | Varaždin (as Varteks) | R3 | (France) Lens | 1–1 | 1–4 | 2–5 |
| 2006 | Osijek | R2 | (Cyprus) Ethnikos Achna | 2–2 | 0–0 | 2–2 (a) |
| 2007 | Zagreb | R1 | (Albania) Vllaznia | 2–1 | 0–1 | 2–2 (a) |
| 2008 | Rijeka | R1 | (North Macedonia) Renova | 0–0 | 0–2 | 0–2 |

GS = Group stage; R1/R2/R3 = First/Second/Third round; SF = Semi-finals.

== Record by country of opposition ==
Updated on 28 August 2025.

| Country | Pld | W | D | L | GF | GA | GD | Win% |
|---|---|---|---|---|---|---|---|---|
| Albania | 18 | 9 | 4 | 5 | 38 | 22 | +16 | 50.00 |
| Andorra | 8 | 8 | 0 | 0 | 23 | 4 | +19 | 100.00 |
| Armenia | 4 | 2 | 2 | 0 | 6 | 1 | +5 | 50.00 |
| Austria | 36 | 14 | 10 | 12 | 47 | 42 | +5 | 38.89 |
| Azerbaijan | 10 | 5 | 5 | 0 | 18 | 7 | +11 | 50.00 |
| Belarus | 6 | 3 | 2 | 1 | 13 | 10 | +3 | 50.00 |
| Belgium | 35 | 15 | 9 | 11 | 45 | 32 | +13 | 42.86 |
| Bulgaria | 26 | 14 | 5 | 7 | 44 | 34 | +10 | 53.85 |
| Cyprus | 10 | 5 | 3 | 2 | 19 | 9 | +10 | 50.00 |
| Czech Republic | 14 | 3 | 3 | 8 | 15 | 21 | −6 | 21.43 |
| Czechoslovakia | 10 | 4 | 3 | 3 | 13 | 7 | +6 | 40.00 |
| Denmark | 20 | 9 | 3 | 8 | 19 | 25 | −6 | 45.00 |
| East Germany | 2 | 0 | 1 | 1 | 2 | 4 | −2 | 0.00 |
| England | 44 | 9 | 6 | 29 | 32 | 74 | −42 | 20.45 |
| Estonia | 9 | 8 | 1 | 0 | 24 | 8 | +16 | 88.89 |
| Faroe Islands | 10 | 9 | 1 | 0 | 38 | 2 | +36 | 90.00 |
| Finland | 10 | 6 | 2 | 2 | 17 | 10 | +7 | 60.00 |
| France | 39 | 9 | 9 | 21 | 43 | 77 | −34 | 23.08 |
| Georgia | 6 | 4 | 0 | 2 | 8 | 2 | +6 | 66.67 |
| Germany | 18 | 1 | 2 | 15 | 14 | 48 | −34 | 5.56 |
| Greece | 36 | 7 | 7 | 22 | 37 | 62 | −25 | 19.44 |
| Hungary | 33 | 15 | 7 | 11 | 49 | 37 | +12 | 45.45 |
| Iceland | 5 | 4 | 1 | 0 | 14 | 3 | +11 | 80.00 |
| Ireland | 12 | 7 | 0 | 5 | 26 | 13 | +13 | 58.33 |
| Israel | 9 | 4 | 4 | 1 | 18 | 10 | +8 | 44.44 |
| Italy | 41 | 8 | 9 | 24 | 32 | 63 | −31 | 19.51 |
| Kazakhstan | 12 | 9 | 0 | 3 | 26 | 12 | +14 | 75.00 |
| Kosovo | 4 | 3 | 0 | 1 | 10 | 3 | +7 | 75.00 |
| Latvia | 4 | 2 | 0 | 2 | 4 | 3 | +1 | 50.00 |
| Liechtenstein | 2 | 1 | 1 | 0 | 9 | 4 | +5 | 50.00 |
| Lithuania | 4 | 4 | 0 | 0 | 13 | 3 | +10 | 100.00 |
| Luxembourg | 14 | 11 | 2 | 1 | 39 | 6 | +33 | 78.57 |
| Malta | 20 | 16 | 2 | 2 | 53 | 12 | +41 | 80.00 |
| Moldova | 16 | 10 | 5 | 1 | 28 | 10 | +18 | 62.50 |
| Montenegro | 2 | 1 | 1 | 0 | 2 | 1 | +1 | 50.00 |
| Netherlands | 28 | 11 | 5 | 12 | 28 | 43 | −15 | 39.29 |
| North Macedonia | 15 | 9 | 4 | 2 | 30 | 15 | +15 | 60.00 |
| Northern Ireland | 10 | 5 | 3 | 2 | 18 | 6 | +12 | 50.00 |
| Norway | 21 | 9 | 5 | 7 | 30 | 25 | +5 | 42.86 |
| Poland | 10 | 4 | 5 | 1 | 11 | 5 | +6 | 40.00 |
| Portugal | 23 | 8 | 3 | 12 | 16 | 32 | −16 | 34.78 |
| Romania | 31 | 17 | 6 | 8 | 54 | 34 | +20 | 54.84 |
| Russia | 19 | 7 | 1 | 11 | 19 | 26 | −7 | 36.84 |
| Scotland | 22 | 9 | 5 | 8 | 32 | 27 | +5 | 40.91 |
| Serbia and Montenegro | 8 | 2 | 1 | 5 | 11 | 16 | −5 | 25.00 |
| Slovakia | 17 | 6 | 6 | 5 | 25 | 20 | +5 | 35.29 |
| Slovenia | 26 | 18 | 3 | 5 | 45 | 29 | +16 | 69.23 |
| Soviet Union | 4 | 2 | 0 | 2 | 5 | 6 | −1 | 50.00 |
| Spain | 46 | 8 | 11 | 27 | 36 | 74 | −38 | 17.39 |
| Sweden | 18 | 6 | 4 | 8 | 23 | 30 | −7 | 33.33 |
| Switzerland | 11 | 3 | 5 | 3 | 17 | 12 | +5 | 27.27 |
| Turkey | 17 | 6 | 4 | 7 | 21 | 23 | −2 | 35.29 |
| Ukraine | 23 | 5 | 7 | 11 | 26 | 34 | −8 | 21.74 |
| Wales | 11 | 8 | 1 | 2 | 30 | 9 | +21 | 72.73 |
| West Germany | 8 | 2 | 2 | 4 | 11 | 14 | −3 | 25.00 |
| Yugoslavia | 2 | 2 | 0 | 0 | 4 | 0 | +4 | 100.00 |

== Record by opponent ==
The list only includes clubs that Croatian clubs have faced in four or more UEFA matches. Updated on 28 August 2025.

| Club | Pld | W | D | L | GF | GA | GD | Win% |
|---|---|---|---|---|---|---|---|---|
| (Albania) Dinamo City | 4 | 2 | 0 | 2 | 8 | 7 | +1 | 50.00 |
| (Albania) Skënderbeu | 4 | 2 | 2 | 0 | 7 | 3 | +4 | 50.00 |
| (Albania) Tirana | 4 | 2 | 1 | 1 | 11 | 5 | +6 | 50.00 |
| (Albania) Vllaznia Shkodër | 4 | 2 | 0 | 2 | 4 | 3 | +1 | 50.00 |
| (Andorra) UE Santa Coloma | 4 | 4 | 0 | 0 | 13 | 2 | +11 | 100.00 |
| Austria Wien | 8 | 3 | 2 | 3 | 11 | 13 | −2 | 37.50 |
| (Austria) Rapid Wien | 9 | 4 | 2 | 3 | 13 | 9 | +4 | 44.44 |
| (Austria) Red Bull Salzburg | 11 | 2 | 5 | 4 | 12 | 17 | −5 | 18.18 |
| (Azerbaijan) Zira | 4 | 1 | 3 | 0 | 6 | 5 | +1 | 25.00 |
| (Belgium) Anderlecht | 10 | 5 | 2 | 3 | 9 | 8 | +1 | 50.00 |
| (Belgium) Beveren | 5 | 2 | 1 | 2 | 10 | 7 | +3 | 40.00 |
| (Belgium) Genk | 4 | 1 | 2 | 1 | 6 | 5 | +1 | 25.00 |
| (Belgium) Standard Liège | 4 | 1 | 1 | 2 | 3 | 4 | −1 | 25.00 |
| (Bulgaria) CSKA Sofia | 4 | 1 | 1 | 2 | 4 | 6 | −2 | 25.00 |
| (Bulgaria) Levski Sofia | 4 | 2 | 1 | 1 | 3 | 4 | −1 | 50.00 |
| (Bulgaria) Ludogorets Razgrad | 8 | 3 | 2 | 3 | 12 | 14 | −2 | 37.50 |
| (Cyprus) Anorthosis Famagusta | 4 | 3 | 0 | 1 | 11 | 3 | +8 | 75.00 |
| (Cyprus) Omonia | 4 | 2 | 1 | 1 | 6 | 4 | +2 | 50.00 |
| (Czech Republic) Sparta Prague | 6 | 2 | 2 | 2 | 9 | 9 | +0 | 33.33 |
| (Czech Republic) Viktoria Plzeň | 4 | 1 | 0 | 3 | 4 | 4 | +0 | 25.00 |
| (Denmark) AaB | 4 | 2 | 0 | 2 | 2 | 3 | −1 | 50.00 |
| (Denmark) Brøndby | 6 | 3 | 2 | 1 | 7 | 7 | +0 | 50.00 |
| (England) Arsenal | 7 | 2 | 0 | 5 | 5 | 14 | −9 | 28.57 |
| (England) Aston Villa | 4 | 2 | 0 | 2 | 5 | 6 | −1 | 50.00 |
| (England) Fulham | 6 | 0 | 2 | 4 | 3 | 10 | −7 | 0.00 |
| (England) Tottenham Hotspur | 9 | 3 | 0 | 6 | 9 | 16 | −7 | 33.33 |
| (England) West Ham United | 4 | 1 | 0 | 3 | 2 | 8 | −6 | 25.00 |
| (Estonia) Levadia | 4 | 4 | 0 | 0 | 12 | 4 | +8 | 100.00 |
| (France) Auxerre | 6 | 2 | 0 | 4 | 7 | 12 | −5 | 33.33 |
| (France) Lille | 4 | 0 | 2 | 2 | 3 | 7 | −4 | 0.00 |
| (France) Lyon | 6 | 0 | 1 | 5 | 2 | 15 | −13 | 0.00 |
| (France) Marseille | 6 | 1 | 2 | 3 | 6 | 12 | −6 | 16.67 |
| (Germany) Schalke 04 | 6 | 0 | 1 | 5 | 3 | 10 | −7 | 0.00 |
| (Germany) VfB Stuttgart | 9 | 2 | 3 | 4 | 13 | 15 | −2 | 22.22 |
| (Greece) AEK Athens | 10 | 1 | 2 | 7 | 14 | 21 | −7 | 10.00 |
| (Greece) Olympiacos | 6 | 1 | 1 | 4 | 9 | 13 | −4 | 16.67 |
| (Greece) PAOK | 12 | 3 | 2 | 7 | 7 | 25 | −18 | 25.00 |
| (Hungary) Debrecen | 4 | 0 | 0 | 4 | 3 | 14 | −11 | 0.00 |
| (Hungary) Ferencváros | 7 | 3 | 3 | 1 | 9 | 4 | +5 | 42.86 |
| (Hungary) MTK Budapest | 6 | 3 | 2 | 1 | 7 | 2 | +5 | 50.00 |
| (Hungary) Zalaegerszeg | 6 | 5 | 0 | 1 | 14 | 4 | +10 | 83.33 |
| (Republic of Ireland) Dundalk | 6 | 4 | 0 | 2 | 11 | 3 | +8 | 66.67 |
| (Republic of Ireland) Shelbourne | 4 | 2 | 0 | 2 | 7 | 7 | +0 | 50.00 |
| (Israel) Hapoel Be'er Sheva | 4 | 2 | 2 | 0 | 9 | 3 | +6 | 50.00 |
| (Israel) Maccabi Tel Aviv | 4 | 1 | 2 | 1 | 6 | 6 | +0 | 25.00 |
| (Italy) Atalanta | 4 | 1 | 2 | 1 | 5 | 3 | +2 | 25.00 |
| (Italy) Fiorentina | 4 | 1 | 1 | 2 | 3 | 6 | −3 | 25.00 |
| (Italy) Juventus | 4 | 0 | 1 | 3 | 0 | 8 | −8 | 0.00 |
| (Italy) Milan | 9 | 2 | 0 | 7 | 9 | 21 | −12 | 22.22 |
| (Italy) Torino | 8 | 2 | 3 | 3 | 8 | 9 | −1 | 25.00 |
| (Kazakhstan) Astana | 6 | 6 | 0 | 0 | 16 | 1 | +15 | 100.00 |
| (Luxembourg) Fola Esch | 4 | 3 | 1 | 0 | 10 | 1 | +9 | 75.00 |
| (Malta) Birkirkara | 4 | 3 | 1 | 0 | 8 | 0 | +8 | 75.00 |
| (Malta) Gżira United | 4 | 3 | 0 | 1 | 6 | 3 | +3 | 75.00 |
| (Moldova) Sheriff Tiraspol | 10 | 6 | 3 | 1 | 15 | 5 | +10 | 60.00 |
| (Netherlands) Ajax | 12 | 3 | 2 | 7 | 6 | 22 | −16 | 25.00 |
| (Netherlands) Feyenoord | 4 | 2 | 1 | 1 | 5 | 3 | +2 | 50.00 |
| (Netherlands) PSV Eindhoven | 6 | 3 | 1 | 2 | 4 | 5 | −1 | 50.00 |
| (Norway) Tromsø | 4 | 1 | 0 | 3 | 6 | 10 | −4 | 25.00 |
| (Poland) Legia Warsaw | 4 | 3 | 1 | 0 | 7 | 1 | +6 | 75.00 |
| (Portugal) Benfica | 7 | 1 | 2 | 4 | 2 | 9 | −7 | 14.29 |
| (Portugal) Porto | 6 | 2 | 0 | 4 | 5 | 11 | −6 | 33.33 |
| (Portugal) Vitória de Guimarães | 4 | 1 | 1 | 2 | 2 | 6 | −4 | 25.00 |
| (Romania) Dinamo București | 4 | 1 | 1 | 2 | 7 | 7 | +0 | 25.00 |
| (Romania) Steaua București | 8 | 4 | 1 | 3 | 12 | 11 | +1 | 50.00 |
| (Russia) CSKA Moscow | 4 | 1 | 1 | 2 | 4 | 4 | +0 | 25.00 |
| (Russia) Spartak Moscow | 5 | 1 | 0 | 4 | 4 | 9 | −5 | 20.00 |
| (Scotland) Aberdeen | 4 | 2 | 1 | 1 | 6 | 5 | +1 | 50.00 |
| (Scotland) Celtic | 7 | 3 | 1 | 3 | 9 | 9 | +0 | 42.86 |
| (Scotland) Hibernian | 4 | 2 | 1 | 1 | 10 | 6 | +4 | 50.00 |
| (Serbia) Partizan | 4 | 1 | 0 | 3 | 6 | 7 | −1 | 25.00 |
| (Slovakia) Slovan Bratislava | 7 | 3 | 2 | 2 | 11 | 8 | +3 | 42.86 |
| (Slovakia) Žilina | 4 | 1 | 2 | 1 | 4 | 4 | +0 | 25.00 |
| (Slovenia) Domžale | 6 | 6 | 0 | 0 | 16 | 6 | +10 | 100.00 |
| (Slovenia) Koper | 6 | 2 | 1 | 3 | 13 | 11 | +2 | 33.33 |
| (Slovenia) Maribor | 4 | 3 | 1 | 0 | 6 | 3 | +3 | 75.00 |
| (Spain) Atlético Madrid | 6 | 0 | 1 | 5 | 2 | 10 | −8 | 0.00 |
| (Spain) Deportivo La Coruña | 4 | 0 | 1 | 3 | 0 | 6 | −6 | 0.00 |
| (Spain) Mallorca | 4 | 1 | 1 | 2 | 2 | 5 | −3 | 25.00 |
| (Spain) Real Betis | 4 | 1 | 3 | 0 | 3 | 2 | +1 | 25.00 |
| (Spain) Real Madrid | 4 | 1 | 0 | 3 | 5 | 11 | −6 | 25.00 |
| (Spain) Sevilla | 6 | 1 | 1 | 4 | 4 | 11 | −7 | 16.67 |
| (Spain) Valencia | 4 | 1 | 2 | 1 | 6 | 7 | −1 | 25.00 |
| (Spain) Villarreal | 6 | 1 | 0 | 5 | 5 | 12 | −7 | 16.67 |
| (Sweden) Elfsborg | 4 | 1 | 2 | 1 | 3 | 3 | +0 | 25.00 |
| (Sweden) Malmö FF | 7 | 4 | 1 | 2 | 12 | 12 | +0 | 57.14 |
| (Switzerland) Grasshopper | 4 | 1 | 3 | 0 | 10 | 5 | +5 | 25.00 |
| (Turkey) Trabzonspor | 4 | 2 | 1 | 1 | 5 | 4 | +1 | 50.00 |
| (Ukraine) Chornomorets | 4 | 1 | 1 | 2 | 4 | 4 | +0 | 25.00 |
| (Ukraine) Dnipro Dnipropetrovsk | 6 | 2 | 2 | 2 | 5 | 5 | +0 | 33.33 |
| (Ukraine) Dynamo Kyiv | 4 | 0 | 1 | 3 | 2 | 8 | −6 | 0.00 |
| (Ukraine) Shakhtar Donetsk | 4 | 0 | 2 | 2 | 6 | 10 | −4 | 0.00 |
| (Wales) Wrexham | 4 | 2 | 0 | 2 | 6 | 5 | +1 | 50.00 |
