= 1984 1. deild =

Coordinates: 62.0167°N 6.7667°W

Faroe Islands Premier League Football
- Season: 1984
- Champions: B68
- Relegated: B36
- Matches played: 56
- Goals scored: 177 (3.16 per match)
- Top goalscorer: Aksel Højgaard (B68, 10 goals); Erling Jacobsen (HB, 10 goals)
- Biggest home win: B68 3–0 B36; TB 3–0 GÍ
- Biggest away win: B36 1–7 KÍ
- Highest scoring: B36 1–7 KÍ

The 1984 1. deild was contested by 8 teams, and B68 Toftir won the championship.

== League standings ==
Pos	Team	Pld	W	D	L	GF	GA	GD	Pts
1	B68 Toftir	14	9	3	2	25	14	+11	21
2	TB Tvøroyri	14	8	3	3	26	15	+11	19
3	Havnar Bóltfelag	14	6	4	4	28	24	+4	16
4	Leirvík ÍF	14	4	5	5	19	18	+1	13
5	KÍ Klaksvík	14	2	7	5	27	27	0	11
6	GÍ Gøta	14	4	3	7	18	24	−6	11
7	NSÍ Runavík	14	2	7	5	19	27	−8	11
8	B36 Tórshavn	14	3	4	7	15	28	−13	10

== Results ==
The schedule consisted of a total of 14 games. Each team played two games against every opponent in no particular order. One of the games was at home and one was away.

Home \ Away	B36	B68	GÍG	HB	KÍ	LÍF	NSÍ	TB
B36 Tórshavn		1–4	2–0	1–1	1–7	1–0	1–1	1–2
B68 Toftir	3–0		3–2	2–1	1–1	1–0	1–1	2–1
GÍ Gøta	1–1	1–3		0–1	1–2	2–2	0–0	1–3
HB	2–2	2–2	1–3		2–2	1–4	4–2	1–0
KÍ	1–2	1–2	1–2	2–3		1–1	3–3	2–5
Leirvík ÍF	1–0	2–0	1–2	1–3	1–1		2–2	2–1
NSÍ Runavík	3–1	0–1	1–3	1–6	1–1	2–1		1–1
TB	2–1	1–0	3–0	2–0	2–2	1–1	2–1	

Source: www.faroesoccer.com
Legend: Blue = home team win; Yellow = draw; Red = away team win.

== Top goalscorers ==
Rank	Player	Club	Goals
1	(Faroe Islands) Aksel Højgaard	B68	10
1	(Faroe Islands) Erling Jacobsen	HB	10
3	(Faroe Islands) Trond Nolsøe	TB	9
4	(England) Martin Nugent	LÍF	6 (2)
5	(Faroe Islands) Ásmund Nolsøe	TB	5 (2)
5	(Faroe Islands) Jákup Mikkelsen	KÍ	6 (1)
7	(Faroe Islands) Beinir Poulsen	KÍ	6
7	(Faroe Islands) Símun Petur Justinussen	GÍ	4 (2)
