= Gunnar Nielsen (Argentine footballer) =

Argentine footballer

Personal information
- Full name: Gunnar Guillermo Nielsen
- Date of birth: 12 October 1983 (age 43)
- Place of birth: Posadas, Misiones, Argentina
- Height: 1.77 m (5 ft 10 in)
- Position: Midfielder

Team information
- Current team: Hillerød Fodbold

Youth career
- Guaraní Antonio Franco

Senior career*
Years	Team	Apps	(Gls)
2000	Guaraní Antonio Franco		
2000–2001	Cologna Veneta		
2002	Kolding FC		
2002–2005	AGF		
2005–2006	ÍF Fuglafjørður		
2006–2007	GÍ Gøta		
2007–2008	KÍ Klaksvík	25	(6)
2008–2009	FC Fredericia	20	(7)
2010–2011	Kolding FC	22	(5)
2011–2012	Kristianstads FF	10	(8)
2012	Östers IF		
2012–2014	IF Skjold Birkerød		
2014–	Hillerød Fodbold		
- * Club domestic league appearances and goals

Gunnar Guillermo Nielsen (Spanish pronunciation: [ɡunˈnaɾ ɣiˈʝeɾmo ˈnjelsen]; born 12 October 1983 in Posadas, Misiones) is an Argentine football player of Danish descent, currently playing for Hillerød GI. He previously represented FC Fredericia and Kolding FC.
