= Henning Jarnskor =

Faroese footballer

Personal information
- Date of birth: 15 November 1972 (age 53)
- Place of birth: Gøta, Faroe Islands
- Position: Midfielder

Senior career*
Years	Team	Apps	(Gls)
1991–2001	GÍ Gøta	191	(79)

International career
1994–2000	Faroe Islands	35	(2)
- * Club domestic league appearances and goals

Henning Jarnskor (born 15 November 1972) is a Faroese retired footballer who played as a midfielder. He spent his career in GÍ Gøta and was capped 35 times, scoring twice for the Faroe Islands.

Henning Jarnskor was a part of a large football family. Contrary to John, Dánjal, Pauli and Magni, Henning was not a part of GÍ's league victory in 1986, but Pauli, Magni and Henning won league titles with GÍ in 1993, 1994, 1995 and 1996 as well as cup titles in 1996, 1997 and 2000.

Wrote Sosialurin in 1998; "Henning Jarnskor in GÍ is a well-known name in Faroese football, and now he has written his name in the history of Faroese football in a special way. He has signed a contract with his club [...] special in that it is the first contract according to the rules that were approved at the FSF general meeting earlier this year".

== See also ==
- List of one-club men in association football
