= FC Hoyvík =

Association football club in Faroe Islands

- Full name: FC Hoyvík
- Founded: 12 January 1975
- Dissolved: 2012 (merged with FFC Giza) (Formerly Owned By Rafi Baydoun)
- Ground: Gundadalur's lower field
| Home colours | Away colours |

Club logo when it was known as Fram Tórshavn.

FC Hoyvík was a Faroese football club, which merged with FF Giza in 2012. The new club was called Giza Hoyvík and later changed its name to FC Hoyvík. This incarnation of FC Hoyvík was previously named ÍF Fram Tórshavn (Tórshavn Forward) and was located in the Hoyvík district, a suburb of the capital Tórshavn, Faroe Islands.

== History ==
The club was founded on 12 January 1975 as IF Fram Tórshavn, and became the third football club in Tórshavn. HB Tórshavn (1904) and B36 Tórshavn (1936) are the first two. The fourth club in Torshavn came in 1997, Argja Bóltfelag from Argir. As the suburb Argir was incorporated in 1997 in the Municipality of Tórshavn. They were founded 1973.

In 1977, Fram Tórshavn played their first season in 1. deild (now named Effodeildin), but only finished seventh in the league and were relegated that season. Fram have never managed to achieve promotion back into the top flight league since. They are the only Faroese football club in history to have played in first league, down to the fourth league. In late 2008, the club changed its name to FC Hoyvík. In 2009, FC Hoyvík played their first season under the new name in the 1.Deild of the FSF (second division), after Fram Torshavn won the 2.Deild in the previous season and were promoted to 1. deild. They ended as 7th of 10 teams with 34 points. They got the same result in 2010 with 33 points. In 2011, they ended as number 9 with 26 points and got relegated to 2. deild. FC Hoyvík also had a team in 2. deild that year, and this team got relegated to 3. deild. After the 2011 season, FC Hoyvík and FF Giza (earlier Nólsoyar Ítróttarfelag), which played in the fourth leg (3. deild) decided to join forces and merged into Giza/Hoyvík. In 2012, their team ended as number three in 2. deild with 40 points. TB Tvøroyri II got promoted to 1. deild with 40 points, they had better goal score. B36 Tórshavn II won 2. deild and got promoted together with TB Tvøroyri II.

== Current squad ==
As of 2 April 2024

Note: Flags indicate national team as defined under FIFA eligibility rules; some limited exceptions apply. Players may hold more than one non-FIFA nationality.

| No. | Pos. | Nation | Player |
|---|---|---|---|
| 1 | GK | (Denmark) DEN | Nicolai Vistisen |
| 2 | MF | (Faroe Islands) FRO | Sigurd Rasmussen |
| 3 | DF | (Faroe Islands) FRO | Frídi Magnussen |
| 4 | DF | (Faroe Islands) FRO | Jónas Bech |
| 5 | DF | (Faroe Islands) FRO | John í Innistovu |
| 6 | MF | (Faroe Islands) FRO | Ólavvur Venned |
| 7 | MF | (Faroe Islands) FRO | Rói Jacobsen |
| 8 | MF | (Faroe Islands) FRO | Sjúrdur Jensen |
| 9 | FW | (Senegal) SEN | Ahmed Keita |
| 10 | MF | (Faroe Islands) FRO | Fródi Rasmussen |
| 11 | FW | (Faroe Islands) FRO | Gilli Samuelsen |
| 12 | DF | (Faroe Islands) FRO | Pætur McLeod Jacobsen |
| 13 | DF | (Faroe Islands) FRO | Manni Mortansson |

| No. | Pos. | Nation | Player |
|---|---|---|---|
| 14 | DF | (Faroe Islands) FRO | Vernar Olsen |
| 15 | DF | (Faroe Islands) FRO | Jogvan Vitalis |
| 16 | GK | (Faroe Islands) FRO | Heini Hentze |
| 17 | FW | (Faroe Islands) FRO | Andreas Skeel Nolsøe |
| 18 | DF | (Faroe Islands) FRO | Páll Frídi Ziskason |
| 19 | MF | (Faroe Islands) FRO | Ásmund Hansen |
| 20 | MF | (Faroe Islands) FRO | Rói av Fløtum |
| 21 | DF | (Faroe Islands) FRO | Sverri Hansson |
| 22 | GK | (Faroe Islands) FRO | Petur Petersen |
| 23 | DF | (Faroe Islands) FRO | Bárdur Guttesen |
| 26 | DF | (Faroe Islands) FRO | Ragnar Rasmussen |
| — | MF | (Faroe Islands) FRO | Hedin Olsen |
| — | FW | (Faroe Islands) FRO | Petur Frank Holm |

== Honours ==
- 1. deild
  - Champions (1): 1976
- 2. deild
  - Champions (2): 1989, 2008
