= SÍ Sumba =

Faroese football club (1940–2005)

- Full name: Sumbiar Ítróttarfelag
- Founded: 21 May 1940
- Dissolved: 2005
- Ground: á Krossinum, Sumba
Home colours	Away colours

Sumbiar Ítróttarfelag, commonly known as Sumba, was a Faroese football club based in Sumba. In 2005 it merged with VB Vágur to form VB/Sumba, later renamed FC Suðuroy.

== History ==
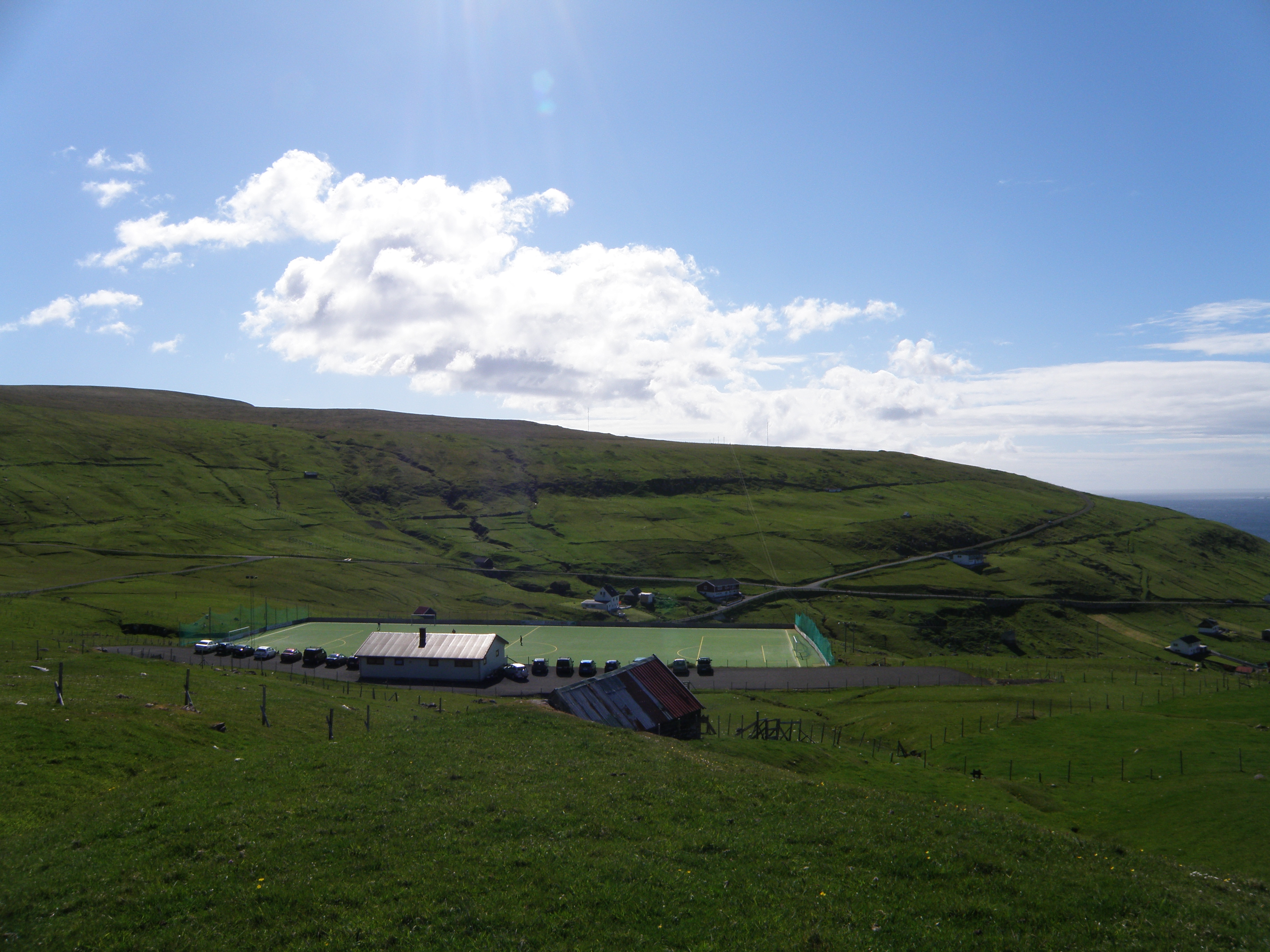
Distant view of á Krossinum, Sumba's football field.

Founded in 1940, the club spent the majority of its existence in the lower tiers of Faroese football, winning the 2. deild in 1982 and the 1. deild in 1997. In 1995 the club merged with VB Vágur for the first time, forming Sumba/VB, but the merger lasted only one season.

In 2005 the club merged again with VB Vágur, this time to form VB/Sumba, which was renamed in 2010 to FC Suðuroy.

== Honours ==
- 1. deild
  - Champions: 1997
  - Runners-up: 1990
- 2. deild
  - Champions: 1982
