= Gøtu Ítróttarfelag =

Former association football club in Faroe Islands

GÍ
- Full name: Gøtu Ítróttarfelag
- Short name: GÍ
- Founded: 1926
- Dissolved: 2008
- Ground: Serpugerdi Stadium; Gøta, Faroes
- Capacity: 2,000
- Chairman: Janus Rasmussen
- League: Formuladeildin
- 2007: 5th
Home colours	Away colours

Gøtu Ítróttarfelag, commonly known as just GÍ, was a football club based in Gøta, in the Faroe Islands.

== History ==
It was founded in 1926. The club colours were yellow and blue. They played at the Serpugerdi Stadium and won 6 league titles. In January 2008 the club merged with Leirvík ÍF, forming the new club Víkingur.

== Achievements ==
- Faroe Islands Premier League Football: 6
  - 1983, 1986, 1993, 1994, 1995, 1996
- Faroe Islands Cup: 6
  - 1983, 1985, 1996, 1997, 2000, 2005

== UEFA club competition record ==
Competition	Matches	W	D	L	GF	GA
UEFA Champions League	2	0	0	2	0	11
UEFA Cup	14	0	2	12	8	32
UEFA Cup Winners' Cup	2	0	0	2	1	10
UEFA Intertoto Cup	4	1	0	3	2	8
Total	22	1	2	19	11	61

=== Matches ===
Season	Competition	Round	Opponent	Home	Away	Aggregate
1994–95	UEFA Cup	PR	(Sweden) Trelleborg	0–1	2–3	2–4
1995–96	UEFA Cup	PR	(Scotland) Raith Rovers	2–2	0–4	2–6
1996–97	UEFA Cup	PR	(Finland) FC Jazz	0–1	1–3	1–4
1997–98	UEFA Champions League	1Q	(Scotland) Rangers	0–5	0–6	0–11
1998–99	UEFA Cup Winners' Cup	1Q	(Hungary) MTK Budapest	1–3	0–7	1–10
1999	UEFA Intertoto Cup	1Q	(Bosnia and Herzegovina) Jedinstvo Bihać	1–0	0–3	1–3
2000–01	UEFA Cup	1Q	(Sweden) Norrköping	0–2	1–2	1–4
2001–02	UEFA Cup	1Q	(Federal Republic of Yugoslavia) FK Obilić	1–1	0–4	1–5
2002–03	UEFA Cup	1Q	(Croatia) Hajduk Split	0–8	0–3	0–11
2003	UEFA Intertoto Cup	1Q	(Moldova) Dacia Chişinău	0–1	1–4	1–5
2006–07	UEFA Cup	1Q	(Latvia) Ventspils	0–2	1–2	1–4

== Historical list of managers ==
- (Faroe Islands) Johan Nielsen (1992)
- (Faroe Islands) Simun Peter Justinussen (1993–94)
- (Faroe Islands) Johan Nielsen (1995)
- (Iceland) Páll Guðlaugsson (1996–97)
- (Faroe Islands) Johan Nielsen (1998–02)
- (Poland) Krzysztof Popczyński (2002–05)
- (Faroe Islands) Petur Mohr (2 Oct 2005–07)
