= LÍF Leirvík =

Former association football club in Faroe Islands

LÍF
- Full name: Leirvíkar Ítróttarfelag
- Nickname(s): LÍF
- Founded: 1 December 1928
- Dissolved: 2008
- Ground: Uppi á Brekku
- Capacity: 2,000
- League: 1. deild
- 2007: 5th
Home colours	Away colours

Leirvíkar Ítróttarfelag, commonly known as LÍF or LÍF Leirvík, was a Faroese football club based in Leirvík. The club was founded in 1928. They merged with GÍ Gøta in 2008 to form Víkingur, in the year of team's 80th anniversary.

From 1982 to 1989, and for one final time in 1993, LÍF played in the country's top division, with the best finish being 4th place in 1984 and 1985. In 1986, they lost their only ever Faroe Islands Cup final by 2–1 to NSÍ Runavík.

== Honours ==
- 1. deild: 2 (1981, 1992)
- 2. deild: 1 (1980)
- Faroe Islands Cup: Runners-up (1986)
