= 2002 1. deild =

Coordinates: 62.0167°N 6.7667°W

Faroe Islands Premier League Football
- Season: 2002
- Champions: HB
- Relegated: TB
- Matches played: 90
- Goals scored: 329 (3.66 per match)
- Biggest home win: Skála 8–0 TB
- Biggest away win: TB 2–8 B36
- Highest scoring: HB 9–3 TB

Statistics of 1. deild in the 2002 season.

== Overview ==
It was contested by 10 teams, and Havnar Bóltfelag won the championship.

== League standings ==
Pos	Team	Pld	W	D	L	GF	GA	GD	Pts
1	Havnar Bóltfelag	18	13	2	3	52	19	+33	41
2	NSÍ Runavík	18	11	3	4	38	21	+17	36
3	KÍ Klaksvík	18	10	3	5	45	25	+20	33
4	GÍ Gøta	18	10	2	6	33	30	+3	32
5	B36 Tórshavn	18	9	5	4	55	27	+28	32
6	B68 Toftir	18	7	5	6	28	28	0	26
7	VB Vágur	18	6	4	8	18	24	−6	22
8	Skála ÍF	18	3	4	11	23	41	−18	13
9	EB/Streymur	18	3	3	12	19	42	−23	12
10	TB Tvøroyri	18	1	3	14	18	72	−54	6

Rules for classification: 1st points, 2nd head-to-head, 3rd goals average

== Results ==
The schedule consisted of a total of 18 games. Each team played two games against every opponent in no particular order. One of the games was at home and one was away.

Home \ Away	B36	B68	EBS	GÍG	HB	KÍ	NSÍ	SKÁ	TB	VBV
B36 Tórshavn		4–0	7–2	2–3	1–2	3–3	1–3	6–0	2–1	6–0
B68 Toftir	1–4		2–1	1–1	1–1	2–0	1–1	2–3	0–0	4–0
EB/Streymur	1–1	3–3		1–2	2–1	0–4	1–2	1–0	4–0	0–1
GÍ Gøta	2–2	2–0	3–0		3–4	1–3	0–2	2–1	2–0	2–1
HB	1–2	3–1	2–0	3–0		4–1	4–0	5–0	9–3	3–0
KÍ	2–3	1–0	3–1	5–1	3–2		2–3	4–0	7–0	0–0
NSÍ Runavík	1–1	1–2	4–0	3–2	0–2	0–1		3–1	5–1	1–0
Skála ÍF	1–1	1–2	3–1	1–2	0–3	2–2	0–4		8–0	0–1
TB	2–8	1–4	1–1	0–3	2–3	1–3	2–5	2–2		1–0
VB Vágur	2–1	1–2	3–0	1–2	0–0	2–1	0–0	0–0	6–1	

Source: www.faroesoccer.com
Legend: Blue = home team win; Yellow = draw; Red = away team win.

== Top goalscorers ==
Source: faroesoccer.com

18 goals

- (Faroe Islands) Andrew av Fløtum (HB)

15 goals

- (Faroe Islands) John Petersen (B36)

12 goals

- (Faroe Islands) Jón Rói Jacobsen (HB)

11 goals

- (Faroe Islands) Hjalgrím Elttør (KÍ)
- (Faroe Islands) Øssur Hansen (B68)

9 goals

- (Faroe Islands) Sámal Joensen (GÍ)

8 goals

- (Faroe Islands) Heðin á Lakjuni (KÍ)
- (Faroe Islands) Kurt Mørkøre (KÍ)
