= 2006 Faroe Islands Premier League =

Faroe Islands Premier League
- Season: 2006
- Champions: HB
- Relegated: B68 Toftir; ÍF
- Champions League: HB
- UEFA Cup: EB/Streymur; B36 Tórshavn
- Intertoto Cup: KÍ
- Matches played: 135
- Goals scored: 432 (3.2 per match)
- Top goalscorer: Christian Høgni Jacobsen (18 goals)

Faroe Islands Premier League Football in the 2006 season.

EB/Streymur were top of the league throughout most of the season, with HB Tórshavn, B36 Tórshavn and NSÍ Runavík staying in contention. With 4 matches left to play, EB/Streymur were 7 points ahead of second placed HB, but after 1 draw and 1 loss for EB/Streymur, HB managed to reduce that lead by 2 points by winning twice. By this time B36, KÍ and NSÍ were out of the title race. With one match left to play, HB Tórshavn's only chance of securing the title was if EB/Streymur lost to KÍ Klaksvík. In addition to that, HB had to win their match against ÍF. But as both matches were locked in stalemates and time was ebbing out, EB/Streymur were on the way to winning the title. But then, 82 minutes into the match between EB/Streymur and KÍ, events took a dramatic twist, as Paul Clapson put KÍ 1–0 up against EB/Streymur with a long range effort. But EB/Streymur were still champions at this stage, because HB didn't seem to be able to capitalize on the golden opportunity given by EB/Streymur and KÍ.

88 minutes had gone in the match between HB and ÍF, and still HB hadn't scored the crucial goal that would hand them the title. But in a last desperate effort, HB's central defender Vagnur Mohr Mortensen joined the attack. A long high ball was sent into ÍF's penalty area on the left where Vagnur headed the ball over a stranded goalkeeper and into the goal for a 1–0 lead and, more importantly, secured HB the 2006 championship title. Deep into stoppage time, Rógvi Jacobsen added another and HB won 2–0.

== League table ==
Pos	Team	Pld	W	D	L	GF	GA	GD	Pts	Qualification or relegation
1	HB (C)	27	16	7	4	61	36	+25	55	Qualification for the Champions League first qualifying round
2	EB/Streymur	27	16	6	5	63	30	+33	54	Qualification for the UEFA Cup first qualifying round
3	B36 Tórshavn	27	13	8	6	45	32	+13	47	Qualification for the UEFA Cup first qualifying round
4	KÍ	27	12	9	6	54	39	+15	45	Qualification for the Intertoto Cup first round
5	NSÍ Runavík	27	12	6	9	50	39	+11	42	
6	GÍ Gøta	27	10	11	6	39	34	+5	41	
7	Skála IF	27	7	10	10	33	29	+4	31	
8	VB Vágur	27	5	5	17	24	73	−49	20	
9	B68 Toftir (R)	27	4	6	17	34	58	−24	18	Relegation to 1. deild
10	ÍF (R)	27	4	4	19	29	62	−33	16	Relegation to 1. deild

Rules for classification: 1st points, 2nd head-to-head, 3rd goals average
(C) Champions; (R) Relegated

== Results ==
The schedule consists of a total of 27 games. Each team plays three games against every opponent in no particular order. At least one of the games will be at home and one will be away. The additional home game for every match-up is randomly assigned prior to the season.

=== Regular home games ===
Home \ Away	B36	B68	EBS	GÍG	HB	ÍF	KÍ	NSÍ	SKÁ	VBS
B36 Tórshavn		2–1	2–2	0–0	6–0	4–1	1–1	1–1	0–1	2–2
B68 Toftir	0–1		2–8	1–1	1–2	1–1	0–4	1–5	1–0	1–1
EB/Streymur	2–1	2–1		2–1	2–2	2–0	1–1	2–3	2–0	4–0
GÍ Gøta	1–1	1–0	0–2		3–2	3–1	1–4	1–1	0–0	3–0
Havnar Bóltfelag	2–0	3–2	2–3	1–2		5–1	3–3	4–0	1–0	4–1
ÍF Fuglafjørður	1–3	3–0	0–2	1–1	1–3		2–3	0–3	0–2	1–2
KÍ Klaksvík	0–1	1–3	1–4	1–1	2–2	0–0		1–1	2–2	3–0
NSÍ Runavík	1–2	6–1	2–0	1–1	1–2	1–1	0–1		2–1	2–1
Skála ÍF	0–1	1–0	1–1	1–2	1–1	1–2	1–2	0–2		5–0
VB/Sumba	1–2	3–2	0–5	0–2	1–1	2–1	1–7	2–5	0–4	

Source: EU-football.info
Legend: Blue = home team win; Yellow = draw; Red = away team win.

=== Additional home games ===
Home \ Away	B36	B68	EBS	GÍG	HB	ÍF	KÍ	NSÍ	SKÁ	VBS
B36 Tórshavn		3–1	2–1				1–5		2–2	
B68 Toftir			1–1		0–1		2–3		2–4	6–1
EB/Streymur				2–3	1–1		0–1	4–1	2–0	
GÍ Gøta	1–2	1–1			1–4				0–0	
Havnar Bóltfelag	2–1					2–0	5–1		1–1	2–0
ÍF Fuglafjørður	2–1	2–3	1–2	1–3				1–3		
KÍ Klaksvík				1–4		3–0		2–1		0–1
NSÍ Runavík	1–1			4–2	1–3	2–0				
Skála ÍF						1–1	1–1	2–0		1–1
VB/Sumba	0–2		1–4	0–0		1–4		2–0		

Source: EU-football.info
Legend: Blue = home team win; Yellow = draw; Red = away team win.

== Top goalscorers ==
18 goals

- (Faroe Islands) Christian Høgni Jacobsen (NSI)

15 goals

- (Faroe Islands) Súni Fríði Barbá (B68)

12 goals

- (England) Paul Clapson (KI)
- (Faroe Islands) Rókur Jespersen (HB)
- (France) Amed Davy Sylla (B36)

11 goals

- (Faroe Islands) Arnbjørn Hansen (EB/Steymur)
- (Denmark) Christian Lundberg (KI)
- (Faroe Islands) Oli Hansen (NSI)
- (Romania) Sorin Anghel (EB/Streymur)

10 goals

- (Faroe Islands) Hans Pauli Samuelsen (EB/Streymur)
- (Faroe Islands) Jákup á Borg (HB)
- (Faroe Islands) Páll Mohr Joensen (HB)
