= 1994 1. deild =

Coordinates: 62.0167°N 6.7667°W

Faroe Islands Premier League Football
- Season: 1994
- Champions: GÍ
- Relegated: EB/Streymur
- Matches played: 90
- Goals scored: 315 (3.5 per match)
- Biggest home win: GÍ 9–0 EB/Streymur
- Biggest away win: B68 0–7 GÍ
- Highest scoring: KÍ 8–2 EB/Streymur

Statistics of 1. deild in the 1994 season.

== Overview ==
It was contested by 10 teams, and GÍ Gøta won the championship.

== League standings ==
Pos	Team	Pld	W	D	L	GF	GA	GD	Pts
1	GÍ Gøta	18	14	2	2	59	16	+43	30
2	Havnar Bóltfelag	18	14	2	2	47	14	+33	30
3	B71 Sandur	18	10	4	4	31	12	+19	24
4	KÍ Klaksvík	18	8	4	6	40	26	+14	20
5	B68 Toftir	18	5	7	6	22	30	−8	17
6	NSÍ Runavík	18	6	3	9	28	29	−1	15
7	B36 Tórshavn	18	5	5	8	24	34	−10	15
8	TB Tvøroyri	18	6	2	10	32	49	−17	14
9	ÍF Fuglafjørður	18	3	2	13	17	44	−27	8
10	EB/Streymur	18	2	3	13	15	61	−46	7

== Results ==
The schedule consisted of a total of 18 games. Each team played two games against every opponent in no particular order. One of the games was at home and one was away.

Home \ Away	B36	B68	B71	EBS	GÍG	HB	ÍF	KÍ	NSÍ	TB
B36 Tórshavn		2–3	0–2	3–1	2–5	1–3	3–1	0–4	2–0	6–0
B68 Toftir	0–0		0–0	4–1	0–7	2–2	1–0	3–0	3–2	1–1
B71 Sandoy	0–0	2–0		5–1	1–2	1–2	3–0	2–0	1–0	4–1
EB/Streymur	1–1	0–0	0–3		0–1	0–3	0–0	2–2	2–1	0–5
GÍ Gøta	2–0	1–1	1–1	9–0		4–1	8–0	0–2	2–1	4–1
HB	5–0	0–0	1–0	4–0	1–0		1–0	2–1	3–0	7–0
ÍF	2–2	1–0	1–1	4–2	0–2	1–7		1–2	3–1	1–2
KÍ	1–1	6–3	0–2	8–2	1–1	0–2	2–0		2–2	2–1
NSÍ Runavík	3–0	0–0	0–1	4–2	0–1	4–1	3–1	2–1		2–2
TB	1–2	1–0	3–2	1–4	3–5	0–2	5–1	0–6	2–3	

Source: www.faroesoccer.com
Legend: Blue = home team win; Yellow = draw; Red = away team win.

== Top goalscorers ==
Source: faroesoccer.com

21 goals

- (Faroe Islands) John Petersen (GÍ)

14 goals

- (Faroe Islands) Gunnar Mohr (HB)

12 goals

- (Faroe Islands) Eyðun Klakstein (KÍ)

10 goals

- (Faroe Islands) Allan Mørkøre (KÍ)

9 goals

- (Faroe Islands) Bogi Johannesen (TB)
- (Faroe Islands) Kurt Mørkøre (KÍ)

8 goals

- (Faroe Islands) Djóni Joensen (NSÍ)
- (Faroe Islands) Sámal Joensen (GÍ)
