= 1997 1. deild =

Coordinates: 62.0167°N 6.7667°W

Faroe Islands Premier League Football
- Season: 1997
- Champions: B36
- Relegated: B71
- Matches played: 90
- Goals scored: 349 (3.88 per match)
- Biggest home win: GÍ 7–1 B71; KÍ 6–0 FS Vágar
- Biggest away win: B71 0–9 HB
- Highest scoring: B36 8–3 ÍF

Statistics of 1. deild in the 1997 season.

== Overview ==
It was contested by 10 teams, and B36 Tórshavn won the championship.

== League standings ==
Pos	Team	Pld	W	D	L	GF	GA	GD	Pts
1	B36 Tórshavn	18	16	0	2	58	24	+34	48
2	Havnar Bóltfelag	18	12	5	1	61	19	+42	41
3	GÍ Gøta	18	10	5	3	46	25	+21	35
4	VB Vágur	18	11	2	5	32	18	+14	35
5	KÍ Klaksvík	18	8	2	8	48	31	+17	26
6	NSÍ Runavík	18	6	4	8	26	33	−7	22
7	ÍF Fuglafjørður	18	5	2	11	27	50	−23	17
8	B68 Toftir	18	4	3	11	23	40	−17	15
9	FS Vágar	18	2	3	13	16	53	−37	9
10	B71 Sandur	18	1	4	13	12	56	−44	7

== Results ==
The schedule consisted of a total of 18 games. Each team played two games against every opponent in no particular order. One of the games was at home and one was away.

Home \ Away	B36	B68	B71	FSV	GÍG	HB	ÍF	KÍ	NSÍ	VBV
B36 Tórshavn		2–1	6–1	4–2	5–2	2–3	8–3	2–1	3–2	4–0
B68 Toftir	0–3		0–0	5–1	1–4	2–5	1–3	1–2	0–2	0–1
B71 Sandoy	3–6	1–2		1–0	0–1	0–9	1–2	0–5	1–1	0–2
FS Vágar	0–1	1–2	0–0		0–4	0–7	4–2	1–1	1–3	1–0
GÍ Gøta	0–2	1–1	7–1	2–2		1–1	3–1	4–2	2–0	4–1
HB	1–0	6–1	5–0	6–2	2–0		3–3	3–0	2–2	1–2
ÍF	1–2	1–3	0–0	3–0	0–4	2–3		1–9	0–2	0–3
KÍ	2–4	2–2	5–2	6–0	4–5	0–2	0–1		4–0	3–2
NSÍ Runavík	1–2	2–1	3–1	2–0	2–2	1–1	2–4	0–2		1–4
VB Vágur	1–2	3–0	2–0	4–1	0–0	1–1	2–0	1–0	3–0	

Source: www.faroesoccer.com
Legend: Blue = home team win; Yellow = draw; Red = away team win.

== Top goalscorers ==
Source: faroesoccer.com

24 goals

- (Faroe Islands) Uni Arge (HB)

16 goals

- (Faroe Islands) Henning Jarnskor (GÍ)
- (Faroe Islands) John Petersen (B36)

12 goals

- (Faroe Islands) Kurt Mørkøre (KÍ)

10 goals

- (Faroe Islands) Pól Thorsteinsson (VB)

9 goals

- (Faroe Islands) Heðin á Lakjuni (KÍ)

8 goals

- (Faroe Islands) Gunnar Mohr (HB)
- (Faroe Islands) Jens Kristian Hansen (B36)
- (Faroe Islands) Julian Johnsson (B36)
- (Faroe Islands) Óli Johannesen (B36)
- (Faroe Islands) Óli Hansen (NSÍ)
