= 1995 1. deild =

Coordinates: 62.0167°N 6.7667°W

Faroe Islands Premier League Football
- Season: 1995
- Champions: GÍ
- Relegated: NSÍ
- Matches played: 90
- Goals scored: 299 (3.32 per match)
- Biggest home win: B36 6–0 TB
- Biggest away win: B36 0–5 HB; KÍ 1–6 GÍ; NSÍ Runavík 0–5 B68
- Highest scoring: FS Vágar 3–5 HB; FS Vágar 5–3 KÍ Klaksvík; Sumba/VB 2–6 B71

Statistics of 1. deild in the 1995 season.

== Overview ==
It was contested by 10 teams, and GÍ Gøta won the championship.

== League standings ==
Pos	Team	Pld	W	D	L	GF	GA	GD	Pts
1	GÍ Gøta	18	13	2	3	41	16	+25	41
2	Havnar Bóltfelag	18	9	6	3	34	14	+20	33
3	B68 Toftir	18	9	3	6	43	21	+22	30
4	B71 Sandur	18	9	2	7	35	27	+8	29
5	B36 Tórshavn	18	8	2	8	23	35	−12	26
6	FS Vágar	18	6	5	7	30	38	−8	23
7	TB Tvøroyri	18	6	4	8	23	29	−6	22
8	KÍ Klaksvík	18	6	4	8	31	43	−12	22
9	Sumba/VB	18	6	2	10	26	39	−13	20
10	NSÍ Runavík	18	2	2	14	13	37	−24	8

== Results ==
The schedule consisted of a total of 18 games. Each team played two games against every opponent in no particular order. One of the games was at home and one was away.

Home \ Away	B36	B68	B71	FSV	GÍG	HB	KÍ	NSÍ	SVB	TB
B36 Tórshavn		0–4	3–1	3–2	0–2	0–5	2–1	1–0	1–2	6–0
B68 Toftir	2–0		1–1	5–0	1–1	1–2	2–1	4–1	3–0	1–2
B71 Sandoy	1–2	2–1		2–0	2–3	2–0	1–4	2–1	5–1	2–1
FS Vágar	1–1	1–5	1–1		3–2	3–5	5–3	2–0	2–4	3–1
GÍ Gøta	2–0	0–2	3–2	2–1		1–3	5–1	5–1	3–0	2–0
HB	5–1	3–1	1–0	0–0	0–0		5–0	0–0	2–0	4–1
KÍ	2–2	4–3	1–3	0–0	1–6	2–0		2–1	1–2	2–2
NSÍ Runavík	1–2	0–5	0–2	1–2	0–1	0–0	0–4		0–3	2–3
Sumba/VB	1–2	2–1	2–6	2–2	0–2	1–1	1–2	1–3		4–1
TB	3–2	1–1	2–0	1–2	1–0	0–0	2–2	0–1	2–0	

Source: www.faroesoccer.com
Legend: Blue = home team win; Yellow = draw; Red = away team win.

== Top goalscorers ==
Source: faroesoccer.com

24 goals

- (Faroe Islands) Súni Fríði Barbá (B68)

11 goals

- (Faroe Islands) Jan Allan Müller (Sumba/VB)

10 goals

- (Faroe Islands) Kurt Mørkøre (B68)
- (Faroe Islands) Eli Hentze (B71)
- (Faroe Islands) Magni Jarnskor (GÍ)

9 goals

- (Faroe Islands) Torbjørn Jensen (B71)

8 goals

- (Faroe Islands) Sigfríður Clementsen (HB)
- (Faroe Islands) Uni Arge (HB)
- (Faroe Islands) Olgar Danielsen (KÍ)
