= 2000 1. deild =

Coordinates: 62.0167°N 6.7667°W

Faroe Islands Premier League Football
- Season: 2000
- Champions: VB
- Relegated: Sumba
- Matches played: 90
- Goals scored: 361 (4.01 per match)
- Biggest home win: B36 11–1 Sumba
- Biggest away win: Sumba 0–6 NSÍ
- Highest scoring: B36 11–1 Sumba

In 2000, 1. deild was the top tier league in Faroe Islands football (since 2005, the top tier has been the Faroe Islands Premier League, with 1. deild becoming the second tier).

This article details the statistics of Faroe Islands Premier League Football in the 2000 season.

== Overview ==
It was contested by 10 teams, and VB Vágur won the championship.

== League standings ==
Pos	Team	Pld	W	D	L	GF	GA	GD	Pts
1	VB Vágur	18	12	4	2	40	22	+18	40
2	Havnar Bóltfelag	18	11	5	2	40	21	+19	38
3	B68 Toftir	18	10	1	7	43	38	+5	31
4	NSÍ Runavík	18	9	3	6	43	29	+14	30
5	KÍ Klaksvík	18	9	3	6	42	28	+14	30
6	B36 Tórshavn	18	9	1	8	49	27	+22	28
7	GÍ Gøta	18	8	2	8	41	38	+3	26
8	B71 Sandur	18	4	2	12	25	33	−8	14
9	FS Vágar	18	3	2	13	22	54	−32	11
10	Sumba ÍF	18	3	1	14	16	71	−55	10

== Results ==
The schedule consisted of a total of 18 games. Each team played two games against every opponent in no particular order. One of the games was at home and one was away.

Home \ Away	B36	B68	B71	FSV	GÍG	HB	KÍ	NSÍ	SUM	VBV
B36 Tórshavn		1–2	2–4	6–1	3–1	1–3	1–2	5–0	11–1	1–2
B68 Toftir	1–3		3–1	2–0	3–7	1–1	6–1	2–0	5–1	1–2
B71 Sandoy	1–2	2–3		3–0	2–2	0–1	0–4	1–2	3–0	1–2
FS Vágar	1–3	3–2	2–1		1–5	0–2	4–5	3–3	0–2	2–2
GÍ Gøta	1–0	1–2	5–3	5–1		1–2	0–0	1–0	2–0	2–3
HB	2–2	1–1	1–0	4–1	5–0		3–4	2–5	5–1	2–2
KÍ	2–1	4–1	2–1	4–1	2–1	1–2		0–1	9–0	2–1
NSÍ Runavík	2–3	3–0	1–1	3–1	3–4	0–2	2–1		6–1	4–0
Sumbiar ítróttarfelag	0–4	1–4	1–0	1–0	2–5	1–3	3–3	0–6		1–2
VB Vágur	1–0	4–1	0–1	6–0	5–3	0–0	1–0	3–1	3–0	

Source: www.faroesoccer.com
Legend: Blue = home team win; Yellow = draw; Red = away team win.

== Top goalscorers ==
Source: faroesoccer.com

16 goals

- (Faroe Islands) Súni Fríði Barbá (B68)

15 goals

- (Brazil) Marcello Marcelino (B68)

14 goals

- (Poland) Krzysztof Popczyński (VB)

13 goals

- (Faroe Islands) Súni Olsen (GÍ)

11 goals

- (Faroe Islands) Andrew av Fløtum (HB)
- (Faroe Islands) Dánial Hansen (NSÍ)

10 goals

- (Faroe Islands) Ove Nysted (KÍ)

9 goals

- (Faroe Islands) Christian Høgni Jacobsen (NSÍ)
- (Poland) Robert Cieślewicz (VB)
