= 1954 Meistaradeildin =

Faroese football league season

Meistaradeildin
- Season: 1954
- Champions: KÍ Klaksvík (4th title)
- Matches played: 12
- Goals scored: 36 (3 per match)

1954 Meistaradeildin was the twelfth season of Meistaradeildin, the top tier of the Faroese football league system. The championship was contested in a league format, with four teams playing against each other twice. KÍ Klaksvík won its fourth league title in the season.

== Teams ==
Location of teams in the 1954 Meistaradeildin

Since there was no second-tier league, all the teams that participated in the 1953 Meistaradeildin could participate in the league. Two teams from Tórshavn, HB and B36, KI from Klaksvík and TB from Tvøroyri contested in the league.

== League table ==
Pos	Team	Pld	W	D	L	GF	GA	GD	Pts
1	KÍ Klaksvík (C)	6	5	1	0	12	5	+7	11
2	HB Tórshavn	6	3	1	2	13	6	+7	7
3	B36 Tórshavn	6	1	1	4	8	13	−5	3
4	TB Tvøroyri	6	1	1	4	3	12	−9	3

Updated to match(es) played on unknown. Source:
(C) Champions

== Results ==
Home \ Away	B36	HB	KÍ	TB
B36 Tórshavn		1–1	2–4	3–0
HB	3–1		0–2	4–0
KÍ	3–1	2–1		– (Note: Since TB Tvøroyri did not appear for the game, the match was rated 4–2 for KÍ Klaksvík, KÍ's highest win of the season.)
TB	2–0	0–4	1–1	

Source: rsssf.com
Legend: Blue = home team win; Yellow = draw; Red = away team win.
