= 2005 Faroe Islands Premier League =

Football season in the Faroe Islands

Faroe Islands Premier League
- Season: 2005
- Champions: B36
- Relegated: TB
- Champions League: B36
- UEFA Cup: Skála ÍF; GÍ Gøta
- Intertoto Cup: HB
- Matches played: 135
- Goals scored: 434 (3.21 per match)
- Top goalscorer: Christian Høgni Jacobsen (18 goals)
- Biggest home win: HB 9–0 ÍF
- Biggest away win: VB/Sumba 1–5 Skála; GÍ 1–5 EB/Streymur; GÍ 1–5 NSÍ
- Highest scoring: KÍ Klaksvík 5–6 NSÍ

The Faroe Islands Premier League 2005 season was the 63rd season of league football in the Faroe Islands.

Because of a sponsorship deal with IT company Formula, the league was renamed Formuladeildin (Formula Division).

The season was close throughout at the top of league, with HB, B36 and Skála each vying for a place at the top of league. This continued until the end of the season and there was a close finish. HB beat KÍ 2–1 to set up a last day finale against B36. If HB won, they would become champions. If B36 won, they would become champions. If the match finished in a draw, then Skála would become champions if they beat GÍ Gøta at home. In the decisive match, HB took the lead just before half-time. But after the break HB threw away their lead 20 minutes into the second half after a defensive mistake and Allan Mørkøre equalized for B36. Meanwhile, Skála ÍF were 1–0 up against GÍ Gøta. With the scores as they were Skála would become champions. But eight minutes later in the HB v B36 match, B36 had another chance and Fróði Benjaminsen scored to make it 2–1 to B36. HB couldn't make a comeback and B36 won the match. Therefore, HB's 3-year reign as Faroese champions had ended and B36 Tórshavn won the league, HB Tórshavn finished in third place. Skála ÍF drew with GÍ Gøta and finished second, GÍ avoided relegation by a last gasp equalizer in injury-time. This meant that they would play in a Relegation and Promotion playoff over two legs against B71, who finished in second place in 1. deild. GÍ won the home leg 3–0 and also won the away leg 4–1, which meant that GÍ remained in the league.

== League table ==
Pos	Team	Pld	W	D	L	GF	GA	GD	Pts	Qualification or relegation
1	B36 Tórshavn (C)	27	15	9	3	38	17	+21	54	Qualification for the Champions League first qualifying round
2	Skála IF	27	13	11	3	55	30	+25	50	Qualification for the UEFA Cup first qualifying round
3	HB	27	15	5	7	66	35	+31	50	Qualification for the Intertoto Cup first round
4	NSÍ Runavík	27	14	8	5	58	44	+14	50	
5	EB/Streymur	27	11	10	6	48	35	+13	43	
6	ÍF	27	6	9	12	32	57	−25	27	
7	KÍ	27	7	4	16	40	52	−12	25	
8	VB Vágur	27	6	6	15	36	57	−21	24	
9	GÍ Gøta	27	6	5	16	35	58	−23	23	Qualification for the UEFA Cup first qualifying round (Note: GÍ Gøta won the 2005 Faroe Islands Cup competition and thereby qualified for the first qualifying round of the UEFA Cup.)
10	TB (R)	27	5	7	15	26	49	−23	22	Relegation to 1. deild

Rules for classification: 1st points, 2nd head-to-head, 3rd goals average
(C) Champions; (R) Relegated

== Results ==
The schedule consists of a total of 27 games. Each team plays three games against every opponent in no particular order. At least one of the games will be at home and one will be away. The additional home game for every match-up is randomly assigned prior to the season.

=== Regular home games ===
Home \ Away	B36	EBS	GÍG	HB	ÍF	KÍ	NSÍ	SKÁ	TB	VBS
B36 Tórshavn		1–0	3–0	0–0	1–1	2–1	0–1	2–2	0–0	1–0
EB/Streymur	1–2		1–1	4–0	2–2	0–0	2–2	0–0	3–0	1–1
GÍ Gøta	1–2	1–2		0–2	3–0	1–2	0–0	2–3	2–1	1–1
Havnar Bóltfelag	1–1	4–0	3–1		6–0	2–1	2–1	1–2	3–1	2–1
ÍF Fuglafjørður	0–2	2–3	4–3	1–1		0–3	1–2	0–0	1–0	3–3
KÍ Klaksvík	0–2	0–1	1–2	4–3	0–2		2–3	0–2	6–1	1–1
NSÍ Runavík	1–0	2–5	1–1	2–1	1–1	1–0		1–0	1–1	5–1
Skála ÍF	1–1	1–1	2–2	4–3	3–3	4–0	3–1		5–1	0–1
TB Tvøroyri	0–0	3–0	3–0	1–2	0–1	0–0	4–4	1–0		0–2
VB/Sumba	0–3	1–1	0–1	1–0	0–1	5–1	2–3	1–5	0–1	

Source: faroesoccer.com
Legend: Blue = home team win; Yellow = draw; Red = away team win.

=== Additional home games ===
Home \ Away	B36	EBS	GÍG	HB	ÍF	KÍ	NSÍ	SKÁ	TB	VBS
B36 Tórshavn		0–1	3–1	2–1		0–0	2–0			
EB/Streymur					1–1	1–0	2–2	0–1		6–1
GÍ Gøta		1–5				1–2	1–5	1–4		
Havnar Bóltfelag		3–0			9–0		3–1		4–1	
ÍF Fuglafjørður	0–2		1–3			3–0			0–0	
KÍ Klaksvík		2–4		2–3			5–6			5–1
NSÍ Runavík					4–1			3–3	2–0	3–1
Skála ÍF	2–2			1–1	2–1				2–0	3–1
TB Tvøroyri		1–1	3–1			1–2				
VB/Sumba	1–2		0–3	2–2	3–2				5–1	

Source: faroesoccer.com
Legend: Blue = home team win; Yellow = draw; Red = away team win.

== Top goalscorers ==
Source: faroesoccer.com

18 goals

- (Faroe Islands) Christian Høgni Jacobsen (NSÍ)

16 goals

- (Romania) Sorin Anghel (EB/Streymur)

13 goals

- (Faroe Islands) Jónhard Frederiksberg (Skála)
- (Faroe Islands) Bogi Gregersen (Skála)

11 goals

- (Faroe Islands) Allan Mørkøre (B36)
- (Faroe Islands) Hans á Lag (HB)

10 goals

- (Faroe Islands) Sámal Joensen (GÍ)

9 goals

- (Faroe Islands) Súni Olsen (GÍ)
- (Faroe Islands) Hjalgrím Elttør (KÍ)
- (Faroe Islands) Heðin á Lakjuni (KÍ)
- (Faroe Islands) Dan Djurhuus (VB/Sumba)

8 goals

- (Faroe Islands) Tór-Ingar Akselsen (HB)
- (Faroe Islands) Hans Pauli Samuelsen (EB/Streymur)
