= 1945 Meistaradeildin =

Faroese football league season

Meistaradeildin
- Season: 1945
- Champions: KÍ Klaksvík (2nd title)
- Matches played: 2
- Goals scored: 5 (2.5 per match)

1945 Meistaradeildin was the third season of Meistaradeildin, the top tier of the Faroese football league system. The teams were separated in three groups based on geographical criteria. KÍ Klaksvík defeated SÍ Sørvágur 1–0 in the championship final.

== Qualifying round ==
=== East ===
B36 and HB played only once against each other.

| Pos | Team | Pld | W | D | L | GF | GA | GD | Pts | |
|---|---|---|---|---|---|---|---|---|---|---|
| 1 | KÍ Klaksvík | 4 | 4 | 0 | 0 | 23 | 3 | +20 | 8 | Qualification to the final |
| 2 | B36 Tórshavn | 3 | 1 | 0 | 2 | 13 | 6 | +7 | 2 | |
| 3 | HB Tórshavn | 3 | 0 | 0 | 3 | 0 | 27 | −27 | 0 | |

Source: Faroe Soccer

=== West ===
MB withdrew after its first game. A playoff was held between SÍ and SÍF to decide who would advance.

| Pos | Team | Pld | W | D | L | GF | GA | GD | Pts | |
|---|---|---|---|---|---|---|---|---|---|---|
| 1 | SÍF Sandavágur | 3 | 1 | 1 | 1 | 7 | 4 | +3 | 3 | |
| 2 | SÍ Sørvágur | 2 | 1 | 0 | 1 | 4 | 7 | −3 | 2 | |
| 3 | MB Miðvágur | 1 | 0 | 1 | 0 | 0 | 0 | 0 | 1 | Withdrew |

Source: Faroe Soccer

Match played on 25 July.

| Team 1 | Score | Team 2 |
|---|---|---|
| SÍ Sørvágur | 3–2 | SÍF Sandavágur |

=== South ===
| Team 1 | Agg. | Team 2 | 1st leg | 2nd leg |
|---|---|---|---|---|
| VB Vágur | 2–8 | TB Tvøroyri | 1–1 | 1–7 |

== Semifinal ==
Match played on 12 August.

| Team 1 | Score | Team 2 |
|---|---|---|
| SÍ Sørvágur | 3–1 | TB Tvøroyri |

== Final ==
The match was played in Tórshavn on 19 August.

| Team 1 | Score | Team 2 |
|---|---|---|
| SÍ Sørvágur | 0–1 | KÍ Klaksvík |
