= 1988 1. deild =

Coordinates: 62.0167°N 6.7667°W

Faroe Islands Premier League Football
- Season: 1988
- Champions: HB
- Relegated: NSÍ
- Matches played: 90
- Goals scored: 250 (2.78 per match)

g 1988 1. deild was the 46th season of Faroese Premier League Football, and when it was referred to as 1. deild (First Division).

== Overview ==
It was contested by 10 teams, and Havnar Bóltfelag won the championship.

== League standings ==
Pos	Team	Pld	W	D	L	GF	GA	GD	Pts
1	Havnar Bóltfelag	18	11	3	4	36	19	+17	25
2	B68 Toftir	18	11	2	5	31	14	+17	24
3	B36 Tórshavn	18	8	5	5	29	20	+9	21
4	ÍF Fuglafjørður	18	6	6	6	23	25	−2	18
5	GÍ Gøta	18	8	1	9	21	25	−4	17
6	VB Vágur	18	6	4	8	24	27	−3	16
7	Leirvík ÍF	18	6	4	8	26	31	−5	16
8	KÍ Klaksvík	18	6	3	9	29	43	−14	15
9	TB Tvøroyri	18	4	6	8	16	23	−7	14
10	NSÍ Runavík	18	4	6	8	15	23	−8	14

== Results ==
Home \ Away	B36	B68	GÍG	HB	ÍF	KÍ	LÍF	NSÍ	TB	VBV
B36 Tórshavn		0–0	5–3	0–1	1–1	4–1	2–0	0–1	3–0	4–0
B68 Toftir	4–0		0–1	1–0	0–2	3–2	1–0	2–0	1–0	2–1
GÍ Gøta	0–0	0–2		2–0	2–0	3–2	0–2	1–0	2–1	0–1
HB	1–4	2–1	5–1		3–1	5–1	1–0	4–1	4–1	0–0
ÍF	0–0	2–0	1–0	1–1		3–3	0–3	1–2	3–2	2–3
KÍ	3–0	0–2	1–4	3–1	2–4		1–4	2–1	0–0	3–2
Leirvík ÍF	2–2	0–6	3–1	1–3	1–1	2–3		1–1	2–3	1–4
NSÍ Runavík	0–1	3–3	1–0	0–3	0–1	0–0	0–1		2–0	2–2
TB	1–0	1–3	1–0	0–0	0–0	4–0	1–1	0–0		0–1
VB Vágur	2–3	1–0	0–1	1–2	2–1	1–2	1–2	1–1	1–1	

Legend: Blue = home team win; Yellow = draw; Red = away team win.

== Top goalscorers ==
As of 2 June 2017

Rank	Player	Club	Goals
1	(Faroe Islands) Jógvan Petersen	B68	9
2	(England) John Owen	ÍF	8
2	(Faroe Islands) Kári Gullfoss	B36	8
2	(Faroe Islands) Kári Reynheim	B36	8
2	(Faroe Islands) Kurt Mørkøre	LÍF	8
2	(England) Martin Nugent	LÍF	8
7	(Faroe Islands) Jan Allan Müller	VB	7
8	(Iceland) Egill Steinþórsson	VB	6
8	(Faroe Islands) Gunnar Mohr	HB	6
8	(Faroe Islands) Karl Marius Poulsen	KÍ	6
8	(Faroe Islands) Rói Árting	HB	6
