= 1955 Meistaradeildin =

Faroese football league season

Meistaradeildin
- Season: 1955
- Champions: HB (1st title)
- Matches played: 12
- Goals scored: 46 (3.83 per match)

1955 Meistaradeildin was the 13th season of top-tier football on the Faroe Islands.

== League table ==
Pos	Team	Pld	W	D	L	GF	GA	GD	Pts
1	Havnar Bóltfelag	6	4	1	1	15	7	+8	9
2	TB Tvøroyri	6	3	1	2	14	15	−1	7
3	KÍ Klaksvík	6	2	1	3	7	10	−3	5
4	B36 Tórshavn	6	1	1	4	10	14	−4	3

== Results ==
Home \ Away	B36	HB	KÍ	TB
B36 Tórshavn		1–3	0–2	2–2
HB	3–1		1–1	5–1
KÍ	0–3	0–2		3–1
TB	4–3	3–1	3–1	

Source: rsssf.com
Legend: Blue = home team win; Yellow = draw; Red = away team win.
