= 1961 Meistaradeildin =

Faroese football league season

Statistics of Meistaradeildin in the 1961 season.

== Overview ==
It was contested by 4 teams, and KÍ Klaksvík won the championship.

== League table ==
Pos	Team	Pld	W	D	L	GF	GA	GD	Pts
1	KÍ Klaksvík	6	4	2	0	16	4	+12	10
2	B36 Tórshavn	6	2	1	3	16	14	+2	5
3	TB Tvøroyri	6	2	1	3	8	18	−10	5
4	Havnar Bóltfelag	6	1	2	3	4	8	−4	4

== Results ==
Home \ Away	B36	HB	KÍ	TB
B36 Tórshavn		1–1	2–3	9–1
HB	0–1		1–2	0–3
KÍ	5–0	1–1		5–0
TB	4–3	0–1	0–0	

Source: rsssf.com
Legend: Blue = home team win; Yellow = draw; Red = away team win.
