= 1966 Meistaradeildin =

Faroese football league season

The 1966 Meistaradeildin was a season of the Faroe Islands Premier League, the top-level association football league in the Faroe Islands. It was contested by five teams, with KÍ Klaksvík winning the championship.

== League table ==
Pos	Team	Pld	W	D	L	GF	GA	GD	Pts
1	KÍ Klaksvík	8	7	0	1	32	8	+24	14
2	Havnar Bóltfelag	8	5	0	3	34	10	+24	10
3	B36 Tórshavn	8	4	1	3	15	18	−3	9
4	TB Tvøroyri	8	3	0	5	15	26	−11	6
5	VB Vágur	8	0	1	7	8	42	−34	1

== Results ==
Home \ Away	B36	HB	KÍ	TB	VBV
B36 Tórshavn		0–2	1–0	3–2	2–1
HB	3–2		2–4	8–0	9–0
KÍ	7–0	2–1		5–0	6–1
TB	1–5	2–0	1–3		6–0
VB Vágur	2–2	0–9	2–5	2–3	

Source: rsssf.com
Legend: Blue = home team win; Yellow = draw; Red = away team win.
