= 1946 Meistaradeildin =

Faroese football league season

Meistaradeildin
- Season: 1946
- Champions: B36 Tórshavn (1st title)
- Matches: 13
- Goals: 9 (0.69 per match)

1946 Meistaradeildin was the fourth season of Meistaradeildin, the top tier of the Faroese football league system. The teams were separated in three groups based on geographical criteria. The season concluded when B36 Tórshavn defeated VB Vágur 3–1 in the championship final on August 18th, 1946

== Qualifying round ==
=== East ===
Pos	Team	Pld	W	D	L	GF	GA	GD	Pts	
1	B36 Tórshavn	4	3	0	1	12	4	+8	6	Qualification to the semifinals
2	KÍ Klaksvík	4	2	0	2	6	8	−2	4	
3	HB Tórshavn	4	1	0	3	3	9	−6	2	

Source: Faroe Soccer

=== West ===
SÍ played only once.

Pos	Team	Pld	W	D	L	GF	GA	GD	Pts	
1	SÍF Sandavágur	3	3	0	0	7	0	+7	6	Qualification to the semifinals
2	SÍ Sørvágur	2	0	0	2	0	4	−4	0	
3	MB Miðvágur	1	0	0	1	0	3	−3	0	

Source: Faroe Soccer

=== South ===
Both teams advanced.

Team 1	Series	Team 2	Game 1	Game 2	Game 3
TB Tvøroyri	1–1–1	VB Vágur	2–1	0–2	1–1

== Semifinals ==
Match played on 4 August.

Team 1	Score	Team 2
B36 Tórshavn	W.O.	TB Tvøroyri
SÍF Sandavágur	2–3	VB Vágur

== Final ==
The match was played on 18 August.

Team 1	Score	Team 2
B36 Tórshavn	3–1	VB Vágur
