= 1948 Meistaradeildin =

Faroese football league season

Meistaradeildin
- Season: 1948
- Champions: B36 Tórshavn (2nd title)
- Matches played: 13
- Goals scored: 76 (5.85 per match)

The 1948 Meistaradeildin was the sixth season of Meistaradeildin, the top tier of the Faroese football league system. B36 Tórshavn won its second championship.

== Teams ==
Location of teams in the 1948 Meistaradeildin

A total of 6 teams participated in the league, facing each other once. Previous season's champions SÍ Sørvágur did not participate in the league. The same applied for SÍF Sandavágur and MB Miðvágur, who participated in the previous season. B36 and HB fielded two teams each, their first and their reserve team. KÍ from Klaksvík and VB from Vágur where the other two teams.

== League table ==
Pos	Team	Pld	W	D	L	GF	GA	GD	Pts
1	B36 Tórshavn (C)	5	4	1	0	23	3	+20	9
2	HB Tórshavn	5	3	2	0	14	6	+8	8
3	KÍ Klaksvík	5	3	1	1	29	5	+24	7
4	VB Vágur	5	2	0	3	2	12	−10	4
5	HB Tórshavn II	5	1	0	4	7	21	−14	2
6	B36 Tórshavn II	5	0	0	5	1	29	−28	0

Source: Faroe Soccer
(C) Champions

== Results ==
Home \ Away	B36	B362	HB	HB2	KÍ	VB
B36 Tórshavn		11–0				5–0
B36 Tórshavn II			1–4	0–3	0–11	
HB Tórshavn	1–1				3–3	– (Note: HB won by forfeit.)
HB Tórshavn II	2–4		1–6			
KÍ Klaksvík	0–2			9–0		6–0
VB Vágur		– (Note: VB won by forfeit.)		2–1		

Source: Faroe Soccer
Legend: Blue = home team win; Yellow = draw; Red = away team win.
