= 1957 Meistaradeildin =

Faroese football league season

Statistics of Meistaradeildin in the 1957 season.

== Overview ==
It was contested by 5 teams, and KÍ Klaksvík won the championship.

== League table ==
Pos	Team	Pld	W	D	L	GF	GA	GD	Pts
1	KÍ Klaksvík	8	6	1	1	20	10	+10	13
2	VB Vágur	8	3	2	3	14	19	−5	8
3	TB Tvøroyri	8	3	1	4	15	10	+5	7
4	B36 Tórshavn	8	2	3	3	12	18	−6	7
5	Havnar Bóltfelag	8	2	1	5	14	18	−4	5

== Results ==
Home \ Away	B36	HB	KÍ	TB	VBV
B36 Tórshavn		3–3	1–3	1–1	2–3
HB	1–2		0–1	2–1	6–2
KÍ	6–0	2–0		1–0	5–2
TB	0–2	4–1	6–1		3–0
VB Vágur	1–1	3–1	1–1	2–0	

Source: rsssf.com
Legend: Blue = home team win; Yellow = draw; Red = away team win.
