= 1978 1. deild =

Coordinates: 62.0167°N 6.7667°W

Faroe Islands Premier League Football
- Season: 1978
- Champions: HB
- Relegated: B36
- Matches played: 42
- Goals scored: 138 (3.29 per match)
- Biggest home win: ÍF 4–0 MB
- Biggest away win: MB 0–7 TB
- Highest scoring: MB 0–7 TB

Statistics of 1. deild in the 1978 season.

== Overview ==
It was contested by 7 teams, and Havnar Bóltfelag won the championship.

== League standings ==
Pos	Team	Pld	W	D	L	GF	GA	GD	Pts
1	Havnar Bóltfelag	12	8	4	0	25	13	+12	20
2	TB Tvøroyri	12	9	1	2	33	11	+22	19
3	VB Vágur	12	5	3	4	21	22	−1	13
4	ÍF Fuglafjørður	12	4	3	5	17	15	+2	11
5	KÍ Klaksvík	12	1	7	4	15	20	−5	9
6	MB Miðvágur	12	1	5	6	15	30	−15	7
7	B36 Tórshavn	12	1	3	8	12	27	−15	5

== Results ==
The schedule consisted of a total of 12 games. Each team played two games against every opponent in no particular order. One of the games was at home and one was away.

Home \ Away	B36	HB	ÍF	KÍ	MBM	TB	VBV
B36 Tórshavn		0–2	0–2	0–0	2–2	0–2	1–5
HB	2–0		2–1	2–1	2–2	3–2	1–1
ÍF	3–2	1–1		0–1	4–0	1–3	3–0
KÍ	2–2	2–2	1–1		3–3	0–0	3–3
MB Miðvágur	1–2	2–4	1–1	2–1		0–7	1–2
TB	4–2	1–2	2–0	3–0	1–0		4–2
VB Vágur	2–1	0–2	2–0	2–1	1–1	1–4	

Source: www.faroesoccer.com
Legend: Blue = home team win; Yellow = draw; Red = away team win.
