= 1964 Meistaradeildin =

Faroese football league season

Statistics of Meistaradeildin in the 1964 season.

== Overview ==
It was contested by 3 teams, and Havnar Bóltfelag won the championship.

== League table ==
Pos	Team	Pld	W	D	L	GF	GA	GD	Pts
1	Havnar Bóltfelag	4	3	0	1	15	6	+9	6
2	B36 Tórshavn	4	2	0	2	6	7	−1	4
3	TB Tvøroyri	4	1	0	3	8	16	−8	2

== Results ==
Home \ Away	B36	HB	TB
B36 Tórshavn		0–3	3–2
HB	0–2		7–2
TB	2–1	2–5	

Source: rsssf.com
Legend: Blue = home team win; Yellow = draw; Red = away team win.
