= 1965 Meistaradeildin =

Faroese football league season

Statistics of the Faroe Islands premier football league, Meistaradeildin, in the 1965 season.

== Overview ==
It was contested by 4 teams, and Havnar Bóltfelag won the championship.

== League table ==
Pos	Team	Pld	W	D	L	GF	GA	GD	Pts
1	Havnar Bóltfelag	6	4	0	2	17	12	+5	8
2	B36 Tórshavn	6	3	1	2	10	12	−2	7
3	KÍ Klaksvík	6	3	0	3	12	8	+4	6
4	TB Tvøroyri	6	1	1	4	11	18	−7	3

== Results ==
Home \ Away	B36	HB	KÍ	TB
B36 Tórshavn		3–2	1–0	3–3
HB	4–1		3–1	4–2
KÍ	1–2	3–0		3–0
TB	2–0	2–4	2–4	

Source: rsssf.com
Legend: Blue = home team win; Yellow = draw; Red = away team win.
