= 1960 Meistaradeildin =

Faroese football league season

Statistics of Meistaradeildin in the 1960 season.

== Overview ==
It was contested by 4 teams, and Havnar Bóltfelag won the championship.

== League table ==
Pos	Team	Pld	W	D	L	GF	GA	GD	Pts
1	Havnar Bóltfelag	6	4	1	1	13	8	+5	9
2	B36 Tórshavn	6	2	3	1	12	11	+1	7
3	KÍ Klaksvík	6	2	2	2	11	7	+4	6
4	TB Tvøroyri	6	1	0	5	6	16	−10	2

== Results ==
Home \ Away	B36	HB	KÍ	TB
B36 Tórshavn		1–5	1–1	3–1
HB	1–1		0–3	5–3
KÍ	3–3	0–1		3–0
TB	0–3	0–1	2–1	

Source: rsssf.com
Legend: Blue = home team win; Yellow = draw; Red = away team win.
