= Faroe Islands Premier League =

Faroese association football league

- Founded: 1942; 84 years ago (as Meistaradeildin)
- Country: Faroe Islands
- Confederation: UEFA
- Number of clubs: 10
- Level on pyramid: 1
- Relegation to: 1. deild
- Domestic cup(s): Faroe Islands Cup; Faroe Islands Super Cup
- International cup(s): UEFA Champions League; UEFA Conference League
- Current champions: NSÍ Runavík (2nd title) (2026)
- Most championships: HB Tórshavn (24 titles)
- Most appearances: Fróði Benjaminsen (503)
- Top scorer: Klæmint Olsen (269)
- Broadcaster: Televarpið
- Website: fsf.fo/meistaradeildin-menn
- Current: 2026 Faroe Islands Premier League

The Faroe Islands Premier League (also known as Meistaradeildin) is the top level of football in the Faroe Islands. It was founded in 1942 as Meistaradeildin, and has been played in its current format since 2005, when the Premier League replaced 1. deild as the country's top football division. The league is organised by the Faroe Islands Football Association.

It is contested by 10 clubs. At the end of every season, two teams are relegated and two promoted from 1. deild.

At the end of the 2025/26 European season, the Faroe Islands Premier League was ranked 40th out of 55 leagues in the UEFA coefficient.

== History ==
The league was founded in 1942, although clubs did not take part in European competitions until 1992, because the Faroe Islands Football Association joined UEFA only in 1990. From 1942 to 1946, the competition was played in a knockout format, and from 1947 onwards in a league format.

Before the creation of the Faroe Islands Football Association in 1979, the league was organized by the Faroe Islands Sports Association. The only time a season was not played was during the British occupation in 1944, when a lack of footballs caused the season to be cancelled.

The league has been known by several names; from its foundation in 1942 until 1975, it was known as Meistaradeildin. It changed its name to 1. deild in 1976 and introduced promotion and relegation system. Since 2005 the league has had different sponsored names, being called Formuladeildin from 2005 to 2008, Vodafonedeildin from 2009 to 2012, Effodeildin from 2012 to 2017, Betri deildin menn from 2018 to 2025, and since 2026 Meistaradeildin menn.

== Competition format ==
The league is contested by 10 teams, who play each other three times. A draw is made before the elaboration of the next season's fixtures to decide which teams will have an additional home game. Formerly this was decided based on clubs' performance in the previous season.

=== Promotion and relegation ===
At the end of the season, two teams are relegated and two are promoted to and from 1. deild. Like in Spain, the teams are allowed to put their B and C teams in the lower divisions, and there will only be relegation if at least one non-reserve team finishes in the 1. deild top three.

The league used a promotion-relegation playoff between the 9th placed team and the 2nd placed team in 1. deild from 1995 to 2005.

=== European qualification ===
For the 2026/27 season the Faroese champion qualifies for the UEFA Champions League 1st qualifying round, while the second and third placed teams enter the UEFA Europa Conference League at the first qualifying round. An additional berth in the Europa Conference League first qualifying round is granted to the Faroe Islands Cup winners. If the winners of that competition have already qualified for a European competition, the berth is given to the fourth placed team in the league. Since the introduction of the Europa Conference League, teams from the Faroe Islands can only qualify directly to the UEFA Europa League by winning the Europa Conference League.

== Current teams ==
Locations of the 2024 Faroe Islands Premier League teams

Club	Position in 2024	City
07 Vestur	6th	Sørvágur
B36	5th	Tórshavn
B68	8th	Toftir
EB/Streymur	7th	Streymnes
FC Suðuroy	1st (promoted)	Vágur
HB	3rd	Tórshavn
KÍ	2nd	Klaksvík
NSÍ	4th	Runavík
TB	2nd (promoted)	Tvøroyri
Vikingur	1st	Norðragøta

== List of seasons ==
Bold indicates teams who also won the Faroe Islands Cup that season, an achievement known as the double.

Season	Champion	Runner-up	Top scorer (club)	Goals
1942	KÍ	TB	not available	
1943	TB	MB	not available	
1944	No tournament due to lack of footballs during the British occupation of the Faroe Islands.			
1945	KÍ (2)	SÍ	not available	
1946	B36	VB	not available	
1947	SÍ	KÍ	not available	
1948	B36 (2)	HB	not available	
1949	TB (2)	HB	not available	
1950	B36 (3)	TB	not available	
1951	TB (3)	KÍ	not available	
1952	KÍ (3)	TB	not available	
1953	KÍ (4)	HB	not available	
1954	KÍ (5)	HB	not available	
1955	**HB**	TB	not available	
1956	KÍ (6)	TB	not available	
1957	KÍ (7)	VB	not available	
1958	KÍ (8)	HB	not available	
1959	B36 (4)	KÍ	not available	
1960	HB (2)	B36	not available	
1961	KÍ (9)	B36	not available	
1962	B36 (5)	KÍ	not available	
1963	**HB** (3)	KÍ	not available	
1964	**HB** (4)	B36	not available	
1965	HB (5)	B36	not available	
1966	**KÍ** (10)	HB	not available	
1967	**KÍ** (11)	HB	not available	
1968	KÍ (12)	B36	not available	
1969	KÍ (13)	HB	not available	
1970	KÍ (14)	HB	not available	
1971	**HB** (6)	KÍ	(Faroe Islands) Heri Nolsøe (HB)	20
1972	KÍ (15)	HB	(Faroe Islands) Heri Nolsøe (HB)	16
1973	**HB** (7)	KÍ	(Faroe Islands) John Eysturoy (HB)	13
1974	HB (8)	KÍ	(Faroe Islands) Johan Johannesen (HB)	10
1975	**HB** (9)	KÍ	(Faroe Islands) Johan Johannesen (HB)	8
1976	TB (4)	HB	(Faroe Islands) Heri Nolsøe (HB)	14
1977	**TB** (5)	HB	(England) Dave R. Jones (ÍF)	12
1978	**HB** (10)	TB	(Faroe Islands) Ásmund Nolsøe (TB)	9
1979	ÍF	TB	(Faroe Islands) Meinhardt Dalbú (ÍF)	17
1980	TB (6)	HB	(Iceland) Sveinbjørn Danielsson (TB)	15
1981	**HB** (11)	TB	(Faroe Islands) Suni Jacobsen (HB)	12
1982	**HB** (12)	TB	(Faroe Islands) Henrik Thomsen (TB)	7
1983	**GÍ**	HB	(Faroe Islands) Petur Hans Hansen (B68)	10
1984	B68	TB	(Faroe Islands) Aksel Højgaard (B68) (Faroe Islands) Erling Jacobsen (HB)	10
1985	B68 (2)	HB	(Faroe Islands) Símun Petur Justinussen (GÍ)	10
1986	GÍ (2)	HB	(Denmark) Jesper Wiemer (B68)	13
1987	TB (7)	HB	(Faroe Islands) Símun Petur Justinussen (GÍ) (Iceland) Egill Steinþórsson (TB)	10
1988	**HB** (13)	B68	(Faroe Islands) Jógvan Petersen (B68)	9
1989	B71	HB	(Iceland) Egill Steinþórsson (VB)	16
1990	HB (14)	B36	(Faroe Islands) Jón Pauli Olsen (VB)	10
1991	KÍ (16)	B36	(Faroe Islands) Símun Petur Justinussen (GÍ)	15
1992	B68 (3)	GÍ	(Faroe Islands) Símun Petur Justinussen (GÍ)	14
1993	GÍ (3)	HB	(Faroe Islands) Uni Arge (HB)	11
1994	GÍ (4)	HB	(Faroe Islands) John Petersen (GÍ)	21
1995	GÍ (5)	HB	(Faroe Islands) Súni Fríði Johannesen (B68)	24
1996	**GÍ** (6)	KÍ	(Faroe Islands) Kurt Mørkøre (KÍ)	20
1997	B36 (6)	HB	(Faroe Islands) Uni Arge (HB)	24
1998	**HB** (15)	KÍ	(Faroe Islands) Jákup á Borg (B36)	20
1999	**KÍ** (17)	GÍ	(Faroe Islands) Jákup á Borg (B36)	17
2000	VB	HB	(Faroe Islands) Súni Fríði Johannesen (B68)	16
2001	**B36** (7)	GÍ	(Faroe Islands) Helgi Petersen (GÍ)	19
2002	HB (16)	NSÍ	(Faroe Islands) Andrew av Fløtum (HB)	18
2003	HB (17)	B36	(Faroe Islands) Hjalgrím Elttør (KÍ)	13
2004	**HB** (18)	B36	(Faroe Islands) Sonni Petersen (EB/Streymur)	13
2005	B36 (8)	Skála	(Faroe Islands) Christian Høgni Jacobsen (NSÍ)	18
2006	HB (19)	EB/Streymur	(Faroe Islands) Christian Høgni Jacobsen (NSÍ)	18
2007	NSÍ	EB/Streymur	(France) Amed Davy Sylla (B36)	18
2008	**EB/Streymur**	HB	(Faroe Islands) Arnbjørn Hansen (EB/Streymur)	20
2009	HB (20)	EB/Streymur	(Faroe Islands) Finnur Justinussen (Víkingur)	19
2010	HB (21)	EB/Streymur	(Faroe Islands) Arnbjørn Hansen (EB/Streymur) (Faroe Islands) Christian Høgni Jacobsen (NSÍ)	22
2011	B36 (9)	EB/Streymur	(Faroe Islands) Finnur Justinussen (Víkingur)	21
2012	EB/Streymur (2)	ÍF	(Brazil) Clayton Soares (ÍF) (Faroe Islands) Páll Klettskarð (KÍ)	22
2013	HB (22)	ÍF	(Faroe Islands) Klæmint Olsen (NSÍ)	21
2014	B36 (10)	HB	(Faroe Islands) Klæmint Olsen (NSÍ)	22
2015	B36 (11)	NSÍ	(Faroe Islands) Klæmint Olsen (NSÍ)	21
2016	Víkingur	KÍ	(Faroe Islands) Klæmint Olsen (NSÍ)	23
2017	Víkingur (2)	KÍ	(Nigeria) Adeshina Lawal (Víkingur)	17
2018	HB (23)	NSÍ	(Faroe Islands) Adrian Justinussen (HB)	20
2019	KÍ (18)	B36	(Faroe Islands) Klæmint Olsen (NSÍ)	26
2020	**HB** (24)	NSÍ	(Faroe Islands) Klæmint Olsen (NSÍ) (Serbia) Uroš Stojanov (ÍF)	17
2021	KÍ (19)	HB	(Denmark) Mikkel Dahl (HB)	27
2022	KÍ (20)	Víkingur	(Faroe Islands) Sølvi Vatnhamar (Víkingur)	20
2023	KÍ (21)	Víkingur	(Faroe Islands) Sølvi Vatnhamar (Víkingur)	21
2024	Víkingur (3)	KÍ	(Faroe Islands) Páll Klettskarð (KÍ)	23
2025	**KÍ** (22)	HB	(Faroe Islands) Klæmint Olsen (NSÍ)	26
2026	**NSÍ** (2)	KÍ	(Faroe Islands) Petur Knudsen (NSÍ)	13

== Performance by club ==
Club	Location	Titles	Runners-up
**HB**	Tórshavn	24	27
**KÍ**	Klaksvík	22	15
**B36**	Tórshavn	11	10
TB	Tvøroyri	7	10
GÍ (Note: GÍ merged with LÍF to form Víkingur in 2008.)	Norðragøta	6	3
**Víkingur**	Norðragøta / Leirvík	3	2
B68	Toftir	3	1
**EB/Streymur**	Eiði / Streymnes	2	5
**NSÍ**	Runavík	2	4
VB	Vágur	1	2
ÍF	Fuglafjørður	1	2
SÍ	Sørvágur	1	1
**B71**	Sandur	1	0
MB	Miðvágur	0	1
**Skála**	Skála	0	1

Clubs in bold are currently playing in the top tier.
Clubs in italics are no longer active in adult football.
