= 1971 Meistaradeildin =

Faroese football league season

Statistics of Meistaradeildin in the 1971 season.

== Overview ==
It was contested by 6 teams, and Havnar Bóltfelag won the championship.

== League table ==
| Pos | Team | Pld | W | D | L | GF | GA | GD | Pts |
|---|---|---|---|---|---|---|---|---|---|
| 1 | Havnar Bóltfelag | 10 | 9 | 0 | 1 | 60 | 10 | +50 | 18 |
| 2 | KÍ Klaksvík | 10 | 8 | 0 | 2 | 47 | 10 | +37 | 16 |
| 3 | VB Vágur | 10 | 5 | 1 | 4 | 32 | 34 | −2 | 11 |
| 4 | TB Tvøroyri | 10 | 3 | 0 | 7 | 17 | 39 | −22 | 6 |
| 5 | B36 Tórshavn | 10 | 2 | 1 | 7 | 12 | 32 | −20 | 5 |
| 6 | ÍF Fuglafjørður | 10 | 2 | 0 | 8 | 15 | 58 | −43 | 4 |

== Results ==
| Home \ Away | B36 | HB | ÍF | KÍ | TB | VBV |
|---|---|---|---|---|---|---|
| B36 Tórshavn | | 1–7 | 3–1 | 0–3 | 3–0 | 2–2 |
| HB | 5–0 | | 14–1 | 1–2 | 6–1 | 9–0 |
| ÍF | 2–1 | 2–7 | | 0–9 | 2–1 | 3–5 |
| KÍ | 7–0 | 1–2 | 6–0 | | 9–0 | 5–1 |
| TB | 3–1 | 0–6 | 5–1 | 3–1 | | 1–3 |
| VB Vágur | 2–1 | 2–3 | 7–3 | 3–4 | 7–3 | |

Source: rsssf.com
Legend: Blue = home team win; Yellow = draw; Red = away team win.
