= 1953 Meistaradeildin =

Faroese football league season

Meistaradeildin
- Season: 1953
- Champions: KÍ Klaksvík (4th title)
- Matches played: 12
- Goals scored: 38 (3.17 per match)

1953 Meistaradeildin was the eleventh season of Meistaradeildin, the top tier of the Faroese football league system. The championship was contested in a league format, with four teams playing against each other twice. VB Vagur although initially registered for the league, withdrew without playing any games. KÍ Klaksvík won its fourth league title in the season.

== Teams ==
Location of teams in 1953 Meistaradeildin

Since there was no second tier league, all the teams that participated in the 1952 Meistaradeildin could participate in the league. VB Vagur withdrew from the league without playing a match. Two teams from Tórshavn, HB and B36, KI from Klaksvík and TB contested in the league.

== League table ==
Pos	Team	Pld	W	D	L	GF	GA	GD	Pts	
1	KÍ Klaksvík (C)	6	5	0	1	10	4	+6	10	Champions
2	HB Tórshavn	6	3	0	3	13	11	+2	6	
3	TB Tvøroyri	6	2	1	3	11	8	+3	5	
4	B36 Tórshavn	6	1	1	4	4	15	−11	3	
5	VB Vagur	0	0	0	0	0	0	0	0	Withdrew

Updated to match(es) played on unknown. Source:
(C) Champions

== Results ==
Home \ Away	B36	HB	KÍ	TB
B36 Tórshavn		1–3	0–2	0–0
HB	2–3		1–2	4–2
KÍ	2–0	2–1		2–0
TB	6–0	1–2	2–0	

Source: rsssf.com
Legend: Blue = home team win; Yellow = draw; Red = away team win.
