= 1973 Meistaradeildin =

Faroese football league season

Statistics of Meistaradeildin in the 1973 season.

== Overview ==
It was contested by 6 teams, and Havnar Bóltfelag won the championship.

== League table ==
Pos	Team	Pld	W	D	L	GF	GA	GD	Pts
1	Havnar Bóltfelag	10	10	0	0	41	8	+33	20
2	KÍ Klaksvík	10	8	0	2	25	9	+16	16
3	TB Tvøroyri	9	4	0	5	13	12	+1	8
4	VB Vágur	9	3	1	5	18	20	−2	7
5	B36 Tórshavn	10	2	1	7	12	25	−13	5
6	ÍF Fuglafjørður	10	1	0	9	11	46	−35	2

== Results ==
Home \ Away	B36	HB	ÍF	KÍ	TB	VBV
B36 Tórshavn		0–4	5–2	1–6	1–0	0–2
HB	4–2		8–0	2–0	3–1	4–2
ÍF	4–2	0–7		0–3	0–1	2–5
KÍ	1–0	1–2	6–1		2–1	3–1
TB	1–0	0–1	5–2	1–2		– (Note: Match suspended)
VB Vágur	1–1	2–6	4–0	0–1	1–3	

Source: rsssf.com
Legend: Blue = home team win; Yellow = draw; Red = away team win.
