= Klæmint Matras =

Faroese footballer

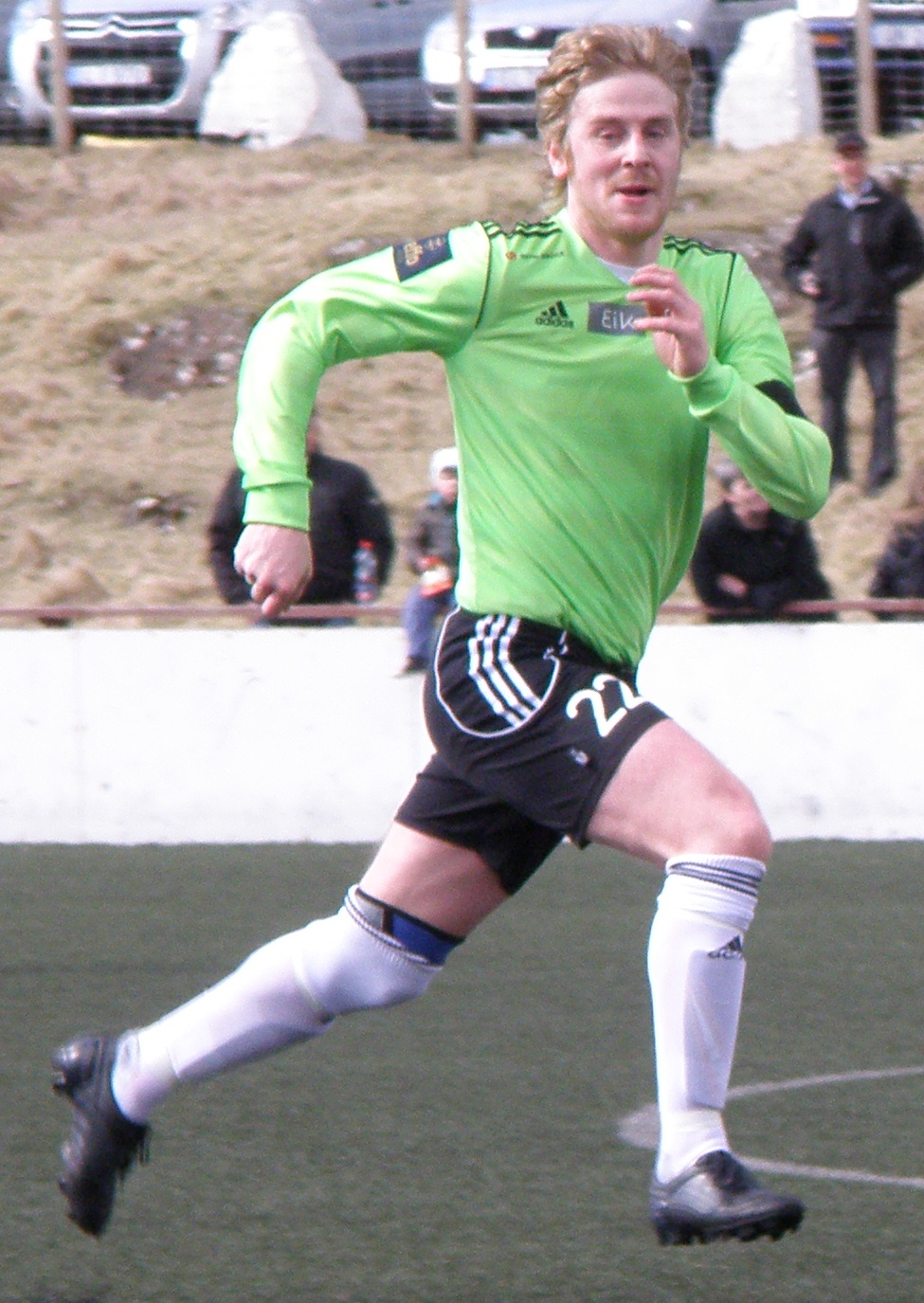

Personal information
- Date of birth: 20 May 1981 (age 45)
- Place of birth: Tórshavn, Faroe Islands
- Position: Midfielder

Team information
- Current team: B36 Tórshavn
- Number: 22

Senior career*
Years	Team	Apps	(Gls)
2000–2014	B36	277	(21)

International career^{‡}
2002	Faroe Islands	2	(0)
- * Club domestic league appearances and goals as of 8 November 2015 ‡ National team caps and goals as of 15 December 2009

Klæmint Matras (born 20 May 1981 in Tórshavn, Faroe Islands) is a retired football midfielder that spent his entire career with B36 Tórshavn in the Faroe Islands Premier League. He has also been capped with the Faroe Islands national football team.

== Club career ==
Klæmint Matras is the player of B36 Tórshavn who has most appearances in UEFA matches. According to UEFA.com he has 19 appearances. Throughout his career with B36, Matras appeared in 277 Faroe Islands Premier League matches scoring 21 goals. He also captained the team.
