= 1972 Meistaradeildin =

Faroese football league season

Statistics of Meistaradeildin in the 1972 season.

== Overview ==
It was contested by 6 teams, and KÍ Klaksvík won the championship.

== League table ==
Pos	Team	Pld	W	D	L	GF	GA	GD	Pts
1	KÍ Klaksvík	10	7	3	0	30	4	+26	17
2	Havnar Bóltfelag	10	6	4	0	41	10	+31	16
3	B36 Tórshavn	10	5	2	3	17	10	+7	12
4	TB Tvøroyri	10	4	1	5	22	19	+3	9
5	VB Vágur	10	2	0	8	11	38	−27	4
6	ÍF Fuglafjørður	10	1	0	9	12	52	−40	2

== Results ==
Home \ Away	B36	HB	ÍF	KÍ	TB	VBV
B36 Tórshavn		2–2	4–0	0–0	2–1	1–0
HB	2–0		8–0	1–1	6–0	8–1
ÍF	2–6	1–7		1–6	0–3	6–4
KÍ	1–0	1–1	7–0		2–1	8–0
TB	2–1	3–3	5–1	0–1		5–0
VB Vágur	0–1	1–3	2–1	0–3	3–2	

Source: rsssf.com
Legend: Blue = home team win; Yellow = draw; Red = away team win.
