= 1963 Meistaradeildin =

Faroese football league season

Statistics of Meistaradeildin in the 1963 season.

== Overview ==
It was contested by 4 teams, and Havnar Bóltfelag won the championship.

== League table ==
| Pos | Team | Pld | W | D | L | GF | GA | GD | Pts |
|---|---|---|---|---|---|---|---|---|---|
| 1 | Havnar Bóltfelag | 6 | 5 | 0 | 1 | 17 | 4 | +13 | 10 |
| 2 | KÍ Klaksvík | 6 | 3 | 2 | 1 | 13 | 11 | +2 | 8 |
| 3 | B36 Tórshavn | 6 | 2 | 2 | 2 | 12 | 17 | −5 | 6 |
| 4 | TB Tvøroyri | 6 | 0 | 0 | 6 | 6 | 16 | −10 | 0 |

== Results ==
| Home \ Away | B36 | HB | KÍ | TB |
|---|---|---|---|---|
| B36 Tórshavn | | 0–5 | 4–4 | 3–2 |
| HB | 3–1 | | 0–1 | 4–0 |
| KÍ | 2–2 | 1–3 | | 2–0 |
| TB | 1–2 | 1–2 | 2–3 | |

Source: rsssf.com
Legend: Blue = home team win; Yellow = draw; Red = away team win.
