= 1962 Meistaradeildin =

Faroese football league season

Statistics of Meistaradeildin in the 1962 season.

== Overview ==
It was contested by 4 teams, and B36 Tórshavn won the championship.

== League table ==
Pos	Team	Pld	W	D	L	GF	GA	GD	Pts
1	B36 Tórshavn	6	5	0	1	8	3	+5	10
2	KÍ Klaksvík	6	4	0	2	10	5	+5	8
3	Havnar Bóltfelag	6	2	0	4	6	13	−7	4
4	TB Tvøroyri	6	1	0	5	7	10	−3	2

== Results ==
Home \ Away	B36	HB	KÍ	TB
B36 Tórshavn		0–0	3–0	1–0
HB	0–2		2–0	3–2
KÍ	3–0	4–0		1–0
TB	0–2	5–1	0–2	

Source: rsssf.com
Legend: Blue = home team win; Yellow = draw; Red = away team win.
