= Hannes Agnarsson =

Faroese footballer (born 1999)

Personal information
- Date of birth: 26 February 1999 (age 27)
- Place of birth: Tórshavn, Faroe Islands
- Position: Winger

Team information
- Current team: B36 Tórshavn
- Number: 9

Youth career
- B36 Tórshavn

Senior career*
Years	Team	Apps	(Gls)
2016–2021	B36 Tórshavn	82	(11)
2022–23	HIK	11	(0)
2022	→ B36 Tórshavn (loan)	13	(2)
2023–	B36 Tórshavn	88	(15)

International career^{‡}
2014–2015	Faroe Islands U17	11	(0)
2016	Faroe Islands U19	3	(1)
2016–2019	Faroe Islands U21	4	(0)
2021–	Faroe Islands	9	(0)
- * Club domestic league appearances and goals as of 1 November 2026 ‡ National team caps and goals as of 13 October 2024 (UTC)

Hannes Agnarsson (born 26 February 1999) is a Faroese footballer who plays as a winger for B36 Tórshavn and the Faroe Islands national team.

In the Faroese cup final in 2018, Hannes Agnarsson scored a goal in the last seconds of the game. The goal brought the score to a draw. The final was the most dramatic Faroese cup final ever. B36 Tórshavn won on penalties against the local rivals HB Tórshavn after playing 9 against 11 during all 30 minutes of extra time. He moved to Denmark in 2022, studying medicine in university and playing part-time for Hellerup IK, before returning to B36 in 2023.

== International career ==
Hannes Agnarson made his debut for the Faroe Islands national football team on 9 October 2021 in a World Cup qualifier against Austria.

== Private life ==
Hannes went to Copenhagen to study medicine in February 2022 but eventually dropped out during his first year to pursue a professional career in football. His brother, Martin Agnarsson, also plays football, and they were teammates at B36.

== Honours ==
B36 Tórshavn

- Faroe Islands Cup: 2018 and 2021
