= Vagnur Mohr Mortensen =

Faroese footballer

Vagnur Mortensen
Personal information
- Full name: Vagnur Mohr Mortensen
- Date of birth: 10 February 1983 (age 43)
- Place of birth: Faroe Islands
- Height: 1.80 m (5 ft 11 in)
- Position: Defender

Youth career
- HB Tórshavn

Senior career*
Years	Team	Apps	(Gls)
1999–2012	HB Tórshavn	155	(12)
2007	→ AB (loan)	1	(0)

International career
2004–2010	Faroe Islands	4	(0)
- * Club domestic league appearances and goals

Vagnur Mohr Mortensen (born 10 February 1983) is a Faroese retired footballer who played for HB Tórshavn. He played at HB for his whole career and was capped by the Faroe Islands 4 times. He played as a defender.

== Club career ==
Mortensen made his senior debut in 1999 and won 4 league titles with HB until his retirement in 2012. In 2006, he scored an 89th-minute goal on the final day of the season which helped win HB the league title with minutes to spare.

In August 2012, during a win over rivals B36 Tórshavn, he suffered a broken fibula and announced his retirement from football shortly afterwards. His shinbone was damaged so badly that he wouldn't be able to play football at a high level again. In total, he made 156 appearances for HB in the top division also scoring 12 goals.

== International career ==
Mortensen has been capped with the Faroe Islands four times.
