= 1950 Meistaradeildin =

Faroese football league season

Meistaradeildin
- Season: 1950
- Champions: B36 Tórshavn (3rd title)
- Matches played: 16
- Goals scored: 80 (5 per match)

1950 Meistaradeildin was the eighth season of Meistaradeildin, the top tier of the Faroese football league system. B36 Tórshavn won its third league title in the season.

== Overview ==
| Pos | Team | Pld | W | D | L | GF | GA | GD | Pts |
|---|---|---|---|---|---|---|---|---|---|
| 1 | B36 Tórshavn (C) | 8 | 6 | 2 | 0 | 22 | 6 | +16 | 14 |
| 2 | TB Tvøroyri | 8 | 4 | 1 | 3 | 25 | 10 | +15 | 9 |
| 3 | HB Tórshavn | 8 | 4 | 1 | 3 | 19 | 11 | +8 | 9 |
| 4 | KÍ Klaksvík | 8 | 2 | 2 | 4 | 11 | 13 | −2 | 6 |
| 5 | VB Vágur | 8 | 1 | 0 | 7 | 3 | 40 | −37 | 2 |

Updated to match(es) played on unknown. Source:
(C) Champions

== Results ==
| Home \ Away | B36 | HB | KÍ | TB | VB |
|---|---|---|---|---|---|
| B36 Tórshavn | | 2–1 | 2–2 | 2–1 | 5–0 |
| HB | 1–5 | | 1–1 | 4–1 | 4–0 |
| KÍ | – (Note: Since KÍ Klaksvík did not appear for the game, the match was rated 5–0 for B36 Tórshavn, B36's highest win of the season.) | 3–2 | | 1–6 | 4–2 |
| TB | 1–1 | 0–1 | – (Note: Since KÍ Klaksvík did not appear for the game, the match was rated with the first leg result of 6–1 for TB Tvøroyri.) | | 13–1 |
| VB | 0–5 | 0–5 | – (Note: The match was rated as a victory without goals for VB Vágur.) | 0–4 | |

Source: rsssf.com
Legend: Blue = home team win; Yellow = draw; Red = away team win.
