= 1952 Meistaradeildin =

Faroese football league season

Meistaradeildin
- Season: 1952
- Champions: KÍ Klaksvík (3rd title)
- Matches played: 20
- Goals scored: 65 (3.25 per match)

1952 Meistaradeildin was the tenth season of Meistaradeildin, the top tier of the Faroese football league system. The championship was contested in a league format, with five teams playing against each other twice. KÍ Klaksvík won its third league title in the season.

== Overview ==
| Pos | Team | Pld | W | D | L | GF | GA | GD | Pts |
|---|---|---|---|---|---|---|---|---|---|
| 1 | KÍ Klaksvík (C) | 8 | 7 | 0 | 1 | 21 | 6 | +15 | 14 |
| 2 | TB Tvøroyri | 8 | 7 | 0 | 1 | 24 | 7 | +17 | 14 |
| 3 | HB Tórshavn | 8 | 3 | 0 | 5 | 10 | 17 | −7 | 6 |
| 4 | VB Vagur | 8 | 1 | 2 | 5 | 7 | 21 | −14 | 4 |
| 5 | B36 Tórshavn | 8 | 0 | 2 | 6 | 3 | 14 | −11 | 2 |

Updated to match(es) played on unknown. Source:
(C) Champions

== Results ==
| Home \ Away | B36 | HB | KÍ | TB | VB |
|---|---|---|---|---|---|
| B36 Tórshavn | | 0–1 | 0–2 | 0–1 | 0–0 |
| HB | 2–1 | | 0–1 | 1–3 | 2–1 |
| KÍ | 2–0 | 5–0 | | 2–1 | 5–1 |
| TB | 4–0 | 3–2 | 4–2 | | 6–0 |
| VB | 2–2 | 3–2 | 0–2 | 0–2 | |

Source: rsssf.com
Legend: Blue = home team win; Yellow = draw; Red = away team win.
