= Arnbjørn Hansen =

Faroese football player (born 1986)

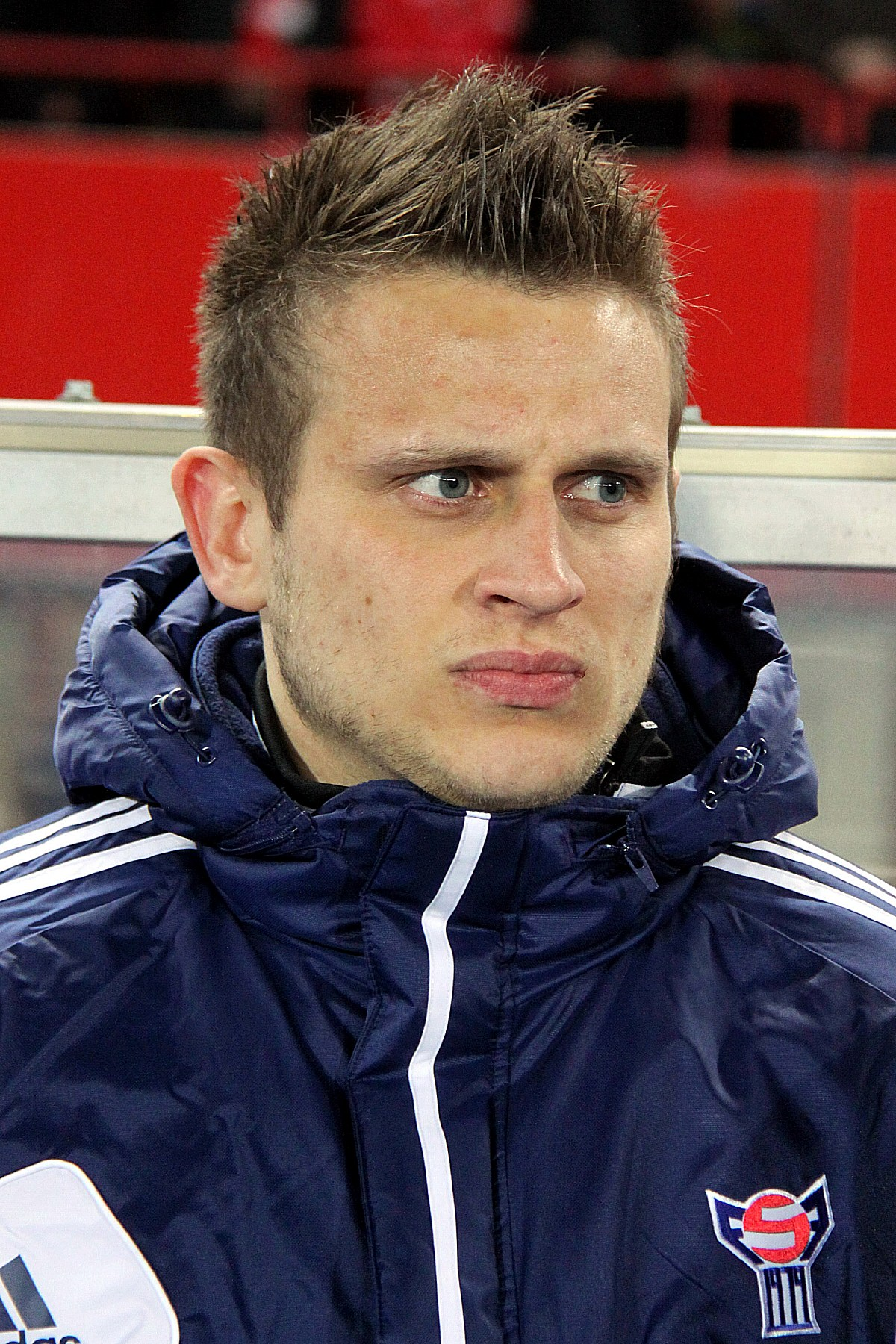

Personal information
- Full name: Arnbjørn Theodor Hansen
- Date of birth: 27 February 1986 (age 40)
- Place of birth: Eiði, Faroe Islands
- Height: 1.75 m (5 ft 9 in)
- Position: Striker

Team information
- Current team: EB/Streymur
- Number: 22

Senior career*
Years	Team	Apps	(Gls)
2003–2014	EB/Streymur	209	(131)
2015–2016	HB Tórshavn	11	(7)
2017–	EB/Streymur	61	(17)

International career^{‡}
2004	Faroe Islands U19	2	(0)
2007	Faroe Islands U21	4	(1)
2006–	Faroe Islands	17	(3)
- * Club domestic league appearances and goals as of 20 November 2020 ‡ National team caps and goals as of 20 November 2020

Arnbjørn Theodor Hansen (Faroese pronunciation: [ˈaɻɳ.ˌpjœtn ˈhan̥s.ɛn]; born 27 February 1986 in Eiði) is a Faroese football striker who plays for EB/Streymur in the Faroe Islands Premier League. He has also played for the Faroe Islands national team from 2006 to 2014. As of 20 November 2020 he has played 288 matches and scored 155 goals in the Faroe Islands Premier League

== Career ==
Arnbjørn Theodor Hansen has some good skills in handball and football. Through his younger years he played with HB and EB/Streymur. When Arnbjørn was at HB, he was 12 years old. He moved to EB/Streymur after his short spell at HB and it was there his football career really started. He had trials at Danish club Odense BK, but was not offered a contract with the Danish Superliga team. In 2008 Arnbjørn Hansen scored 20 goals in the Faroe Islands Premier League, the top Faroese division, for EB/Streymur. In 2006, he won the title "Best young player of the year". He was chosen as player of the year 2008. Hansen won the Faroese Golden Boot 2008 for being the top scorer in the top Faroese division, Vodafonedeildin. He scored 20 goals, which was 5 goals more than number two on the top scoring list, Andrew av Fløtum from HB Tórshavn, who scored 15. He also won the golden boot in 2010 together with Christian Høgni Jacobsen from NSÍ; they scored 22 goals each.

== International goals ==
Scores and results list Faroe Islands' goal tally first.

#	Date	Venue	Opponent	Score	Result	Competition
1	9 September 2009	Svangaskarð, Toftir, Faroe Islands	Lithuania	2–1	2–1	2010 FIFA World Cup qualifying
2	7 June 2011	Svangaskarð, Toftir, Faroe Islands	Estonia	2–0	2–0	UEFA Euro 2012 qualifying
3	16 October 2012	Tórsvøllur, Tórshavn, Faroe Islands	Republic of Ireland	1–2	1–4	2014 World Cup qualifier

== Honours ==
- Faroese Premier League: 2008 and 2012
- Faroese Premier League Runner-up: 2006, 2007, 2009, 2010 and 2011

=== Individual ===
- Faroe Islands Player of the Year: 2008
- Effodeildin Team of the Season: 2012
