= Hjalgrím Elttør =

Faroese footballer

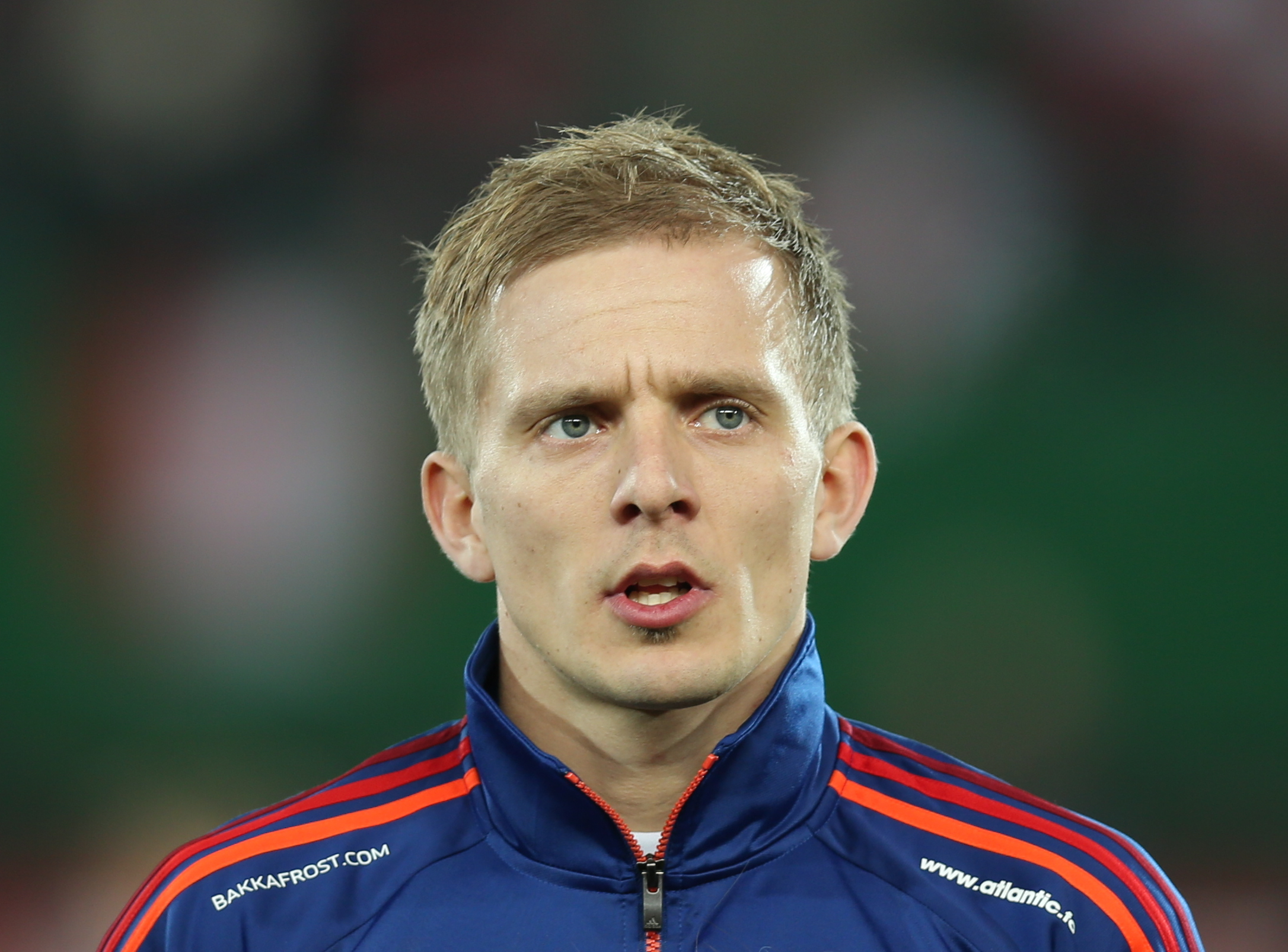

Personal information
- Date of birth: 3 March 1983 (age 43)
- Place of birth: Klaksvík, Faroe Islands
- Height: 1.78 m (5 ft 10 in)
- Position: Striker

Team information
- Current team: KÍ Klaksvík

Youth career
- KÍ Klaksvík

Senior career*
Years	Team	Apps	(Gls)
2000–2003	KÍ Klaksvík	68	(27)
2004–2005	Fremad Amager	18	(2)
2005–2006	KÍ Klaksvík	53	(15)
2007–2009	NSÍ Runavík	47	(14)
2009	KÍ Klaksvík	11	(7)
2010	B36 Tórshavn	27	(7)
2011–	KÍ Klaksvík	131	(26)

International career^{‡}
2007–	Faroe Islands	28	(0)
- * Club domestic league appearances and goals as of 16 November 2015 ‡ National team caps and goals as of 24 January 2015

Hjalgrím Elttør (born 3 March 1983) is a Faroese footballer who plays as a forward for Faroe Islands Premier League club KÍ Klaksvík. He is also a member of Faroe Islands national football team, where he has earned 27 caps.
