= Faroe Islands football league system =

The Faroe Islands league system is a series of interconnected leagues for club football in the Faroe Islands. As of 2018, there are 48 participating men's teams and 15 women's teams in the football league.

== The system ==
Below shows how the current system, as of 2018, works. For each division, its English name, official name or sponsorship name (which often differs radically from its official name) and number of clubs is given. Each division promotes to the division(s) that lie directly above them and relegates to the division(s) that lie directly below them.

=== Men's leagues ===
| Level | League(s) / Division(s) |
|---|---|
| 1 | Faroe Islands Premier League; Betri Deildin menn - (Nationwide League); 10 clubs |
| | ↓↑ 2 clubs |
| 2 | 1. division men 1. deild menn - (Nationwide League); 10 clubs |
| | ↓↑ 2 clubs |
| 3 | 2. division men 2. deild menn - (Nationwide League); 12 clubs |
| | ↓↑ 2 clubs |
| 4 | 3. division men 3. deild menn - (Nationwide League); 18 clubs |

==== Cup competitions ====
- Faroe Islands Cup
- Faroe Islands Super Cup

=== Women's leagues ===
| Level | League(s) / Division(s) |
|---|---|
| 1 | 1. division women Betri Deildin kvinnur - (Nationwide League); 6 clubs |
| 2 | 2. division women 2. deild kvinnur - (Nationwide League); 8 clubs |

==== Cup competitions ====
- Faroese Women's Cup
