= Andrew av Fløtum =

Faroese footballer (born 1979)

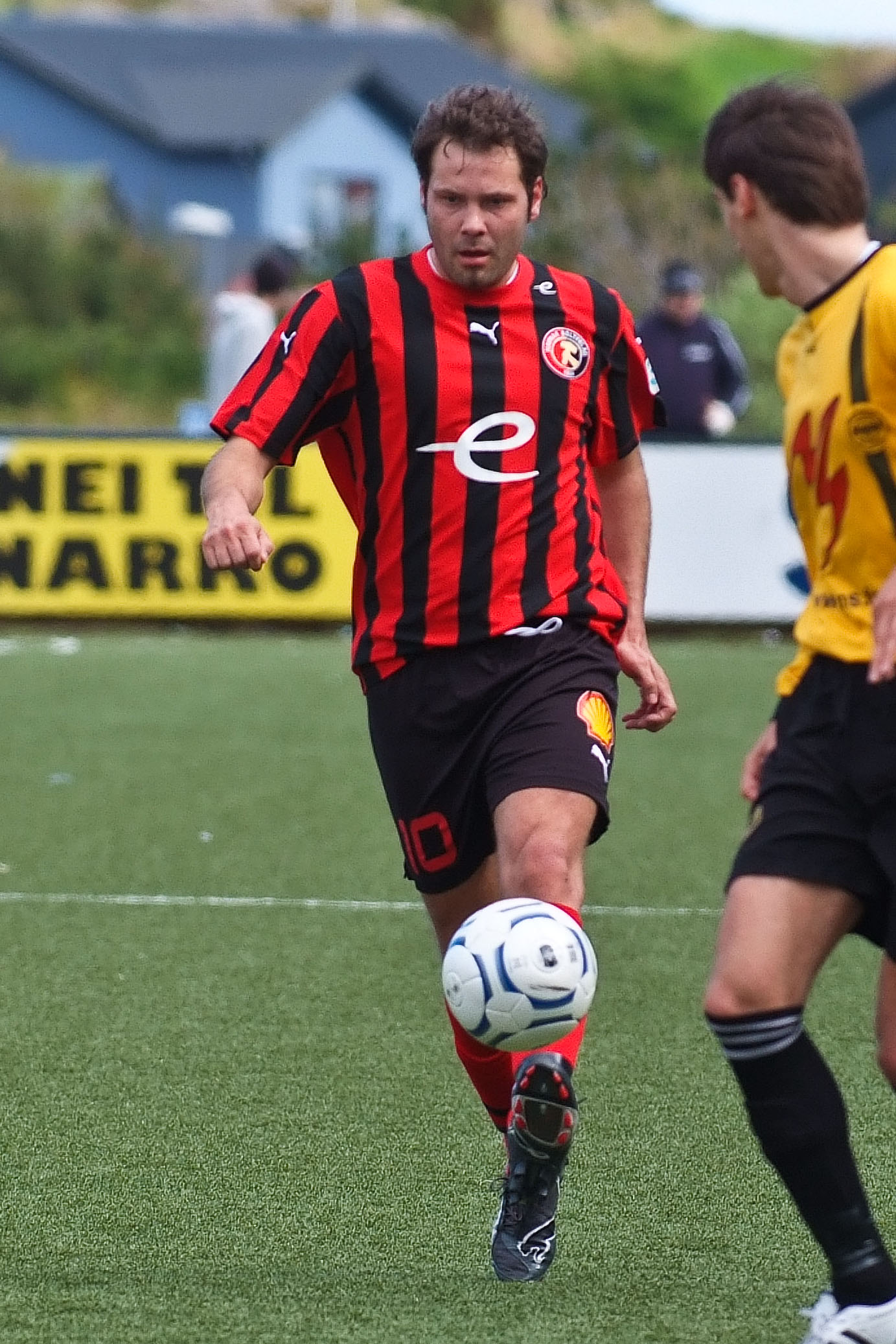

Personal information
- Date of birth: 13 June 1979 (age 47)
- Place of birth: Tórshavn, Faroe Islands
- Height: 1.84 m (6 ft 0 in)
- Position: Striker

Team information
- Current team: HB Tórshavn
- Number: 10

Senior career*
Years	Team	Apps	(Gls)
1996–2003	HB Tórshavn	110	(58)
2003–2007	Fremad Amager	85	(29)
2007–	HB Tórshavn	87	(45)

International career^{‡}
2001–	Faroe Islands	35	(1)
- * Club domestic league appearances and goals as of 13 November 2010 ‡ National team caps and goals as of 23 May 2010

Andrew av Fløtum (born 13 June 1979) is a Faroese football striker, currently playing for Faroe Islands Premier League Football team HB Tórshavn.

== Club career ==
He made his debut in Faroese football with HB Tórshavn as a midfielder in the 1996 season and later became a striker. In 2002, he became the league top goalscorer with 18 goals. After winning the player of the year award in 2003, he earned himself a move to Danish club Fremad Amager and spent 4 years in Denmark. He returned to HB in 2007.

== International career ==
Andrew av Fløtum made his debut for the Faroe Islands in a January 2001 friendly match against Sweden, coming on as a substitute for Uni Arge. He has collected 35 caps since, scoring 1 goal.

== International goals ==
Scores and results list Faroe Islands' goal tally first.

#	Date	Venue	Opponent	Score	Result	Competition
1	29 April 2003	Tórsvøllur, Tórshavn, Faroe Islands	Kazakhstan	1-1	2-1	Friendly

== Personal life ==
Besides playing football, Andrew works in a school for children with physical and mental disabilities. He is married and has three daughters.
