= Christian Høgni Jacobsen =

Faroese footballer (born 1980)

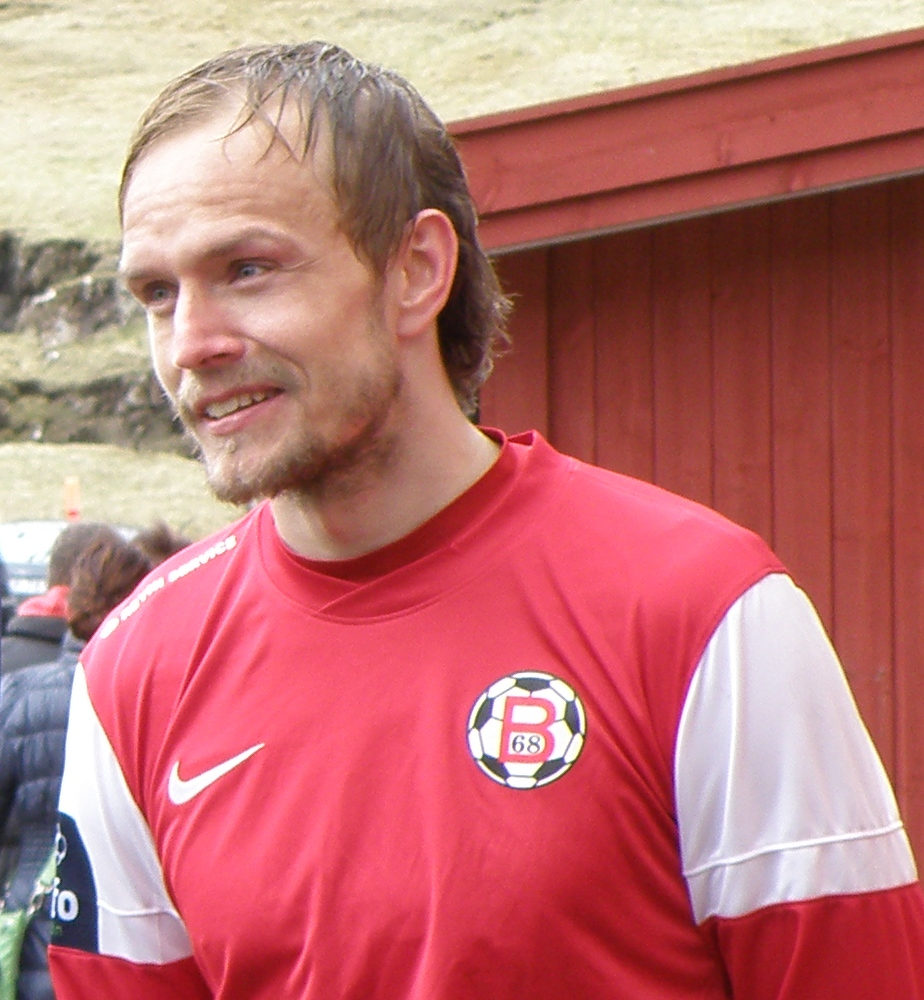
- Christian Høgni Jacobsen in 2012

Personal information
- Date of birth: 12 May 1980 (age 46)
- Place of birth: Runavík, Faroe Islands
- Height: 1.83 m (6 ft 0 in)
- Positions: Midfielder; striker

Team information
- Current team: Kauslunde IF

Senior career*
Years	Team	Apps	(Gls)
1997–2001	NSÍ Runavík	43	(39)
2001–2002	Esbjerg fB	3	(0)
2001–2002	Vejle BK	10	(0)
2002	NSÍ	5	(0)
2002–2004	Vejle BK	37	(9)
2005–2006	NSÍ	52	(36)
2007–2008	HB Tórshavn	31	(14)
2007	→ NSÍ (loan)	9	(5)
2008–2009	AB	16	(6)
2009–2011	NSÍ	65	(44)
2012	B68 Toftir	26	(5)
2013–2014	ÍF Føroyar		
2014–2015	NSÍ	11	(7)
- Kauslunde IF

International career^{‡}
2001–2010	Faroe Islands	50	(2)
- * Club domestic league appearances and goals as of 24 April 2012 ‡ National team caps and goals as of 9 September 2011

Christian Høgni Jacobsen (born 12 May 1980) is a Faroese football striker, who lastly played for NSÍ. Jacobsen has also played for HB, and B68. He has been the topscorer of the Faroe Islands Premier League 3 times. Jacobsen had spells in Denmark with Esbjerg, Vejle, AB, and ÍF Føroyar. He has gained caps with Faroe Islands at senior level.

== Club career ==
He made his debut in Faroese football with NSÍ Runavík in the 1997 season and later moved abroad to play for Danish sides Esbjerg fB and Vejle BK before returning to the Faroe Islands in 2004. He played for NSÍ in 2005 and 2006, in 2007 he played for HB Tórshavn the first half and for NSÍ Runavík in the second half of the season. In 2008, he played for HB Tórshavn and in 2009 to 2011 he played for NSÍ Runavík. In 2012, he plays for B68 Toftir. In December 2012 he signed for Danish club ÍF Føroyar.

=== Winner of the Golden Boot 2010, 2006 and 2005 ===
Christian Høgni Jacobsen scored 22 goals in Vodafonedeildin in 2010 and won the golden boot for being the top scorer that year together with Arnbjørn Hansen from EB/Streymur. Jacobsen won the golden boot in 2005 and 2006. Both years he scored 18 goals for NSÍ.

== International career ==
Høgni Jacobsen made his debut for the Faroe Islands in a January 2001 friendly match against Sweden, coming on as a substitute for Todi Jónsson. He has collected 50 caps since, scoring 2 goals.

== International goals ==
Scores and results list Faroe Islands' goal tally first.

#	Date	Venue	Opponent	Score	Result	Competition
1.	24 March 2001	Stade Josy Barthel, Luxembourg City, Luxembourg	Luxembourg	2–0	2–0	2002 WC Qualifying
2.	21 August 2002	Tórsvøllur, Tórshavn, Faroe Islands	Liechtenstein	1–1	3–1	Friendly
