= John Petersen (footballer) =

Faroese footballer and manager (born 1972)

Personal information
- Date of birth: 22 April 1972 (age 54)
- Place of birth: Faroe Islands
- Height: 1.85 m (6 ft 1 in)
- Position: Striker

Senior career*
Years	Team	Apps	(Gls)
1988–1992	Skála ÍF	32	(21)
1993	B68 Toftir	9	(3)
1994	GÍ Gøta	48	(40)
1995	Skive IK	?	(?)
1995–1996	GÍ Gøta	30	(19)
1997–2000	B36 Tórshavn	54	(54)
2000	ÍF Leiftur	15	(5)
2001–2004	B36	69	(49)
2005	Holstebro BK	3	(0)
2005	B68	3	(2)
2005–2006	Skive IK	9	(3)

International career
1995–2004	Faroe Islands	57	(6)

Managerial career
- 2007–2008: Skála ÍF
- 2011: B36 Tórshavn
- 2019–: Faroe Islands (women)
- * Club domestic league appearances and goals

John Petersen (born 22 April 1972) is a retired Faroese football striker and the current manager for the Faroe Islands women's national football team.

== Club career ==
A prolific striker, Petersen has won Faroese league winner medals with GÍ Gøta and B36 Tórshavn. He then moved to play with compatriots Jens Martin Knudsen, Sámal Joensen and Jens Erik Rasmussen at Leiftur in the Icelandic league only to return to the Faroe Islands after a disappointing season in which the team relegated. Petersen was Faroese league top goalscorer in the 1994 season. He also had a short spell with Danish sides Holstebro BK and Skive IK. John Petersen is the second most scoring footballer in the Faroese league, with 147 goals.

== International career ==
Petersen made his debut for the Faroe Islands in an October 1995 European Championship qualifying match against San Marino, coming on as a substitute for Todi Jónsson. On 7 September 2002, Petersen scored 2 goals within the first 8 minutes in a European Championship qualifying match, to give the Faroe Islands a 2–0 lead against Scotland. Given the chance to extend Faroe Islands lead to 3-0 after half time, alone with the goalie, Petersens attempt went above the post, as the ball hit a trench before impact. The final score ended 2-2. In total, he collected 57 caps, scoring six goals.

== International goals ==
Scores and results list Faroe Islands' goal tally first.

#	Date	Venue	Opponent	Score	Result	Competition
1.	24 April 1996	Stadion Crvena Zvezda, Belgrade, Serbia	FR Yugoslavia	1–3	1–3	1998 FIFA World Cup Qualifying
2.	14 October 1998	Pittodrie Stadium, Aberdeen, Scotland	Scotland	1–2	1–2	2000 Euro qualifying
3.	7 October 2000	Letzigrund, Zürich, Switzerland	Switzerland	1–0	1–5	2002 FIFA World Cup qualifying
4.	7 September 2002	Svangaskarð, Toftir, Faroe Islands	Scotland	1–0	2–2	2004 Euro qualifying
5.	7 September 2002	Svangaskarð, Toftir, Faroe Islands	Scotland	2–0	2–2	2004 Euro qualifying
6.	27 April 2003	Svangaskarð, Toftir, Faroe Islands	Kazakhstan	2–0	3–2	Friendly

== Manager career ==
Petersen was head coach of B36 Tórshavn in 2011. He was coach of Skála ÍF for one and a half years in 2007 and 2008. He was assisting coach for AB Argir in 2009 and assisting coach for Viborg FF in 2007. Petersen was assisting coach for Faroe Islands national football team in the period 2006 to 2008. He was the head coach of the Faroe Islands U19 women's national team. and since January 2019 he has been the head coach for the Faroe Islands women's national football team.

== Handball career ==
Petersen has played on the national handball team of the Faroe Islands. He played for the clubs StÍF and Neistin.
