= Uni Arge =

Faroese footballer, journalist, writer, and artist

Personal information
- Full name: Uni Jógvanson Arge
- Date of birth: 20 January 1971 (age 55)
- Place of birth: Tórshavn, Faroe Islands
- Height: 1.84 m (6 ft 0 in)
- Position: Striker

Youth career
- HB Tórshavn

Senior career*
Years	Team	Apps	(Gls)
1988–1997	HB Tórshavn	137	(96)
1998–1999	Leiftur	28	(13)
1999	HB Tórshavn	2	(6)
1999–2000	FC Aarhus		
2000	IA Akranes	12	(1)
2001–2005	HB Tórshavn	19	(9)

International career
1992–2002	Faroe Islands	37	(8)
- * Club domestic league appearances and goals

Uni Jógvanson Arge (born 20 January 1971 in Tórshavn) is a Faroese journalist, writer, musician, singer and a former international football striker.

== Career ==
Arge started is career with HB Tórshavn and made the first team in 1988. In June that year he came on as a substitute against IF from Fuglafjørður and scored shortly later. HB Tórshavn went on to win both the Championship and the Cup in 1988. Arge is the most scoring player in HB Tórshavn's history. He scored 182 goals in 232 matches and won the Championship three times and the Cup four times. HB were runners up in the League with Arge in the team four times and attended two more Cup finals, which they eventually lost.

In 1998, he moved to Iceland to join Leiftur in Ólafsfjørður and later IA in Akranes. In Iceland he played 50 matches and scored 22 goals. With IA he won the Cup in 2000 becoming the first Faroese footballer to win the Cup abroad. Together with the famous Faroese goalkeeper, Jens Martin Knudsen, he also was a finalist in 1998 with Leiftur, which were defeated 2-0 by IBV. Returning from Iceland in 2001 he joined HB Tórshavn and retired in 2002. He made a memorable comeback in 2005 when he came on as a substitute against TB from Tvøroyri and scored a stunner after only 40 seconds. Arge has played several matches in the European Cup for HB, Leiftur and Akranes and scored against Apoel Nicosia in a 1–1 draw with HB in 1997.

== International career ==
Arge made his debut for the Faroe Islands national football team in an August 1992 friendly match against Israel and earned 37 caps and 8 goals between 1992 and 2002. He is most memorable for scoring his country's first ever World Cup goal against Cyprus in April 1993. His goal against Spain in the Faroe Islands in 1996 is also famous for his celebration after defeating the world's best goalkeeper at that time, Zubizarreta.

One of his best performances was in the 2–2 draw against Bosnia Herzegovina on homeground in 1999, where he scored both the Faroese goals. He also had his influence on the remarkable comeback against Slovenia in the Faroes in 2000, where the Faroese team came from being behind 0–2 to clinch a 2–2 draw three minutes from time with goals from Arge and Øssur Hansen. On the national team Arge formed a great attacking duo together with former FC Copenhagen star striker Todi Jónsson.

== International goals ==
Scores and results list Faroe Islands' goal tally first.

#	Date	Venue	Opponent	Score	Result	Competition
1	25 April 1993	Tsirion Stadium, Limassol, Cyprus	Cyprus	3–1	3–1	1994 WC Qualifying
2	4 September 1996	Svangaskarð, Toftir, Faroe Islands	Spain	2–6	2–6	1998 WC Qualifying
3	8 June 1997	Svangaskarð, Toftir, Faroe Islands	Malta	1–0	2–1	1998 WC Qualifying
4	9 June 1999	Svangaskarð, Toftir, Faroe Islands	Bosnia and Herzegovina	1–1	2–2	2000 Euro qualifying
5	9 June 1999	Svangaskarð, Toftir, Faroe Islands	Bosnia and Herzegovina	2–1	2–2	2000 Euro qualifying
6	26 April 2000	Rheinpark Stadion, Vaduz, Liechtenstein	Liechtenstein	1–0	1–0	Friendly
7	3 September 2000	Svangaskarð, Toftir, Faroe Islands	Slovenia	1–2	2–2	2002 WC Qualifying
8	13 February 2002	Pafiako Stadium, Paphos, Cyprus	Liechtenstein	1–0	1–0	Friendly

== Bibliography ==
Uni Arge is an educated journalist from The Danish School of Journalism in Aarhus, Denmark, and has for many years worked for different Faroese media sources, both as employed and free-lance, also during his years as an international footballer. In 2004, he published his first book "Komin er nú onnur øld", analysing various political and social aspects of life on the Faroes. In 2011, he published his second book Framtíðin kallar (Future is calling). Since then he has written nine more books.

- Komin er nú onnur øld, Tjarnardeild, Tórshavn, 2004. ISBN 99918-935-7-1
- Framtíðin kallar, Sprotin, Tórshavn, 2011. ISBN 978-99918-71-57-8
- Sálarfrøðingar í Føroyum - 1973–2013, Felagið Føroyskir Sálarfrøðingar 2014
- Føroyar framá, ÍSF 75 ár, ÍSF 2014
- Gróður í Havn, Tórshavnar kommuna, 2018
- Føroyskir magistarar, Magistarafelag Føroya 1984–2019, 2021
- Pedagogar í Føroyum, Føroya Pedagogfelag 1982-2022, 2022
- Veðursjúka, Sprotin, 2023
- Ross og fólk, Føroya Ríðingarfelag 1943-2023, Sprotin, 2023
- Veðursjúka 2, Sprotin, 2024
- Brøgd og brestir, Forlagið Slóðir, 2025

== Discography ==
In November 2007, Arge released his first solo album, "Mitt í sjónum", which has two meanings, it can mean "in the middle of the ocean" and "in the middle of visions". In July 2009 he released his second album, "Meldurtíð," and in November 2014 his third album, "Meðan vindurin strýkur," was released. He has written all the songs himself and performs as a singer and a guitarist on all three albums together with some of the Faroe Islands' finest musicians. Many of his songs have become popular on the islands, the song "Býarmynd" being the most popular on Spotify with 270.000 streamings. In 1997 he wrote the lyrics on the album "Síðsta skríggj". These are his albums:

- "Síðsta skríggj", 1997, lyrics
- "Mitt í sjónum", 2007
- "Meldurtíð", 2009
- "Meðan vindurin strýkur", 2014

== Documentaries ==
As a journalist Arge has written and narrated several radio og TV programs, often with historical content. These are some of his TV documentaries.

- Lítla Dímun - gimsteinurin í sjónum, 71 min., 2014
- Varðin - frá hóttandi húsagangi til stórreiðarí í Norðurhøvum, 32 min., 2015
- Gjógv - millum Norðhavið og Skarðið, 53 min., 2016
- Stríðsmenn í Havn - Havnar Arbeiðsmannafelag 100 ár, 80 min., 2017
- Ein dagur í sjúkrarøktini, 55 min., 2018
- Nýggjár í Vági - ein filmur um samanhald, 45 min., 2018
- Teir váðafúsu menninir, Kringvarp Føroya, 50 min., 2019
- Tann valdsmikla tøknin, Kringvarp Føroya, 42 min., 2019
- Við trøum skal land prýðast, Kringvarp Føroya, 50 min., 2019
- Nýggjar røddir á tingi, Kringvarp Føroya, 35 min., 2020
- Føstulávint í Sumba, Kringvarp Føroya, 35 min. 2020

From September 2023 to April 2026 he has produced and hosted the radio program "Vágskálin" at Kringvarp Føroya, Faroe Islands. It's a program with cultural reviews primarily about Faroese books. So far 92 episodes have been broadcast.

== Family ==
His father is author, journalist, politician and football announcer Jógvan Arge, who is one of the most famous radio reporters of the Faroe Islands and also one of the islands' best selling authors. He was a member of Tórshavn City Council from 2000 to 2016.

His grandfather, Niels Juel Arge (1920-1995), was also an author and was the director of Faroese Broadcasting (Útvarp Føroya) from 1960 to 1990. Niels' and Jógvan's work at Faroese Broadcasting is recognized as a huge contribution to Faroese cultural heritage. They have written 45 books on various historical matters relating to the Faroe Islands.

His uncle, Magni Arge, was managing director of the Faroese airline Atlantic Airways from 1995 to 2013. He was in 2015 elected to the Faroese Parliament, Løgtingið, and came second to the leader of the Faroese Republican Party, Høgni Hoydal, to be elected to the Danish Parliament, Folketinget, where he served until 2019, because Hoydal served as the Minister of Fisheries in the Faroe Islands.

His daughter, Turið Arge Samuelsen, has for many years been a national handball player for the Faroe Islands and has won the Faroese championship five times and the Faroese cup six times with Kyndil Handball Club, Tórshavn. She participated in the European Championships in Basel 2024, where the Faroe Islands earned their first ever championship point in a 17-17 draw against Croatia. She is the top-scoring player for her club with more than 2,000 goals in the national liga (a record) and one of the highest scoring players on the national team.
