= Kurt Mørkøre =

Faroese footballer and manager

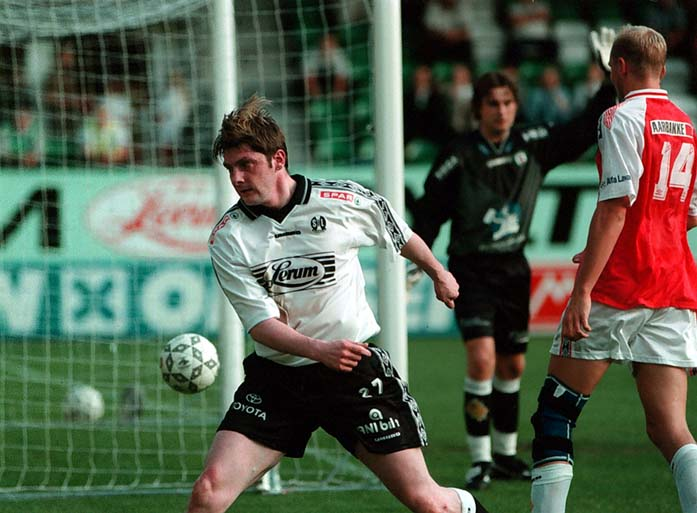
- Kurt Mørkøre for Sogndal IL

Personal information
- Date of birth: 20 February 1969 (age 57)
- Place of birth: Faroe Islands
- Height: 1.84 m (6 ft 0 in)
- Positions: Midfielder; striker

Team information
- Current team: Averøykameratene (manager)

Senior career*
Years	Team	Apps	(Gls)
1986–1987	KÍ Klaksvík	?	(?)
1988	Leirvík ÍF	?	(13)
1989–1990	KÍ	?	(?)
1991–1994	KÍ	53	(12)
1994	Skarbøvik IF	?	(?)
1994	KÍ	8	(9)
1995	B68 Toftir	8	(7)
1995	Skarbøvik IF	?	(?)
1995–1999	KÍ	60	(66)
1999–2001	Sogndal IL	39	(26)
2001–2002	KÍ	22	(17)
2005	KÍ	6	(3)

International career^{‡}
1988–2001	Faroe Islands	37	(3)

Managerial career
- 2002: KÍ
- 2007: B36 Tórshavn
- 2008–2010: Elnesvågen/Omegn
- 2011–: Averøykameratene
- * Club domestic league appearances and goals as of 16 October 2010 ‡ National team caps and goals as of 16 October 2010

Kurt Mørkøre (born 20 February 1969) is a Faroese former football midfielder or striker who is currently manager of the Norwegian club Averøykameratene. He is the elder brother of fellow Faroese international Allan Mørkøre. He is a baker by profession.

== Club career ==
A versatile midfielder or striker, he started his career at Faroese club KÍ Klaksvík and stayed there for most of his career alongside his brother Allan. Also, he teamed up with compatriot Julian Johnsson at Norwegian league side Sogndal Fotball and he played at Norwegian lower-league Skarbøvik IF. Mørkøre was Faroese league top goalscorer in the 1988 and 1996 seasons.

== International career ==
Mørkøre made his debut in an August 1988 friendly match against Iceland, the country's first FIFA-recognized match. His final match was an October 2001 World Cup qualifying match against Slovenia. He earned 37 caps, scoring 3 goals.

== International goals ==
Scores and results list Faroe Islands' goal tally first.

#	Date	Venue	Opponent	Score	Result	Competition
1	8 August 1990	Gundadalur, Tórshavn, Faroe Islands	Iceland	1-0	2-3	Friendly
2	4 February 2000	La Manga, Spain	Iceland	1-0	2-3	Friendly
3	24 March 2001	Stade Josy Barthel, Luxembourg City, Luxembourg	Luxembourg	2-0	2-0	2002 WC Qualifying
