= B36 Tórshavn =

Faroese association football club

- Full name: Bóltfelagið 1936
- Nicknames: B36; White Tigers; Hvítir
- Founded: 28 March 1936; 90 years ago
- Ground: Gundadalur Stadium, Tórshavn, Faroe Islands
- Capacity: 5,000
- Chairman: Edvard Heen
- Manager: Jákup á Borg
- League: Faroe Islands Premier League
- 2025: Faroe Islands Premier League, 5th of 10
- Website: b36.fo
Home colours	Away colours

B36 Tórshavn (Faroese: Bóltfelagið 1936 Tórshavn) is a Faroese football club based in the capital of Tórshavn, playing in the Faroe Islands Premier League, the top tier of Faroese football. B36 Tórshavn has always played its home games in Gundadalur.

Today B36 Tórshavn is among the most successful football clubs in the Faroe Islands, having won the Faroe Islands Premier League 11 times, the Faroese Cup 6 times and the Faroese Super Cup once. The club also has a women's section, which is currently in the process of rebuilding. B36 Tórshavn is one of the biggest football clubs in the Faroe Islands, and is known for playing technical and positive football. In April 2024, F.C. Copenhagen announced their partnership with B36 Tórshavn.

B36 Tórshavn is known to blend historical success, European exploits, and a youth-to-national-team pipeline.

== History ==
=== Founding ===
B36 Tórshavn was officially founded on 28 March 1936, but had already been playing matches since 1935. The capital was growing, and there was a lot of interest in football. B36 was founded by young people who wanted to play football, but had no opportunity to play for the existing club, HB Tórshavn. The initiative was taken by an entrepreneur called Niels Ejdesgaard, who became the first chairman of the new football club. When B36 was founded, they battled with local rivals for the rights to the Gundadalur Stadium, although both teams used the venue and played a number of derby matches there during that initial season. The conflict was solved by the mayor of Tórshavn, who decided that the stadium was to be shared equally between the two clubs. In 1946 the club were celebrated as national champions for the first time, and in 1965 the club won its first national cup.

=== Hard times ===
In 1962, B36 Tórshavn celebrated its fifth national championship, but dark times were to follow. The club would wait 35 years for its next national championship. To make matters worse, rival team HB Tórshavn experienced a lot of success in the same period. In the middle of the 1980s, B36 Tórshavn was relegated twice from the best division. Then in 1987, Kristian á Neystabø took over as chairman and Kjartan Mohr as cashier. They took on the task of rebuilding the club, and succeeded in making a turnaround. The results improved, and the cup was won in 1991, although the National Championship was lost in the final match that same year. Then, in 1997, the club celebrated its first national championship in 35 years. Since then, B36 Tórshavn has been five-time champions, and have won the cup three times.

=== Local rivalry ===
In the last 20–25 years, the local rivalry with HB Tórshavn has increased, and now the two clubs are about equal in strength. In 2018, the teams fought a fierce cup final, which B36 Tórshavn won on penalties, after one of the most dramatic cup finals ever at The Faroe Islands. After two red cards in the end of the match, B36 Tórshavn was playing 9 against 11 from the stoppage time in the ordinary match and through all the extended time. In the 95th minute, B36 Tórshavn equalized to 2–2 with the last shot in the ordinary match from the youngster Hannes Agnarson, and went on to keep HB Tórshavn from scoring. This 9 against 11 was a repetition of the previous years 2nd leg of the cup semi finals, where B36 Tórshavn also played with 9 men in all the extended time and about 20 minutes of the ordinary time. Despite being down with 2 men, B36 Tórshavn won the match 3–2, when club legend Róaldur Jacobsen scored from 72 meters in the last minute.

== Players sold abroad ==
Normally Faroese players who move abroad to play football are youngsters who join foreign clubs as academy players, but recently B36 Tórshavn has sold two senior players to norwegian football teams. In 2018 the Faroese international defender Odmar Færø was sold to Hamarkameratene, where he played one season. He then returned to Faroese league to play for KÍ Klaksvík. Likewise, the former Faroe Islands national under-21 football team player Meinhard Olsen was sold to Kristiansund BK in 2018. After a short spell with B36 in 2020 he again went abroad, and is now playing with Mjøndalen IF Fotball in Norway. In June 2019, he made his debut on the Faroe Islands national football team in a match against Spain.

In 2022 Martin Agnarsson was sold to the danish Superliga team Viborg FF, after the teams had met in UEFA Europa Conference League. Martin is a regular player on Faroe Islands national football team, having his debut in November 2022 in a friendly against Kosovo. He is currently playing for Mjällby AIF in the Swedish top tier.

== International players ==
B36 Tórshavn regularly delivers players to Faroese National Team. In 2026, Heini Vatnsdal and Silas Eyðsteinsson were called up for the team. Current players on The Faroese U21 National Team are Jógvan Gullfoss and Dávid B. Andreassen.

In 2023 Taufee Skandari made his debut for Afghanistan. This was the first time ever, that a non-Faroese player in the Faroese league has been selected to a national team. He had his debut in a match against Kyrgyzstan in the 2023 CAFA Nations Cup.

Former international players in the current team are: Pætur Petersen, Bogi Reinert Petersen and Hannes Agnarsson.

Hannes Agnarsson, Bogi Reinert Petersen, Bergur Poulsen, Dávid B. Andreasen, Ragnar Samuelsen, Símun Sólheim and Silas Eyðsteinsson have all played on The Faroese U21 National Team.

== European competitions ==
Clubs in the Faroe Islands first took part in European competitions in 1992, after the Faroe Islands Football Association became a member of UEFA in 1990. B36 was drawn against Avenir Beggen in the Cup Winners Cup qualifying round in 1992. They came close, but didn't make it through to the first round after a 1–0 loss and a 1–1 draw at home.

In 2005/06, the team reached the second round in the UEFA Cup after defeating ÍBV Vestmannaeyar of Iceland 3–2 on aggregate. In the second round, they narrowly lost to Danish Superliga-club FC Midtjylland 1–2 in the away leg and drew 2–2 at home. The team reached the second qualifying round of the UEFA Champions League in 2006/07 after defeating Birkirkara FC of Malta 5–2 on aggregate and were eliminated in second qualifying round of the UEFA Champions League, losing both matches to Fenerbahçe 4–0 and 5–0.

In the 2018–19 UEFA Europa League, B36 reached the second qualifying round, after defeating St Joseph's, Gibraltar on penalties in the preliminary round, after 2–2 on aggregate. The team also made it through the first qualifying round by defeating OFK Titograd from Montenegro after a 0–0 draw at home and a 2–1 victory away. In the second round, B36 Tórshavn was up against Beşiktaş Istanbul. That opposition was too strong, and the matches ended 0–2 and 0–6.

The campaign in 2020–21 Europa League was the most successful European campaign ever, where B36 became the first Faroese team to get through three rounds in an UEFA club competition. This was the year of the pandemic, so the qualifying matches in were played with one single match each round. The victories were won against St Joseph's, Gibraltar (away), Levadia Tallinn aet. at home and The New Saints after penalties at home. The opposition in the third round became a bit to strong. B36 played away, and lost 1-3 against CSKA Sofia.

In the 2022–23 Conference League B36 became the first Faroese team ever, who managed to turn a defeat away into a win on aggregate. They lost 0-2 to Borac Banja Luka, but managed to win 3-1 aet. at home and 4-3 after penalties. The campaign ended in third round, where the danish team Viborg were the opponents.

In the 2023–24 Conference League, B36 made it to the third qualifying round after victories against Paide Linnameeskond from Estonia and Haverfordwest County from Wales. In the third round the opposition from the Croat team Rijeka proved to be to strong, and B36 lost both matches.

== Current squad ==
As of 15 July 2026

Note: Flags indicate national team as defined under FIFA eligibility rules; some limited exceptions apply. Players may hold more than one non-FIFA nationality.

No.	Pos.	Nation	Player
1	GK	FRO	Silas Eyðsteinsson
3	DF	FRO	Bergur Poulsen
5	DF	FRO	Børge Petersen
7	DF	FRO	Símun Sólheim
8	MF	FRO	Ragnar Samuelsen
9	FW	FRO	Hannes Agnarsson
10	FW	SEN	Boubacar Dabo
11	FW	FRO	Pætur Petersen
12	MF	FRO	Heini Guttesen
13	MF	FRO	Dávid H. Viderø
14	MF	FRO	Jógvan Gullfoss
15	MF	FRO	Gilli Samuelsen
16	MF	FRO	Carl Mikkelsen

No.	Pos.	Nation	Player
17	MF	FRO	Jóhann H. Joensen
18	MF	FRO	Dávid B. Andreasen
19	MF	FRO	Rani í Soylu
20	MF	FRO	Djóni Sivertsen
21	FW	DEN	William Rygaard
22	DF	FRO	Bogi Reinert Petersen (captain)
23	DF	FRO	Heini Vatnsdal
24	FW	FRO	Bartal Páll Klein
25	GK	FRO	Hans Jørgensen
26	DF	FRO	Rói Hansen
27	MF	FRO	Tórur Eið Eliasen
28	DF	FRO	Mattias Weihe Joensen
30	MF	FRO	Leivur F. Guttesen

== Honours ==
- Faroe Islands Premier League: 11
  - 1946, 1948, 1950, 1959, 1962, 1997, 2001, 2005, 2011, 2014, 2015
- Faroe Islands Cup: 7
  - 1965, 1991, 2001, 2003, 2006, 2018, 2021
- Faroe Islands Super Cup: 1
  - 2007
- 1. deild: 1
  - 1985

== UEFA club competition record ==
Fully up to date as of match played 18 July 2024

=== Overview ===
Competition	Matches	W	D	L	GF	GA
UEFA Champions League	14	2	3	9	12	30
UEFA Cup / UEFA Europa League	31	4	7	20	29	70
European Cup Winners' Cup	2	0	1	1	1	2
UEFA Europa Conference League	14	4	3	7	11	18
UEFA Intertoto Cup	4	0	0	4	2	15
TOTAL	65	10	14	41	55	135

=== Matches ===
In the 2020–21 season B36 became the first Faroese team to get through three rounds of a UEFA club competition.

Season	Competition	Round	Opponent	Home	Away	Aggregate
1992–93	European Cup Winners' Cup	QR	(Luxembourg) Avenir Beggen	1–1	0–1	1–2
1997	UEFA Intertoto Cup	Group 5	(Belgium) Genk	0–5	—N/a	5th
1997	UEFA Intertoto Cup	Group 5	(Norway) Stabæk	—N/a	0–5	5th
1997	UEFA Intertoto Cup	Group 5	(Russia) Dynamo Moskva	0–1	—N/a	5th
1997	UEFA Intertoto Cup	Group 5	(Greece) Panachaiki	—N/a	2–4	5th
1998–99	UEFA Champions League	1Q	(Israel) Beitar Jerusalem	0–1	1–4	1–5
1999–2000	UEFA Cup	QR	(Turkey) Ankaragücü	0–1	0–1	0–2
2000–01	UEFA Cup	QR	(Denmark) AB	0–1	0–8	0–9
2002–03	UEFA Champions League	1Q	(Georgia (country)) Torpedo Kutaisi	0–1	2–5	2–6
2004–05	UEFA Cup	1Q	(Latvia) Liepājas Metalurgs	1–3	1–8	2–11
2005–06	UEFA Cup	1Q	(Iceland) ÍBV	2–1	1–1	3–2
2005–06	UEFA Cup	2Q	(Denmark) Midtjylland	2–2	1–2	3–4
2006–07	UEFA Champions League	1Q	(Malta) Birkirkara	2–2	3–0	5–2
2006–07	UEFA Champions League	2Q	(Turkey) Fenerbahçe	0–5	0–4	0–9
2007–08	UEFA Cup	1Q	(Lithuania) Ekranas	1–3	2–3	3–6
2008–09	UEFA Cup	1Q	(Denmark) Brøndby	0–2	0–1	0–3
2009–10	UEFA Europa League	1Q	(Georgia (country)) Olimpi Rustavi	0–2	0–2	0–4
2012–13	UEFA Champions League	1Q	(Northern Ireland) Linfield	0–0	0–0	0–0 (3–4 p)
2014–15	UEFA Europa League	1Q	(Northern Ireland) Linfield	1–2	1–1	2–3
2015–16	UEFA Champions League	1Q	(Wales) The New Saints	1–2	1–4	2–6
2016–17	UEFA Champions League	1Q	(Malta) Valletta	2–1	0–1	2–2 (a)
2017–18	UEFA Europa League	1Q	(Estonia) Nõmme Kalju	1–2	1–2	2–4
2018–19	UEFA Europa League	PR	(Gibraltar) St Joseph's	1–1	1–1	2–2, 4–2 (p)
2018–19	UEFA Europa League	1Q	(Montenegro) OFK Titograd	0–0	2–1	2–1
2018–19	UEFA Europa League	2Q	(Turkey) Beşiktaş	0–2	0–6	0–8
2019–20	UEFA Europa League	1Q	(Northern Ireland) Crusaders	2–3	0–2	2–5
2020–21	UEFA Europa League	PR	(Gibraltar) St Joseph's	—N/a	2–1	—N/a
2020–21	UEFA Europa League	1Q	(Estonia) FCI Levadia	4–3 (a.e.t.)	—N/a	—N/a
2020–21	UEFA Europa League	2Q	(Wales) The New Saints	2–2 (5–4 p)	—N/a	—N/a
2020–21	UEFA Europa League	3Q	(Bulgaria) CSKA Sofia	—N/a	1–3	—N/a
2022–23	UEFA Europa Conference League	1Q	(Bosnia and Herzegovina) Borac Banja Luka	3–1 (a.e.t.)	0–2	3–3 (4–3 p)
2022–23	UEFA Europa Conference League	2Q	(San Marino) Tre Fiori	1–0	0–0	1–0
2022–23	UEFA Europa Conference League	3Q	(Denmark) Viborg	1–2	0–3	1–5
2023–24	UEFA Europa Conference League	1Q	(Estonia) Paide Linnameeskond	0–0	2–0 (a.e.t.)	2–0
2023–24	UEFA Europa Conference League	2Q	(Wales) Haverfordwest County	2–1	1–1 (a.e.t.)	3–2
2023–24	UEFA Europa Conference League	3Q	(Croatia) Rijeka	1–3	0–2	1–5
2024–25	UEFA Conference League	1Q	(Latvia) Auda	0–1	0–2	0–3

Notes

- PR: Preliminary round
- QR: Qualifying round
- 1Q: First qualifying round
- 2Q: Second qualifying round
- 3Q: Third qualifying round

== Managers ==
- (Faroe Islands) Martin Holm (1946-47)
- (Denmark) Arne Rasmussen (1948)
- (Scotland) John Black (1953)
- (Faroe Islands) Petur Simonsen (1958)
- (Faroe Islands) Petur Simonsen (1962)
- (Denmark) Bengt Anemann (1965)
- (Faroe Islands) Jørleif Kúrberg (1966)
- (Austria) Walter Pfeiffer (1967)
- (Faroe Islands) Gunnleif Mouritsen (1968)
- (Denmark) Per From Egebjerg (1970-71)
- (Iceland) Eggert Jóhannesson (1974-75)
- (Faroe Islands) Árni Rein (1976-77)
- (Faroe Islands) Jacob Thomsen (1978)
- (Faroe Islands) Sólbjørn Mortensen (1979)
- (Scotland) Stan Mills (1980)
- (Faroe Islands) Jørleif Kúrberg (1980)
- (Faroe Islands) Jógvan Nordbúð (1981-82)
- (Faroe Islands) Jóhan Nielsen (1983-86)
- (Faroe Islands) Jógvan Nordbúð (1987-89)
- (Faroe Islands) Petur Simonsen (1990–92)
- (Poland) Jacek Burkhardt (1993–94)
- (Iceland) Páll Guðlaugsson (1994)
- (Faroe Islands) Petur Simonsen (1995)
- (Faroe Islands) Jógvan Nordbúð (1996)
- (Serbia) Tomislav Sivić (1997–99)
- (Sweden) Per Olov Andersson (2000)
- (Poland) Piotr Krakowski (2000–02)
- (Romania) Ion Geolgău (2002–03)
- (Faroe Islands) Jóannes Jakobsen (2004)
- (Faroe Islands) Sigfríður Clementsen (2005–06)
- (Faroe Islands) Kurt Mørkøre (2007)
- (Faroe Islands) Heðin Askham (2008)
- (Faroe Islands) Mikkjal Thomassen (1 Jan 2009–09)
- (Serbia) Milan Cimburović (2009)
- (Faroe Islands) Sigfríður Clementsen (2009–10)
- (Faroe Islands) Allan Mørkøre (2010)
- (Faroe Islands) John Petersen (2011)
- (Faroe Islands) Mikkjal Thomassen (2011–13)
- (Faroe Islands) Sámal Erik Hentze (2014)
- (Faroe Islands) Eyðun Klakstein (2015–16)
- (Faroe Islands) Jákup á Borg (2017–20)
- (Faroe Islands) Dan Brimsvík (2020–24)
- (Norway) Magne Hoseth (2024)
- (Faroe Islands) Jákup Martin Joensen (2024-2026)
- (Faroe Islands) Jákup á Borg (2026–)

== Notable former players ==
- (Faroe Islands) Kriss Guttesen was goalkeeper on the best team from 1946 to 1960. He won four National Champions titles with the club, and played three unofficial international matches.
- (Faroe Islands) Tórður Holm was a great athlete, who performed in several disciplines. In football he was well known as a very strong defender. He won four National Champions titles and one Cup title with the club, and played 11 unofficial international matches.
- (Faroe Islands) Baldvin Baldvinsson was a notorious goalgetter, who played for the club during the 60s and 70s. He won one National Champions title and one Cup title with the club, and played five unofficial international matches. After stopping his career as player he became one of the most respected referees in Faroese football.
- (Faroe Islands) Eiler Mouritsen was a skilled midfielder who played for the club during the 70s.
- Tummas Eli Hansen was a rock solid centre defender, who in 1997 lead the club to the first National Champions title in 35 years. He also won one Cup title with the club, and played 27 official and 4 unofficial matches for The Faroe Islands.
- Jens Kristian Hansen is the brother of Tummas Eli Hansen. He spent most of his career in B36, with shorter spella in Denmark and Scotland. He won the National Champions title and Cup title twice. On international level he played 44 matches for The Faroe Islands scoring three goals, the most famous one against Spain in a WC qualifier. He also played two unofficial international matches.
- John Petersen was a striker, who spent the best part of his career at the club, winning two National Champions titles, two Cup titles, and scoring a total of 54 goals. He was for several years the record goalscorer in Faroe Islands Premier League with 147 goals. He played 57 matches for The Faroe Islands scoring 6 goals.
- Jákup á Borg is an all-time favorite and notorious crowdpleaser in B36 Tórshavn, even though he spent four seasons with the local rivals HB Tórshavn. He won five National Champions titles with B36 and two with HB Tórshavn. In addition to this he won three Cup titles, two with B36, and one with the rivals. He scored a record total of 153 goals in the Faroe Islands Premier League, only recently beaten. He also played 61 matches for The Faroe Islands scoring 2 goals.
- Klæmint Matras also known as Mr. B36, played as a defensive midfielder, and his whole-hearted unconditional play and fighting skills made him a legend in the crowd. He captained the team during several seasons, winning four National Champions titles and three Cup titles. He is registered with 2 matches for The Faroe Islands.
- (Poland) Łukasz Cieślewicz is a Polish national who played most of his career with B36 Tórshavn. He and his family originally came to The Faroes when he was a teenager. His father, Robert Cieślewicz, was a professional footballer, who played at The Faroes for a couple of years. After a few years in Danish football, Łukasz joined the club in 2011. He immediately became one of the star players in Faroe Islands Premier League, and has won three National Champions title and one Cup title with the club. He left B36 in 2020 to join Víkingur Gøta, and in 2021 and 2022 he played for B68 Toftir. He is now retired from football.
- Róaldur Jacobsen was an attacking midfielder who played his entire career with B36. He was one of the best technical skilled players in the Faroese league, and also was an excellent freekick taker. He won three National Champions title and one Cup title with the club. On international level he has played six matches for The Faroe Islands and several U21 matches. He retired from football at 28 because of injuries.
