= Á Eiðinum =

Multi-use stadium in Vágur

Coordinates: 61°27′57″N 6°50′11″W

á Eiðinum
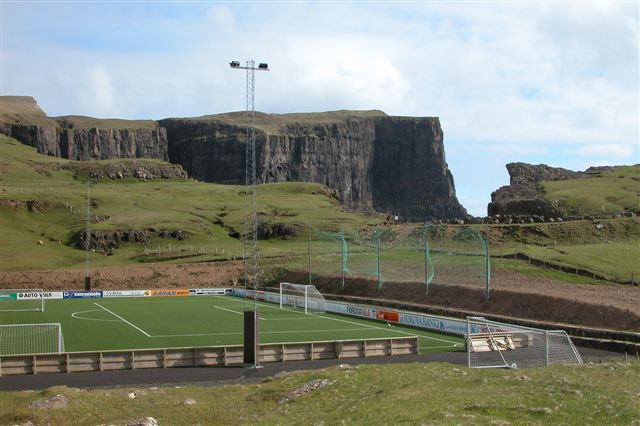
- Interactive map of á Eiðinum
- Location: Vágur, Faroe Islands
- Capacity: 3,000

Tenant
- FC Suðuroy

á Eiðinum is a multi-use stadium in Vágur, which is one of the larger villages in the southernmost island Suduroy in the Faroe Islands. It is currently used mostly for football matches and is the home ground of FC Suðuroy, formerly called VB/Sumba (until 31 Dec. 2009). The stadium holds 3,000 people, but has only 330 seats.

== Vágshøll - The Sports Hall of Vágur ==
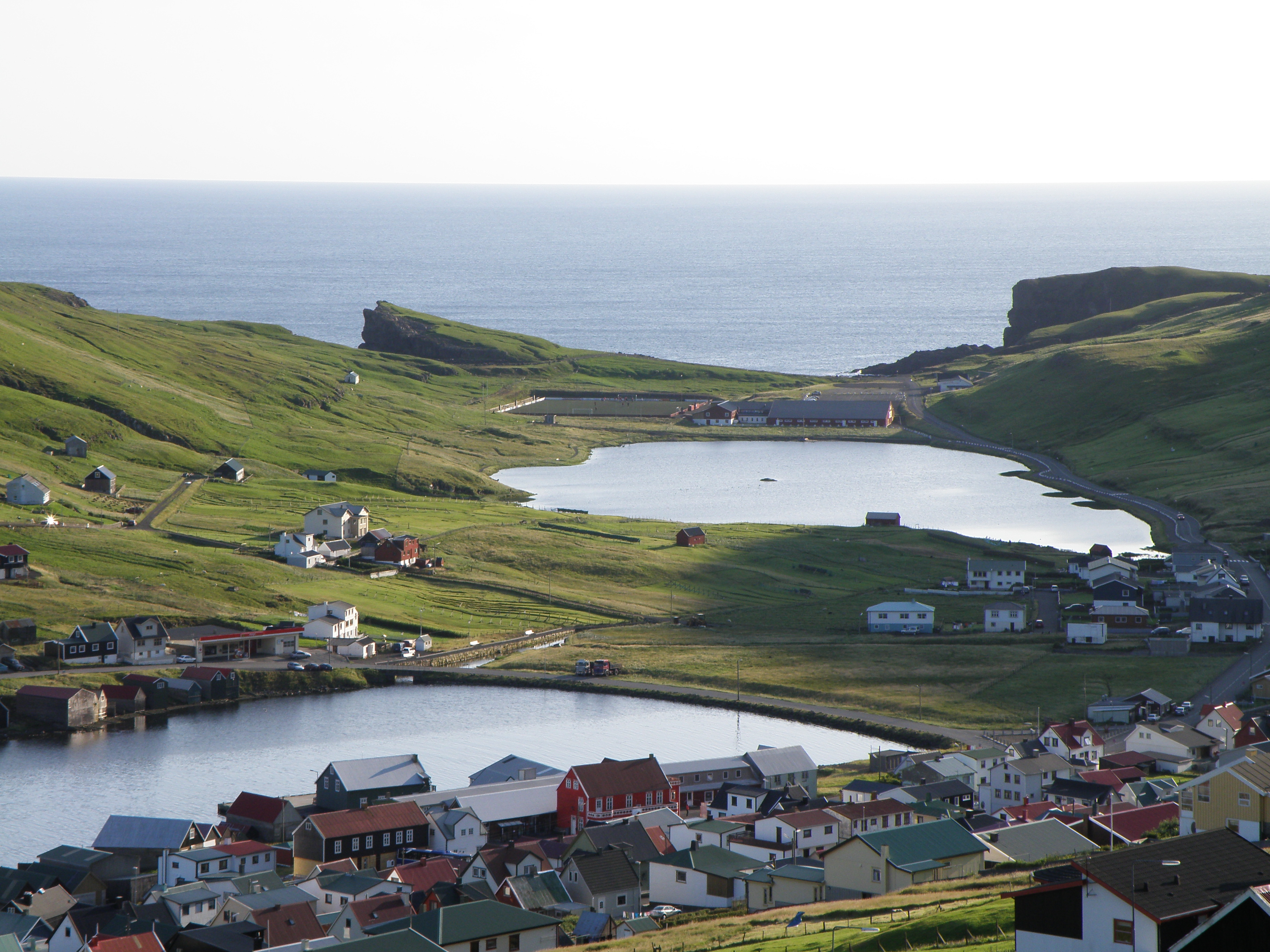
View to FC Suðuroy's Football stadium on Eiðinum in Vágur, the east coast, west coast and the lake Vatnið in between the coasts are visible.

Next to the Football Stadium on Eiðinum in Vágur is a sports hall, which is called Vágshøll. It was built in 1980. Another building next to the football stadium is a community hall which was built in 1978 and is called VB-húsið (The house of VB). VB was the first football association in Vágur, founded in 1905. VB was not the first football association in the Faroe Islands or in Suduroy. TB from Tvøroyri is even older, founded in 1892. VB got together with Sumba in 2005 and now these two teams are called FC Suðuroy. They hope that this team will be for the whole island, but TB and Royn from Hvalba have not yet accepted the invitation (March 2010).

== FC Suðuroy ==
FC Suðuroy is a result of the prior merging of VB Vágur and Sumba in 2005. FC Suðuroy was founded on January 1, 2010. Chairman of the board is Bjarni Johansen, who until the end of 2008 used to be goal keeper for VB Vágur and VB/Sumba. Chief Financial Officer for FC Suðuroy is Pól Thorsteinsson, who started his football career in Vágur for VB Vágur and ended his football career in the second best division of VB/Sumba in 2009, the same year as they won the 1. division and they decided to change the name from VB/Sumba to FC Suðuroy. In the meantime Thorsteinsson was playing for other Faroese clubs and also an Icelandic football club. Manager for FC Suðuroy is Jón Pauli Olsen.
