= Jón Pauli Olsen =

Faroese footballer and manager

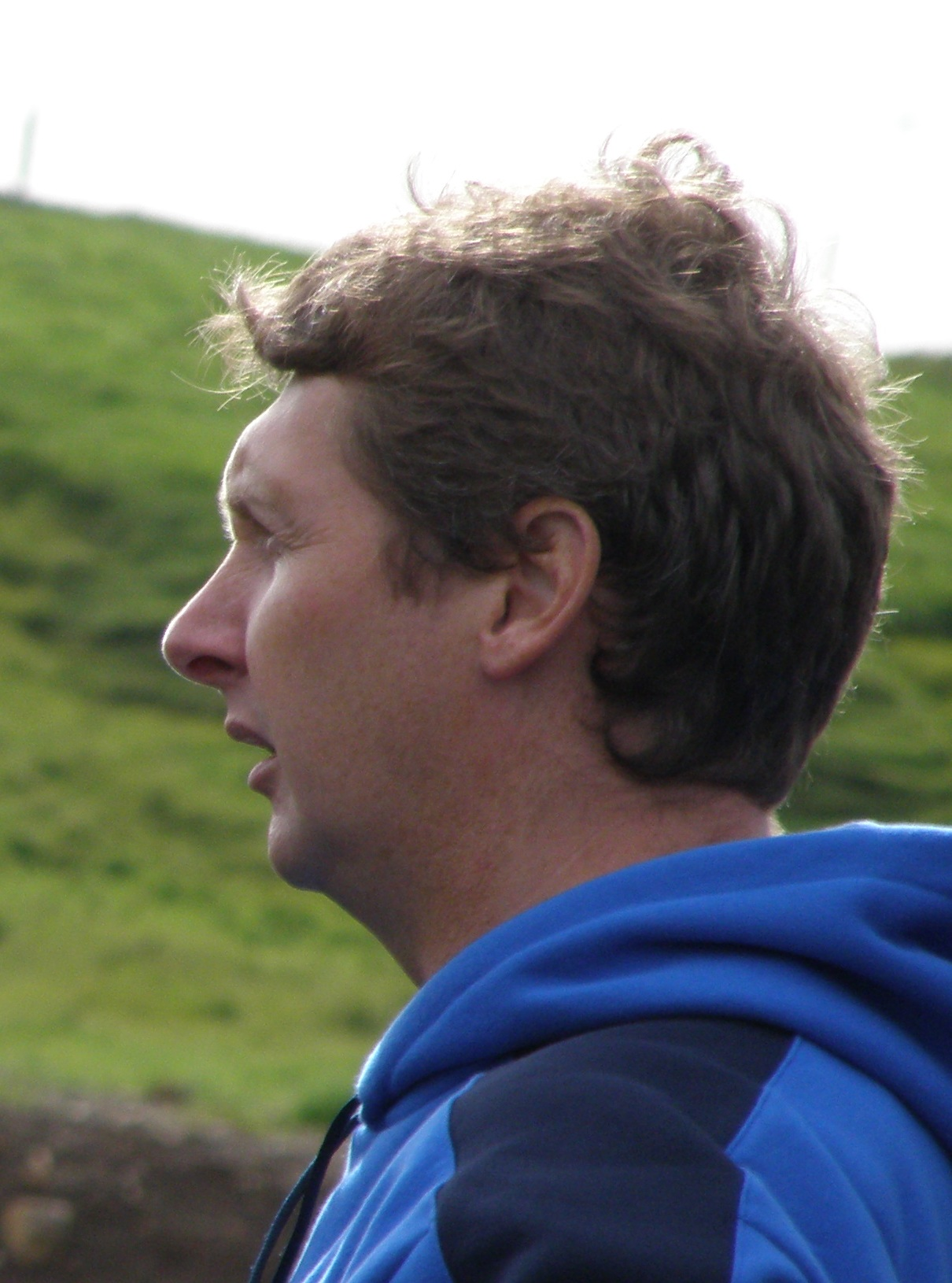
Jón Pauli Olsen

Jón Pauli Olsen (born 17 August 1968) is a former manager for the Faroe Islands women's national football team. He was also manager for the Faroe Islands Women's U17 national team. Olsen is also a former football player, he mostly played as a forward, but sometimes he played as a midfielder and sometimes as a defender. He is married to Sirið Stenberg, who is member of the Faroese parliament (Løgting).

== Career ==
=== Manager for national teams ===
Born in Vágur, Faroe Islands, Jón Pauli Olsen is currently the manager for the Faroe Islands women's national football team, he started as their head coach in September 2012. The team played a friendly match against Luxembourg on 28 November 2012. They won 6–0. In the match against Luxembourg two of the players sat a world record. For the first time a combination of parent-offspring played at the same time in a match for their country. The mother and daughter Bára Skaale Klakstein and Eyðvør Klakkstein played together from the 61st minute, when Eyðvør Klakkstein was substituted and then they played together for the rest of the match, which was half an hour. Olsen is also manager for the girls U17 national team of the Faroe Islands from April 2012

=== Manager for clubs ===
Olsen was manager of FC Suðuroy's best team in 2010 when they played in the best division. They ended as number nine and got relegated. Before 2010 the club was called VB/Sumba, Olsen was manager for VB/Sumba's first team, which played in 1. deild (the second best division) that year. They won 1. division in 2009. Olsen was also the manager for VB/Sumba in 2008. Jón Pauli Olsen started early with his career as a manager, he was only 19 years old, when he was assisting manager for one of the boy's teams of VB Vágur. In 2005 Jón Pauli Olsen was manager for a merged boys team from the island Suðuroy, it was called VB/TB (from Vágur and Tvøroyri), Olsen was manager together with Milan Cimburovic. The result was very good, they won gold. The year after Olsen was manager again for the same team and they won gold for the second time and the cup final.

=== Club career as player ===
Jón Pauli Olsen has played football with Faroese and Danish football clubs. He started his career in his home town Vágur playing with VB Vágur, which he played with until he moved to Denmark to study. In Denmark Olsen played football with Danish football clubs: KB from Copenhagen, B93 from Østerbro in Copenhagen and IF Føroyar (Ítróttarfelagið Føroyar), which is a Danish sports club in Amager founded in 1939 by Faroese ex-patriate football players living in Denmark.

== One of the most Scoring Players for VB Vágur and VB/Sumba ==
Jón Pauli Olsen is one of the top scorers for VB Vágur and VB/Sumba.

- (Faroe Islands) Jón Krosslá Poulsen has scored 59 goals until now (23 September 2010)
- (Iceland) Egill Steintórsson has scored 55 goals
- (Faroe Islands) Jan Allan Müller has scored 53 goals
- (Faroe Islands) Birgir Jørgensen has scored 53 goals
- (Faroe Islands) Jón Pauli Olsen has scored 52 goals
- (Faroe Islands) Pól Thorsteinsson has scored 50 goals
- (Faroe Islands) Dan Djurhuus has scored 42 goals.
