= Símun Samuelsen =

Faroese footballer and coach

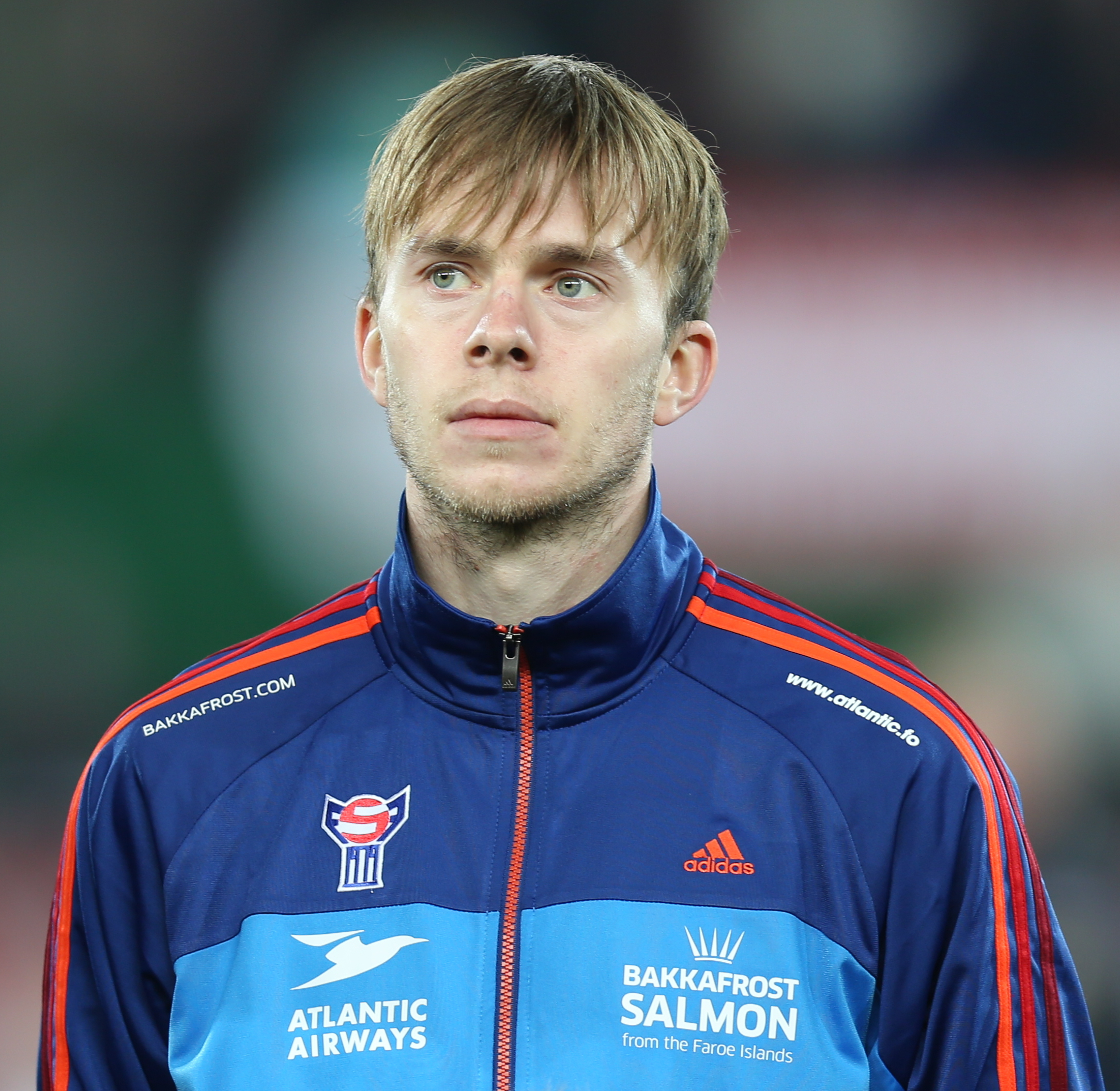

Personal information
- Full name: Símun Eiler Samuelsen
- Date of birth: 21 May 1985 (age 41)
- Place of birth: Vágur, Faroe Islands
- Position: Winger

Team information
- Current team: AB Argir (head coach)

Senior career*
Years	Team	Apps	(Gls)
2001–2002	VB Vágur	20	(3)
2003	GÍ Gøta	26	(5)
2004–2005	VB/Sumba	27	(7)
2005–2007	Keflavik	35	(10)
2007	Notodden FK	8	(2)
2008–2009	Keflavik	39	(9)
2010–2015	HB Tórshavn	117	(34)
2015	FC Suðuroy	8	(0)
2016	AB Argir	19	(3)
2017–2019	HB Tórshavn	70	(16)

International career
2003–2013	Faroe Islands	44	(1)

Managerial career
- 2020–: AB Argir
- * Club domestic league appearances and goals

Símun Samuelsen (born 21 May 1985) is a Faroese former football striker who played as a right or left winger and current head coach of AB Argir.

== Career ==
=== Club career ===
He made his debut in Faroe Islands Premier League Football with VB Vágur in the 2001 season, playing 3 games. After four more seasons at home, Samuelsen moved to Icelandic side Keflavík ÍF and in August 2007 went on loan to Norwegian First Division side Notodden FK. He is currently back playing for HB Tórshavn. On 20 July 2010 he scored a goal for HB Tórshavn in the UEFA Champions League match against FC Red Bull Salzburg, the match was played in Tórshavn. HB Tórshavn lost the first match against FC Red Bull Salzburg 5–0.

=== International career ===
Samuelsen made his debut for the Faroe Islands in an April 2003 friendly match against Kazakhstan. He has collected 44 caps since, and scored one goal.

=== Coaching career ===
Retiring at the end of 2019, Samuelsen was appointed head coach of his former club, AB Argir, on 26 March 2020.

== International goals ==
Scores and results list Faroe Islands' goal tally first.

#	Date	Venue	Opponent	Score	Result	Competition
1	8 October 2005	Ramat Gan Stadium, Ramat Gan, Israel	Israel	1–2	1–2	2006 WC Qualifying

== Individual honours ==
- Effodeildin Team of the Season: 2012, 2013
