= Pól Thorsteinsson =

Faroese footballer

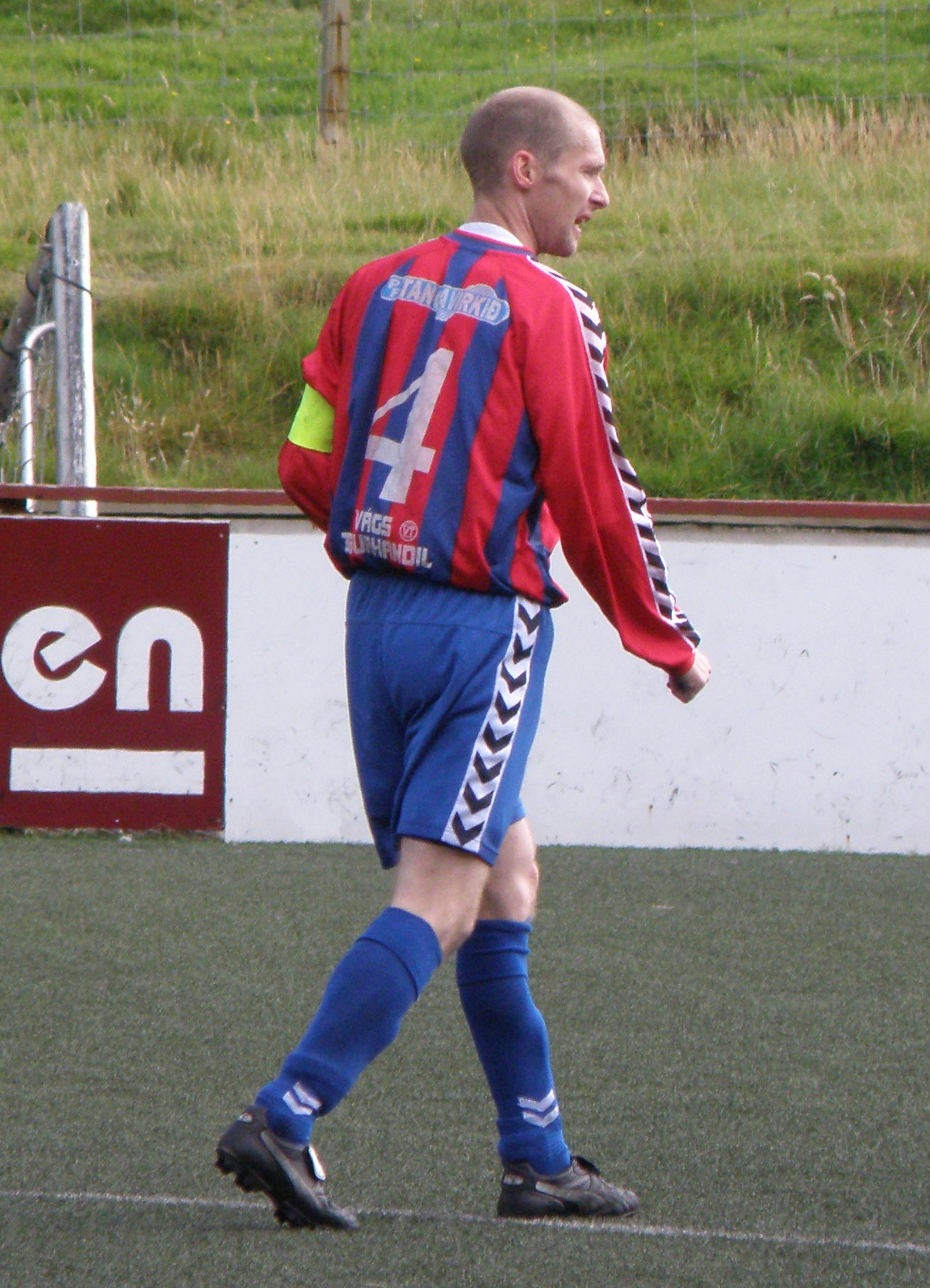

Personal information
- Date of birth: 17 November 1973 (age 52)
- Place of birth: Vágur, Faroe Islands
- Height: 1.75 m (5 ft 9 in)
- Position: Defender

Senior career*
Years	Team	Apps	(Gls)
1991–1994	VB	100	(23)
1995	Sumba/VB	20	(4)
1996	OB	?	(?)
1996–1997	VB	13	(10)
1998–1999	B36 Tórshavn	35	(0)
2000	Valur	18	(?)
2001	B36 Tórshavn	12	(1)
2002	NSÍ	15	(0)
2003–05	B36 Tórshavn	57	(0)
2006–07	NSÍ	41	(0)
2008–09	VB/Sumba	48	(13)
2010–2014	FC Suðuroy	11	(0)
2010–2014	→ FC Suðuroy II	36	(11)

International career^{‡}
1997–2004	Faroe Islands	37	(0)
- * Club domestic league appearances and goals as of 29 November 2012 ‡ National team caps and goals as of 29 November 2012

Pól Thorsteinsson (born 17 November 1973 in Vágur, Suðuroy) is a retired Faroese football player. He has been spent most of his career in the Faroe Islands, while he had brief stints in Iceland and Denmark. At the end of his career Pól Thorsteinsson played with VB/Sumba, who won the Faroese 1. division; in 2010 they changed their name to FC Suðuroy, and the team will be playing in the best division Vodafonedeildin, but Pól Thorsteinsson decided to end his football career at the end of the 2009 season. He has been capped for the Faroe Islands at senior level.

== Football career ==
=== International Football career ===
Pól Thorsteinsson has played 37 matches with the Faroe Islands national football team in the period 1997 to 2004. He played as a defender.

=== Club career ===
- VB Vágur and Sumba/VB 1991-1996
- OB Odense 1996 (he played for the second best team)
- VB Vágur1997
- B36 1998-99
- Valur, Iceland 2000
- B36 2001
- NSÍ 2002
- B36 2003-2005
- NSÍ 2006-2007
- VB/Sumba 2008-2009

=== Faroe Islands Cup - Løgmanssteypið ===
Pól Thorsteinsson has won the Løgmanssteypið, the Faroe Islands Cup, three times: 2001 with B36, 2002 with NSÍ and 2003 with B36.

=== Winner of The National Faroese Championship ===
Three times Thorsteinsson has won the National Championship: 2001 and 2005 with B36 and 2007 with NSÍ.

=== Top Scorer for VB Vágur ===
In 2009 Thorsteinsson scored his 50th goal for VB/Sumba (prior to 2005 it was just called VB, since 1 Jan 2010 the team is called FC Suðuroy). He was top scorer for this team in 1993 (6 goals), 1994 (12 goals) and 1997 (10 goals).

== Board Member of FC Suðuroy ==
Thorsteinsson has stopped playing football in the best division; he played with VB/Sumba in the first division in 2009 and they won the division. The team changed its name from 1 January 2010, now it is called FC Suðuroy and in 2010 it will play in the best division in Faroese football, which currently (2010) is called Vodafonedeildin. Thorsteinsson is chief financial officer for FC Suðuroy. Chairman for FC Suðuroy is Bjarni Johansen.
