= Jan Allan Müller =

Faroese footballer (born 1969)

Personal information
- Full name: Jan Allan Müller
- Date of birth: 25 July 1969 (age 57)
- Place of birth: Faroe Islands
- Position: Striker

Senior career*
Years	Team	Apps	(Gls)
1987–1992	VB Vágur	88	(38)
1990–1991	Go Ahead Eagles	5	(0)
1994	HB Tórshavn	9	(7)
1994–1995	Horsens		(14)
1995	VB/Sumba	12	(11)
1995–1998	Esbjerg	60	(16)
1997	VB Vágur	3	(0)
1998–1999	Svendborg		(2)
1999	KÍ Klaksvík	6	(2)

International career^{‡}
1988–1998	Faroe Islands	34	(4)
- * Club domestic league appearances and goals as of 29 November 2012 ‡ National team caps and goals as of 25 February 2012

Jan Allan Müller (born 25 July 1969) is a Faroese retired football striker.

== Club career ==
He grew up in Vágur, where he played football for VB Vágur (now called FC Suðuroy). In October 1990 he had a trial at Dutch club Go Ahead Eagles earning him a first professional contract. Later Müller moved to Denmark to play professional football, he played for the Danish clubs AC Horsens, Esbjerg fB and Svendborg fB. He had to retire early from professional football due to injuries.

== International career ==
He was a member of the Faroe Islands national football team from 1988 to 1998. He played 34 matches, scoring 4 goals and has represented his country in 13 FIFA World Cup qualification matches.

== International goals ==
Scores and results list Faroe Islands' goal tally first.

#	Date	Venue	Opponent	Score	Result	Competition
1	12 October 1994	Hampden Park, Glasgow, Scotland	Scotland	5–1	5–1	1996 UEFA Euro Qualifying
2	31 August 1996	Svangaskarð, Toftir, Faroe Islands	Slovakia	1–1	1–2	1998 WC Qualifying
3	6 October 1996	Svangaskarð, Toftir, Faroe Islands	FR Yugoslavia	1–2	1–8	1998 WC Qualifying
4	6 August 1997	Ülikooli staadion, Tartu, Estonia	Estonia	2–0	2–0	Friendly
