= Klakstein =

Klakstein is a Faroese surname. Notable people with the surname include:

- Bára Klakstein (born 1954), Faroese football coach and former footballer
- Eyðun Klakstein (born 1972), Faroese football coach and former footballer
- Eyðvør Klakstein (born 1995), Faroese footballer
