= FC Suðuroy =

Faroese football club

Suðuroy
- Full name: Football Club Suðuroy
- Founded: 2005; 21 years ago (as VB/Sumba); 2010; 16 years ago (as FC Suðuroy)
- Ground: á Eiðinum; Vágur, Faroe Islands
- Capacity: 3,000
- Chairman: Eyðbjørn Thomsen
- Manager: Pól Thorsteinsson
- League: 1. deild
- 2025: Faroe Islands Premier League, 9th of 10 (relegated)
- Website: http://fcsuduroy.com/
Home colours	Away colours

FC Suðuroy is a Faroese professional football club which was founded in January 2010 and consists of the former clubs VB (founded in 1905) and Sumba (founded in 1949), which merged in 2005 to form VB/Sumba. FC Suðuroy's competes in the 1. deild since 2024. It plays home games at the á Eiðinum Stadium in Vágur.

== History ==
VB/Sumba played in 1. deild (1. division, which is the second tier) in 2009 and won the division. FC Suðuroy therefore played their first season in the Faroe Islands Premier League, which was called Vodafonedeildin from 2009 to 2011. FC Suðuroy played their first league match on 1 April 2010 against the champions HB Tórshavn. The result was 4–4. FC Suðuroy didn't make it in Vodafonedeildin, they were relegated and played in 1. deild in 2011. They won the division with 70 points and were promoted to Effodeildin along with TB Tvøroyri, which is a club from the same island, Suðuroy.

After the end of the 2016 season it was decided on 15 December 2016 that the three clubs of the island Suðuroy, which are TB Tvøroyri, FC Suðuroy and Royn Hvalba would join for the 2017 season for the men's teams. They played as TB/FC Suðuroy/Royn. The three clubs continued separately for the children's and women's teams. In 2017 and 2018 it was only the men's teams which were playing for the new cooperation. In Faroese the team was referred to as Suðuroyarliðið or Suðringar (the Suðuroy-team). The first head coach for the Suðuroy-team was Glen Ståhl.

The cooperation ended after the 2018 season. FC Suðuroy played in the 2 division for two seasons. At the end of the 2020 season they won promotion to the 1. deild, the second best division.

== Honours ==
- 1. deild: 1

2011.

== Current squad ==
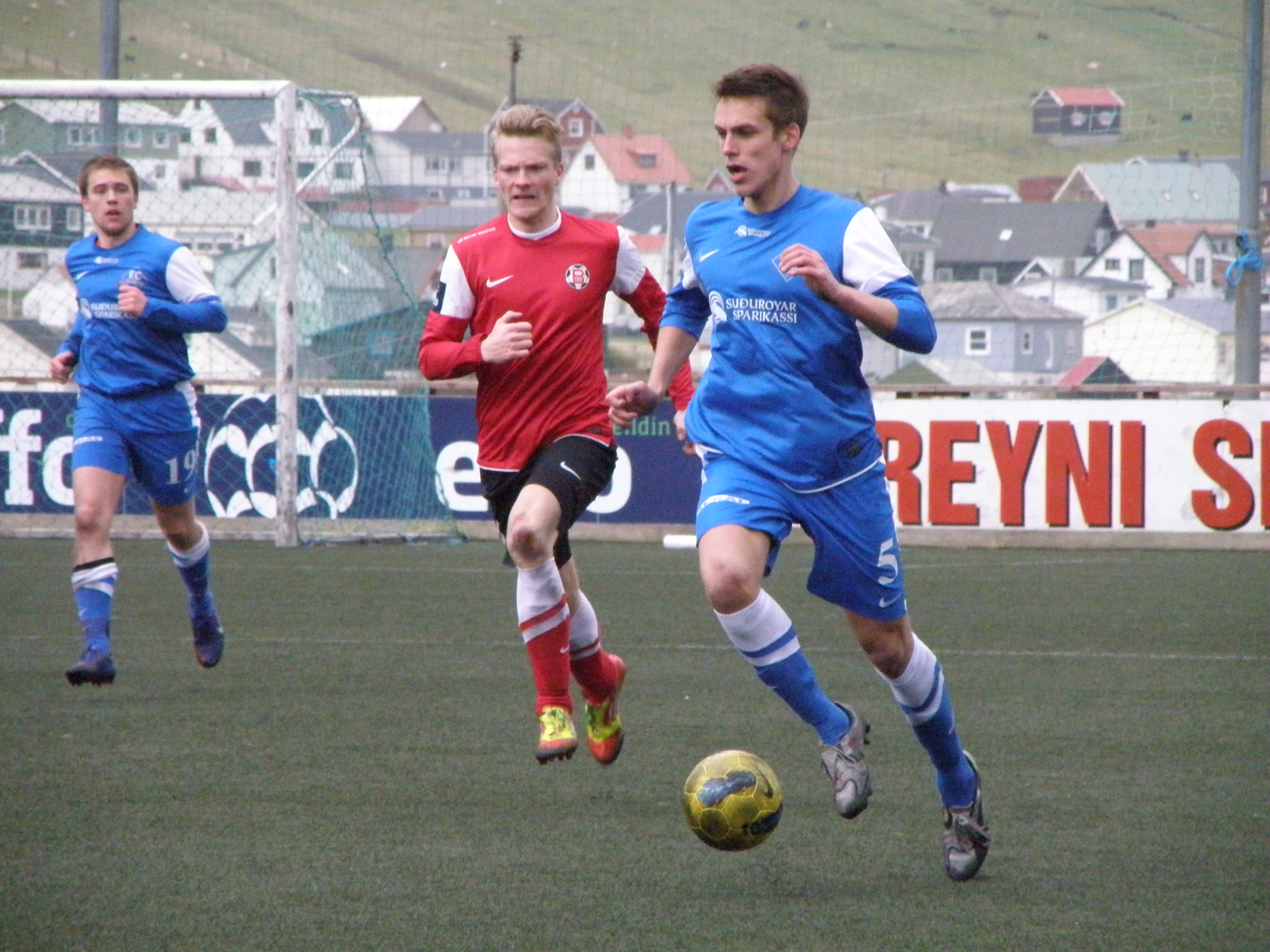
FC Suðuroy vs B68 Toftir in Effodeildin on 21 April 2012.

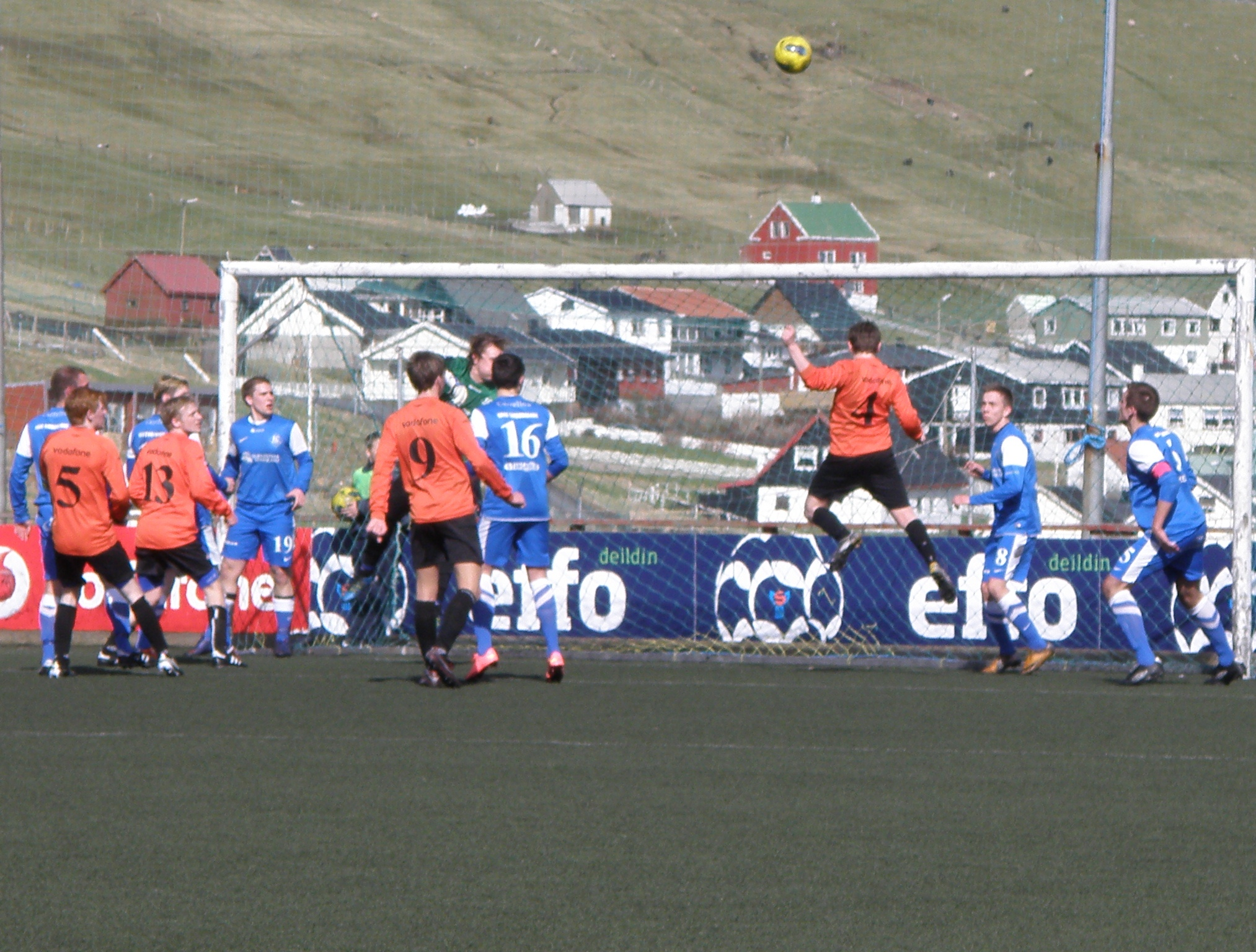
FC Suðuroy vs Skála ÍF in the 2012 Faroe Islands Cup

As of 1 May 2025

Note: Flags indicate national team as defined under FIFA eligibility rules; some limited exceptions apply. Players may hold more than one non-FIFA nationality.

No.	Pos.	Nation	Player
1	GK	FRO	Rasmus Olsen
2	DF	FRO	Bjartmar Holm
3	MF	FRO	Ari Joensen
4	DF	USA	Hunter Bell
5	DF	FRO	Olaf Godtfred
6	DF	NGR	Jimmy Abdul
7	MF	FRO	Alexander Kilgour
9	MF	FRO	Teit Hjelm
10	MF	FRO	Salmundur Bech
11	MF	FRO	Pætur Augustinussen (Captain)
12	FW	FRO	Fríði Holm

No.	Pos.	Nation	Player
14	FW	GHA	Eliasu Amin Champong
15	DF	FRO	Frans á Løgmansbø
16	MF	FRO	Dánjal Godtfred
17	DF	FRO	Jákup Tawfik Joensen
18	DF	FRO	Jónas Toftum
19	MF	FRO	John Villi Leo
20	MF	GHA	Emmanuel Owusu Andorful
21	GK	FRO	Jónas Thomsen
22	MF	FRO	Olivur Thomsen
23	DF	FRO	Janus Augustinussen
24	GK	FRO	Tróndur Sjúrdarson

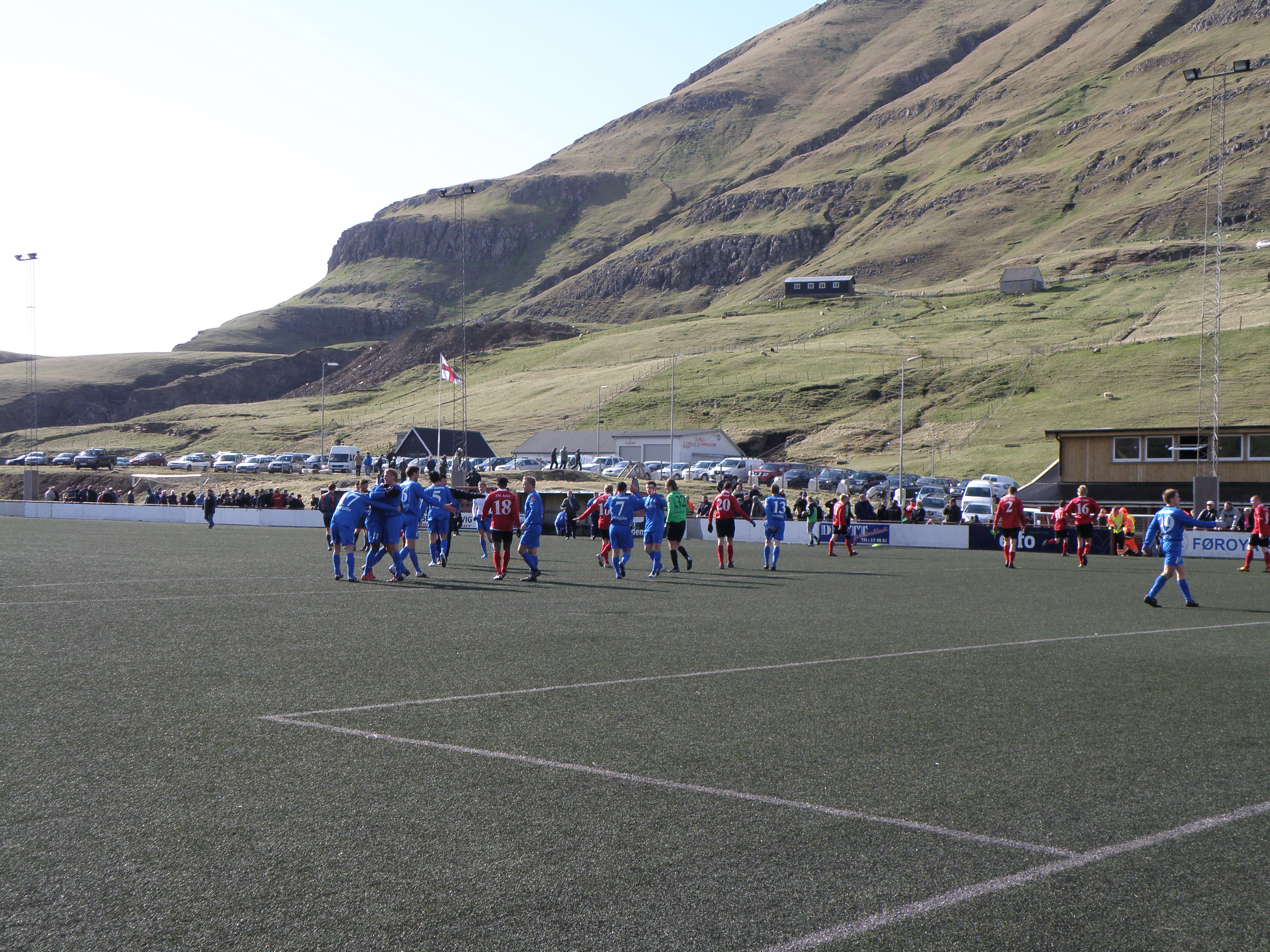
FC Suðuroy – B68 Toftir, Vodafonedeildin April 2010, result: 3–1 to FC Suðuroy

== Notable former players for VB Vágur, Sumba/VB, and VB/Sumba ==
Players who have played for national teams or for fully pro clubs.

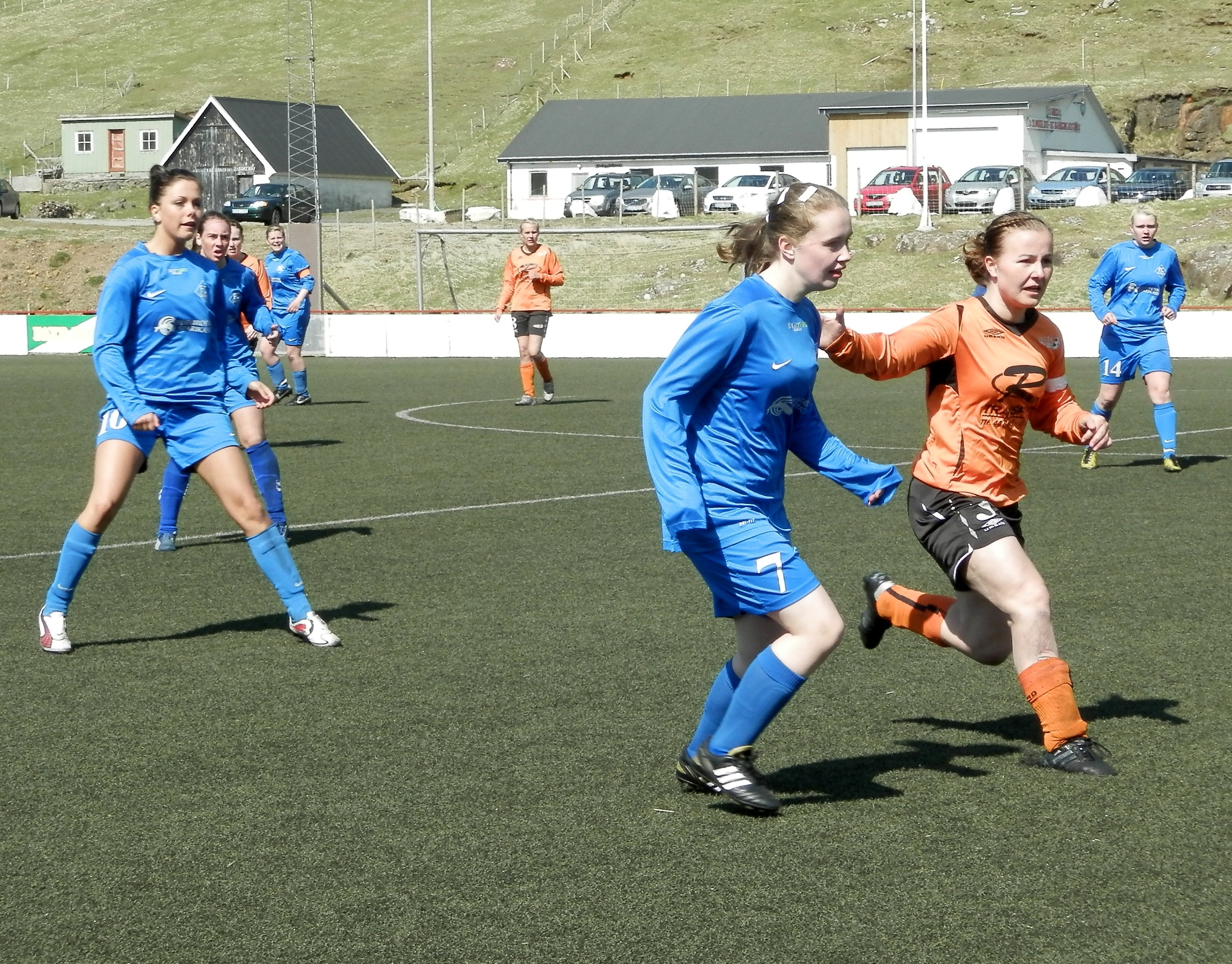
Female football 2012: FC Suðuroy vs. Skála ÍF.

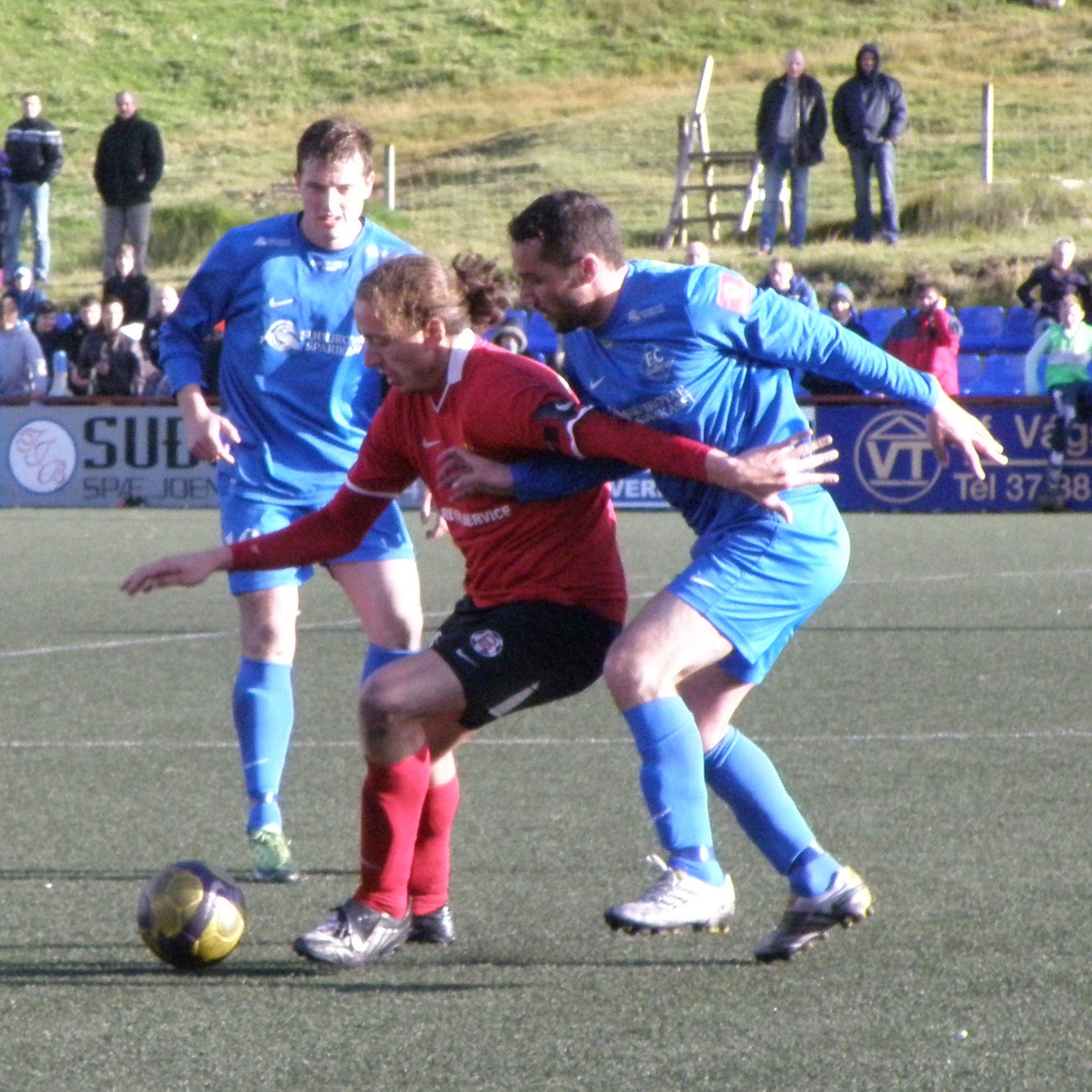
Two FC Suðuroy players: Jón Krosslá Poulsen and Mamuka Toronjadze and one B68 Toftir player on 2 October 2010. FC Suðuroy won the match 2–1.

- (Faroe Islands) Jóannes Jakobsen
- (Faroe Islands) Bjarni Johansen
- (Faroe Islands) Jan Allan Müller
- (Faroe Islands) Rúni Nolsøe
- (Faroe Islands) Jón Pauli Olsen
- (Faroe Islands) Símun Samuelsen
- (Faroe Islands) Pól Thorsteinsson
- (Faroe Islands) Heini Vatnsdal
- (Nigeria) Obi Ikechukwu Charles
- (Poland) Krzysztof Popczyński
- (Serbia) Milan Milanović
- (Slovenia) Saša Kolman
- (Slovenia) Stanislav Kuzma

== Managers of FC Suðuroy ==
- (Faroe Islands) Jón Pauli Olsen (2010–11)
- (Faroe Islands) Pól F. Joensen (2011 – May 22, 2012)
- (Faroe Islands) Tórður Wiberg Holm, (Faroe Islands) Bogi Mortensen and (Iceland) Egill Steinþórsson (interim) (May 22, 2012 – May 29, 2012)
- (Slovenia) Saša Kolman (May 29, 2012 – Oct 31, 2012)
- (Faroe Islands) Jón Johannesen (13 Nov 2012– 22 July 2014)
- (Faroe Islands) Jón Pauli Olsen (1 August 2014)
- (Faroe Islands) Sigfríður Clementsen (2018)
- (Faroe Islands) Palli Augustinussen (2019 – 2022)
- (Faroe Islands) Pól Thorsteinsson (2023 –)

== Chairmen of FC Suðuroy ==
- (Faroe Islands) Bjarni Johansen (2010–11)
- (Faroe Islands) Julius Vest Joensen (2011-2021)
- (Faroe Islands) Dennis Holm (2022)
- (Faroe Islands) Eyðbjørn Thomsen (2023-)

== See also ==
- List of football clubs in the Faroe Islands
