= Stanislav Kuzma =

Slovenian footballer (born 1976)

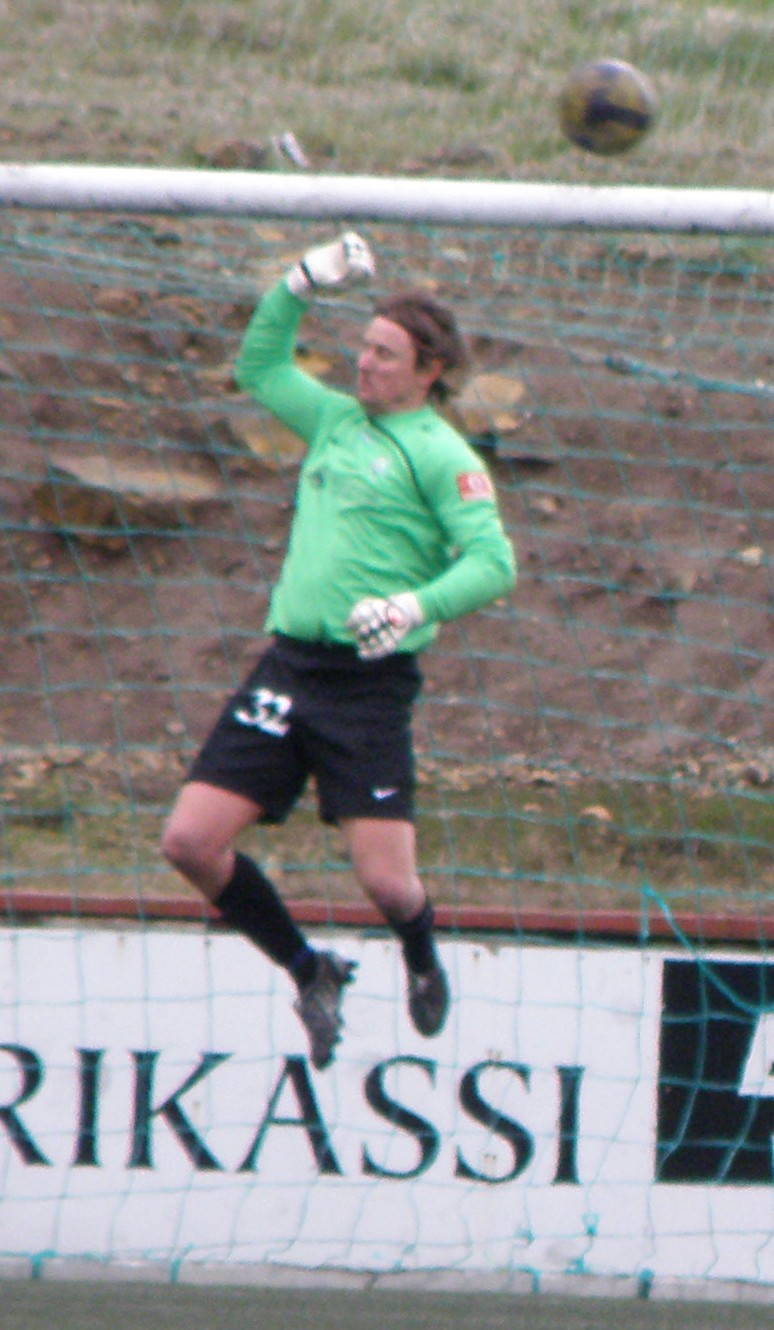
- Kuzma while playing for Suðuroy

Personal information
- Date of birth: 16 September 1976 (age 50)
- Height: 1.90 m (6 ft 3 in)
- Position: Goalkeeper

Senior career*
Years	Team	Apps	(Gls)
1993–2000	Beltinci	88	(0)
2000–2002	Korotan Prevalje	66	(0)
2002–2005	Maribor	46	(0)
2005–2009	Nafta Lendava	87	(0)
2009	Olympiakos Nicosia		
2010–2012	Suðuroy	76	(1)
2013–2014	Ljutomer	30	(0)
2015	SV Sturm Klöch	13	(0)
2015–2017	Beltinci	41	(0)
2017	SV Sturm Klöch	0	(0)
- * Club domestic league appearances and goals

Stanislav Kűzma (born 16 September 1976) is a Slovenian former professional footballer who played as a goalkeeper. He played for clubs in Cyprus, in the Faroe Islands, in Austria and in his homeland Slovenia.

== Controversies ==
Kuzma was allegedly involved in the betting scandal that was being investigated by the authorities in Slovenia and Germany. The Slovenian media were speculating that the main reason why Kuzma played in the Faroe Islands between 2010 and 2012 was that the islands are not part of the European Union.
