= Bjarni Johansen =

Faroese politician and former footballer

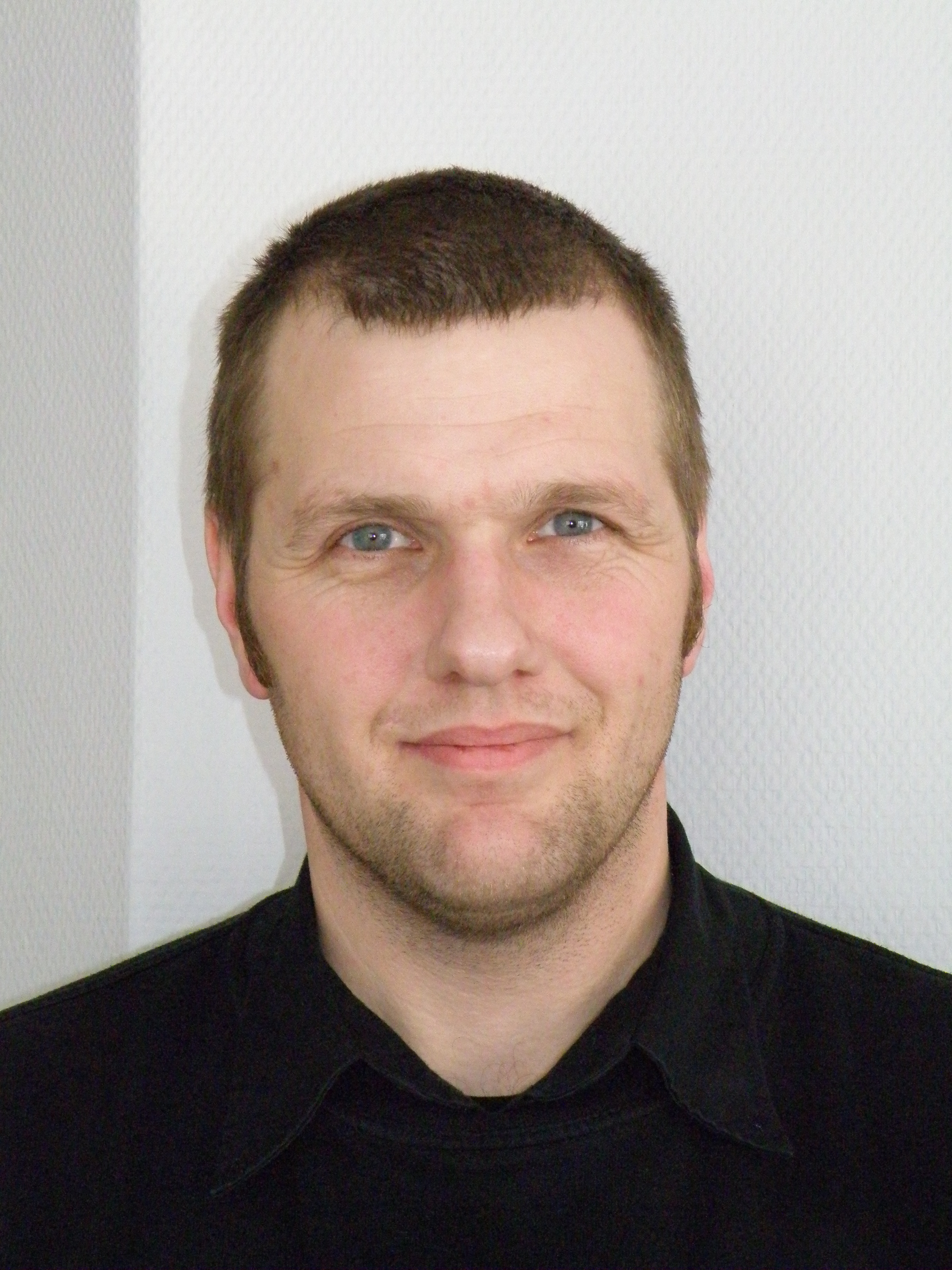
- Bjarni Johansen, Chairman for FC Suðuroy

Personal information
- Date of birth: 26 May 1971 (age 55)
- Place of birth: Denmark
- Position: Goalkeeper

Youth career
- VB Vágur

Senior career*
Years	Team	Apps	(Gls)
1991–94	VB Vágur	65	(0)
1993	IK Skovbakken		
1995	Sumba/VB	27	(1)
1996–2004	VB/Sumba	233	(0)
2005–2008	VB/Sumba	56	(0)
2008	EB/Streymur	0	(0)
2010–2014	FC Suðuroy II	32	(6)

International career^{‡}
1993–1997	Faroe Islands	2	(0)
- * Club domestic league appearances and goals as of 1 October 2014 ‡ National team caps and goals as of 1 October 2010

Bjarni Johansen (born 26 May 1971) is a Faroese politician and former goal keeper. He is the current mayor of Vágur Municipality, elected for the Social Democratic Party in November 2020 to the Municipality and became mayor from 1 January 2021. He is former chairman for the Faroese football association FC Suðuroy.

== Mayor of Vágur ==
Bjarni Johansen has served as the mayor of Vágur Municipality since 1 January 2021, after being elected in the municipal elections held in November 2020. As mayor, he represents the Social Democratic Party (Javnaðarflokkurin) and is responsible for overseeing local government functions and municipal services in Vágur, which is the main town on the island of Suðuroy in the Faroe Islands. His leadership focuses on community development, infrastructure, and promoting cultural and sporting activities in the municipality.

== Chairman for FC Suðuroy ==
FC Suðuroy was founded on 1 January 2010. FC Suðuroy is named after the island Suðuroy and consists of the former VB/Sumba, which was founded in 2005. VB/Sumba was a merger between the former football teams VB Vágur and Sumba. VB/Sumba was the winner of the 1. Division in Faroese football in 2009 and therefore the new team FC Suðuroy will be playing in the best division in Faroese football Vodafonedeildin in 2010. Bjarni Johansen has been the chairman for FC Suðuroy and VB/Sumba since 26 February 2007.

== Club career ==
- VB Vágur 1978–1992
- IK Skovbakken 1993
- VB Vágur and VB/Sumba 1994–2005
- VB Vágur 2008
- EB/Streymur 2008
- FC Suðuroy 2010 (2. Deild)

Bjarni Johansen has played most matches with VB Vágur and (after the merging with Sumba) VB/Sumba. Bjarni Johansen started to play football with VB Vágur when he was 7 years old. The first years he played as a regular player. He started as a goal keeper for VB Vágur when he was 10–12 years old. Johansen played his first match with VB Vágur's best division when he was 16; the match was against NSÍ Runavík and the result was 1–1. In 1993 Johansen lived in Denmark, he played with IK Skovbakken that year. In the period 1994-2005 Bjarni Johansen played all the matches for VB Vágur and VB/Sumba for the club's best division. He holds the Faroese record as the player who has played most matches in a row in Faroese football. VB/Sumba was re-established in 2010; now it is called FC Suðuroy. Bjarni Johansen is the chairman for FC Suðuroy.

=== Goal Keeper of the Year ===
Bjarni Johansen won the title Goal Keeper of the Year in 2000, 2001 and 2004. In 2001 and 2002 it was the Famous Faroese goal keeper Jens Martin Knudsen who won the title Goal Keeper of the Year.

=== Goal Keeper for VB Vágur and VB/Sumba ===
Bjarni Johansen started his football career early, he has been goal keeper for VB Vágur since he was a young boy and after the merging of VB Vágur and Sumba, Faroe Islands in 2005 he continued to be goal keeper for VB/Sumba until the end of the football season 2008.

=== Most Consecutive Matches Played ===
Bjarni Johansen is the player who played most football matches in a row in Faroese football. He played all the football matches for VB Vágur and VB Sumba from the start of 1994 season until the end of 2005 season. At the same time he took the record as the player who played most football matches in Faroese football in a row ever.

== International football career ==
Bjarni Johansen has been on the Faroe Islands national football team in the period 1993–1997. Most of the time he was the extra goal keeper. He played two matches for the team as goal keeper.

=== UEFA Champions League and UEFA Intertoto Cup ===
- Bjarni Johansen played his first UEFA football match on 20 June 1998 for his club VB Vágur against FC Brno in the UEFA Intertoto Cup. The result was 3–0 to FC Brno.
- In 2001 Bjarni Johansen played two matches with VB Vágur against FC Slavia Mozyr. It was in the 1st qualifying round of the UEFA Champions League. The results were 0-0 an 0-5 (Slavia Mozyr won the 2nd leg). VB Vágur was the winner of the best Faroese football division in 2000, which qualified the team for the 1st qualifying round of the Champions League.
- In 2009 Bjarni Johansen was the extra goal keeper in two matches in UEFA Champions League for EB/Streymur, which played two matches against Apoel FC from Cyprus. EB/Streymur asked Bjarni Johansen to be their extra goal keeper, because one of their goal keepers was injured just then.

== UEFA B License to Coach ==
Bjarni Johansen has UEFA B License to Coach.
