= Bára Klakstein =

Faroese footballer (born 1973)

Personal information
- Full name: Bára Skaale Klakstein
- Birth name: Bára Skaale
- Date of birth: 24 March 1973 (age 53)
- Place of birth: Klaksvík, Faroe Islands
- Height: 1.63 m (5 ft 4 in)
- Position: Defender

Senior career*
Years	Team	Apps	(Gls)
1987–2016	KÍ	287	(48)

International career
1996–2013	Faroe Islands	20	(0)
- * Club domestic league appearances and goals

Bára Skaale Klakstein (née Skaale; born 24 March 1973) is a Faroese football coach and former defender. She was a member of the Faroe Islands women's national team between 1996 and 2013, winning 20 caps. She is the mother of fellow Faroe Islands international player Eyðvør Klakstein and they played together in the senior national team in 2012 and 2013. They became the first parent-offspring combination to play together in a national team in football. The Faroe Islands Football Association (FSF) has described Klakstein as one of the most important figures in the history of Faroese women's football.

== Football ==
=== Club career ===
Klakstein debuted for KÍ Klaksvík in 1987 and played until 2016, making 287 1. deild kvinnur appearances and 39 in the UEFA Women's Champions League (formerly known as the UEFA Women's Cup).

In September 2010 she played top level football alongside her daughter Eyðvør Klakstein for the first time, when both were included in the KÍ starting line-up for a 2–0 win at Skála on Eyðvør's 15th birthday.

=== International career ===
Klakstein won her first cap for Faroe Islands women's national football team on 25 May 1996, in a 3–0 1997 UEFA Women's Championship qualification defeat by Scotland at Svangaskarð in Toftir.

She participated in the Faroe Islands' winning teams at the 2001 and 2003 editions of the Island Games, serving as captain at the latter.

The Faroe Islands Football Association (FSF) relaunched their senior women's national team in 2004 after an eight-year hiatus. Klakstein played in their first match, a 2–1 friendly defeat by Ireland. The match was staged in Klaksvík on 12 October 2004, the day before the nations' senior men's teams met at Lansdowne Road, Dublin.

In November 2012 Klakstein came to notice when she became the first parent to play alongside their son or daughter in an international football match. Bára started the 6–0 friendly win over Luxembourg, while her 17-year-old debutante daughter Eyðvør substituted in after 61 minutes.

The Klaksteins played together on three further occasions during the 2015 FIFA Women's World Cup qualification – UEFA preliminary round. The duo "stood out" as the Faroe Islands qualified from the group, the first time the nation had progressed from any stage at any level of football.

=== Coaching career ===
In 1995 Klakstein did not play for KÍ Klaksvík, but coached the team instead. She later became involved in coaching the Faroe Islands' youth female national teams, working as an assistant to Jón Pauli Olsen with the Faroe Islands women's national under-17 football team from April 2012. In January 2016 she was appointed as the new head coach of the under-15 girls' national team.

== Handball ==
Klakstein was also an accomplished handballer. She played on the right wing for Stjørnan and the Faroe Islands women's national handball team.

== Personal life ==
Bára's husband Eyðun, their son Heðin, and daughter Eyðvør, have all played football for KÍ. In 2015 UEFA included them on a list entitled "Europe's ultimate footballing families". The Norðlýsið newspaper compared them to other prominent football families in an article headlined: "The Shanklys, The Maldinis, The Laudrups, The Charltons and The Klaksteins".
