= Vágur =

Vágur Våg (Danish)
- Municipality and village
- Vágur Municipality; Vágs kommuna (Faroese)
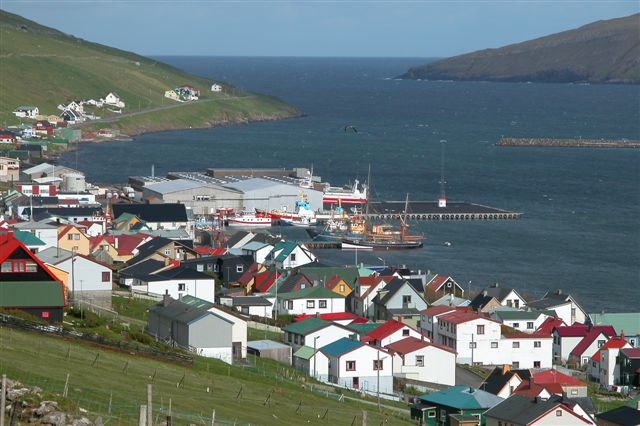

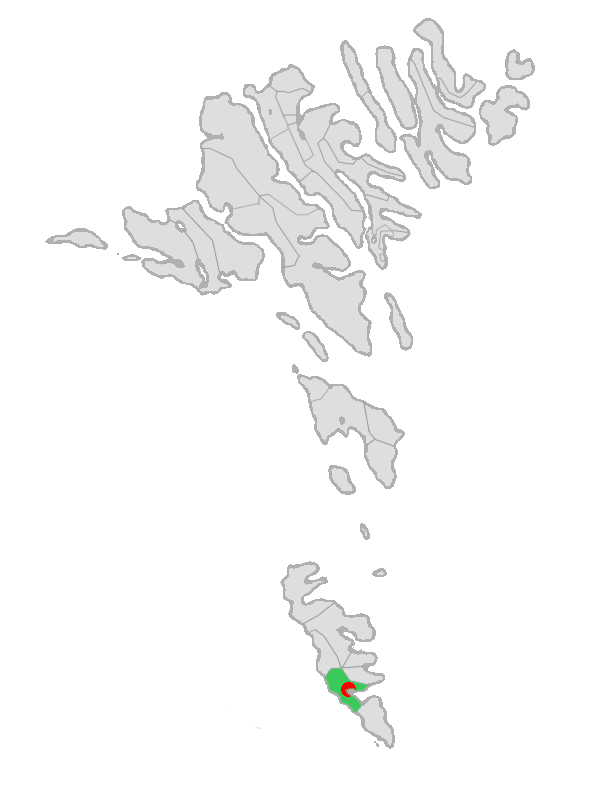
- Location of Vágs kommuna in the Faroe Islands

- Location of Vágur in the Faroe Islands
- Coordinates: 61°28′31″N 6°48′26″W
- State: Kingdom of Denmark
- Constituent country: Faroe Islands
- Island: Suðuroy

Government
  - Mayor: Bjarni Johansen

Population (September 2025)
  - Total: 1,333
- Time zone: GMT
  - Summer (DST): UTC+1 (WEST)
- Postal code: FO 900
- Climate: Cfc
- Website: Official homepage

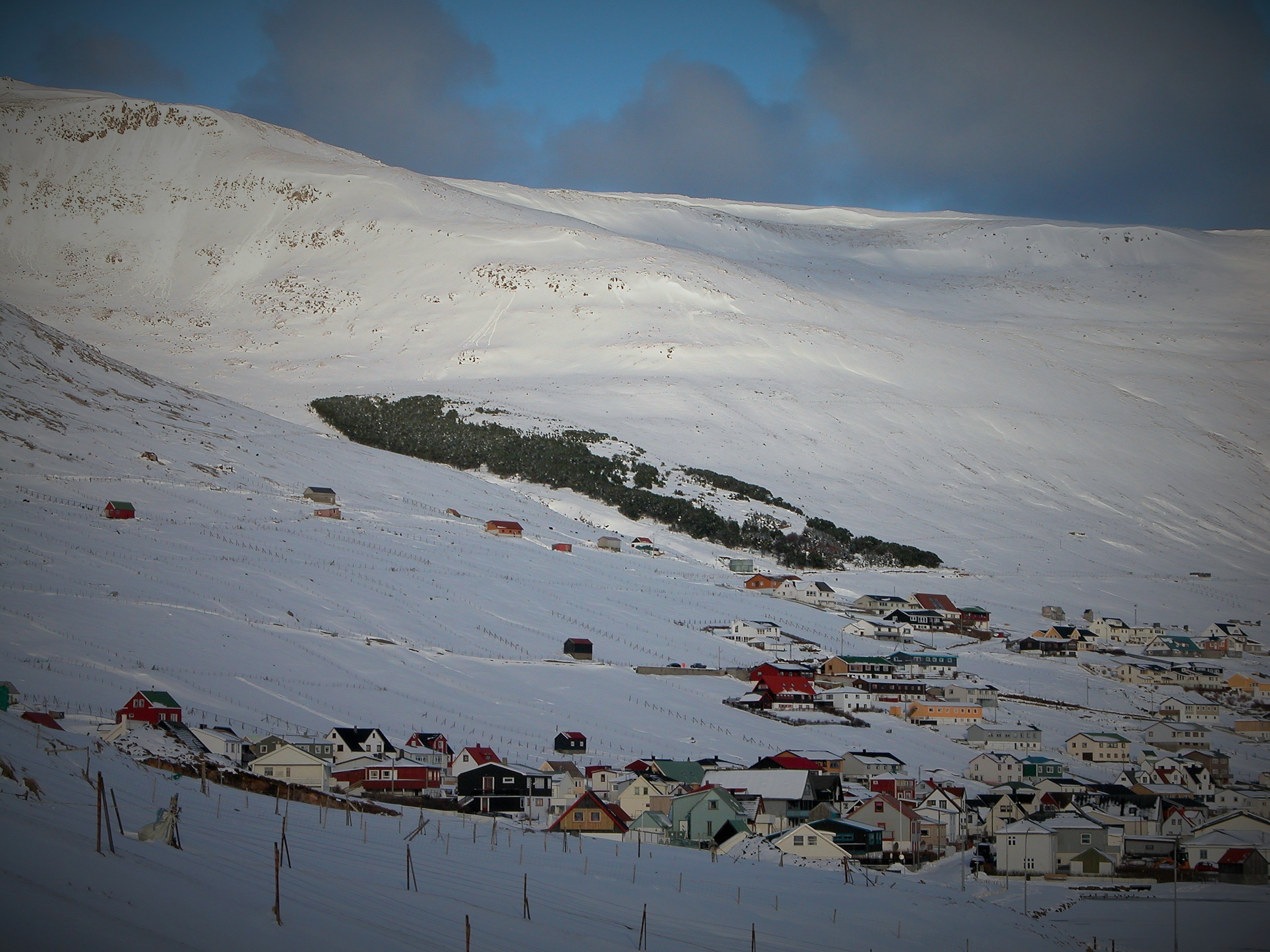
Vágur

Vágur, meaning bay (Danish: Våg), is a town and municipality on the island of Suðuroy, part of the Faroe Islands.

It is situated on the east coast of the island on the Vágsfjørður fjord, and was founded in the fourteenth century. Expansion has meant that the nearby town of Nes is now a suburb of Vágur. Vágur has a sports hall next to the football grounds on Eiðinum, near Vágseiði, a swimming pool by the school and a clinic which offers the services of doctors, nurses and dentists. There is also a hotel, one bank and various shops.

The port area, which is 14 m in depth, is situated on the northern part of the fjord. The port authorities can offer services of piloting (lods), water and fire-fighting, and in connection with the harbour there is a modern fish factory and auctioneers for fish. Salmon farming is also a part of the fish industry in Vágur, this includes salmon farm rings on the fjord and in other places near the east coast of Suðuroy and a salmon factory.

The town has a slipway, a fleet of fishing vessels and a filleting factory.

== The Mayor of Vágur ==
Bjarni Johansen has served as the mayor of Vágur Municipality since 1 January 2021, after being elected in the municipal elections held in November 2020. As mayor, he represents the Social Democratic Party (Javnaðarflokkurin) and is responsible for overseeing local government functions and municipal services in Vágur, which is the main town on the island of Suðuroy in the Faroe Islands. His leadership focuses on community development, infrastructure, and promoting cultural and sporting activities in the municipality.

== Visit by the Danish Royal Family (2025) ==
On 12 June 2025, Vágur received a royal visit from King Frederik X, Queen Mary, and Princess Josephine of Denmark as part of their official tour of the Faroe Islands. During their time in the town, they explored Fablab Vágur, visited Hamragarður, and participated in an outdoor activity by ziplining over Múlagjógv, one of the village's scenic natural sites. The royal family was warmly welcomed by a large crowd of residents and guests and were noted for their kindness and approachability. They dined at Hamragarður alongside many locals and were also introduced to several of the area's local institutions and businesses, including Kirvi Water, Tangavirkið, and Suðuroyar Sparikassi. The visit was considered a historic moment for the community and received widespread attention throughout the Faroe Islands.

== History ==
- In 1350 Vágur is mentioned for the first time in historical documents, when it was mentioned in the Dog Letter that several dog owners were in Vágur.
- People from the village were found not guilty in trading with a ship from the Netherlands. The reason that they were found not guilty was because the court found that they had been forced to trade because of hunger in the island of Suðuroy.
- In 1538 the former priest Andrass gives his first Lutheran speech in the Faroe Islands in the church of Vágur. Because of this the church of Vágur was held in high esteem and regarded as one of the most sacred of the churches in the Faroe Islands.
- In 1584 according to the books from the Løgting, 17 people were living in Vágur.
- In 1804 Nólsoyar Páll bought a shipwreck (the English Sally & Polly) at an auction in Hvalba together with Jákup í Toftum (from Vágur) and Per í Gjørðum (from Porkeri). They rebuilt the ship on Fløtan Fríða in Vágur and named it Royndin Fríða. By building Royndin Fríða, Nólsoyar-Páll and his crew from Vágur and Porkeri were the first Faroese people who broke the Danish monopoly to sail to and from the Faroe Islands.
- In 1860 Jacob Dahl founded his company J. Dahl Ltd., which soon was to become one of the largest trading companies of the Faroe Islands and some years later also one of the biggest shipping companies. The company was located in the western part of the village in the neighbourhood of á Gørðunum (a Gordunum).
- In 1870 William Askham built a storage house in Marknoyri in the eastern part of Vágur. He bought fish from British smacks and processed it to clipfish (literally 'cliff fish', i.e. dried and salted cod), which was exported.
- From the 1870s Vágur and Tvøroyri (also in Suðuroy) became the main harbours for the large-scale fishery by Iceland and Greenland; Vágur was for many years one of the fastest growing settlements of the Faroe Islands.
- In 1905 Vágs Bóltfelag, VB (football and handball club) was founded on 6 June. The handball club is still called VB, the football club changed its name to FC Suðuroy on 1 January 2010.
- In 1906 an aerial cableway (tráðbani in Faroese) was built on Vágseiði (Vágur is located where the island is narrow, at an isthmus, the better and more quiet harbour is inside the fjord, but in older days they also used the coast of Vágseiði west of the village as a harbour to go fishing, if the weather didn't permit to go fishing towards the east, but the sea is mostly rough and dangerous on Vágseiði, therefore they wished to land in the more sheltered Múlagjógv). The cableway was built from Múlagjógv towards east to the shore of Vágseiði. The cableway made it easier and safer to land the boats. They had boat-houses there. They could transport both fish and boats this way. In 1906 there was no electricity so the cableway was hand-powered until they got electricity.
- In 1921 Vágur Municipality built the first power plant of the Faroe Islands, when they built the hydro-electric power plant in Botnur, north-west of Vágur.
- In 1939 the new Church of Vágur was built, the building took several years, and the church was finally consecrated in 1939.
- 1939-1945: Vágur lost 9 ships during World War II. Among them were: Aldan TG25 went missing on its way to Aberdeen, Scotland with iced fish on ca. 25 July 1940 (6 men died, all from Vágur), Cheerful TG321 exploded near Skopun on 17 October 1940 (7 men died, from Vágur, Hvalba and Nólsoy), Gracie TG630 went missing on its way to Vestmanna Islands in Iceland on ca. 16 February 1943 (7 men died, from Vágur and Haldarsvík). Milly TG755 went missing on its way from Aberdeen to the Faroe Islands on ca. 23 March 1941 (7 men died, from Vágur, Porkeri, Hvalba, Kirkja and Víkarbyrgi). Heimdalur TG338 had an accident in Iceland, not due to war reasons, there was an iceberg and the weather was bad, all men were saved. Poulina TG340 was also lost.
- In 1951 a new school was built just east of the church. The school opened in 1951.
- Around 1967 the fish factory Suðurfisk was built and opened.
- In 1977 Jákup Joensen from Lopra (born in Sumba) and others arranged to build a modern and large fish factory named Polarfrost. It was built in the harbour on the northern side of the fjord, near the school and church. The same owners also owned several trawlers which were fishing for the new fish factory. The names of these ships ended with borg. Some of these were Polarborg I and II, Akraborg, Brimborg, Nýborg, Nesborg and Varðborg.
- In 1979 the School of Vágur (Vágs Skúli) was now too small for all the children, the population had increased since the school was built, so they built two extensions plus a new swimming pool which was 25m long, this was the first swimming pool in Vágur, before that people had to swim outdoors if they wished to learn how to swim. One of the new buildings was being used already in 1978, but the rest was not finished until 1979, when the new school opened officially on 2 September 1979. The new school was connected with the older one.
- In 2001 the Stóra Pakkhús (the Large Storage House) on Garðarnar (á Gørðunum) in Vágur, where the J. Dahl inc. was earlier, was now restored and opened officially on 19 October as a cultural house. It was Stóra Pakkhús Association with Dennis Holm, Búi Dahl and others who bought the building from the new owners of the buildings of the former J. Dahl company, DJ Vilhelm, who had bought all the building. The Stóra Pakkhús Association was staffed by people from local associations: Vágs Kappróðrarfelag (rowing club of Vágur), Vágs Sóknar Bygdasavn (The Museum of Vágur), Johanna TG 326 (the smack Johanna), Felagið Garðabrúgv, Grindabátafelagið and Nýggjársnevndin (The New Year's Committee). A few craftsmen were paid for their work, but some 70 people worked without pay in restoring the Large Storage House.
- In 2007 Susvim (Suðuroyar Svimjifelag / Suduroy Swimming Club) was founded on 6 September. The former swimming clubs in Vágur and Tvøroyri, Vágs Svimjifelag and Tvøroyrar Svimjifelag (founded on 6 March 1964), merged.
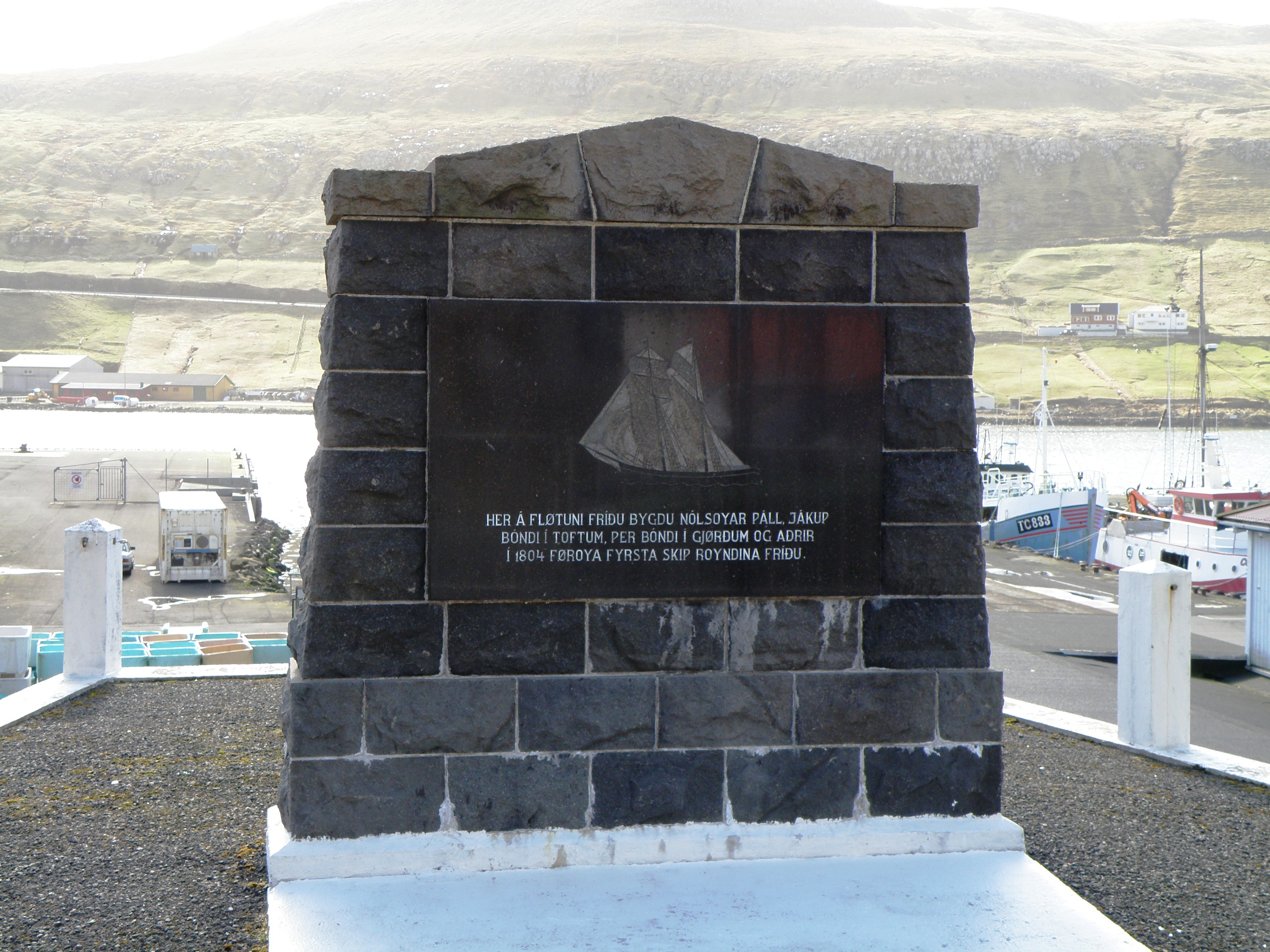
Memorial in memory of Royndin Fríða, which was built here in 1804, the first Faroese ship since the Middle Ages

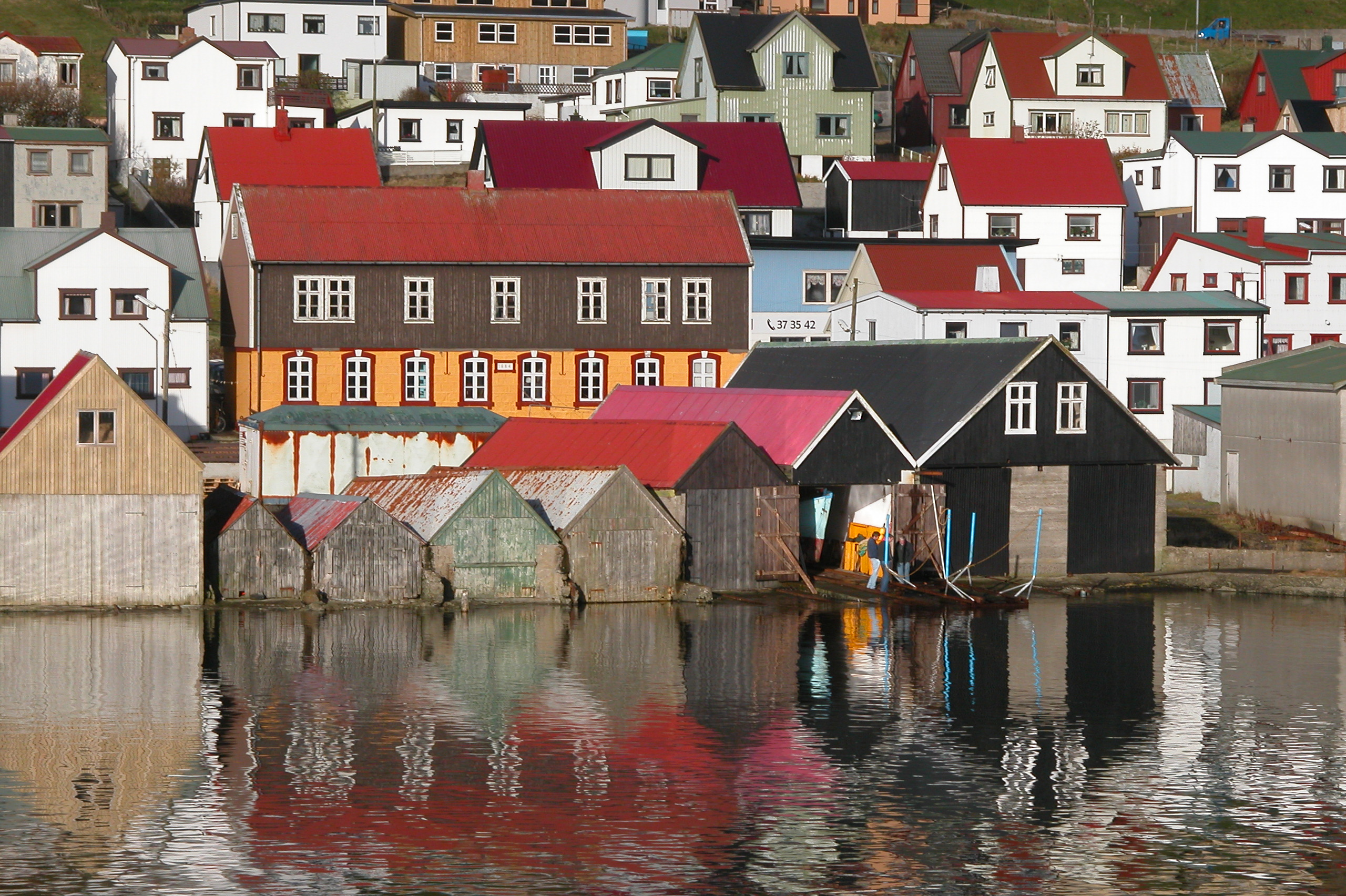
The old school, houses and boat-houses in Vágur

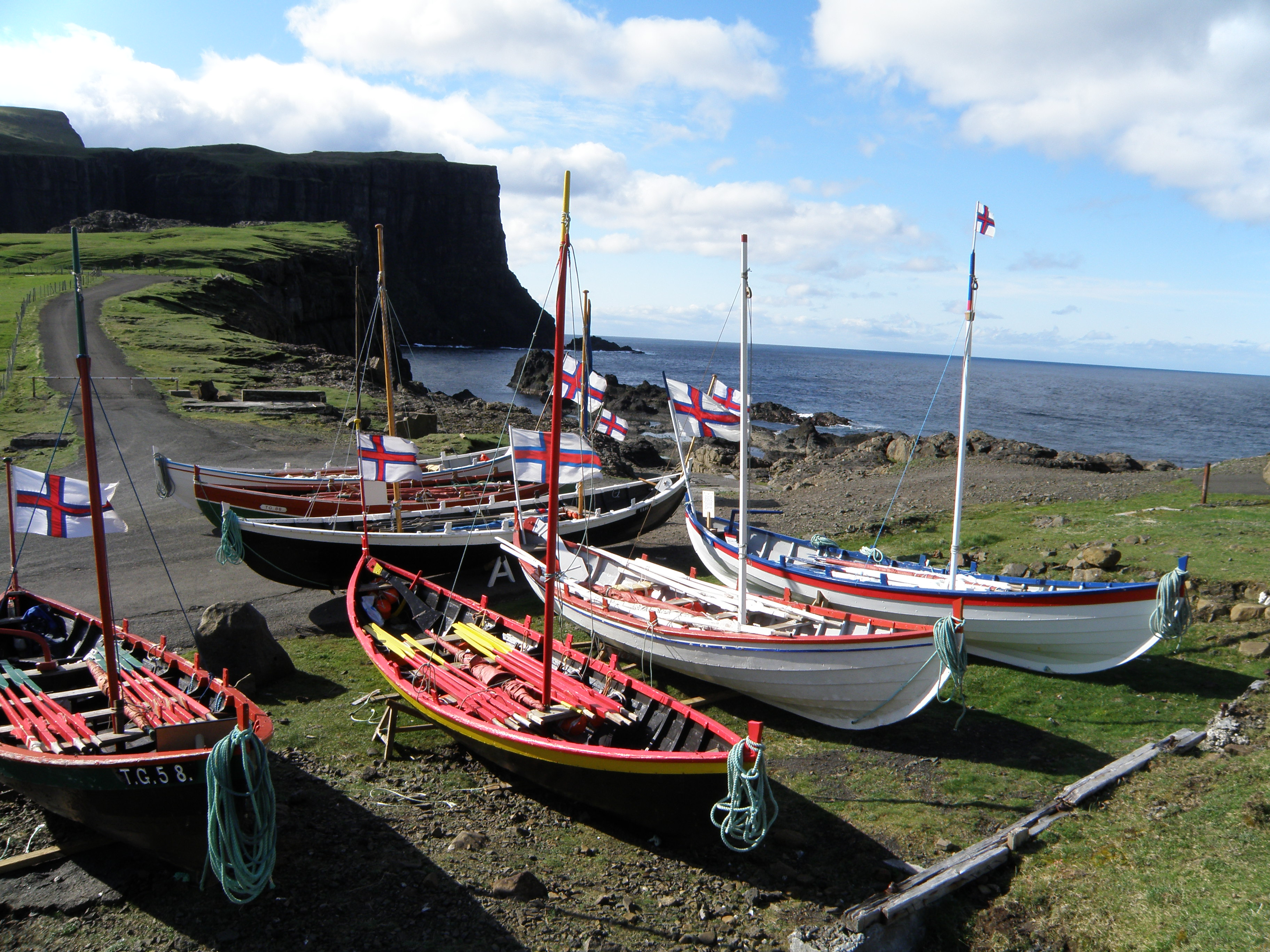
Wooden row boats from Vágur on Vágseiði, the oldest one was built in 1872

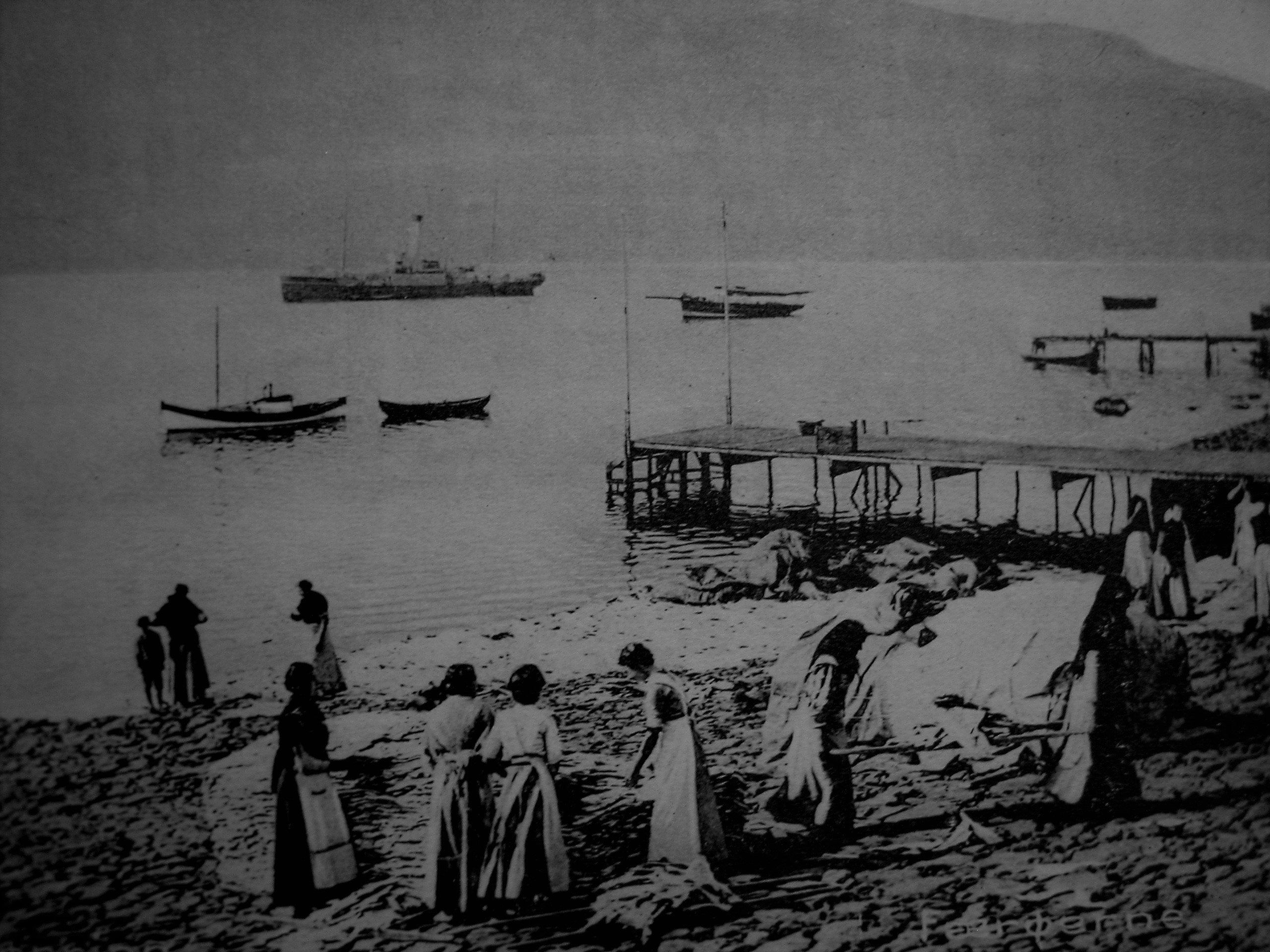
Dryfish work in Vágur 1907

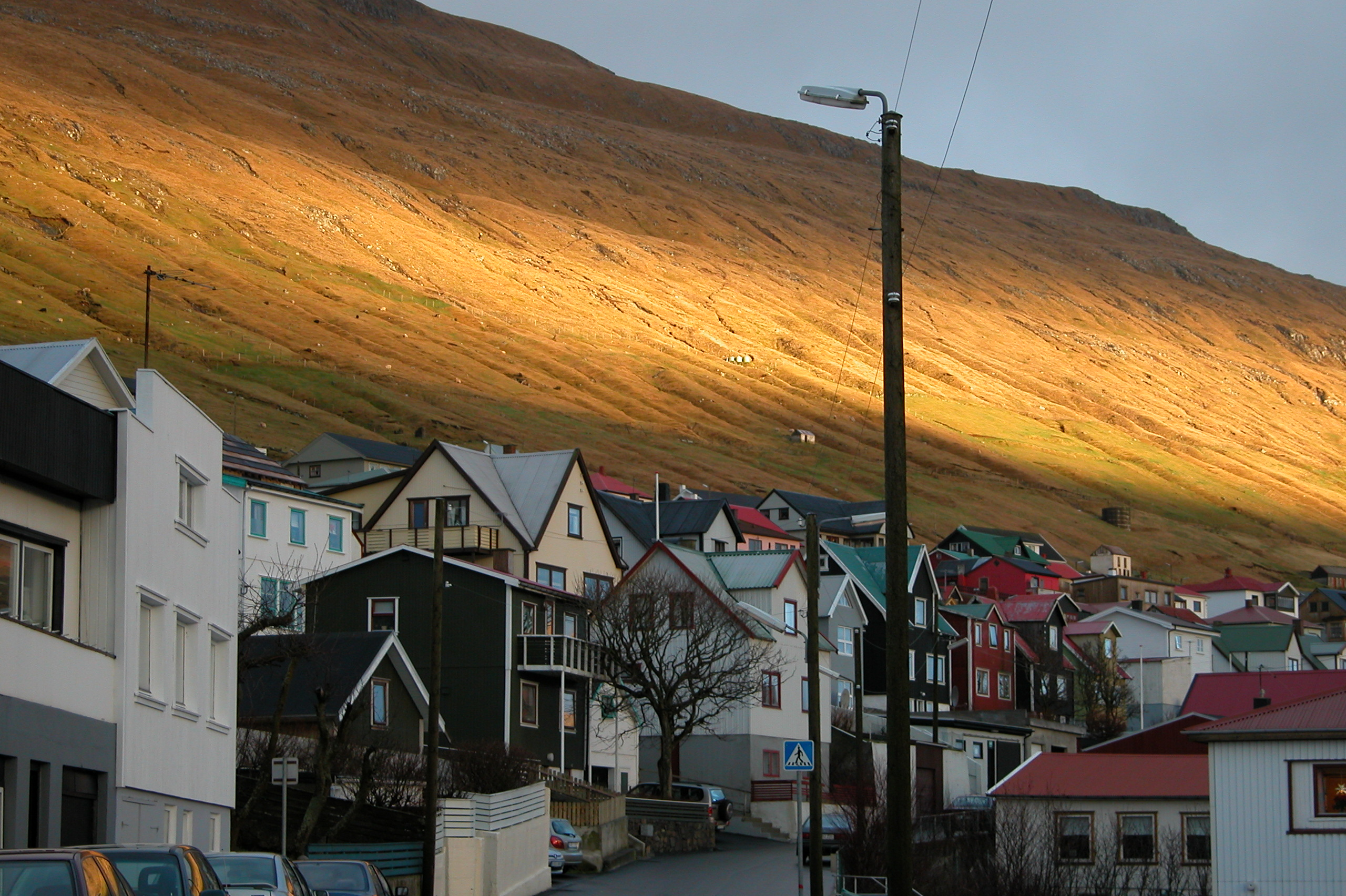
Typical dramatic light scenery in the Faroe Islands: the town of Vágur, winter 2004

=== Nólsoyar Páll Memorial ===
There is a memorial near the main road through Vágur commemorating the efforts of Nólsoyar Páll, the nineteenth-century poet and captain of Royndin Fríða (Beautiful Trial). He believed that the monopoly trading scheme was seriously restricting the economic potential of the Faroe Islands and set about organising opposition and resistance to it. Although he failed to abolish the monopolies, his actions were the start of a process which eventually led to the abolition of monopoly trading in 1856. The memorial was erected in memory of the fact that in 1804 on this spot, now called Fløtan Fríða, the first Faroese ship since the Middle Ages was built. The text on the memorial says: "Her á Fløtuni Fríðu bygdu Nólsoyar Páll, Jákup bóndi í Toftum, Per bóndi í Gjørðum og aðrir í 1804 Føroya fyrsta skip Royndina Fríðu." - "Here on Fløtan Fríða Nólsoyar Páll, Jákup bóndi í Toftum (a farmer from Toftir in Vágur), Per bóndi í Gjørðum (a farmer from Gjørðum in Porkeri) and others built the first Faroese ship, Royndin Fríða."

=== First Faroese hydroelectric power plant ===
The first hydroelectric power station in the Faroe Islands was built in Botni northwest of Vágur in 1921, partly to power the ship cableway in Vágseiði. It is now supplemented by a modern diesel power station on the south side of the fjord.

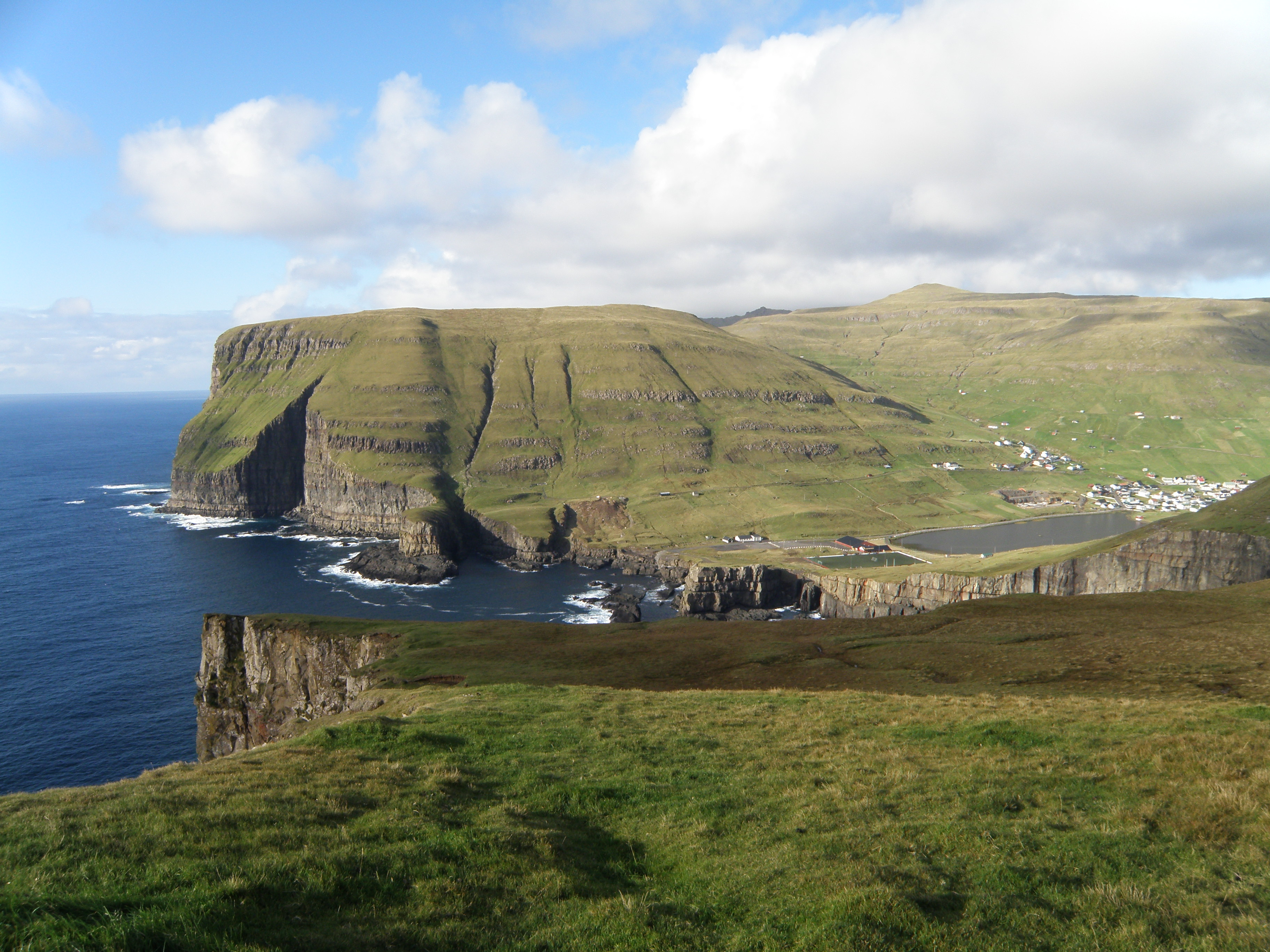
View from Eggjarnar

== Tourism ==
The tourist attractions include a wide variety of excursions during the summer. Amongst other things on offer is a boat trip on the old fishing boat, Jóhanna TG 326, west around the island to an area where birds flock and nest by the thousand, close to the world's steepest cliff, Beinisvørð.

Hiking trips are arranged every summer by the Tourist Information.

There is a Ruth Smith Art Museum in Vágur. It doesn't have regular opening hours, but there are phone number which visitors can call to. The Ruth Smith Art Gallery is situated in the western part of the village of Vágur in a yellow building on the mainstreet Vágsvegur 101.

For visitors arriving by boat, Vágur is situated 61° 21' north and 06° 49' west.

== Notable landmarks ==
=== Eggjarnar ===
Eggjarnar is high up in the mountains south west of Vágur. A road leads all the way up there because a Loran C radio navigation station was built there during World War II.

=== Vágseiði ===
Vágseiði was used as a second harbor for the men of Vágur, when the wind came from east and the eastern harbor could not be used. Vágseiði has also been used to dump garbage into the sea, but that stopped many years ago. Now all garbage is gathered and burnt by IRF.

=== Porkeri Mountains ===
Porkeri Mountains are the hills north of Vágur, named after the village of Porkeri.

== Sports ==
Vágur had a football club, which was called VB, it was founded in 1905. In 2005 VB merged with Sumba ÍF to VB/Sumba and in 2010 they founded a new football club, which is called FC Suðuroy. But VB is not completely history yet, the VB women still play handball using the name VB. VB is short for Vágs Bóltfelag. Vágur has a famous swimmer, Pál Joensen, a Freestyle swimmer, won 3 gold medals at the 2008 European Junior Swimming Championships. He has also won gold later, swimming with the adults in 2009 in Moscow and 2010 in South Africa. In August 2010 he won silver at the European Swimming Championships on long course. Pál Joensen is swimming with Susvim, which is a swimming club for Suðuroy. There is a rowing club in Vágur, which is called Vágs Kappróðrarfelag. They have wooden rowing boats in all sizes: Vágbingur is a 10-mannafar, Toftaregin is an 8-mannafar, Smyril is a 6-mannafar and Royndin Fríða is a 5-mannafar.

== Politics ==
=== Municipal council ===
Vágur's municipal council consists of 9 members, elected every four years.

| Election | Party | | | Total seats | Turnout | Elected mayor |
|---|---|---|---|---|---|---|
| Election | B | C | E | Total seats | Turnout | Elected mayor |
| 2016 | 2 | 3 | 4 | 9 | 88.1% | Dennis Holm (E) |
Data from Kvf.fo

== Photos from Vágur ==
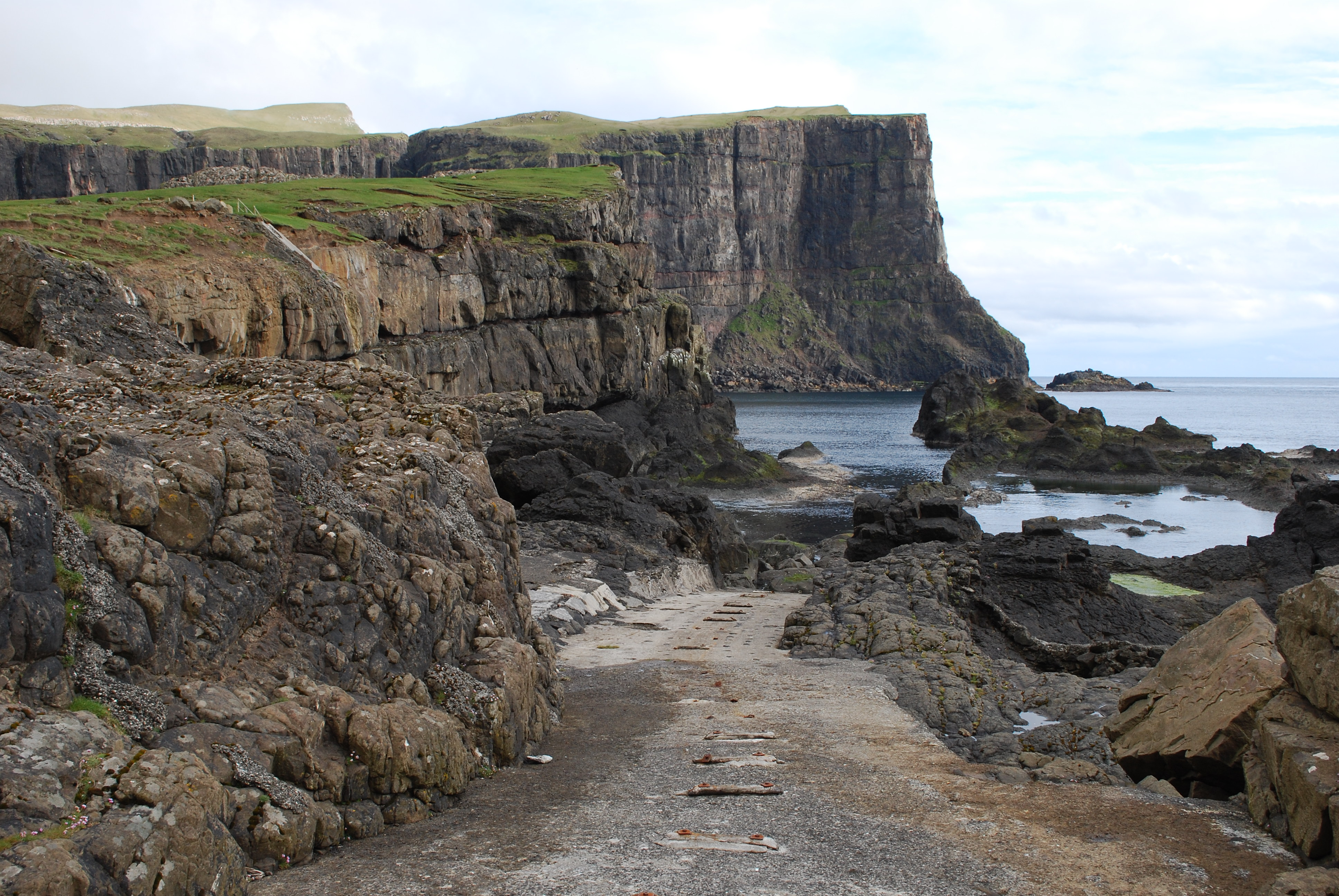
Vágseiði

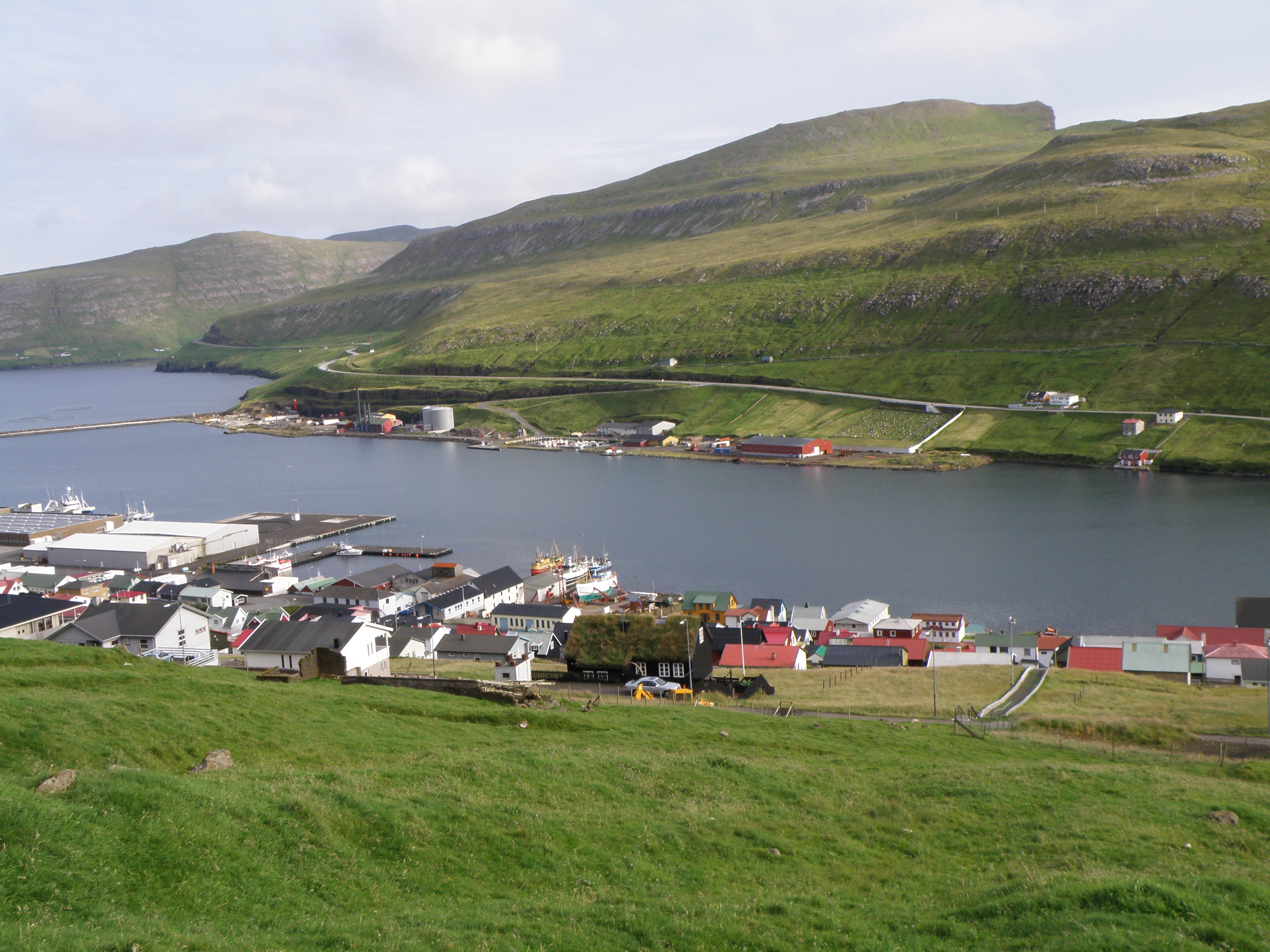
Vágur and the fjord Vágsfjørður

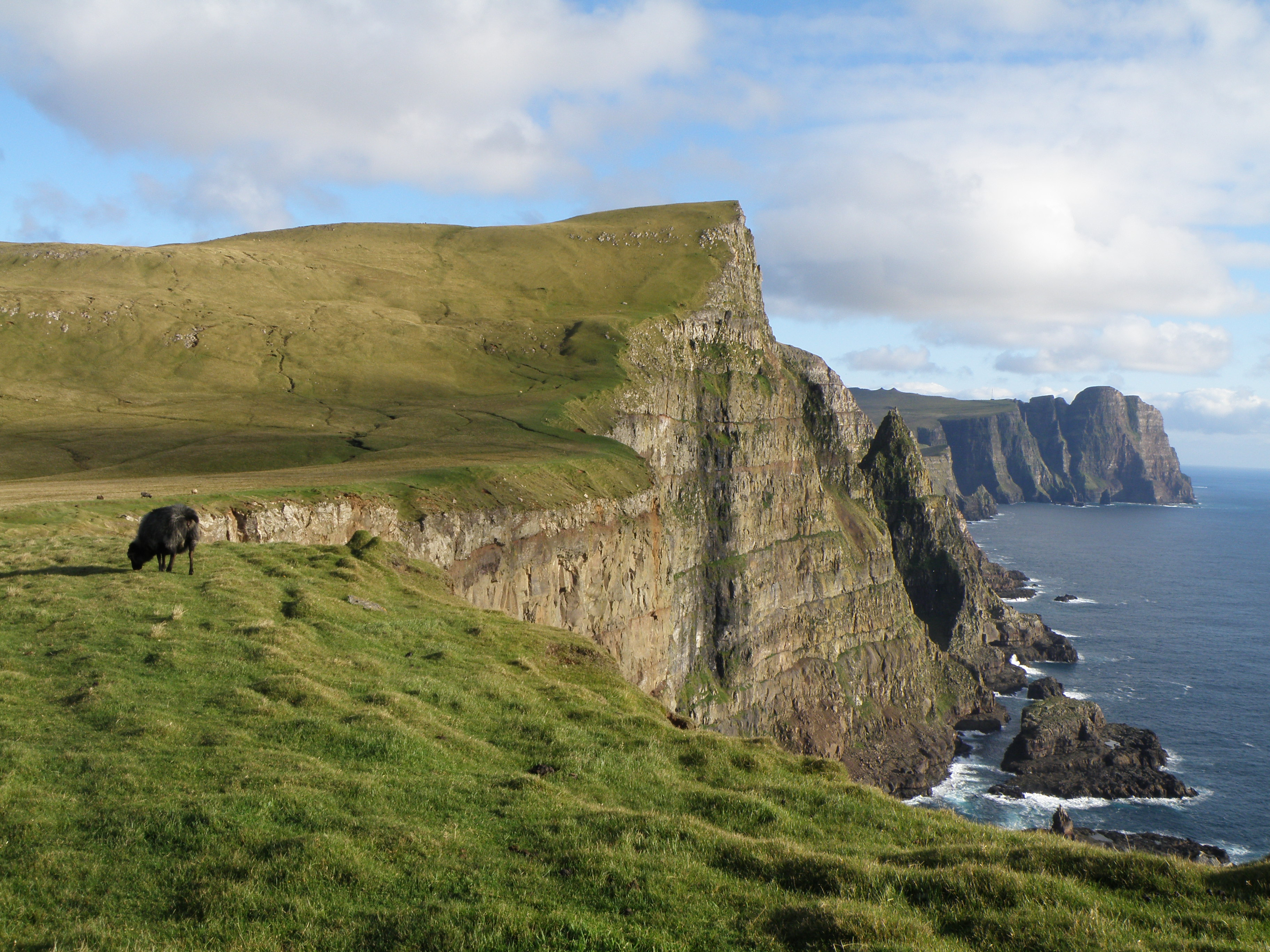
View from Eggjarnar, south of Vágur towards Beinisvørð, a 470 meter high sea cliff

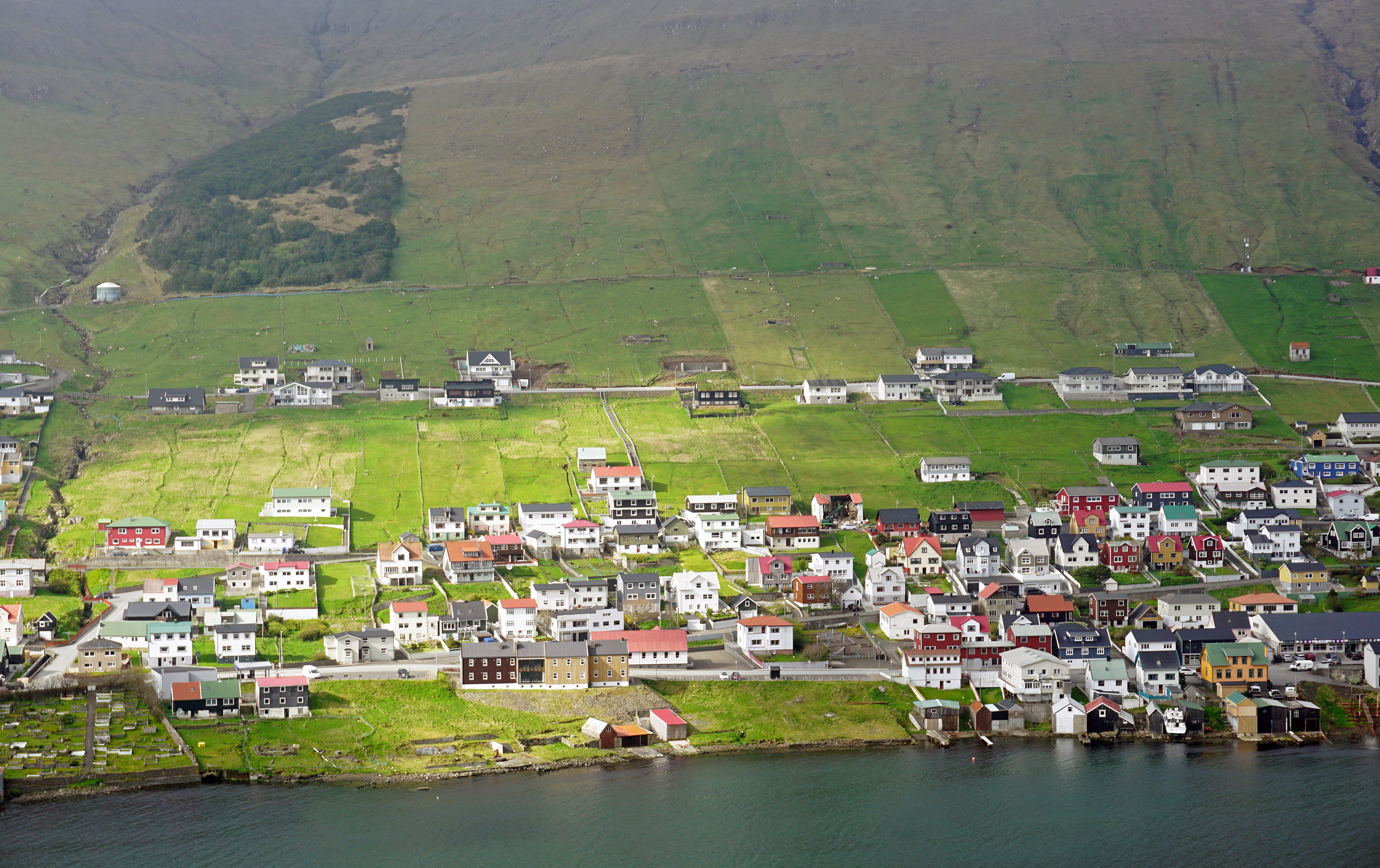
Vágur

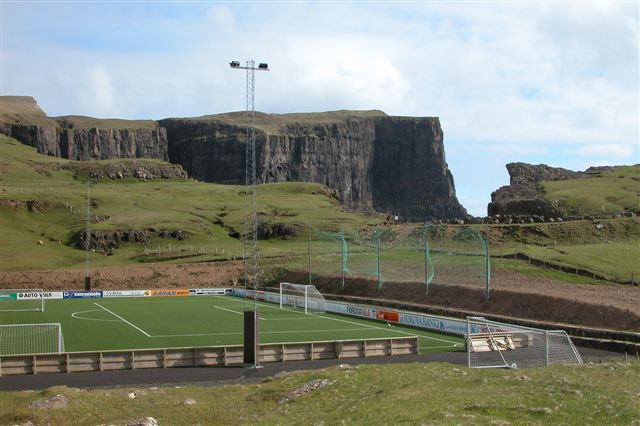
Vágseiði and the football field of FC Suðuroy

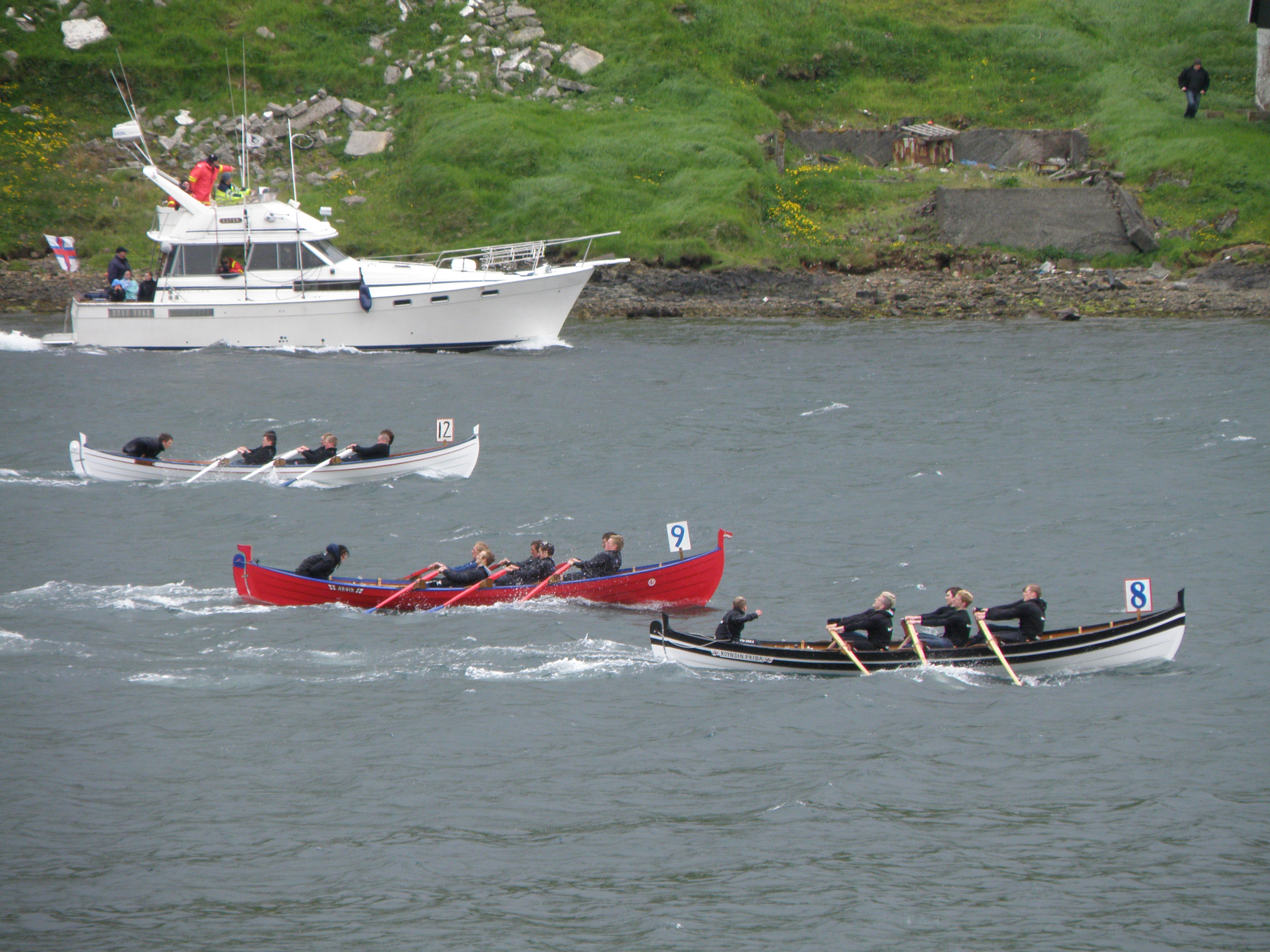
Rowing competition in Vágur at the Jóansøka Festival 2010

== See also ==
- List of towns in the Faroe Islands
