= Vágs Bóltfelag =

Sports club in Faroe Islands

- Founded: June 5, 1905; 120 years ago
- Sports director: (Faroe Islands) Vigdis Nolsøe
- Head coach: (Denmark) Claus Rasmussen
- League: Faroese Handball League (Elektronkappingin)
- 2011/12: 3
- Club colours
| Home | Away |

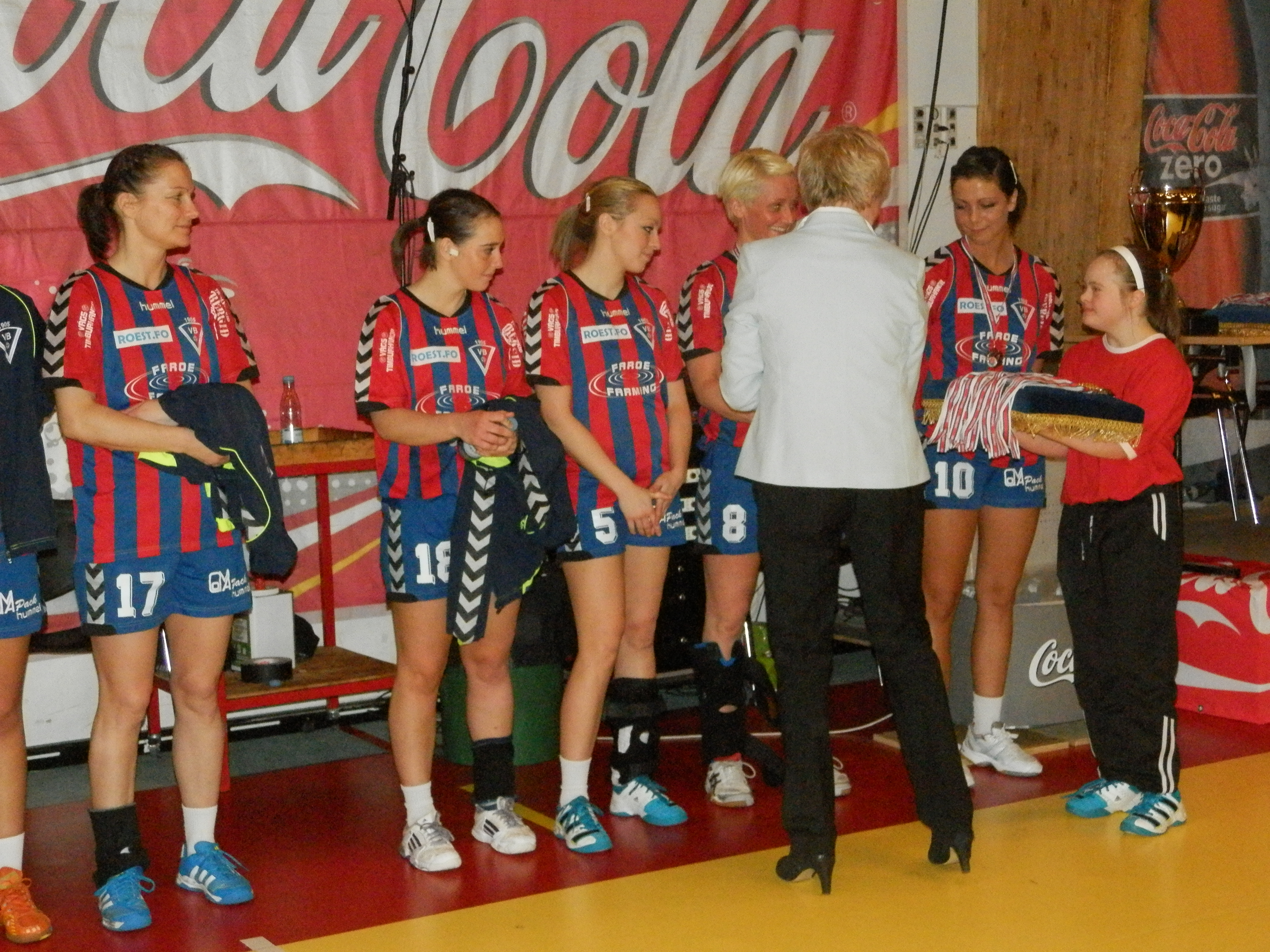
In February 2013 VB was number two in the Coca-Cola Cup

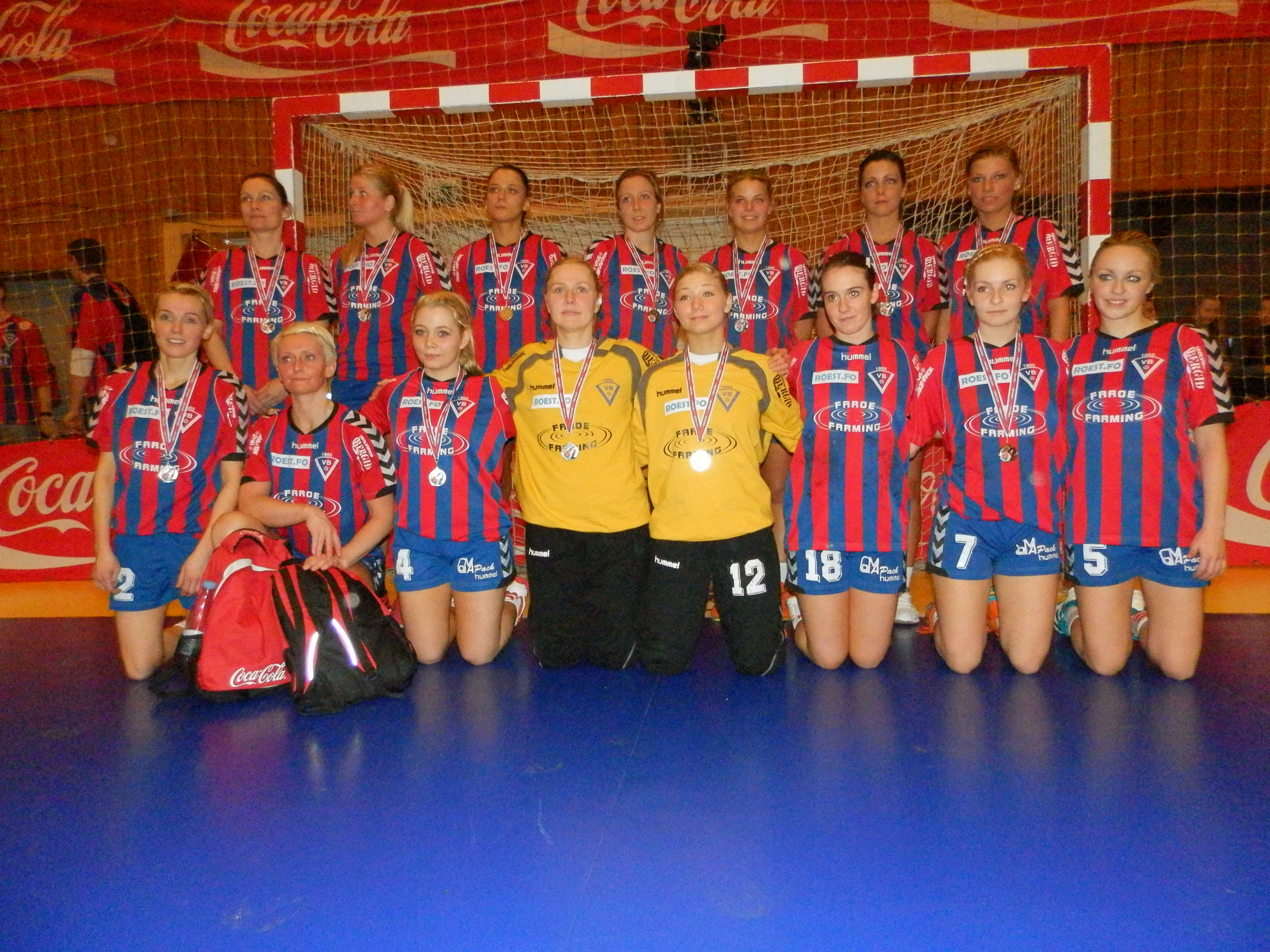
VB's women's team just after playing the final against Neistin, which Neistin won 27–24 on 9 Feb. 2013.

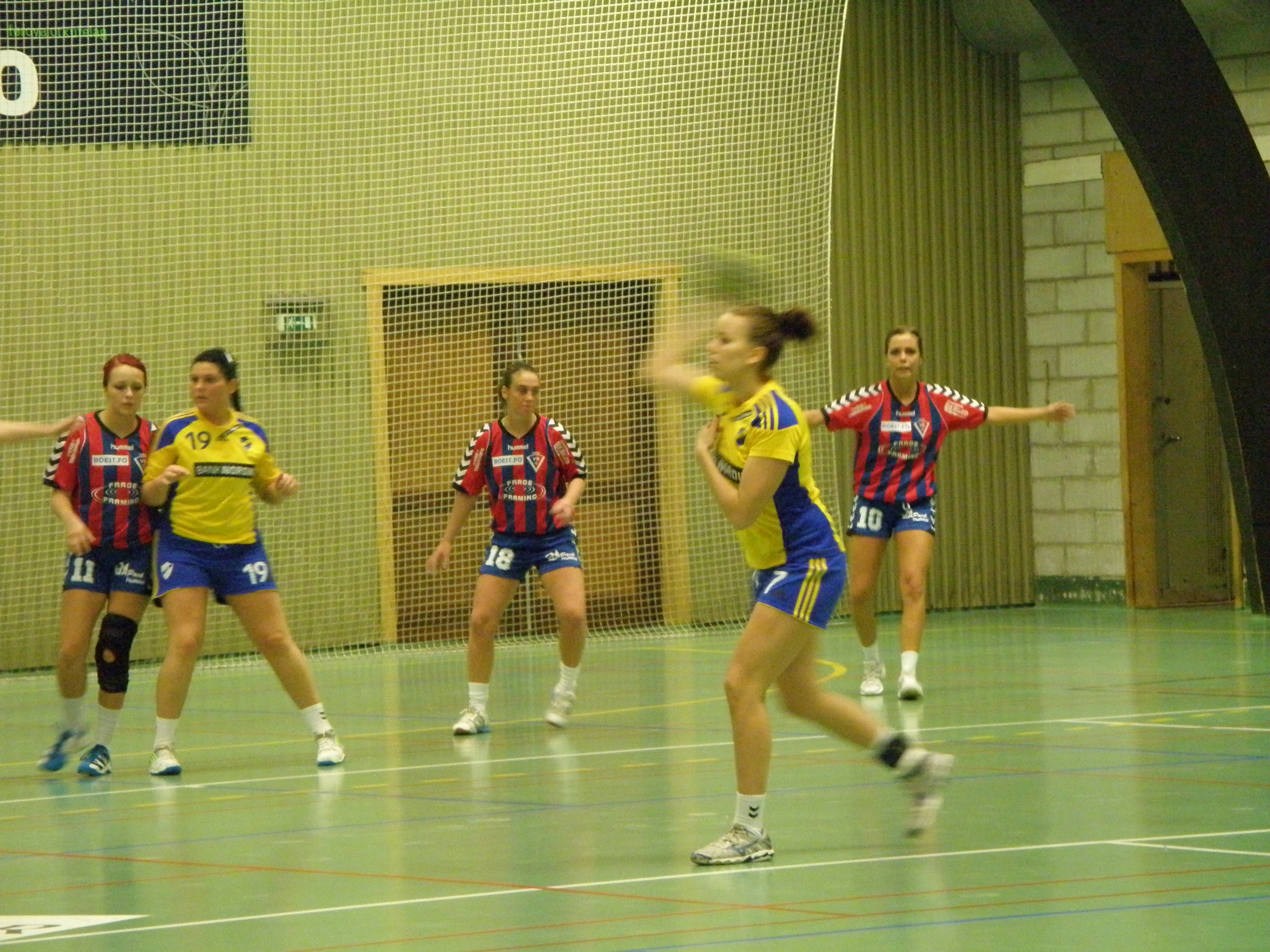
VB vs. VÍF Vestmanna in Sunsetkappingin in November 2011.

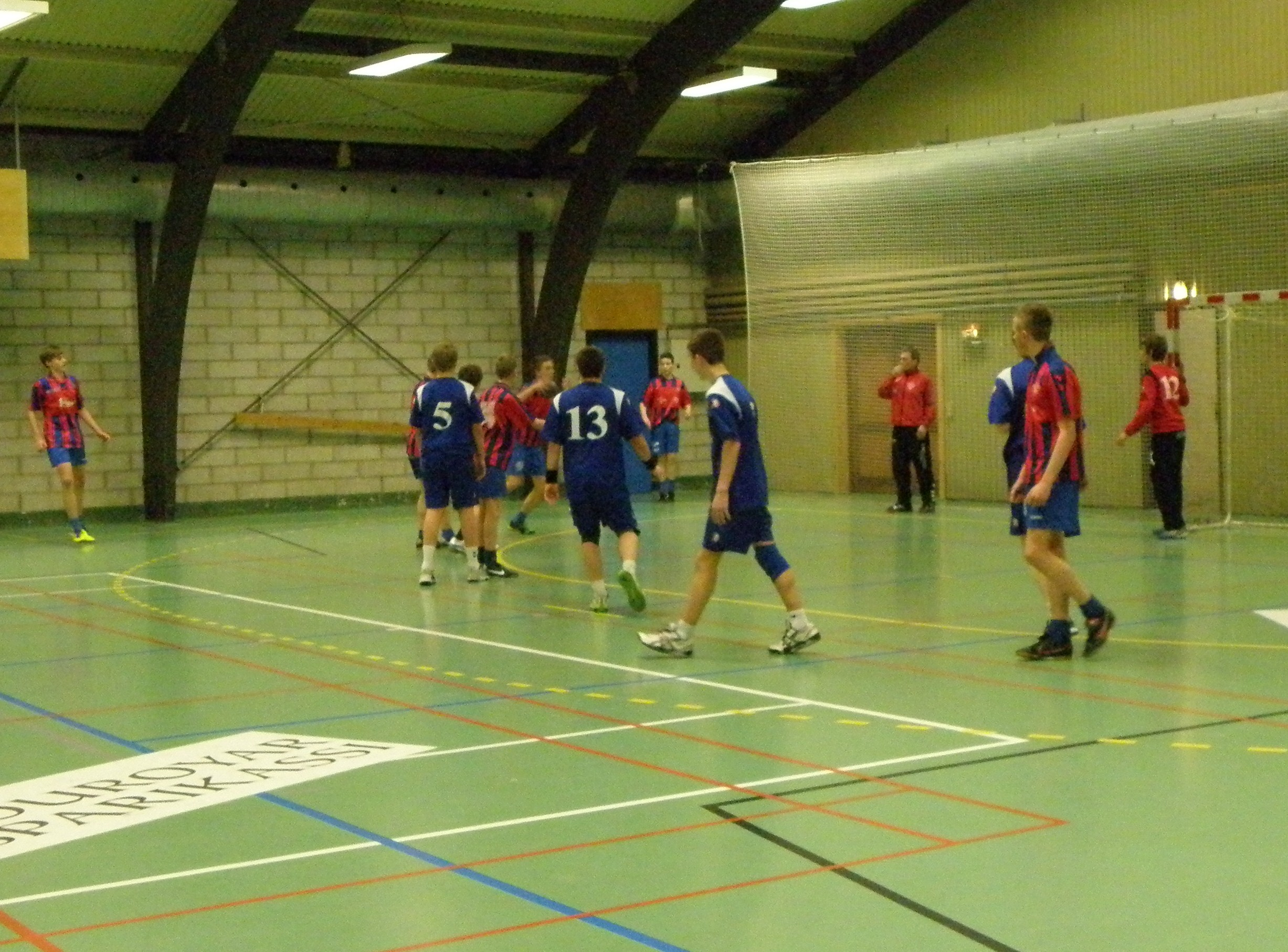
Boys 16: VB vs. Neistin from Tórshavn.

Vágs Bóltfelag (VB) is a Faroese current handball and former football club. It started as a football club, which was founded on 5 June 1905, but later the sport handball became a part of the club. The handball club is based in Vágur in Suðuroy. They play their home matches in the sports hall, Vágshøll on Eiðinum in Vágur. The football department merged with SÍ Sumba in 2005 to become what is now known as FC Suðuroy.

== Women's handball ==
VB was earlier a handball club for men and women. But since the football competition was changed, so it now starts earlier and ends later, it is not possible anymore, or at least very difficult, for the same person to play both handball and football. So now the handball in Vágur is mostly for women and football is mostly for the men, in the best divisions anyway, the men have a team in the second best division. The population is only 1400, there are not enough people to get good teams in both sports for both genders in such a small village. The women's best division was called 1. deild until 2005 when they changed the name for sponsor reasons to Sunset kappingin or Sunsetdeildin.

=== Honours ===
The VB handball team has won the Faroese Championships three times: 1950, 2003 and 2005.

=== Team ===
The current squad as of February 2013

| NR | Name | Nationality | Position |
|---|---|---|---|
| 2 | Rannvá Augustinussen | Faroe Islands | Right wing |
| 3 | Una Nolsøe | Faroe Islands | Left wing |
| 4 | Bjarta Hergeirsdóttir | Faroe Islands | Pivot |
| 5 | Una Egilsdóttir | Faroe Islands | Middle back |
| 6 | Bára Krosslá Mortensen | Faroe Islands | Pivot |
| 7 | Rúna Midjord Jacobsen | Faroe Islands | Right wing |
| 8 | Gurið Mortensen | Faroe Islands | Left back |
| 9 | Tamara Seja Radic | Serbia | Middle back |
| 10 | Helga Eyðunsdóttir Kjærbo | Faroe Islands | Left wing |
| 11 | Marijana Trbojevis | Serbia | Left back |
| 12 | Beinta Ludvig Gudmundsson | Faroe Islands | Goalkeeper |
| 14 | Birita Hermansdóttir Olsen | Faroe Islands | Left wing |
| 15 | Laila Midjord Jespersen | Faroe Islands | Pivot |
| 17 | Christina Holm | Faroe Islands | Pivot |
| 18 | Andrea Nielsen | Faroe Islands | Right back |
| 22 | Guðrun í Lágabø | Faroe Islands | Goalkeeper |

== Foreign players ==
Over the last decade it has become normal for Faroese handball clubs as well football clubs, to import foreign players in order to improve the team. This is also the fact regarding VB. In 2004 the Football club signed 22-year-old Lithuanian International, Mindaugas Grigalevičius. In 1996 Tomislav Sivić became player/manager for the football team, when he first came to Faroe Islands. The team was coached by another young foreign player/manager, Krzysztof Popczyński, from 1998 to 2001. Most of the foreign players who played for VB were from Eastern Europe, as well as some from Denmark, Iceland and Africa. Although like other football clubs in the Faroe Islands, the large majority of players in the squad were Faroese.

In 2010 the Handball team made an agreement with three players from Lithuania. In 2011 two players from Serbia are playing handball with VB, Na and one player, the goal keeper, comes from Lithuania.

== Community Role ==
VB plays an important role in the social and sporting life of Vágur. In a small community like Suðuroy, local clubs like VB are not only sporting institutions but also serve as centers of community identity and pride. The club regularly engages with youth and promotes sports for health, inclusion, and tradition.

== The football club ==
The VB football team was founded on 5 June 1905. 90 years later, in 1995, the club merged with Sumba to form Sumba/VB, although the merger only lasted a single season. 10 years later, in 2005, there was a second merger between VB Vágur and Sumba, and formed VB/Sumba, which later had its name changed to FC Suðuroy. Other divisions of FC Suðuroy play some of their home games in Sumba at the á Krossinum Stadium.

=== Honours ===
- Faroe Islands Premier League: 1
  - 2000
- Faroe Islands Cup: 1
  - 1974

=== VB in Europe ===
- 1Q = 1st Qualifying Round

| Season | Competition | Round | Club | Home | Away |
|---|---|---|---|---|---|
| 1998 | UEFA Intertoto Cup | 1Q | (Czech Republic) Brno | 0–3 | 1–3 |
| 2001–02 | Champions League | 1Q | (Belarus) Slavia Mozyr | 0–0 | 0–5 |

=== Managers ===
- (Federal Republic of Yugoslavia) Tomislav Sivić (1996)
- (Poland) Krzysztof Popczyński (1998–01)
