= 2004 1. deild =

Coordinates: 62.0167°N 6.7667°W

1. deild
- Season: 2004
- Champions: HB
- Relegated: TB
- Matches played: 90
- Goals scored: 301 (3.34 per match)
- Biggest home win: EB/Streymur 7–0 ÍF
- Biggest away win: B68 0–5 HB; B68 0–5 NSÍ; ÍF 1–6 KÍ
- Highest scoring: B36 6–2 B68; HB 7–1 B68

Statistics of 1. deild in the 2004 season.

== Overview ==
It was contested by 10 teams, and Havnar Bóltfelag won the championship.

== League standings ==
Pos	Team	Pld	W	D	L	GF	GA	GD	Pts
1	Havnar Bóltfelag	18	12	5	1	47	18	+29	41
2	B36 Tórshavn	18	10	4	4	37	21	+16	34
3	Skála ÍF	18	9	3	6	32	23	+9	30
4	KÍ Klaksvík	18	6	8	4	25	24	+1	26
5	VB Vágur	18	7	4	7	27	24	+3	25
6	EB/Streymur	18	7	4	7	30	25	+5	25
7	NSÍ Runavík	18	7	4	7	28	25	+3	25
8	GÍ Gøta	18	6	5	7	31	35	−4	23
9	ÍF Fuglafjørður	18	3	3	12	25	51	−26	12
10	B68 Toftir	18	2	2	14	19	55	−36	8

Rules for classification: 1st points, 2nd head-to-head, 3rd goals average

== Results ==
The schedule consisted of a total of 18 games. Each team played two games against every opponent in no particular order. One of the games was at home and one was away.

Home \ Away	B36	B68	EBS	GÍG	HB	ÍF	KÍ	NSÍ	SKÁ	VBV
B36 Tórshavn		6–2	4–0	4–0	2–5	4–1	2–2	1–1	2–0	3–1
B68 Toftir	0–2		2–4	0–2	0–5	2–0	1–1	0–5	0–4	1–3
EB/Streymur	0–2	2–1		1–1	0–0	7–0	4–0	2–0	0–1	0–2
GÍ Gøta	0–3	5–2	1–3		1–3	3–2	1–2	1–1	1–1	2–4
Havnar Bóltfelag	1–0	7–1	3–0	3–3		4–2	1–1	1–0	4–1	2–1
ÍF Fuglafjørður	2–2	1–1	1–1	1–2	0–2		1–6	4–2	1–4	1–0
KÍ Klaksvík	0–1	1–0	2–2	1–1	1–1	3–2		1–0	1–1	0–0
NSÍ Runavík	1–2	3–2	1–0	2–1	2–2	1–2	3–1		2–0	1–1
Skála ÍF	2–0	2–1	2–3	4–0	3–1	4–3	1–2	1–2		1–0
VB Vágur	1–1	2–3	2–1	2–4	0–2	3–1	2–0	3–1	0–0	

Source: www.faroesoccer.com
Legend: Blue = home team win; Yellow = draw; Red = away team win.

== Top goalscorers ==
Source: faroesoccer.com

13 goals

- (Faroe Islands) Sonni L. Petersen (EB/Streymur)

12 goals

- (Faroe Islands) Súni Olsen (GÍ)
- (Faroe Islands) Rógvi Jacobsen (HB)

9 goals

- (Denmark) Jacob Bymar (KÍ)
- (Faroe Islands) Jónhard Frederiksberg (Skála)

8 goals

- (Faroe Islands) John Petersen (B36)
- (Denmark) Heine Fernandez (HB)
- (Faroe Islands) Bogi Gregersen (Skála)

7 goals

- (Faroe Islands) Egil á Bø (B36)
- (Brazil) Anderson Cardena (B68)
- (Romania) Sorin Anghel (EB/Streymur)
- (Faroe Islands) Heðin á Lakjuni (HB)
- (Faroe Islands) Høgni Zachariassen (ÍF)
- (Faroe Islands) Erling Fles (KÍ)
