= 2008 Faroe Islands Premier League =

Faroe Islands Premier League
- Season: 2008
- Champions: EB/Streymur; 1st Faroese title
- Relegated: B71 Sandoy; Skála ÍF
- Champions League: EB/Streymur
- Europa League: HB Tórshavn; B36 Tórshavn; NSÍ Runavík
- Matches played: 135
- Goals scored: 364 (2.7 per match)
- Top goalscorer: Arnbjørn Hansen (20)
- Biggest home win: HB 8–1 Skála ÍF
- Biggest away win: B71 0–5 Víkingur
- Highest scoring: EB/Streymur 4–5 B36; HB 8–1 Skála ÍF

The 2008 season of the Faroe Islands Premier League was the 66th season of the Faroese top-tier football since its establishment. It started on 29 March 2008 with a match between B36 Tórshavn and ÍF Fuglafjørður. The match was won by B36 with 4–0. The last games were played on 25 October 2008. NSÍ Runavík were the defending champions.

== Team changes from the previous season ==
AB Argir and VB Vágur were relegated to 1. deild after finishing 9th and 10th in the 2007 season. They were replaced by 1. deild champions B68 Toftir and runners-up ÍF Fuglafjørður.

Further, GÍ Gøta merged with 1. deild club Leirvík ÍF and therefore formed the club named Víkingur Gøta.

== Overview ==
Location of teams in Faroe Islands Premier League 2008

Team	City	Stadium	Capacity	Manager
B36	Tórshavn	Gundadalur	5,000	(Faroe Islands) Heðin Askham
B68	Toftir	Svangaskarð	1,200	(Faroe Islands) Jógvan Højgaard
B71	Sandur	Inni í Dal	300	(Faroe Islands) Eli Hentze
EB/Streymur	Streymnes	Við Margáir	1,000	(Faroe Islands) Sigfríður Clementsen
HB	Tórshavn	Gundadalur	5,000	(Faroe Islands) Rúni Nolsøe
ÍF	Fuglafjørður	Í Fløtugerði	3,000	(England) David R. Jones
KÍ	Klaksvík	Injector Arena	3,000	(Faroe Islands) Eyðun Klakkstein
NSÍ	Runavík	Við Løkin	2,000	(Faroe Islands) Jóhan Nielsen
Skála ÍF	Skáli	Undir Mýruhjalla	2,000	(Faroe Islands) John Petersen
Víkingur	Norðragøta	Sarpugerði	2,000	(Faroe Islands) Anton Skorðadal

== League table ==
Pos	Team	Pld	W	D	L	GF	GA	GD	Pts	Qualification or relegation
1	EB/Streymur (C)	27	17	4	6	54	33	+21	55	Qualification for the Champions League second qualifying round
2	HB	27	14	7	6	57	22	+35	49	Qualification for the Europa League second qualifying round (Note: Since EB/Streymur, winners of 2008 Faroe Islands Cup, also won the league, league runners-up HB Tórshavn earned a spot in the second qualifying round of the UEFA Europa League. 3rd placed B36 Tórshavn (also cup runners-up) and 4th placed NSÍ Runavík qualified for the first qualifying round of the UEFA Europa League.)
3	B36 Tórshavn	27	14	6	7	34	25	+9	48	Qualification for the Europa League first qualifying round
4	NSÍ Runavík	27	14	5	8	41	33	+8	47	Qualification for the Europa League first qualifying round
5	Víkingur Gøta	27	12	6	9	43	33	+10	42	
6	B68 Toftir	27	11	3	13	24	38	−14	36	
7	ÍF	27	9	4	14	32	46	−14	31	
8	KÍ	27	7	7	13	31	39	−8	28	
9	B71 Sandoy (R)	27	6	5	16	26	47	−21	23	Relegation to 1. deild
10	Skála IF (R)	27	4	7	16	22	48	−26	19	Relegation to 1. deild

Source: soccerandequipment.com
Rules for classification: 1) points; 2) goal difference; 3) number of goals scored.
(C) Champions; (R) Relegated

== Results ==
The schedule consisted of a total of 27 games. Each team played three games against every opponent in no particular order. At least one of the games was at home and one was away. The additional home game for every match-up was randomly assigned prior to the season.

=== Regular home games ===
Home \ Away	B36	B68	B71	EBS	HB	ÍF	KÍ	NSÍ	SKÁ	VÍK
B36 Tórshavn		2–1	1–0	1–1	2–0	4–0	1–0	1–1	0–0	2–1
B68 Toftir	0–1		0–3	0–3	0–0	0–1	1–1	0–2	0–2	1–0
B71 Sandoy	0–1	0–1		2–2	2–2	2–1	2–0	0–2	3–1	0–5
EB/Streymur	4–5	3–1	2–1		2–1	3–2	4–0	2–0	3–0	3–1
Havnar Bóltfelag	0–0	5–0	3–0	2–0		3–2	0–1	3–0	8–1	1–1
ÍF Fuglafjørður	1–0	1–3	3–1	2–0	1–0		2–2	0–3	1–0	1–3
KÍ Klaksvík	2–1	0–1	2–1	2–3	1–2	4–2		1–1	0–0	1–2
NSÍ Runavík	3–1	2–0	2–1	0–2	1–0	3–2	2–4		2–2	1–3
Skála IF	0–0	0–1	0–1	0–1	1–2	3–2	2–1	1–1		1–1
Víkingur Gøta	1–2	4–1	2–2	2–0	0–0	0–1	3–3	1–0	2–1	

Source: soccerandequipment.com
Legend: Blue = home team win; Yellow = draw; Red = away team win.

=== Additional home games ===
Home \ Away	B36	B68	B71	EBS	HB	ÍF	KÍ	NSÍ	SKÁ	VÍK
B36 Tórshavn			1–0	2–1		1–1			2–1	3–0
B68 Toftir	1–0				2–1		1–0	0–1		
B71 Sandoy		2–2		1–2					1–0	0–1
EB/Streymur		2–1			0–0 (Note: The three matches of Round 27 were suspended in the first half due to inclement weather. Their final scores were recorded as 0–0 with each team being given a point.)	0–1	4–2			2–1
Havnar Bóltfelag	3–0		6–0			2–0		3–1	6–1	
ÍF Fuglafjørður		1–3	0–0				1–0		1–1	
KÍ Klaksvík	2–0		2–1		0–0			0–1		
NSÍ Runavík	1–0		3–0	2–2		3–2			2–0	
Skála IF		1–2		1–3			1–0			1–2
Víkingur Gøta		0–1			3–4	2–0	0–0	2–1		

Source: soccerandequipment.com
Legend: Blue = home team win; Yellow = draw; Red = away team win.

== Top goalscorers ==
Source: soccerandequipment.com

20 goals

- (Faroe Islands) Arnbjørn Hansen (EB/Streymur)

15 goals

- (Faroe Islands) Andrew av Fløtum (HB Tórshavn)

12 goals

- (Faroe Islands) Hans Pauli Samuelsen (EB/Streymur)

11 goals

- (Brazil) Rodrigo Silva (KÍ Klaksvík)

9 goals

- (Faroe Islands) Bartal Eliasen (ÍF Fuglafjørður)
- (Hungary) Károly Potemkin (NSÍ Runavík)
- (Faroe Islands) Andreas Lava Olsen (Víkingur Gøta)

8 goals

- (Faroe Islands) Øssur Dalbúð (NSÍ Runavík)

7 goals

- (Faroe Islands) Jákup á Borg (B36 Tórshavn)
- (Brazil) Clayton Soares (B71 Sandoy)
- (Faroe Islands) Christian Høgni Jacobsen (HB Tórshavn)

== See also ==
- 2008 Faroe Islands Cup
