= 2003 1. deild =

Coordinates: 62.0167°N 6.7667°W

Faroe Islands Premier League Football
- Season: 2003
- Champions: HB
- Relegated: FS Vágar
- Matches played: 90
- Goals scored: 283 (3.14 per match)
- Biggest home win: KÍ 7–0 Skála
- Biggest away win: GÍ 0–4 HB
- Highest scoring: B36 7–1 KÍ

The 2003 1. deild was contested by 10 teams, and Havnar Bóltfelag won the championship.

== League standings ==
| Pos | Team | Pld | W | D | L | GF | GA | GD | Pts |
|---|---|---|---|---|---|---|---|---|---|
| 1 | Havnar Bóltfelag | 18 | 12 | 5 | 1 | 41 | 17 | +24 | 41 |
| 2 | B36 Tórshavn | 18 | 12 | 1 | 5 | 38 | 20 | +18 | 37 |
| 3 | B68 Toftir | 18 | 10 | 5 | 3 | 26 | 15 | +11 | 35 |
| 4 | NSÍ Runavík | 18 | 9 | 5 | 4 | 33 | 18 | +15 | 32 |
| 5 | KÍ Klaksvík | 18 | 7 | 3 | 8 | 29 | 30 | −1 | 24 |
| 6 | EB/Streymur | 18 | 6 | 6 | 6 | 33 | 36 | −3 | 24 |
| 7 | GÍ Gøta | 18 | 5 | 5 | 8 | 26 | 33 | −7 | 20 |
| 8 | VB Vágur | 18 | 4 | 4 | 10 | 16 | 30 | −14 | 16 |
| 9 | Skála ÍF | 18 | 4 | 0 | 14 | 16 | 39 | −23 | 12 |
| 10 | FS Vágar | 18 | 3 | 2 | 13 | 25 | 45 | −20 | 11 |

Rules for classification: 1st points, 2nd head-to-head, 3rd goals average

== Results ==
The schedule consisted of a total of 18 games. Each team played two games against every opponent in no particular order. One of the games was at home and one was away.

| Home \ Away | B36 | B68 | EBS | FSV | GÍG | HB | KÍ | NSÍ | SKÁ | VBV |
|---|---|---|---|---|---|---|---|---|---|---|
| B36 Tórshavn | | 0–2 | 1–3 | 4–1 | 4–0 | 0–2 | 7–1 | 2–0 | 2–1 | 2–1 |
| B68 Toftir | 1–0 | | 4–2 | 0–1 | 3–2 | 1–1 | 3–1 | 3–2 | 1–0 | 2–0 |
| EB/Streymur | 3–1 | 2–2 | | 4–2 | 4–2 | 1–1 | 0–1 | 1–1 | 2–0 | 2–0 |
| FS Vágar | 1–4 | 0–2 | 1–1 | | 1–2 | 2–3 | 3–1 | 1–2 | 3–4 | 2–3 |
| GÍ Gøta | 1–4 | 0–0 | 4–4 | 2–2 | | 0–4 | 0–1 | 1–1 | 2–1 | 3–0 |
| HB | 1–2 | 2–0 | 5–0 | 3–1 | 2–2 | | 3–2 | 1–0 | 3–0 | 0–0 |
| KÍ | 1–2 | 0–0 | 4–1 | 2–0 | 1–0 | 1–2 | | 2–2 | 7–0 | 2–2 |
| NSÍ Runavík | 1–2 | 1–1 | 3–0 | 2–0 | 1–0 | 2–2 | 4–0 | | 2–0 | 4–0 |
| Skála ÍF | 0–1 | 0–1 | 3–2 | 4–1 | 0–2 | 1–3 | 0–2 | 1–3 | | 1–0 |
| VB Vágur | 0–0 | 1–0 | 1–1 | 2–3 | 0–3 | 2–3 | 1–0 | 1–2 | 2–0 | |

Source: www.faroesoccer.com
Legend: Blue = home team win; Yellow = draw; Red = away team win.

== Top goalscorers ==
Source: faroesoccer.com

13 goals

- (Faroe Islands) Hjalgrím Elttør (KÍ)

10 goals

- (Faroe Islands) Andrew av Fløtum (HB)

9 goals

- (Faroe Islands) Heðin á Lakjuni (B36)
- (Faroe Islands) John Petersen (B36)
- (Romania) Sorin Anghel (EB/Streymur)

7 goals

- (Faroe Islands) Birgir Jørgensen (VB Vágur/VB)
- (Brazil) Clayton Nascimento (FS Vágar)
- (Faroe Islands) Helgi L. Petersen (NSÍ)
- (Faroe Islands) Jákup á Borg (B36)
- (Faroe Islands) Rógvi Jacobsen (HB)
- (Faroe Islands) Tór-Ingar Akselsen (HB)
