= 2001 1. deild =

Coordinates: 62.0167°N 6.7667°W

Faroe Islands Premier League Football
- Season: 2001
- Champions: B36
- Relegated: FS Vágar
- Matches played: 90
- Goals scored: 330 (3.67 per match)
- Biggest home win: B36 15–0 FS Vágar
- Biggest away win: B71 0–7 GÍ
- Highest scoring: B36 15–0 FS Vágar

In 2001, 1. deild was the top-tier league in Faroe Islands football (since 2005, the top tier has been the Faroe Islands Premier League, with 1. deild becoming the second tier).

Statistics of 1. deild in the 2001 season.

== Overview ==
It was contested by 10 teams, and B36 Tórshavn won the championship.

== League standings ==
Pos	Team	Pld	W	D	L	GF	GA	GD	Pts
1	B36 Tórshavn	18	15	1	2	55	15	+40	46
2	GÍ Gøta	18	13	3	2	53	20	+33	42
3	B68 Toftir	18	9	4	5	39	25	+14	31
4	VB Vágur	18	9	3	6	43	24	+19	30
5	NSÍ Runavík	18	8	4	6	23	21	+2	28
6	KÍ Klaksvík	18	8	1	9	27	38	−11	25
7	Havnar Bóltfelag	18	7	2	9	34	25	+9	23
8	EB/Streymur	18	5	1	12	20	34	−14	16
9	B71 Sandur	18	3	1	14	17	52	−35	10
10	FS Vágar	18	3	0	15	19	76	−57	9

Rules for classification: 1st points, 2nd head-to-head, 3rd goals average

== Results ==
The schedule consisted of a total of 18 games. Each team played two games against every opponent in no particular order. One of the games was at home and one was away.

Home \ Away	B36	B68	B71	EBS	FSV	GÍG	HB	KÍ	NSÍ	VBV
B36 Tórshavn		1–0	4–1	5–1	15–0	3–1	1–0	5–0	1–0	3–2
B68 Toftir	0–2		4–2	1–0	5–1	2–2	2–1	4–0	2–1	1–4
B71 Sandoy	2–5	0–5		1–0	0–1	0–7	3–2	1–2	0–2	1–3
EB/Streymur	0–2	1–2	1–2		3–2	1–1	0–4	4–2	1–0	1–3
FS Vágar	1–2	1–6	2–1	1–3		1–4	1–4	0–2	1–2	3–2
GÍ Gøta	3–1	2–0	3–0	4–0	8–2		3–2	5–1	0–1	1–1
HB	1–2	3–1	0–0	1–0	8–2	2–3		1–2	0–0	2–1
KÍ	1–2	2–2	2–0	0–4	2–0	1–2	0–2		2–1	4–1
NSÍ Runavík	0–0	1–1	3–2	2–0	3–0	1–2	2–1	3–2		1–1
VB Vágur	2–1	1–1	6–1	1–0	6–0	1–2	2–0	1–2	5–0	

Source: www.faroesoccer.com
Legend: Blue = home team win; Yellow = draw; Red = away team win.

== Top goalscorers ==
Source: faroesoccer.com

Rank	Player	Club	Goals
1	(Faroe Islands) Helgi L. Petersen	GÍ	19
2	(Faroe Islands) John Petersen	B36	15 (1)
3	(Faroe Islands) Fróði Benjaminsen	B68	13
4	(Faroe Islands) Birgir Jørgensen	VB	12
4	(Faroe Islands) Heðin á Lakjuni	B36	12
6	(Faroe Islands) Súni Fríði Barbá	B68	9 (1)
7	(Faroe Islands) Jákup á Borg	B36	7 (2)
7	(Poland) Krzysztof Popczyński	VB	9
7	(Faroe Islands) Kurt Mørkøre	KÍ	9
7	(Romania) Sorin Anghel	EB/Streymur	8 (1)
