= 2007 Faroe Islands Cup =

Tournament details
- Country: Faroe Islands
- Teams: 20

Final positions
- Champions: EB/Streymur
- Runners-up: Havnar Bóltfelag

Tournament statistics
- Matches played: 21
- Goals scored: 88 (4.19 per match)
- Top goal scorer(s): Atli Petersen; Vincent Jacobsen; Sjúrður Ellefsen; Ronnie Samuelsen (4 goals each)

The 2007 Faroe Islands Cup was played between 10 March and 15 August 2007 and it was won by EB/Streymur. It was the first time they won the cup.

Only the first teams of Faroese football clubs were allowed to participate. The First Round involved teams from the third and fourth divisions. Teams from the highest two divisions entered the competition in the Second Round.

== First round ==
The matches were played on 10 and 11 March 2007.

Team 1	Score	Team 2
FS Vágar	8–1	NÍF Nolsoy
TB Tvøroyri	2–0	B68 Toftir
Undri FF	3–2 (a.e.t.)	MB Miðvágur
Leirvík ÍF	3–0	Fram Tórshavn

== Second round ==
The matches were played between 17 March and 25 April 2007.

Team 1	Score	Team 2
Skála IF	1–0	FS Vágar
B36 Tórshavn	1–3	AB Argir
TB Tvøroyri	4–0	SÍ Sørvágur
NSÍ Runavík	1–2 (a.e.t.)	HB Tórshavn
ÍF Fuglafjørður	11–1	Undri FF
EB Streymur	4–1	B71 Sandur
Leirvík ÍF	1–3	VB Sumba
GÍ Gøta	1–4	KI Klaksvik

== Quarter-finals ==
The matches were played on 17 May 2007.

Team 1	Score	Team 2
EB Streymur	4–4 (a.e.t.); 5–4 (p)	ÍF Fuglafjørður
HB Tórshavn	4–0	AB Argir
KI Klaksvik	0–0 (a.e.t.); 5–6 (p)	Skála IF
VB/Sumba	3–1	TB Tvøroyri

== Semi-finals ==
The first legs were played on 13 June and the second legs on 11 July 2007.

Team 1	Agg.	Team 2	1st leg	2nd leg
HB Tórshavn	4–1	VB/Sumba	3–1	1–0
Skála ÍF	0–3	EB Streymur	0–2	0–1

== Final ==
15 August 2007
18:00

EB Streymur	4–3	HB Tórshavn
Anghel 3' (pen.); H. P. Samuelsen 6'; A. Hansen 21'; Potemkin 79'	Report	Joensen 77'; Jacobsen 80'; Mortensen 85'

Gundadalur, Tórshavn
Referee: Eiler Rasmussen

== Top goalscorers ==
Player	Team	Goals
(Faroe Islands) Atli Petersen	ÍF Fuglafjørður	4
(Faroe Islands) Vincent Jacobsen	ÍF Fuglafjørður	4
(Faroe Islands) Sjúrður Ellefsen	FS Vágar 2004	4
(Faroe Islands) Ronnie Samuelsen	EB/Streymur	4

== See also ==
- Faroe Islands Super Cup
