= Heðin á Lakjuni =

Faroese footballer (born 1978)

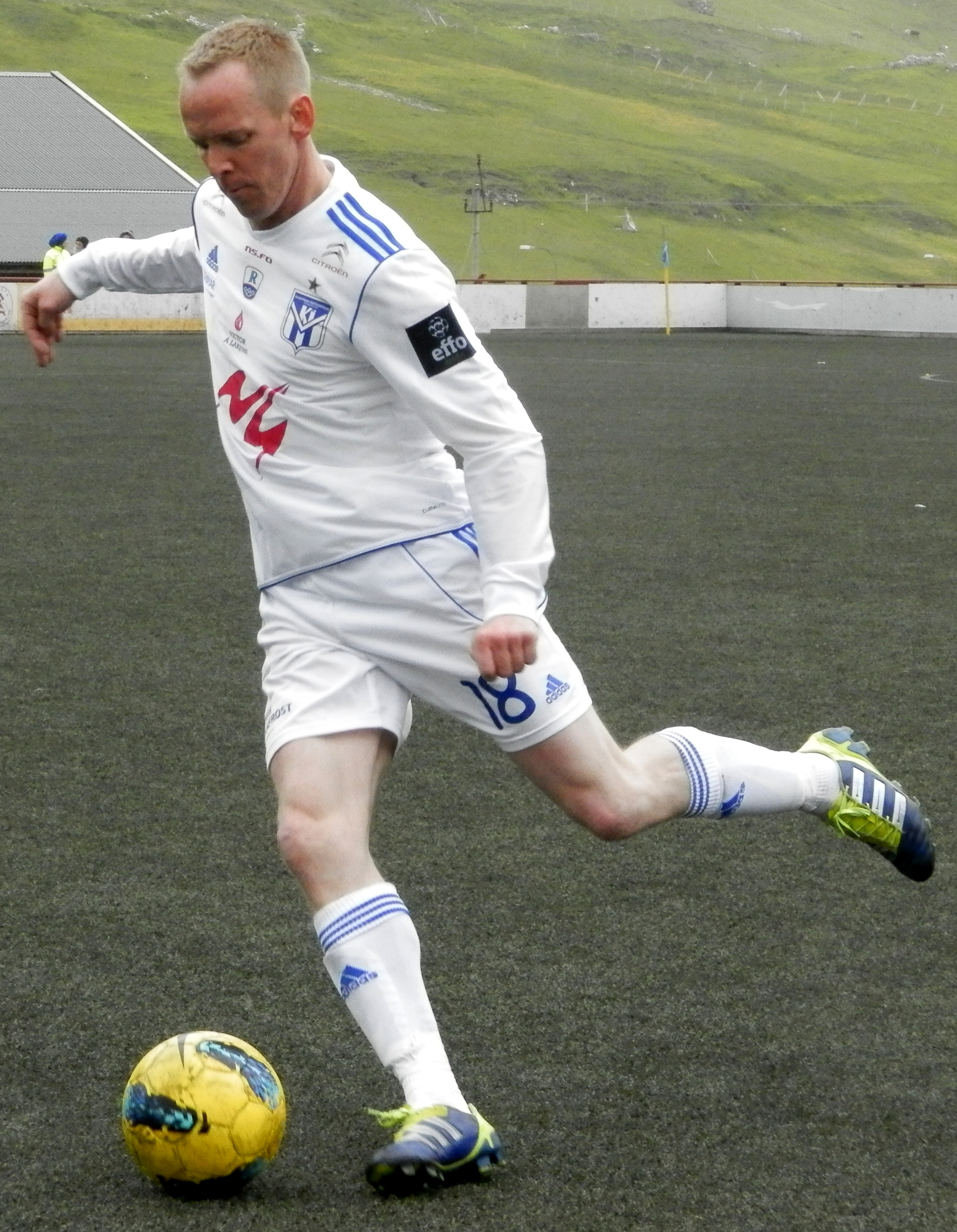
- Heðin á Lakjuni playing for KÍ in 2012.

Personal information
- Full name: Heðin á Lakjuni
- Date of birth: 19 February 1978 (age 48)
- Place of birth: Klaksvík, Faroe Islands
- Height: 1.79 m (5 ft 10 1/2 in)
- Positions: Full-back; winger

Team information
- Current team: KÍ Klaksvík
- Number: 18

Senior career*
| Years | Team | Apps | (Gls) |
| 1995–2000 | KÍ Klaksvík | 91 | (31) |
| 2001 | B36 Tórshavn | 18 | (12) |
| 2002 | KÍ Klaksvík | 11 | (8) |
| 2003 | B36 Tórshavn | 18 | (9) |
| 2004 | HB Tórshavn | 17 | (7) |
| 2005–2009 | KÍ Klaksvík | 119 | (25) |
| 2010–2011 | NSÍ Runavík | 50 | (9) |
| 2012–2015 | KÍ Klaksvík | 87 | (6) |

International career^{‡}
| 1999–2005 | Faroe Islands | 16 | (1) |
- * Club domestic league appearances and goals as of 20 November 2015 ‡ National team caps and goals as of 20 November 2015

Heðin á Lakjuni (born 19 February 1978) is a former Faroese international footballer, who played as a full-back and a winger for four Faroese clubs in the top tier. Lakjuni started his career with KÍ Klaksvík and had spells with B36 Tórshavn, HB Tórshavn, and NSÍ Runavík. He has won the Faroe Islands Premier League 3 times, and the Faroe Islands Cup 4 times. Since April 2015 he holds the record for most league appearances with 417 matches in the Faroe Islands Premier League. He scored 100 goals in the Faroe Islands Premier League. Lakjuni has celebrated domestic doubles with three different teams (KÍ, B36, and HB).

After making his debut for the Faroe Islands in 1999, Lakjuni has been capped for the team 16 times and scored once.

== Club career ==
Lakjuni started his career with KÍ Klaksvík in 1995. After playing in the club's reserve teams, he made his first team debut against GÍ. He also managed to score his first goal for KÍ, during the campaign, to help his team win 4–3 against B68. Lakjuni was a member of the KÍ squad that won the double in 1999. Following the conclusion of the 2000 season with KÍ, Lakjuni transferred to B36 Tórshavn. In the 2001 Faroese Cup final Lakjuni faced his former team, and created the opportunity that helped his teammate Jens Kristian Hansen score the match's only goal. At the end of the season Lakjuni celebrated his second double, as B36 won the championship. After one season with B36, Lakjuni returned to KÍ Klaksvík. His second spell at KÍ was short; after one season he signed for a second time with B36. He was a starter in the 2003 Faroese Cup final, helping his team win the trophy after a 3–1 victory against GÍ Gøta. By winning the 2003 championship he achieved yet another double.

On 29 December 2003 he signed for HB Tórshavn. Lakjuni was a starter in the 2004 cup final for HB, helping his team to win NSÍ Runavík 1–3 in Tórsvøllur. After winning the 2004 league title with HB, Lakjuni returned to KÍ in October 2004. He left KÍ for NSÍ Runavík in February 2010. He made his debut for the club in a cup match against EB/Streymur. In January 2012 he returned to KÍ to have his fourth spell with the club. In October 2014, Lakjuni was set to make his 400th appearance in the Faroe Islands Premier League; at the time he was the second only to Egil á Bø in appearances among active players. In April 2015, by making his 408th appearance in the Faroe Islands Premier League, he surpassed Egil á Bø and set the record for most league appearances. In May 2015, he scored his 100th goal in the top tier of Faroese football, helping his team get past FC Suðuroy 2–1 at home.

== International careers ==
Although he received his first call-up in the senior squad by Allan Simonsen in 1997, Lakjuni made his debut for the Faroe Islands in March 1999, in an away 0–0 friendly draw against Andorra. His competitive debut came almost six months later when he came in as a substitute for Henning Jarnskor in a Euro 2000 qualifiers match against Lithuania. He scored his first and only goal in a friendly 3–2 win against Kazakhstan in 2003, following an assist by Hjalgrím Elttør. Totally he has appeared in 16 matches for the Faroe Islands.

=== International goal ===
Scores and results list Faroe Islands' goal tally first.

| # | Date | Venue | Opponent | Score | Result | Competition | Reference |
|---|---|---|---|---|---|---|---|
| 1 | 27 April 2003 | Svangaskarð, Toftir, Faroe Islands | Kazakhstan | 3–0 | 3–2 | Friendly | |

== Honours ==
KÍ Klaksvík

- Faroe Islands Premier League: 1999
- Faroe Islands Cup: 1999

B36 Tórshavn

- Faroe Islands Premier League: 2003
- Faroe Islands Cup: 2001, 2003

HB Tórshavn

- Faroe Islands Premier League: 2004
- Faroe Islands Cup: 2004
