= 2012 Faroe Islands Premier League =

Faroe Islands Premier League
- Season: 2012
- Champions: EB/Streymur
- Relegated: B68 Toftir; Suðuroy
- Champions League: EB/Streymur
- Europa League: ÍF Fuglafjørður; HB Tórshavn; Víkingur (via domestic cup)
- Matches: 135
- Goals: 412 (3.05 per match)
- Top goalscorer: (Brazil) Clayton Soares do Nascimento, (Faroe Islands) Páll Klettskarð (ÍF, KÍ 22 goals)
- Biggest home win: HB 6–0 Suðuroy (R13); KÍ 7–1 Suðuroy (R27)
- Biggest away win: Suðuroy 0–6 ÍF (R9)
- Highest scoring: KÍ 7–1 Suðuroy (R27)

2012 Faroe Islands Premier League was the seventieth season of top-tier football on the Faroe Islands. For sponsorship reasons, it was known as Effodeildin. The season began on 24 March 2012 with a match between B36 Tórshavn and FC Suðuroy, and ended on 6 October 2012. EB/Streymur won their second league title. B36 Tórshavn were the defending champions.

== Teams ==
07 Vestur and B71 Sandoy had finished 9th and 10th respectively at the end of the previous season and were relegated to the 1. deild as a result. 07 Vestur were relegated after just one season in the league while B71 Sandoy left after a two-year stay.

Replacing them were the 1. deild champions FC Suðuroy and runners-up TB Tvøroyri. FC Suðuroy returned to the top flight after a one-year absence, while TB Tvøroyri returned after a six-year absence.

=== Team summaries ===
Geographical location of the 2012 Faroese Premier League teams

| Team | City | Stadium | Capacity | Manager |
|---|---|---|---|---|
| B36 Tórshavn | Tórshavn | Gundadalur | 5,000 | (Faroe Islands) Mikkjal Thomassen |
| B68 Toftir | Toftir | Svangaskarð | 6,000 | (Faroe Islands) Pauli Poulsen (Faroe Islands) Bill McLeod Jacobsen |
| EB/Streymur | Streymnes | við Margáir | 1,000 | (Faroe Islands) Heðin Askham |
| Havnar Bóltfelag | Tórshavn | Gundadalur | 5,000 | (Faroe Islands) Sigfríður Clementsen |
| ÍF Fuglafjørður | Fuglafjørður | í Fløtugerði | 3,000 | (Denmark) Flemming Christensen |
| KÍ Klaksvík | Klaksvík | Við Djúpumýrar | 3,000 | (Iceland) Páll Guðlaugsson |
| NSÍ Runavík | Runavík | Við Løkin | 2,000 | (Faroe Islands) Kári Reynheim |
| FC Suðuroy | Vágur | á Eiðinum | 3,000 | (Faroe Islands) Pól F. Joensen (Slovenia) Saša Kolman |
| TB Tvøroyri | Tvøroyri | Við Stórá | 4,000 | (Serbia) Milan Kuljić |
| Víkingur Gøta | Norðragøta | Sarpugerði | 3,000 | (Faroe Islands) Jógvan Martin Olsen |

== League table ==
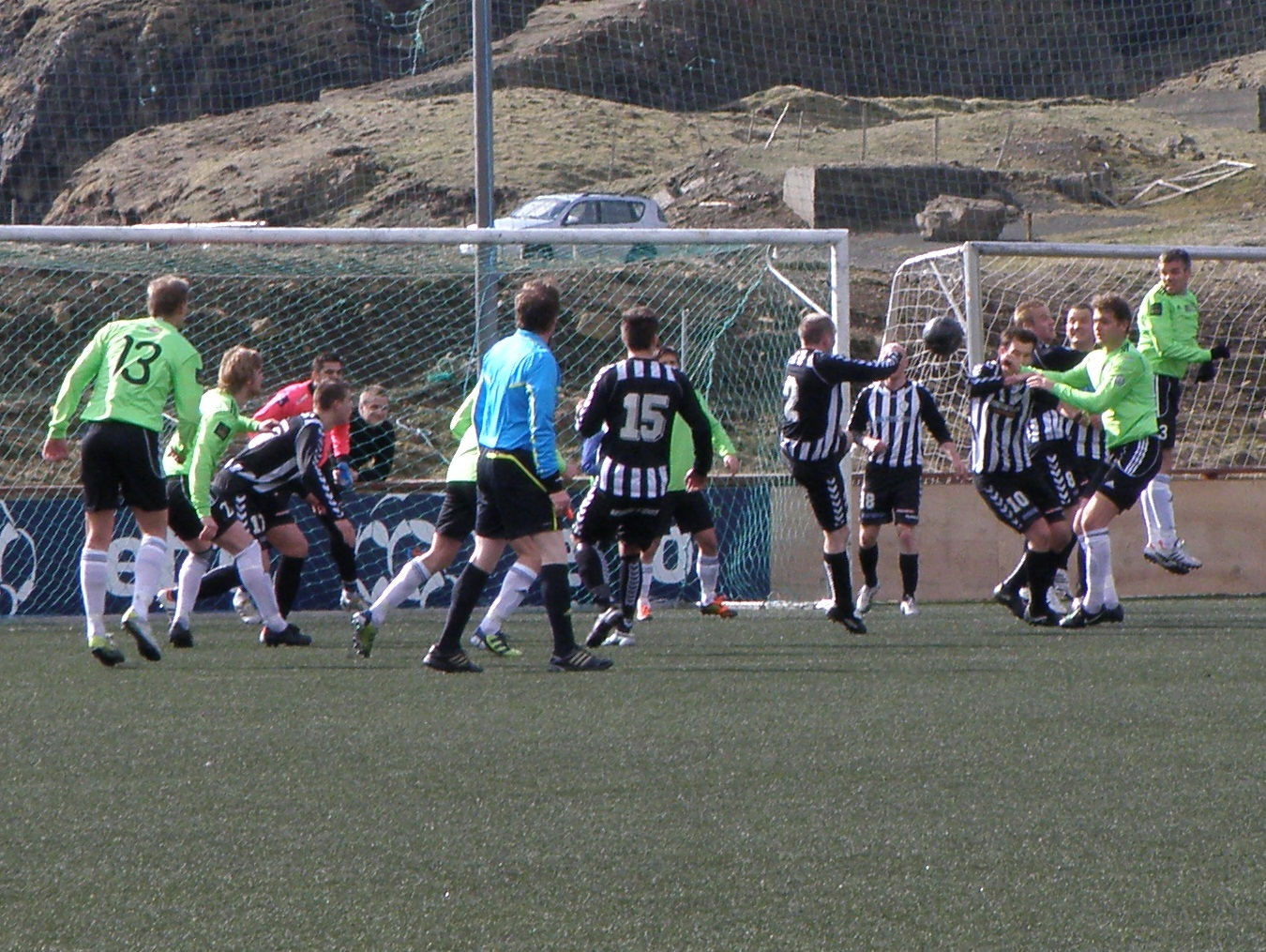
TB Tvøroyri vs. B36 Tórshavn on 15 April 2012.

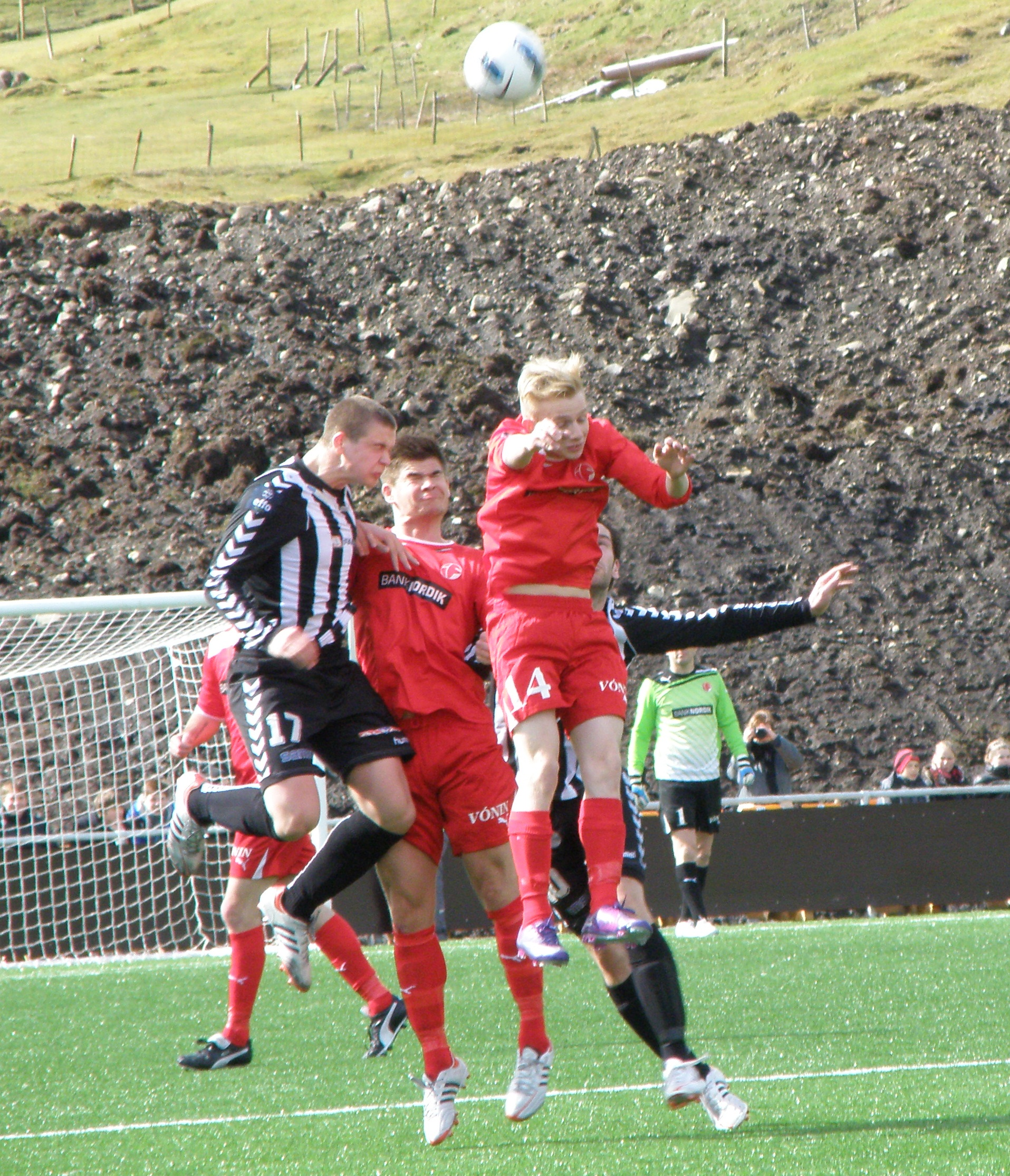
TB Tvøroyri vs. ÍF Fuglafjørður in 6. round on 29 April 2012, the first match on TB's new stadium Við Stórá.

| Pos | Team | Pld | W | D | L | GF | GA | GD | Pts | Qualification or relegation |
|---|---|---|---|---|---|---|---|---|---|---|
| 1 | EB/Streymur (C) | 27 | 17 | 7 | 3 | 51 | 25 | +26 | 58 | Qualification for the Champions League first qualifying round |
| 2 | ÍF | 27 | 16 | 6 | 5 | 55 | 23 | +32 | 54 | Qualification for the Europa League first qualifying round |
| 3 | HB | 27 | 13 | 6 | 8 | 56 | 34 | +22 | 45 | Qualification for the Europa League first qualifying round |
| 4 | KÍ | 27 | 13 | 6 | 8 | 59 | 44 | +15 | 45 | |
| 5 | Víkingur Gøta | 27 | 12 | 9 | 6 | 43 | 35 | +8 | 45 | Qualification for the Europa League first qualifying round (Note: Víkingur, winners of the 2012 Faroe Islands Cup, qualified for the first qualifying round of the UEFA Europa League.) |
| 6 | B36 Tórshavn | 27 | 10 | 8 | 9 | 42 | 36 | +6 | 38 | |
| 7 | NSÍ Runavík | 27 | 9 | 4 | 14 | 36 | 43 | −7 | 31 | |
| 8 | TB | 27 | 5 | 9 | 13 | 30 | 50 | −20 | 24 | |
| 9 | B68 Toftir (R) | 27 | 6 | 6 | 15 | 23 | 43 | −20 | 24 | Relegation to 1. deild |
| 10 | Suðuroy (R) | 27 | 2 | 3 | 22 | 16 | 78 | −62 | 9 | Relegation to 1. deild |

Source: Soccerway
Rules for classification: 1) points; 2) goal difference; 3) number of goals scored.
(C) Champions; (R) Relegated

=== Positions by round ===
| Team ╲ Round | 1 | 2 | 3 | 4 | 5 | 6 | 7 | 8 | 9 | 10 | 11 | 12 | 13 | 14 | 15 | 16 | 17 | 18 | 19 | 20 | 21 | 22 | 23 | 24 | 25 | 26 | 27 |
|---|---|---|---|---|---|---|---|---|---|---|---|---|---|---|---|---|---|---|---|---|---|---|---|---|---|---|---|
| EB/Streymur | 5 | 6 | 6 | 5 | 5 | 5 | 3 | 3 | 2 | 1 | 1 | 1 | 1 | 1 | 1 | 2 | 2 | 1 | 1 | 1 | 1 | 1 | 1 | 2 | 1 | 1 | 1 |
| ÍF | 3 | 2 | 3 | 2 | 4 | 4 | 5 | 5 | 3 | 4 | 3 | 4 | 5 | 5 | 4 | 4 | 3 | 3 | 2 | 2 | 2 | 2 | 2 | 1 | 2 | 2 | 2 |
| HB | 1 | 1 | 2 | 4 | 2 | 2 | 2 | 2 | 5 | 3 | 4 | 5 | 4 | 4 | 5 | 5 | 5 | 5 | 5 | 5 | 5 | 5 | 5 | 5 | 4 | 3 | 3 |
| KÍ | 5 | 7 | 7 | 8 | 8 | 7 | 6 | 6 | 4 | 5 | 5 | 3 | 3 | 2 | 2 | 1 | 1 | 2 | 3 | 4 | 3 | 3 | 3 | 3 | 3 | 5 | 4 |
| Víkingur Gøta | 2 | 2 | 1 | 2 | 1 | 1 | 1 | 1 | 1 | 2 | 2 | 2 | 2 | 3 | 3 | 3 | 4 | 4 | 4 | 3 | 4 | 4 | 4 | 4 | 5 | 4 | 5 |
| B36 Tórshavn | 4 | 4 | 4 | 1 | 3 | 3 | 4 | 4 | 6 | 6 | 6 | 6 | 6 | 6 | 6 | 6 | 6 | 6 | 6 | 6 | 6 | 6 | 6 | 6 | 6 | 6 | 6 |
| NSÍ Runavík | 7 | 5 | 5 | 6 | 7 | 9 | 9 | 9 | 9 | 8 | 9 | 8 | 8 | 8 | 8 | 7 | 7 | 7 | 7 | 7 | 7 | 7 | 7 | 7 | 7 | 7 | 7 |
| TB | 9 | 9 | 9 | 10 | 9 | 8 | 8 | 7 | 7 | 7 | 7 | 7 | 7 | 7 | 7 | 8 | 9 | 9 | 9 | 9 | 9 | 9 | 9 | 8 | 8 | 8 | 8 |
| B68 Toftir | 10 | 10 | 10 | 7 | 6 | 6 | 7 | 8 | 8 | 9 | 8 | 9 | 9 | 9 | 9 | 9 | 8 | 8 | 8 | 8 | 8 | 8 | 8 | 9 | 9 | 9 | 9 |
| Suðuroy | 8 | 8 | 8 | 9 | 10 | 10 | 10 | 10 | 10 | 10 | 10 | 10 | 10 | 10 | 10 | 10 | 10 | 10 | 10 | 10 | 10 | 10 | 10 | 10 | 10 | 10 | 10 |

Source: kicker.de (in German)

== Results ==
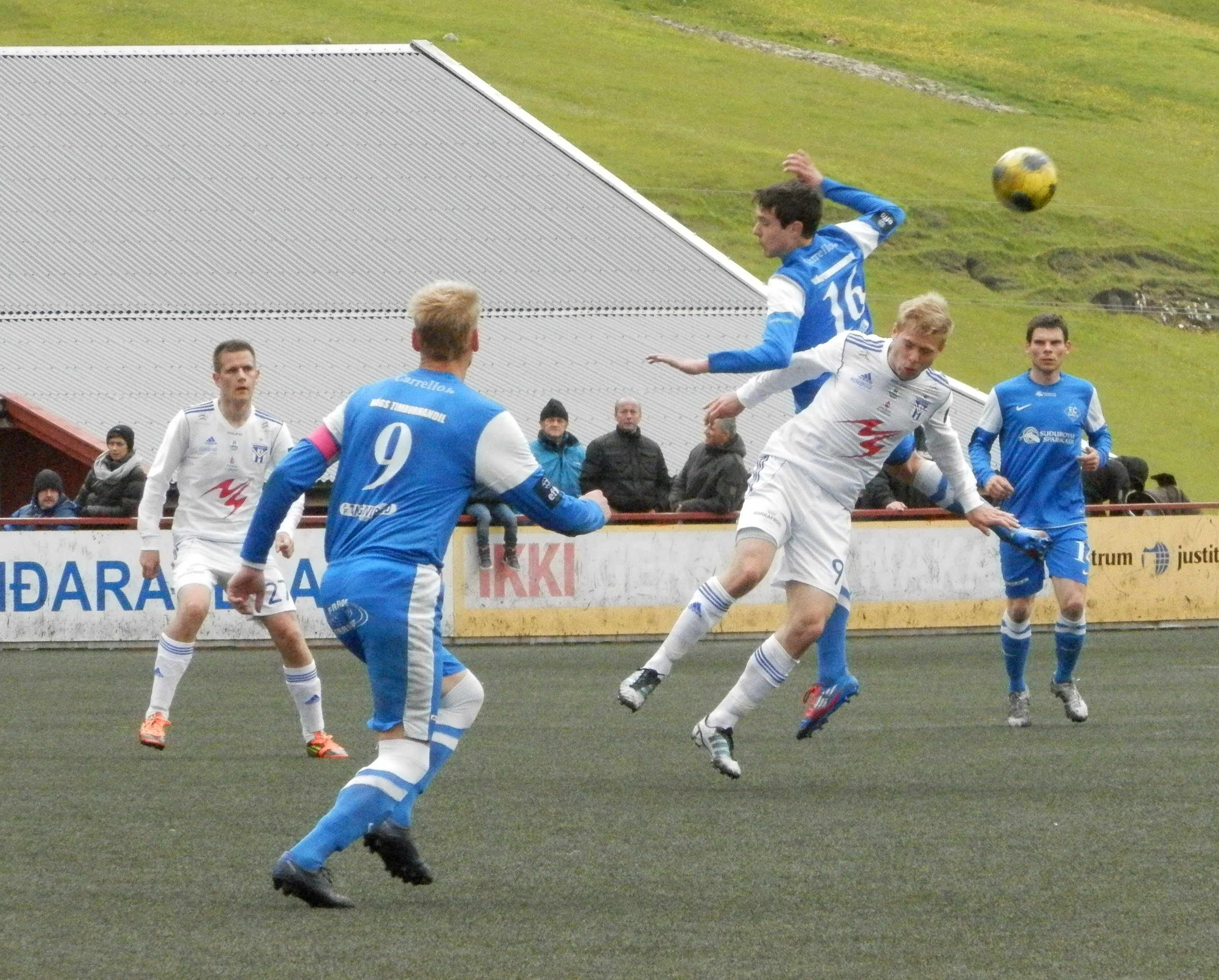
FC Suðuroy vs. KÍ Klaksvík in the 15. round on 30. June 2012.

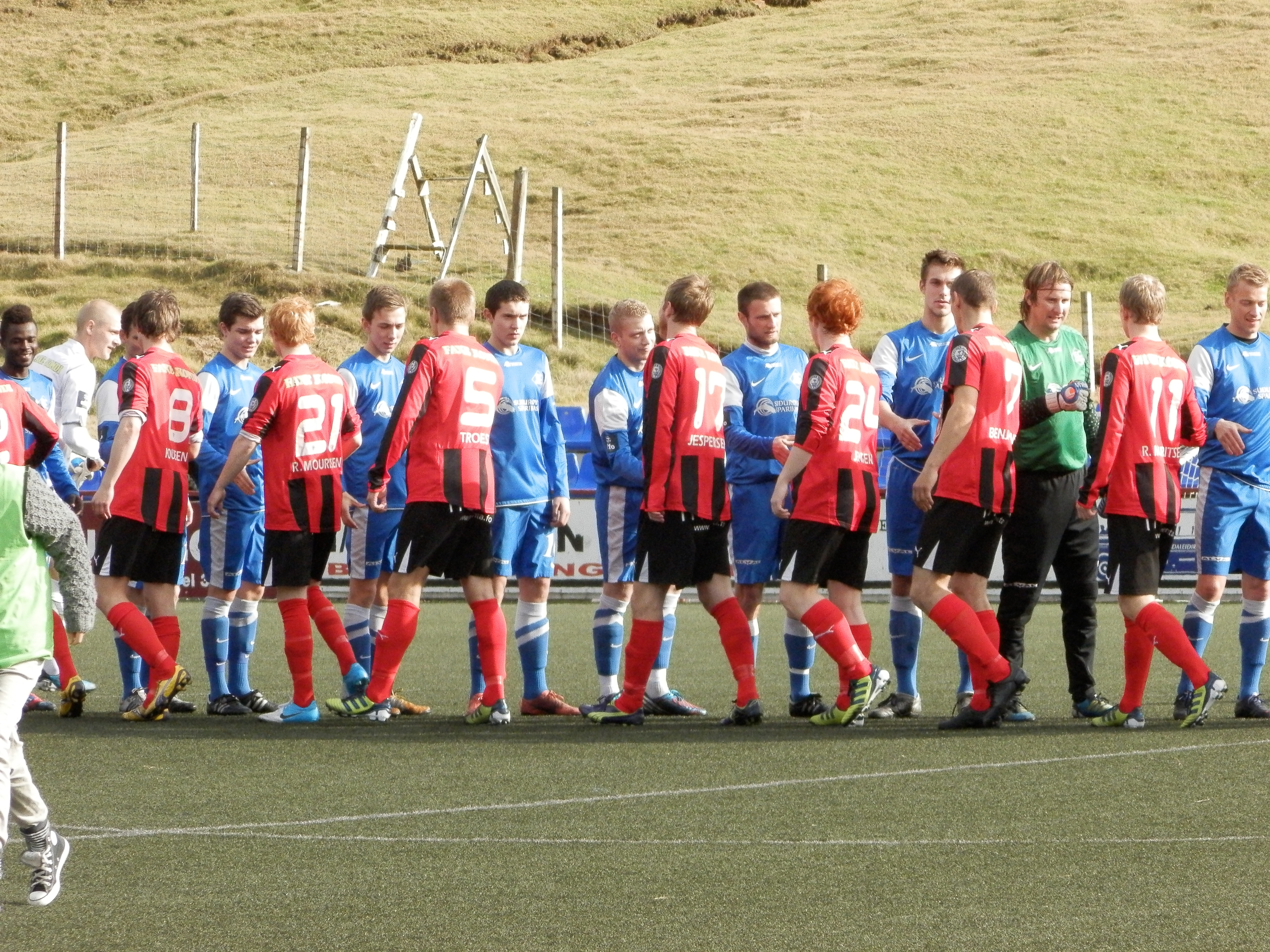
FC Suðuroy vs. HB Tórshavn, just before the match on 23 September 2012. HB won 4–0.

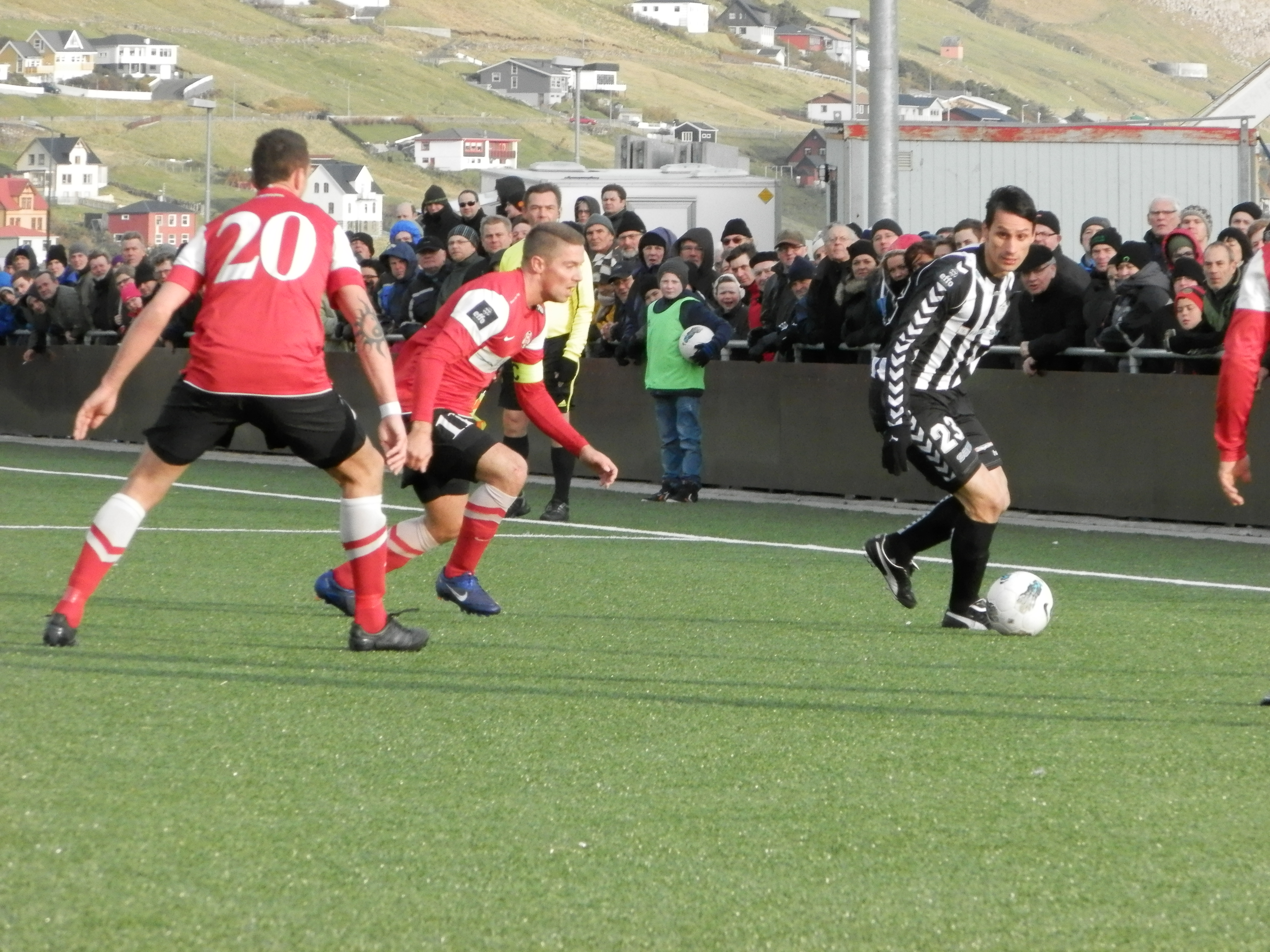
TB Tvøroyri vs. B68 Toftir in the final round of the Faroe Islands Premier League 2012. B68 Toftir won 4–1, but it was not enough in order not to get relegated, they needed to win with four goals.

The schedule consisted of a total of 27 rounds. Each team played three games against every opponent in no particular order. At least one of the games had to be at home and at least one had to be away. The additional home game for every match-up was randomly assigned prior to the season, with the top five teams of the previous season having 5 home games.

=== Regular home games ===
| Home \ Away | B36 | B68 | EBS | HB | ÍF | KÍ | NSÍ | SUÐ | TB | VÍK |
|---|---|---|---|---|---|---|---|---|---|---|
| B36 Tórshavn | | 1–2 | 1–2 | 1–0 | 1–1 | 2–3 | 5–1 | 1–0 | 2–2 | 3–0 |
| B68 Toftir | 1–1 | | 1–2 | 1–2 | 0–2 | 0–2 | 3–2 | 2–0 | 1–1 | 1–1 |
| EB/Streymur | 1–1 | 0–0 | | 2–2 | 2–1 | 1–1 | 1–0 | 3–0 | 1–1 | 0–1 |
| Havnar Bóltfelag | 2–1 | 4–0 | 0–1 | | 1–4 | 5–0 | 2–4 | 6–0 | 4–1 | 1–1 |
| ÍF Fuglafjørður | 1–1 | 2–0 | 1–2 | 2–0 | | 2–0 | 2–1 | 3–2 | 1–1 | 1–2 |
| KÍ Klaksvík | 0–2 | 3–0 | 1–3 | 1–1 | 1–0 | | 3–2 | 5–1 | 0–0 | 3–3 |
| NSÍ Runavík | 3–1 | 0–2 | 1–0 | 2–4 | 1–2 | 0–2 | | 0–0 | 2–0 | 0–2 |
| Suðuroy | 0–2 | 0–1 | 0–2 | 0–1 | 0–6 | 1–4 | 0–2 | | 1–1 | 1–1 |
| TB Tvøroyri | 1–4 | 3–1 | 0–3 | 4–2 | 1–0 | 1–6 | 1–3 | 3–0 | | 0–2 |
| Víkingur Gøta | 3–2 | 2–0 | 2–1 | 2–2 | 1–4 | 0–1 | 1–1 | 4–0 | 1–0 | |

Source: Soccerway
Legend: Blue = home team win; Yellow = draw; Red = away team win.

=== Additional home games ===
| Home \ Away | B36 | B68 | EBS | HB | ÍF | KÍ | NSÍ | SUÐ | TB | VÍK |
|---|---|---|---|---|---|---|---|---|---|---|
| B36 Tórshavn | | 1–0 | 1–4 | | 0–2 | | | 3–1 | | 1–1 |
| B68 Toftir | | | 0–1 | | 0–0 | 1–3 | 1–1 | | | |
| EB/Streymur | | | | 3–2 | | 1–1 | 4–0 | 4–2 | 3–2 | |
| Havnar Bóltfelag | 2–0 | 4–0 | | | | | | | 3–1 | 0–0 |
| ÍF Fuglafjørður | | | 1–1 | 0–0 | | 5–2 | 3–1 | | | |
| KÍ Klaksvík | 3–4 | | | 1–2 | | | 2–1 | 7–1 | 1–1 | |
| NSÍ Runavík | 0–0 | | | 2–0 | | | | 5–1 | 0–1 | 1–0 |
| Suðuroy | | 2–1 | | 0–4 | 1–4 | | | | 1–0 | |
| TB Tvøroyri | 0–0 | 1–4 | | | 1–2 | | | | | 2–2 |
| Víkingur Gøta | | 2–0 | 2–3 | | 0–3 | 4–3 | | 3–1 | | |

Source: Soccerway
Legend: Blue = home team win; Yellow = draw; Red = away team win.

== Top goalscorers ==
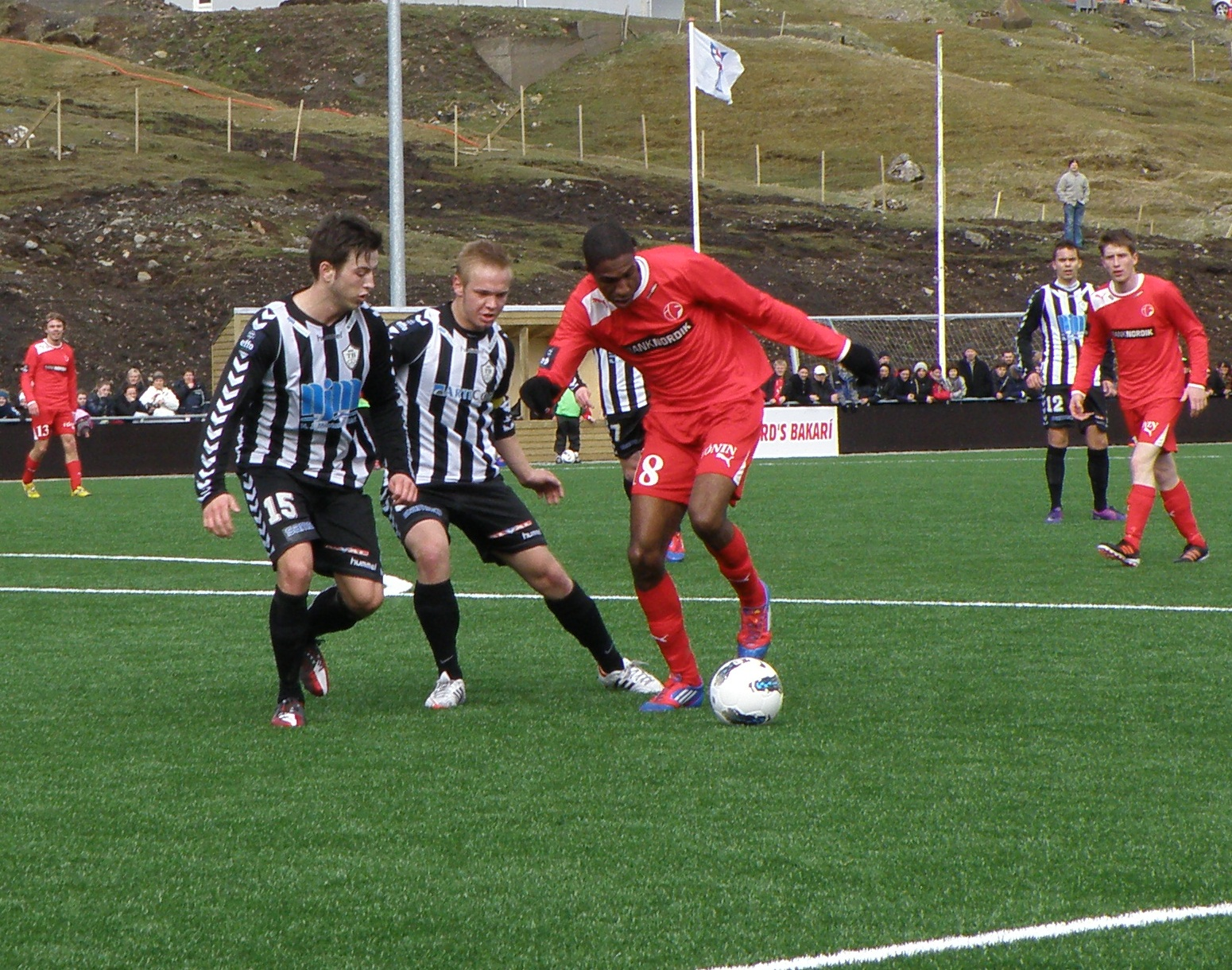
Clayton Sorares do Nascimento (number 8 in red/white) was one of two top goalscorers 2012.

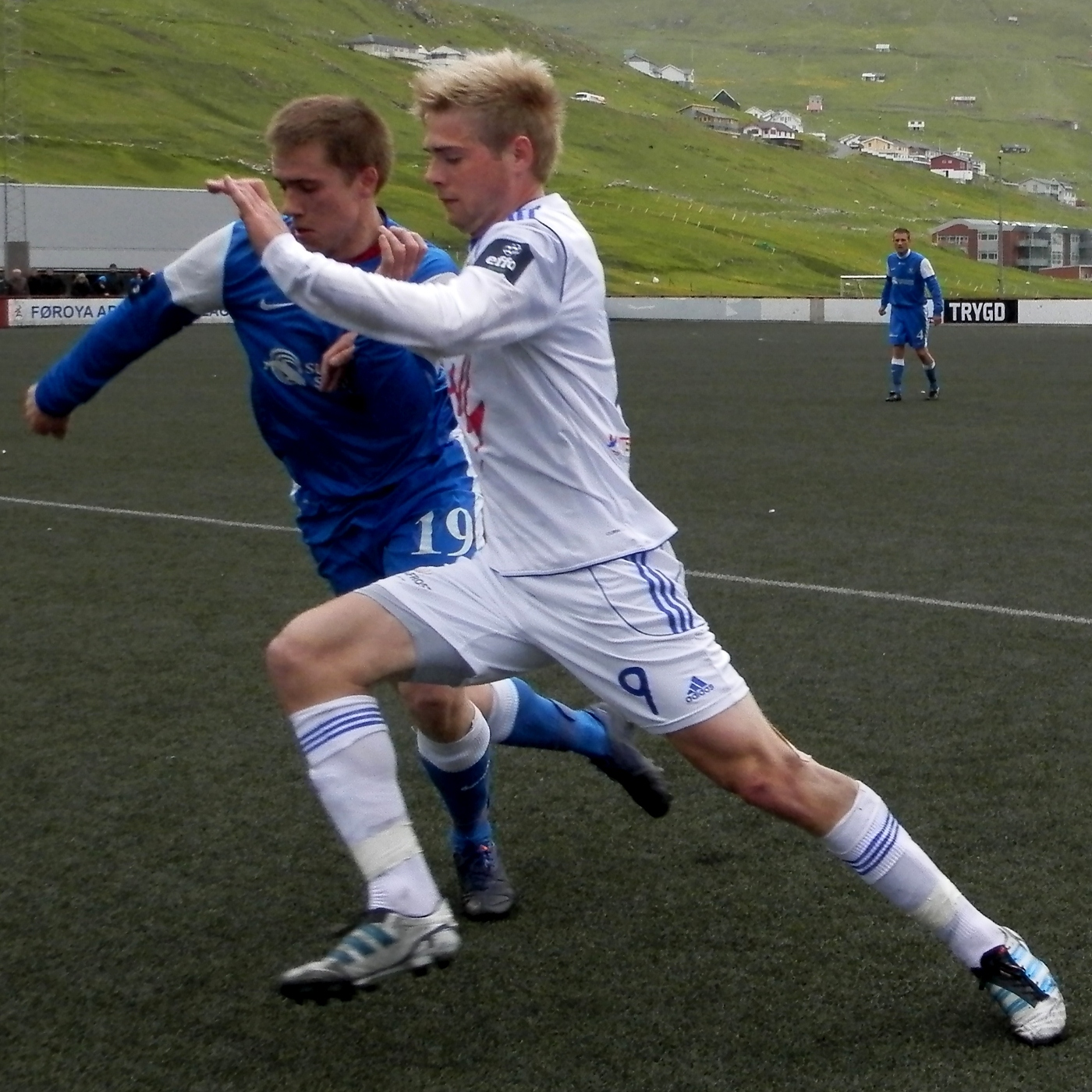
Páll Klettskarð (number 9 in white) was one of the top goalscorers 2012).

| Rank | Player | Club | Goals |
|---|---|---|---|
| 1 | (Brazil) Clayton Soares | ÍF Fuglafjørður | 22 |
| 1 | (Faroe Islands) Páll Klettskarð | KÍ Klaksvík | 22 |
| 2 | (Faroe Islands) Arnbjørn Hansen | EB/Streymur | 16 |
| 3 | (Faroe Islands) Klæmint Olsen | NSÍ Runavík | 14 |
| 4 | (Faroe Islands) Christian Mouritsen | HB Tórshavn | 12 |
| 5 | (Faroe Islands) Kaj Leo í Bartalsstovu | Víkingur | 11 |
| 6 | (Faroe Islands) Andy Olsen | KÍ Klaksvík | 9 |
| 7 | (Faroe Islands) Fróði Benjaminsen | HB Tórshavn | 8 |
| 7 | (Faroe Islands) Hjartvard Hansen | Víkingur | 8 |
| 7 | (Faroe Islands) Leif Niclasen | EB/Streymur | 8 |
| 7 | (Poland) Łukasz Cieślewicz | B36 Tórshavn | 8 |
| 7 | (Faroe Islands) Símun Samuelsen | HB Tórshavn | 8 |

Source: Soccerway

== Awards ==
| Award | Winner | Team | Reference |
|---|---|---|---|
| Best Goalkeeper | (Faroe Islands) Jákup Mikkelsen | ÍF | |
| Best Defender | (Faroe Islands) Marni Djurhuus | EB/Streymur | |
| Best Midfielder | (Faroe Islands) Hallur Hansson | HB | |
| Best Forward | (Brazil) Clayton Soares | ÍF | |
| Best Young Player | (Faroe Islands) Páll Klettskarð | KÍ | |
| Best Coach | (Denmark) Flemming Christensen | ÍF | |
| Best Player | (Brazil) Clayton Soares | ÍF | |

Best Referee:
Lars Müller

Fair Play:
EB/Streymur

=== Team of the Season ===
- Goalkeeper: (Faroe Islands) Jákup Mikkelsen (ÍF)
- Defenders: (Faroe Islands) Bárður Hansen (Víkingur), (Faroe Islands) Bartal Eliasen (ÍF), (Faroe Islands) Marni Djurhuus (EB/Streymur), (Faroe Islands) Jan Ó. Ellingsgaard (ÍF)
- Midfielders: (Faroe Islands) Kaj Leo í Bartalsstovu (Víkingur), (Faroe Islands) Hallur Hansson (HB), (Faroe Islands) Høgni Madsen (ÍF), (Faroe Islands) Símun Samuelsen (HB)
- Forwards: (Faroe Islands) Arnbjørn Hansen (EB/Streymur), (Brazil) Clayton Soares (ÍF)

== See also ==
- 2012 Faroe Islands Cup
