= 2008 Faroe Islands Cup =

Tournament details
- Country: Faroe Islands
- Teams: 18

Final positions
- Champions: EB/Streymur
- Runners-up: B36 Tórshavn

Tournament statistics
- Matches played: 19
- Goals scored: 65 (3.42 per match)
- Top goal scorer(s): Andrew av Fløtum; Rasmus Nielsen; Károly Potemkin (4 goals each)

The 2008 Faroe Islands Cup was played between 15 March and 14 June 2008. It was won by EB/Streymur, who successively defended their title.

Only the first teams of Faroese football clubs were allowed to participate. The First Round involved only teams from second and third deild. Teams from the highest two divisions entered the competition in the Second Round.

== First round ==
The matches were played on 15 March 2008.

Team 1	Score	Team 2
Fram	3–0	Undri FF
NÍF	2–3 (a.e.t.)	MB Miðvágur

== Second round ==
The matches were played on 20 and 22 March 2008.

Team 1	Score	Team 2
EB/Streymur	1–0	NSÍ Runavík
VB/Sumba	1–2 (a.e.t.)	AB
TB Tvøroyri	6–1 (a.e.t.)	MB Miðvágur
07 Vestur	1–1 (a.e.t.); 4–2 (p)	Víkingur Gøta
B71 Sandur	2–1 (a.e.t.)	B68 Toftir
ÍF Fuglafjørður	2–3	HB Tórshavn
Fram	1–4	KÍ Klaksvík
B36 Tórshavn	1–0	Skála ÍF

== Quarter-finals ==
The matches were played on 2 April 2008.

Team 1	Score	Team 2
07 Vestur	2–2 (a.e.t.); 3–5 (p)	B36 Tórshavn
HB Tórshavn	5–1	TB Tvøroyri
EB/Streymur	2–0	KÍ Klaksvík
B71 Sandur	4–0	AB

== Semi-finals ==
The first legs were played on 20 April and the second legs on 12 May 2008.

Team 1	Agg.	Team 2	1st leg	2nd leg
B36 Tórshavn	2–1	HB Tórshavn	0–0	2–1
B71 Sandur	2–3	EB/Streymur	1–1	1–2

== Final ==
14 June 2008
18:15

B36 Tórshavn	2–3	EB/Streymur
Potemkin 38', 79'	Report (in Faroese)	Hansen 10', 76'; Samuelsen 19'

Gundadalur, Tórshavn
Attendance: 800
Referee: Petur Reinert

== Top goalscorers ==
Player	Team	Goals
(Faroe Islands) Rasmus Nielsen	B71 Sandoy	4
(Hungary) Károly Potemkin	B36 Tórshavn	4
(Faroe Islands) Andrew av Fløtum	HB Tórshavn	4
