= 2007 Faroe Islands Premier League =

Faroe Islands Premier League
- Season: 2007
- Champions: NSÍ
- Relegated: AB; VB/Sumba
- Champions League: NSÍ
- UEFA Cup: EB/Streymur; B36 Tórshavn
- Intertoto Cup: HB
- Matches played: 135
- Goals scored: 429 (3.18 per match)
- Top goalscorer: Amed Davy Sylla (18)
- Biggest home win: KÍ 5–0 VB/Sumba; EB/Streymur 6–1 VB/Sumba; GÍ 5–0 Skála
- Biggest away win: VB/Sumba 0–4 B36; GÍ 0–4 NSÍ Runavík; KÍ Klaksvík 0–4 GÍ
- Highest scoring: KÍ Klaksvík 6–3 VB/Sumba

The 2007 Faroe Islands Premier League was the 65th annual competition since its establishment. In this championship, AB Argir and B71 Sandur were promoted from 1. deild. At the end of the 2006 season, ÍF Fuglafjørður and B68 Toftir were relegated.

== Clubs ==
Team	City	Stadium	Capacity	Manager
AB Argir	Argir	Inni í Vika	2,000	
B36 Tórshavn	Tórshavn	Gundadalur	5,000	
B71 Sandur	Sandur	Inni í Dal	2,000	
EB/Streymur	Streymnes	Við Margáir	1,000	
GÍ Gøta	Norðragøta	Sarpugerði	2,000	
HB Tórshavn	Tórshavn	Gundadalur	5,000	
KÍ Klaksvík	Klaksvík	Injector Arena	3,000	
NSÍ Runavík	Runavík	Við Løkin	2,000	
Skála ÍF	Skáli	Undir Mýruhjalla	2,000	
VB/Sumba	Vágur	á Eiðinum	3,000	

== League table ==
Pos	Team	Pld	W	D	L	GF	GA	GD	Pts	Qualification or relegation
1	NSÍ Runavík (C)	27	19	4	4	52	24	+28	61	Qualification for the Champions League first qualifying round
2	EB/Streymur	27	17	3	7	58	33	+25	54	Qualification for the UEFA Cup first qualifying round (Note: Since EB/Streymur, winners of 2007 Faroe Islands Cup, were already placed in the second place in the league, third-placed B36 Tórshavn also earned a spot in the first qualifying round of the UEFA Cup and 4th placed HB Tórshavn qualified for the first round of the UEFA Intertoto Cup.)
3	B36 Tórshavn	27	15	7	5	47	23	+24	52	Qualification for the UEFA Cup first qualifying round
4	HB	27	15	4	8	59	34	+25	49	Qualification for the Intertoto Cup first round
5	GÍ Gøta	27	11	5	11	46	53	−7	38	
6	Skála IF	27	10	4	13	27	40	−13	34	
7	KÍ	27	9	6	12	44	47	−3	33	
8	B71 Sandoy	27	9	5	13	39	49	−10	32	
9	AB (R)	27	4	5	18	30	55	−25	17	Relegation to 1. deild
10	VB/Sumba (R)	27	2	5	20	27	71	−44	11	Relegation to 1. deild

Rules for classification: 1) Points; 2) Goal difference; 3) Goals scored
(C) Champions; (R) Relegated

== Results ==
The schedule consisted of a total of 27 games. Each team played three games against every opponent in no particular order. At least one of the games was at home and one was away. The additional home game for every match-up was randomly assigned prior to the season.

=== Regular home games ===
Home \ Away	AB	B36	B71	EBS	GÍG	HB	KÍ	NSÍ	SKÁ	VBS
Argja Bóltfelag		2–1	1–2	1–2	4–4	2–2	1–3	0–2	1–2	2–2
B36 Tórshavn	4–1		3–0	1–0	4–0	1–1	1–0	1–1	1–1	2–0
B71 Sandoy	1–0	0–3		2–3	1–1	2–1	3–3	0–1	0–2	0–0
EB/Streymur	3–0	0–1	2–4		1–1	1–2	2–1	1–0	3–0	4–2
GÍ Gøta	1–1	0–3	3–2	0–2		3–2	0–1	1–2	0–3	2–2
Havnar Bóltfelag	4–0	0–2	0–3	3–0	2–3		3–1	2–0	5–2	3–1
KÍ Klaksvík	1–0	1–1	3–3	1–2	2–3	0–2		2–0	1–0	5–0
NSÍ Runavík	2–1	3–0	3–0	1–1	3–1	1–0	3–1		3–1	5–2
Skála IF	0–2	0–2	2–0	2–1	0–1	2–5	1–0	0–1		1–1
VB/Sumba	1–0	0–4	1–4	1–2	0–1	0–0	1–0	1–2	0–1	

Source: ki.fo
Legend: Blue = home team win; Yellow = draw; Red = away team win.

=== Additional home games ===
Home \ Away	AB	B36	B71	EBS	GÍG	HB	KÍ	NSÍ	SKÁ	VBS
Argja Bóltfelag			0–1		1–3	1–2	3–1			
B36 Tórshavn	4–1					0–2	2–2		1–1	2–0
B71 Sandoy		1–0		1–4	2–3			1–3		
EB/Streymur	2–2	4–2						0–1	2–0	6–1
GÍ Gøta		0–1		1–4				0–4	5–0	
Havnar Bóltfelag			3–1	0–1	4–1		1–1			6–2
KÍ Klaksvík			3–1	2–5	0–4			2–2		6–3
NSÍ Runavík	2–1	1–1				2–1			1–2	3–1
Skála IF	2–0		0–0			1–3	0–1			
VB/Sumba	1–2		2–3		2–4				0–1	

Source: ki.fo
Legend: Blue = home team win; Yellow = draw; Red = away team win.

== Top goalscorers ==
18 goals

- (France) Amed Davy Sylla (B36)

14 goals

- (England) Paul Clapson (KI)
- (Faroe Islands) Arnbjørn Hansen (EB/Streymur)

13 goals

- (Denmark) Christian Lundberg (KI)

12 goals

- (Brazil) Clayton Soares (B71)

11 goals

- (Romania) Sorin Anghel (EB/Streymur)
- (Faroe Islands) Rógvi Jacobsen (HB)

10 goals

- (Brazil) Cardena Castilho Anderson (B36 / NSI)

9 goals

- (Faroe Islands) Fróði Benjaminsen (B36)
- (Faroe Islands) Andrew av Fløtum (HB)

8 goals

- (Faroe Islands) Christian Høgni Jacobsen (NSI/HB)
- (Faroe Islands) Hans Pauli Samuelsen (EB/Streymur)
