= Høgni Madsen =

Faroese footballer

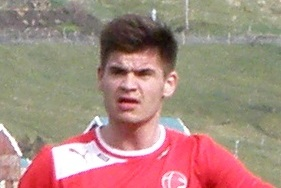

Personal information
- Full name: Høgni Madsen
- Date of birth: February 4, 1985 (age 41)
- Position: Midfielder

Team information
- Current team: B68
- Number: 2

Senior career*
Years	Team	Apps	(Gls)
2002	ÍF Fuglafjørður	4	(0)
2002–2004	GÍ Gøta	19	(0)
2004	ÍF Fuglafjørður	8	(0)
2005–2007	KÍ Klaksvík	69	(1)
2008	ÍF Fuglafjørður	24	(2)
2009	NSÍ Runavík	13	(0)
2009–2011	KÍ Klaksvík	47	(6)
2012–2013	ÍF Fuglafjørður	48	(5)
2014	EB/Streymur	18	(0)
2015	FC Suðuroy	22	(3)
2016	B36 Tórshavn	10	(0)
2016–2017	NSÍ Runavík	3	(0)
2017	Fram Reykjavík	16	(1)
2018	Þróttur Vogum	20	(0)
2019	ÍF	23	(1)
2020–	B68	15	(0)

International career
2003	Faroe Islands U19	3	(0)
2008	Faroe Islands	3	(0)
- * Club domestic league appearances and goals as of 13:52, 1 August 2021 (UTC)

Høgni Madsen (born 1985) is a Faroese former footballer and football referee. He played as a midfielder.

He has earlier played for other Faroese clubs like EB/Streymur, ÍF Fuglafjørður and KÍ Klaksvík, and for the Icelandic clubs Fram Reykjavík and Þróttur Vogum. He has played three matches for the Faroe Islands national football team.

== Individual honours ==
- Effodeildin Team of the Season: 2012
