= Eiðis Bóltfelag =

Sports club in Faroe Islands

EB Eiði
- Full name: Eiðis Bóltfelag
- Founded: 24 February 1913
Home colours

Eiðis Bóltfelag (also known as EB) is a Faroese sports club based in Eiði. Its football section merged with Streymur Hvalvik in 1993 to form EB/Streymur.

== History ==
=== Football ===
The club was founded on 24 February 1913, making it the oldest football club on Eysturoy The idea of a local football club was well received. Within the first few days, membership had risen to 40+ people.

In the first 30 years of existence, Eiðis Bóltfelag was only active in football. In the early years, from 1913 to 1916 time was spent on building the pitch. In 1916 EB played its first game. A 9-a-side game organized together with men from Fuglafjørður.

On the February 16 of that year, the club held its first general meeting. Oliver Øster was elected as the club's first chairman. Hans Jacob Joensen was given the role of treasurer. Other board members included, Dr. Effersøe, Johan Henrik Hansen, Olaf Ellingsgaard and Anton Ellingsgaard. In the early years, games were arranged together with players from Leirvík, Fuglafjørður and Gøta. In 1939 the Faroese sports association ÍSF was founded, and in 1942, a football league system was introduced. Eiðis Bóltfelag was quick to join. The club was given a license to play in the second tier. The club never managed to play in the best division. Yo-yoing between the second and third tier for many years.

In 1993 EB merged with neighbouring football club Streymur and became EB/Streymur. EB/Streymur has since become a household name in the top division Betrideildin.

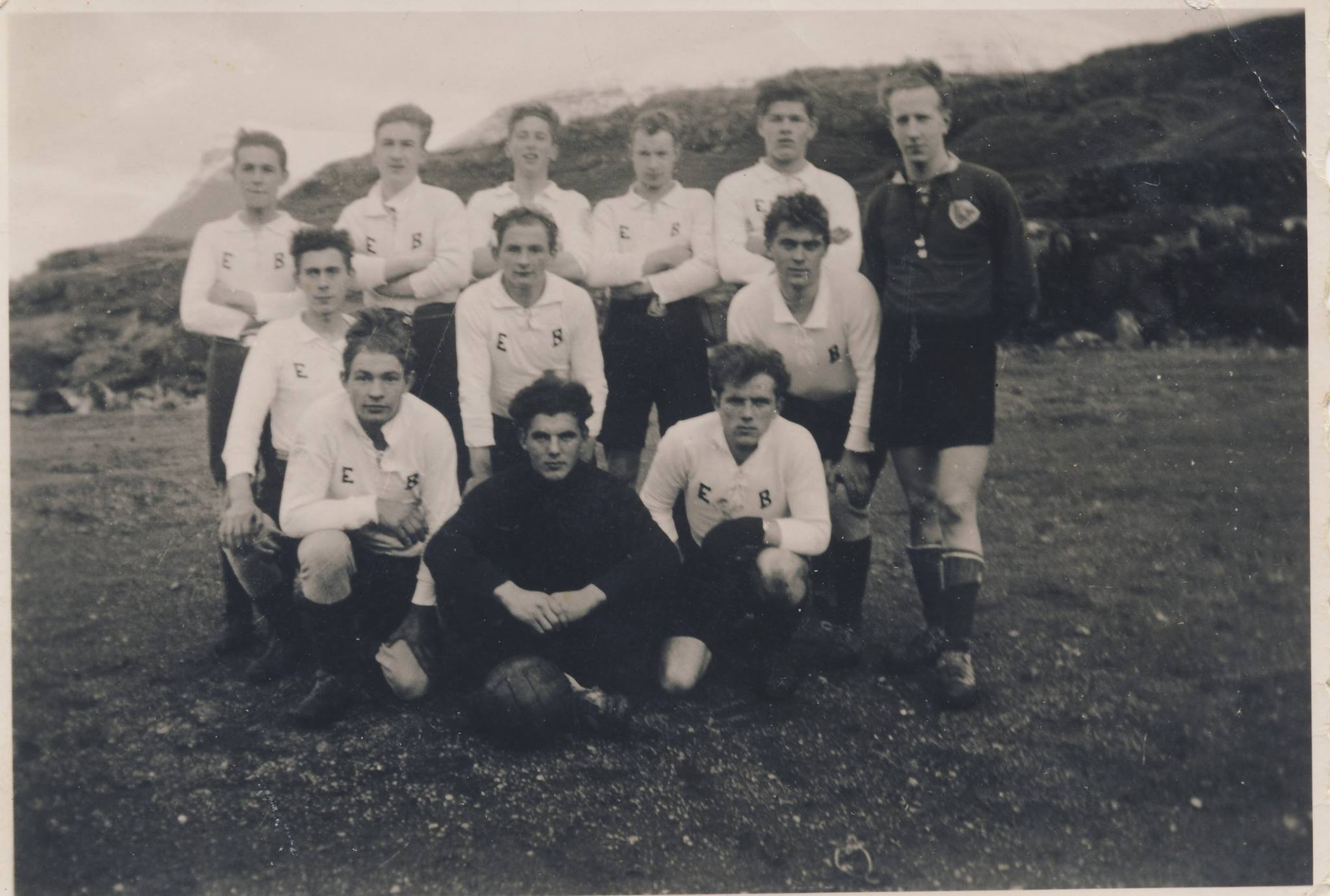
Eiðis Bóltfelag 1930's

=== Handball ===
As the second world war intensified and many local men went to sea, football slowly lost popularity in favour of handball. In 1945 the local teacher Andreas Thomsen began teaching local youths to play handball.

In 1947 EB participated in the women's handball league for the first time, and they won gold in both first and second division. This is still the only national championship won by an adult team from EB.

Handball was popular in Eiði during the 1950s and 1960s but slowly died away in the 1970s and early 1980s. In 2003 the village got a new sportshall and EB handball was revived and is rapidly growing in popularity.

== Honours ==
Football

- 3. deild (male): Winners 1985
- Under 16 boys: Champions 1992 Cup winners 1974, 1977
- Under 14 girls: Champions 1993
- Under 10 girls: Champions 1998

Handball

- 1. deild (female): Champions 1947
- 2. deild (female): Winners 1947, 1948, 1949, 1973, 1974
- 2. deild (male): Winners 1969, 1976

== See also ==
- List of football clubs in the Faroe Islands
