= Hans Pauli Samuelsen =

Faroese footballer

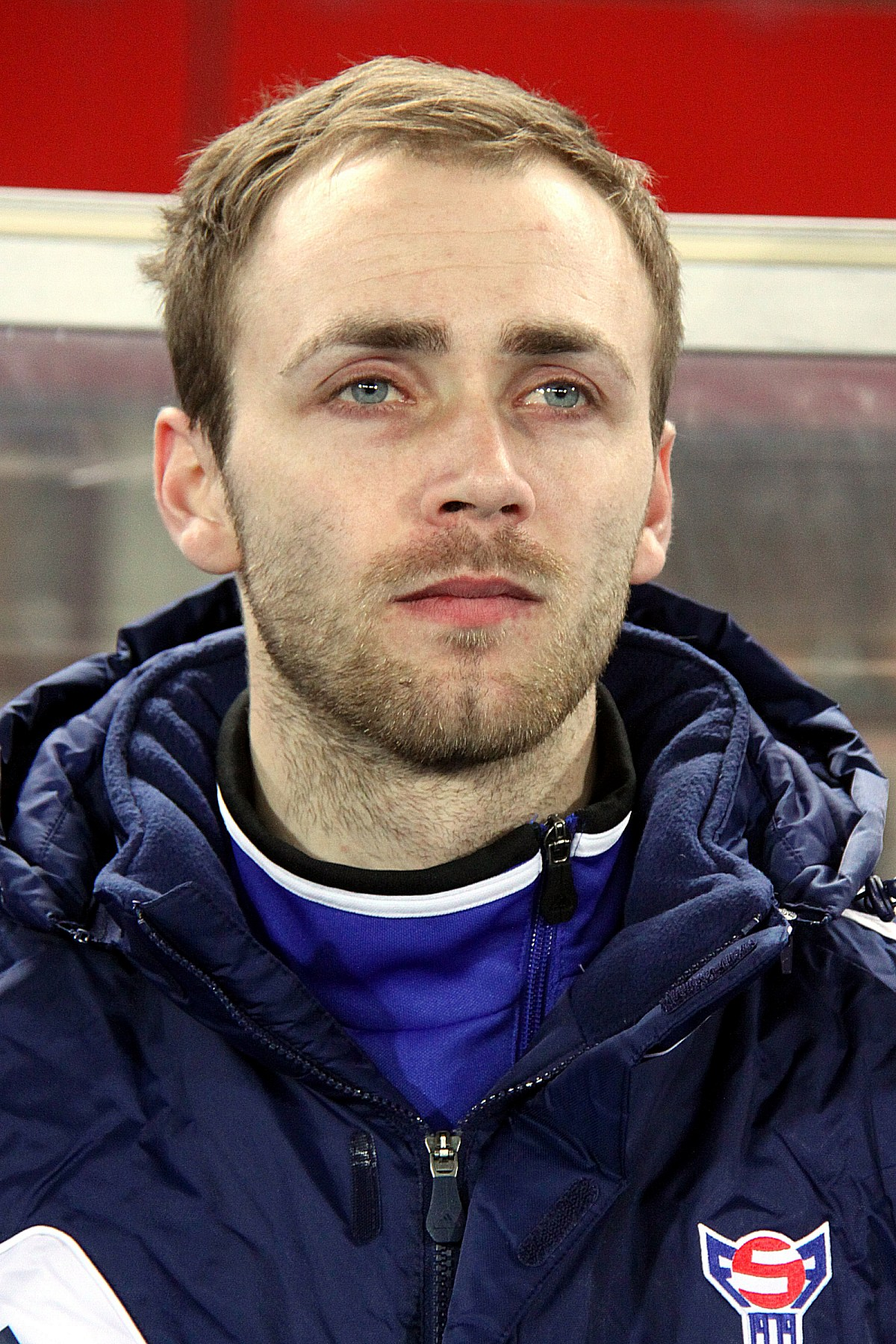

Personal information
- Full name: Hans Pauli Samuelsen
- Date of birth: 18 October 1984 (age 42)
- Place of birth: Eiði, Faroe Islands
- Height: 1.73 m (5 ft 8 in)
- Position: Left winger

Senior career*
Years	Team	Apps	(Gls)
2002–2014	EB/Streymur	309	(93)
2015	B36 Tórshavn	34	(10)
2016–2017	Víkingur	52	(10)
2018–2019	EB/Streymur	27	(1)

International career
2000	Faroe Islands U-17	2	(1)
2002	Faroe Islands U-19	3	(0)
2006–2013	Faroe Islands	4	(0)
- * Club domestic league appearances and goals

Hans Pauli Samuelsen (born 18 October 1984) is a Faroese retired professional footballer who played as a left winger.

== Club career ==
Samuelsen started his professional career in EB/Streymur where he stayed for 13 years, playing 309 competitive matches and scoring 93 goals. In 2015, he moved to B36 Tórshavn where he scored his first Champions League goal in the 2015–16 UEFA Champions League First qualifying round. The match ended in a 2–1 loss against Welsh The New Saints in the first leg at home.

== International career ==
Samuelsen has played for both Faroe Islands national U-17 team and Faroe Islands national U-19 team in his youth. He has also played for Faroe Islands national team in the UEFA Euro 2008 qualifying and the 2014 FIFA World Cup qualification, as well as some friendlies, making a total of four appearances in the senior team.

== Career statistics ==
=== Club ===
As of match played 1 July 2015

Club	Season	League			Cup (Note: Including Faroe Islands Cup)		Europe (Note: Including UEFA Champions League, UEFA Europa League and UEFA Cup)		Other (Note: Including Faroe Islands Super Cup)		Total	
Club	Season	Division	Apps	Goals	Apps	Goals	Apps	Goals	Apps	Goals	Apps	Goals
EB/Streymur	2002 (Note: In 2002 Hans Pauli Samuelsen played three relegation playoff matches (scoring one goal) which is not included in this table.)	1. deild (Note: 1. deild was the top division in Faroe Island before being replaced by Faroe Islands Premier League in 2005.)	18	1	7	1	—		—		25	2
EB/Streymur	2003	1. deild	18	5	7	3	—		—		25	8
EB/Streymur	2004	1. deild	17	1	7	1	—		—		24	2
EB/Streymur	2005	Faroe Islands Premier League	22	8	1	0	—		—		23	8
EB/Streymur	2006	Faroe Islands Premier League	27	10	4	4	—		—		31	14
EB/Streymur	2007	Faroe Islands Premier League	25	8	5	2	2	0	—		32	10
EB/Streymur	2008	Faroe Islands Premier League	27	12	5	3	2	0	1	0	35	15
EB/Streymur	2009	Faroe Islands Premier League	27	6	5	2	2	0	1	0	35	8
EB/Streymur	2010 (Note: In 2010 Hans Pauli Samuelsen made one appearance in the reserves team in the second tier, not included in this table.)	Faroe Islands Premier League	23	8	4	1	1	0	—		28	9
EB/Streymur	2011	Faroe Islands Premier League	27	8	5	1	2	0	1	0	35	9
EB/Streymur	2012	Faroe Islands Premier League	25	6	5	2	2	1	1	1	33	10
EB/Streymur	2013	Faroe Islands Premier League	26	7	5	0	2	0	1	0	34	7
EB/Streymur	2014	Faroe Islands Premier League	27	13	4	1	—		—		31	14
EB/Streymur	Total		309	93	64	21	13	1	5	1	391	116
B36 Tórshavn	2015	Faroe Islands Premier League	34	10	4	0	1	1	1	0	40	11
Career total			343	103	68	21	14	2	6	1	431	127

=== International ===
As of 2 July 2015

Team	Year	Apps	Goals
Faroe Islands national U–17 team	2000	2	1
Faroe Islands national U–19 team	2002	3	0
Faroe Islands national team	2006	2	0
Faroe Islands national team	2007	1	0
Faroe Islands national team	2013	1	0
Total		9	1

== Honours ==
As of March 8th 2018

EB/Streymur

- Faroe Islands Premier League: 2008, 2012
- Faroe Islands Cup: 2010, 2011
- Faroe Islands Super Cup: 2011, 2012, 2013

B36 Tórshavn

- Faroe Islands Premier League: 2015

Víkingur

- Faroe Islands Premier League: 2016, 2017
