= Jónhard Frederiksberg =

Faroese footballer (born 1980)

Personal information
- Full name: Jónhard Frederiksberg
- Date of birth: 27 August 1980 (age 46)
- Place of birth: Skála, Faroe Islands
- Position: Striker

Team information
- Current team: Skála ÍF
- Number: 7

Senior career*
Years	Team	Apps	(Gls)
1996–2006	Skála ÍF	135	(52)
2007–2008	NSÍ Runavík	43	(11)
2008	Skála ÍF	13	(1)
2009–2012	NSÍ Runavík	87	(0)
2012	EB/Streymur	17	(1)
2013-2015	NSÍ Runavík	88	(7)
2016-	Skála ÍF	129	(6)

International career^{‡}
2003–	Faroe Islands	13	(0)
- * Club domestic league appearances and goals as of 16 June 2012 ‡ National team caps and goals as of 16 June 2012

Jónhard Frederiksberg (born 27 August 1980) is a Faroese international footballer who plays club football for Skála ÍF as a striker.
