= Egil á Bø =

Faroese footballer

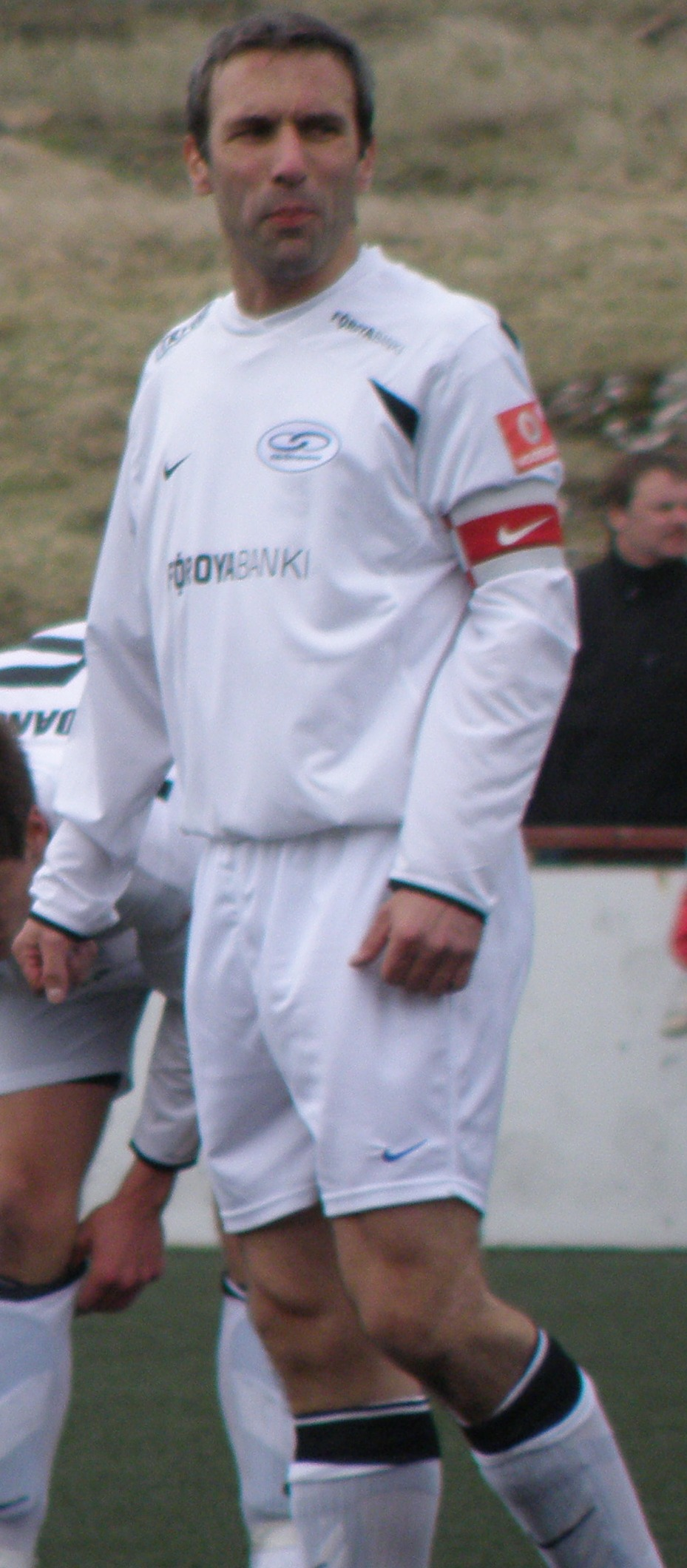
- Egil á Bø while playing for EB/Streymur in 2010

Personal information
- Full name: Egil á Bø Zachariasen
- Date of birth: 2 April 1974 (age 52)
- Place of birth: Tórshavn, Faroe Islands
- Height: 1.86 m (6 ft 1 in)
- Position: Centre back

Team information
- Current team: EB/Streymur
- Number: 8

Senior career*
Years	Team	Apps	(Gls)
1991–1995	EB/Streymur	46	(12)
1995–1996	NSÍ Runavík	17	(3)
1996–1999	ÍF Fuglafjørður	52	(16)
1999–2003	B36 Tórshavn	67	(13)
2003–2004	EB/Streymur	16	(4)
2004–2005	B36 Tórshavn	16	(7)
2005–	EB/Streymur	228	(25)

International career^{‡}
2008–2010	Faroe Islands	14	(1)
- * Club domestic league appearances and goals as of 19 November 2015 ‡ National team caps and goals as of 5 July 2013

Egil á Bø (born 2 April 1974, né Egil Zachariasen) is a Faroese football defender who plays for EB/Streymur and the Faroe Islands national football team. Bø scored his first goal for the national team in a 3-1 defeat in Piatra Neamţ to Romania. Egil á Bø was previously known as Egil Zachariassen, he changed his family name a few years ago.

== Club career ==
Egil á Bø has played for several Faroese football clubs:

- 2005- EB/Streymur
- 2004 B36 Tórshavn
- 2003 EB/Streymur
- 1999-2002 B36 Tórshavn
- 1996-1998 ÍF Fuglafjørður
- 1995 NSÍ Runavík
- 1993-94 EB/Streymur
- 1991-92 Streymur

== International career ==
Egil is the oldest ever Faroese international debutant, having played the first game for his country in an away friendly with Portugal at the age of 34 years, 4 months and 18 days.

=== International goals ===
Scores and results list Faroe Islands' goal tally first.

#	Date	Venue	Opponent	Score	Result	Competition
1	14 November 2009	Stadionul Ceahlăul, Piatra Neamţ, Romania	Romania	1-3	1-3	2010 FIFA World Cup Qualifying
