= Clayton Nascimento =

Afro-Brazilian creative and educator

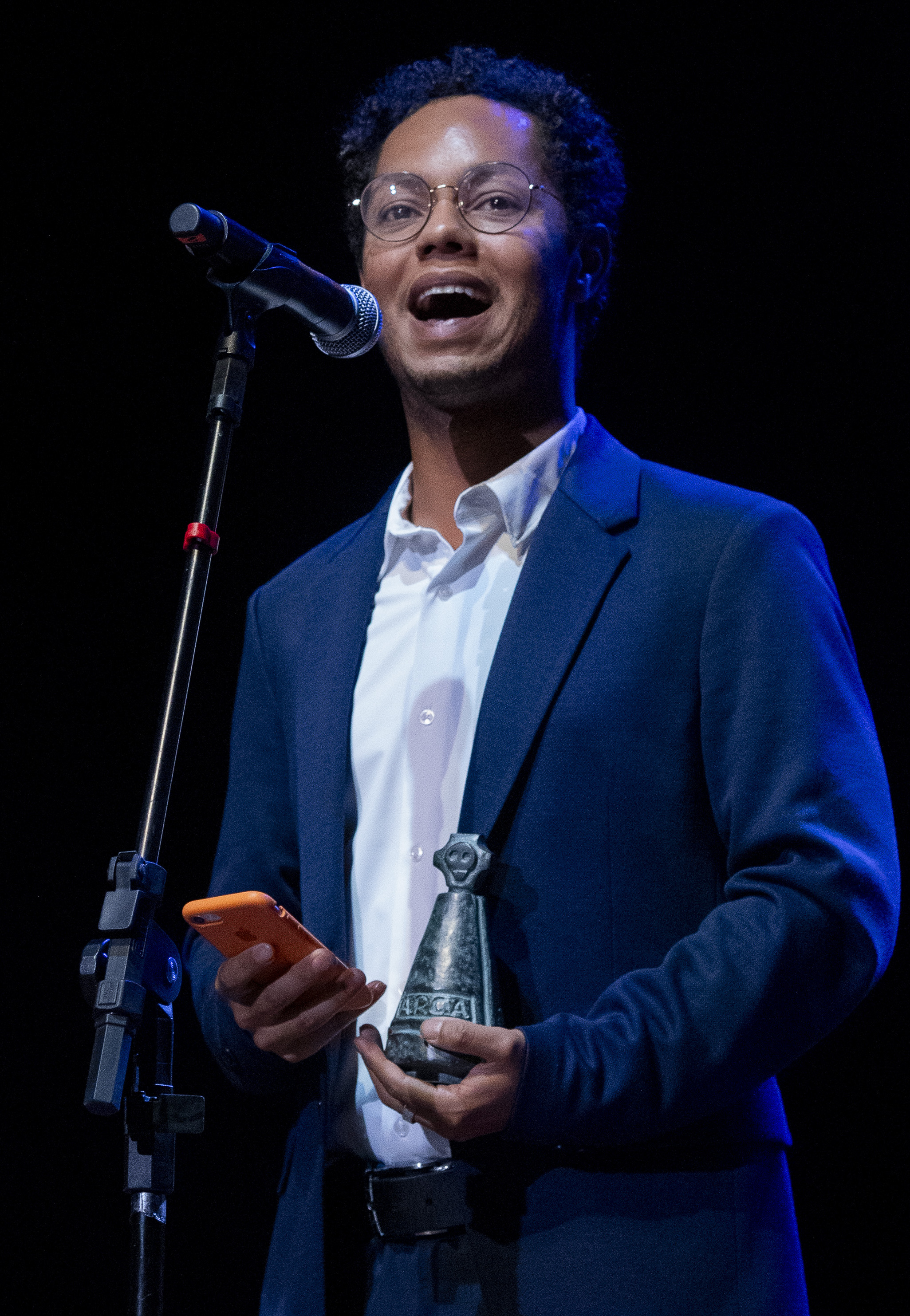
- Occupation: Educator

Clayton Nascimento is an Afro-Brazilian creative and educator who is a rising figure in modern Brazilian theater.

== Biography ==
Clayton Nascimento’s contributions to Brazil’s contemporary theater landscape include his work as an actor, playwright, director, and professor. Born and raised in São Paulo’s Jabaquara district, Nascimento started training at actress Lígia Cortez’s Casa do Teatro. The son of a working-class family, with his mother, Carmen do Nascimento, working as a manicurist, and his father, Crispin do Nascimento, a manual laborer, Nascimento would secure a 15-year scholarship to further his studies at the theater school. He is also currently pursuing a Master’s degree from the School of Communications and Arts at the University of São Paulo (USP).

In 2016, Nascimento worked with the English Royal Shakespeare Company, performing in the play MACBETH. In addition to his theater work, Nascimento has appeared in various Brazilian TV series. These include Carcereiros, Selvagem, Dois Tempos, A Caverna de Petra, As Five, and Fuzuê. He also works as a casting director. Nascimento won the Shell Theater Award for Best Actor in 2023, making him the fourth youngest Black actor in Brazil to receive the honor. His play, MACACOS, was praised as a “historical and dramatic document”. Grounded in his academic research into Afro-Brazilian history, his plays have had an impact on both the justice system and education, with MACACOS inspiring legal action and public schools in São Paulo adopting his scripts to teach about Brazil’s colonial history.

In November 2024, Nascimento co-wrote and presented the TV special "Falas negras" for TV Globo.

== Awards ==
Nascimento has also garnered attention for his roles in other productions and his work as a director, earning nominations and awards at theater festivals across Brazil. He is the youngest Brazilian to win the Shell Theater Award, and has also been awarded the Best Actor award from the Association of Theater Producers.
