= Marni Djurhuus =

Faroese footballer (born 1985)

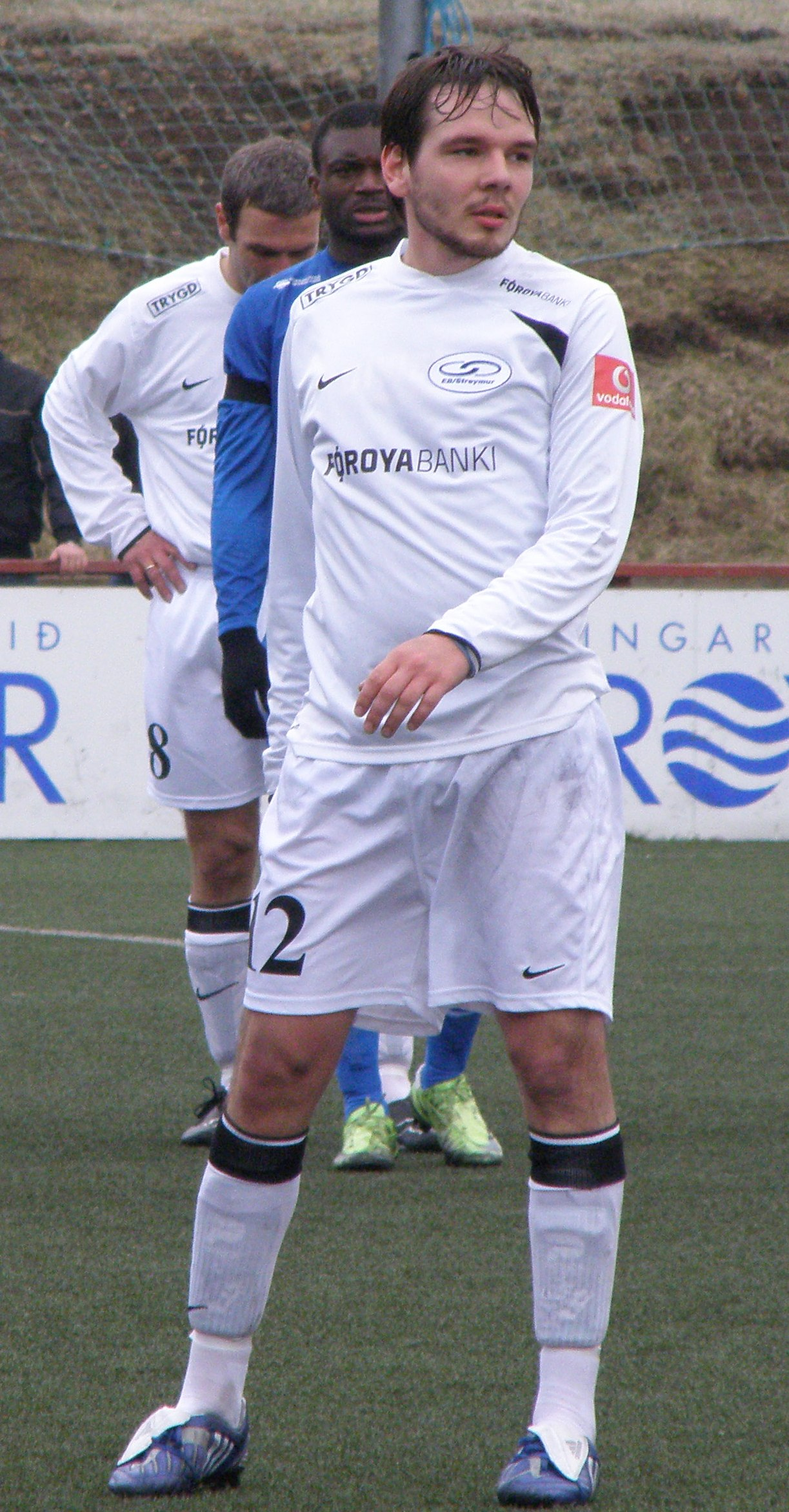

Personal information
- Date of birth: 6 September 1985 (age 41)
- Place of birth: Faroe Islands
- Height: 1.80 m (5 ft 11 in)
- Position: Centre back

Youth career
- EB/Streymur

Senior career*
Years	Team	Apps	(Gls)
2001–2010	EB/Streymur	229	(11)
2010	Vanløse IF		
2010–2017	EB/Streymur	185	(18)
2018–2019	EB/Streymur	29	(6)

International career^{‡}
2006–2007	Faroe Islands	6	(0)
- * Club domestic league appearances and goals as of 16 June 2012 ‡ National team caps and goals as of 16 June 2012

Marni Djurhuus (born 6 September 1985) is a Faroese retired football defender.

== Club career ==
He mostly played for EB/Streymur, and made his debut match in the top league for EB/Streymur on 9 September 2001, making him the youngest player ever to play in the top division.

In 2009, Djurhuus and EB/Streymur played in the UEFA Champions League Second qualifying round. They played against APOEL. The first match was played on 14 July 2009, the result was 0–2. The second match was played one week later, EB/Streymur lost 3–0.

== International career ==
Djurhuus made his debut for the Faroe Islands national team on 7 October 2006 against Lithuania. The player announced his retirement from the national team before the match between Faroe Islands and France, on 13 October 2007, due to undisclosed personal issues. It is not known if this is a permanent retirement.

Djurhuus has also played for the Faroe Islands under-17 team. They played against Belarus on 26 September 2000. Belarus won 1–0.

== Individual honours ==
- Effodeildin Best Defender: 2012
- Effodeildin Team of the Season: 2012
- Faroe Islands Premier League: 2011
- Faroe Islands Cup: 2006, 2007, 2009, 2010
