= Károly Potemkin =

Hungarian football player

Personal information
- Full name: Károly Potemkin
- Date of birth: 19 June 1977 (age 49)
- Place of birth: Budapest, Hungary
- Height: 1.83 m (6 ft 0 in)
- Position: Forward

Team information
- Current team: SVg Purgstall

Senior career*
| Years | Team | Apps | (Gls) |
| 1994–2000 | BVSC Budapest | 61 | (17) |
| 1998 | → Ferencvárosi TC (loan) | 5 | (0) |
| 2000–2002 | FC Tatabánya | 20 | (2) |
| 2002 | FC Fót | ? | (?) |
| 2002–2003 | Rákospalotai EAC | 19 | (15) |
| 2003 | Szombathelyi Haladás | 6 | (1) |
| 2003–2004 | BFC Siófok | 8 | (0) |
| 2004–2005 | Békéscsaba 1912 Előre SE | 10 | (1) |
| 2005–2006 | Kecskeméti TE | 6 | (4) |
| 2006 | Vecsési FC | 13 | (4) |
| 2006–2007 | Dunaújváros FC | 14 | (5) |
| 2007 | Jászberényi SE | 12 | (7) |
| 2007–2008 | EB/Streymur | 12 | (3) |
| 2008 | B36 Tórshavn | 15 | (9) |
| 2008–2010 | NSÍ Runavík | 49 | (20) |
| 2010–2011 | Újbudai TC | 16 | (10) |
| 2011 | Csepel SC | ? | (?) |
| 2011– | SVg Purgstall | ? | (?) |

International career
| 1996–1997 | Hungary U-21 | 1 | (0) |
- * Club domestic league appearances and goals as of 11 July 2012

Károly Potemkin (born 19 June 1977 in Budapest) is a retired Hungarian football player.

== Resources ==
- Futballévkönyv 1999, I. kötet, 78–82. o., Aréna 2000 kiadó, Budapest, 2000 ISBN 963-85967-8-3 (in Hungarian)
- Profile on siofok.com (in Hungarian)
- Profile on ftcbk.eu (in Hungarian)
- Stats on futball-adattar.hu (in Hungarian)
- Károly Potemkin at Soccerway (archived)
- Károly Potemkin at WorldFootball.net
