= Sorin Anghel =

Romanian footballer (born 1979)

Sorin Vasile Anghel (born 16 July 1979) is a Romanian football manager and former footballer.

== Biography ==
Anghel moved from Romania to the Faroe Islands at the age of twenty-one.

Anghel played for Faroese side EB/Streymur, helping the club win the league. He was described as a "well-known player in the Faroe Islands, where he also received the award for the best foreign player in this country".

Anghel received an offer to play for the Faroe Islands national football team.

Anghel operated as a central defender and striker while playing for EB/Streymur.

Anghel managed Faroese side Skála ÍF, where he was described as "able to lift the players... although it turned out to be impossible to turn the tide against relegation".

Anghel has been married.
