= EB/Streymur =

Association football club in the Faroe Islands

- Full name: EB/Streymur
- Founded: 1993; 33 years ago
- Ground: Við Margáir; Streymnes, Faroe Islands, Í Hólmanum Eiði, Faroe Islands.
- Capacity: 2,000/1,500
- Chairman: Theodor í Búrstovu
- Manager: Sigfríður Clementsen
- League: Faroe Islands Premier League
- 2025: Faroe Islands Premier League, 7th of 10
- Website: http://ebstreymur.fo/
Home colours	Away colours

EB/Streymur is a Faroese semi-professional football club based in Streymnes and Eiði. The club was founded in 1993, as result of the merger between EB and Streymur. They have won the Faroe Islands Premier League twice and the Faroe Islands Cup four times.

== History ==
Former logo.

The club is a result of a merger in 1993 between Eiðis Bóltfelag, who were founded on 24 February 1913, and Streymur, founded in 1976. Prior to the merger, both EB Eiði and Streymur usually played their football in the second or third division. After the merger in 1993, the team still resided in the lower divisions, but this soon changed. With a newly built football ground at Mølin, Eiði, and a healthy injection of young talent, EB/Streymur chased promotion to the top flight. Among these players in were: Hans Pauli Samuelsen, Bárður Olsen (Haldórsvík), Brian Olsen (Tjørnuvík), Marni Djurhuus, Gert Hansen, Arnbjørn Hansen (Kollafjørður). With the help of veteran attacker Jón Sigurd Gleðisheygg, the team won promotion in the 1999/00 season, finishing in place second, behind B36.

EB/Streymur have since gained a foothold in the top division (Betri deildin), as title contenders. In 2006, following a mid-table finish the previous season, the club made a strong start to the season under Polish coach Piotr Krakowski, and led the league at the mid-summer break, having recorded a club record 8–2 win against B68 Toftir. With four matches left to play their lead at the top of the table was seven points. A dip in form followed, but the club went into the final match requiring a draw against KÍ to win the title. However, a late KÍ goal, coupled with HB taking the lead in their match with two minutes remaining meant EB/Streymur were denied the title. In 2007, the club again finished second, and played in European competition for the first time, losing 2–1 on aggregate to Finnish club MyPa in the UEFA Cup first qualifying round.

Prior to the 2008 season, EB/Streymur had never won the Faroese championship neither before nor after the merger, however on 15 August 2007 and again on 14 June 2008, EB/Streymur won a trophy for the first time by winning the Faroe Islands Cup and its second by winning the Cup again as holders the year after. On 21 October 2008, after finishing as runners-up in the league two consecutive seasons previously, the club finally won its first championship, and thus the double in the 2008 season.

In July 2008, the club was drawn against Manchester City of England's Premier League in the first qualifying round of the UEFA Cup 2008-09. Director Rólant Højsted announced that the home leg of the tie would be held at one of the larger grounds in the Faroe Islands, either Toftir or Tórshavn, as the club's við Margáir ground has a capacity of only 1,000. The tie, which was played in Tórshavn, ended with a defeat of 0 – 2 to Manchester City with goals coming in the first half from Martin Petrov & Dietmar Hamann. The away leg was played at the Oakwell Stadium of Championship League side Barnsley Football Club rather than Manchester City's, City of Manchester Stadium due to the pitch being resurfaced. The pitch was re-surfaced as a Bon Jovi Concert was a couple of weeks before the match.

In 2012 EB/Streymur won their second league title.

On 25 September 2014, EB/Streymur lost one of the clubs best football players, the 22-year-old Gunnar Zachariasen, who died in a tragic accident on board a Greenlandic fishing trawler which was in Tórshavn in order to sell its fish. The accident happened while unloading fish from the trawler, something went wrong and a lot of boxes with frozen fish fell on top of Gunnar Zachariasen who died instantly. According to Rúni Nolsøe, EB/Streymurs coach, Faroese football had lost a very good football player. He played 11 caps and scored 4 goals for the U21 Faroe Islands team. EB/Streymur was supposed to play against NSÍ Runavík the a few days later, but the match was cancelled because of the death of Gunnar Zachariasen.

In recent years the club has often been predicted as relegation candidate, but usually finish in 6th to 8th position in the 10 team Premier League (Betri deildin), comfortably clear of relegation.

== Current squad ==
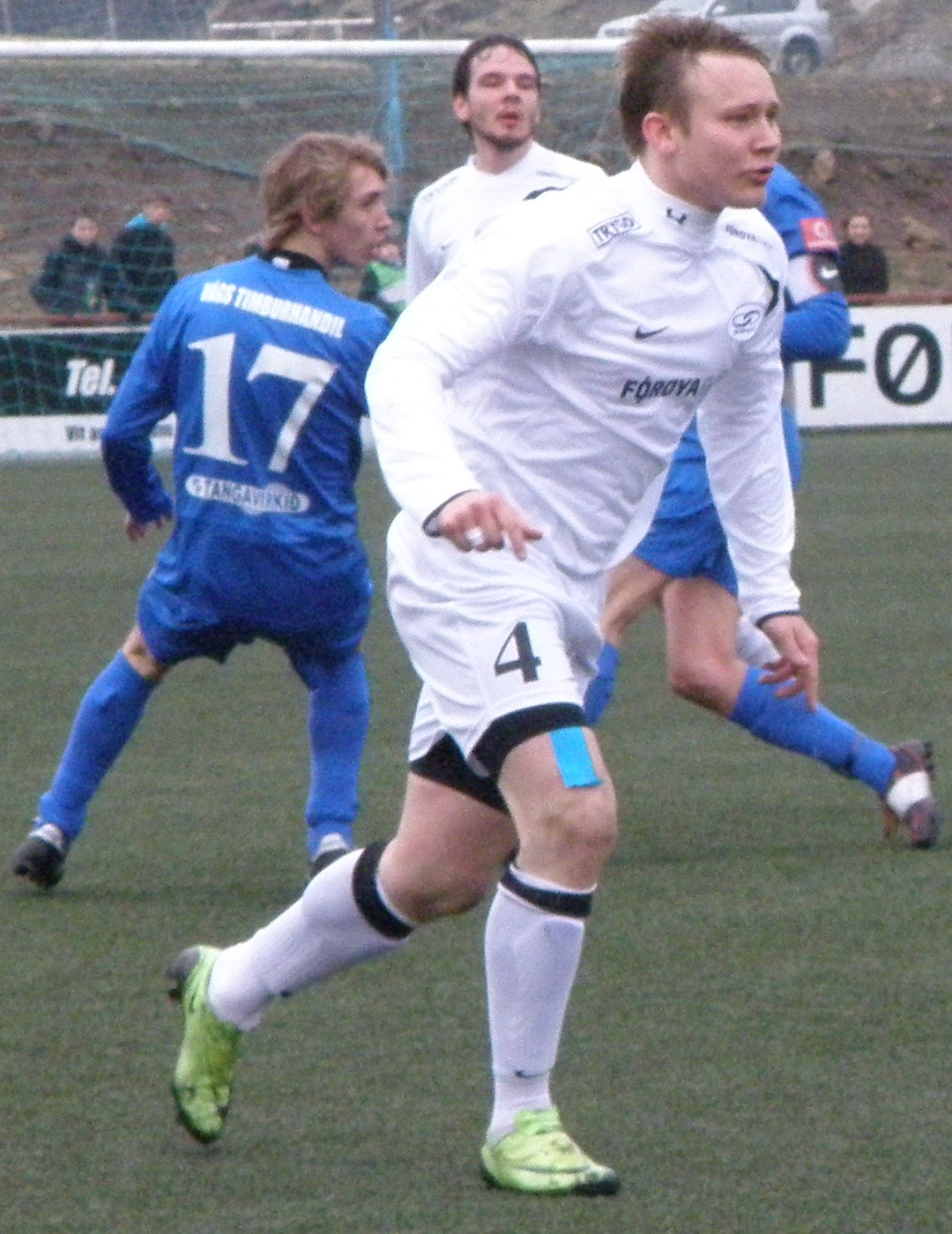
EB/Streymur and FC Suðuroy in the Faroese Cup match on 25 April 2010, which EB/Streymur won 4–1. Four months later EB/Streymur won the Cup (Løgmanssteypið). The EB/Streymur players in this photo are Gert Aage Hansen and Marni Djurhuus.

Updated 15 August 2026

Note: Flags indicate national team as defined under FIFA eligibility rules; some limited exceptions apply. Players may hold more than one non-FIFA nationality.

No.	Pos.	Nation	Player
1	GK	FRO	Jóanes E. Davidsen
2	DF	FRO	Meinhard D. Geyti
5	DF	FRO	Mikkjal S. Hellisá (captain)
6	MF	FRO	Ábraham Klein Joensen
7	MF	FRO	Búi Egilsson
9	MF	FRO	Tóki H. Johannesen
10	DF	FRO	Gestur Dam
11	FW	FRO	Kristian S. Eliasen
16	GK	FRO	Fayo Kruse
17	FW	FRO	Fríði Holm
18	MF	DEN	Marius Nielsen

No.	Pos.	Nation	Player
19	MF	FRO	Thomas B. Miezan
20	DF	FRO	Virgar Jónsson
21	MF	FRO	Hans Pauli á Bø
22	MF	FRO	Gutti Dahl-Olsen
23	MF	FRO	Sverri Mariusarson
24	MF	FRO	Jákup Hummeland
25	MF	FRO	Óli E. Poulsen
26	DF	FRO	Andras Olsen
27	FW	GAM	Ba Lamin Sowe
28	DF	DEN	Laurits Nørby

== Staff ==
Management

- Chairman: Theodor í Búrstovu

Sports

- Head Coach: Sigfríður Clementsen
- Assistant Coach: Jákup Mikkelsenn
- Reserve Coach: Sjúrður Jacobsen

== Managers ==
- (Faroe Islands) Hans Jákup Andreasen (1993)
- (Iceland) Páll Guðlaugsson (Jan 1994 – June 94)
- (Faroe Islands) Bergur Magnussen (June 1994 – Dec 94)
- (Faroe Islands) Harry Benjaminsen (1997)
- (Faroe Islands) Jón Sólsker
- (Faroe Islands) Bergur Magnussen (2001)
- (Faroe Islands) Trygvi Mortensen (2002)
- (Poland) Piotr Krakowski (2003–07)
- (Faroe Islands) Sámal Erik Hentze (2007)
- (Faroe Islands) Sigfríður Clementsen (1 Jan 2008 – 30 June 2009)
- (Faroe Islands) Heðin Askham (1 Aug 2009 – 31 Dec 2012)
- (Faroe Islands) Rúni Nolsøe (1 Jan 2013–2014)
- (Faroe Islands) Eliesar Olsen (2015)
- (Faroe Islands) Olgar Danielsen (2016)
- (Faroe Islands) Heðin Askham (2017–2018)
- (Faroe Islands) Jákup Martin Joensen (2019–2022)
- (Faroe Islands) Sigfríður Clementsen (2022-)

== Honours ==
- Faroe Islands Premier League: 2

2008, 2012

- Faroese Cup: 4

2007, 2008, 2010, 2011

- Faroe Islands Super Cup: 3

2011, 2012, 2013

- 1. deild: 2

2000, 2016

=== European cup history ===
Season	Competition	Round	Opponents	Home	Away	Aggregate
2007–08	UEFA Cup	First qualifying round	(Finland) MyPa-47	1–1	0–1	1–2
2008–09	UEFA Cup	First qualifying round	(England) Manchester City	0–2	0–2	0–4
2009–10	UEFA Champions League	Second qualifying round	(Cyprus) APOEL Nicosia	0–2	0–3	0–5
2010–11	UEFA Europa League	First qualifying round	(Sweden) Kalmar FF	0–3	0–1	0–4
2011–12	UEFA Europa League	Second qualifying round	(Azerbaijan) Qarabağ	1–1	0–0	1–1 (a)
2012–13	UEFA Europa League	First qualifying round	(Armenia) Gandzasar	3–1	0–2	3–3 (a)
2013–14	UEFA Champions League	First qualifying round	(Andorra) Lusitanos	5–1	2–2	7–3
2013–14	UEFA Champions League	Second qualifying round	(Georgia (country)) Dinamo Tbilisi	1–3	1–6	2–9

It is notable that in June 2008 the side did very well to contain English champions Manchester City to just a 2–0 win with their semi-professional side in front of a crowd of 5,000 against players such as Brazil & AC Milan winger Robinho and Galatasaray central midfielder Elano

=== European record ===
Competition	Matches	W	D	L	GF	GA
UEFA Champions League	6	1	1	4	9	17
UEFA Cup / UEFA Europa League	10	1	3	6	5	14
Total	16	2	4	10	14	31

== See also ==
- List of football clubs in the Faroe Islands
