= 2021–22 UEFA Europa Conference League qualifying (first and second round matches) =

European football competition

This page summarises the matches of the first and second qualifying rounds of 2021–22 UEFA Europa Conference League qualifying.

Times are CEST (UTC+2), as listed by UEFA (local times, if different, are in parentheses).

== First qualifying round ==
=== Summary ===
The first legs were played on 6 and 8 July, and the second legs were played on 13 and 15 July 2021.

The winners of the ties advanced to the Main Path second qualifying round. The losers were eliminated from European competitions for the season.

Team 1	Agg.	Team 2	1st leg	2nd leg
FCI Levadia (Estonia)	4–4	(Gibraltar) St Joseph's	3–1	1–3 6-5p
Inter Turku (Finland)	1–3	(Hungary) Puskás Akadémia	1–1	0–2
Drita (Kosovo)	3–1 (Note: Order of legs reversed after original draw.)	(Montenegro) Dečić	2–1	1–0
Sūduva (Lithuania)	2–1	(Latvia) Valmiera	2–1	0–0
Birkirkara (Malta)	2–1	(San Marino) La Fiorita	1–0	1–1
Mons Calpe (Gibraltar)	1–5	(Andorra) FC Santa Coloma	1–1	0–4
Velež Mostar (Bosnia and Herzegovina)	4–2	(Northern Ireland) Coleraine	2–1	2–1
Domžale (Slovenia)	2–1	(Luxembourg) Swift Hesperange	1–0	1–1
Shkupi (North Macedonia)	3–1	(Kosovo) Llapi	2–0	1–1
Tre Penne (San Marino)	0–7	(Georgia (country)) Dinamo Batumi	0–4	0–3
Partizani (Albania)	8–4	(Moldova) Sfîntul Gheorghe	5–2	3–2
Maribor (Slovenia)	2–0	(Armenia) Urartu	1–0	1–0
Podgorica (Montenegro)	1–3	(Albania) Laçi	1–0	0–3 (a.e.t.)
Milsami Orhei (Moldova)	1–0	(Bosnia and Herzegovina) Sarajevo	0–0	1–0
Noah (Armenia)	1–5	(Finland) KuPS	1–0	0–5
Žilina (Slovakia)	6–3	(Georgia (country)) Dila Gori	5–1	1–2
FH (Iceland)	3–1	(Republic of Ireland) Sligo Rovers	1–0	2–1
Paide Linnameeskond (Estonia)	1–4	(Poland) Śląsk Wrocław	1–2	0–2
RFS (Latvia)	6–5	(Faroe Islands) KÍ	2–3	4–2 (a.e.t.)
Bala Town (Wales)	0–2	(Northern Ireland) Larne	0–1	0–1
MOL Fehérvár (Hungary)	1–3	(Armenia) Ararat Yerevan	1–1	0–2
Sutjeska (Montenegro)	2–1	(Georgia (country)) Gagra	1–0	1–1
Sileks (North Macedonia)	1–2	(Moldova) Petrocub Hîncești	1–1	0–1
Široki Brijeg (Bosnia and Herzegovina)	3–4	(Albania) Vllaznia	3–1	0–3
Stjarnan (Iceland)	1–4	(Republic of Ireland) Bohemians	1–1	0–3
Glentoran (Northern Ireland)	1–3	(Wales) The New Saints	1–1	0–2
Sant Julià (Andorra)	1–1 (3–5 p)	(Malta) Gżira United	0–0	1–1 (a.e.t.)
Europa (Gibraltar)	0–2	(Lithuania) Kauno Žalgiris	0–0	0–2
Dundalk (Republic of Ireland)	5–0	(Wales) Newtown	4–0	1–0
Mosta (Malta)	3–4	(Slovakia) Spartak Trnava	3–2	0–2
Liepāja (Latvia)	5–2	(North Macedonia) Struga	1–1	4–1
Racing Union (Luxembourg)	2–5	(Iceland) Breiðablik	2–3	0–2
Honka (Finland)	3–1	(Faroe Islands) NSÍ	0–0	3–1

=== Matches ===
8 July 2021
19:30 (20:30 UTC+3)

FCI Levadia (Estonia)	3–1	(Gibraltar) St Joseph's
Beglarishvili 2'; Agyiri 9'; Putinčanin 72' (pen.)	Report	Pecci 74'

Lilleküla Stadium, Tallinn
Attendance: 1,076
Referee: Snir Levy (Israel)
15 July 2021
18:30

St Joseph's (Gibraltar)	1–1	(Estonia) FCI Levadia
Juanfri 19'	Report	Beglarishvili 65'

Victoria Stadium, Gibraltar
Attendance: 285
Referee: Hugo Miguel (Portugal)

FCI Levadia won 4–2 on aggregate.

8 July 2021
17:30 (18:30 UTC+3)

Inter Turku (Finland)	1–1	(Hungary) Puskás Akadémia
Källman 59'	Report	Plšek 76'

Veritas Stadion, Turku
Attendance: 1,556
Referee: Tore Hansen (Norway)
15 July 2021
20:00

Puskás Akadémia (Hungary)	2–0	(Finland) Inter Turku
Annan 4' (o.g.); van Nieff 87'	Report

Pancho Aréna, Felcsút
Attendance: 1,393
Referee: Athanasios Tzilos (Greece)

Puskás Akadémia won 3–1 on aggregate.

8 July 2021
20:00

Drita (Kosovo)	2–1	(Montenegro) Dečić
Ajzeraj 11'; Simonovski 78'	Report	Camaj 3'

Fadil Vokrri Stadium, Pristina (Note: Drita played their home matches at Fadil Vokrri Stadium, Pristina, instead of their regular stadium Gjilan City Stadium, Gjilan, which did not meet UEFA requirements.)
Attendance: 0 (Note: Due to the COVID-19 pandemic in Europe, the match was played behind closed doors.)
Referee: Vitor Ferreira (Portugal)
15 July 2021
20:45

Dečić (Montenegro)	0–1	(Kosovo) Drita
	Report	Cuculi 84'

Stadion pod Goricom, Podgorica (Note: Dečić played their home match at Stadion pod Goricom, Podgorica, instead of their regular stadium Stadion Tuško Polje, Tuzi, which did not meet UEFA requirements.)
Attendance: 1,045
Referee: Fedayi San (Switzerland)

Drita won 3–1 on aggregate.

8 July 2021
18:00 (19:00 UTC+3)

Sūduva (Lithuania)	2–1	(Latvia) Valmiera
Gorobsov 27' (pen.); Gargalatzidis 90+6' (pen.)	Report	Krollis 35' (pen.)

Sūduva Stadium, Marijampolė
Attendance: 900
Referee: Jasmin Šabotić (Luxembourg)
15 July 2021
18:00 (19:00 UTC+3)

Valmiera (Latvia)	0–0	(Lithuania) Sūduva
	Report

Daugava Stadium, Riga (Note: Valmiera played their home match at Daugava Stadium, Riga, instead of their regular stadium Jānis Daliņš Stadium, Valmiera, which did not meet UEFA requirements.)
Attendance: 451
Referee: Marian Alexandru Barbu (Romania)

Sūduva won 2–1 on aggregate.

8 July 2021
20:00

Birkirkara (Malta)	1–0	(San Marino) La Fiorita
Yankam 14'	Report

Centenary Stadium, Ta' Qali
Attendance: 221
Referee: Nikolas Neokleous (Cyprus)
15 July 2021
20:45

La Fiorita (San Marino)	1–1	(Malta) Birkirkara
Yankam 56' (o.g.)	Report	Montebello 53'

San Marino Stadium, Serravalle
Attendance: 192
Referee: Eldorjan Hamiti (Albania)

Birkirkara won 2–1 on aggregate.

6 July 2021
17:50

Mons Calpe (Gibraltar)	1–1	(Andorra) FC Santa Coloma
Hernández 81'	Report	Bellart 39'

Victoria Stadium, Gibraltar
Attendance: 275
Referee: Ondřej Berka (Czech Republic)
15 July 2021
18:30

FC Santa Coloma (Andorra)	4–0	(Gibraltar) Mons Calpe
Lopez 3'; Puerto 11'; Cisteró 16' (pen.); A. Ramos 90+2'	Report

Estadi Nacional, Andorra la Vella
Attendance: 0
Referee: Mileta Šćepanović (Montenegro)

FC Santa Coloma won 5–1 on aggregate.

8 July 2021
20:30

Velež Mostar (Bosnia and Herzegovina)	2–1	(Northern Ireland) Coleraine
Brandao 37' (pen.), 66' (pen.)	Report	Doherty 9'

Stadion Grbavica, Sarajevo (Note: Velež Mostar played their home matches at Stadion Grbavica, Sarajevo, instead of their regular stadium Stadion Rođeni, Mostar, which did not meet UEFA requirements.)
Attendance: 5,000
Referee: Abdulkadir Bitigen (Turkey)
15 July 2021
21:00 (20:00 UTC+1)

Coleraine (Northern Ireland)	1–2	(Bosnia and Herzegovina) Velež Mostar
Shevlin 33'	Report	Brandao 54'; Anđušić 71'

Mourneview Park, Lurgan (Note: Coleraine played their home match at Mourneview Park, Lurgan, instead of their regular stadium The Showgrounds, Coleraine, which did not meet UEFA requirements.)
Attendance: 500
Referee: Balázs Berke (Hungary)

Velež Mostar won 4–2 on aggregate.

8 July 2021
20:00

Domžale (Slovenia)	1–0	(Luxembourg) Swift Hesperange
Žinič 58'	Report

Domžale Sports Park, Domžale
Attendance: 953
Referee: Christian-Petru Ciochirca (Austria)
15 July 2021
20:00

Swift Hesperange (Luxembourg)	1–1	(Slovenia) Domžale
Séné 31'	Report	Käit 60'

Stade Josy Barthel, Luxembourg City (Note: Swift Hesperange played their home match at Stade Josy Barthel, Luxembourg City, instead of their regular stadium Stade Alphonse Theis, Hesperange, which did not meet UEFA requirements.)
Attendance: 673
Referee: Georgi Davidov (Bulgaria)

Domžale won 2–1 on aggregate.

8 July 2021
20:00

Shkupi (North Macedonia)	2–0	(Kosovo) Llapi
Markoski 36'; Rwatubyaye 90+4'	Report

Toše Proeski Arena, Skopje (Note: Shkupi played their home matches at Toše Proeski Arena, Skopje, instead of their regular stadium Čair Stadium, Skopje, which did not meet UEFA requirements.)
Attendance: 1,620
Referee: Allard Lindhout (Netherlands)
15 July 2021
20:00

Llapi (Kosovo)	1–1	(North Macedonia) Shkupi
Fazliu 84'	Report	Ali 78'

Fadil Vokrri Stadium, Pristina (Note: Llapi played their home match at Fadil Vokrri Stadium, Pristina, instead of their regular stadium Zahir Pajaziti Stadium, Podujevo, which did not meet UEFA requirements.)
Attendance: 1,200
Referee: Walter Altmann (Austria)

Shkupi won 3–1 on aggregate.

8 July 2021
20:45

Tre Penne (San Marino)	0–4	(Georgia (country)) Dinamo Batumi
	Report	Pantsulaia 8'; Mamuchashvili 10'; Jighauri 18'; Zaria 58'

San Marino Stadium, Serravalle
Attendance: 271
Referee: Robertas Valikonis (Lithuania)
15 July 2021
18:30 (20:30 UTC+4)

Dinamo Batumi (Georgia (country))	3–0	(San Marino) Tre Penne
Sanogo 16'; Mandzhgaladze 47'; Flamarion 50'	Report

Batumi Stadium, Batumi
Attendance: 8,829
Referee: Veaceslav Banari (Moldova)

Dinamo Batumi won 7–0 on aggregate.

8 July 2021
20:00

Partizani (Albania)	5–2	(Moldova) Sfîntul Gheorghe
Lucas Cardoso 17', 85'; Stênio Júnior 26', 61'; Cara 78'	Report	Volkov 44' (pen.); Solodovnicov 80'

Elbasan Arena, Elbasan
Attendance: 700
Referee: Lukas Fähndrich (Switzerland)
15 July 2021
19:00 (20:00 UTC+3)

Sfîntul Gheorghe (Moldova)	2–3	(Albania) Partizani
Volkov 4' (pen.); Solodovnicov 22'	Report	Cara 15'; Stênio Júnior 42', 55'

CSR Orhei, Orhei (Note: Sfîntul Gheorghe played their home match at CSR Orhei, Orhei, instead of their regular stadium Suruceni Stadium, Suruceni, which did not meet UEFA requirements.)
Attendance: 500
Referee: Vassilis Fotias (Greece)

Partizani won 8–4 on aggregate.

8 July 2021
20:45

Maribor (Slovenia)	1–0	(Armenia) Urartu
Žugelj 56'	Report

Ljudski vrt, Maribor
Attendance: 3,250
Referee: Nathan Verboomen (Belgium)
15 July 2021
18:00 (20:00 UTC+4)

Urartu (Armenia)	0–1	(Slovenia) Maribor
	Report	Šturm 85'

Urartu Stadium, Yerevan
Attendance: 2,114
Referee: Christopher Jaeger (Austria)

Maribor won 2–0 on aggregate.

6 July 2021
20:30

Podgorica (Montenegro)	1–0	(Albania) Laçi
Vujović 57' (pen.)	Report

DG Arena, Podgorica
Attendance: 250
Referee: Bram Van Driessche (Belgium)
15 July 2021
20:00

Laçi (Albania)	3–0 (a.e.t.)	(Montenegro) Podgorica
Ard. Deliu 60'; Lushkja 93'; Prengaj 113'	Report

Elbasan Arena, Elbasan (Note: Laçi played their home matches at Elbasan Arena, Elbasan, instead of their regular stadium Laçi Stadium, Laç, which did not meet UEFA requirements.)
Attendance: 1,000
Referee: Yaroslav Kozyk (Ukraine)

Laçi won 3–1 on aggregate.

8 July 2021
19:00 (20:00 UTC+3)

Milsami Orhei (Moldova)	0–0	(Bosnia and Herzegovina) Sarajevo
	Report

CSR Orhei, Orhei
Attendance: 1,100
Referee: Yasar Kemal Ugurlu (Turkey)
15 July 2021
21:00

Sarajevo (Bosnia and Herzegovina)	0–1	(Moldova) Milsami Orhei
	Report	Gînsari 19'

Asim Ferhatović Hase Stadium, Sarajevo
Attendance: 4,588
Referee: Paul Mclaughlin (Republic of Ireland)

Milsami Orhei won 1–0 on aggregate.

8 July 2021
16:00 (18:00 UTC+4)

Noah (Armenia)	1–0	(Finland) KuPS
Popovitch 77' (o.g.)	Report

Vazgen Sargsyan Republican Stadium, Yerevan (Note: Noah played their home match at Vazgen Sargsyan Republican Stadium, Yerevan, instead of their regular stadium Alashkert Stadium, Yerevan, which did not meet UEFA requirements.)
Attendance: 3,000
Referee: Igor Stojchevski (North Macedonia)
15 July 2021
18:00 (19:00 UTC+3)

KuPS (Finland)	5–0	(Armenia) Noah
Nissilä 13'; Monroy 24' (o.g.); Udo 36'; Uzochukwu 39'; Rangel 89'	Report

Savon Sanomat Areena, Kuopio
Attendance: 1,953
Referee: Novak Simović (Serbia)

KuPS won 5–1 on aggregate.

8 July 2021
18:45

Žilina (Slovakia)	5–1	(Georgia (country)) Dila Gori
Anang 6'; Ďuriš 25', 64'; Bichakhchyan 56' (pen.); Jibril 82'	Report	Nemsadze 84'

Štadión pod Dubňom, Žilina
Attendance: 500
Referee: Philip Farrugia (Malta)
15 July 2021
19:00 (21:00 UTC+4)

Dila Gori (Georgia (country))	2–1	(Slovakia) Žilina
Camara 58'; Wanderson 70'	Report	Bichakhchyan 45+4' (pen.)

Tengiz Burjanadze Stadium, Gori
Attendance: 1,835
Referee: Milos Milanovic (Serbia)

Žilina won 6–3 on aggregate.

8 July 2021
20:00 (18:00 UTC+0)

FH (Iceland)	1–0	(Republic of Ireland) Sligo Rovers
Lennon 85'	Report

Kaplakriki, Hafnarfjörður
Attendance: 412
Referee: Ishmael Barbara (Malta)
15 July 2021
19:00 (18:00 UTC+1)

Sligo Rovers (Republic of Ireland)	1–2	(Iceland) FH
Kenny 84' (pen.)	Report	Lennon 44', 49' (pen.)

The Showgrounds, Sligo
Attendance: 400
Referee: Luís Teixeira (Portugal)

FH won 3–1 on aggregate.

8 July 2021
20:00 (21:00 UTC+3)

Paide Linnameeskond (Estonia)	1–2	(Poland) Śląsk Wrocław
Golla 77' (o.g.)	Report	Piasecki 67'; Tamás 89'

Pärnu Rannastaadion, Pärnu (Note: Paide Linnameeskond played their home match at Pärnu Rannastaadion, Pärnu, instead of their regular stadium Paide linnastaadion, Paide, which did not meet UEFA requirements.)
Attendance: 1,405
Referee: Ashot Ghaltakhchyan (Armenia)
15 July 2021
21:00

Śląsk Wrocław (Poland)	2–0	(Estonia) Paide Linnameeskond
Janasik 41'; García 66'	Report

Stadion Wrocław, Wrocław
Attendance: 10,657
Referee: Luka Bilbija (Bosnia and Herzegovina)

Śląsk Wrocław won 4–1 on aggregate.

8 July 2021
18:00 (19:00 UTC+3)

RFS (Latvia)	2–3	(Faroe Islands) KÍ
Lipušček 50'; Zjuzins 79'	Report	Sumareh 21'; Klettskarð 33'; Vatnsdal 70'

Slokas Stadium, Jūrmala (Note: RFS played their home matches at Slokas Stadium, Jūrmala, instead of their regular stadium Stadions Arkādija, Riga, which did not meet UEFA requirements.)
Attendance: 352
Referee: Nikola Popov (Bulgaria)
15 July 2021
20:00 (19:00 UTC+1)

KÍ (Faroe Islands)	2–4 (a.e.t.)	(Latvia) RFS
Færø 16'; Pavlović 45+2'	Report	Jagodinskis 10'; Lemajić 25'; Deocleciano 27'; Šarić 108'

Við Djúpumýrar, Klaksvík
Attendance: 734
Referee: Keith Kennedy (Northern Ireland)

RFS won 6–5 on aggregate.

8 July 2021
20:00 (19:00 UTC+1)

Bala Town (Wales)	0–1	(Northern Ireland) Larne
	Report	McDaid 2'

Park Hall, Oswestry, England (Note: Bala Town played their home match at Park Hall, Oswestry, England, instead of their regular stadium Maes Tegid, Bala, which did not meet UEFA requirements.)
Attendance: 197
Referee: Mohammad Al-Emara (Finland)
15 July 2021
20:30 (19:30 UTC+1)

Larne (Northern Ireland)	1–0	(Wales) Bala Town
Hale 84'	Report

Inver Park, Larne
Attendance: 850
Referee: Dario Bel (Croatia)

Larne won 2–0 on aggregate.

8 July 2021
20:00

MOL Fehérvár (Hungary)	1–1	(Armenia) Ararat Yerevan
Heister 84'	Report	Pobulić 90+3'

MOL Aréna Sóstó, Székesfehérvár
Attendance: 2,846
Referee: Ion Orlic (Moldova)
15 July 2021
15:00 (17:00 UTC+4)

Ararat Yerevan (Armenia)	2–0	(Hungary) MOL Fehérvár
Pobulić 33'; Silue 85'	Report

Gyumri City Stadium, Gyumri (Note: Ararat played their home matches at Gyumri City Stadium, Gyumri, instead of their regular stadium Vazgen Sargsyan Republican Stadium, Yerevan, due to the proximity of another match.)
Attendance: 1,500
Referee: Igor Pajac (Croatia)

Ararat Yerevan won 3–1 on aggregate.

8 July 2021
20:30

Sutjeska (Montenegro)	1–0	(Georgia (country)) Gagra
M. Vuković 17'	Report

DG Arena, Podgorica (Note: Sutjeska played their home matches at DG Arena, Podgorica, instead of their regular stadium Gradski stadion, Nikšić, which did not meet UEFA requirements.)
Attendance: 400
Referee: Emmanouil Skoulas (Greece)
15 July 2021
18:00 (20:00 UTC+4)

Gagra (Georgia (country))	1–1	(Montenegro) Sutjeska
Makatsaria 86'	Report	Janjić 51'

Mikheil Meskhi Stadium, Tbilisi (Note: Gagra played their home match at Mikheil Meskhi Stadium, Tbilisi, instead of their regular stadium David Petriashvili Arena, Tbilisi, which did not meet UEFA requirements.)
Attendance: 1,600
Referee: Ferenc Karakó (Hungary)

Sutjeska won 2–1 on aggregate.

8 July 2021
16:00

Sileks (North Macedonia)	1–1	(Moldova) Petrocub Hîncești
Dodevski 5'	Report	S. Plătică 45+4'

Petar Miloševski Training Centre, Skopje (Note: Sileks played their home match at Petar Miloševski Training Centre, Skopje, instead of their regular stadium Gradski Stadion Kratovo, Kratovo, which did not meet UEFA requirements.)
Attendance: 110
Referee: Robert Ian Jenkins (Wales)
15 July 2021
19:00 (20:00 UTC+3)

Petrocub Hîncești (Moldova)	1–0	(North Macedonia) Sileks
M. Plătică 90+5'	Report

Zimbru Stadium, Chișinău (Note: Petrocub Hîncești played their home matches at Zimbru Stadium, Chișinău, instead of their regular stadium Stadionul Municipal, Hîncești, which did not meet UEFA requirements.)
Attendance: 1,472
Referee: Elchin Masiyev (Azerbaijan)

Petrocub Hîncești won 2–1 on aggregate.

8 July 2021
21:00

Široki Brijeg (Bosnia and Herzegovina)	3–1	(Albania) Vllaznia
Stanić 43' (pen.), 53' (pen.); Lukić 77'	Report	Çoba 90+2'

Pecara Stadium, Široki Brijeg
Attendance: 2,950
Referee: Aleksei Matyunin (Russia)
15 July 2021
21:00

Vllaznia (Albania)	3–0	(Bosnia and Herzegovina) Široki Brijeg
Gjurgjevikj 46', 78'; Imami 62'	Report

Loro Boriçi Stadium, Shkodër
Attendance: 4,700
Referee: Kaspar Sjöberg (Sweden)

Vllaznia won 4–3 on aggregate.

8 July 2021
21:45 (19:45 UTC+0)

Stjarnan (Iceland)	1–1	(Republic of Ireland) Bohemians
Atlason 25'	Report	Wilson 63'

Stjörnuvöllur, Garðabær
Attendance: 720
Referee: Sandi Putros (Denmark)
15 July 2021
20:45 (19:45 UTC+1)

Bohemians (Republic of Ireland)	3–0	(Iceland) Stjarnan
G. Kelly 34', 54'; Burt 75'	Report

Aviva Stadium, Dublin (Note: Bohemians played their home matches at Aviva Stadium, Dublin, instead of their regular stadium Dalymount Park, Dublin, which did not meet UEFA requirements.)
Attendance: 6,000
Referee: Jason Barcelo (Gibraltar)

Bohemians won 4–1 on aggregate.

8 July 2021
19:45 (18:45 UTC+1)

Glentoran (Northern Ireland)	1–1	(Wales) The New Saints
McDonagh 82'	Report	Smith 13'

The Oval, Belfast
Attendance: 1,021
Referee: Loukas Sotiriou (Cyprus)
15 July 2021
19:15 (18:15 UTC+1)

The New Saints (Wales)	2–0	(Northern Ireland) Glentoran
McManus 26' (pen.); Smith 27'	Report

Park Hall, Oswestry
Attendance: 198
Referee: Ivar Orri Kristjansson (Iceland)

The New Saints won 3–1 on aggregate.

8 July 2021
18:00

Sant Julià (Andorra)	0–0	(Malta) Gżira United
	Report

Estadi Nacional, Andorra la Vella
Attendance: 90
Referee: Haris Kaljanac (Bosnia and Herzegovina)
15 July 2021
20:00

Gżira United (Malta)	1–1 (a.e.t.)	(Andorra) Sant Julià
Mentz 52'	Report	Gomis 23'
Penalties
Maxuell Samurai (penalty scored); Mendonza (penalty scored); Pisani (penalty scored); Mentz (penalty scored); S. Borg (penalty scored)	5–3	(penalty missed) Nimani; (penalty scored) Gomis; (penalty scored) Bacari; (penalty scored) Echaide

Centenary Stadium, Ta' Qali
Attendance: 195
Referee: Vitālijs Spasjoņņikovs (Latvia)

1–1 on aggregate; Gżira United won 5–3 on penalties.

8 July 2021
20:00

Europa (Gibraltar)	0–0	(Lithuania) Kauno Žalgiris
	Report

Victoria Stadium, Gibraltar
Attendance: 365
Referee: Andrew Davey (Northern Ireland)
15 July 2021
18:00 (19:00 UTC+3)

Kauno Žalgiris (Lithuania)	2–0	(Gibraltar) Europa
Naah 40'; Pilibaitis 54'	Report

Sūduva Stadium, Marijampolė (Note: Kauno Žalgiris played their home matches at Sūduva Stadium, Marijampolė, instead of their regular stadium Stadium of Football Academy of Kauno Žalgiris, Kaunas, which did not meet UEFA requirements.)
Attendance: 400
Referee: Irakli Kvirikashvili (Georgia)

Kauno Žalgiris won 2–0 on aggregate.

8 July 2021
18:45 (17:45 UTC+1)

Dundalk (Republic of Ireland)	4–0	(Wales) Newtown
Duffy 33'; McMillan 39'; Patching 62'; Han 90+4'	Report

Oriel Park, Dundalk
Attendance: 120
Referee: Barbeno Luca (San Marino)
13 July 2021
18:45 (17:45 UTC+1)

Newtown (Wales)	0–1	(Republic of Ireland) Dundalk
	Report	Duffy 52'

Park Hall, Oswestry, England (Note: Newtown played their home match at Park Hall, Oswestry, England, instead of their regular stadium Latham Park, Newtown, which did not meet UEFA requirements.)
Attendance: 174
Referee: Andrei Chivulete (Romania)

Dundalk won 5–0 on aggregate.

6 July 2021
17:45

Mosta (Malta)	3–2	(Slovakia) Spartak Trnava
Evo 23'; Failla 27' (pen.); Nsumoh 35'	Report	Twardzik 45+2' (pen.); Mikovič 79'

Centenary Stadium, Ta' Qali
Attendance: 170
Referee: Kristoffer Hagenes (Norway)
15 July 2021
20:45

Spartak Trnava (Slovakia)	2–0	(Malta) Mosta
Twardzik 16'; Bamidele 34'	Report

Štadión Antona Malatinského, Trnava
Attendance: 1,000
Referee: Nejc Kajtazovic (Slovenia)

Spartak Trnava won 4–3 on aggregate.

8 July 2021
16:00 (17:00 UTC+3)

Liepāja (Latvia)	1–1	(North Macedonia) Struga
Dodô 31'	Report	Iseni 90+3'

Daugava Stadium, Liepāja
Attendance: 157
Referee: Viktor Shimusik (Belarus)
15 July 2021
17:00

Struga (North Macedonia)	1–4	(Latvia) Liepāja
Skenderi 57'	Report	Effiong 45'; Dodô 47', 49'; Kārkliņš 62'

Petar Miloševski Training Centre, Skopje (Note: Struga played their home match at Petar Miloševski Training Centre, Skopje, instead of their regular stadium Gradska Plaža Stadium, Struga, which did not meet UEFA requirements.)
Attendance: 195
Referee: Artyom Kuchin (Kazakhstan)

Liepāja won 5–2 on aggregate.

8 July 2021
19:00

Racing Union (Luxembourg)	2–3	(Iceland) Breiðablik
Mabella 15', 34'	Report	Eyjólfsson 37'; Mikkelsen 66'; Muminović 88'

Stade Josy Barthel, Luxembourg City (Note: Racing Luxembourg played their home match at Stade Josy Barthel, Luxembourg City, instead of their regular stadium Stade Achille Hammerel, Luxembourg City, which did not meet UEFA requirements.)
Attendance: 732
Referee: Henrik Nalbandyan (Armenia)
15 July 2021
21:00 (19:00 UTC+0)

Breiðablik (Iceland)	2–0	(Luxembourg) Racing Union
Svanþórsson 50'; Vilhjálmsson 74'	Report

Kópavogsvöllur, Kópavogur
Attendance: 710
Referee: Vitaliy Romanov (Ukraine)

Breiðablik won 5–2 on aggregate.

8 July 2021
18:00 (19:00 UTC+3)

Honka (Finland)	0–0	(Faroe Islands) NSÍ
	Report

Bolt Arena, Helsinki (Note: Honka played their home matches at Bolt Arena, Helsinki, instead of their regular stadium Tapiolan urheilupuisto, Espoo, which did not meet UEFA requirements.)
Attendance: 502
Referee: Vitālijs Spasjonņikovs (Latvia)
15 July 2021
19:00 (18:00 UTC+1)

NSÍ (Faroe Islands)	1–3	(Finland) Honka
J. Nielsen 70'	Report	Dongou 8', 60'; Kaufmann 64'

Svangaskarð, Toftir (Note: NSÍ Runavík played their home match at Svangaskarð, Toftir, instead of their regular stadium Við Løkin, Runavík, which did not meet UEFA requirements.)
Attendance: 250
Referee: Thomas Gary Owen (Wales)

Honka won 3–1 on aggregate.

== Second qualifying round ==
=== Summary ===
The first legs were played on 20, 21 and 22 July, and the second legs were played on 27 and 29 July 2021.

The winners of the ties advanced to the third qualifying round of their respective path. The losers were eliminated from European competitions for the season.

Team 1	Agg.	Team 2	1st leg	2nd leg
Champions Path
Shamrock Rovers (Republic of Ireland)	Bye	N/A	—	—
Teuta (Albania)	3–2	(Andorra) Inter Club d'Escaldes	0–2	3–0 (a.e.t.)
Riga (Latvia)	3–0	(North Macedonia) Shkëndija	2–0	1–0
Dinamo Tbilisi (Georgia (country))	2–7	(Israel) Maccabi Haifa	1–2	1–5
HB (Faroe Islands)	6–0 (Note: Order of legs reversed after original draw.)	(Montenegro) Budućnost Podgorica	4–0	2–0
Linfield (Northern Ireland)	4–0	(Bosnia and Herzegovina) Borac Banja Luka	4–0	0–0
Shakhtyor Soligorsk (Belarus)	1–3	(Luxembourg) Fola Esch	1–2	0–1
Folgore (San Marino)	3–7	(Malta) Hibernians	1–3	2–4
Prishtina (Kosovo)	6–5	(Wales) Connah's Quay Nomads	4–1	2–4
Valur (Iceland)	0–6	(Norway) Bodø/Glimt	0–3	0–3
Main Path
KuPS (Finland)	5–4	(Ukraine) Vorskla Poltava	2–2	3–2 (a.e.t.)
FCSB (Romania)	2–2 (3–5 p)	(Kazakhstan) Shakhter Karagandy	1–0	1–2 (a.e.t.)
Arda (Bulgaria)	0–6	(Israel) Hapoel Be'er Sheva	0–2	0–4
Apollon Limassol (Cyprus)	3–5	(Slovakia) Žilina	1–3	2–2
Čukarički (Serbia)	2–0	(Azerbaijan) Sumgayit	0–0	2–0
Sutjeska (Montenegro)	1–3	(Israel) Maccabi Tel Aviv	0–0	1–3
Astana (Kazakhstan)	3–2	(Greece) Aris	2–0	1–2 (a.e.t.)
Petrocub Hîncești (Moldova)	0–2	(Turkey) Sivasspor	0–1	0–1
AEL Limassol (Cyprus)	2–0	(Albania) Vllaznia	1–0	1–0
Sochi (Russia)	7–2	(Azerbaijan) Keşla	3–0	4–2
IF Elfsborg (Sweden)	9–0	(Moldova) Milsami Orhei	4–0	5–0
RFS (Latvia)	5–0	(Hungary) Puskás Akadémia	3–0	2–0
Dinamo Batumi (Georgia (country))	4–2	(Belarus) BATE Borisov	0–1	4–1
Partizan (Serbia)	3–0	(Slovakia) DAC Dunajská Streda	1–0	2–0
Dundalk (Republic of Ireland)	4–3	(Estonia) FCI Levadia	2–2	2–1
Gżira United (Malta)	0–3	(Croatia) Rijeka	0–2	0–1
Viktoria Plzeň (Czech Republic)	4–2	(Belarus) Dynamo Brest	2–1	2–1
Kauno Žalgiris (Lithuania)	1–10	(Wales) The New Saints	0–5	1–5
Domžale (Slovenia)	2–1	(Finland) Honka	1–1	1–0
CSKA Sofia (Bulgaria)	0–0 (3–1 p)	(Latvia) Liepāja	0–0	0–0 (a.e.t.)
Shkupi (North Macedonia)	0–5	(Portugal) Santa Clara	0–3	0–2
Hibernian (Scotland)	5–1	(Andorra) FC Santa Coloma	3–0	2–1
Larne (Northern Ireland)	3–2	(Denmark) AGF	2–1	1–1
Gent (Belgium)	4–2	(Norway) Vålerenga	4–0	0–2
F91 Dudelange (Luxembourg)	0–4	(Republic of Ireland) Bohemians	0–1	0–3
Velež Mostar (Bosnia and Herzegovina)	2–2 (3–2 p)	(Greece) AEK Athens	2–1	0–1 (a.e.t.)
Qarabağ (Azerbaijan)	1–0	(Israel) Ashdod	0–0	1–0
Lokomotiv Plovdiv (Bulgaria)	1–1 (3–2 p)	(Czech Republic) Slovácko	1–0	0–1 (a.e.t.)
Ararat Yerevan (Armenia)	5–7	(Poland) Śląsk Wrocław	2–4	3–3
Laçi (Albania)	1–0	(Romania) Universitatea Craiova	1–0	0–0
Drita (Kosovo)	2–3	(Netherlands) Feyenoord	0–0	2–3
Basel (Switzerland)	5–0	(Albania) Partizani	3–0	2–0
Pogoń Szczecin (Poland)	0–1	(Croatia) Osijek	0–0	0–1
Austria Wien	2–3	(Iceland) Breiðablik	1–1	1–2
Olimpija Ljubljana (Slovenia)	1–1 (5–4 p)	(Malta) Birkirkara	1–0	0–1 (a.e.t.)
Hammarby IF (Sweden)	4–1	(Slovenia) Maribor	3–1	1–0
Molde (Norway)	3–2	(Switzerland) Servette	3–0	0–2
Újpest (Hungary)	5–2	(Liechtenstein) Vaduz	2–1	3–1
Sūduva (Lithuania)	0–0 (3–4 p)	(Poland) Raków Częstochowa	0–0	0–0 (a.e.t.)
Spartak Trnava (Slovakia)	1–1 (4–3 p)	(Romania) Sepsi OSK	0–0	1–1 (a.e.t.)
FH (Iceland)	1–6	(Norway) Rosenborg	0–2	1–4
Copenhagen (Denmark)	9–1	(Belarus) Torpedo-BelAZ Zhodino	4–1	5–0
Panevėžys (Lithuania)	0–2	(Serbia) Vojvodina	0–1	0–1
Hajduk Split (Croatia)	3–4	(Kazakhstan) Tobol	2–0	1–4 (a.e.t.)
Aberdeen (Scotland)	5–3	(Sweden) BK Häcken	5–1	0–2

=== Champions Path matches ===
22 July 2021
19:00

Teuta (Albania)	0–2	(Andorra) Inter Club d'Escaldes
	Report	Soldevila 37', 56'

Niko Dovana Stadium, Durrës
Attendance: 700
Referee: Rauf Jabarov (Azerbaijan)
27 July 2021
17:45

Inter Club d'Escaldes (Andorra)	0–3 (a.e.t.)	(Albania) Teuta
	Report	Plaku 25', 80'; Kallaku 105+1' (pen.)

Estadi Nacional, Andorra la Vella
Attendance: 130
Referee: Viktor Kopiievskyi (Ukraine)

Teuta won 3–2 on aggregate.

22 July 2021
19:00 (20:00 UTC+3)

Riga (Latvia)	2–0	(North Macedonia) Shkëndija
Wesley 13'; Vakulko 52'	Report

Skonto Stadium, Riga
Attendance: 601
Referee: Ondrej Pechanec (Czech Republic)
29 July 2021
20:00

Shkëndija (North Macedonia)	0–1	(Latvia) Riga
	Report	Soisalo 52'

Toše Proeski Arena, Skopje (Note: Shkëndija played their home match at Toše Proeski Arena, Skopje, instead of their regular stadium Ecolog Arena, Tetovo, which did not meet UEFA requirements.)
Attendance: 2,000
Referee: Fabio Maresca (Italy)

Riga won 3–0 on aggregate.

22 July 2021
18:30 (20:30 UTC+4)

Dinamo Tbilisi (Georgia (country))	1–2	(Israel) Maccabi Haifa
Papava 89'	Report	Atzili 8'; David 66'

Boris Paichadze Dinamo Arena, Tbilisi
Attendance: 4,234
Referee: Lukas Fähndrich (Switzerland)
29 July 2021
19:00 (20:00 UTC+3)

Maccabi Haifa (Israel)	5–1	(Georgia (country)) Dinamo Tbilisi
M. Levi 17'; Sporkslede 37' (o.g.); Atzili 75'; Ashkenazi 81', 85'	Report	Barnes 24'

Sammy Ofer Stadium, Haifa
Attendance: 13,100
Referee: Amine Kourgheli (Belarus)

Maccabi Haifa won 7–2 on aggregate.

22 July 2021
20:00 (19:00 UTC+1)

HB (Faroe Islands)	4–0	(Montenegro) Budućnost Podgorica
Przybylski 45', 47'; Petersen 58'; Johansen 66' (pen.)	Report

Gundadalur, Tórshavn
Attendance: 450
Referee: David Munro (Scotland)
27 July 2021
20:00

Budućnost Podgorica (Montenegro)	0–2	(Faroe Islands) HB
	Report	Mohr 39'; Johansen 73' (pen.)

Stadion pod Goricom, Podgorica
Attendance: 1,200
Referee: Andrew Davey (Northern Ireland)

HB won 6–0 on aggregate.

22 July 2021
20:45 (19:45 UTC+1)

Linfield (Northern Ireland)	4–0	(Bosnia and Herzegovina) Borac Banja Luka
Newberry 2'; Manzinga 25'; Mulgrew 75'; Callacher 90+2'	Report

Windsor Park, Belfast
Attendance: 995
Referee: Kaarlo Oskari Hämäläinen (Finland)
29 July 2021
20:00

Borac Banja Luka (Bosnia and Herzegovina)	0–0	(Northern Ireland) Linfield
	Report

Banja Luka City Stadium, Banja Luka
Attendance: 5,208
Referee: Zaven Hovhannisyan (Armenia)

Linfield won 4–0 on aggregate.

22 July 2021
21:30

Shakhtyor Soligorsk (Belarus)	1–2	(Luxembourg) Fola Esch
Stasevich 67'	Report	Omosanya 19'; Mustafić 44'

Diósgyőri Stadion, Miskolc, Hungary (Note: Shakhtyor Soligorsk played their home match at Diósgyőri Stadion, Miskolc, Hungary, instead of their regular stadium Stroitel Stadium, Soligorsk, as in June 2021 UEFA suspended most matches to be played in Belarus, due to European Union sanctions in response to the Ryanair Flight 4978 incident which banned European Union airlines from flying over Belarusian airspace.)
Attendance: 0
Referee: Lazar Lukić (Serbia)
29 July 2021
19:30

Fola Esch (Luxembourg)	1–0	(Belarus) Shakhtyor Soligorsk
Delgado 52'	Report

Stade Émile Mayrisch, Esch-sur-Alzette
Attendance: 455
Referee: Yaroslav Kozyk (Ukraine)

Fola Esch won 3–1 on aggregate.

20 July 2021
21:00

Folgore (San Marino)	1–3	(Malta) Hibernians
Fedeli 5'	Report	Degabriele 13'; J. Grech 26', 83'

San Marino Stadium, Serravalle
Attendance: 164
Referee: Timotheos Christofi (Cyprus)
27 July 2021
20:00

Hibernians (Malta)	4–2	(San Marino) Folgore
Degabriele 9', 66'; Domoraud 47'; J. Grech 77'	Report	Fedeli 28'; Jassey 45+1'

Centenary Stadium, Ta'Qali
Attendance: 267
Referee: Arda Kardeşler (Turkey)

Hibernians won 7–3 on aggregate.

20 July 2021
18:00

Prishtina (Kosovo)	4–1	(Wales) Connah's Quay Nomads
Bekteshi 41'; Otto John 53', 90+4'; E. Krasniqi 79'	Report	Moore 75'

Fadil Vokrri Stadium, Pristina
Attendance: 1,268
Referee: Eldorjan Hamiti (Albania)
29 July 2021
20:00 (19:00 UTC+1)

Connah's Quay Nomads (Wales)	4–2	(Kosovo) Prishtina
Insall 3', 57'; Horan 47'; Morris 82' (pen.)	Report	E. Krasniqi 29', 36'

Park Avenue, Aberystwyth (Note: Connah's Quay Nomads played their home match at Park Avenue, Aberystwyth, instead of their regular stadium Deeside Stadium, Connah's Quay, which did not meet UEFA requirements.)
Attendance: 108
Referee: Petri Viljanen (Finland)

Prishtina won 6–5 on aggregate.

22 July 2021
21:00 (19:00 UTC+0)

Valur (Iceland)	0–3	(Norway) Bodø/Glimt
	Report	Saltnes 40'; Berg 51' (pen.), 54'

Hlíðarendi, Reykjavík
Attendance: 623
Referee: Vitor Ferreira (Portugal)
29 July 2021
18:00

Bodø/Glimt (Norway)	3–0	(Iceland) Valur
Saltnes 26'; Moe 61'; Hagen 90+3'	Report

Aspmyra Stadion, Bodø
Attendance: 2,000
Referee: Paolo Valeri (Italy)

Bodø/Glimt won 6–0 on aggregate.

=== Main Path matches ===
22 July 2021
18:00 (19:00 UTC+3)

KuPS (Finland)	2–2	(Ukraine) Vorskla Poltava
Udo 6'; Tomas 90+6'	Report	Kane 29'; Thill 55' (pen.)

Kuopio Football Stadium, Kuopio
Attendance: 2,173
Referee: Dzmitry Dzmitryieu (Belarus)
29 July 2021
18:00 (19:00 UTC+3)

Vorskla Poltava (Ukraine)	2–3 (a.e.t.)	(Finland) KuPS
Thill 48'; Sklyar 55'	Report	Sebban 49'; Nissilä 90+3'; Rangel 111'

Butovsky Vorskla Stadium, Poltava
Attendance: 7,655
Referee: Pavel Orel (Czech Republic)

KuPS won 5–4 on aggregate.

22 July 2021
20:30 (21:30 UTC+3)

FCSB (Romania)	1–0	(Kazakhstan) Shakhter Karagandy
Cordea 38'	Report

Arena Națională, Bucharest
Attendance: 5,812
Referee: Vasilis Dimitriou (Cyprus)
29 July 2021
15:00 (17:00 UTC+4)

Shakhter Karagandy (Kazakhstan)	2–1 (a.e.t.)	(Romania) FCSB
Gabyshev 11'; Tattybaev 90+1'	Report	Coman 76'
Penalties
Rustemović (penalty scored); Bukorac (penalty scored); Graf (penalty scored); Atanaskoski (penalty scored); Tattybaev (penalty scored)	5–3	(penalty scored) Coman; (penalty scored) Crețu; (penalty missed) Moruțan; (penalty scored) Vučur

Vazgen Sargsyan Republican Stadium, Yerevan, Armenia (Note: Shakhter Karagandy played their second qualifying round home match at Vazgen Sargsyan Republican Stadium, Yerevan, Armenia, instead of their regular stadium Shakhter Stadium, Karagandy, due to the COVID-19 pandemic in Kazakhstan and travel restrictions between Kazakhstan and Romania.)
Attendance: 0
Referee: Dragomir Draganov (Bulgaria)

2–2 on aggregate; Shakhter Karagandy won 5–3 on penalties.

22 July 2021
20:00 (21:00 UTC+3)

Arda (Bulgaria)	0–2	(Israel) Hapoel Be'er Sheva
	Report	Bareiro 52'; Micha 78'

Arena Arda, Kardzhali
Attendance: 4,460
Referee: Visar Kastrati (Kosovo)
29 July 2021
19:00 (20:00 UTC+3)

Hapoel Be'er Sheva (Israel)	4–0	(Bulgaria) Arda
Acolatse 5'; Safouri 31' (pen.); Ansah 71'; Hatuel 84'	Report

HaMoshava Stadium, Petah Tikva (Note: Hapoel Be'er Sheva played their second and third qualifying home matches rounds at HaMoshava Stadium, Petah Tikva, instead of their regular stadium Turner Stadium, Be'er Sheva, due to renovation.)
Attendance: 6,537
Referee: Daniele Doveri (Italy)

Hapoel Be'er Sheva won 6–0 on aggregate.

22 July 2021
19:00 (20:00 UTC+3)

Apollon Limassol (Cyprus)	1–3	(Slovakia) Žilina
Jradi 25'	Report	Ďuriš 5'; Bernát 45+1', 52' (pen.)

AEK Arena – Georgios Karapatakis, Larnaca (Note: Apollon Limassol played their home match at AEK Arena, Larnaca, instead of their regular stadium Tsirion Stadium, Limassol, as another match is taking place at the same day.)
Attendance: 1,805
Referee: Luca Barbeno (San Marino)
29 July 2021
18:45

Žilina (Slovakia)	2–2	(Cyprus) Apollon Limassol
Bernát 27'; Jibril 79'	Report	Coll 13'; Jradi 51'

Štadión pod Dubňom, Žilina
Attendance: 1,726
Referee: Alexandre Boucaut (Belgium)

Žilina won 5–3 on aggregate.

21 July 2021
20:00

Čukarički (Serbia)	0–0	(Azerbaijan) Sumgayit
	Report

Čukarički Stadium, Belgrade
Attendance: 1,200
Referee: Urs Schnyder (Switzerland)
29 July 2021
18:00 (20:00 UTC+4)

Sumgayit (Azerbaijan)	0–2	(Serbia) Čukarički
	Report	N'Diaye 10'; Docić 16' (pen.)

Kapital Bank Arena, Sumgayit
Attendance: 750
Referee: Jørgen Burchardt (Denmark)

Čukarički won 2–0 on aggregate.

22 July 2021
20:30

Sutjeska (Montenegro)	0–0	(Israel) Maccabi Tel Aviv
	Report

DG Arena, Podgorica
Attendance: 440
Referee: Christopher Jaeger (Austria)
29 July 2021
19:30 (20:30 UTC+3)

Maccabi Tel Aviv (Israel)	3–1	(Montenegro) Sutjeska
Khalaila 25', 34'; Almog 90+2'	Report	Bubanja 51'

Bloomfield Stadium, Tel Aviv
Attendance: 10,413
Referee: Peter Kjaesgaard (Denmark)

Maccabi Tel Aviv won 3–1 on aggregate.

22 July 2021
15:00 (19:00 UTC+6)

Astana (Kazakhstan)	2–0	(Greece) Aris
Tomasov 25', 71'	Report

Astana Arena, Nur-Sultan
Attendance: 0
Referee: Bastian Dankert (Germany)
29 July 2021
20:30 (21:30 UTC+3)

Aris (Greece)	2–1 (a.e.t.)	(Kazakhstan) Astana
Manos 36'; Lucas Sasha 78'	Report	Bitri 120+1'

Kleanthis Vikelidis Stadium, Thessaloniki
Attendance: 10,000
Referee: Michael Fabbri (Italy)

Astana won 3–2 on aggregate.

22 July 2021
19:00 (20:00 UTC+3)

Petrocub Hîncești (Moldova)	0–1	(Turkey) Sivasspor
	Report	Osmanpaşa 16'

Zimbru Stadium, Chișinău
Attendance: 2,143
Referee: Jérémie Pignard (France)
29 July 2021
19:00 (20:00 UTC+3)

Sivasspor (Turkey)	1–0	(Moldova) Petrocub Hîncești
Kayode 65'	Report

Sivas Stadium, Sivas
Attendance: 8,504
Referee: Kirill Levnikov (Russia)

Sivasspor won 2–0 on aggregate.

22 July 2021
19:00 (20:00 UTC+3)

AEL Limassol (Cyprus)	1–0	(Albania) Vllaznia
Šćepović 45+2'	Report

Tsirion Stadium, Limassol
Attendance: 1,767
Referee: Mads-Kristoffer Kristoffersen (Denmark)
29 July 2021
21:00

Vllaznia (Albania)	0–1	(Cyprus) AEL Limassol
	Report	Šćepović 20'

Loro Boriçi Stadium, Shkodër
Attendance: 4,700
Referee: Rob Harvey (Republic of Ireland)

AEL Limassol won 2–0 on aggregate.

22 July 2021
18:00 (19:00 UTC+3)

Sochi (Russia)	3–0	(Azerbaijan) Keşla
Rodrigão 10'; Noboa 67' (pen.); Barsov 81'	Report

Fisht Olympic Stadium, Sochi
Attendance: 0
Referee: Enea Jorgji (Albania)
29 July 2021
18:00 (20:00 UTC+4)

Keşla (Azerbaijan)	2–4	(Russia) Sochi
Felipe Santos 35'; Hajiyev 52'	Report	Dugandžić 21', 82'; Burmistrov 38'; Prokhin 70'

ASK Arena, Baku
Attendance: 870
Referee: Viktor Shimusik (Belarus)

Sochi won 7–2 on aggregate.

22 July 2021
18:45

IF Elfsborg (Sweden)	4–0	(Moldova) Milsami Orhei
Väisänen 2'; Okkels 25'; Frick 43'; Holst 82'	Report

Borås Arena, Borås
Attendance: 2,163
Referee: Aleksei Matyunin (Russia)
29 July 2021
19:00 (20:00 UTC+3)

Milsami Orhei (Moldova)	0–5	(Sweden) IF Elfsborg
	Report	Ndione 5', 25', 64'; Frick 8'; Cooper Love 56'

CSR Orhei, Orhei
Attendance: 600
Referee: David Coote (England)

IF Elfsborg won 9–0 on aggregate.

22 July 2021
18:00 (19:00 UTC+3)

RFS (Latvia)	3–0	(Hungary) Puskás Akadémia
Lemajić 8', 25' (pen.); Friesenbichler 18'	Report

Slokas Stadium, Jūrmala
Attendance: 315
Referee: Goga Kikacheishvili (Georgia)
29 July 2021
20:00

Puskás Akadémia (Hungary)	0–2	(Latvia) RFS
	Report	Lemajić 52'; Deocleciano 69'

Pancho Aréna, Felcsút
Attendance: 980
Referee: Walter Altmann (Austria)

RFS won 5–0 on aggregate.

22 July 2021
19:00 (21:00 UTC+4)

Dinamo Batumi (Georgia (country))	0–1	(Belarus) BATE Borisov
	Report	Nyakhaychyk 83'

Batumi Stadium, Batumi
Attendance: 10,041
Referee: Artyom Kuchin (Kazakhstan)
29 July 2021
20:00 (21:00 UTC+3)

BATE Borisov (Belarus)	1–4	(Georgia (country)) Dinamo Batumi
Yablonskiy 45+3'	Report	Mamuchashvili 48' (pen.); Flamarion 59'; Azarovi 74'; Pantsulaia 90+5'

Borisov Arena, Barysaw
Attendance: 7,120
Referee: Urs Schnyder (Switzerland)

Dinamo Batumi won 4–2 on aggregate.

22 July 2021
21:00

Partizan (Serbia)	1–0	(Slovakia) DAC Dunajská Streda
Marković 19'	Report

Partizan Stadium, Belgrade
Attendance: 10,131
Referee: Jens Maae (Denmark)
29 July 2021
20:45

DAC Dunajská Streda (Slovakia)	0–2	(Serbia) Partizan
	Report	Pantić 20'; Ricardo 80'

MOL Aréna, Dunajská Streda
Attendance: 4,085
Referee: Alain Bieri (Switzerland)

Partizan won 3–0 on aggregate.

22 July 2021
21:00 (20:00 UTC+1)

Dundalk (Republic of Ireland)	2–2	(Estonia) FCI Levadia
Patching 3'; McMillan 27'	Report	Vaštšuk 2', 19'

Tallaght Stadium, Tallaght (Note: Dundalk played their home match at Tallaght Stadium, Tallaght, instead of their regular stadium Oriel Park, Dundalk, which did not meet UEFA requirements.)
Attendance: 880
Referee: Miroslav Zelinka (Czech Republic)
29 July 2021
18:30 (19:30 UTC+3)

FCI Levadia (Estonia)	1–2	(Republic of Ireland) Dundalk
Agyiri 17'	Report	McMillan 44'; Patching 90+2'

Lilleküla Stadium, Tallinn
Attendance: 1,875
Referee: Thorvaldur Árnason (Iceland)

Dundalk won 4–3 on aggregate.

22 July 2021
19:00

Gżira United (Malta)	0–2	(Croatia) Rijeka
	Report	Bušnja 57'; Ampem 77'

Centenary Stadium, Ta'Qali
Attendance: 234
Referee: Neil Doyle (Republic of Ireland)
29 July 2021
20:00

Rijeka (Croatia)	1–0	(Malta) Gżira United
Drmić 27'	Report

Stadion Rujevica, Rijeka
Attendance: 2,187
Referee: Veaceslav Banari (Moldova)

Rijeka won 3–0 on aggregate.

22 July 2021
19:00

Viktoria Plzeň (Czech Republic)	2–1	(Belarus) Dynamo Brest
Šulc 22'; Kaša 33'	Report	Shestyuk 79'

Doosan Arena, Plzeň
Attendance: 4,468
Referee: Jonathan Lardot (Belgium)
29 July 2021
18:00 (20:00 UTC+4)

Dynamo Brest (Belarus)	1–2	(Czech Republic) Viktoria Plzeň
Bilenkyi 90+1'	Report	Kayamba 12'; Řezník 71'

Technical Center-Academy of the Football Federation of Armenia, Yerevan, Armenia (Note: Dynamo Brest played their home match at Technical Center-Academy of the Football Federation of Armenia, Yerevan, Armenia, instead of their regular stadium Regional Sport Complex Brestsky, Brest, as in June 2021 UEFA suspended most matches to be played in Belarus, due to European Union sanctions in response to the Ryanair Flight 4978 incident which banned European Union airlines from flying over Belarusian airspace.)
Attendance: 0
Referee: Mohammed Al-Hakim (Sweden)

Viktoria Plzeň won 4–2 on aggregate.

20 July 2021
18:00 (19:00 UTC+3)

Kauno Žalgiris (Lithuania)	0–5	(Wales) The New Saints
	Report	Smith 8'; D. Davies 35', 38'; McManus 40'; J. Williams 87'

Sūduva Stadium, Marijampolė
Attendance: 550
Referee: Adrien Jaccottet (Switzerland)
29 July 2021
19:15 (18:15 UTC+1)

The New Saints (Wales)	5–1	(Lithuania) Kauno Žalgiris
Redmond 13'; Robles 20'; McManus 25'; Smith 69'; D. Davies 74'	Report	Thuíque 84'

Park Hall, Oswestry
Attendance: 362
Referee: Emmanouil Skoulas (Greece)

The New Saints won 10–1 on aggregate.

20 July 2021
17:55

Domžale (Slovenia)	1–1	(Finland) Honka
Jakupović 69'	Report	Dongou 76'

Domžale Sports Park, Domžale
Attendance: 700
Referee: Kristoffer Karlsson (Sweden)
29 July 2021
18:00 (19:00 UTC+3)

Honka (Finland)	0–1	(Slovenia) Domžale
	Report	Jakupović 22'

Bolt Arena, Helsinki
Attendance: 685
Referee: Peter Kráľovič (Slovakia)

Domžale won 2–1 on aggregate.

22 July 2021
19:00 (20:00 UTC+3)

CSKA Sofia (Bulgaria)	0–0	(Latvia) Liepāja
	Report

Bulgarian Army Stadium, Sofia
Attendance: 2,600
Referee: Peter Bankes (England)
29 July 2021
16:00 (17:00 UTC+3)

Liepāja (Latvia)	0–0 (a.e.t.)	(Bulgaria) CSKA Sofia
	Report
Penalties
Simić (penalty scored); Tkachuk (penalty missed); Šabala (penalty missed); Keita (penalty missed)	1–3	(penalty scored) Carey; (penalty scored) Caicedo; (penalty missed) Ahmedov; (penalty scored) Geferson

Daugava Stadium, Liepāja
Attendance: 453
Referee: Marcel Birsan (Romania)

0–0 on aggregate; CSKA Sofia won 3–1 on penalties.

22 July 2021
20:00

Shkupi (North Macedonia)	0–3	(Portugal) Santa Clara
	Report	Rwatubyaye 30' (o.g.); Carlos 49'; Costinha 90+3'

Toše Proeski Arena, Skopje
Attendance: 2,000
Referee: Kai Erik Steen (Norway)
29 July 2021
22:00 (20:00 UTC+0)

Santa Clara (Portugal)	2–0	(North Macedonia) Shkupi
Carlos 13'; Villanueva 39'	Report

Estádio de São Miguel, Ponta Delgada
Attendance: 1,000
Referee: Rob Hennessy (Republic of Ireland)

Santa Clara won 5–0 on aggregate.

22 July 2021
20:45 (19:45 UTC+1)

Hibernian (Scotland)	3–0	(Andorra) FC Santa Coloma
Boyle 14' (pen.), 47'; Nisbet 81'	Report

Easter Road, Edinburgh
Attendance: 4,697
Referee: Vilhjalmur Thorarinsson (Iceland)
29 July 2021
18:30

FC Santa Coloma (Andorra)	1–2	(Scotland) Hibernian
Lopez 70'	Report	Murphy 73'; MacKay 76'

Estadi Nacional, Andorra la Vella
Attendance: 80
Referee: Alex Troleis (Faroe Islands)

Hibernian won 5–1 on aggregate.

22 July 2021
20:30 (19:30 UTC+1)

Larne (Northern Ireland)	2–1	(Denmark) AGF
McDaid 3'; Jarvis 30'	Report	Ammitzbøll 86'

Inver Park, Larne
Attendance: 850
Referee: Gal Leibovitz (Israel)
29 July 2021
19:00

AGF (Denmark)	1–1	(Northern Ireland) Larne
Olsen 73' (pen.)	Report	Hale 45'

Ceres Park, Aarhus
Attendance: 5,170
Referee: Volen Chinkov (Bulgaria)

Larne won 3–2 on aggregate.

22 July 2021
20:30

Gent (Belgium)	4–0	(Norway) Vålerenga
Bruno 11'; Tissoudali 39'; Odjidja-Ofoe 56'; Malede 88'	Report

Ghelamco Arena, Ghent
Attendance: 3,823
Referee: Mario Zebec (Croatia)
29 July 2021
19:00

Vålerenga (Norway)	2–0	(Belgium) Gent
Okumu 11' (o.g.); Näsberg 81'	Report

Intility Arena, Oslo
Attendance: 2,000
Referee: Donald Robertson (Scotland)

Gent won 4–2 on aggregate.

22 July 2021
18:30

F91 Dudelange (Luxembourg)	0–1	(Republic of Ireland) Bohemians
	Report	Tierney 11'

Stade Jos Nosbaum, Dudelange
Attendance: 625
Referee: Nejc Kajtazovic (Slovenia)
29 July 2021
20:45 (19:45 UTC+1)

Bohemians (Republic of Ireland)	3–0	(Luxembourg) F91 Dudelange
Cornwall 35'; G. Kelly 69', 73'	Report

Aviva Stadium, Dublin
Attendance: 6,500
Referee: Gergő Bogár (Hungary)

Bohemians won 4–0 on aggregate.

22 July 2021
20:30

Velež Mostar (Bosnia and Herzegovina)	2–1	(Greece) AEK Athens
Pršeš 14'; Zajmović 53'	Report	Ansarifard 12'

Stadion Grbavica, Sarajevo
Attendance: 6,128
Referee: Nathan Verboomen (Belgium)
29 July 2021
20:00 (21:00 UTC+3)

AEK Athens (Greece)	1–0 (a.e.t.)	(Bosnia and Herzegovina) Velež Mostar
Mantalos 90+8'	Report
Penalties
Ansarifard (penalty missed); Tzavellas (penalty scored); Shakhov (penalty scored); Lopes (penalty missed); Araujo (penalty missed)	2–3	(penalty missed) Georgijević; (penalty scored) Brandao; (penalty missed) Vehabović; (penalty scored) Cvijanović; (penalty scored) Zvonić

Athens Olympic Stadium, Athens
Attendance: 5,160
Referee: Kevin Clancy (Scotland)

2–2 on aggregate; Velež Mostar won 3–2 on penalties.

22 July 2021
18:00 (20:00 UTC+4)

Qarabağ (Azerbaijan)	0–0	(Israel) Ashdod
	Report

Tofiq Bahramov Republican Stadium, Baku
Attendance: 8,231
Referee: Serhiy Boyko (Ukraine)
29 July 2021
19:00 (20:00 UTC+3)

Ashdod (Israel)	0–1	(Azerbaijan) Qarabağ
	Report	Ozobić 6'

Yud-Alef Stadium, Ashdod
Attendance: 2,410
Referee: Novak Simović (Serbia)

Qarabağ won 1–0 on aggregate.

22 July 2021
19:00 (20:00 UTC+3)

Lokomotiv Plovdiv (Bulgaria)	1–0	(Czech Republic) Slovácko
Vitanov 89'	Report

Stadion Lokomotiv, Plovdiv
Attendance: 3,250
Referee: Karim Abed (France)
29 July 2021
19:00

Slovácko (Czech Republic)	1–0 (a.e.t.)	(Bulgaria) Lokomotiv Plovdiv
Daníček 26'	Report
Penalties
Daníček (penalty missed); Holzer (penalty missed); Kohút (penalty missed); Jurečka (penalty scored); Kadlec (penalty scored)	2–3	(penalty scored) Iliev; (penalty missed) Salinas; (penalty scored) Ruane; (penalty missed) Yanchev; (penalty scored) Karagaren

Městský fotbalový stadion, Uherské Hradiště
Attendance: 4,208
Referee: Andrew Madley (England)

1–1 on aggregate; Lokomotiv Plovdiv won 3–2 on penalties.

22 July 2021
15:00 (17:00 UTC+4)

Ararat Yerevan (Armenia)	2–4	(Poland) Śląsk Wrocław
Bravo 49'; Ra. Hakobyan 84'	Report	Golla 20'; Piasecki 50'; Pich 70', 90+1'

Gyumri City Stadium, Gyumri
Attendance: 2,350
Referee: Nikola Popov (Bulgaria)
29 July 2021
20:00

Śląsk Wrocław (Poland)	3–3	(Armenia) Ararat Yerevan
Pich 2', 65'; Lewkot 58'	Report	Kone 40', 42'; Silue 89'

Stadion Wrocław, Wrocław
Attendance: 10,245
Referee: Iwan Arwel Griffith (Wales)

Śląsk Wrocław won 7–5 on aggregate.

22 July 2021
19:00

Laçi (Albania)	1–0	(Romania) Universitatea Craiova
Zarubica 36'	Report

Elbasan Arena, Elbasan
Attendance: 200
Referee: Rohit Saggi (Norway)
29 July 2021
20:30 (21:30 UTC+3)

Universitatea Craiova (Romania)	0–0	(Albania) Laçi
	Report

Ion Oblemenco, Craiova
Attendance: 31
Referee: Mattias Gestranius (Finland)

Laçi won 1–0 on aggregate.

22 July 2021
21:00

Drita (Kosovo)	0–0	(Netherlands) Feyenoord
	Report

Fadil Vokrri Stadium, Pristina
Attendance: 2,400
Referee: Antti Munukka (Finland)
29 July 2021
20:00

Feyenoord (Netherlands)	3–2	(Kosovo) Drita
Til 7', 67', 90'	Report	Simonovski 12'; Fazliu 16'

De Kuip, Rotterdam
Attendance: 25,612
Referee: Espen Eskås (Norway)

Feyenoord won 3–2 on aggregate.

22 July 2021
20:15

Basel (Switzerland)	3–0	(Albania) Partizani
Stocker 43', 80'; Cabral 52'	Report

St. Jakob-Park, Basel
Attendance: 6,095
Referee: Dennis Higler (Netherlands)
29 July 2021
20:00

Partizani (Albania)	0–2	(Switzerland) Basel
	Report	Stocker 37'; Cabral 50'

Elbasan Arena, Elbasan
Attendance: 950
Referee: Aristotelis Diamantopoulos (Greece)

Basel won 5–0 on aggregate.

22 July 2021
21:00

Pogoń Szczecin (Poland)	0–0	(Croatia) Osijek
	Report

Stadion im. Floriana Krygiera, Szczecin
Attendance: 6,615
Referee: Horațiu Feșnic (Romania)
29 July 2021
21:00

Osijek (Croatia)	1–0	(Poland) Pogoń Szczecin
Kleinheisler 44'	Report

Gradski Vrt Stadium, Osijek
Attendance: 3,816
Referee: Luis Godinho (Portugal)

Osijek won 1–0 on aggregate.

22 July 2021
18:00

Austria Wien	1–1	(Iceland) Breiðablik
Djuricin 32'	Report	Sigurðarson 47'

Franz Horr Stadium, Vienna
Attendance: 6,015
Referee: Kári Á Høvdanum (Faroe Islands)
29 July 2021
21:00 (19:00 UTC+0)

Breiðablik (Iceland)	2–1	Austria Wien
Steindórsson 6'; Vilhjálmsson 24'	Report	Fitz 68'

Kópavogsvöllur, Kópavogur
Attendance: 697
Referee: Paul McLaughlin (Republic of Ireland)

Breiðablik won 3–2 on aggregate.

22 July 2021
18:00

Olimpija Ljubljana (Slovenia)	1–0	(Malta) Birkirkara
Nukić 78'	Report

Ljubljana Sports Park, Ljubljana
Attendance: 1,200
Referee: David Fuxman (Israel)
29 July 2021
18:00

Birkirkara (Malta)	1–0 (a.e.t.)	(Slovenia) Olimpija Ljubljana
Venâncio 27'	Report
Penalties
Pepe (penalty scored); Venâncio (penalty scored); Bezzina (penalty scored); Aguirre (penalty scored); Mbong (penalty missed)	4–5	(penalty scored) Elšnik; (penalty scored) Špehar; (penalty scored) Tomić; (penalty scored) Ostrc; (penalty scored) Aldair

Centenary Stadium, Ta'Qali
Attendance: 283
Referee: Bram Van Driessche (Belgium)

1–1 on aggregate; Olimpija Ljubljana won 5–4 on penalties.

22 July 2021
18:45

Hammarby IF (Sweden)	3–1	(Slovenia) Maribor
Selmani 55', 64', 87' (pen.)	Report	Žugelj 60'

Tele2 Arena, Stockholm
Attendance: 7,250
Referee: Nicholas Walsh (Scotland)
29 July 2021
20:45

Maribor (Slovenia)	0–1	(Sweden) Hammarby IF
	Report	Accam 5'

Ljudski vrt, Maribor
Attendance: 5,025
Referee: Juan Martínez Munuera (Spain)

Hammarby IF won 4–1 on aggregate.

22 July 2021
18:00

Molde (Norway)	3–0	(Switzerland) Servette
Brynhildsen 7'; Omoijuanfo 32'; Eikrem 59'	Report

Aker Stadion, Molde
Attendance: 1,925
Referee: Duje Strukan (Croatia)
29 July 2021
20:30

Servette (Switzerland)	2–0	(Norway) Molde
Diallo 18'; Kyei 59'	Report

Stade de Genève, Geneva
Attendance: 3,842
Referee: Jochem Kamphuis (Netherlands)

Molde won 3–2 on aggregate.

22 July 2021
21:00

Újpest (Hungary)	2–1	(Liechtenstein) Vaduz
Z. Stieber 7'; Tallo 64'	Report	Cicek 81'

Szusza Ferenc Stadion, Budapest
Attendance: 0
Referee: Denys Shurman (Ukraine)
29 July 2021
18:00

Vaduz (Liechtenstein)	1–3	(Hungary) Újpest
Dobras 7'	Report	Tallo 28' (pen.); Beridze 47'; Onovo 85'

Sportpark, Eschen
Attendance: 0
Referee: Christian-Petru Ciochirca (Austria)

Újpest won 5–2 on aggregate.

22 July 2021
19:00 (20:00 UTC+3)

Sūduva (Lithuania)	0–0	(Poland) Raków Częstochowa
	Report

Sūduva Stadium, Marijampolė
Attendance: 1,200
Referee: Ioannis Papadopoulos (Greece)
29 July 2021
19:00

Raków Częstochowa (Poland)	0–0 (a.e.t.)	(Lithuania) Sūduva
	Report
Penalties
Ivi (penalty scored); Arak (penalty scored); Tudor (penalty scored); Poletanović (penalty scored)	4–3	(penalty scored) Gorobsov; (penalty scored) Makas; (penalty scored) Auzmendi; (penalty missed) Taravel; (penalty missed) Gargalatzidis

BBOSiR Stadium, Bielsko-Biała (Note: Raków Częstochowa played their home matches at BBOSiR stadium in Bielsko Biała, instead of their regular stadium Miejski Stadion Piłkarski "Raków", Częstochowa, which did not meet UEFA requirements.)
Attendance: 3,917
Referee: Trustin Farrugia Cann (Malta)

0–0 on aggregate; Raków Częstochowa won 4–3 on penalties.

22 July 2021
19:00

Spartak Trnava (Slovakia)	0–0	(Romania) Sepsi OSK
	Report

Anton Malatinský Stadium, Trnava
Attendance: 1,000
Referee: Ivaylo Stoyanov (Bulgaria)
29 July 2021
19:30 (20:30 UTC+3)

Sepsi OSK (Romania)	1–1 (a.e.t.)	(Slovakia) Spartak Trnava
Fofana 29'	Report	Boateng 67'
Penalties
Bojić (penalty scored); Achahbar (penalty missed); Ștefănescu (penalty scored); Tincu (penalty scored); Rep (penalty missed)	3–4	(penalty scored) Procházka; (penalty scored) Savvidis; (penalty scored) Iván; (penalty scored) Ristovski

Municipal Stadium, Sfântu Gheorghe
Attendance: 2,005
Referee: Besfort Kasumi (Kosovo)

1–1 on aggregate; Spartak Trnava won 4–3 on penalties.

22 July 2021
21:00 (19:00 UTC+0)

FH (Iceland)	0–2	(Norway) Rosenborg
	Report	Holse 61'; Islamović 71'

Kaplakriki, Hafnarfjörður
Attendance: 605
Referee: Filip Glova (Slovakia)
29 July 2021
19:00

Rosenborg (Norway)	4–1	(Iceland) FH
Islamović 49' (pen.); Vecchia 54'; E. Ceïde 76', 87'	Report	Þórisson 74'

Lerkendal Stadion, Trondheim
Attendance: 6,662
Referee: Ferenc Karakó (Hungary)

Rosenborg won 6–1 on aggregate.

22 July 2021
19:00

Copenhagen (Denmark)	4–1	(Belarus) Torpedo-BelAZ Zhodino
Falk 43'; Wilczek 47', 62'; Wind 65' (pen.)	Report	Oya 90+2'

Parken Stadium, Copenhagen
Attendance: 8,636
Referee: Dumitri Muntean (Moldova)
29 July 2021
19:00 (20:00 UTC+3)

Torpedo-BelAZ Zhodino (Belarus)	0–5	(Denmark) Copenhagen
	Report	Diks 27'; Bøving 66', 75'; Højlund 68', 90+4'

Central Stadium, Kazan, Russia (Note: Torpedo-BelAZ Zhodino played their home match at Central Stadium, Kazan, Russia, instead of their regular stadium Torpedo Stadium, Zhodino, as in June 2021 UEFA suspended most matches to be played in Belarus, due to European Union sanctions in response to the Ryanair Flight 4978 incident which banned European Union airlines from flying over Belarusian airspace.)
Attendance: 0
Referee: Aleksandrs Anufrijevs (Latvia)

Copenhagen won 9–1 on aggregate.

22 July 2021
17:30 (18:30 UTC+3)

Panevėžys (Lithuania)	0–1	(Serbia) Vojvodina
	Report	Čović 70'

Aukštaitija Stadium, Panevėžys
Attendance: 1,502
Referee: Alain Durieux (Luxembourg)
29 July 2021
20:00

Vojvodina (Serbia)	1–0	(Lithuania) Panevėžys
Kabić 90+6'	Report

Karađorđe Stadium, Novi Sad
Attendance: 2,476
Referee: Juri Frischer (Estonia)

Vojvodina won 2–0 on aggregate.

22 July 2021
21:00

Hajduk Split (Croatia)	2–0	(Kazakhstan) Tobol
Ljubičić 21', 53'	Report

Stadion Poljud, Split
Attendance: 11,141
Referee: Christian Dingert (Germany)
29 July 2021
17:00 (21:00 UTC+6)

Tobol (Kazakhstan)	4–1 (a.e.t.)	(Croatia) Hajduk Split
Jovančić 56'; Sergeyev 61', 67'; Tagybergen 118'	Report	Sahiti 90+4'

Central Stadium, Kostanay
Attendance: 2,000
Referee: Vladimir Moskalev (Russia)

Tobol won 4–3 on aggregate.

22 July 2021
20:45 (19:45 UTC+1)

Aberdeen (Scotland)	5–1	(Sweden) BK Häcken
Considine 28'; Ferguson 44' (pen.), 53'; Ramirez 84'; McLennan 90+3'	Report	Jeremejeff 59'

Pittodrie Stadium, Aberdeen
Attendance: 5,665
Referee: José Luis Munuera (Spain)
29 July 2021
18:30

BK Häcken (Sweden)	2–0	(Scotland) Aberdeen
Olsson 51'; Bengtsson 68' (pen.)	Report

Bravida Arena, Gothenburg
Attendance: 823
Referee: Ádám Farkas (Hungary)

Aberdeen won 5–3 on aggregate.
