= 2021–22 UEFA Europa Conference League qualifying =

2021–22 UEFA Europa Conference League qualifying was the preliminary phase of the 2021–22 UEFA Europa Conference League, prior to the competition proper. Qualification consisted of the qualifying phase (first to third rounds) and the play-off round. It began on 6 July and ended on 26 August 2021.

A total of 163 teams competed in the qualifying system, with 24 teams in Champions Path and 139 teams in Main Path. The 22 winners in the play-off round advanced to the group stage, to join the 10 losers of the Europa League play-off round.

Times are CEST (UTC+2), as listed by UEFA (local times, if different, are in parentheses).

== Teams ==
=== Champions Path ===
The Champions Path included league champions which were eliminated from the Champions Path qualifying phase of the Champions League and the Champions Path qualifying phase of the Europa League, and consisted of the following rounds:

- Second qualifying round (18 teams): 18 teams which entered this round (including 15 losers of the Champions League first qualifying round and 3 losers of the Champions League preliminary qualifying round).
- Third qualifying round (10 teams): 9 winners of the second qualifying round and 1 loser of the Champions League first qualifying round.
- Play-off round (10 teams): 5 teams which entered this round (including 5 losers of the Europa League Champions Path third qualifying round), and 5 winners of the third qualifying round.

Below are the participating teams of the Champions Path (with their 2021 UEFA club coefficients, not to be used as seeding for the Champions Path, however), grouped by their starting rounds.

Key to colours
Winners of play-off round advance to group stage

Play-off round
Team	Coeff.
(Lithuania) Žalgiris	6.500
(Estonia) Flora	6.250
(Kazakhstan) Kairat	6.000
(Gibraltar) Lincoln Red Imps	5.750
(Azerbaijan) Neftçi	5.000

Third qualifying round
Team	Coeff.
(Republic of Ireland) Shamrock Rovers	4.750

Second qualifying round
Team	Coeff.
(North Macedonia) Shkëndija	9.000
(Georgia (country)) Dinamo Tbilisi	6.500
(Montenegro) Budućnost Podgorica	6.000
(Latvia) Riga	5.500
(Northern Ireland) Linfield	5.250
(Luxembourg) Fola Esch	5.250
(Belarus) Shakhtyor Soligorsk	5.250
(Israel) Maccabi Haifa	4.875
(Wales) Connah's Quay Nomads	4.750
(Iceland) Valur	4.250
(Norway) Bodø/Glimt	4.200
(Malta) Hibernians	3.750
(Albania) Teuta	2.750
(Faroe Islands) HB	2.250
(Kosovo) Prishtina	2.250
(Bosnia and Herzegovina) Borac Banja Luka	1.600
(Andorra) Inter Club d'Escaldes	1.500
(San Marino) Folgore	1.000

Notes

1. ^{UEL CH Q3} Losers of Europa League third qualifying round (Champions Path).
2. ^{UCL Q1} Losers of Champions League first qualifying round.
3. ^{UCL PR F} Loser of Champions League preliminary round final.
4. ^{UCL PR SF} Losers of Champions League preliminary round semi-finals.

=== Main Path ===
The Main Path included league non-champions, and consisted of the following rounds:

- First qualifying round (66 teams): 66 teams which entered in this round.
- Second qualifying round (90 teams): 57 teams which entered in this round, and 33 winners of the first qualifying round.
- Third qualifying round (54 teams): 9 teams which entered in this round, and 45 winners of the second qualifying round.
- Play-off round (34 teams): 7 teams which entered this round (including 3 losers of the Europa League Main Path third qualifying round), and 27 winners of the third qualifying round.

Below are the participating teams of the League Path (with their 2021 UEFA club coefficients), grouped by their starting rounds.

Key to colours
Winners of play-off round advance to group stage

Play-off round
Team	Coeff.
(Italy) Roma	90.000
(England) Tottenham Hotspur	88.000
(France) Rennes	19.000
(Germany) Union Berlin	14.714
(Czech Republic) Jablonec	7.000
(Scotland) St Johnstone	6.675
(Cyprus) Anorthosis Famagusta	5.550

Third qualifying round
Team	Coeff.
(Belgium) Anderlecht	25.000
(Austria) LASK	21.000
(Greece) PAOK	20.000
(Portugal) Paços de Ferreira	9.709
(Netherlands) Vitesse	7.840
(Russia) Rubin Kazan	7.676
(Ukraine) Kolos Kovalivka	6.620
(Turkey) Trabzonspor	6.020
(Switzerland) Luzern	5.500

Second qualifying round
Team	Coeff.
(Switzerland) Basel	49.000
(Denmark) Copenhagen	43.500
(Czech Republic) Viktoria Plzeň	33.500
(Belgium) Gent	26.500
(Kazakhstan) Astana	22.500
(Netherlands) Feyenoord	21.000
(Azerbaijan) Qarabağ	21.000
(Romania) FCSB	21.000
(Israel) Maccabi Tel Aviv	20.500
(Greece) AEK Athens	19.500
(Serbia) Partizan	18.000
(Belarus) BATE Borisov	17.500
(Israel) Hapoel Be'er Sheva	17.500
(Norway) Molde	17.000
(Norway) Rosenborg	14.000
(Croatia) Rijeka	13.500
(Cyprus) Apollon Limassol	13.500
Austria Wien	10.000
(Portugal) Santa Clara	9.709
(Bulgaria) CSKA Sofia	8.000
(Croatia) Hajduk Split	8.000
(Luxembourg) F91 Dudelange	8.000
(Russia) Sochi	7.676
(Scotland) Aberdeen	7.500
(Slovenia) Olimpija Ljubljana	6.750
(Scotland) Hibernian	6.675
(Ukraine) Vorskla Poltava	6.620
(Turkey) Sivasspor	6.020
(Croatia) Osijek	6.000
(Romania) Universitatea Craiova	6.000
(Denmark) AGF	5.575
(Cyprus) AEL Limassol	5.550
(Liechtenstein) Vaduz	5.500
(Serbia) Vojvodina	5.350
(Serbia) Čukarički	5.350
(Czech Republic) Slovácko	5.320
(Switzerland) Servette	5.245
(Greece) Aris	5.200
(Belarus) Dynamo Brest	5.000
(Slovakia) DAC Dunajská Streda	5.000
(Israel) Ashdod	4.875
(Norway) Vålerenga	4.200
(Sweden) Hammarby IF	4.100
(Sweden) BK Häcken	4.100
(Sweden) IF Elfsborg	4.100
(Bulgaria) Lokomotiv Plovdiv	4.075
(Bulgaria) Arda	4.075
(Romania) Sepsi OSK	3.640
(Azerbaijan) Keşla	3.375
(Azerbaijan) Sumgayit	3.375
(Kazakhstan) Tobol	3.125
(Kazakhstan) Shakhter Karagandy	3.125
(Hungary) Újpest	3.100
(Belarus) Torpedo-BelAZ Zhodino	3.050
(Poland) Raków Częstochowa	3.025
(Poland) Pogoń Szczecin	3.025
(Lithuania) Panevėžys	1.750

First qualifying round
Team	Coeff.
(Slovenia) Maribor	14.000
(Hungary) MOL Fehérvár	11.500
(Republic of Ireland) Dundalk	10.500
(Lithuania) Sūduva	8.750
(Wales) The New Saints	7.500
(Slovakia) Spartak Trnava	7.500
(Bosnia and Herzegovina) Sarajevo	6.250
(Slovenia) Domžale	5.500
(Faroe Islands) KÍ	5.250
(Finland) KuPS	5.000
(Iceland) FH	5.000
(Montenegro) Sutjeska	4.750
(Andorra) FC Santa Coloma	4.500
(Albania) Partizani	4.250
(Albania) Laçi	4.000
(Gibraltar) Europa	4.000
(Latvia) Liepāja	4.000
(Estonia) FCI Levadia	3.750
(Kosovo) Drita	3.500
(San Marino) La Fiorita	3.250
(Iceland) Stjarnan	3.250
(Hungary) Puskás Akadémia	3.100
(Poland) Śląsk Wrocław	3.025
(North Macedonia) Shkupi	3.000
(Moldova) Petrocub Hîncești	3.000
(Faroe Islands) NSÍ	3.000
(Northern Ireland) Coleraine	2.750
(San Marino) Tre Penne	2.750
(Bosnia and Herzegovina) Široki Brijeg	2.750
(Slovakia) Žilina	2.725
(Wales) Bala Town	2.500
(Malta) Gżira United	2.500
(Iceland) Breiðablik	2.250
(Gibraltar) St Joseph's	2.250
(Moldova) Milsami Orhei	2.250
(Armenia) Urartu	2.250
(Lithuania) Kauno Žalgiris	2.000
(Latvia) RFS	2.000
(Finland) Inter Turku	2.000
(North Macedonia) Sileks	1.750
(Luxembourg) Racing Union	1.650
(Luxembourg) Swift Hesperange	1.650
(Bosnia and Herzegovina) Velež Mostar	1.600
(Republic of Ireland) Bohemians	1.575
(Republic of Ireland) Sligo Rovers	1.575
(North Macedonia) Struga	1.525
(Moldova) Sfîntul Gheorghe	1.500
(Malta) Birkirkara	1.500
(Armenia) Noah	1.475
(Latvia) Valmiera	1.475
(Armenia) Ararat Yerevan	1.475
(Albania) Vllaznia	1.450
(Northern Ireland) Glentoran	1.391
(Northern Ireland) Larne	1.391
(Georgia (country)) Dinamo Batumi	1.375
(Finland) Honka	1.375
(Georgia (country)) Dila Gori	1.375
(Georgia (country)) Gagra	1.375
(Malta) Mosta	1.275
(Andorra) Sant Julià	1.250
(Kosovo) Llapi	1.166
(Gibraltar) Mons Calpe	1.133
(Estonia) Paide Linnameeskond	1.000
(Montenegro) Dečić	1.000
(Montenegro) Podgorica	1.000
(Wales) Newtown	1.000

Notes

1. ^{UEL MP Q3} Losers of Europa League third qualifying round (Main Path).

== Format ==
Each tie is played over two legs, with each team playing one leg at home. The team that scores more goals on aggregate over the two legs advance to the next round. If the aggregate score is level at the end of normal time of the second leg, the away goals rule is no longer applied starting from this season. To decide the winner of the tie, extra time is played, and if the same number of goals are scored by both teams during extra time, the tie is decided by a penalty shoot-out.

== Schedule ==
The schedule of the competition was as follows (all draws were held at the UEFA headquarters in Nyon, Switzerland).

Schedule for the qualifying phase of the 2021–22 UEFA Europa Conference League
Round	Draw date	First leg	Second leg
First qualifying round	15 June 2021	8 July 2021	15 July 2021
Second qualifying round	16 June 2021	22 July 2021	29 July 2021
Third qualifying round	19 July 2021	5 August 2021	12 August 2021
Play-offs	2 August 2021	19 August 2021	26 August 2021

== First qualifying round ==
The draw for the first qualifying round was held on 15 June 2021, 13:30 CEST.

=== Seeding ===
A total of 66 teams played in the first qualifying round. Seeding of teams was based on their 2021 UEFA club coefficients. Teams from the same association could not be drawn against each other. Prior to the draw, UEFA formed eight groups, seven of four seeded teams and four unseeded teams, and one of five seeded teams and five unseeded teams, in accordance with the principles set by the Club Competitions Committee. Numbers were pre-assigned for each team by UEFA, with the draw held in two runs, one for Groups 1–7 with eight teams and one for Group 8 with ten teams. The first team drawn in each tie would be the home team of the first leg.

Group 1		Group 2		Group 3		Group 4	
Seeded	Unseeded	Seeded	Unseeded	Seeded	Unseeded	Seeded	Unseeded
(Lithuania) Sūduva (4); (Estonia) FCI Levadia (1); (Kosovo) Drita (3); (Hungary) Puskás Akadémia (2)	(Gibraltar) St Joseph's (7); (Finland) Inter Turku (6); (Latvia) Valmiera (8); (Montenegro) Dečić (5)	(Slovenia) Domžale (4); (Andorra) FC Santa Coloma (2); (San Marino) La Fiorita (1); (Northern Ireland) Coleraine (3)	(Luxembourg) Swift Hesperange (8); (Bosnia and Herzegovina) Velež Mostar (5); (Malta) Birkirkara (7); (Gibraltar) Mons Calpe (6)	(Slovenia) Maribor (4); (Albania) Partizani (3); (North Macedonia) Shkupi (1); (San Marino) Tre Penne (2)	(Armenia) Urartu (8); (Moldova) Sfîntul Gheorghe (5); (Georgia (country)) Dinamo Batumi (6); (Kosovo) Llapi (7)	(Bosnia and Herzegovina) Sarajevo (2); (Finland) KuPS (3); (Albania) Laçi (1); (Slovakia) Žilina (4)	(Moldova) Milsami Orhei (6); (Armenia) Noah (5); (Georgia (country)) Dila Gori (8); (Montenegro) Podgorica (7)
Group 5		Group 6		Group 7		Group 8	
Seeded	Unseeded	Seeded	Unseeded	Seeded	Unseeded	Seeded	Unseeded
(Faroe Islands) KÍ (3); (Iceland) FH (1); (Poland) Śląsk Wrocław (2); (Wales) Bala Town (4)	(Latvia) RFS (5); (Republic of Ireland) Sligo Rovers (7); (Northern Ireland) Larne (8); (Estonia) Paide Linnameeskond (6)	(Hungary) MOL Fehérvár (1); (Montenegro) Sutjeska (2); (Moldova) Petrocub Hîncești (3); (Bosnia and Herzegovina) Široki Brijeg (4)	(North Macedonia) Sileks (5); (Armenia) Ararat Yerevan (7); (Albania) Vllaznia (8); (Georgia (country)) Gagra (6)	(Wales) The New Saints (2); (Gibraltar) Europa (4); (Iceland) Stjarnan (1); (Malta) Gżira United (3)	(Lithuania) Kauno Žalgiris (8); (Republic of Ireland) Bohemians (7); (Northern Ireland) Glentoran (6); (Andorra) Sant Julià (5)	(Republic of Ireland) Dundalk (4); (Slovakia) Spartak Trnava (3); (Latvia) Liepāja (2); (Faroe Islands) NSÍ (1); (Iceland) Breiðablik (5)	(Luxembourg) Racing Union (9); (North Macedonia) Struga (10); (Finland) Honka (6); (Malta) Mosta (8); (Wales) Newtown (7)

=== Summary ===
The first legs were played on 6 and 8 July, and the second legs were played on 13 and 15 July 2021.

The winners of the ties advanced to the Main Path second qualifying round. The losers were eliminated from European competitions for the season.

Team 1	Agg.	Team 2	1st leg	2nd leg
FCI Levadia (Estonia)	4–2	(Gibraltar) St Joseph's	3–1	1–1
Inter Turku (Finland)	1–3	(Hungary) Puskás Akadémia	1–1	0–2
Drita (Kosovo)	3–1 (Note: Order of legs reversed after original draw.)	(Montenegro) Dečić	2–1	1–0
Sūduva (Lithuania)	2–1	(Latvia) Valmiera	2–1	0–0
Birkirkara (Malta)	2–1	(San Marino) La Fiorita	1–0	1–1
Mons Calpe (Gibraltar)	1–5	(Andorra) FC Santa Coloma	1–1	0–4
Velež Mostar (Bosnia and Herzegovina)	4–2	(Northern Ireland) Coleraine	2–1	2–1
Domžale (Slovenia)	2–1	(Luxembourg) Swift Hesperange	1–0	1–1
Shkupi (North Macedonia)	3–1	(Kosovo) Llapi	2–0	1–1
Tre Penne (San Marino)	0–7	(Georgia (country)) Dinamo Batumi	0–4	0–3
Partizani (Albania)	8–4	(Moldova) Sfîntul Gheorghe	5–2	3–2
Maribor (Slovenia)	2–0	(Armenia) Urartu	1–0	1–0
Podgorica (Montenegro)	1–3	(Albania) Laçi	1–0	0–3 (a.e.t.)
Milsami Orhei (Moldova)	1–0	(Bosnia and Herzegovina) Sarajevo	0–0	1–0
Noah (Armenia)	1–5	(Finland) KuPS	1–0	0–5
Žilina (Slovakia)	6–3	(Georgia (country)) Dila Gori	5–1	1–2
FH (Iceland)	3–1	(Republic of Ireland) Sligo Rovers	1–0	2–1
Paide Linnameeskond (Estonia)	1–4	(Poland) Śląsk Wrocław	1–2	0–2
RFS (Latvia)	6–5	(Faroe Islands) KÍ	2–3	4–2 (a.e.t.)
Bala Town (Wales)	0–2	(Northern Ireland) Larne	0–1	0–1
MOL Fehérvár (Hungary)	1–3	(Armenia) Ararat Yerevan	1–1	0–2
Sutjeska (Montenegro)	2–1	(Georgia (country)) Gagra	1–0	1–1
Sileks (North Macedonia)	1–2	(Moldova) Petrocub Hîncești	1–1	0–1
Široki Brijeg (Bosnia and Herzegovina)	3–4	(Albania) Vllaznia	3–1	0–3
Stjarnan (Iceland)	1–4	(Republic of Ireland) Bohemians	1–1	0–3
Glentoran (Northern Ireland)	1–3	(Wales) The New Saints	1–1	0–2
Sant Julià (Andorra)	1–1 (3–5 p)	(Malta) Gżira United	0–0	1–1 (a.e.t.)
Europa (Gibraltar)	0–2	(Lithuania) Kauno Žalgiris	0–0	0–2
Dundalk (Republic of Ireland)	5–0	(Wales) Newtown	4–0	1–0
Mosta (Malta)	3–4	(Slovakia) Spartak Trnava	3–2	0–2
Liepāja (Latvia)	5–2	(North Macedonia) Struga	1–1	4–1
Racing Union (Luxembourg)	2–5	(Iceland) Breiðablik	2–3	0–2
Honka (Finland)	3–1	(Faroe Islands) NSÍ	0–0	3–1

== Second qualifying round ==
The draw for the second qualifying round was held on 16 June 2021, 13:30 CEST.

=== Seeding ===
A total of 108 teams played in the second qualifying round. They were divided into two paths:

- Champions Path (18 teams): The teams, whose identity was not known at the time of draw, were seeded as following:
  - Seeded: 15 of the 16 losers of the 2021–22 UEFA Champions League first qualifying round (1 of the teams received a bye to the third qualifying round).
  - Unseeded: 3 losers of the 2021–22 UEFA Champions League preliminary round.
- Main Path (90 teams): 57 teams which entered in this round, and 33 winners of the first qualifying round. Seeding of teams was based on their 2021 UEFA club coefficients. For the winner of the first qualifying round, whose identity was not known at the time of draw, the club coefficient of the highest-ranked remaining team in each tie was used. Teams from the same association could not be drawn against each other.

Prior to the draw, UEFA formed three groups in the Champions Path of five seeded teams and one unseeded team, and nine groups in the Main Path of five seeded teams and five unseeded teams, in accordance with the principles set by the Club Competitions Committee. In each group of the Champions Path, firstly, a seeded team was drawn against the only unseeded team, and then, the remaining four seeded teams were drawn against each other. In the Main Path, numbers were pre-assigned for each team by UEFA, with the draw held in one run for Groups 1–9 with ten teams. The first team drawn in each tie would be the home team of the first leg.

Champions Path
Group 1		Group 2		Group 3	
Seeded	Unseeded	Seeded	Unseeded	Seeded	Unseeded
(Latvia) Riga; (Albania) Teuta; (North Macedonia) Shkëndija; (Georgia (country)) Dinamo Tbilisi; (Israel) Maccabi Haifa	(Andorra) Inter Club d'Escaldes	(Belarus) Shakhtyor Soligorsk; (Bosnia and Herzegovina) Borac Banja Luka; (Northern Ireland) Linfield; (Montenegro) Budućnost Podgorica; (Luxembourg) Fola Esch	(Faroe Islands) HB	(Iceland) Valur; (Norway) Bodø/Glimt; (Kosovo) Prishtina; (Wales) Connah's Quay Nomads; (Malta) Hibernians	(San Marino) Folgore

Main Path
Group 1		Group 2		Group 3	
Seeded	Unseeded	Seeded	Unseeded	Seeded	Unseeded
(Romania) FCSB (4); (Israel) Hapoel Be'er Sheva (2); (Cyprus) Apollon Limassol (1); (Ukraine) Vorskla Poltava (5); (Serbia) Čukarički (3)	(Finland) KuPS (6); (Bulgaria) Arda (10); (Azerbaijan) Sumgayit (8); (Kazakhstan) Shakhter Karagandy (9); (Slovakia) Žilina (7)	(Kazakhstan) Astana (4); (Israel) Maccabi Tel Aviv (5); (Russia) Sochi (3); (Turkey) Sivasspor (2); (Cyprus) AEL Limassol (1)	(Greece) Aris (9); (Montenegro) Sutjeska (6); (Azerbaijan) Keşla (8); (Moldova) Petrocub Hîncești (10); (Albania) Vllaznia (7)	(Serbia) Partizan (1); (Belarus) BATE Borisov (2); (Republic of Ireland) Dundalk (3); (Moldova) Milsami Orhei (5); (Latvia) RFS (4)	(Slovakia) DAC Dunajská Streda (7); (Sweden) IF Elfsborg (6); (Estonia) FCI Levadia (8); (Hungary) Puskás Akadémia (9); (Georgia (country)) Dinamo Batumi (10)
Group 4		Group 5		Group 6	
Seeded	Unseeded	Seeded	Unseeded	Seeded	Unseeded
(Czech Republic) Viktoria Plzeň (4); (Croatia) Rijeka (5); (Bulgaria) CSKA Sofia (3); (Wales) The New Saints (2); (Slovenia) Domžale (1)	(Belarus) Dynamo Brest (9); (Lithuania) Kauno Žalgiris (10); (Latvia) Liepāja (8); (Finland) Honka (7); (Malta) Gżira United (6)	(Belgium) Gent (1); (Portugal) Santa Clara (5); (Luxembourg) F91 Dudelange (3); (Scotland) Hibernian (4); (Denmark) AGF (2)	(Andorra) FC Santa Coloma (9); (Norway) Vålerenga (7); (Republic of Ireland) Bohemians (8); (North Macedonia) Shkupi (6); (Northern Ireland) Larne (10)	(Azerbaijan) Qarabağ (4); (Greece) AEK Athens (5); (Armenia) Ararat Yerevan (1); (Romania) Universitatea Craiova (3); (Czech Republic) Slovácko (2)	(Israel) Ashdod (9); (Bulgaria) Lokomotiv Plovdiv (10); (Albania) Laçi (8); (Poland) Śląsk Wrocław (7); (Bosnia and Herzegovina) Velež Mostar (6)
Group 7		Group 8		Group 9	
Seeded	Unseeded	Seeded	Unseeded	Seeded	Unseeded
(Switzerland) Basel (4); (Netherlands) Feyenoord (5); Austria Wien (1); (Slovenia) Olimpija Ljubljana (3); (Croatia) Osijek (2)	(Albania) Partizani (9); (Kosovo) Drita (6); (Malta) Birkirkara (8); (Poland) Pogoń Szczecin (10); (Iceland) Breiðablik (7)	(Norway) Molde (4); (Slovenia) Maribor (5); (Lithuania) Sūduva (1); (Slovakia) Spartak Trnava (3); (Liechtenstein) Vaduz (2)	(Switzerland) Servette (9); (Sweden) Hammarby IF (6); (Romania) Sepsi OSK (8); (Hungary) Újpest (10); (Poland) Raków Częstochowa (7)	(Denmark) Copenhagen (4); (Norway) Rosenborg (5); (Croatia) Hajduk Split (1); (Scotland) Aberdeen (3); (Serbia) Vojvodina (2)	(Iceland) FH (6); (Sweden) BK Häcken (8); (Kazakhstan) Tobol (7); (Belarus) Torpedo-BelAZ Zhodino (9); (Lithuania) Panevėžys (10)

Notes

1. ^{†} Winner of the first qualifying round, whose identity was not known at the time of draw. Teams in italics defeated a team with a higher coefficient, thus effectively taking the coefficient of their opponent in the draw.

=== Summary ===
The first legs were played on 20, 21 and 22 July, and the second legs were played on 27 and 29 July 2021.

The winners of the ties advanced to the third qualifying round of their respective path. The losers were eliminated from European competitions for the season.

Team 1	Agg.	Team 2	1st leg	2nd leg
Champions Path
Shamrock Rovers (Republic of Ireland)	Bye	N/A	—	—
Teuta (Albania)	3–2	(Andorra) Inter Club d'Escaldes	0–2	3–0 (a.e.t.)
Riga (Latvia)	3–0	(North Macedonia) Shkëndija	2–0	1–0
Dinamo Tbilisi (Georgia (country))	2–7	(Israel) Maccabi Haifa	1–2	1–5
HB (Faroe Islands)	6–0 (Note: Order of legs reversed after original draw.)	(Montenegro) Budućnost Podgorica	4–0	2–0
Linfield (Northern Ireland)	4–0	(Bosnia and Herzegovina) Borac Banja Luka	4–0	0–0
Shakhtyor Soligorsk (Belarus)	1–3	(Luxembourg) Fola Esch	1–2	0–1
Folgore (San Marino)	3–7	(Malta) Hibernians	1–3	2–4
Prishtina (Kosovo)	6–5	(Wales) Connah's Quay Nomads	4–1	2–4
Valur (Iceland)	0–6	(Norway) Bodø/Glimt	0–3	0–3
Main Path
KuPS (Finland)	5–4	(Ukraine) Vorskla Poltava	2–2	3–2 (a.e.t.)
FCSB (Romania)	2–2 (3–5 p)	(Kazakhstan) Shakhter Karagandy	1–0	1–2 (a.e.t.)
Arda (Bulgaria)	0–6	(Israel) Hapoel Be'er Sheva	0–2	0–4
Apollon Limassol (Cyprus)	3–5	(Slovakia) Žilina	1–3	2–2
Čukarički (Serbia)	2–0	(Azerbaijan) Sumgayit	0–0	2–0
Sutjeska (Montenegro)	1–3	(Israel) Maccabi Tel Aviv	0–0	1–3
Astana (Kazakhstan)	3–2	(Greece) Aris	2–0	1–2 (a.e.t.)
Petrocub Hîncești (Moldova)	0–2	(Turkey) Sivasspor	0–1	0–1
AEL Limassol (Cyprus)	2–0	(Albania) Vllaznia	1–0	1–0
Sochi (Russia)	7–2	(Azerbaijan) Keşla	3–0	4–2
IF Elfsborg (Sweden)	9–0	(Moldova) Milsami Orhei	4–0	5–0
RFS (Latvia)	5–0	(Hungary) Puskás Akadémia	3–0	2–0
Dinamo Batumi (Georgia (country))	4–2	(Belarus) BATE Borisov	0–1	4–1
Partizan (Serbia)	3–0	(Slovakia) DAC Dunajská Streda	1–0	2–0
Dundalk (Republic of Ireland)	4–3	(Estonia) FCI Levadia	2–2	2–1
Gżira United (Malta)	0–3	(Croatia) Rijeka	0–2	0–1
Viktoria Plzeň (Czech Republic)	4–2	(Belarus) Dynamo Brest	2–1	2–1
Kauno Žalgiris (Lithuania)	1–10	(Wales) The New Saints	0–5	1–5
Domžale (Slovenia)	2–1	(Finland) Honka	1–1	1–0
CSKA Sofia (Bulgaria)	0–0 (3–1 p)	(Latvia) Liepāja	0–0	0–0 (a.e.t.)
Shkupi (North Macedonia)	0–5	(Portugal) Santa Clara	0–3	0–2
Hibernian (Scotland)	5–1	(Andorra) FC Santa Coloma	3–0	2–1
Larne (Northern Ireland)	3–2	(Denmark) AGF	2–1	1–1
Gent (Belgium)	4–2	(Norway) Vålerenga	4–0	0–2
F91 Dudelange (Luxembourg)	0–4	(Republic of Ireland) Bohemians	0–1	0–3
Velež Mostar (Bosnia and Herzegovina)	2–2 (3–2 p)	(Greece) AEK Athens	2–1	0–1 (a.e.t.)
Qarabağ (Azerbaijan)	1–0	(Israel) Ashdod	0–0	1–0
Lokomotiv Plovdiv (Bulgaria)	1–1 (3–2 p)	(Czech Republic) Slovácko	1–0	0–1 (a.e.t.)
Ararat Yerevan (Armenia)	5–7	(Poland) Śląsk Wrocław	2–4	3–3
Laçi (Albania)	1–0	(Romania) Universitatea Craiova	1–0	0–0
Drita (Kosovo)	2–3	(Netherlands) Feyenoord	0–0	2–3
Basel (Switzerland)	5–0	(Albania) Partizani	3–0	2–0
Pogoń Szczecin (Poland)	0–1	(Croatia) Osijek	0–0	0–1
Austria Wien	2–3	(Iceland) Breiðablik	1–1	1–2
Olimpija Ljubljana (Slovenia)	1–1 (5–4 p)	(Malta) Birkirkara	1–0	0–1 (a.e.t.)
Hammarby IF (Sweden)	4–1	(Slovenia) Maribor	3–1	1–0
Molde (Norway)	3–2	(Switzerland) Servette	3–0	0–2
Újpest (Hungary)	5–2	(Liechtenstein) Vaduz	2–1	3–1
Sūduva (Lithuania)	0–0 (3–4 p)	(Poland) Raków Częstochowa	0–0	0–0 (a.e.t.)
Spartak Trnava (Slovakia)	1–1 (4–3 p)	(Romania) Sepsi OSK	0–0	1–1 (a.e.t.)
FH (Iceland)	1–6	(Norway) Rosenborg	0–2	1–4
Copenhagen (Denmark)	9–1	(Belarus) Torpedo-BelAZ Zhodino	4–1	5–0
Panevėžys (Lithuania)	0–2	(Serbia) Vojvodina	0–1	0–1
Hajduk Split (Croatia)	3–4	(Kazakhstan) Tobol	2–0	1–4 (a.e.t.)
Aberdeen (Scotland)	5–3	(Sweden) BK Häcken	5–1	0–2

== Third qualifying round ==
The draw for the third qualifying round was held on 19 July 2021, 14:00 CEST.

=== Seeding ===
A total of 64 teams played in the third qualifying round. They were divided into two paths:

- Champions Path (10 teams): 9 winners of the second qualifying round (Champions Path), whose identity was not known at the time of draw, and 1 loser from the first qualifying round of the Champions League which received a bye to this round (Shamrock Rovers). There was no seeding. Due to political reasons, teams from Bosnia Herzegovina and Kosovo could not be drawn against each other, thus the winners of the ties between Borac Banja Luka/Linfield and Prishtina/Connah's Quay Nomads could not be drawn against each other.
- Main Path (54 teams): 9 teams which entered in this round, and 45 winners of the second qualifying round (Main Path). Seeding of teams was based on their 2021 UEFA club coefficients. For the winners of the second qualifying round, whose identity was not known at the time of draw, the club coefficient of the highest-ranked remaining team in each tie was used. Teams from the same association could not be drawn against each other.

Prior to the draw, UEFA formed seven groups in the Main Path, six of four seeded teams and four unseeded teams, and one of three seeded teams and three unseeded teams, in accordance with the principles set by the Club Competitions Committee. In the Main Path, numbers were pre-assigned for each team by UEFA, with the draw held in two runs, one for Groups 1–6 with eight teams and one for Group 7 with six teams. The first team drawn in each tie would be the home team of the first leg.

Champions Path
- (Latvia) Riga
- (Israel) Maccabi Haifa
- (Faroe Islands) HB
- (Northern Ireland) Linfield
- (Luxembourg) Fola Esch
- (Republic of Ireland) Shamrock Rovers
- (Kosovo) Prishtina
- (Norway) Bodø/Glimt
- (Malta) Hibernians
- (Albania) Teuta

Main Path
Group 1		Group 2		Group 3		Group 4	
Seeded	Unseeded	Seeded	Unseeded	Seeded	Unseeded	Seeded	Unseeded
(Kazakhstan) Astana (4); (Serbia) Partizan (3); (Israel) Hapoel Be'er Sheva (1); (Georgia (country)) Dinamo Batumi (2)	(Russia) Sochi (5); (Finland) KuPS (6); (Turkey) Sivasspor (7); (Poland) Śląsk Wrocław (8)	(Switzerland) Basel (4); (Kazakhstan) Shakhter Karagandy (1); (Bosnia and Herzegovina) Velež Mostar (3); (Portugal) Santa Clara (2)	(Slovenia) Olimpija Ljubljana (7); (Ukraine) Kolos Kovalivka (8); (Hungary) Újpest (6); (Sweden) IF Elfsborg (5)	(Belgium) Gent (3); (Netherlands) Feyenoord (4); (Croatia) Rijeka (1); (Portugal) Paços de Ferreira (2)	(Scotland) Hibernian (8); (Northern Ireland) Larne (7); (Switzerland) Luzern (6); (Latvia) RFS (5)	(Czech Republic) Viktoria Plzeň (1); (Greece) PAOK (3); (Norway) Molde (4); (Iceland) Breiðablik (2)	(Republic of Ireland) Bohemians (5); (Scotland) Aberdeen (7); (Wales) The New Saints (8); (Turkey) Trabzonspor (6)
Group 5		Group 6		Group 7			
Seeded	Unseeded	Seeded	Unseeded	Seeded	Unseeded		
(Denmark) Copenhagen (4); (Sweden) Hammarby IF (3); (Slovakia) Žilina (1); (Poland) Raków Częstochowa (2)	(Kazakhstan) Tobol (8); (Russia) Rubin Kazan (7); (Serbia) Čukarički (5); (Bulgaria) Lokomotiv Plovdiv (6)	(Austria) LASK (4); (Azerbaijan) Qarabağ (3); (Israel) Maccabi Tel Aviv (1); (Bulgaria) CSKA Sofia (2)	(Slovakia) Spartak Trnava (8); (Croatia) Osijek (7); (Cyprus) AEL Limassol (5); (Serbia) Vojvodina (6)	(Belgium) Anderlecht (3); (Norway) Rosenborg (2); (Republic of Ireland) Dundalk (1)	(Netherlands) Vitesse (4); (Albania) Laçi (6); (Slovenia) Domžale (5)		

Notes

1. ^{†} Winner of the second qualifying round, whose identity was not known at the time of draw. Teams in italics defeated a team with a higher coefficient, thus effectively taking the coefficient of their opponent in the draw.

=== Summary ===
The first legs were played on 3 and 5 August, and the second legs were played on 10 and 12 August 2021.

The winners of the ties advanced to the play-off round of their respective path. The losers were eliminated from European competitions for the season.

Team 1	Agg.	Team 2	1st leg	2nd leg
Champions Path
Maccabi Haifa (Israel)	7–3	(Faroe Islands) HB	7–2	0–1
Linfield (Northern Ireland)	2–4	(Luxembourg) Fola Esch	1–2	1–2
Shamrock Rovers (Republic of Ireland)	3–0	(Albania) Teuta	1–0	2–0
Riga (Latvia)	4–2	(Malta) Hibernians	0–1	4–1 (a.e.t.)
Prishtina (Kosovo)	2–3	(Norway) Bodø/Glimt	2–1	0–2
Main Path
Dinamo Batumi (Georgia (country))	2–3	(Turkey) Sivasspor	1–2	1–1 (a.e.t.)
KuPS (Finland)	5–4	(Kazakhstan) Astana	1–1	4–3
Sochi (Russia)	3–3 (2–4 p)	(Serbia) Partizan	1–1	2–2 (a.e.t.)
Śląsk Wrocław (Poland)	2–5	(Israel) Hapoel Be'er Sheva	2–1	0–4
Santa Clara (Portugal)	3–0	(Slovenia) Olimpija Ljubljana	2–0	1–0
Újpest (Hungary)	1–6	(Switzerland) Basel	1–2	0–4
IF Elfsborg (Sweden)	5–2	(Bosnia and Herzegovina) Velež Mostar	1–1	4–1
Kolos Kovalivka (Ukraine)	0–0 (1–3 p)	(Kazakhstan) Shakhter Karagandy	0–0	0–0 (a.e.t.)
Paços de Ferreira (Portugal)	4–1	(Northern Ireland) Larne	4–0	0–1
Luzern (Switzerland)	0–6	(Netherlands) Feyenoord	0–3	0–3
Gent (Belgium)	3–2	(Latvia) RFS	2–2	1–0
Hibernian (Scotland)	2–5	(Croatia) Rijeka	1–1	1–4
Breiðablik (Iceland)	3–5	(Scotland) Aberdeen	2–3	1–2
Trabzonspor (Turkey)	4–4 (4–3 p)	(Norway) Molde	3–3	1–1 (a.e.t.)
Bohemians (Republic of Ireland)	2–3	(Greece) PAOK	2–1	0–2
The New Saints (Wales)	5–5 (1–4 p)	(Czech Republic) Viktoria Plzeň	4–2	1–3 (a.e.t.)
Raków Częstochowa (Poland)	1–0	(Russia) Rubin Kazan	0–0	1–0 (a.e.t.)
Lokomotiv Plovdiv (Bulgaria)	3–5	(Denmark) Copenhagen	1–1	2–4
Čukarički (Serbia)	4–6	(Sweden) Hammarby IF	3–1	1–5
Tobol (Kazakhstan)	0–6	(Slovakia) Žilina	0–1	0–5
CSKA Sofia (Bulgaria)	5–3	(Croatia) Osijek	4–2	1–1
Vojvodina (Serbia)	1–7	(Austria) LASK	0–1	1–6
AEL Limassol (Cyprus)	1–2	(Azerbaijan) Qarabağ	1–1	0–1
Spartak Trnava (Slovakia)	0–1	(Israel) Maccabi Tel Aviv	0–0	0–1
Rosenborg (Norway)	8–2	(Slovenia) Domžale	6–1	2–1
Laçi (Albania)	1–5	(Belgium) Anderlecht	0–3	1–2
Vitesse (Netherlands)	4–3	(Republic of Ireland) Dundalk	2–2	2–1

== Play-off round ==
The draw for the play-off round was held on 2 August 2021, 14:00 CEST.

=== Seeding ===
A total of 44 teams played in the play-off round. They were divided into two paths:

- Champions Path (10 teams): The teams, whose identity was not known at the time of draw, were seeded as following:
  - Seeded: 5 losers of the 2021–22 UEFA Europa League third qualifying round (Champions Path).
  - Unseeded: 5 winners of the third qualifying round (Champions Path).
- Main Path (34 teams): 4 teams which entered in this round, 27 winners of the third qualifying round (Main Path), and 3 losers of the 2021–22 UEFA Europa League third qualifying round (Main Path). Seeding of teams was based on their 2021 UEFA club coefficients. For the winners of the third qualifying round and losers of the Europa League third qualifying round, whose identity was not known at the time of draw, the club coefficient of the highest-ranked remaining team in each tie was used. Teams from the same association could not be drawn against each other.

Prior to the draw, UEFA formed four groups in the Main Path, three of four seeded teams and four unseeded teams, and one of five seeded teams and five unseeded teams, in accordance with the principles set by the Club Competitions Committee. In the Main Path, numbers were pre-assigned for each team by UEFA, with the draw held in two runs, one for Groups 1–3 with eight teams and one for Group 4 with ten teams. The first team drawn in each tie would be the home team of the first leg.

Champions Path
Seeded	Unseeded
(Gibraltar) Lincoln Red Imps; (Lithuania) Žalgiris; (Kazakhstan) Kairat; (Estonia) Flora; (Azerbaijan) Neftçi	(Latvia) Riga; (Luxembourg) Fola Esch; (Israel) Maccabi Haifa; (Republic of Ireland) Shamrock Rovers; (Norway) Bodø/Glimt

Main Path
Group 1		Group 2	
Seeded	Unseeded	Seeded	Unseeded
(England) Tottenham Hotspur (4); (Switzerland) Basel (1); (Czech Republic) Viktoria Plzeň (3); (Azerbaijan) Qarabağ (2)	(Portugal) Paços de Ferreira (6); (Bulgaria) CSKA Sofia (5); (Scotland) Aberdeen (7); (Sweden) Hammarby IF (8)	(Belgium) Anderlecht (1); (Austria) LASK (3); (Israel) Maccabi Tel Aviv (4); (France) Rennes (2)	(Scotland) St Johnstone (5); (Norway) Rosenborg (7); (Netherlands) Vitesse (8); (Kazakhstan) Shakhter Karagandy (6)
Group 3		Group 4	
Seeded	Unseeded	Seeded	Unseeded
(Belgium) Gent (4); (Finland) KuPS (1); (Netherlands) Feyenoord (3); (Greece) PAOK (2)	(Germany) Union Berlin (8); (Croatia) Rijeka (7); (Poland) Raków Częstochowa (6); (Sweden) IF Elfsborg (5)	(Italy) Roma (4); (Denmark) Copenhagen (3); (Czech Republic) Jablonec (1); (Serbia) Partizan (2); (Israel) Hapoel Be'er Sheva (5)	(Turkey) Trabzonspor (10); (Cyprus) Anorthosis Famagusta (6); (Portugal) Santa Clara (8); (Turkey) Sivasspor (9); (Slovakia) Žilina (7)

Notes

1. ^{†} Winners of the third qualifying round (Main Path). Teams in italics defeated a team with a higher coefficient, thus effectively taking the coefficient of their opponent in the draw.
2. ^{‡} Losers of the Europe League third qualifying round (Main Path). Teams in italics lost to a team with a higher coefficient, thus effectively taking the coefficient of their opponent in the draw.

=== Summary ===
The first legs were played on 19 August, and the second legs were played on 26 August 2021.

The winners of the ties advanced to the group stage. The losers were eliminated from European competitions for the season.

Team 1	Agg.	Team 2	1st leg	2nd leg
Champions Path
Žalgiris (Lithuania)	2–3	(Norway) Bodø/Glimt	2–2	0–1
Neftçi (Azerbaijan)	3–7	(Israel) Maccabi Haifa	3–3	0–4
Flora (Estonia)	5–2	(Republic of Ireland) Shamrock Rovers	4–2	1–0
Riga (Latvia)	2–4	(Gibraltar) Lincoln Red Imps	1–1	1–3 (a.e.t.)
Fola Esch (Luxembourg)	2–7	(Kazakhstan) Kairat	1–4	1–3
Main Path
Qarabağ (Azerbaijan)	4–1	(Scotland) Aberdeen	1–0	3–1
Basel (Switzerland)	4–4 (4–3 p)	(Sweden) Hammarby IF	3–1	1–3 (a.e.t.)
Viktoria Plzeň (Czech Republic)	2–3	(Bulgaria) CSKA Sofia	2–0	0–3 (a.e.t.)
Paços de Ferreira (Portugal)	1–3	(England) Tottenham Hotspur	1–0	0–3
Rennes (France)	5–1	(Norway) Rosenborg	2–0	3–1
Anderlecht (Belgium)	4–5	(Netherlands) Vitesse	3–3	1–2
LASK (Austria)	3–1	(Scotland) St Johnstone	1–1	2–0
Shakhter Karagandy (Kazakhstan)	1–4	(Israel) Maccabi Tel Aviv	1–2	0–2
PAOK (Greece)	3–1	(Croatia) Rijeka	1–1	2–0
KuPS (Finland)	0–4	(Germany) Union Berlin	0–4	0–0
Feyenoord (Netherlands)	6–3	(Sweden) IF Elfsborg	5–0	1–3
Raków Częstochowa (Poland)	1–3	(Belgium) Gent	1–0	0–3
Sivasspor (Turkey)	1–7	(Denmark) Copenhagen	1–2	0–5
Santa Clara (Portugal)	2–3	(Serbia) Partizan	2–1	0–2
Trabzonspor (Turkey)	1–5	(Italy) Roma	1–2	0–3
Hapoel Be'er Sheva (Israel)	1–3	(Cyprus) Anorthosis Famagusta	0–0	1–3
Jablonec (Czech Republic)	8–1	(Slovakia) Žilina	5–1	3–0
