= Alexandros Gargalatzidis =

Greek footballer

Personal information
- Date of birth: 12 April 2000 (age 26)
- Place of birth: Thessaloniki, Greece
- Height: 1.81 m (5 ft 11 in)
- Position: Forward

Youth career
- 2011–2019: PAOK

Senior career*
Years	Team	Apps	(Gls)
2017–2020	PAOK	0	(0)
2019–2020	→ Xanthi (loan)	5	(0)
2020–2022	OFI	9	(0)
2021	→ Sūduva (loan)	14	(2)
2022	→ Olympiacos Volos (loan)	12	(0)
2022	Proodeftiki	5	(0)

International career^{‡}
2016	Greece U16	4	(1)
2015–2017	Greece U17	14	(4)
2018	Greece U18	4	(1)
2018–2019	Greece U19	7	(1)
2020	Greece U21	1	(0)
- * Club domestic league appearances and goals as of 13 August 2023 ‡ National team caps and goals as of 8 October 2020

Alexandros Gargalatzidis (Greek: Αλέξανδρος Γκαργκαλατζίδης; born 12 April 2000) is a Greek professional footballer who plays as a forward for Super League 2 club Proodeftiki.

== Career ==
The former OFI striker, Alexandros Gargalatzidis, became the first Greek to score in the newly formed Europa Conference League, as in last minute he scored against Valmiera FC. On 2 July 2021, he also scored in his A Lyga' s debut with his club against FK Banga Gargždai with a goal in 89 '.
