= Daniel Johansen (footballer) =

Faroese footballer (born 1998)

Personal information
- Date of birth: 9 July 1998 (age 28)
- Place of birth: Tórshavn
- Height: 1.79 m (5 ft 10 in)
- Position: Left-back

Team information
- Current team: KÍ Klaksvík
- Number: 6

Youth career
- HB

Senior career*
Years	Team	Apps	(Gls)
2015–2022	HB	147	(18)
2022–2023	Fredericia	2	(0)
2023	HB	2	(0)
2023–2024	Thisted	27	(4)
2024–2025	Hillerød	25	(3)
2025–	KÍ Klaksvík	37	(6)

International career^{‡}
2015	Faroe Islands U-19	1	(0)
2019–2020	Faroe Islands U-21	8	(0)
2021–	Faroe Islands	9	(0)
- * Club domestic league appearances and goals as of 1 November 2026 ‡ National team caps and goals as of 9 June 2025 (UTC)

Daniel Johansen (born 9 July 1998) is a Faroese footballer who plays for KÍ Klaksvík.

== Personal life ==
Johansen works as an assistant in the after school club called frítíðarskúlin á argjahamri while also playing football.

== International career ==
He was first called up to the Faroe Islands national football team in September 2020, but did not play that season.

He made his debut on 1 September 2021 in a World Cup qualifier against Israel, a 0–4 home loss. He substituted Klæmint Olsen in the 76th minute.
