= Leo Smith (footballer) =

English footballer (born 1998)

Personal information
- Full name: Leo Smith
- Date of birth: 15 May 1998 (age 28)
- Place of birth: Porthmadog, Wales
- Height: 5 ft 10 in (1.79 m)
- Position: Midfielder

Team information
- Current team: The New Saints
- Number: 21

Youth career
- Porthmadog Juniors
- 2010–2016: Wrexham

Senior career*
Years	Team	Apps	(Gls)
2016–2019	Wrexham	27	(1)
2018–2019	→ Llandudno (loan)	19	(1)
2019	→ Caernarfon Town (loan)	8	(0)
2019–2020	Caernarfon Town	21	(4)
2020–	The New Saints	142	(12)
- * Club domestic league appearances and goals as of 09:46, 14 September 2026 (UTC)

Leo Smith (born 15 May 1998) is a Welsh professional footballer who plays as a midfielder for Cymru Premier club The New Saints.

== Career ==
=== Wrexham ===
Smith progressed through the ranks of the Wrexham youth side, eventually earning his first team debut on 22 October 2016, coming off the bench to replace Tyler Harvey in a 2–1 home win over Bromley.

Smith would go on to impress that season, earning the club's Young Player of the Year award for the 2016–17 season.

However, after that season, Smith's chances in the first team became fewer and fewer, and he was loaned out to Llandudno, and Caernarfon Town during the 2018–19 season.

=== Caernarfon Town ===
After his loan spell ended and subsequent release from Wrexham, Smith signed for Caernarfon Town permanently on 5 July 2019.

=== The New Saints ===
After impressing at Caernarfon Town, Smith returned to full-time football and joined The New Saints on 30 June 2020.

== International career ==
Smith was called up to the Wales C squad to face England C in March 2020, however the game was cancelled due to the COVID-19 pandemic.
