= Bedsenté Gomis =

French footballer (born 1988)

Personal information
- Date of birth: 14 April 1988 (age 38)
- Place of birth: Mont-Saint-Aignan, France
- Height: 1.81 m (5 ft 11 in)
- Position: Midfielder

Youth career
- Mont-Saint-Aignan
- 2000–2003: Quevilly
- 2003–2008: Lens

Senior career*
Years	Team	Apps	(Gls)
2006–2009	Lens B	68	(3)
2009–2010	Puertollano	24	(2)
2010–2011	Almería B	13	(2)
2014	Southend United	2	(0)
2014–2017	Sutton United	99	(12)
2017–2018	Barrow	43	(5)
2018–2019	Dover Athletic	28	(4)
2020–2021	Havant & Waterlooville	20	(2)
2021	Sant Julià	5	(0)
2021–	Gosport Borough		
- * Club domestic league appearances and goals

Bedsenté Gomis (born 14 April 1988) is a former semi-professional footballer who played as a midfielder for Gosport Borough.

== Career ==
A trainee of both US Quevilly and RC Lens, Gomis made his senior debuts with the latter's reserve team in season 2005–06 season. He moved to Spain two and a half seasons later, signing with CD Puertollano in Segunda División B.

In August 2010 Gomis signed with UD Almería, being assigned to the reserves also in the third level. After appearing sparingly with the Andalusians in the campaign (576 minutes overall), he was released.

On 4 January 2014, after two and a half seasons without a club, Gomis joined Football League Two club Southend United, in a six-month deal. Seven days later, he appeared on the bench in a 1–1 away draw against Plymouth Argyle.

Gomis made his debut for Southend on 15 February, playing the last 21 minutes of a 2–3 home loss to Exeter City. On 23 May, after appearing in only one further match, he was released.

In October 2014 Gomis signed a one-year deal with Conference South side Sutton United.

Gomis made his debut for Sutton in the FA Cup 2nd Qualifying Round in a 3–2 victory over FC Romania on 27 September 2014. He made his first league appearance one week later in a 3–1 home victory against Bath City and scored his first goal for the U's in a 2–2 draw with Basingstoke Town on 6 December 2014. He went on to make 26 full and three substitute league appearances in the 2014–15 season, scoring four goals. At the end of the season, Gomis was voted Player of the Year by Sutton supporters. In the 2015–16 season, Gomis made 24 full and three substitute league appearances for the U's and scored seven goals, helping the team win the National League South title.

Gomis scored his first goal with the newly promoted side in the National League in a 2–0 home victory against Macclesfield Town on 20 August 2016, finishing an assist from Roarie Deacon. On 17 December 2016, Gomis made his 100th career appearance for Sutton in a 1–0 home victory over Wrexham.

Gomis appeared in Sutton's historic run to the 5th round of the FA Cup for the first time ever, including appearances in a 3–1 victory over local rivals AFC Wimbledon of League One on 17 January 2017, a 1–0 victory over Championship side Leeds United on 29 January and an eventual 2–0 defeat to Premier League club Arsenal on 20 February.

On 23 June 2017, Bedsenté joined Barrow.

On 3 July 2018, Gomis joined fellow National League team Dover Athletic.

He was a free agent after leaving Dover in July 2019.

On 28 January 2020, Gomis joined Havant & Waterlooville.

On 1 July 2021, Gomis left Havant & Waterlooville to join Andorran club Sant Julià.

On 9 November 2021, Gomis signed for Gosport Borough.

== Honours ==
Sutton United

- National League South champions: 2015–16

== Career statistics ==
As of match played 6 January 2018

Appearances and goals by club, season and competition
Club	Season	League			National cup		League cup		Other		Total	
Club	Season	Division	Apps	Goals	Apps	Goals	Apps	Goals	Apps	Goals	Apps	Goals
Puertollano	2008–09	Segunda División B	4	0	0	0	—		—		4	0
Puertollano	2009–10	Segunda División B	20	2	2	0	—		—		22	2
Puertollano	Total		24	2	2	0	—		0	0	26	2
Almería B	2010–11	Segunda División B	13	2	0	0	—		—		13	2
Southend United	2013–14	League Two	2	0	0	0	0	0	0	0	2	0
Sutton United	2014–15	Conference South	29	4	2	0	—		3 (Note: Two appearances in the FA Trophy and one in the Surrey Senior Cup)	0	34	4
Sutton United	2015–16	National League South	27	7	2	0	—		7 (Note: Six appearances in the FA Trophy and one in the Surrey Senior Cup)	0	36	7
Sutton United	2016–17	National League	43	1	6	0	—		4 (Note: Appearances in the FA Trophy)	0	53	1
Sutton United	Total		99	12	10	0	0	0	14	0	123	12
Barrow	2017–18	National League	28	4	1	0	—		1	0	30	4
Career total			166	20	13	0	0	0	15	0	194	20
