= 2021–22 UEFA Europa Conference League =

European football tournament

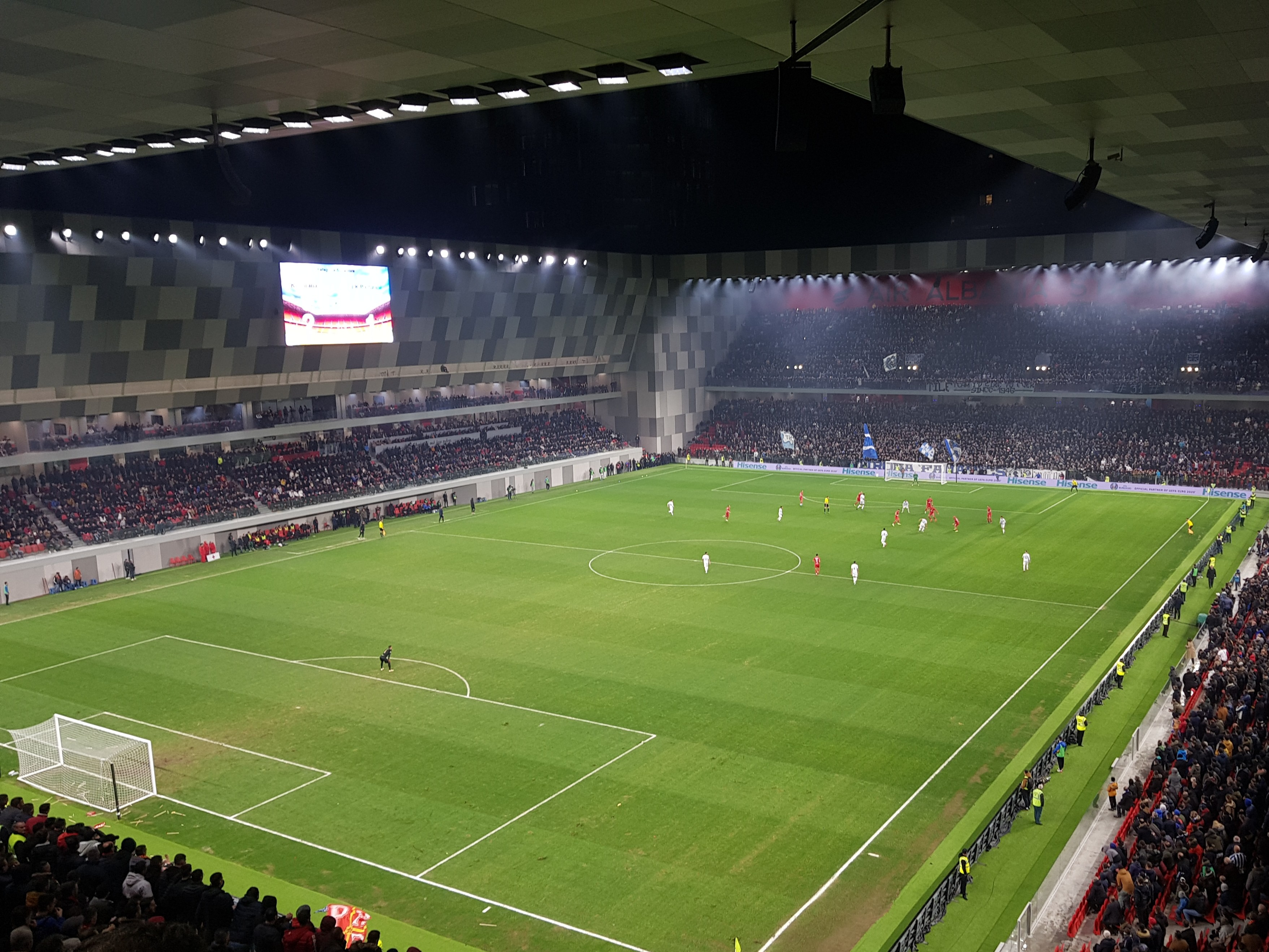
- The Arena Kombëtare in Tirana hosted the final

Tournament details
- Dates: Qualifying: 6 July – 26 August 2021; Competition proper: 14 September 2021 – 25 May 2022
- Teams: Competition proper: 32+8; Total: 136+45 (from 54 associations)

Final positions
- Champions: (Italy) Roma (1st title)
- Runners-up: (Netherlands) Feyenoord

Tournament statistics
- Matches played: 140
- Goals scored: 401 (2.86 per match)
- Attendance: 1,978,850 (14,135 per match)
- Top scorer(s): (Nigeria) Cyriel Dessers (Feyenoord); 10 goals
- Best player: (Italy) Lorenzo Pellegrini (Roma)
- Best young player: (Colombia) Luis Sinisterra (Feyenoord)

The 2021–22 UEFA Europa Conference League was the inaugural season of the UEFA Europa Conference League, Europe's tertiary club football tournament organised by UEFA.

The final was played at the Arena Kombëtare in Tirana, Albania, with Roma defeating Feyenoord 1–0. As winners, Roma automatically qualified for the 2022–23 UEFA Europa League group stage, although they had already done so through their league position.

This season was the first since 1998-1999, where three major European club competitions (UEFA Champions League, UEFA Europa League, and UEFA Europa Conference League) took place.

On 24 June 2021, UEFA approved the proposal to abolish the away goals rule in all UEFA club competitions, which had been used since 1965. Therefore, if in a two-legged tie, two teams scored the same number of aggregate goals, the winner was not decided by the number of away goals scored by each team, but always by 30 minutes of extra time, and if the two teams scored the same number of goals in extra time, the winner was decided by a penalty shoot-out.

== Association team allocation ==
A total of 181 teams from 54 of the 55 UEFA member associations participated in the 2021–22 UEFA Europa Conference League (the exception being Spain, as none of their teams finished third in the Europa League group stage). The association ranking based on the UEFA country coefficients was used to determine the number of participating teams for each association:

- Associations 1–5 each had one team qualify.
  - Association 1 (Spain) did not have any team qualify for this season, as the team which would have participated, Villarreal, won the 2020–21 UEFA Europa League and earned a place in the 2021–22 UEFA Champions League.
- Associations 6–15 and 51–55 each had two teams qualify.
- Associations 16–50 (except Liechtenstein) each had three teams qualify.
  - As the UEFA Europa Conference League title holders' berth in the UEFA Europa League was vacant this season, association 16 (Cyprus) had their domestic cup winner promoted from the Europa Conference League to the Europa League, so they only had two teams qualify.
- Liechtenstein had one team qualify (Liechtenstein organised only a domestic cup and no domestic league).
- Moreover, 20 teams eliminated from the 2021–22 UEFA Champions League and 26 teams eliminated from the 2021–22 UEFA Europa League were transferred to the Europa Conference League.
  - For this season, only 19 teams eliminated from the 2021–22 UEFA Champions League were transferred, as there was one fewer team competing in the Champions Path qualifying of the 2021–22 UEFA Champions League.

=== Association ranking ===
For the 2021–22 UEFA Europa Conference League, the associations were allocated places according to their 2020 UEFA country coefficients, which took into account their performance in European competitions from 2015–16 to 2019–20.

Apart from the allocation based on the country coefficients, associations could have additional teams participating in the Europa Conference League, as noted below:

- (UCL) – Additional/vacated teams transferred from/to the UEFA Champions League
- (UEL) – Additional teams transferred from the UEFA Europa League

Association ranking for 2021–22 UEFA Europa Conference League

| Rank | Association | Coeff. | Teams | Notes |
|---|---|---|---|---|
| 1 | Spain | 102.283 | 1 | –1 (UCL) |
| 2 | England | 90.462 | 1 | +1 (UEL) |
| 3 | Germany | 74.784 | 1 | |
| 4 | Italy | 70.653 | 1 | |
| 5 | France | 59.248 | 1 | +1 (UEL) |
| 6 | Portugal | 49.449 | 2 | |
| 7 | Russia | 45.549 | 2 | |
| 8 | Belgium | 37.900 | 2 | |
| 9 | Ukraine | 36.100 | 2 | +1 (UEL) |
| 10 | Netherlands | 35.750 | 2 | +2 (UEL) |
| 11 | Turkey | 33.600 | 2 | +1 (UEL) |
| 12 | Austria | 32.925 | 2 | +1 (UEL) |
| 13 | Denmark | 29.250 | 2 | +2 (UEL) |
| 14 | Scotland | 27.875 | 2 | +2 (UEL) |
| 15 | Czech Republic | 27.300 | 2 | +3 (UEL) |
| 16 | Cyprus | 26.750 | 2 | +2 (UEL) |
| 17 | Switzerland | 26.400 | 3 | |
| 18 | Greece | 26.300 | 3 | |
| 19 | Serbia | 25.500 | 3 | |

| Rank | Association | Coeff. | Teams | Notes |
|---|---|---|---|---|
| 20 | Croatia | 24.875 | 3 | |
| 21 | Sweden | 22.750 | 3 | |
| 22 | Norway | 21.750 | 3 | +1 (UCL) |
| 23 | Israel | 19.625 | 3 | +1 (UCL) |
| 24 | Kazakhstan | 19.250 | 3 | +1 (UEL) |
| 25 | Belarus | 18.875 | 3 | +1 (UCL) |
| 26 | Azerbaijan | 18.750 | 3 | +1 (UEL) |
| 27 | Bulgaria | 17.375 | 3 | |
| 28 | Romania | 16.700 | 3 | +1 (UEL) |
| 29 | Poland | 16.625 | 3 | |
| 30 | Slovakia | 15.875 | 3 | +1 (UEL) |
| 31 | Liechtenstein | 13.500 | 1 | |
| 32 | Slovenia | 13.000 | 3 | +1 (UEL) |
| 33 | Hungary | 12.875 | 3 | |
| 34 | Luxembourg | 8.000 | 3 | +1 (UCL) |
| 35 | Lithuania | 7.875 | 3 | +1 (UEL) |
| 36 | Armenia | 7.625 | 3 | +1 (UEL) |
| 37 | Latvia | 7.625 | 3 | +1 (UCL) |

| Rank | Association | Coeff. | Teams | Notes |
|---|---|---|---|---|
| 38 | Albania | 7.375 | 3 | +1 (UCL) |
| 39 | North Macedonia | 7.375 | 3 | +1 (UCL) |
| 40 | Bosnia and Herzegovina | 6.875 | 3 | +1 (UCL) |
| 41 | Moldova | 6.750 | 3 | |
| 42 | Republic of Ireland | 6.700 | 3 | +1 (UCL) |
| 43 | Finland | 6.500 | 3 | +1 (UEL) |
| 44 | Georgia | 5.750 | 3 | +1 (UCL) |
| 45 | Malta | 5.750 | 3 | +1 (UCL) |
| 46 | Iceland | 5.375 | 3 | +1 (UCL) |
| 47 | Wales | 5.000 | 3 | +1 (UCL) |
| 48 | Northern Ireland | 4.875 | 3 | +1 (UCL) |
| 49 | Gibraltar | 4.750 | 3 | +1 (UEL) |
| 50 | Montenegro | 4.375 | 3 | +1 (UCL) |
| 51 | Estonia | 4.375 | 2 | +1 (UEL) |
| 52 | Kosovo | 4.000 | 2 | +1 (UCL) |
| 53 | Faroe Islands | 3.750 | 2 | +1 (UCL) |
| 54 | Andorra | 2.831 | 2 | +1 (UCL) |
| 55 | San Marino | 0.666 | 2 | +1 (UCL) |

=== Distribution ===
The following is the access list for this season. In the default access list, the title holders of the Europa Conference League qualify for the Europa League group stage. However, since this berth was vacant this season, the following changes to the access list were made:

- The cup winners of association 16 (Cyprus) enter the Europa League third qualifying round instead of the second qualifying round.
- The cup winners of associations 30 (Slovakia) and 31 (Liechtenstein) enter the second qualifying round instead of the first qualifying round.

As Villarreal, which otherwise would have qualified for the Europa Conference League play-off round via their domestic league, won the 2020–21 UEFA Europa League, thereby earning an automatic spot in the Champions League group stage as the Europa League title holders, thus vacating a berth in the play-off round and not passed down to any other Spanish club. The following changes were confirmed by UEFA:

- The domestic cup winners of associations 17 (Switzerland) and 18 (Greece) enter the third qualifying round instead of the second qualifying round.
- The domestic cup winners of associations 32 to 35 (Slovenia, Hungary, Luxembourg, Lithuania) enter the second qualifying round instead of the first qualifying round.

Moreover, in the default access list, originally 17 losers from the Champions League first qualifying round were transferred to the Europa Conference League second qualifying round (Champions Path). However, since the Champions League title holders, Chelsea, which were guaranteed a berth in the Champions League group stage, already qualified via their domestic league, only 16 losers from the Champions League first qualifying round were transferred to the Europa Conference League second qualifying round (Champions Path) after the Champions League access list was rebalanced. As a result, only 19 teams entered the Champions Path second qualifying round (one of the losers from the Champions League first qualifying round was drawn to receive a bye to the third qualifying round).

Access list for 2021–22 UEFA Europa Conference League
| | | Teams entering in this round | Teams advancing from previous round | Teams transferred from Champions League or Europa League |
|---|---|---|---|---|
| First qualifying round (66 teams) | | 20 domestic cup winners from associations 36–55; 25 domestic league runners-up from associations 30–55 (except Liechtenstein); 21 domestic league third-placed teams from associations 29–50 (except Liechtenstein) | | |
| Second qualifying round (108 teams) | Champions Path (18 teams) | | | 3 teams eliminated from Champions League preliminary round; 15 teams eliminated from Champions League first qualifying round |
| Second qualifying round (108 teams) | Main Path (90 teams) | 17 domestic cup winners from associations 19–35; 14 domestic league runners-up from associations 16–29; 16 domestic league third-placed teams from associations 13–28; 9 domestic league fourth-placed teams from associations 7–15; 1 domestic league fifth-placed team from association 6 | 33 winners from the first qualifying round | |
| Third qualifying round (64 teams) | Champions Path (10 teams) | | 9 winners from the second qualifying round (Champions Path) | 1 team eliminated from Champions League first qualifying round |
| Third qualifying round (64 teams) | Main Path (54 teams) | 2 domestic cup winners from associations 17–18; 6 domestic league third-placed teams from associations 7–12; 1 domestic league fourth-placed team from association 6 | 45 winners from the second qualifying round (Main Path) | |
| Play-off round (44 teams) | Champions Path (10 teams) | | 5 winners from the third qualifying round (Champions Path) | 5 teams eliminated from Europa League third qualifying round (Champions Path) |
| Play-off round (44 teams) | Main Path (34 teams) | 1 domestic league fifth-placed team from association 5; 3 domestic league sixth-placed teams from associations 1–4 (EFL Cup winners for England) (except Europa League title holder) | 27 winners from the third qualifying round (Main Path) | 3 teams eliminated from Europa League third qualifying round (Main Path) |
| Group stage (32 teams) | | | 5 winners from the play-off round (Champions Path); 17 winners from the play-off round (Main Path) | 10 teams eliminated from Europa League play-off round |
| Preliminary knockout round (16 teams) | | | 8 group runners-up from the group stage | 8 group third-placed teams from Europa League group stage |
| Knockout phase (16 teams) | | | 8 group winners from the group stage; 8 winners from the preliminary knockout round | |

=== Teams ===
The labels in the parentheses show how each team qualified for the place of its starting round:

- CW: Domestic cup winners
- 2nd, 3rd, 4th, 5th, 6th, etc.: League position of the previous season
- LC: League cup winners
- RW: Regular season winners
- PW: End-of-season Europa Conference League play-offs winners
- UCL: Transferred from the Champions League
  - Q1: Losers from the first qualifying round
  - PR: Losers from the preliminary round (F: final; SF: semi-finals)
- UEL: Transferred from the Europa League
  - GS: Third-placed teams from the group stage
  - PO: Losers from the play-off round
  - CH/MP Q3: Losers from the third qualifying round (Champions/Main Path)
- Abd-: League positions of abandoned season due to the COVID-19 pandemic in Europe as determined by the national association; all teams were subject to approval by UEFA as per the guidelines for entry to European competitions in response to the COVID-19 pandemic.

The second qualifying round, third qualifying round and play-off round were divided into Champions Path (CH) and Main Path (MP).

Qualified teams for 2021–22 UEFA Europa Conference League
| Entry round | | Teams | | | |
|---|---|---|---|---|---|
| Knockout round play-offs | | (Czech Republic) Sparta Prague (UEL GS) | (Netherlands) PSV Eindhoven (UEL GS) | (England) Leicester City (UEL GS) | (Turkey) Fenerbahçe (UEL GS) |
| Knockout round play-offs | | (France) Marseille (UEL GS) | (Denmark) Midtjylland (UEL GS) | (Scotland) Celtic (UEL GS) | (Austria) Rapid Wien (UEL GS) |
| Group stage | | (Ukraine) Zorya Luhansk (UEL PO) | (Netherlands) AZ (UEL PO) | (Denmark) Randers (UEL PO) | (Czech Republic) Slavia Prague (UEL PO) |
| Group stage | | (Cyprus) Omonia (UEL PO) | (Romania) CFR Cluj (UEL PO) | (Slovakia) Slovan Bratislava (UEL PO) | (Slovenia) Mura (UEL PO) |
| Group stage | | (Armenia) Alashkert (UEL PO) | (Finland) HJK (UEL PO) | | |
| Play-off round | CH | (Kazakhstan) Kairat (UEL CH Q3) | (Azerbaijan) Neftçi (UEL CH Q3) | (Lithuania) Žalgiris (UEL CH Q3) | (Gibraltar) Lincoln Red Imps (UEL CH Q3) |
| Play-off round | CH | (Estonia) Flora (UEL CH Q3) | | | |
| Play-off round | MP | (England) Tottenham Hotspur (7th) | (Germany) Union Berlin (7th) | (Italy) Roma (7th) | (France) Rennes (6th) |
| Play-off round | MP | (Scotland) St Johnstone (UEL MP Q3) | (Czech Republic) Jablonec (UEL MP Q3) | (Cyprus) Anorthosis Famagusta (UEL MP Q3) | |
| Third qualifying round | CH | (Republic of Ireland) Shamrock Rovers (UCL Q1) | | | |
| Third qualifying round | MP | (Portugal) Paços de Ferreira (5th) | (Russia) Rubin Kazan (4th) | (Belgium) Anderlecht (4th) | (Ukraine) Kolos Kovalivka (4th) |
| Third qualifying round | MP | (Netherlands) Vitesse (4th) | (Turkey) Trabzonspor (4th) | (Austria) LASK (4th) | (Switzerland) Luzern (CW) |
| Third qualifying round | MP | (Greece) PAOK (CW) | | | |
| Second qualifying round | CH | (Norway) Bodø/Glimt (UCL Q1) | (Israel) Maccabi Haifa (UCL Q1) | (Belarus) Shakhtyor Soligorsk (UCL Q1) | (Luxembourg) Fola Esch (UCL Q1) |
| Second qualifying round | CH | (Latvia) Riga (UCL Q1) | (Albania) Teuta (UCL Q1) | (North Macedonia) Shkëndija (UCL Q1) | (Bosnia and Herzegovina) Borac Banja Luka (UCL Q1) |
| Second qualifying round | CH | (Georgia (country)) Dinamo Tbilisi (UCL Q1) | (Malta) Hibernians (UCL Q1) | (Iceland) Valur (UCL Q1) | (Wales) Connah's Quay Nomads (UCL Q1) |
| Second qualifying round | CH | (Northern Ireland) Linfield (UCL Q1) | (Montenegro) Budućnost Podgorica (UCL Q1) | (Kosovo) Prishtina (UCL Q1) | (Andorra) Inter Club d'Escaldes (UCL PR F) |
| Second qualifying round | CH | (Faroe Islands) HB (UCL PR SF) | (San Marino) Folgore (UCL PR SF) | | |
| Second qualifying round | MP | (Portugal) Santa Clara (6th) | (Russia) Sochi (5th) | (Belgium) Gent (PW) | (Ukraine) Vorskla Poltava (5th) |
| Second qualifying round | MP | (Netherlands) Feyenoord (PW) | (Turkey) Sivasspor (5th) | Austria Wien (PW) | (Denmark) Copenhagen (3rd) |
| Second qualifying round | MP | (Denmark) AGF (PW) | (Scotland) Hibernian (3rd) | (Scotland) Aberdeen (4th) | (Czech Republic) Slovácko (4th) |
| Second qualifying round | MP | (Czech Republic) Viktoria Plzeň (5th) | (Cyprus) Apollon Limassol (2nd) | (Cyprus) AEL Limassol (3rd) | (Switzerland) Basel (2nd) |
| Second qualifying round | MP | (Switzerland) Servette (3rd) | (Greece) Aris (3rd) | (Greece) AEK Athens (4th) | (Serbia) Partizan (2nd) |
| Second qualifying round | MP | (Serbia) Čukarički (3rd) | (Serbia) Vojvodina (4th) | (Croatia) Osijek (2nd) | (Croatia) Rijeka (3rd) |
| Second qualifying round | MP | (Croatia) Hajduk Split (4th) | (Sweden) Hammarby IF (CW) | (Sweden) IF Elfsborg (2nd) | (Sweden) BK Häcken (3rd) |
| Second qualifying round | MP | (Norway) Molde (2nd) | (Norway) Vålerenga (3rd) | (Norway) Rosenborg (4th) | (Israel) Maccabi Tel Aviv (CW) |
| Second qualifying round | MP | (Israel) Ashdod (3rd) | (Israel) Hapoel Be'er Sheva (4th) | (Kazakhstan) Tobol (2nd) | (Kazakhstan) Astana (3rd) |
| Second qualifying round | MP | (Kazakhstan) Shakhter Karagandy (4th) | (Belarus) BATE Borisov (CW) | (Belarus) Torpedo-BelAZ Zhodino (3rd) | (Belarus) Dynamo Brest (4th) |
| Second qualifying round | MP | (Azerbaijan) Keşla (CW) | (Azerbaijan) Qarabağ (2nd) | (Azerbaijan) Sumgayit (3rd) | (Bulgaria) CSKA Sofia (CW) |
| Second qualifying round | MP | (Bulgaria) Lokomotiv Plovdiv (2nd) | (Bulgaria) Arda (PW) | (Romania) Universitatea Craiova (CW) | (Romania) FCSB (2nd) |
| Second qualifying round | MP | (Romania) Sepsi OSK (PW) | (Poland) Raków Częstochowa (CW) | (Poland) Pogoń Szczecin (3rd) | (Slovakia) DAC Dunajská Streda (2nd) |
| Second qualifying round | MP | (Liechtenstein) Vaduz (Abd-Cup) | (Slovenia) Olimpija Ljubljana (CW) | (Hungary) Újpest (CW) | (Luxembourg) F91 Dudelange (2nd) |
| Second qualifying round | MP | (Lithuania) Panevėžys (CW) | | | |
| First qualifying round | | (Poland) Śląsk Wrocław (4th) | (Slovakia) Spartak Trnava (3rd) | (Slovakia) Žilina (PW) | (Slovenia) Maribor (2nd) |
| First qualifying round | | (Slovenia) Domžale (4th) | (Hungary) Puskás Akadémia (2nd) | (Hungary) MOL Fehérvár (3rd) | (Luxembourg) Swift Hesperange (3rd) |
| First qualifying round | | (Luxembourg) Racing Union (4th) | (Lithuania) Sūduva (2nd) | (Lithuania) Kauno Žalgiris (3rd) | (Armenia) Ararat Yerevan (CW) |
| First qualifying round | | (Armenia) Noah (2nd) | (Armenia) Urartu (3rd) | (Latvia) Liepāja (CW) | (Latvia) RFS (2nd) |
| First qualifying round | | (Latvia) Valmiera (3rd) | (Albania) Vllaznia (CW) | (Albania) Partizani (3rd) | (Albania) Laçi (4th) |
| First qualifying round | | (North Macedonia) Sileks (CW) | (North Macedonia) Shkupi (2nd) | (North Macedonia) Struga (3rd) | (Bosnia and Herzegovina) Sarajevo (CW) |
| First qualifying round | | (Bosnia and Herzegovina) Velež Mostar (3rd) | (Bosnia and Herzegovina) Široki Brijeg (4th) | (Moldova) Sfîntul Gheorghe (CW) | (Moldova) Petrocub Hîncești (2nd) |
| First qualifying round | | (Moldova) Milsami Orhei (3rd) | (Republic of Ireland) Dundalk (CW) | (Republic of Ireland) Bohemians (2nd) | (Republic of Ireland) Sligo Rovers (4th) |
| First qualifying round | | (Finland) Inter Turku (2nd) | (Finland) KuPS (3rd) | (Finland) Honka (4th) | (Georgia (country)) Gagra (CW) |
| First qualifying round | | (Georgia (country)) Dinamo Batumi (2nd) | (Georgia (country)) Dila Gori (3rd) | (Malta) Gżira United (Abd-3rd) | (Malta) Birkirkara (Abd-4th) |
| First qualifying round | | (Malta) Mosta (Abd-6th) | (Iceland) FH (Abd-2nd) | (Iceland) Stjarnan (Abd-3rd) | (Iceland) Breiðablik (Abd-4th) |
| First qualifying round | | (Wales) The New Saints (2nd) | (Wales) Bala Town (3rd) | (Wales) Newtown (PW) | (Northern Ireland) Coleraine (2nd) |
| First qualifying round | | (Northern Ireland) Glentoran (3rd) | (Northern Ireland) Larne (PW) | (Gibraltar) Europa (2nd) | (Gibraltar) St Joseph's (3rd) |
| First qualifying round | | (Gibraltar) Mons Calpe (4th) | (Montenegro) Sutjeska (2nd) | (Montenegro) Dečić (3rd) | (Montenegro) Podgorica (4th) |
| First qualifying round | | (Estonia) FCI Levadia (CW) | (Estonia) Paide Linnameeskond (2nd) | (Kosovo) Llapi (CW) | (Kosovo) Drita (2nd) |
| First qualifying round | | (Faroe Islands) NSÍ (2nd) | (Faroe Islands) KÍ (3rd) | (Andorra) Sant Julià (CW) | (Andorra) FC Santa Coloma (3rd) |
| First qualifying round | | (San Marino) La Fiorita (CW) | (San Marino) Tre Penne (3rd) | | |

Three teams not playing in a national top division took part in the competition: Gagra (2nd tier), Sileks (2nd tier) and Vaduz (2nd tier).

Notes

1. Champions League (UCL Q1): One of the Champions League first qualifying round losers was drawn to receive a bye to the third qualifying round (Champions Path), as one fewer loser was transferred to the second qualifying round (Champions Path), due to a Champions League group stage berth vacated by the Champions League title holders.
2. Iceland (ISL): The 2020 Úrvalsdeild and the 2020 Icelandic Cup were abandoned due to the COVID-19 pandemic in Iceland. The second-placed, third-placed and fourth-placed teams of the league at the time of the abandonment based on the average number of points per matches played for each team, FH, Stjarnan and Breiðablik, were selected to play in the 2021–22 UEFA Europa Conference League by the Football Association of Iceland.
3. Kazakhstan (KAZ): The 2020 Kazakhstan Cup was cancelled due to the COVID-19 pandemic in Kazakhstan. As a result, the fourth-placed team of the 2020 Kazakhstan Premier League was selected to play in the 2021–22 UEFA Europa Conference League by the Football Federation of Kazakhstan.
4. Liechtenstein (LIE):
  - The seven teams affiliated with the Liechtenstein Football Association (LFV) all played in the Swiss football league system. The only competition organised by the LFV was the Liechtenstein Football Cup – the winners of which qualified for the UEFA Europa Conference League.
  - The 2020–21 Liechtenstein Cup was abandoned due to the COVID-19 pandemic in Liechtenstein. The team remaining in the cup with the highest UEFA club coefficient, Vaduz, were selected to play in the 2021–22 UEFA Europa Conference League by the Liechtenstein Football Association, entering the second qualifying round.
5. Luxembourg (LUX): The 2020–21 Luxembourg Cup was abandoned due to the COVID-19 pandemic in Luxembourg. As a result, the fourth-placed team of the 2020–21 Luxembourg National Division was selected to play in the 2021–22 UEFA Europa Conference League by the Luxembourg Football Federation.
6. Malta (MLT): The 2020–21 Maltese Premier League and the 2020–21 Maltese FA Trophy were abandoned due to the COVID-19 pandemic in Malta. Originally the second, third and fourth-placed teams of the league at the time of the abandonment, Hibernians, Gżira United and Birkirkara, were selected to play in the 2021–22 UEFA Europa Conference League by the Malta Football Association. However, Hamrun Spartans who were declared champions were subsequently banned from European competitions for match fixing. As a result, Hibernians were elevated to the 2021–22 UEFA Champions League and Mosta, the sixth-placed team, were selected to play in the UEFA Europa Conference League, since Sliema Wanderers, the fifth-placed team, failed to obtain a UEFA licence.
7. Norway (NOR): The 2020 Norwegian Football Cup was cancelled due to the COVID-19 pandemic in Norway. As a result, the fourth-placed team of the 2020 Eliteserien was selected to play in the 2021–22 UEFA Europa Conference League by the Norwegian Football Federation.
8. Wales (WAL): The 2020–21 Welsh Cup was cancelled due to the COVID-19 pandemic in Wales. As a result, the third-placed team from the 2020–21 Cymru Premier was selected to play in the 2021–22 UEFA Europa Conference League by the Football Association of Wales.

== Schedule ==
The schedule of the competition was as follows. Matches were scheduled for Thursdays apart from the final, which took place on a Wednesday, though exceptionally could take place on Tuesdays or Wednesdays due to scheduling conflicts (especially featuring teams from countries where there were very few sufficient stadiums, such as Gibraltar and Wales). Scheduled kick-off times starting from the group stage were 18:45 (instead of 18:55 previously) and 21:00 CEST/CET, though exceptionally could take place at 16:30 due to geographical reasons.

All draws started at 13:00 or 14:00 CEST/CET and were held at the UEFA headquarters in Nyon, Switzerland. On 16 July 2021, UEFA announced that the group stage draw would be held in Istanbul, Turkey.

Schedule for 2021–22 UEFA Europa Conference League
| Phase | Round | Draw date | First leg | Second leg |
|---|---|---|---|---|
| Qualifying | First qualifying round | 15 June 2021 | 8 July 2021 | 15 July 2021 |
| Qualifying | Second qualifying round | 16 June 2021 | 22 July 2021 | 29 July 2021 |
| Qualifying | Third qualifying round | 19 July 2021 | 5 August 2021 | 12 August 2021 |
| Play-offs | Play-off round | 2 August 2021 | 19 August 2021 | 26 August 2021 |
| Group stage | Matchday 1 | 27 August 2021 | 16 September 2021 | |
| Group stage | Matchday 2 | 27 August 2021 | 30 September 2021 | |
| Group stage | Matchday 3 | 27 August 2021 | 21 October 2021 | |
| Group stage | Matchday 4 | 27 August 2021 | 4 November 2021 | |
| Group stage | Matchday 5 | 27 August 2021 | 25 November 2021 | |
| Group stage | Matchday 6 | 27 August 2021 | 9 December 2021 | |
| Knockout phase | Knockout round play-offs | 13 December 2021 | 17 February 2022 | 24 February 2022 |
| Knockout phase | Round of 16 | 25 February 2022 | 10 March 2022 | 17 March 2022 |
| Knockout phase | Quarter-finals | 18 March 2022 | 7 April 2022 | 14 April 2022 |
| Knockout phase | Semi-finals | 18 March 2022 | 28 April 2022 | 5 May 2022 |
| Knockout phase | Final | 18 March 2022 | 25 May 2022 at Arena Kombëtare, Tirana | |

== Qualifying rounds ==
=== First qualifying round ===
The draw for the first qualifying round was held on 15 June 2021, 13:30 CEST. The first legs were played on 6 and 8 July, and the second legs were played on 13 and 15 July 2021.

The winners of the ties advanced to the Main Path second qualifying round. The losers were eliminated from European competitions for the season.

| Team 1 | Agg. | Team 2 | 1st leg | 2nd leg |
|---|---|---|---|---|
| FCI Levadia (Estonia) | 4–4 | (Gibraltar) St Joseph's | 3–1 | 1–3 6-5p |
| Inter Turku (Finland) | 1–3 | (Hungary) Puskás Akadémia | 1–1 | 0–2 |
| Drita (Kosovo) | 3–1 (Note: Order of legs reversed after original draw.) | (Montenegro) Dečić | 2–1 | 1–0 |
| Sūduva (Lithuania) | 2–1 | (Latvia) Valmiera | 2–1 | 0–0 |
| Birkirkara (Malta) | 2–1 | (San Marino) La Fiorita | 1–0 | 1–1 |
| Mons Calpe (Gibraltar) | 1–5 | (Andorra) FC Santa Coloma | 1–1 | 0–4 |
| Velež Mostar (Bosnia and Herzegovina) | 4–2 | (Northern Ireland) Coleraine | 2–1 | 2–1 |
| Domžale (Slovenia) | 2–1 | (Luxembourg) Swift Hesperange | 1–0 | 1–1 |
| Shkupi (North Macedonia) | 3–1 | (Kosovo) Llapi | 2–0 | 1–1 |
| Tre Penne (San Marino) | 0–7 | (Georgia (country)) Dinamo Batumi | 0–4 | 0–3 |
| Partizani (Albania) | 8–4 | (Moldova) Sfîntul Gheorghe | 5–2 | 3–2 |
| Maribor (Slovenia) | 2–0 | (Armenia) Urartu | 1–0 | 1–0 |
| Podgorica (Montenegro) | 1–3 | (Albania) Laçi | 1–0 | 0–3 (a.e.t.) |
| Milsami Orhei (Moldova) | 1–0 | (Bosnia and Herzegovina) Sarajevo | 0–0 | 1–0 |
| Noah (Armenia) | 1–5 | (Finland) KuPS | 1–0 | 0–5 |
| Žilina (Slovakia) | 6–3 | (Georgia (country)) Dila Gori | 5–1 | 1–2 |
| FH (Iceland) | 3–1 | (Republic of Ireland) Sligo Rovers | 1–0 | 2–1 |
| Paide Linnameeskond (Estonia) | 1–4 | (Poland) Śląsk Wrocław | 1–2 | 0–2 |
| RFS (Latvia) | 6–5 | (Faroe Islands) KÍ | 2–3 | 4–2 (a.e.t.) |
| Bala Town (Wales) | 0–2 | (Northern Ireland) Larne | 0–1 | 0–1 |
| MOL Fehérvár (Hungary) | 1–3 | (Armenia) Ararat Yerevan | 1–1 | 0–2 |
| Sutjeska (Montenegro) | 2–1 | (Georgia (country)) Gagra | 1–0 | 1–1 |
| Sileks (North Macedonia) | 1–2 | (Moldova) Petrocub Hîncești | 1–1 | 0–1 |
| Široki Brijeg (Bosnia and Herzegovina) | 3–4 | (Albania) Vllaznia | 3–1 | 0–3 |
| Stjarnan (Iceland) | 1–4 | (Republic of Ireland) Bohemians | 1–1 | 0–3 |
| Glentoran (Northern Ireland) | 1–3 | (Wales) The New Saints | 1–1 | 0–2 |
| Sant Julià (Andorra) | 1–1 (3–5 p) | (Malta) Gżira United | 0–0 | 1–1 (a.e.t.) |
| Europa (Gibraltar) | 0–2 | (Lithuania) Kauno Žalgiris | 0–0 | 0–2 |
| Dundalk (Republic of Ireland) | 5–0 | (Wales) Newtown | 4–0 | 1–0 |
| Mosta (Malta) | 3–4 | (Slovakia) Spartak Trnava | 3–2 | 0–2 |
| Liepāja (Latvia) | 5–2 | (North Macedonia) Struga | 1–1 | 4–1 |
| Racing Union (Luxembourg) | 2–5 | (Iceland) Breiðablik | 2–3 | 0–2 |
| Honka (Finland) | 3–1 | (Faroe Islands) NSÍ | 0–0 | 3–1 |

=== Second qualifying round ===
The draw for the second qualifying round was held on 16 June 2021, 13:30 CEST. The first legs were played on 20, 21 and 22 July, and the second legs were played on 27 and 29 July 2021.

The winners of the ties advanced to the third qualifying round of their respective path. The losers were eliminated from European competitions for the season.

| Team 1 | Agg. | Team 2 | 1st leg | 2nd leg |
|---|---|---|---|---|
Champions Path
| Shamrock Rovers (Republic of Ireland) | Bye | N/A | — | — |
| Teuta (Albania) | 3–2 | (Andorra) Inter Club d'Escaldes | 0–2 | 3–0 (a.e.t.) |
| Riga (Latvia) | 3–0 | (North Macedonia) Shkëndija | 2–0 | 1–0 |
| Dinamo Tbilisi (Georgia (country)) | 2–7 | (Israel) Maccabi Haifa | 1–2 | 1–5 |
| HB (Faroe Islands) | 6–0 (Note: Order of legs reversed after original draw.) | (Montenegro) Budućnost Podgorica | 4–0 | 2–0 |
| Linfield (Northern Ireland) | 4–0 | (Bosnia and Herzegovina) Borac Banja Luka | 4–0 | 0–0 |
| Shakhtyor Soligorsk (Belarus) | 1–3 | (Luxembourg) Fola Esch | 1–2 | 0–1 |
| Folgore (San Marino) | 3–7 | (Malta) Hibernians | 1–3 | 2–4 |
| Prishtina (Kosovo) | 6–5 | (Wales) Connah's Quay Nomads | 4–1 | 2–4 |
| Valur (Iceland) | 0–6 | (Norway) Bodø/Glimt | 0–3 | 0–3 |
Main Path
| KuPS (Finland) | 5–4 | (Ukraine) Vorskla Poltava | 2–2 | 3–2 (a.e.t.) |
| FCSB (Romania) | 2–2 (3–5 p) | (Kazakhstan) Shakhter Karagandy | 1–0 | 1–2 (a.e.t.) |
| Arda (Bulgaria) | 0–6 | (Israel) Hapoel Be'er Sheva | 0–2 | 0–4 |
| Apollon Limassol (Cyprus) | 3–5 | (Slovakia) Žilina | 1–3 | 2–2 |
| Čukarički (Serbia) | 2–0 | (Azerbaijan) Sumgayit | 0–0 | 2–0 |
| Sutjeska (Montenegro) | 1–3 | (Israel) Maccabi Tel Aviv | 0–0 | 1–3 |
| Astana (Kazakhstan) | 3–2 | (Greece) Aris | 2–0 | 1–2 (a.e.t.) |
| Petrocub Hîncești (Moldova) | 0–2 | (Turkey) Sivasspor | 0–1 | 0–1 |
| AEL Limassol (Cyprus) | 2–0 | (Albania) Vllaznia | 1–0 | 1–0 |
| Sochi (Russia) | 7–2 | (Azerbaijan) Keşla | 3–0 | 4–2 |
| IF Elfsborg (Sweden) | 9–0 | (Moldova) Milsami Orhei | 4–0 | 5–0 |
| RFS (Latvia) | 5–0 | (Hungary) Puskás Akadémia | 3–0 | 2–0 |
| Dinamo Batumi (Georgia (country)) | 4–2 | (Belarus) BATE Borisov | 0–1 | 4–1 |
| Partizan (Serbia) | 3–0 | (Slovakia) DAC Dunajská Streda | 1–0 | 2–0 |
| Dundalk (Republic of Ireland) | 4–3 | (Estonia) FCI Levadia | 2–2 | 2–1 |
| Gżira United (Malta) | 0–3 | (Croatia) Rijeka | 0–2 | 0–1 |
| Viktoria Plzeň (Czech Republic) | 4–2 | (Belarus) Dynamo Brest | 2–1 | 2–1 |
| Kauno Žalgiris (Lithuania) | 1–10 | (Wales) The New Saints | 0–5 | 1–5 |
| Domžale (Slovenia) | 2–1 | (Finland) Honka | 1–1 | 1–0 |
| CSKA Sofia (Bulgaria) | 0–0 (3–1 p) | (Latvia) Liepāja | 0–0 | 0–0 (a.e.t.) |
| Shkupi (North Macedonia) | 0–5 | (Portugal) Santa Clara | 0–3 | 0–2 |
| Hibernian (Scotland) | 5–1 | (Andorra) FC Santa Coloma | 3–0 | 2–1 |
| Larne (Northern Ireland) | 3–2 | (Denmark) AGF | 2–1 | 1–1 |
| Gent (Belgium) | 4–2 | (Norway) Vålerenga | 4–0 | 0–2 |
| F91 Dudelange (Luxembourg) | 0–4 | (Republic of Ireland) Bohemians | 0–1 | 0–3 |
| Velež Mostar (Bosnia and Herzegovina) | 2–2 (3–2 p) | (Greece) AEK Athens | 2–1 | 0–1 (a.e.t.) |
| Qarabağ (Azerbaijan) | 1–0 | (Israel) Ashdod | 0–0 | 1–0 |
| Lokomotiv Plovdiv (Bulgaria) | 1–1 (3–2 p) | (Czech Republic) Slovácko | 1–0 | 0–1 (a.e.t.) |
| Ararat Yerevan (Armenia) | 5–7 | (Poland) Śląsk Wrocław | 2–4 | 3–3 |
| Laçi (Albania) | 1–0 | (Romania) Universitatea Craiova | 1–0 | 0–0 |
| Drita (Kosovo) | 2–3 | (Netherlands) Feyenoord | 0–0 | 2–3 |
| Basel (Switzerland) | 5–0 | (Albania) Partizani | 3–0 | 2–0 |
| Pogoń Szczecin (Poland) | 0–1 | (Croatia) Osijek | 0–0 | 0–1 |
| Austria Wien | 2–3 | (Iceland) Breiðablik | 1–1 | 1–2 |
| Olimpija Ljubljana (Slovenia) | 1–1 (5–4 p) | (Malta) Birkirkara | 1–0 | 0–1 (a.e.t.) |
| Hammarby IF (Sweden) | 4–1 | (Slovenia) Maribor | 3–1 | 1–0 |
| Molde (Norway) | 3–2 | (Switzerland) Servette | 3–0 | 0–2 |
| Újpest (Hungary) | 5–2 | (Liechtenstein) Vaduz | 2–1 | 3–1 |
| Sūduva (Lithuania) | 0–0 (3–4 p) | (Poland) Raków Częstochowa | 0–0 | 0–0 (a.e.t.) |
| Spartak Trnava (Slovakia) | 1–1 (4–3 p) | (Romania) Sepsi OSK | 0–0 | 1–1 (a.e.t.) |
| FH (Iceland) | 1–6 | (Norway) Rosenborg | 0–2 | 1–4 |
| Copenhagen (Denmark) | 9–1 | (Belarus) Torpedo-BelAZ Zhodino | 4–1 | 5–0 |
| Panevėžys (Lithuania) | 0–2 | (Serbia) Vojvodina | 0–1 | 0–1 |
| Hajduk Split (Croatia) | 3–4 | (Kazakhstan) Tobol | 2–0 | 1–4 (a.e.t.) |
| Aberdeen (Scotland) | 5–3 | (Sweden) BK Häcken | 5–1 | 0–2 |

=== Third qualifying round ===
The draw for the third qualifying round was held on 19 July 2021, 14:00 CEST. The first legs were played on 3 and 5 August, and the second legs were played on 10 and 12 August 2021.

The winners of the ties advanced to the play-off round of their respective path. The losers were eliminated from European competitions for the season.

| Team 1 | Agg. | Team 2 | 1st leg | 2nd leg |
|---|---|---|---|---|
Champions Path
| Maccabi Haifa (Israel) | 7–3 | (Faroe Islands) HB | 7–2 | 0–1 |
| Linfield (Northern Ireland) | 2–4 | (Luxembourg) Fola Esch | 1–2 | 1–2 |
| Shamrock Rovers (Republic of Ireland) | 3–0 | (Albania) Teuta | 1–0 | 2–0 |
| Riga (Latvia) | 4–2 | (Malta) Hibernians | 0–1 | 4–1 (a.e.t.) |
| Prishtina (Kosovo) | 2–3 | (Norway) Bodø/Glimt | 2–1 | 0–2 |
Main Path
| Dinamo Batumi (Georgia (country)) | 2–3 | (Turkey) Sivasspor | 1–2 | 1–1 (a.e.t.) |
| KuPS (Finland) | 5–4 | (Kazakhstan) Astana | 1–1 | 4–3 |
| Sochi (Russia) | 3–3 (2–4 p) | (Serbia) Partizan | 1–1 | 2–2 (a.e.t.) |
| Śląsk Wrocław (Poland) | 2–5 | (Israel) Hapoel Be'er Sheva | 2–1 | 0–4 |
| Santa Clara (Portugal) | 3–0 | (Slovenia) Olimpija Ljubljana | 2–0 | 1–0 |
| Újpest (Hungary) | 1–6 | (Switzerland) Basel | 1–2 | 0–4 |
| IF Elfsborg (Sweden) | 5–2 | (Bosnia and Herzegovina) Velež Mostar | 1–1 | 4–1 |
| Kolos Kovalivka (Ukraine) | 0–0 (1–3 p) | (Kazakhstan) Shakhter Karagandy | 0–0 | 0–0 (a.e.t.) |
| Paços de Ferreira (Portugal) | 4–1 | (Northern Ireland) Larne | 4–0 | 0–1 |
| Luzern (Switzerland) | 0–6 | (Netherlands) Feyenoord | 0–3 | 0–3 |
| Gent (Belgium) | 3–2 | (Latvia) RFS | 2–2 | 1–0 |
| Hibernian (Scotland) | 2–5 | (Croatia) Rijeka | 1–1 | 1–4 |
| Breiðablik (Iceland) | 3–5 | (Scotland) Aberdeen | 2–3 | 1–2 |
| Trabzonspor (Turkey) | 4–4 (4–3 p) | (Norway) Molde | 3–3 | 1–1 (a.e.t.) |
| Bohemians (Republic of Ireland) | 2–3 | (Greece) PAOK | 2–1 | 0–2 |
| The New Saints (Wales) | 5–5 (1–4 p) | (Czech Republic) Viktoria Plzeň | 4–2 | 1–3 (a.e.t.) |
| Raków Częstochowa (Poland) | 1–0 | (Russia) Rubin Kazan | 0–0 | 1–0 (a.e.t.) |
| Lokomotiv Plovdiv (Bulgaria) | 3–5 | (Denmark) Copenhagen | 1–1 | 2–4 |
| Čukarički (Serbia) | 4–6 | (Sweden) Hammarby IF | 3–1 | 1–5 |
| Tobol (Kazakhstan) | 0–6 | (Slovakia) Žilina | 0–1 | 0–5 |
| CSKA Sofia (Bulgaria) | 5–3 | (Croatia) Osijek | 4–2 | 1–1 |
| Vojvodina (Serbia) | 1–7 | (Austria) LASK | 0–1 | 1–6 |
| AEL Limassol (Cyprus) | 1–2 | (Azerbaijan) Qarabağ | 1–1 | 0–1 |
| Spartak Trnava (Slovakia) | 0–1 | (Israel) Maccabi Tel Aviv | 0–0 | 0–1 |
| Rosenborg (Norway) | 8–2 | (Slovenia) Domžale | 6–1 | 2–1 |
| Laçi (Albania) | 1–5 | (Belgium) Anderlecht | 0–3 | 1–2 |
| Vitesse (Netherlands) | 4–3 | (Republic of Ireland) Dundalk | 2–2 | 2–1 |

== Play-off round ==
The draw for the play-off round was held on 2 August 2021, 14:00 CEST. The first legs were played on 19 August, and the second legs were played on 26 August 2021.

The winners of the ties advanced to the group stage. The losers were eliminated from European competitions for the season.

| Team 1 | Agg. | Team 2 | 1st leg | 2nd leg |
|---|---|---|---|---|
Champions Path
| Žalgiris (Lithuania) | 2–3 | (Norway) Bodø/Glimt | 2–2 | 0–1 |
| Neftçi (Azerbaijan) | 3–7 | (Israel) Maccabi Haifa | 3–3 | 0–4 |
| Flora (Estonia) | 5–2 | (Republic of Ireland) Shamrock Rovers | 4–2 | 1–0 |
| Riga (Latvia) | 2–4 | (Gibraltar) Lincoln Red Imps | 1–1 | 1–3 (a.e.t.) |
| Fola Esch (Luxembourg) | 2–7 | (Kazakhstan) Kairat | 1–4 | 1–3 |
Main Path
| Qarabağ (Azerbaijan) | 4–1 | (Scotland) Aberdeen | 1–0 | 3–1 |
| Basel (Switzerland) | 4–4 (4–3 p) | (Sweden) Hammarby IF | 3–1 | 1–3 (a.e.t.) |
| Viktoria Plzeň (Czech Republic) | 2–3 | (Bulgaria) CSKA Sofia | 2–0 | 0–3 (a.e.t.) |
| Paços de Ferreira (Portugal) | 1–3 | (England) Tottenham Hotspur | 1–0 | 0–3 |
| Rennes (France) | 5–1 | (Norway) Rosenborg | 2–0 | 3–1 |
| Anderlecht (Belgium) | 4–5 | (Netherlands) Vitesse | 3–3 | 1–2 |
| LASK (Austria) | 3–1 | (Scotland) St Johnstone | 1–1 | 2–0 |
| Shakhter Karagandy (Kazakhstan) | 1–4 | (Israel) Maccabi Tel Aviv | 1–2 | 0–2 |
| PAOK (Greece) | 3–1 | (Croatia) Rijeka | 1–1 | 2–0 |
| KuPS (Finland) | 0–4 | (Germany) Union Berlin | 0–4 | 0–0 |
| Feyenoord (Netherlands) | 6–3 | (Sweden) IF Elfsborg | 5–0 | 1–3 |
| Raków Częstochowa (Poland) | 1–3 | (Belgium) Gent | 1–0 | 0–3 |
| Sivasspor (Turkey) | 1–7 | (Denmark) Copenhagen | 1–2 | 0–5 |
| Santa Clara (Portugal) | 2–3 | (Serbia) Partizan | 2–1 | 0–2 |
| Trabzonspor (Turkey) | 1–5 | (Italy) Roma | 1–2 | 0–3 |
| Hapoel Be'er Sheva (Israel) | 1–3 | (Cyprus) Anorthosis Famagusta | 0–0 | 1–3 |
| Jablonec (Czech Republic) | 8–1 | (Slovakia) Žilina | 5–1 | 3–0 |

== Group stage ==
Location of teams of the 2021–22 UEFA Europa Conference League group stage.
Brown: Group A; Red: Group B; Orange: Group C; Yellow: Group D;
Green: Group E; Blue: Group F; Purple: Group G; Pink: Group H.

The draw for the group stage was held on 27 August 2021, 13:30 CEST (14:30 TRT), in Istanbul, Turkey. The 32 teams were drawn into eight groups of four. For the draw, the teams were seeded into four pots, each of eight teams, based on their 2021 UEFA club coefficients. Teams from the same association, and due to political reasons, teams from Azerbaijan and Armenia, could not be drawn into the same group. Prior to the draw, UEFA formed pairings of teams from the same association, including those playing in the Europa League group stage (one pairing for associations with two or three teams, two pairings for associations with four or five teams), based on television audiences, where one team was drawn into Groups A–D and another team was drawn into Groups E–H, so that the two teams would have different kick-off times.

The matches were played on 14 and 16 September, 30 September, 21 October, 4 November, 25 November, and 9 December 2021. The winners of each group advanced to the round of 16, while the runners-up advanced to the knockout round play-offs. The third-placed and fourth-placed teams were eliminated from European competitions for the season.

All teams made their debut appearance in the group stage. Alashkert, Bodø/Glimt, Flora, Kairat, Lincoln Red Imps, Mura, Randers and Union Berlin made their debut appearances in a UEFA competition group stage. Alashkert, Flora and Lincoln Red Imps were the first teams from Armenia, Estonia and Gibraltar, respectively, to play in a UEFA competition group stage.

Location of Benelux teams of the 2021–22 UEFA Europa Conference League group stage.

=== Group A ===
| Pos | Team | Pld | W | D | L | GF | GA | GD | Pts | Qualification | LASK | MTA | HJK | ALA |
|---|---|---|---|---|---|---|---|---|---|---|---|---|---|---|
| 1 | (Austria) LASK | 6 | 5 | 1 | 0 | 12 | 1 | +11 | 16 | Advance to round of 16 | — | 1–1 | 3–0 | 2–0 |
| 2 | (Israel) Maccabi Tel Aviv | 6 | 3 | 2 | 1 | 14 | 4 | +10 | 11 | Advance to knockout round play-offs | 0–1 | — | 3–0 | 4–1 |
| 3 | (Finland) HJK | 6 | 2 | 0 | 4 | 5 | 15 | −10 | 6 | | 0–2 | 0–5 | — | 1–0 |
| 4 | (Armenia) Alashkert | 6 | 0 | 1 | 5 | 4 | 15 | −11 | 1 | | 0–3 | 1–1 | 2–4 | — |

Source: UEFA

=== Group B ===
| Pos | Team | Pld | W | D | L | GF | GA | GD | Pts | Qualification | GNT | PAR | ANO | FLO |
|---|---|---|---|---|---|---|---|---|---|---|---|---|---|---|
| 1 | (Belgium) Gent | 6 | 4 | 1 | 1 | 6 | 2 | +4 | 13 | Advance to round of 16 | — | 1–1 | 2–0 | 1–0 |
| 2 | (Serbia) Partizan | 6 | 2 | 2 | 2 | 6 | 4 | +2 | 8 | Advance to knockout round play-offs | 0–1 | — | 1–1 | 2–0 |
| 3 | (Cyprus) Anorthosis Famagusta | 6 | 1 | 3 | 2 | 6 | 9 | −3 | 6 | | 1–0 | 0–2 | — | 2–2 |
| 4 | (Estonia) Flora | 6 | 1 | 2 | 3 | 5 | 8 | −3 | 5 | | 0–1 | 1–0 | 2–2 | — |

Source: UEFA

=== Group C ===
| Pos | Team | Pld | W | D | L | GF | GA | GD | Pts | Qualification | ROM | BOD | ZOR | CSS |
|---|---|---|---|---|---|---|---|---|---|---|---|---|---|---|
| 1 | (Italy) Roma | 6 | 4 | 1 | 1 | 18 | 11 | +7 | 13 | Advance to round of 16 | — | 2–2 | 4–0 | 5–1 |
| 2 | (Norway) Bodø/Glimt | 6 | 3 | 3 | 0 | 14 | 5 | +9 | 12 | Advance to knockout round play-offs | 6–1 | — | 3–1 | 2–0 |
| 3 | (Ukraine) Zorya Luhansk | 6 | 2 | 1 | 3 | 5 | 11 | −6 | 7 | | 0–3 | 1–1 | — | 2–0 |
| 4 | (Bulgaria) CSKA Sofia | 6 | 0 | 1 | 5 | 3 | 13 | −10 | 1 | | 2–3 | 0–0 | 0–1 | — |

Source: UEFA

=== Group D ===
| Pos | Team | Pld | W | D | L | GF | GA | GD | Pts | Qualification | AZ | RAN | JAB | CLJ |
|---|---|---|---|---|---|---|---|---|---|---|---|---|---|---|
| 1 | (Netherlands) AZ | 6 | 4 | 2 | 0 | 8 | 3 | +5 | 14 | Advance to round of 16 | — | 1–0 | 1–0 | 2–0 |
| 2 | (Denmark) Randers | 6 | 1 | 4 | 1 | 9 | 9 | 0 | 7 | Advance to knockout round play-offs | 2–2 | — | 2–2 | 2–1 |
| 3 | (Czech Republic) Jablonec | 6 | 1 | 3 | 2 | 6 | 8 | −2 | 6 | | 1–1 | 2–2 | — | 1–0 |
| 4 | (Romania) CFR Cluj | 6 | 1 | 1 | 4 | 4 | 7 | −3 | 4 | | 0–1 | 1–1 | 2–0 | — |

Source: UEFA

=== Group E ===
| Pos | Team | Pld | W | D | L | GF | GA | GD | Pts | Qualification | FEY | SLA | UNI | MHA |
|---|---|---|---|---|---|---|---|---|---|---|---|---|---|---|
| 1 | (Netherlands) Feyenoord | 6 | 4 | 2 | 0 | 11 | 6 | +5 | 14 | Advance to round of 16 | — | 2–1 | 3–1 | 2–1 |
| 2 | (Czech Republic) Slavia Prague | 6 | 2 | 2 | 2 | 8 | 7 | +1 | 8 | Advance to knockout round play-offs | 2–2 | — | 3–1 | 1–0 |
| 3 | (Germany) Union Berlin | 6 | 2 | 1 | 3 | 8 | 9 | −1 | 7 | | 1–2 | 1–1 | — | 3–0 |
| 4 | (Israel) Maccabi Haifa | 6 | 1 | 1 | 4 | 2 | 7 | −5 | 4 | | 0–0 | 1–0 | 0–1 | — |

Source: UEFA

=== Group F ===
| Pos | Team | Pld | W | D | L | GF | GA | GD | Pts | Qualification | COP | PAO | SLO | LIN |
|---|---|---|---|---|---|---|---|---|---|---|---|---|---|---|
| 1 | (Denmark) Copenhagen | 6 | 5 | 0 | 1 | 15 | 5 | +10 | 15 | Advance to round of 16 | — | 1–2 | 2–0 | 3–1 |
| 2 | (Greece) PAOK | 6 | 3 | 2 | 1 | 8 | 4 | +4 | 11 | Advance to knockout round play-offs | 1–2 | — | 1–1 | 2–0 |
| 3 | (Slovakia) Slovan Bratislava | 6 | 2 | 2 | 2 | 8 | 7 | +1 | 8 | | 1–3 | 0–0 | — | 2–0 |
| 4 | (Gibraltar) Lincoln Red Imps | 6 | 0 | 0 | 6 | 2 | 17 | −15 | 0 | | 0–4 | 0–2 | 1–4 | — |

Source: UEFA

=== Group G ===
| Pos | Team | Pld | W | D | L | GF | GA | GD | Pts | Qualification | REN | VIT | TOT | MUR |
|---|---|---|---|---|---|---|---|---|---|---|---|---|---|---|
| 1 | (France) Rennes | 6 | 4 | 2 | 0 | 13 | 7 | +6 | 14 | Advance to round of 16 | — | 3–3 | 2–2 | 1–0 |
| 2 | (Netherlands) Vitesse | 6 | 3 | 1 | 2 | 12 | 9 | +3 | 10 | Advance to knockout round play-offs | 1–2 | — | 1–0 | 3–1 |
| 3 | (England) Tottenham Hotspur | 6 | 2 | 1 | 3 | 11 | 11 | 0 | 7 | | 0–3 (Note: The Tottenham Hotspur v Rennes match was awarded as a 3–0 win to Rennes due to numerous positive COVID-19 tests in the Tottenham Hotspur squad.) | 3–2 | — | 5–1 |
| 4 | (Slovenia) Mura | 6 | 1 | 0 | 5 | 5 | 14 | −9 | 3 | | 1–2 | 0–2 | 2–1 | — |

Source: UEFA

=== Group H ===
| Pos | Team | Pld | W | D | L | GF | GA | GD | Pts | Qualification | BAS | QAR | OMO | KAI |
|---|---|---|---|---|---|---|---|---|---|---|---|---|---|---|
| 1 | (Switzerland) Basel | 6 | 4 | 2 | 0 | 14 | 6 | +8 | 14 | Advance to round of 16 | — | 3–0 | 3–1 | 4–2 |
| 2 | (Azerbaijan) Qarabağ | 6 | 3 | 2 | 1 | 10 | 8 | +2 | 11 | Advance to knockout round play-offs | 0–0 | — | 2–2 | 2–1 |
| 3 | (Cyprus) Omonia | 6 | 0 | 4 | 2 | 5 | 10 | −5 | 4 | | 1–1 | 1–4 | — | 0–0 |
| 4 | (Kazakhstan) Kairat | 6 | 0 | 2 | 4 | 6 | 11 | −5 | 2 | | 2–3 | 1–2 | 0–0 | — |

Source: UEFA

== Knockout phase ==
In the knockout phase, teams played against each other over two legs on a home-and-away basis, except for the one-match final. The mechanism of the draws for each round was as follows:

- In the draw for the knockout round play-offs, the eight group runners-up were seeded, and the eight Europa League group third-placed teams were unseeded. The seeded teams were drawn against the unseeded teams, with the seeded teams hosting the second leg. Teams from the same association could not be drawn against each other. Since the identity of the Group G runners-up was not known at the time of the draw (due to the match between Tottenham Hotspur and Rennes not being played as scheduled), and could have been either Tottenham Hotspur or Vitesse, they could not be drawn against Leicester City or PSV Eindhoven.
- In the draw for the round of 16, the eight group winners were seeded, and the eight winners of the knockout round play-offs were unseeded. Again, the seeded teams were drawn against the unseeded teams, with the seeded teams hosting the second leg. Teams from the same association could not be drawn against each other.
- In the draws for the quarter-finals onwards, there were no seedings, and teams from the same association could be drawn against each other. As the draws for the quarter-finals and semi-finals were held together before the quarter-finals were played, the identity of the quarter-final winners was not known at the time of the semi-final draw. A draw was also held to determine which semi-final winner was designated as the "home" team for the final (for administrative purposes as it was played at a neutral venue).

=== Bracket ===
Knockout round play-offs
(England) Leicester City | 4 | 3 | 7
(Denmark) Randers | 1 | 1 | 2
(Netherlands) PSV Eindhoven | 1 | 1 | 2
(Israel) Maccabi Tel Aviv | 0 | 1 | 1
(Scotland) Celtic | 1 | 0 | 1
(Norway) Bodø/Glimt | 3 | 2 | 5
(Austria) Rapid Wien | 2 | 0 | 2
(Netherlands) Vitesse | 1 | 2 | 3
(Czech Republic) Sparta Prague | 0 | 1 | 1
(Serbia) Partizan | 1 | 2 | 3
(Turkey) Fenerbahçe | 2 | 2 | 4
(Czech Republic) Slavia Prague | 3 | 3 | 6
(France) Marseille | 3 | 3 | 6
(Azerbaijan) Qarabağ | 1 | 0 | 1
(Denmark) Midtjylland | 1 | 1 | 2 (3)
(Greece) PAOK (p) | 0 | 2 | 2 (5)

Round of 16
(England) Leicester City | 2 | 1 | 3
(France) Rennes | 0 | 2 | 2
(Netherlands) PSV Eindhoven | 4 | 4 | 8
(Denmark) Copenhagen | 4 | 0 | 4
(Norway) Bodø/Glimt (a.e.t.) | 2 | 2 | 4
(Netherlands) AZ | 1 | 2 | 3
(Netherlands) Vitesse | 0 | 1 | 1
(Italy) Roma | 1 | 1 | 2
(Serbia) Partizan | 2 | 1 | 3
(Netherlands) Feyenoord | 5 | 3 | 8
(Czech Republic) Slavia Prague | 4 | 3 | 7
(Austria) LASK | 1 | 4 | 5
(France) Marseille | 2 | 2 | 4
(Switzerland) Basel | 1 | 1 | 2
(Greece) PAOK | 1 | 2 | 3
(Belgium) Gent | 0 | 1 | 1

Quarter-finals
(England) Leicester City | 0 | 2 | 2
(Netherlands) PSV Eindhoven | 0 | 1 | 1
(Norway) Bodø/Glimt | 2 | 0 | 2
(Italy) Roma | 1 | 4 | 5
(Netherlands) Feyenoord | 3 | 3 | 6
(Czech Republic) Slavia Prague | 3 | 1 | 4
(France) Marseille | 2 | 1 | 3
(Greece) PAOK | 1 | 0 | 1

Semi-finals
(England) Leicester City | 1 | 0 | 1
(Italy) Roma | 1 | 1 | 2
(Netherlands) Feyenoord | 3 | 0 | 3
(France) Marseille | 2 | 0 | 2

Final
25 May – Tirana
(Italy) Roma | 1
(Netherlands) Feyenoord | 0

=== Knockout round play-offs ===
The draw for the knockout round play-offs was held on 13 December 2021, 14:00 CET. The first legs were played on 17 February, and the second legs were played on 24 February 2022.

| Team 1 | Agg. | Team 2 | 1st leg | 2nd leg |
|---|---|---|---|---|
| Marseille (France) | 6–1 | (Azerbaijan) Qarabağ | 3–1 | 3–0 |
| PSV Eindhoven (Netherlands) | 2–1 | (Israel) Maccabi Tel Aviv | 1–0 | 1–1 |
| Fenerbahçe (Turkey) | 4–6 | (Czech Republic) Slavia Prague | 2–3 | 2–3 |
| Midtjylland (Denmark) | 2–2 (3–5 p) | (Greece) PAOK | 1–0 | 1–2 (a.e.t.) |
| Leicester City (England) | 7–2 | (Denmark) Randers | 4–1 | 3–1 |
| Celtic (Scotland) | 1–5 | (Norway) Bodø/Glimt | 1–3 | 0–2 |
| Sparta Prague (Czech Republic) | 1–3 | (Serbia) Partizan | 0–1 | 1–2 |
| Rapid Wien (Austria) | 2–3 | (Netherlands) Vitesse | 2–1 | 0–2 |

=== Round of 16 ===
The draw for the round of 16 was held on 25 February 2022, 13:00 CET. The first legs were played on 10 March, and the second legs were played on 17 March 2022.

| Team 1 | Agg. | Team 2 | 1st leg | 2nd leg |
|---|---|---|---|---|
| Marseille (France) | 4–2 | (Switzerland) Basel | 2–1 | 2–1 |
| Leicester City (England) | 3–2 | (France) Rennes | 2–0 | 1–2 |
| PAOK (Greece) | 3–1 | (Belgium) Gent | 1–0 | 2–1 |
| Vitesse (Netherlands) | 1–2 | (Italy) Roma | 0–1 | 1–1 |
| PSV Eindhoven (Netherlands) | 8–4 | (Denmark) Copenhagen | 4–4 | 4–0 |
| Slavia Prague (Czech Republic) | 7–5 | (Austria) LASK | 4–1 | 3–4 |
| Bodø/Glimt (Norway) | 4–3 | (Netherlands) AZ | 2–1 | 2–2 (a.e.t.) |
| Partizan (Serbia) | 3–8 | (Netherlands) Feyenoord | 2–5 | 1–3 |

=== Quarter-finals ===
The draw for the quarter-finals was held on 18 March 2022, 15:00 CET. The first legs were played on 7 April, and the second legs were played on 14 April 2022.

| Team 1 | Agg. | Team 2 | 1st leg | 2nd leg |
|---|---|---|---|---|
| Bodø/Glimt (Norway) | 2–5 | (Italy) Roma | 2–1 | 0–4 |
| Feyenoord (Netherlands) | 6–4 | (Czech Republic) Slavia Prague | 3–3 | 3–1 |
| Marseille (France) | 3–1 | (Greece) PAOK | 2–1 | 1–0 |
| Leicester City (England) | 2–1 | (Netherlands) PSV Eindhoven | 0–0 | 2–1 |

=== Semi-finals ===
The draw for the semi-finals was held on 18 March 2022, 15:00 CET, after the quarter-final draw. The first legs were played on 28 April, and the second legs were played on 5 May 2022.

| Team 1 | Agg. | Team 2 | 1st leg | 2nd leg |
|---|---|---|---|---|
| Leicester City (England) | 1–2 | (Italy) Roma | 1–1 | 0–1 |
| Feyenoord (Netherlands) | 3–2 | (France) Marseille | 3–2 | 0–0 |

=== Final ===
The final was played on 25 May 2022 at the Arena Kombëtare in Tirana. A draw was held on 18 March 2022, after the quarter-final and semi-final draws, to determine the "home" team for administrative purposes.

25 May 2022
21:00 UTC+2

| Roma (Italy) | 1–0 | (Netherlands) Feyenoord |
|---|---|---|
| Zaniolo 32' | Report |

Arena Kombëtare, Tirana
Attendance: 19,597
Referee: István Kovács (Romania)

== Statistics ==
Statistics exclude qualifying rounds and play-off round.

=== Top goalscorers ===
| Rank | Player | Team | Goals | Minutes played |
|---|---|---|---|---|
| 1 | (Nigeria) Cyriel Dessers | (Netherlands) Feyenoord | 10 | 761 |
| 2 | (England) Tammy Abraham | (Italy) Roma | 9 | 919 |
| 3 | (Nigeria) Yira Sor | (Czech Republic) Slavia Prague | 6 | 509 |
| 3 | (Norway) Ola Solbakken | (Norway) Bodø/Glimt | 6 | 983 |
| 3 | (Colombia) Luis Sinisterra | (Netherlands) Feyenoord | 6 | 1016 |
| 6 | (France) Gaëtan Laborde | (France) Rennes | 5 | 463 |
| 6 | (Brazil) Arthur Cabral | (Switzerland) Basel | 5 | 492 |
| 6 | (Italy) Nicolò Zaniolo | (Italy) Roma | 5 | 601 |
| 6 | (Norway) Amahl Pellegrino | (Norway) Bodø/Glimt | 5 | 925 |

=== Team of the Season ===
The UEFA technical study group selected the following players as the team of the tournament.

| Pos. | Player | Team |
|---|---|---|
| GK | (Portugal) Rui Patrício | (Italy) Roma |
| DF | (Netherlands) Lutsharel Geertruida | (Netherlands) Feyenoord |
| DF | (England) Chris Smalling | (Italy) Roma |
| DF | (Austria) Gernot Trauner | (Netherlands) Feyenoord |
| DF | (Netherlands) Tyrell Malacia | (Netherlands) Feyenoord |
| MF | (Italy) Lorenzo Pellegrini | (Italy) Roma |
| MF | (France) Dimitri Payet | (France) Marseille |
| MF | (England) Kiernan Dewsbury-Hall | (England) Leicester City |
| MF | (Colombia) Luis Sinisterra | (Netherlands) Feyenoord |
| FW | (Nigeria) Cyriel Dessers | (Netherlands) Feyenoord |
| FW | (England) Tammy Abraham | (Italy) Roma |

=== Player of the Season ===
- (Italy) Lorenzo Pellegrini ( (Italy) Roma)

=== Young Player of the Season ===
- (Colombia) Luis Sinisterra ( (Netherlands) Feyenoord)

== See also ==
- 2021–22 UEFA Champions League
- 2021–22 UEFA Europa League
- 2021–22 UEFA Women's Champions League
- 2021–22 UEFA Youth League
