= 2020–21 Luxembourg National Division =

Luxembourg National Division
- Season: 2020–21
- Dates: 23 August 2020 – 30 May 2021
- Champions: Fola Esch
- Relegated: None
- Champions League: Fola Esch
- Conference League: F91 Dudelange; Swift Hesperange; Racing FC
- Matches: 240
- Goals: 739 (3.08 per match)

The 2020–21 Luxembourg National Division season was the 107th of top-tier association football in Luxembourg. The season began on 22 August 2020 and ended on 30 May 2021. The league winners qualified to participate in the 2021–22 UEFA Champions League.

== Teams ==
No teams were relegated at the end of the previous season. As a result, the league expanded to 16 teams. Swift Hesperange and Wiltz earned promotion from the Luxembourg Division of Honour and competed in the league this season.

Locations of the 2020–21 Luxembourg National Division teams

=== Stadia and locations ===
Team	Town	Venue	Capacity
Differdange 03	Differdange	Stade Municipal de la Ville de Differdange	3,000
Etzella Ettelbruck	Ettelbruck	Stade Am Deich	2,020
F91 Dudelange	Dudelange	Stade Jos Nosbaum	2,558
Fola Esch	Esch-sur-Alzette	Stade Émile Mayrisch	3,826
Hostert	Hostert	Stade Jos Becker	1,500
Jeunesse Esch	Esch-sur-Alzette	Stade de la Frontière	5,090
Mondorf-les-Bains	Mondorf-les-Bains	Stade John Grün	3,600
Progrès Niederkorn	Niederkorn	Stade Jos Haupert	2,800
Racing FC	Luxembourg City	Stade Achille Hammerel	5,814
RM Hamm Benfica	Hamm, Luxembourg City	Terrain de Football Cents	2,800
Rodange	Rodange	Stade Joseph Philippart	3,400
Swift Hesperange	Hesperange	Stade Alphonse Theis	3,058
UNA Strassen	Strassen	Complexe Sportif Jean Wirtz	2,000
UT Pétange	Pétange	Stade Municipal	2,400
Victoria Rosport	Rosport	VictoriArena	1,000
Wiltz	Wiltz	Stade Géitz	2,000

== League table ==
Pos	Team	Pld	W	D	L	GF	GA	GD	Pts	Qualification or relegation
1	Fola Esch (C)	30	21	5	4	89	35	+54	68	Qualification for the Champions League first qualifying round
2	F91 Dudelange	30	20	6	4	70	29	+41	66	Qualification for the Europa Conference League second qualifying round
3	Swift Hesperange	30	19	8	3	72	30	+42	65	Qualification for the Europa Conference League first qualifying round
4	Racing FC	30	17	3	10	47	29	+18	54	Qualification for the Europa Conference League first qualifying round
5	Progrès Niederkorn	30	15	8	7	48	30	+18	53	
6	Differdange 03	30	13	6	11	51	48	+3	45	
7	Wiltz	30	13	5	12	45	42	+3	44	
8	Jeunesse Esch	30	12	7	11	41	43	−2	43	
9	Hostert	30	9	10	11	47	56	−9	37	
10	UNA Strassen	30	9	8	13	44	65	−21	35	
11	Mondorf-les-Bains	30	7	7	16	33	56	−23	28	
12	Rodange 91	30	6	10	14	27	52	−25	28	
13	Victoria Rosport	30	8	3	19	37	67	−30	27	
14	RM Hamm Benfica	30	5	11	14	33	48	−15	26	
15	Etzella Ettelbruck	30	5	9	16	32	57	−25	24	
16	Union Titus Pétange	30	5	6	19	23	52	−29	21	

Source: UEFA, Soccerway
Rules for classification: 1) Points; 2) Goal difference; 3) Matches won; 4) Head-to-head points; 5) Head-to-head goal difference; 6) Head-to-head goals scored; 7) Play-off.
(C) Champions

== Results ==
Each team played every other team in the league twice, for a total of 30 matches each.

Home \ Away	DIF	ETZ	DUD	FOL	HOS	JEU	MON	PRO	RAC	RMH	ROD	SWI	UNA	UTP	VIC	WIL
Differdange 03	—	3–0	1–0	1–4	0–1	1–2	1–4	0–3	2–1	3–0	1–0	3–1	1–1	2–2	2–3	1–1
Etzella Ettelbruck	0–3	—	0–3	3–2	2–2	1–1	0–1	0–1	0–2	2–1	1–1	0–0	2–4	2–2	4–0	1–3
F91 Dudelange	3–1	3–0	—	2–0	1–1	0–0	3–0	1–0	1–1	4–3	5–1	2–3	1–1	3–0	2–0	3–3
Fola Esch	5–0	3–0	5–0	—	5–2	1–1	2–3	4–3	3–2	4–0	4–1	2–2	4–1	4–0	2–0	5–0
Hostert	4–5	3–0	2–1	3–3	—	1–1	4–4	0–3	0–5	0–3	3–3	0–3	2–4	2–0	3–1	1–2
Jeunesse Esch	1–4	1–1	1–5	0–3	1–0	—	2–1	2–2	0–1	1–0	2–1	1–3	3–0	4–0	1–0	1–1
Mondorf-les-Bains	1–3	2–3	0–3	1–2	1–1	2–3	—	0–1	3–2	0–0	0–0	1–1	1–4	0–1	2–2	0–3
Progrès Niederkorn	1–1	3–1	1–2	1–1	0–0	2–0	1–0	—	2–0	4–1	1–1	2–5	2–1	3–2	3–2	2–0
Racing FC	3–0	3–1	1–2	1–3	0–2	1–0	1–0	0–0	—	3–0	0–0	0–2	2–1	1–0	0–3	1–0
RM Hamm Benfica	1–1	1–1	1–2	0–2	0–1	1–0	0–2	0–0	0–1	—	3–2	1–1	1–2	1–1	5–0	1–1
Rodange 91	1–3	1–0	0–3	2–1	1–1	2–1	0–0	0–2	0–4	1–2	—	1–2	1–1	1–0	2–2	1–0
Swift Hesperange	3–1	5–2	1–2	2–2	2–0	5–1	2–1	1–1	1–2	1–1	4–0	—	7–0	1–0	1–0	4–2
UNA Strassen	1–1	1–1	2–6	1–4	3–2	0–5	3–0	0–4	2–1	1–1	1–1	2–2	—	4–1	1–3	2–0
Union Titus Pétange	0–2	0–2	0–3	1–2	1–1	1–2	0–1	1–0	0–5	0–0	0–1	0–1	2–0	—	2–0	5–1
Victoria Rosport	3–2	0–3	0–4	1–5	0–3	2–3	3–4	1–0	1–2	2–2	3–1	0–4	2–0	3–0	—	0–2
Wiltz	0–2	2–1	0–0	1–2	1–2	1–0	5–0	3–0	0–1	5–3	2–0	0–2	2–0	2–1	2–0	—

Source: Soccerway
Legend: Blue = home team win; Yellow = draw; Red = away team win.

== See also ==
- Luxembourg Cup
- Luxembourg Division of Honour
