= 2021–22 UEFA Europa Conference League qualifying (third and play-off round matches) =

European football competition

This page summarises the matches of the third qualifying and play-off rounds of 2021–22 UEFA Europa Conference League qualifying.

Times are CEST (UTC+2), as listed by UEFA (local times, if different, are in parentheses).

== Third qualifying round ==
=== Summary ===
The first legs were played on 3 and 5 August, and the second legs were played on 10 and 12 August 2021.

The winners of the ties advanced to the play-off round of their respective path. The losers were eliminated from European competitions for the season.

Team 1	Agg.	Team 2	1st leg	2nd leg
Champions Path
Maccabi Haifa (Israel)	7–3	(Faroe Islands) HB	7–2	0–1
Linfield (Northern Ireland)	2–4	(Luxembourg) Fola Esch	1–2	1–2
Shamrock Rovers (Republic of Ireland)	3–0	(Albania) Teuta	1–0	2–0
Riga (Latvia)	4–2	(Malta) Hibernians	0–1	4–1 (a.e.t.)
Prishtina (Kosovo)	2–3	(Norway) Bodø/Glimt	2–1	0–2
Main Path
Dinamo Batumi (Georgia (country))	2–3	(Turkey) Sivasspor	1–2	1–1 (a.e.t.)
KuPS (Finland)	5–4	(Kazakhstan) Astana	1–1	4–3
Sochi (Russia)	3–3 (2–4 p)	(Serbia) Partizan	1–1	2–2 (a.e.t.)
Śląsk Wrocław (Poland)	2–5	(Israel) Hapoel Be'er Sheva	2–1	0–4
Santa Clara (Portugal)	3–0	(Slovenia) Olimpija Ljubljana	2–0	1–0
Újpest (Hungary)	1–6	(Switzerland) Basel	1–2	0–4
IF Elfsborg (Sweden)	5–2	(Bosnia and Herzegovina) Velež Mostar	1–1	4–1
Kolos Kovalivka (Ukraine)	0–0 (1–3 p)	(Kazakhstan) Shakhter Karagandy	0–0	0–0 (a.e.t.)
Paços de Ferreira (Portugal)	4–1	(Northern Ireland) Larne	4–0	0–1
Luzern (Switzerland)	0–6	(Netherlands) Feyenoord	0–3	0–3
Gent (Belgium)	3–2	(Latvia) RFS	2–2	1–0
Hibernian (Scotland)	2–5	(Croatia) Rijeka	1–1	1–4
Breiðablik (Iceland)	3–5	(Scotland) Aberdeen	2–3	1–2
Trabzonspor (Turkey)	4–4 (4–3 p)	(Norway) Molde	3–3	1–1 (a.e.t.)
Bohemians (Republic of Ireland)	2–3	(Greece) PAOK	2–1	0–2
The New Saints (Wales)	5–5 (1–4 p)	(Czech Republic) Viktoria Plzeň	4–2	1–3 (a.e.t.)
Raków Częstochowa (Poland)	1–0	(Russia) Rubin Kazan	0–0	1–0 (a.e.t.)
Lokomotiv Plovdiv (Bulgaria)	3–5	(Denmark) Copenhagen	1–1	2–4
Čukarički (Serbia)	4–6	(Sweden) Hammarby IF	3–1	1–5
Tobol (Kazakhstan)	0–6	(Slovakia) Žilina	0–1	0–5
CSKA Sofia (Bulgaria)	5–3	(Croatia) Osijek	4–2	1–1
Vojvodina (Serbia)	1–7	(Austria) LASK	0–1	1–6
AEL Limassol (Cyprus)	1–2	(Azerbaijan) Qarabağ	1–1	0–1
Spartak Trnava (Slovakia)	0–1	(Israel) Maccabi Tel Aviv	0–0	0–1
Rosenborg (Norway)	8–2	(Slovenia) Domžale	6–1	2–1
Laçi (Albania)	1–5	(Belgium) Anderlecht	0–3	1–2
Vitesse (Netherlands)	4–3	(Republic of Ireland) Dundalk	2–2	2–1

=== Champions Path matches ===
5 August 2021
19:00 (20:00 UTC+3)

Maccabi Haifa (Israel)	7–2	(Faroe Islands) HB
David 6', 24'; Haziza 45+5'; Gershon 62'; Sahar 74'; Atzili 82'; Ashkenazi 90+2'	Report	Dahl 29'; Johansen 70' (pen.)

Sammy Ofer Stadium, Haifa
Attendance: 15,200
Referee: Erik Lambrechts (Belgium)
12 August 2021
20:45 (19:45 UTC+1)

HB (Faroe Islands)	1–0	(Israel) Maccabi Haifa
Przybylski 20'	Report

Gundadalur, Tórshavn
Attendance: 417
Referee: Horatiu Fesnic (Romania)

Maccabi Haifa won 7–3 on aggregate.

3 August 2021
18:45 (17:45 UTC+1)

Linfield (Northern Ireland)	1–2	(Luxembourg) Fola Esch
Chadwick 9'	Report	Bensi 69'; Caron 89'

Windsor Park, Belfast
Attendance: 2,227
Referee: Aleksandrs Anufrijevs (Latvia)
12 August 2021
19:30

Fola Esch (Luxembourg)	2–1	(Northern Ireland) Linfield
B. Correia 69'; Parreira 90+3' (pen.)	Report	Roscoe 90'

Stade Josy Barthel, Luxembourg City (Note: Fola Esch played their third qualifying round and play-off round home matches at Stade Josy Barthel, Luxembourg City, instead of their regular stadium Stade Émile Mayrisch, Esch-sur-Alzette, which did not meet UEFA requirements.)
Attendance: 730
Referee: Aliyar Aghayev (Azerbaijan)

Fola Esch won 4–2 on aggregate.

5 August 2021
21:00 (20:00 UTC+1)

Shamrock Rovers (Republic of Ireland)	1–0	(Albania) Teuta
Emakhu 90+1'	Report

Tallaght Stadium, Tallaght
Attendance: 1,500
Referee: Kai Erik Steen (Norway)
12 August 2021
20:00

Teuta (Albania)	0–2	(Republic of Ireland) Shamrock Rovers
	Report	Gaffney 20', 62'

Elbasan Arena, Elbasan (Note: Teuta played their third qualifying round home match at Elbasan Arena, Elbasan, instead of their regular stadium Niko Dovana Stadium, Durrës, which did not meet UEFA requirements.)
Attendance: 300
Referee: Petri Viljanen (Finland)

Shamrock Rovers won 3–0 on aggregate.

5 August 2021
19:00 (20:00 UTC+3)

Riga (Latvia)	0–1	(Malta) Hibernians
	Report	Agius 69'

Daugava Stadium, Riga (Note: Riga played their third qualifying round home match at Daugava Stadium, Riga, instead of their regular Skonto Stadium, Riga.)
Attendance: 778
Referee: Volen Chinkov (Bulgaria)
12 August 2021
20:00

Hibernians (Malta)	1–4 (a.e.t.)	(Latvia) Riga
Degabriele 60'	Report	Léo 49'; Paurević 90+6'; Muritala 105+3', 115'

Centenary Stadium, Ta'Qali
Attendance: 330
Referee: Rob Hennessy (Republic of Ireland)

Riga won 4–2 on aggregate.

5 August 2021
20:00

Prishtina (Kosovo)	2–1	(Norway) Bodø/Glimt
Otto John 44'; Lode 82' (o.g.)	Report	Berg 11'

Fadil Vokrri Stadium, Pristina
Attendance: 2,912
Referee: Timotheos Christofi (Cyprus)
12 August 2021
18:00

Bodø/Glimt (Norway)	2–0	(Kosovo) Prishtina
Botheim 18', 78'	Report

Aspmyra Stadion, Bodø
Attendance: 2,000
Referee: Kári Á Høvdanum (Faroe Islands)

Bodø/Glimt won 3–2 on aggregate.

=== Main Path matches ===
5 August 2021
19:00 (21:00 UTC+4)

Dinamo Batumi (Georgia (country))	1–2	(Turkey) Sivasspor
Mamuchashvili 54'	Report	James 75'; Kayode 90+5'

Batumi Stadium, Batumi
Attendance: 12,250
Referee: Irfan Peljto (Bosnia and Herzegovina)
12 August 2021
20:00 (21:00 UTC+3)

Sivasspor (Turkey)	1–1 (a.e.t.)	(Georgia (country)) Dinamo Batumi
Félix 109'	Report	Pantsulaia 78'

Sivas Stadium, Sivas
Attendance: 7,920
Referee: Ricardo de Burgos (Spain)

Sivasspor won 3–2 on aggregate.

5 August 2021
18:00 (19:00 UTC+3)

KuPS (Finland)	1–1	(Kazakhstan) Astana
Udo 54'	Report	Bitri 90+4'

Helsinki Olympic Stadium, Helsinki (Note: KuPS played their third qualifying round and play-off round home matches at Helsinki Olympic Stadium, Helsinki, instead of their regular stadium Kuopio Football Stadium, Kuopio, which did not meet UEFA requirements.)
Attendance: 1,732
Referee: Adrien Jaccottet (Switzerland)
12 August 2021
15:00 (19:00 UTC+6)

Astana (Kazakhstan)	3–4	(Finland) KuPS
Barseghyan 4', 58'; Aymbetov 41'	Report	Rangel 53', 61', 74'; Ikaunieks 77'

Astana Arena, Nur-Sultan
Attendance: 0 (Note: Due to the COVID-19 pandemic in Europe, the match was played behind closed doors.)
Referee: Nikola Dabanović (Montenegro)

KuPS won 5–4 on aggregate.

5 August 2021
18:00 (19:00 UTC+3)

Sochi (Russia)	1–1	(Serbia) Partizan
Noboa 66' (pen.)	Report	Ricardo 73'

Fisht Olympic Stadium, Sochi
Attendance: 308
Referee: Dumitri Muntean (Moldova)
12 August 2021
21:00

Partizan (Serbia)	2–2 (a.e.t.)	(Russia) Sochi
Jojić 55'; Šćekić 90'	Report	Terekhov 33', 76'
Penalties
Živković (penalty scored); Ricardo (penalty scored); Soumah (penalty scored); Vujačić (penalty scored)	4–2	(penalty missed) Tsallagov; (penalty scored) Vorobyev; (penalty scored) Joãozinho; (penalty missed) Rodrigão

Partizan Stadium, Belgrade
Attendance: 13,131
Referee: Jakob Kehlet (Denmark)

3–3 on aggregate; Partizan won 4–2 on penalties.

5 August 2021
20:00

Śląsk Wrocław (Poland)	2–1	(Israel) Hapoel Be'er Sheva
Expósito 28'; Pich 45+17' (pen.)	Report	Bareiro 45+5'

Stadion Wrocław, Wrocław
Attendance: 11,609
Referee: Pavel Orel (Czech Republic)
12 August 2021
19:00 (20:00 UTC+3)

Hapoel Be'er Sheva (Israel)	4–0	(Poland) Śląsk Wrocław
Ansah 2', 54'; Safouri 7'; Shviro 82'	Report

HaMoshava Stadium, Petah Tikva (Note: Hapoel Be'er Sheva played their second and third qualifying home matches rounds at HaMoshava Stadium, Petah Tikva, instead of their regular stadium Turner Stadium, Be'er Sheva, due to renovation.)
Attendance: 5,109
Referee: Ruddy Buquet (France)

Hapoel Be'er Sheva won 5–2 on aggregate.

5 August 2021
22:30 (20:30 UTC+0)

Santa Clara (Portugal)	2–0	(Slovenia) Olimpija Ljubljana
Carlos 14'; Mansur 45+2'	Report

Estádio de São Miguel, Ponta Delgada
Attendance: 947
Referee: Harald Lechner (Austria)
12 August 2021
20:00

Olimpija Ljubljana (Slovenia)	0–1	(Portugal) Santa Clara
	Report	Rui Costa 73'

Stožice Stadium, Ljubljana
Attendance: 1,500
Referee: Ali Palabıyık (Turkey)

Santa Clara won 3–0 on aggregate.

5 August 2021
21:00

Újpest (Hungary)	1–2	(Switzerland) Basel
Croizet 40'	Report	Cabral 55'; Males 74'

Szusza Ferenc Stadion, Budapest
Attendance: 2,367
Referee: Jérôme Brisard (France)
12 August 2021
19:30

Basel (Switzerland)	4–0	(Hungary) Újpest
Males 22'; Stocker 45+2'; Cabral 71'; Petretta 90'	Report

St. Jakob-Park, Basel
Attendance: 12,337
Referee: Yigal Frid (Israel)

Basel won 6–1 on aggregate.

5 August 2021
18:45

IF Elfsborg (Sweden)	1–1	(Bosnia and Herzegovina) Velež Mostar
Frick 34'	Report	Radović 32'

Borås Arena, Borås
Attendance: 2,557
Referee: Pawel Gil (Poland)
12 August 2021
20:00

Velež Mostar (Bosnia and Herzegovina)	1–4	(Sweden) IF Elfsborg
Georgijević 81'	Report	Frick 3', 52'; Okkels 16', 48'

Stadion Grbavica, Sarajevo (Note: Velež Mostar played their home matches at Stadion Grbavica, Sarajevo, instead of their regular stadium Stadion Rođeni, Mostar, which did not meet UEFA requirements.)
Attendance: 9,735
Referee: Filip Glova (Slovakia)

IF Elfsborg won 5–2 on aggregate.

5 August 2021
20:00 (21:00 UTC+3)

Kolos Kovalivka (Ukraine)	0–0	(Kazakhstan) Shakhter Karagandy
	Report

Kolos Stadium, Kovalivka
Attendance: 3,298
Referee: Peter Kjaesgaard (Denmark)
10 August 2021
16:00 (20:00 UTC+6)

Shakhter Karagandy (Kazakhstan)	0–0 (a.e.t.)	(Ukraine) Kolos Kovalivka
	Report
Penalties
Rustemović (penalty scored); Bukorac (penalty scored); Graf (penalty scored)	3–1	(penalty missed) Nuriyev; (penalty scored) Chornomorets; (penalty missed) Churko; (penalty missed) Pavlovets

Astana Arena, Nur-Sultan (Note: Shakhter Karagandy played their home matches at Astana Arena, Nur-Sultan, instead of their regular stadium Shakhter Stadium, Karagandy, which did not meet UEFA requirements.)
Attendance: 0
Referee: Halis Özkahya (Turkey)

0–0 on aggregate; Shakhter Karagandy won 3–1 on penalties.

5 August 2021
20:00 (19:00 UTC+1)

Paços de Ferreira (Portugal)	4–0	(Northern Ireland) Larne
Denílson 44', 70'; Eustáquio 73'; Zé Uilton 90'	Report

Estádio Capital do Móvel, Paços de Ferreira
Attendance: 1,577
Referee: Matej Jug (Slovenia)
12 August 2021
20:30 (19:30 UTC+1)

Larne (Northern Ireland)	1–0	(Portugal) Paços de Ferreira
Randall 83'	Report

Inver Park, Larne
Attendance: 1,150
Referee: Fran Jović (Croatia)

Paços de Ferreira won 4–1 on aggregate.

5 August 2021
20:30

Luzern (Switzerland)	0–3	(Netherlands) Feyenoord
	Report	Til 9', 39'; Sinisterra 84'

Swissporarena, Lucerne
Attendance: 5,069
Referee: Alejandro Hernández (Spain)
12 August 2021
20:00

Feyenoord (Netherlands)	3–0	(Switzerland) Luzern
Jahanbakhsh 9', 34'; Sinisterra 48'	Report

De Kuip, Rotterdam
Attendance: 32,087
Referee: Marco Guida (Italy)

Feyenoord won 6–0 on aggregate.

5 August 2021
20:30

Gent (Belgium)	2–2	(Latvia) RFS
Oladoye 52'; Tissoudali 77'	Report	Lemajić 11'; Šimkovič 28'

Ghelamco Arena, Ghent
Attendance: 3,887
Referee: Mohammed Al-Hakim (Sweden)
12 August 2021
19:00 (20:00 UTC+3)

RFS (Latvia)	0–1	(Belgium) Gent
	Report	Okumu 73'

Slokas Stadium, Jūrmala (Note: RFS played their home matches at Slokas Stadium, Jūrmala, instead of their regular stadium Stadions Arkādija, Riga, which did not meet UEFA requirements.)
Attendance: 1,507
Referee: Rade Obrenovič (Slovenia)

Gent won 3–2 on aggregate.

5 August 2021
20:45 (19:45 UTC+1)

Hibernian (Scotland)	1–1	(Croatia) Rijeka
Boyle 67'	Report	Ampem 61'

Easter Road, Edinburgh
Attendance: 5,600
Referee: Juan Martínez Munuera (Spain)
12 August 2021
20:00

Rijeka (Croatia)	4–1	(Scotland) Hibernian
Pavičić 36'; Issah 68'; McGinn 73' (o.g.); Bušnja 90+3'	Report	Magennis 56'

Stadion Rujevica, Rijeka
Attendance: 4,077
Referee: Donatas Rumšas (Lithuania)

Rijeka won 5–2 on aggregate.

5 August 2021
21:00 (19:00 UTC+0)

Breiðablik (Iceland)	2–3	(Scotland) Aberdeen
Eyjólfsson 16'; Vilhjálmsson 43' (pen.)	Report	Ramirez 3', 49'; Ferguson 11'

Laugardalsvöllur, Reykjavík
Attendance: 1,197
Referee: Ivan Bebek (Croatia)
12 August 2021
20:45 (19:45 UTC+1)

Aberdeen (Scotland)	2–1	(Iceland) Breiðablik
Hedges 47', 71'	Report	Eyjólfsson 59'

Pittodrie Stadium, Aberdeen
Attendance: 15,107
Referee: Marco Di Bello (Italy)

Aberdeen won 5–3 on aggregate.

5 August 2021
19:30 (20:30 UTC+3)

Trabzonspor (Turkey)	3–3	(Norway) Molde
Nwakaeme 15'; Hugo 58'; Djaniny 74'	Report	Brynhildsen 31', 64'; Hussain 85'

Şenol Güneş Stadium, Trabzon
Attendance: 12,415
Referee: Harm Osmers (Germany)
12 August 2021
18:00

Molde (Norway)	1–1 (a.e.t.)	(Turkey) Trabzonspor
Sigurðarson 90+7'	Report	Ié 57'
Penalties
Andersen (penalty missed); Grødem (penalty scored); Sigurðarson (penalty scored); Fofana (penalty missed); Risa (penalty scored)	3–4	(penalty scored) Bakasetas; (penalty scored) Peres; (penalty scored) Özdemir; (penalty missed) Ié; (penalty scored) Trondsen

Aker Stadion, Molde
Attendance: 2,792
Referee: Fábio Veríssimo (Portugal)

4–4 on aggregate; Trabzonspor won 4–3 on penalties.

3 August 2021
18:45 (17:45 UTC+1)

Bohemians (Republic of Ireland)	2–1	(Greece) PAOK
Coote 23', 52'	Report	Oliveira 78'

Aviva Stadium, Dublin (Note: Bohemians played their home matches at Aviva Stadium, Dublin, instead of their regular stadium Dalymount Park, Dublin, which did not meet UEFA requirements.)
Attendance: 6,500
Referee: Antti Munukka (Finland)
12 August 2021
19:00 (20:00 UTC+3)

PAOK (Greece)	2–0	(Republic of Ireland) Bohemians
Schwab 4'; Biseswar 28'	Report

Toumba Stadium, Thessaloniki
Attendance: 0
Referee: Julian Weinberger (Austria)

PAOK won 3–2 on aggregate.

5 August 2021
20:45 (19:45 UTC+1)

The New Saints (Wales)	4–2	(Czech Republic) Viktoria Plzeň
Hudson 19'; McManus 30' (pen.), 54' (pen.), 76'	Report	Beauguel 89'; Ba Loua 90+5'

Cardiff City Stadium, Cardiff (Note: The New Saints played their Third Qualifying Round match at Cardiff City Stadium, instead of their regular stadium Park Hall, Oswestry due to UEFA requirements.)
Attendance: 345
Referee: Juri Frischer (Estonia)
12 August 2021
19:00

Viktoria Plzeň (Czech Republic)	3–1 (a.e.t.)	(Wales) The New Saints
Bucha 56'; Chorý 85'; Beauguel 90+1'	Report	Robles 4'
Penalties
Beauguel (penalty scored); Bucha (penalty scored); Chorý (penalty scored); Káčer (penalty scored)	4–1	(penalty missed) Marriott; (penalty missed) Smith; (penalty scored) Redmond

Doosan Arena, Plzeň
Attendance: 6,079
Referee: Sascha Stegemann (Germany)

5–5 on aggregate; Viktoria Plzeň won 4–1 on penalties.

5 August 2021
21:00

Raków Częstochowa (Poland)	0–0	(Russia) Rubin Kazan
	Report

BBOSiR Stadium, Bielsko-Biała (Note: Raków Częstochowa played their home matches at BBOSiR stadium in Bielsko Biała, instead of their regular stadium Miejski Stadion Piłkarski "Raków", Częstochowa, which did not meet UEFA requirements.)
Attendance: 4,811
Referee: João Pinheiro (Portugal)
12 August 2021
18:00 (19:00 UTC+3)

Rubin Kazan (Russia)	0–1 (a.e.t.)	(Poland) Raków Częstochowa
	Report	Gutkovskis 111'

Ak Bars Arena, Kazan
Attendance: 11,754
Referee: Tamás Bognár (Hungary)

Raków Częstochowa won 1–0 on aggregate.

5 August 2021
18:00 (19:00 UTC+3)

Lokomotiv Plovdiv (Bulgaria)	1–1	(Denmark) Copenhagen
Iliev 60' (pen.)	Report	Biel 74'

Stadion Lokomotiv, Plovdiv
Attendance: 3,253
Referee: Nicholas Walsh (Scotland)
12 August 2021
20:00

Copenhagen (Denmark)	4–2	(Bulgaria) Lokomotiv Plovdiv
Diks 11', 20'; Biel 40'; Daramy 48'	Report	Iliev 30'; Salinas 86'

Parken Stadium, Copenhagen
Attendance: 12,633
Referee: Duje Strukan (Croatia)

Copenhagen won 5–3 on aggregate.

5 August 2021
21:00

Čukarički (Serbia)	3–1	(Sweden) Hammarby IF
Jovanović 22'; Docić 40', 53'	Report	Ludwigson 25'

Partizan Stadium, Belgrade (Note: Čukarički played their home match at Partizan stadium in Belgrade, instead of their regular stadium Čukarički Stadium, Belgrade, which did not meet UEFA requirements.)
Attendance: 1,496
Referee: Yevhenii Aranovskiy (Ukraine)
12 August 2021
18:45

Hammarby IF (Sweden)	5–1	(Serbia) Čukarički
Jeahze 12'; Selmani 26', 72'; Paulsen 44'; Swedberg 67'	Report	N'Diaye 64'

Tele2 Arena, Stockholm
Attendance: 7,651
Referee: Dennis Higler (Netherlands)

Hammarby IF won 6–4 on aggregate.

5 August 2021
18:00 (22:00 UTC+6)

Tobol (Kazakhstan)	0–1	(Slovakia) Žilina
	Report	Gono 27'

Astana Arena, Nur-Sultan (Note: Tobol played their third qualifying round home match at Astana Arena, Nur-Sultan, instead of their regular stadium Kostanay Central Stadium, Kostanay, which did not meet UEFA requirements.)
Attendance: 0
Referee: Sergei Ivanov (Russia)
12 August 2021
18:45

Žilina (Slovakia)	5–0	(Kazakhstan) Tobol
Ďuriš 14'; Rusnák 41'; Bichakhchyan 64', 90+1'; Slebodník 81'	Report

Štadión pod Dubňom, Žilina
Attendance: 2,227
Referee: John Beaton (Scotland)

Žilina won 6–0 on aggregate.

5 August 2021
19:00 (20:00 UTC+3)

CSKA Sofia (Bulgaria)	4–2	(Croatia) Osijek
Mazikou 30'; Carey 39'; Caicedo 42'; Yomov 74'	Report	Mattheij 41' (o.g.); Topčagić 90+3'

Vasil Levski National Stadium, Sofia (Note: CSKA Sofia played their third qualifying round and play-off round home matches at Vasil Levski National Stadium, Sofia, instead of their regular stadium Stadion Balgarska Armia, Sofia.)
Attendance: 4,494
Referee: Donatas Rumšas (Lithuania)
12 August 2021
21:15

Osijek (Croatia)	1–1	(Bulgaria) CSKA Sofia
Škorić 45'	Report	Carey 33'

Gradski Vrt Stadium, Osijek
Attendance: 3,706
Referee: Donald Robertson (Scotland)

CSKA Sofia won 5–3 on aggregate.

5 August 2021
19:00

Vojvodina (Serbia)	0–1	(Austria) LASK
	Report	Michorl 70'

Karađorđe Stadium, Novi Sad
Attendance: 2,126
Referee: Michael Fabbri (Italy)
12 August 2021
21:00

LASK (Austria)	6–1	(Serbia) Vojvodina
Karamoko 34' (pen.), 53'; Goiginger 56'; Potzmann 67'; Balić 80'; Schmidt 87'	Report	Kabić 13'

Wörthersee Stadion, Klagenfurt (Note: LASK played their home matches at Wörthersee Stadion, Klagenfurt, instead of their regular stadium Linzer Stadion, Linz, due to renovation.)
Attendance: 769
Referee: Benoît Millot (France)

LASK won 7–1 on aggregate.

5 August 2021
19:00 (20:00 UTC+3)

AEL Limassol (Cyprus)	1–1	(Azerbaijan) Qarabağ
Šćepović 69' (pen.)	Report	Zoubir 90+3'

AEK Arena, Larnaca (Note: AEL Limassol played their third qualifying round home match at AEK Arena – Georgios Karapatakis, Larnaca, instead of their regular stadium Tsirio Stadium, Limassol, which did not meet UEFA requirements.)
Attendance: 1,833
Referee: Glenn Nyberg (Sweden)
12 August 2021
18:00 (20:00 UTC+4)

Qarabağ (Azerbaijan)	1–0	(Cyprus) AEL Limassol
Kady 87'	Report

Tofiq Bahramov Republican Stadium, Baku
Attendance: 12,251
Referee: Kristo Tohver (Estonia)

Qarabağ won 2–1 on aggregate.

5 August 2021
20:15

Spartak Trnava (Slovakia)	0–0	(Israel) Maccabi Tel Aviv
	Report

Anton Malatinský Stadium, Trnava
Attendance: 700
Referee: Kirill Levnikov (Russia)
12 August 2021
19:30 (20:30 UTC+3)

Maccabi Tel Aviv (Israel)	1–0	(Slovakia) Spartak Trnava
Yeini 13'	Report

Bloomfield Stadium, Tel Aviv
Attendance: 9,972
Referee: Trustin Farrugia Cann (Malta)

Maccabi Tel Aviv won 1–0 on aggregate.

5 August 2021
19:00

Rosenborg (Norway)	6–1	(Slovenia) Domžale
Andersson 7'; Islamović 23', 46'; Karić 34' (o.g.); Reitan 40'; Holm 86'	Report	Alić 44'

Lerkendal Stadion, Trondheim
Attendance: 2,575
Referee: Serhiy Boyko (Ukraine)
10 August 2021
20:00

Domžale (Slovenia)	1–2	(Norway) Rosenborg
Podlogar 34'	Report	Holm 48'; Vecchia 86'

Stožice Stadium, Ljubljana (Note: Domžale played their home match at Stožice Stadium in Ljubljana, instead of their regular stadium Domžale Sports Park, Domžale, which did not meet UEFA requirements.)
Attendance: 758
Referee: Fabio Maresca (Italy)

Rosenborg won 8–2 on aggregate.

5 August 2021
19:00

Laçi (Albania)	0–3	(Belgium) Anderlecht
	Report	Delcroix 27'; Hoedt 42'; Refaelov 61'

Elbasan Arena, Elbasan (Note: Laçi played their home matches at Elbasan Arena, Elbasan, instead of their regular stadium Laçi Stadium, Laç, which did not meet UEFA requirements.)
Attendance: 800
Referee: José María Sánchez (Spain)
12 August 2021
20:00

Anderlecht (Belgium)	2–1	(Albania) Laçi
Amuzu 32'; Verschaeren 71'	Report	Lushkja 84'

Constant Vanden Stock Stadium, Brussels
Attendance: 4,256
Referee: Stuart Attwell (England)

Anderlecht won 5–1 on aggregate.

5 August 2021
19:00

Vitesse (Netherlands)	2–2	(Republic of Ireland) Dundalk
Bero 20'; Openda 89'	Report	McEleney 65', 76'

GelreDome, Arnhem
Attendance: 8,756
Referee: Anastasios Papapetrou (Greece)
12 August 2021
21:00 (20:00 UTC+1)

Dundalk (Republic of Ireland)	1–2	(Netherlands) Vitesse
Hoban 71' (pen.)	Report	Bero 28'; Gboho 38'

Tallaght Stadium, Tallaght (Note: Dundalk played their home match at Tallaght Stadium, Tallaght, instead of their regular stadium Oriel Park, Dundalk, which did not meet UEFA requirements.)
Attendance: 1,475
Referee: Alain Durieux (Luxembourg)

Vitesse won 4–3 on aggregate.

== Play-off round ==
=== Summary ===
The first legs were played on 19 August, and the second legs were played on 26 August 2021.

The winners of the ties advanced to the group stage. The losers were eliminated from European competitions for the season.

Team 1	Agg.	Team 2	1st leg	2nd leg
Champions Path
Žalgiris (Lithuania)	2–3	(Norway) Bodø/Glimt	2–2	0–1
Neftçi (Azerbaijan)	3–7	(Israel) Maccabi Haifa	3–3	0–4
Flora (Estonia)	5–2	(Republic of Ireland) Shamrock Rovers	4–2	1–0
Riga (Latvia)	2–4	(Gibraltar) Lincoln Red Imps	1–1	1–3 (a.e.t.)
Fola Esch (Luxembourg)	2–7	(Kazakhstan) Kairat	1–4	1–3
Main Path
Qarabağ (Azerbaijan)	4–1	(Scotland) Aberdeen	1–0	3–1
Basel (Switzerland)	4–4 (4–3 p)	(Sweden) Hammarby IF	3–1	1–3 (a.e.t.)
Viktoria Plzeň (Czech Republic)	2–3	(Bulgaria) CSKA Sofia	2–0	0–3 (a.e.t.)
Paços de Ferreira (Portugal)	1–3	(England) Tottenham Hotspur	1–0	0–3
Rennes (France)	5–1	(Norway) Rosenborg	2–0	3–1
Anderlecht (Belgium)	4–5	(Netherlands) Vitesse	3–3	1–2
LASK (Austria)	3–1	(Scotland) St Johnstone	1–1	2–0
Shakhter Karagandy (Kazakhstan)	1–4	(Israel) Maccabi Tel Aviv	1–2	0–2
PAOK (Greece)	3–1	(Croatia) Rijeka	1–1	2–0
KuPS (Finland)	0–4	(Germany) Union Berlin	0–4	0–0
Feyenoord (Netherlands)	6–3	(Sweden) IF Elfsborg	5–0	1–3
Raków Częstochowa (Poland)	1–3	(Belgium) Gent	1–0	0–3
Sivasspor (Turkey)	1–7	(Denmark) Copenhagen	1–2	0–5
Santa Clara (Portugal)	2–3	(Serbia) Partizan	2–1	0–2
Trabzonspor (Turkey)	1–5	(Italy) Roma	1–2	0–3
Hapoel Be'er Sheva (Israel)	1–3	(Cyprus) Anorthosis Famagusta	0–0	1–3
Jablonec (Czech Republic)	8–1	(Slovakia) Žilina	5–1	3–0

=== Champions Path matches ===
19 August 2021
19:00 (20:00 UTC+3)

Žalgiris (Lithuania)	2–2	(Norway) Bodø/Glimt
Kiš 7'; Diaw 90+2'	Report	Saltnes 49', 54'

LFF Stadium, Vilnius
Attendance: 1,230
Referee: Roi Reinshreiber (Israel)
26 August 2021
18:00

Bodø/Glimt (Norway)	1–0	(Lithuania) Žalgiris
Solbakken 62'	Report

Aspmyra Stadion, Bodø
Attendance: 2,428
Referee: John Beaton (Scotland)

Bodø/Glimt won 3–2 on aggregate.

19 August 2021
19:00 (21:00 UTC+4)

Neftçi (Azerbaijan)	3–3	(Israel) Maccabi Haifa
Lawal 50', 66'; Mahmudov 72'	Report	Atzili 9'; Chery 78', 90+6'

Eighth Kilometer District Stadium, Baku
Attendance: 3,400
Referee: Willy Delajod (France)
26 August 2021
19:00 (20:00 UTC+3)

Maccabi Haifa (Israel)	4–0	(Azerbaijan) Neftçi
Menahem 20'; Atzili 45+2'; Haziza 52' (pen.); Abu Fani 69'	Report

Sammy Ofer Stadium, Haifa
Attendance: 18,532
Referee: Aleksandar Stavrev (North Macedonia)

Maccabi Haifa won 7–3 on aggregate.

19 August 2021
18:00 (19:00 UTC+3)

Flora (Estonia)	4–2	(Republic of Ireland) Shamrock Rovers
Zenjov 13'; Miller 27', 87'; Sappinen 76'	Report	Burke 44'; Scales 86'

Lilleküla Stadium, Tallinn
Attendance: 1,129
Referee: Yevhen Aranovskyi (Ukraine)
26 August 2021
21:00 (20:00 UTC+1)

Shamrock Rovers (Republic of Ireland)	0–1	(Estonia) Flora
	Report	Sappinen 57'

Tallaght Stadium, Tallaght
Attendance: 3,500
Referee: Tamás Bognár (Hungary)

Flora won 5–2 on aggregate.

19 August 2021
19:00 (20:00 UTC+3)

Riga (Latvia)	1–1	(Gibraltar) Lincoln Red Imps
Vakulko 61'	Report	Carralero 72'

Skonto Stadium, Riga
Attendance: 1,550
Referee: João Pinheiro (Portugal)
26 August 2021
18:00

Lincoln Red Imps (Gibraltar)	3–1 (a.e.t.)	(Latvia) Riga
Walker 32' (pen.); R. Chipolina 105+1'; Ronan 120+2'	Report	Vakulko 19'

Victoria Stadium, Gibraltar
Attendance: 837
Referee: Peter Kjaesgaard (Denmark)

Lincoln Red Imps won 4–2 on aggregate.

19 August 2021
19:30

Fola Esch (Luxembourg)	1–4	(Kazakhstan) Kairat
Mustafić 19'	Report	Shushenachev 28'; Vágner Love 37', 70' (pen.); Alves 43'

Stade Josy Barthel, Luxembourg City
Attendance: 880
Referee: Fábio Veríssimo (Portugal)
26 August 2021
16:00 (20:00 UTC+6)

Kairat (Kazakhstan)	3–1	(Luxembourg) Fola Esch
Shushenachev 12', 36'; Vágner Love 28'	Report	Mustafić 43'

Almaty Central Stadium, Almaty
Attendance: 0
Referee: Fran Jović (Croatia)

Kairat won 7–2 on aggregate.

=== Main Path matches ===
19 August 2021
18:00 (20:00 UTC+4)

Qarabağ (Azerbaijan)	1–0	(Scotland) Aberdeen
Romero 30'	Report

Tofiq Bahramov Republican Stadium, Baku
Attendance: 9,756
Referee: Rade Obrenovič (Slovenia)
26 August 2021
20:45 (19:45 UTC+1)

Aberdeen (Scotland)	1–3	(Azerbaijan) Qarabağ
Ferguson 90+2' (pen.)	Report	Bayramov 8'; Kady 18'; Zoubir 72'

Pittodrie Stadium, Aberdeen
Attendance: 15,533
Referee: Harald Lechner (Austria)

Qarabağ won 4–1 on aggregate.

19 August 2021
19:30

Basel (Switzerland)	3–1	(Sweden) Hammarby IF
Cabral 30', 87', 90' (pen.)	Report	Khalili 71'

St. Jakob-Park, Basel
Attendance: 12,144
Referee: Sergey Ivanov (Russia)
26 August 2021
19:00

Hammarby IF (Sweden)	3–1 (a.e.t.)	(Switzerland) Basel
Fjóluson 48', 54'; Aziz 101'	Report	Cabral 109' (pen.)
Penalties
Bojanić (penalty missed); Paulinho (penalty missed); Accam (penalty scored); Fenger (penalty scored); Sandberg (penalty scored)	3–4	(penalty scored) Cömert; (penalty scored) Frei; (penalty missed) Pelmard; (penalty scored) Pululu; (penalty scored) Cabral

Tele2 Arena, Stockholm
Attendance: 7,855
Referee: Bobby Madden (Scotland)

4–4 on aggregate; Basel won 4–3 on penalties.

19 August 2021
19:00

Viktoria Plzeň (Czech Republic)	2–0	(Bulgaria) CSKA Sofia
Havel 11'; Mosquera 72'	Report

Doosan Arena, Plzeň
Attendance: 6,859
Referee: Tiago Martins (Portugal)
26 August 2021
19:00 (20:00 UTC+3)

CSKA Sofia (Bulgaria)	3–0 (a.e.t.)	(Czech Republic) Viktoria Plzeň
Carey 6'; Yomov 63'; Mattheij 119'	Report

Vasil Levski National Stadium, Sofia
Attendance: 6,717
Referee: Ali Palabıyık (Turkey)

CSKA Sofia won 3–2 on aggregate.

19 August 2021
20:30 (19:30 UTC+1)

Paços de Ferreira (Portugal)	1–0	(England) Tottenham Hotspur
L. Silva 45'	Report

Estádio Capital do Móvel, Paços de Ferreira
Attendance: 2,284
Referee: Maurizio Mariani (Italy)
26 August 2021
20:45 (19:45 UTC+1)

Tottenham Hotspur (England)	3–0	(Portugal) Paços de Ferreira
Kane 9', 35'; Lo Celso 70'	Report

Tottenham Hotspur Stadium, London
Attendance: 30,215
Referee: Ruddy Buquet (France)

Tottenham Hotspur won 3–1 on aggregate.

19 August 2021
20:00

Rennes (France)	2–0	(Norway) Rosenborg
Aguerd 15'; Guirassy 84'	Report

Roazhon Park, Rennes
Attendance: 14,872
Referee: Radu Petrescu (Romania)
26 August 2021
19:00

Rosenborg (Norway)	1–3	(France) Rennes
Vecchia 68' (pen.)	Report	Del Castillo 6'; Aguerd 41'; Abline 81'

Lerkendal Stadion, Trondheim
Attendance: 5,116
Referee: Paweł Raczkowski (Poland)

Rennes won 5–1 on aggregate.

19 August 2021
20:00

Anderlecht (Belgium)	3–3	(Netherlands) Vitesse
Raman 10', 34'; Verschaeren 90'	Report	Dasa 31'; Frederiksen 46'; Tannane 72'

Constant Vanden Stock Stadium, Brussels
Attendance: 7,877
Referee: Duje Strukan (Croatia)
26 August 2021
19:00

Vitesse (Netherlands)	2–1	(Belgium) Anderlecht
Wittek 4', 49'	Report	Refaelov 81'

GelreDome, Arnhem
Attendance: 10,618
Referee: Bartosz Frankowski (Poland)

Vitesse won 5–4 on aggregate.

19 August 2021
21:00

LASK (Austria)	1–1	(Scotland) St Johnstone
Karamoko 60' (pen.)	Report	Kane 17'

Wörthersee Stadion, Klagenfurt
Attendance: 550
Referee: Glenn Nyberg (Sweden)
26 August 2021
20:45 (19:45 UTC+1)

St Johnstone (Scotland)	0–2	(Austria) LASK
	Report	Balić 72'; Raguž 85' (pen.)

McDiarmid Park, Perth
Attendance: 8,845
Referee: Daniel Siebert (Germany)

LASK won 3–1 on aggregate.

19 August 2021
15:00 (19:00 UTC+6)

Shakhter Karagandy (Kazakhstan)	1–2	(Israel) Maccabi Tel Aviv
Umayev 73'	Report	Rikan 75'; Shamir 77'

Astana Arena, Nur-Sultan
Attendance: 0
Referee: Srđan Jovanović (Serbia)
26 August 2021
19:30 (20:30 UTC+3)

Maccabi Tel Aviv (Israel)	2–0	(Kazakhstan) Shakhter Karagandy
Nachmias 18'; Glazer 40'	Report

Bloomfield Stadium, Tel Aviv
Attendance: 9,645
Referee: Nikola Dabanović (Montenegro)

Maccabi Tel Aviv won 4–1 on aggregate.

19 August 2021
20:00 (21:00 UTC+3)

PAOK (Greece)	1–1	(Croatia) Rijeka
Galešić 90+4' (o.g.)	Report	Lepinjica 33'

Toumba Stadium, Thessaloniki
Attendance: 8,091
Referee: Jérôme Brisard (France)
26 August 2021
20:00

Rijeka (Croatia)	0–2	(Greece) PAOK
	Report	El Kaddouri 11'; Murg 80'

Stadion Rujevica, Rijeka
Attendance: 6,722
Referee: Serhiy Boiko (Ukraine)

PAOK won 3–1 on aggregate.

19 August 2021
18:00 (19:00 UTC+3)

KuPS (Finland)	0–4	(Germany) Union Berlin
	Report	Awoniyi 7', 31'; Kruse 29'; Voglsammer 90+2'

Helsinki Olympic Stadium, Helsinki
Attendance: 5,632
Referee: Ivan Bebek (Croatia)
26 August 2021
20:30

Union Berlin (Germany)	0–0	(Finland) KuPS
	Report

Olympiastadion, Berlin (Note: Union Berlin played their home match at Olympiastadion in Berlin, instead of their regular stadium Stadion An der Alten Försterei, also in Berlin, which did not meet UEFA requirements.)
Attendance: 22,159
Referee: Halil Umut Meler (Turkey)

Union Berlin won 4–0 on aggregate.

19 August 2021
20:00

Feyenoord (Netherlands)	5–0	(Sweden) IF Elfsborg
Sinisterra 25', 37', 48'; Jahanbakhsh 30'; Linssen 58'	Report

De Kuip, Rotterdam
Attendance: 29,765
Referee: Craig Pawson (England)
26 August 2021
19:00

IF Elfsborg (Sweden)	3–1	(Netherlands) Feyenoord
Larsson 42'; Bernhardsson 50'; Ndione 77'	Report	Til 61'

Borås Arena, Borås
Attendance: 1,569
Referee: Georgi Kabakov (Bulgaria)

Feyenoord won 6–3 on aggregate.

19 August 2021
18:00

Raków Częstochowa (Poland)	1–0	(Belgium) Gent
Niewulis 64'	Report

BBOSiR Stadium, Bielsko-Biała
Attendance: 7,411
Referee: Alejandro Hernández (Spain)
26 August 2021
20:00

Gent (Belgium)	3–0	(Poland) Raków Częstochowa
Tissoudali 45+1'; Odjidja-Ofoe 70'; De Sart 72'	Report

Ghelamco Arena, Ghent
Attendance: 10,096
Referee: Aliyar Aghayev (Azerbaijan)

Gent won 3–1 on aggregate.

19 August 2021
20:00 (21:00 UTC+3)

Sivasspor (Turkey)	1–2	(Denmark) Copenhagen
James 59'	Report	Diks 55'; Stage 60'

Sivas Stadium, Sivas
Attendance: 2,602
Referee: Mykola Balakin (Ukraine)
26 August 2021
19:00

Copenhagen (Denmark)	5–0	(Turkey) Sivasspor
Stage 24'; Daramy 39'; Lerager 57'; Biel 62'; Højlund 76'	Report

Parken Stadium, Copenhagen
Attendance: 18,214
Referee: Lawrence Visser (Belgium)

Copenhagen won 7–1 on aggregate.

19 August 2021
22:30 (20:30 UTC+0)

Santa Clara (Portugal)	2–1	(Serbia) Partizan
Carlos 4'; Morita 49'	Report	Vujačić 54'

Estádio de São Miguel, Ponta Delgada
Attendance: 924
Referee: Serdar Gözübüyük (Netherlands)
26 August 2021
21:00

Partizan (Serbia)	2–0	(Portugal) Santa Clara
Ricardo 25' (pen.); Saničanin 27'	Report

Partizan Stadium, Belgrade
Attendance: 14,525
Referee: Craig Pawson (England)

Partizan won 3–2 on aggregate.

19 August 2021
19:30 (20:30 UTC+3)

Trabzonspor (Turkey)	1–2	(Italy) Roma
Cornelius 64'	Report	Pellegrini 55'; Shomurodov 81'

Şenol Güneş Stadium, Trabzon
Attendance: 12,870
Referee: Matej Jug (Slovenia)
26 August 2021
19:00

Roma (Italy)	3–0	(Turkey) Trabzonspor
Cristante 20'; Zaniolo 65'; El Shaarawy 84'	Report

Stadio Olimpico, Rome
Attendance: 25,906
Referee: Srđan Jovanović (Serbia)

Roma won 5–1 on aggregate.

19 August 2021
19:00 (20:00 UTC+3)

Hapoel Be'er Sheva (Israel)	0–0	(Cyprus) Anorthosis Famagusta
	Report

Turner Stadium, Be'er Sheva
Attendance: 7,950
Referee: Irfan Peljto (Bosnia and Herzegovina)
26 August 2021
19:00 (20:00 UTC+3)

Anorthosis Famagusta (Cyprus)	3–1	(Israel) Hapoel Be'er Sheva
Artymatas 12'; Christodoulopoulos 62' (pen.), 69'	Report	Shechter 43'

Antonis Papadopoulos Stadium, Larnaca
Attendance: 6,678
Referee: Donatas Rumšas (Lithuania)

Anorthosis Famagusta won 3–1 on aggregate.

19 August 2021
20:00

Jablonec (Czech Republic)	5–1	(Slovakia) Žilina
Kratochvíl 10', 22'; Doležal 41'; Považanec 45+1'; Martinec 90'	Report	Jibril 75'

Stadion Střelnice, Jablonec nad Nisou
Attendance: 4,378
Referee: Jakob Kehlet (Denmark)
26 August 2021
18:00

Žilina (Slovakia)	0–3	(Czech Republic) Jablonec
	Report	Pleštil 30'; Vaníček 86'; Čvančara 88'

Štadión pod Dubňom, Žilina
Attendance: 3,122
Referee: Kristo Tohver (Estonia)

Jablonec won 8–1 on aggregate.
