= Faroe Islands v Austria (UEFA Euro 1992 qualifying) =

Faroe Islands v Austria (1990)
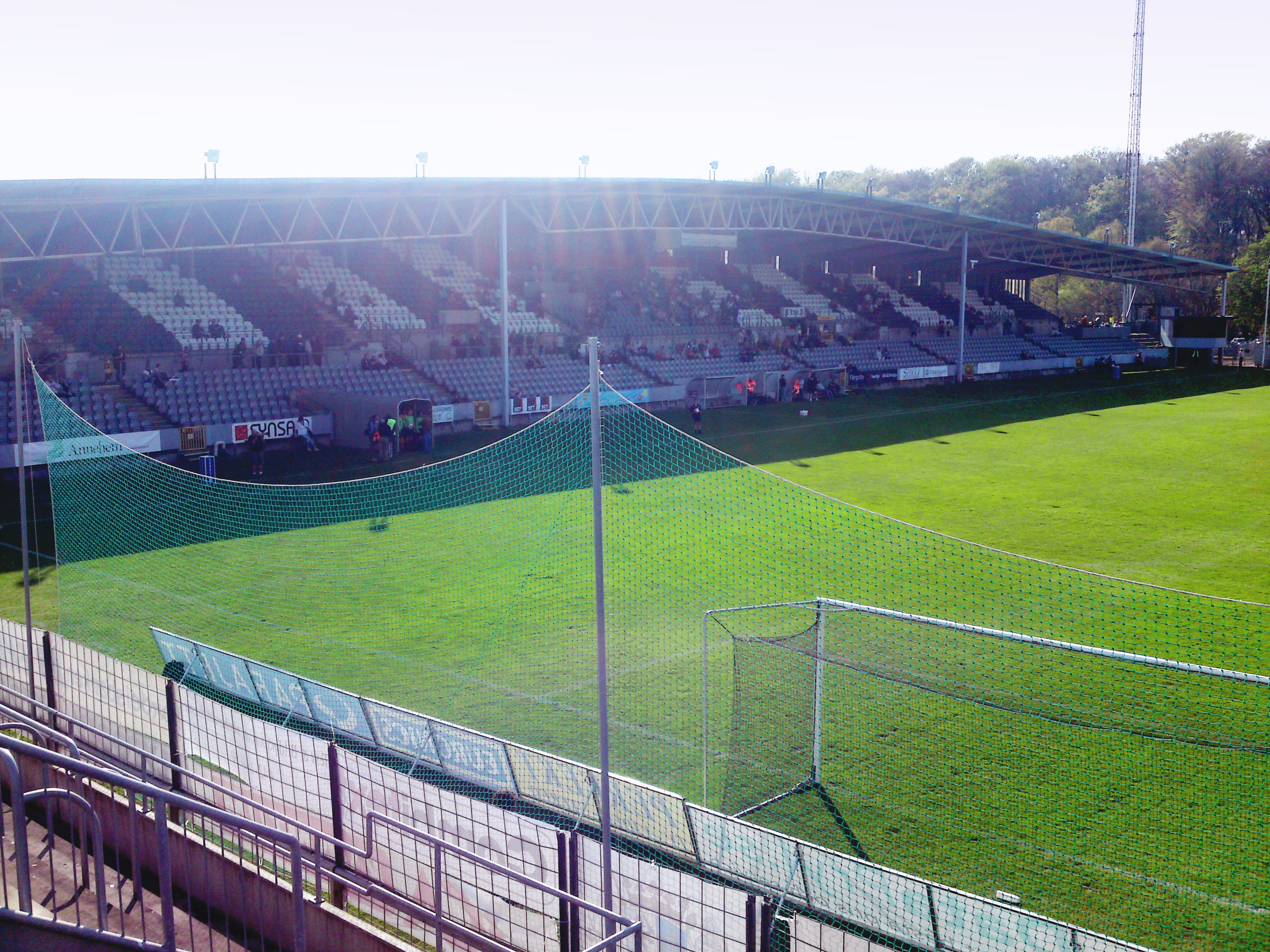
- The Landskrona IP in Landskrona hosted the match
- Event: UEFA Euro 1992 qualifying Group 4 Matchday 1
Faroe Islands	Austria
1	0
- Date: 12 September 1990
- Venue: Landskrona IP, Landskrona
- Referee: Egil Nervik (Norway)
- Attendance: 1,157

The Faroe Islands defeated Austria 1–0 on 12 September 1990 in a UEFA Euro 1992 qualifying match at Landskrona IP in Landskrona, Sweden. The result is notable as one of the biggest shocks in football history, as the Faroe Islands were playing their first ever competitive match with a team composed of amateur players, while Austria had played at the 1990 FIFA World Cup in Italy less than three months earlier.

== Background ==
The Faroe Islands Football Association became a member of FIFA on 2 July 1988 and joined UEFA on 18 April 1990. Austria, in turn, played at the 1990 FIFA World Cup in Italy less than three months earlier and were eliminated in the group stage.

Because the Faroe Islands did not have a suitable football stadium, their national team chose to play its matches in Sweden, using Landskrona IP as their home ground.

== Match ==
=== Details ===
12 September 1990
19:00 CEST

Faroe Islands	1–0	Austria
Nielsen 61'	Report

Landskrona IP, Landskrona, Sweden
Attendance: 1,157
Referee: Egil Nervik (Norway)

Faroe Islands	Austria

GK	1	Jens Martin Knudsen
RB	8	Jan Dam
CB	4	Mikkjal Danielsen
CB	2	Jóannes Jakobsen (c)
LB	3	Tummas Eli Hansen
RM	6	Allan Mørkøre	(yellow card) 44'
CM	9	Abraham Løkin
CM	5	Julian Hansen
LM	7	Torkil Nielsen
CF	11	Kurt Mørkøre	(yellow card) 8'
CF	10	Kári Reynheim	(yellow card) 87'
Manager:
(Iceland) Páll Guðlaugsson

GK	1	Michael Konsel
RB	4	Jürgen Hartmann
CB	5	Michael Streiter	(yellow card) 58'
CB	3	Robert Pecl
LB	2	Kurt Russ
DM	6	Heinz Peischl
DM	8	Manfred Linzmaier (c)
AM	10	Andi Herzog		(substituted off) 62'
AM	11	Andreas Reisinger		(substituted off) 62'
CF	7	Gerhard Rodax
CF	9	Toni Polster
Substitutions:
MF	14	Gerald Willfurth		(substituted in) 62'
FW	15	Peter Pacult		(substituted in) 62'
Manager:
Josef Hickersberger

Assistant referees:
Kjell Nordby (Norway)
Roy Helge Olsen (Norway)
Fourth official:
Peter Mikkelsen (Denmark)

Match rules

- 90 minutes.
- Maximum of two substitutions.

== Aftermath ==
Austria coach Josef Hickersberger resigned the day after the loss. In the return fixture, played on 22 April 1991 at Salzburg, Austria beat the Faroes 3–0. Neither team managed to win against the other opponents of the group and finished at the bottom, with Austria in 4th and the Faroe Islands in 5th.

Hickersberger returned to coach the Austria national team in 2006, quitting after UEFA Euro 2008, which Austria co-hosted with Switzerland. The two teams were again scheduled to play in October at Tórshavn for the 2010 FIFA World Cup qualification, and again in Group F of the 2022 FIFA World Cup qualification games.
