= Hickersberger =

Hickersberger is a surname. Notable people with the surname include:

- Josef Hickersberger (born 1948), Austrian football player and coach
- Thomas Hickersberger (born 1973), Austrian football player and coach, son of Josef
