= Oscar De La Riva Aguado =

Spanish-Andorran chess grandmaster (born 1972)

Óscar de la Riva Aguado
- Óscar de la Riva Aguado in 2014

Personal information
- Born: July 15, 1972 (age 54) Barcelona, Spain

Chess career
- Country: Spain (until 2000); Andorra (since 2000)
- Title: Grandmaster (2004)
- FIDE rating: 2419 (November 2026)
- Peak rating: 2556 (April 2004)

Óscar de la Riva Aguado (born 15 July 1972) is a Spanish-Andorran chess Grandmaster, FIDE Arbiter, and FIDE Trainer who represents the Andorran Chess Federation.

== Career ==
In 2003, De la Riva won the Spanish Chess Championship, defeating Salvador Gabriel Del Río Angelis 2–0 in the final tiebreak after eliminating multi-time champion Miguel Illescas Córdoba in the semi-finals. He is also a six-time winner of the Andorran Chess Championship.

De la Riva represented Andorra on board one at eight consecutive Chess Olympiads between 2000 and 2014.

In club chess, he has played in the top division of the French Chess Championship for Club de Echiquier Orangeois, and in the Spanish Honor Division for UE Foment Martinenc Barcelona and GEVA-CEA Andorra. In 1993, he represented a regional Catalan team in the European Club Cup.

FIDE awarded him the International Master (IM) title in 1994, the Grandmaster (GM) title in 2004, the FIDE Arbiter title in 2011, and the FIDE Trainer title in 2013.

In 2014, he placed third with 8.5/11 at the FIDE Zone 1.10 Championship in Cyprus. At the 2016 edition in Luxembourg, he finished as runner-up behind Helgi Ziska.

== Works ==
- La Holandesa Leningrado (2001)
- With Raül García: … i Mat 1 (2008) ISBN 978-99920-906-8-8
