= Erling Jacobsen =

Faroese footballer (born 1990)

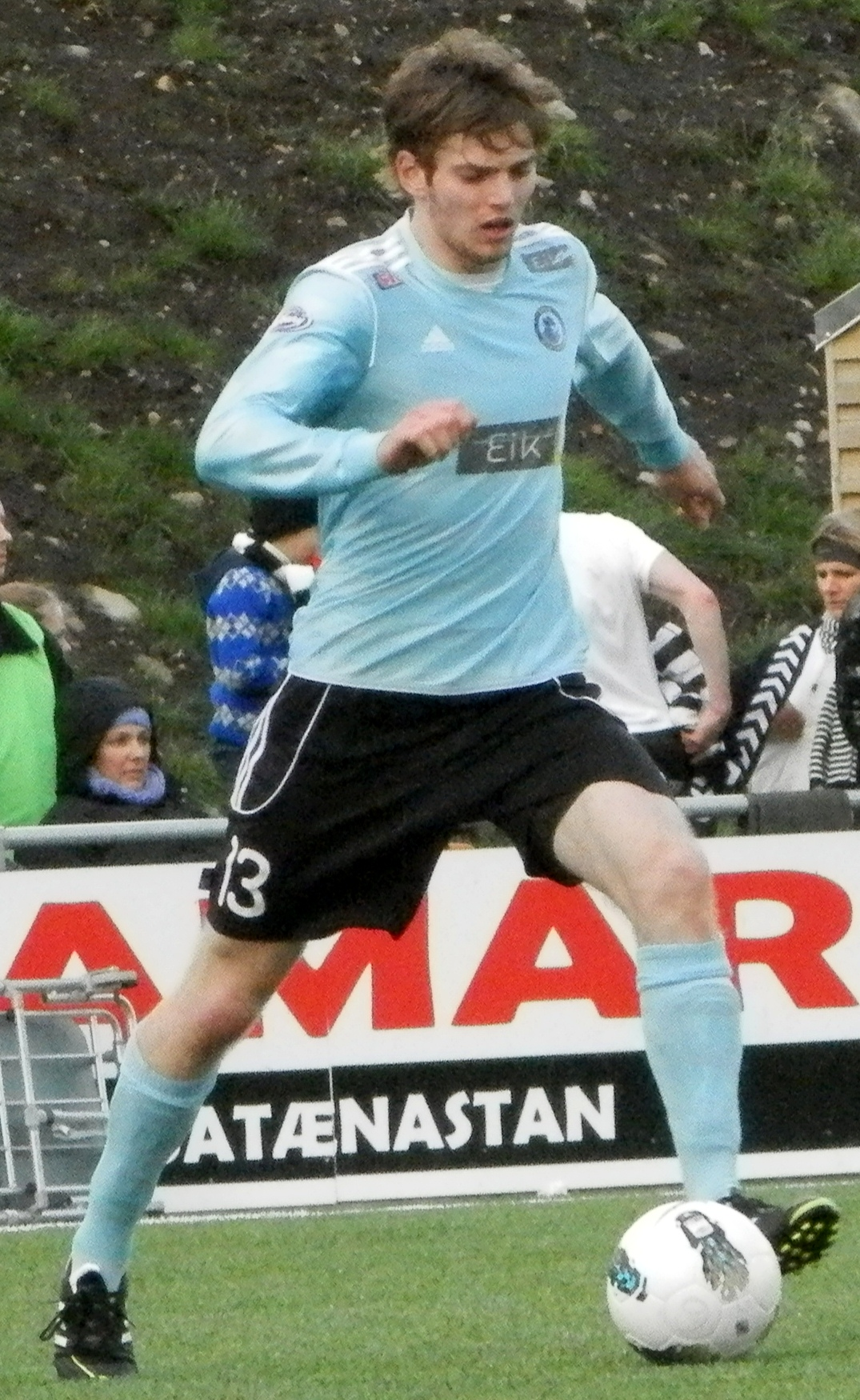
- Erling Jacobsen in 2012 while playing for Víkingur Gøta

Personal information
- Full name: Erling Dávidsson Jacobsen
- Date of birth: 13 February 1990 (age 36)
- Place of birth: Norðragøta, Faroe Islands
- Height: 1.83 m (6 ft 0 in)
- Position: Defender

Team information
- Current team: Víkingur
- Number: 13

Senior career*
Years	Team	Apps	(Gls)
2006–2007	Fremad Amager	?	(?)
2007	GÍ Gøta	13	(2)
2007–2008	Fremad Amager	3	(0)
2008	Víkingur	5	(2)
2008–2009	FC Amager	1	(0)
2009	Víkingur	1	(0)
2009–2010	Vanløse IF	?	(?)
2010–	Víkingur	63	(4)

International career^{‡}
2005	Faroe Islands U15	?	(?)
2005–06	Faroe Islands U17	6	(0)
2007–08	Faroe Islands U19	6	(0)
2009–12	Faroe Islands U21	7	(0)
2010–	Faroe Islands	4	(0)
- * Club domestic league appearances and goals as of 26 September 2012 ‡ National team caps and goals as of 4 September 2015

Erling Dávidsson Jacobsen (born 13 February 1990) is a Faroese international footballer who plays as a defender for Víkingur.

== Career ==
Jacobsen has played club football in both Denmark and the Faroe Islands for Fremad Amager, GÍ Gøta, FC Amager and Vanløse IF. He had his debut on the Faroe Islands national football team in the 1–1 draw against Northern Ireland on 12 October 2010 on Svangaskarð Stadium. The Faroese newspaper Dimmalætting called Jacobsen "Man of the Match" in a headline in the following edition. In an internet article on their website, UEFA said in a subheadline two weeks after the draw against Northern Ireland "One to watch: Erling Jacobsen (Víkingur)". Jacobsen has also played for all the youth national teams of the Faroe Islands: Faroe Islands U21, Faroe Islands U19, Faroe Islands U17 and for Faroe Islands U15. He played with the team which won the Aberdeen International Football Festival 2006 for Boys 16. Jacobsen also won the Boys 16 5-A-Side competition at the same festival together with three other Faroese football players.

== Young Player of the Year ==
Every year after the end of the Faroese football season the Faroese newspaper Sosialurin arranges an award evening in order to honour the best Faroese football players and others. The categories are: Best Male Football Player, Best Female Football Player, Young Player of the Year (male and female), Goal Keeper of the Year, Coach of the Year and Judge of the Year. It is the captains and coaches of all the teams in the best Faroese football divisions for men and women who elect the best persons. Erling Jacobsen won the award "Young Player of the Year 2010".
