= Hallur Hansson =

Faroese footballer (born 1992)

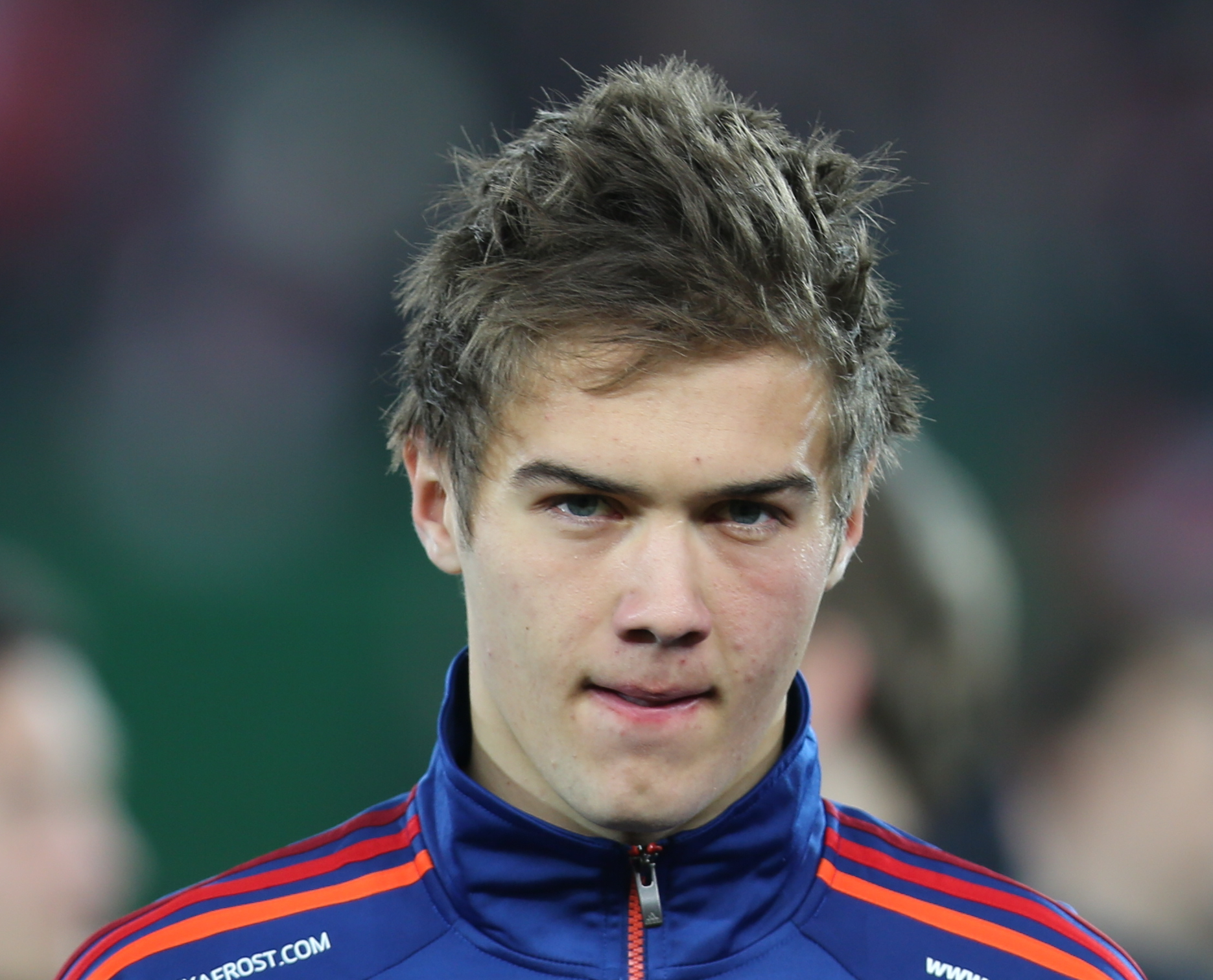
- Hansson in 2013

Personal information
- Full name: Hallur Hansson
- Date of birth: 8 July 1992 (age 34)
- Place of birth: Tórshavn, Faroe Islands
- Height: 1.82 m (6 ft 0 in)
- Position: Midfielder

Youth career
- VB Vágur
- 2008: HB Tórshavn

Senior career*
Years	Team	Apps	(Gls)
2008–2011	Aberdeen	1	(0)
2011–2012	HB Tórshavn	31	(6)
2012–2014	AaB	5	(0)
2014	Víkingur	36	(10)
2014–2016	Vendsyssel	45	(6)
2016–2021	Horsens	149	(19)
2021	Vejle	6	(1)
2022	KR Reykjavík	20	(1)
2023–2026	KÍ	49	(5)
Total		342	(48)

International career
2006	Faroe Islands U15	?	(?)
2007–2009	Faroe Islands U17	12	(0)
2009–2011	Faroe Islands U19	8	(1)
2009–2013	Faroe Islands U21	11	(0)
2012–2025	Faroe Islands	76	(5)
- * Club domestic league appearances and goals

Hallur Hansson (born 8 July 1992) is a Faroese former professional footballer who played as a midfielder. Hansson is widely regarded as one of the best Faroe players of his generation alongside with striker Jóan Símun Edmundsson and goalkeeper Gunnar Nielsen among others.

Started his professional career in Scotland as part of Aberdeen, he moved to Denmark to play for AaB from 2012 until 31 January 2014. The first half-year he was on loan from HB Tórshavn, but on 29 January 2013 he signed an 18-month deal with AaB. He then played two and a half years for Vendsyssel FF. After impressing there, he was signed by AC Horsens where played for five years before joining Vejle in 2021. After spent the 2022 season with Icelandic side KR Reykjavík - Hansson returned home to native Faroe Islands where he ended his career in 2026 with KÍ.

Hansson represented the Faroe Islands at various youth levels, including the under-17, under-19, and under-21 teams. He played for the senior national team between 2012 and 2025.

== Club career ==
Hansson played for some years for the football club in Vágur, Suðuroy; the club's name was formerly VB Vágur, in 2005 they merged with Sumba Football Club and was called VB/Sumba, who changed their name in 2010 to FC Suðuroy. Hansson lived in Vágur for some years with his family at that time, but later they moved to Tórshavn and he began to play for HB Tórshavn. It was in 2008 while he played for HB Tórshavn's youth team and some matches for the second best division, that he signed a two-year deal with Aberdeen in Scotland together with Gilli Sørensen from Tvøroyri, who also played for HB Tórshavn at that time. Hansson and Sørensen were spotted by Aberdeen at the Aberdeen International Football Festival in 2006. Hallur Hansson played on the U17 Faroe Islands team which participated at the Aberdeen International Football Festival 2007. Hansson's team won the football competition in Aberdeen. In May 2010, both Faroese players (Hansson and Sørensen) extended their contracts with the club. Hansson made his debut for Aberdeen in the Scottish Premier League on 27 November 2010. Aberdeen lost 2–0 in their away match against Kilmarnock.

On 29 January 2013, he signed a one-and-a-half-year deal with Danish Superliga club AaB after playing for the club for a half-year on loan from HB Tórshavn. He has made six appearances for AaB's Superliga team. On 31 January 2014, AaB announced that they no longer had a contract with Hansson. In February 2014, he made a contract with the Faroese club Víkingur Gøta. He made an immediate impact with his new club and would go on to score the only goal of the game in the final of the 2014 Faroe Islands Cup against former club HB.

Following the 2014 season, he signed for Danish club Vendsyssel FF.

On 17 June 2016, Hansson signed a two-year contract with Danish Superliga club AC Horsens. After five years in Horsens, Hansson's contract was terminated by mutual agreement on 24 July 2021.

After a spell at Vejle, Hansson moved to KR Reykjavík for the 2022 season.

On 31 March 2023, Hansson moved back to the Faroe Islands, signing a three-year contract with KÍ. He was part of the team that sensationally reached to the group stage of the UEFA Conference League in the 2023-24 season after eliminating both Hungarian giants Ferencváros and Swedish champions BK Häcken in the UEFA Champions League qualifiying. During the autumn, Hansson suffered a knee injury that caused him to miss the majority of the UEFA Conference League campaign.

In 2026 - Hansson announced that he will retire from football after the 2026 season.

== International career ==
=== Youth ===
Hansson went to Aberdeen in Scotland in the summer of 2007 with the Faroe Islands under-17 team to play in the Aberdeen International Football Festival. Hansson and his team won the competition; it was the first time that the Faroe Islands U17 won this competition.

Hansson played for the Faroe Islands under-19s against Croatia on 7 October 2010, scoring his team's second goal in a 2–2 draw.

=== Senior ===
Hansson made his debut for the senior Faroe Islands national team in a friendly loss to Iceland on 15 August 2012. His performance earned him a starting place for the team's first 2014 FIFA World Cup qualification match, a 3–0 defeat to Germany in Hannover.

On 11 October 2013, Hansson scored his first international goal in a 1–1 draw with Kazakhstan in World Cup qualification. On 13 June 2015, during UEFA Euro 2016 qualifying, he scored the Faroes' opening goal in an upset 2–1 win over Greece. Hansson capped 76 times for Faroe Islands between 2012 and 2025 and scored 5 goals.

== Career statistics ==
Scores and results list Faroe Islands' goal tally first, score column indicates score after each Hansson goal.

List of international goals scored by Hallur Hansson
No.	Date	Venue	Opponent	Score	Result	Competition	Ref.
1	11 October 2013	Tórsvøllur, Tórshavn, Faroe Islands	Kazakhstan	1–0	1–1	2014 FIFA World Cup qualification	
2	19 November 2013	Ta' Qali National Stadium, Ta' Qali, Malta	Malta	1–3	2–3	Friendly	
3	1 March 2014	Victoria Stadium, Gibraltar	Gibraltar	3–1	4–1	Friendly	
4	13 June 2015	Tórsvøllur, Tórshavn, Faroe Islands	Greece	1–0	2–1	UEFA Euro 2016 qualification	
5	7 September 2018	Tórsvøllur, Tórshavn, Faroe Islands	Malta	3–1	3–1	2018–19 UEFA Nations League D	

== Honours ==
Víkingur Gøta

- Faroe Islands Cup: 2014

Individual

- Effodeildin Best Midfielder: 2012
- Effodeildin Team of the Season: 2012
