= Faroese Chess Championship =

The Faroese Chess Championship is organized by the Faroese Chess Association (Faroese: Talvsamband Føroya, TSF), which was established in 1970. The championship has been held annually since 1972.

== National championship winners ==
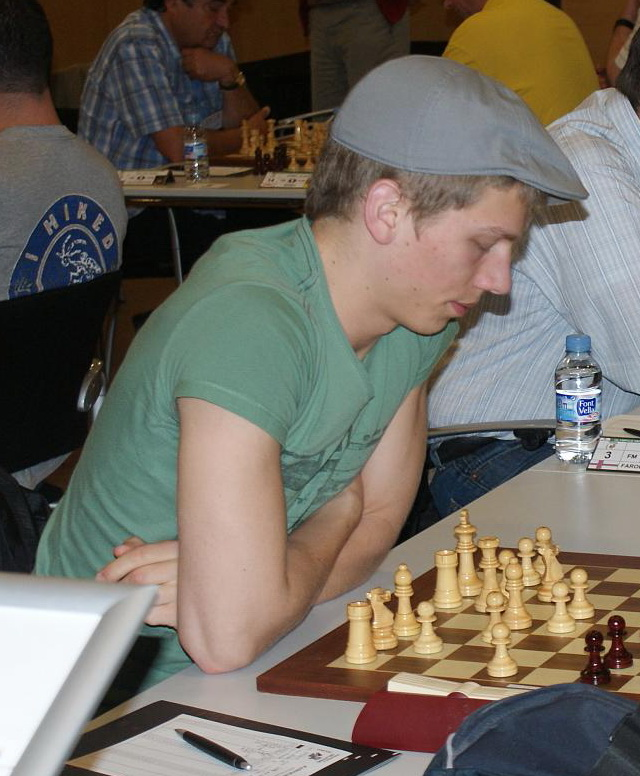
Helgi Dam Ziska, the Faroe Islands' first and so far only grandmaster and 6 times Faroese chess champion in 2008, 2011, 2017, 2018, 2019 and 2023.

Year	Champion
1972	Hans Petersen
1973	Suní Ziska
1974	Luitjen Apol
1975	Luitjen Apol
1976	Luitjen Apol
1977	Hanus Joensen
1978	John Jacobsen
1979	Jens Christian Hansen
1980	Súni Ziska
1981	Jens Christian Hansen
1982	Jens Christian Hansen
1983	Andrias Ziska
1984	Torkil Nielsen
1985	Jens Christian Hansen
1986	Torkil Nielsen
1987	Bogi Ziska
1988	Torkil Nielsen
1989	Heini Olsen
1990	Steintór Rasmussen
1991	Heini Olsen
1992	Heini Olsen
1993	Heini Olsen
1994	Torbjørn Thomsen
1995	Eyðun Nolsøe
1996	Rógvi W. Rasmussen
1997	Rani Nolsøe
1998	John Rødgaard
1999	Heini Olsen
2000	Flóvin Tór Næs
2001	John Rødgaard
2002	Hans Kristian Simonsen
2003	Martin Poulsen
2004	Martin Poulsen
2005	Carl Eli Nolsøe Samuelsen
2006	Martin Poulsen
2007	John Rødgaard
2008	Helgi Dam Ziska
2009	Martin Poulsen
2010	Olaf Berg
2011	Helgi Dam Ziska
2012	Rógvi Egilstoft Nielsen
2013	Olaf Berg
2014	Høgni Egilstoft Nielsen
2015	Rógvi Egilstoft Nielsen
2016	Rógvi Egilstoft Nielsen
2017	Helgi Dam Ziska
2018	Helgi Dam Ziska
2019	Helgi Dam Ziska
2020	Høgni Egilstoft Nielsen
2021	Høgni Egilstoft Nielsen
2022	Høgni Egilstoft Nielsen
2023	Helgi Dam Ziska
2024	Luitjen Akselsson Apol
2025	Høgni Egilstoft Nielsen
