= Josef Hickersberger =

Austrian footballer and manager (born 1948)

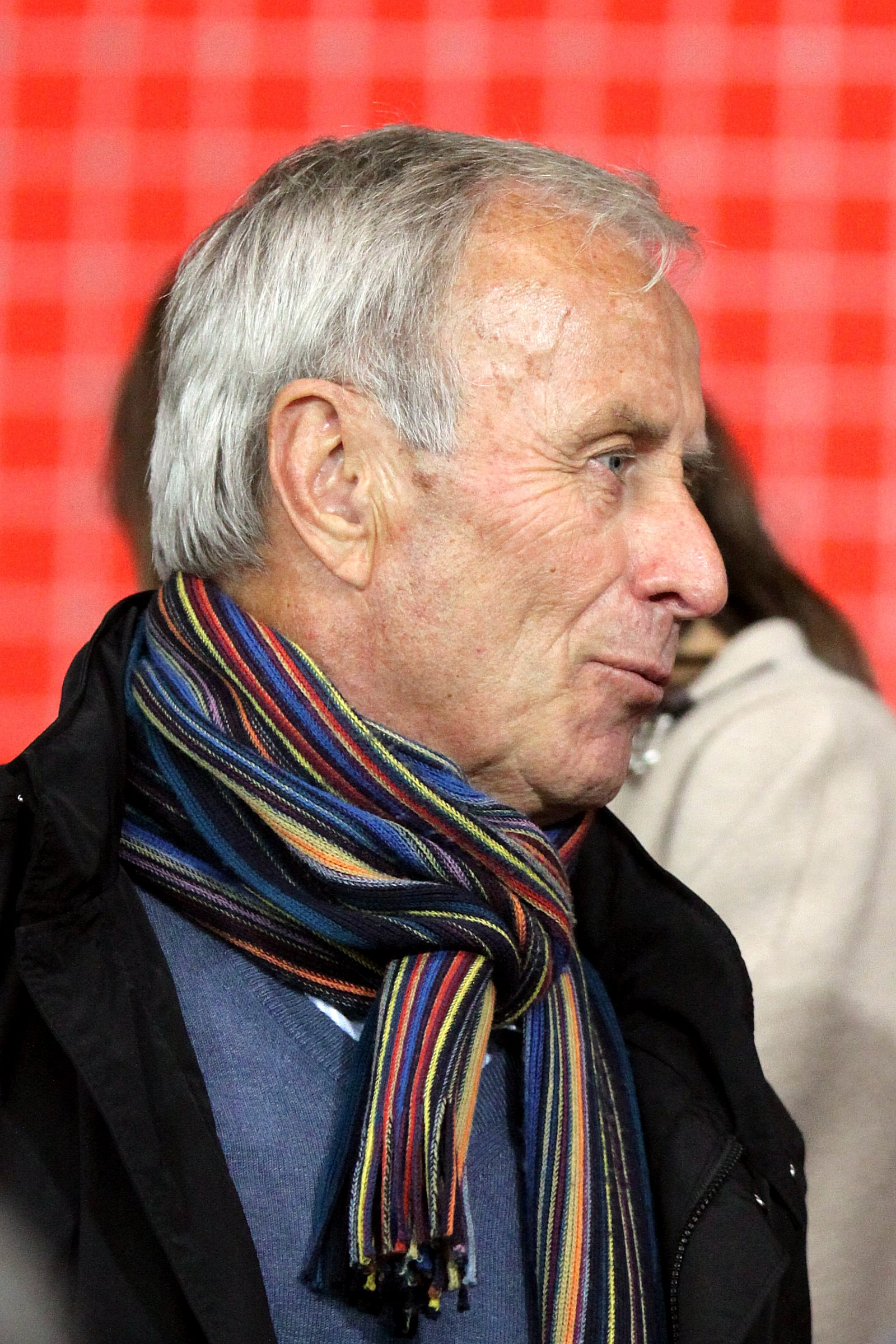
- Hickersberger in 2015

Personal information
- Date of birth: 27 April 1948 (age 78)
- Place of birth: Amstetten, Austria
- Height: 1.77 m (5 ft 10 in)
- Position: Midfielder

Youth career
- 1960–1966: ASK Amstetten

Senior career*
Years	Team	Apps	(Gls)
1966–1972	Austria Wien	112	(28)
1972–1976	Kickers Offenbach	118	(28)
1976–1978	Fortuna Düsseldorf	59	(5)
1978–1980	SSW Innsbruck	35	(6)
1980–1982	Rapid Wien	48	(4)
Total		372	(71)

International career
1968–1978	Austria	39	(5)

Managerial career
- 1988–1990: Austria
- 1991–1992: Fortuna Düsseldorf
- 1993–1994: Austria Wien
- 1995–1997: Al Ahli
- 1996: Bahrain
- 1997–1999: El Mokawloon
- 1999–2000: Al-Shaab CSC
- 2000–2001: Al-Wasl
- 2001–2002: Al-Ittihad Qatar
- 2002–2005: Rapid Wien
- 2006–2008: Austria
- 2008–2010: Al-Wahda
- 2010: Bahrain
- 2010–2012: Al-Wahda
- * Club domestic league appearances and goals

Josef Hickersberger (born 27 April 1948) is a former professional football player and former coach of the Austria national football team and Austrian club side Rapid Wien.

== Club career ==
Hickersberger was born in Amstetten, Austria. He started his playing career with Austria Wien, where he was brought in by Ernst Ocwirk in 1966. After six successful seasons he was sold for 2.1 million schillings to Bundesliga side Kickers Offenbach. He later moved on to Fortuna Düsseldorf, then returned to Austria to join SSW Innsbruck and finished his professional career with Rapid Vienna. He continued playing for amateur sides Badener AC, UFC Pama, SV Forchtenstein and WSV Traisen where he took up his first coaching posts.

== International career ==
Hickersberger made his debut for Austria in May 1968 against Romania and was a participant at the 1978 FIFA World Cup. He earned 39 caps, scoring five goals. His last international match was at the World Cup in 1978 against West Germany, a game dubbed The miracle of Córdoba which Austria won 3–2.

== Managerial career ==
Since retiring as a player, Hickersberger has worked as a football coach. He was the coach of the Austria national team at the 1990 FIFA World Cup in Italy. However, after the sensational and embarrassing 1–0 defeat against the Faroe Islands in the first qualifying game of UEFA Euro 1992, he decided to quit and subsequently coached Fortuna Düsseldorf (1990–1992) and Austria Wien (1993–94).

Hickersberger then worked for a few years in the Middle Eastern region, where he trained several teams, among them the Bahrain national team, and Al Wasl FC Dubai, one of the most popular clubs in the UAE.

In 2002, Hickersberger returned to Austria, and brought back success to Rapid Wien. With him as coach, Rapid won the Austrian Championship of 2004–05, nine years after the last triumph, and accordingly qualified for the UEFA Champions League group stage where Rapid faced the teams of Bayern Munich, Juventus and Club Brugge.

He coached the Austria national team during the UEFA Euro 2008 played in Austria and Switzerland, obtaining only one point out of nine. Austria lost 1–0 against Croatia and Germany, and rescued a late draw, a 1–1 against Poland with a goal of Ivica Vastić on minute 93. Austria stayed in the third position in the Group B, staying out of the competition in their own country. Hickersberger and Joachim Löw were sent off in the match between Austria and Germany after claiming some errors made by Manuel Enrique Mejuto González. On 23 June 2008, he quit the Austria national team post.

On 10 December, Hickersberger signed a contract with Al-Wahda FC (Abu Dhabi) as head coach until 30 June 2009. After finishing fourth, therefore earning a play-off berth in the Asian Champions League, and leading the team to the Etisalat Cup Final in his first year at the club, he signed a one-year extension. He also brought along two of his former national team assistant coaches, including Klaus Lindenberger.

== Personal life ==
Hickersberger's son Thomas played for the Austria national team in 2002.

== Career statistics ==
Scores and results list Austria's goal tally first.

#	Date	Venue	Opponent	Score	Result	Competition
1.	30 April 1972	Praterstadion, Vienna	Malta	1–0	4–0	1974 World Cup qualifier
2.	30 April 1972	Praterstadion, Vienna	Malta	2–0	4–0	1974 World Cup qualifier
3.	30 April 1972	Praterstadion, Vienna	Malta	3–0	4–0	1974 World Cup qualifier
4.	3 September 1972	Stadionul Central, Craiova	Romania	1–0	1–1	Friendly
5.	10 November 1976	Kavala National Stadium, Kavala	Greece	1–0	3–0	Friendly

== Managerial statistics ==
As of 31 May 2012

Team	From	To	Record				
Team	From	To	G	W	D	L	Win %
Austria	1 January 1988	14 September 1990	29	10	7	12	34.48
Fortuna Düsseldorf	1 January 1991	28 August 1991	23	7	3	13	30.43
Austria Wien^{1}	1 July 1993	30 June 1994	40	23	5	12	57.50
Al Ahli SC	1 July 1995	30 June 1997					
Bahrain	1 January 1996	21 December 1996	7	1	2	4	14.29
El Mokawloon SC	1 July 1997	30 June 1999					
Al-Shaab CSC	1 July 1999	30 June 2000					
Al Wasl FC	1 July 2000	30 June 2001					
Al-Gharafa Sports Club	1 July 2001	30 June 2002					
Rapid Wien^{1}	1 July 2002	21 December 2005	143	63	38	42	44.06
Austria	1 January 2006	23 June 2008	24	5	8	11	20.83
Al Wahda S.C.C.	10 December 2008	1 June 2010					
Bahrain	3 June 2010	20 October 2010	7	2	2	3	28.57
Al Wahda S.C.C.	22 October 2010	31 May 2012	38	15	13	10	39.47
Total			311	126	78	107	40.51

- 1.Statistics includes league and Europe.

== Honours ==
=== As a player ===
- Austrian Football Bundesliga: 1968–69, 1969–70, 1981–82
- Austrian Cup: 1968–69, 1970–71, 1978–79

=== As a manager ===
- Austrian Cup: 1993–94
- Bahraini Premier League: 1995–96
- Qatari League: 2001–02
- Austrian Football Bundesliga: 2004–05
