= Torkil Nielsen =

Faroese footballer

- Born: 26 January 1964 (age 62); Sandavágur, Faroe Islands
Association football career
- Position: Midfielder
Senior career*
Years	Team	Apps	(Gls)
1987–1993	SÍF Sandavágur	101	(49)
1994–1997	FS Vágar	63	(26)
1999–2001	FS Vágar	9	(4)
2003	FS Vágar	1	(0)
2007	FS Vágar 2004	3	(1)
International career
1988–1993	Faroe Islands	18	(2)
- * Club domestic league appearances and goals
- Chess career
- Country: Faroe Islands
- Peak rating: 2205 (January 1983)

Torkil Nielsen (Faroese pronunciation: [ˈtʰɔɹ̥tʃɪl ˈnɪlsɛn], born 26 January 1964) is a Faroese former football midfielder. He is also one of the Faroe Islands' best chess players.

== Club career ==
He played most of his career at SÍF Sandavágur and after they merged with MB Miðvágur he played with the club which was a result of the merger, FS Vágar. He was an active football player until 1997, after that he just played a few matches and played his last match in 2007, just before the club was re-established into 07 Vestur after a merger between FS Vágar 2004 and SÍ Sørvágur.

== International career ==
Nielsen played in an August 1988 friendly match against Iceland, the country's first FIFA-recognized match. He scored the very first Faroese goal after FIFA recognition, in a game, which also turned out to be the first ever official victory for the Faroe Islands, winning 1–0 in a friendly over Canada in April 1989.

Torkil claimed his place in world football history for his goal in the 1992 European championship qualifying shock 1–0 defeat of Austria in September 1990, which also was the Faroe Islands' first competitive match. His final match was a June 1993 World Cup qualifying match against Czechoslovakia. He earned 18 caps, scoring 2 goals.

== International goals ==
Scores and results list Faroe Islands' goal tally first.

#	Date	Venue	Opponent	Score	Result	Competition
1	14 April 1989	Gundadalur, Tórshavn, Faroe Islands	Canada	1-0	1-0	Friendly
2	12 September 1990	Idrottsparken, Landskrona, Sweden	Austria	1-0	1-0	Euro 1992 Qualifying

== Chess career ==
During and after his football career, Torkil Nielsen plays chess with the club Sandavágs talvfelag. He was a three-time individual champion of the Faroes in 1984, 1986 and 1988; and participated three times in the Chess Olympiad as a member of Faroese chess national team - in 1982 in Lucerne, Switzerland, and in 1984 and 1988 in Thessaloniki, Greece.

== Personal life ==
Two of Torkil Nielsen's sons, Rógvi (born 1992) and Høgni Egilstoft Nielsen (born 1997) are also football players as well as chess players, just like their father. His elder son, Rógvi Egilstoft, is also a notable football and chess player. He is a defender for NSÍ Runavík football club and represented Faroes at U-19 level. He was individual chess champion of the Faroes in 2012, 2015 and 2016. He is ELO rated 2313 at the World Chess Federation as of january 2026. Rógvi Egilstoft is also acting mayor of the municipality of Eiði (Eiðis kommuna).

His younger son, Høgni Egilstoft Nielsen, was considered among the most promising chess players of Scandinavia in his age group. In 2014, he won the Faroese Chess Championship for adults at the age of 16, and became the youngest ever to win the championship. Høgni was also the first player ever who won all matches played in a Faroese Chess Championship. Høgni also plays football as a defender for 07 Vestur and also played 10 national matches for the Faroe Islands national football team at U-17 level in 2013. Høgni achieved the title of International Master (IM) in Oktober 2024, and is ELO rated 2391 at the World Chess Federation as of January 2026
