= Banan, Landskrona =

Former sports ground in Landskrona, Scania, Sweden

Banan (English: "the track" or "the lane") was the informal name of the first sports ground in Landskrona, Scania, and the third ever constructed in Sweden. It was inaugurated in 1893, then as a very simple kind of a velodrome with a grass field in its middle.

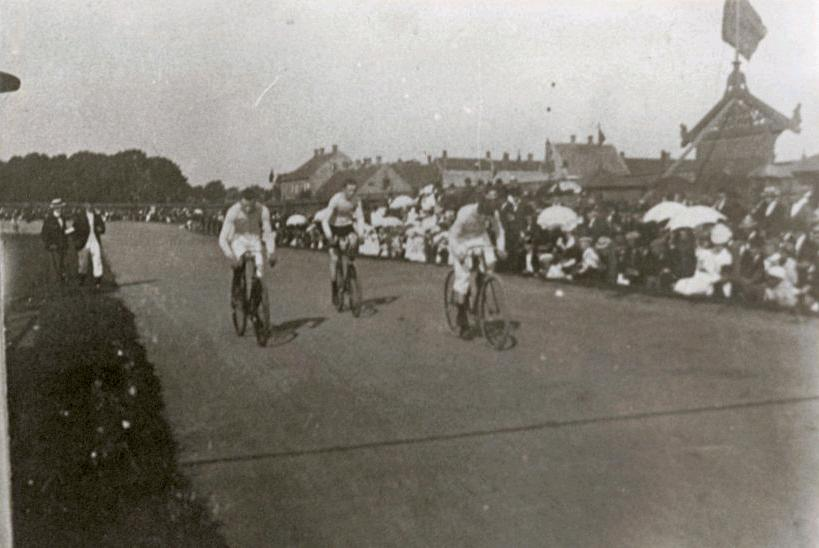
Cycle race with totalizator from 1895, at the old sports venue in Landskrona

== History ==
It was built by the local cycling club, Landskrona Velocipedklubb, and was most likely given the formal name "Velocipedbanan", but the local residents simply called it "Banan". In its first years was it mainly used for cycling races with totalizators. The use of totalizators became prohibited by Swedish law in 1896, coinciding with the first modern Olympics, which promoted amateurism in sports. This left Landskrona Velocipedklubb in financial crisis, and the sports field was eventually submitted to the council of Landskrona Town. It was located between the Artillerigatan street and the most outer moat of Landskrona Citadel, with its eastern corner (and short side) about 250 meter from that street's eastern end

However, cycling was not the only popular sport, and already by 1882 had GF Idrott established itself as one of the first sports clubs in Landskrona, made up of twenty men, of which many came from an artillery regiment located in the town. GF Idrott began with gymnastics but soon other sports were included in their program, such as athletics, football and swimming, and for their outdoor activities they used Banan.

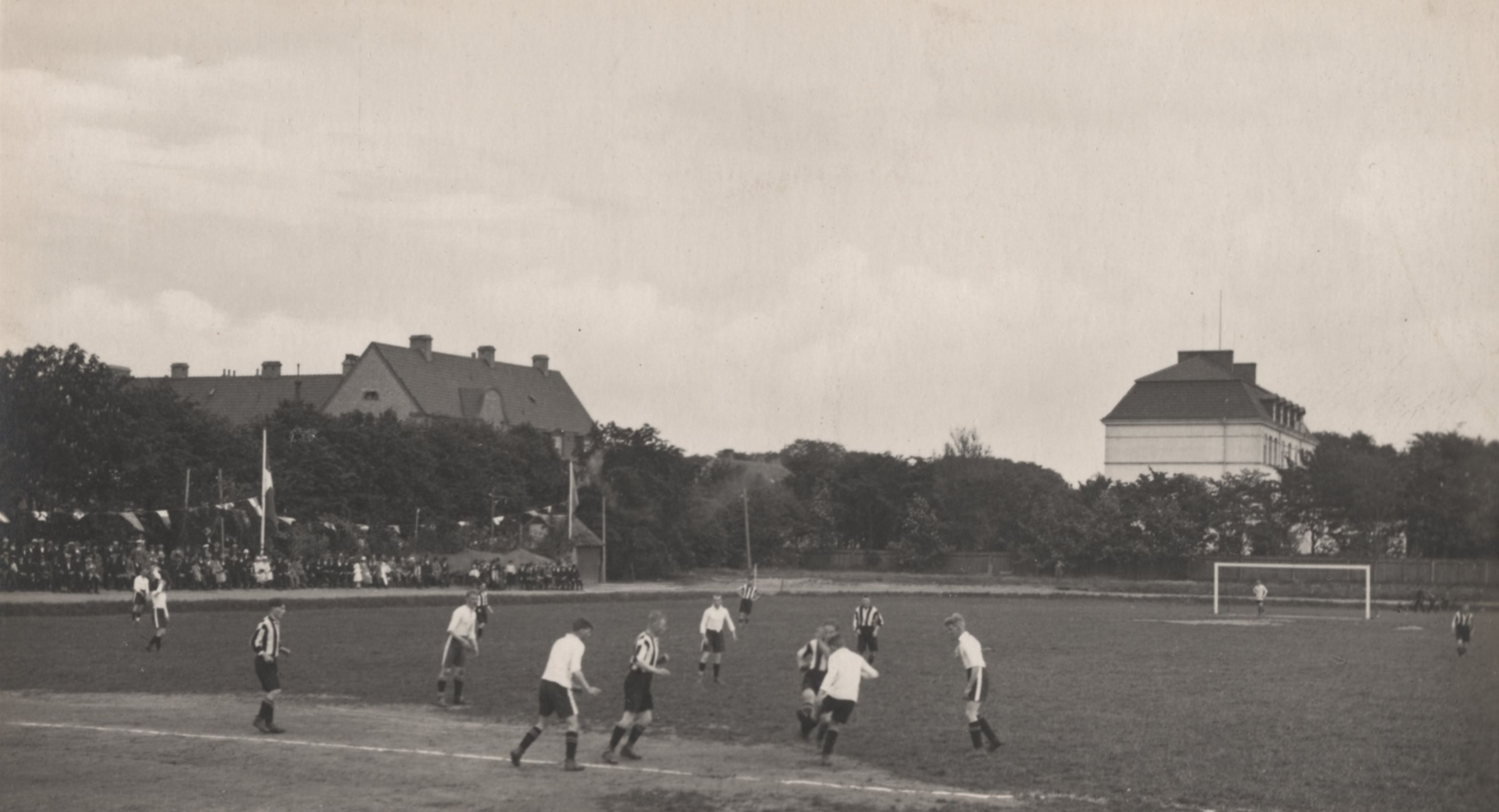
Eventually also football was played at "Banan". Photo from 1920.

However, despite early success within football, it would not be GF Idrott that would become the main local football club.

Landskrona BoIS, the 1915 merger of Diana and IFK Landskrona, soon became the only football club in the town, all other football playing squads just belonged to a team without organisation. The club used the middle of the cycling track as pitch for their home matches, and Banan became the first home of Landskrona BoIS.

Just 9 years later, in 1924, a new sports ground, Landskrona IP, was inaugurated. It completely replaced Banan within a few years, and Landskrona BoIS became, in the same year, one of the twelve clubs that participated in the first Allsvenskan, the finest assembly within Swedish football. Banan was located only a kilometre from the town's centre, but the new arena was built outside the city limits of its time.

It is difficult to find out of exactly when Banan was closed. But it was presumably not until after the last stationary military units had left the town, on 2 October 1926. From around 1927 did the former military exercise area partly became available for new football pitches. And these are located rather close to where Banan once lay. Buildings from the early 1930s are partly located over the old venue and so is a part of the street Säbygatan.
