= Heini Vatnsdal =

Faroese footballer

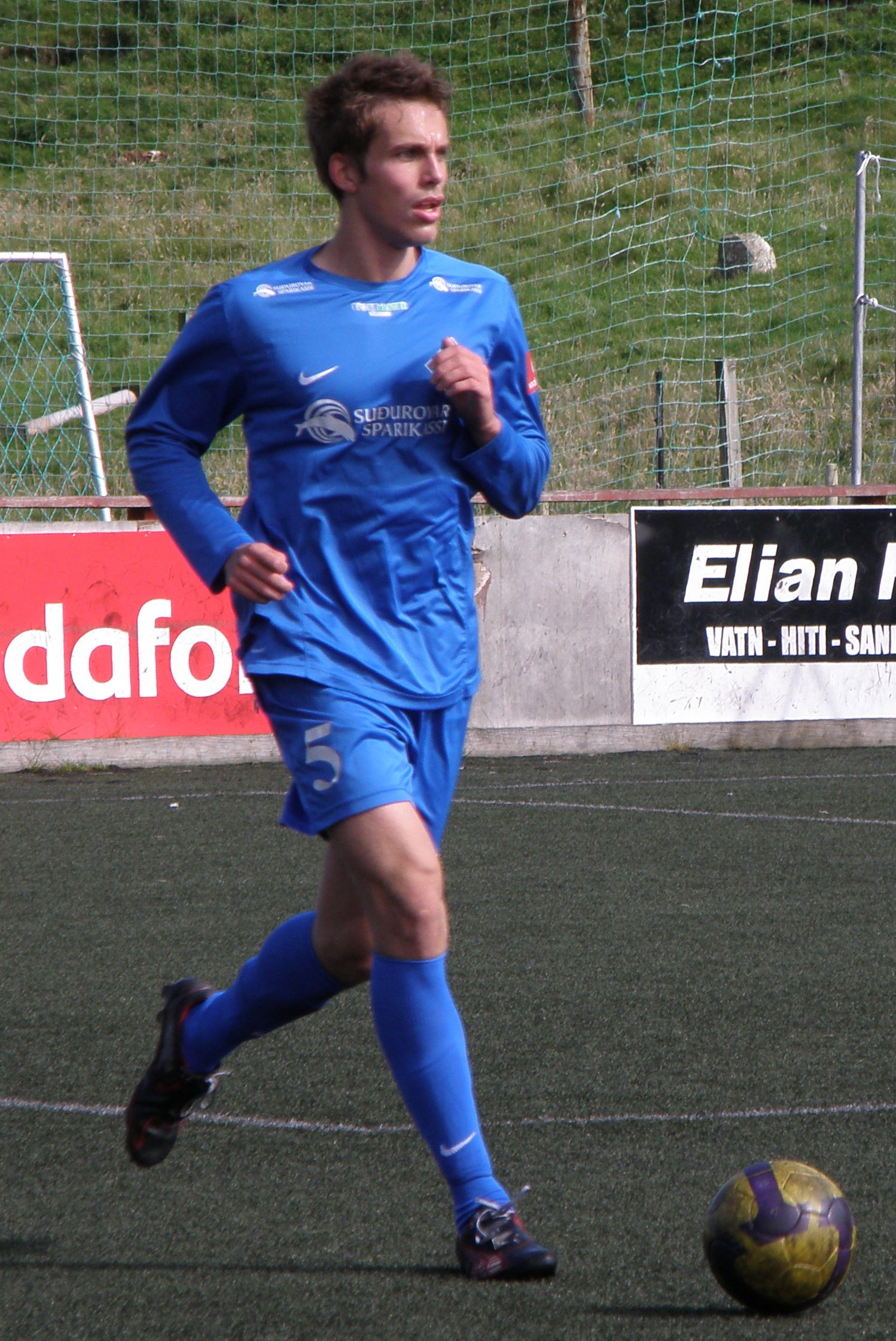
- Heini Vatnsdal while in a match for FC Suðuroy vs. B36 on 22 August 2010.

Personal information
- Full name: Heini Vatnsdal
- Date of birth: 18 October 1991 (age 35)
- Place of birth: Faroe Islands
- Position: Defender

Team information
- Current team: B36 Tórshavn
- Number: 23

Senior career*
Years	Team	Apps	(Gls)
2008	VB/Sumba	2	(0)
2009	VB/Sumba	18	(2)
2010–2012	FC Suðuroy	70	(5)
2013–2015	HB Tórshavn	53	(10)
2015–2020	Fremad Amager	105	(3)
2020–2024	KÍ Klaksvík	71	(6)
2025–	B36 Tórshavn	27	(0)

International career^{‡}
2005–06	Faroe Islands U15	9	(4)
2007–08	Faroe Islands U17	10	(1)
2009	Faroe Islands U19	0	(0)
2010–12	Faroe Islands U21	6	(0)
2013–	Faroe Islands	39	(1)
- * Club domestic league appearances and goals as of 1 November 2026 ‡ National team caps and goals as of 8 October 2026

Heini Vatnsdal (born 18 October 1991) is a Faroese professional football player. He currently plays for B36 Tórshavn and for the Faroe Islands national football team. He plays as a defender.

Vatnsdal has also played for the youth teams of the Faroe Islands: Faroe Islands U21 U17 and U15. Vatnsdal has scored goals for Faroe Islands U15 and U17 teams.

== Career ==
=== Club ===
Vatnsdal started his football career on the southernmost of the islands of the Faroe Islands, Suðuroy, where he played for FC Suðuroy until he signed a contract in 2013 with HB Tórshavn, where he played for three seasons. In 2015 he moved to Denmark to study as well as to play football. He signed a contract with the Copenhagen club Fremad Amager which played in the second best tier in Danish football. At that time he had played six matches for the Faroe Islands national team. He played for the club for five years and played 105 matches for the club in 1. division. Hans last match for Fremad Amager was against Vejle Boldklub, which Fremad Amager won 4-1 and ended the season as number four.

In July 2020 Vatnsdal moved back to the Faroe Islands with his family. He signed with the Faroese champions KÍ Klaksvík. He became a part of the squad which should play in Champions League against ŠK Slovan Bratislava, a match which was postponed because one of the staff members tested positive for COVID-19 after arrival to the Faroe Islands, and then a new group of players arrived but again one person, this time a player, tested positive, and finally UEFA decided that KÍ should win 3-0 without playing. KÍ's next match was against Young Boys in the second qualification round, which KÍ lost 1–3.

On 24 September 2020, KÍ became the first Faroese team to qualify for the Europa League playoff round by beating the Georgian champions Dinamo Tbilisi 6–1 in the third qualifying round of Europa League, which was also KÍ's first time in that round. Vatnsdal played all 90 minutes.

=== International ===
Heini Vatnsdal has played matches for his country in the as well as the Faroe Islands national football team. Vatnsdal had his debut on the Faroe Islands national football team on 7 June 2013 in an away match against The Republic of Ireland. Ireland won 3–0. Vatnsdal played all 90 minutes. He has also played for most of the youth teams of the Faroese national teams.

- U21 – In August 2010 Heini Vatnsdal was chosen to be one of the U21 team members in the match against Andorra. Vatnsdal was an unused substitute in the match, which Faroe Islands U21 won 3–1. The team now has 11 points; it is the first time any Faroese national team reaches point with two digits.
- U19 – Vatnsdal was appointed for the Faroe Islands U19 team for the matches which were played in Serbia in October 2009. Vatnsdal didn't play any of the matches on that occasion.
- U17 – Heini Vatnsdal went to Aberdeen in Scotland with Faroe Islands U17 in July 2007 for the Aberdeen International Football Festival. The team did very well, they won the competition. Heini Vatnsdal scored a goal in the final, which was against Dundee United; the result of that match was 2–1, Vatnsdal scored the second goal for the team. Vatnsdal also played other matches for the U17 team. He played in the match against Northern Ireland on 21 October 2006 in Windsor Park. The result of the match was 1–0. Northern Ireland scored just before the match ended. Vatnsdal played for the Faroe Islands U17 team on 5 August 2006 in Tórshavn against Norway. Faroe Islands lost the match 0–5.
- U15 – Heini Vatnsdal played 6 matches for Faroe Islands U15 in Aberdeen at the Aberdeen International Football Festival 2006 and one match against the Scottish club Albion B.C. (Albion Boys Club) on 18 July 2005. Faroe Islands won the match against Albion 1–3.

== International goals ==
No	Date	Venue	Opponent	Score	Result	Competition
1.	7 September 2021	Tórsvøllur, Tórshavn, Faroe Islands	Moldova	2–0	2–1	2022 FIFA World Cup qualification
