= Thomas Hickersberger =

Austrian footballer and coach

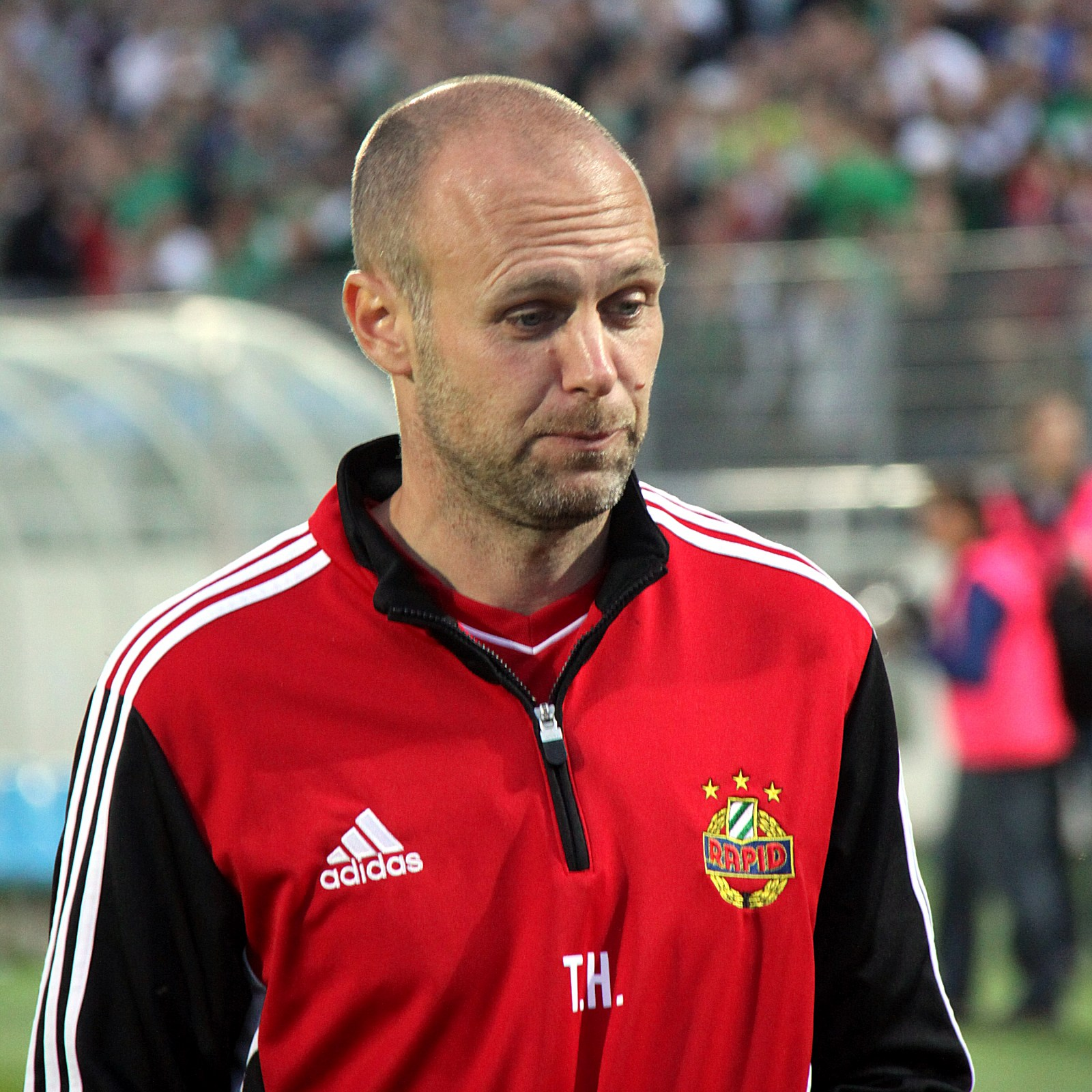
- Hickersberger in 2011

Personal information
- Date of birth: 21 August 1973 (age 53)
- Place of birth: Offenbach, West Germany
- Height: 1.80 m (5 ft 11 in)
- Position: Defender

Youth career
- 1982–1992: Rapid Wien

Senior career*
Years	Team	Apps	(Gls)
1992–1993	Rapid Wien II		
1993–1994	Favoritner AC		
1994–1996	First Vienna FC	14	(1)
1996	Wiener Sportklub	3	(0)
1996–1997	First Vienna FC	18	(1)
1997–1999	SK Vorwärts Steyr	31	(1)
1999–2001	SC Bregenz	23	(1)
2001	VfB Admira Wacker Mödling	21	(0)
2002	SV Austria Salzburg	9	(1)
2003–2004	FAC Team für Wien	41	(1)
2004–2006	Wiener Sportklub	41	(2)
2009	First Vienna FC	7	(0)

International career
2002	Austria	1	(0)

Managerial career
- 2007–2010: First Vienna (assistant)
- 2010–2011: Admira Wacker (U16)
- 2011–2016: Rapid Wien (assistant)
- 2017: SCR Altach (assistant)
- 2018–2013: Rapid Wien (assistant)
- 2021: Rapid Wien (caretaker)
- * Club domestic league appearances and goals

Thomas Hickersberger (born 21 August 1973) is an Austrian football coach and former player. He made one appearance for the Austria national team in 2002.

== Personal life ==
He is the son of manager Josef Hickersberger.

== Honours ==
- Austrian First League: 1997–98
