= Helgi Dam Ziska =

Faroese chess grandmaster (born 1990)

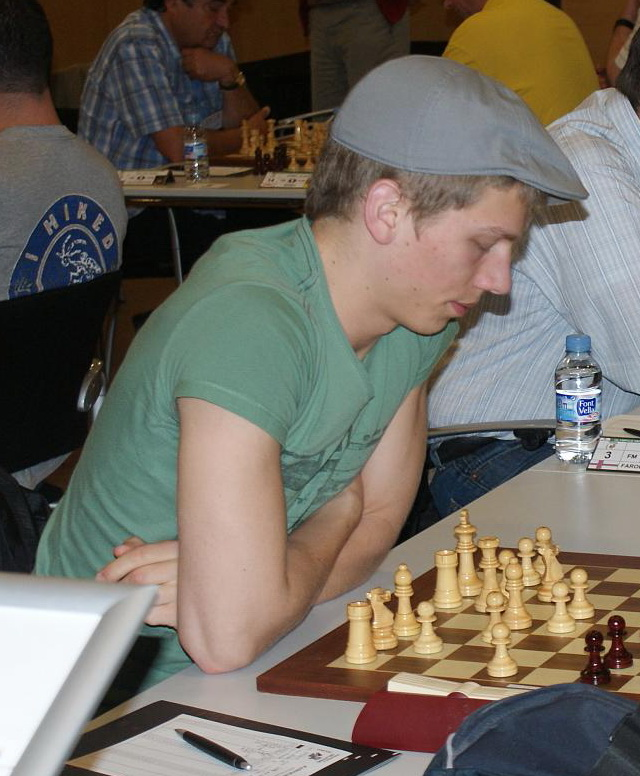
- Helgi Dam Ziska, 2009

Personal information
- Born: 27 July 1990 (age 35) Tórshavn, Faroe Islands

Chess career
- Country: Faroe Islands
- Title: Grandmaster (2017)
- FIDE rating: 2542 (July 2026)
- Peak rating: 2555 (December 2016)

Helgi Dam Ziska (born 27 July 1990) is a Faroese chess Grandmaster. He is the first Faroese player to qualify for the Grandmaster title. Ziska is the top ranked and the highest ever rated player from his federation, and has been rated number one amongst Faroese chess players since the age of 16. He has competed at the Chess Olympiad since 2006, representing the Faroe Islands.

== Chess career ==
Helgi Dam Ziska was awarded the title International Master (IM) by FIDE in 2007. He achieved the norms required for the title at the Politiken Cup in July 2005, the Reykjavik Open in March 2006, and the Hogeschool Zeeland Tournament in June 2006.

In 2006 he competed at the Chess Olympiad for the first time. In 2013, Ziska gained his first norm required for the GM title at the Riga Technical University Open 2013. At the same competition in Riga, he won the blitz event (Tournament D) with a score of 9.5/11 points.

Ziska has won the Faroese championship several times. Ziska won the Nordic Junior Chess Championship in 2006 for boys born in 1989 and 1990. In 2007 he took bronze and in 2008 he took silver together with Høgni Egilstoft Nielsen at the Nordic Junior Chess Championship. In 2009 he became Nordic Junior Champion in the oldest age group at the competition which was held in Ziska's hometown Tórshavn that year. In 2010 Anatoly Karpov visited the Faroe Islands, and on that occasion Ziska won against him in fast chess, but also lost against him.

Ziska finished second at the Copenhagen Chess Challenge in 2012 and 2014. He was second at the 2013 Danish Chess Championship, behind Davor Palo.

In April 2016 Ziska won the 2nd European Small Nations Individual Chess Championship in Luxembourg City to qualify to participate at the Chess World Cup 2017.

== Honour ==
- 2006 - Sportsman of the Year 2006 in The Faroe Islands
