= Aberdeen International Football Festival =

The Aberdeen International Football Festival (AIFF) was an international association football festival in Aberdeen, Scotland. The festival was launched in 1981. Over the years, the festival has become something of an institution in the city's calendar, bringing together, as it does, young people from a host of other countries, far and near, and the citizens of Aberdeen who turn up, whatever the weather, at Seaton Park to witness and support this unique sporting occasion. Mindful of its motto, 'Football is Fun', the festival is as much concerned with promoting fun and friendship as it is about competing on the football field, although success in that area is also a worthy aim in the development of our adults of the future. The event ended in 2010 after a decline of attendances and financial difficulties.

== Aberdeen International Football Festivals ==
=== Aberdeen International Football Festival 2010 ===
The winners of the football competitions 2010: The winners of boys 16 was Celtic, and the winners of boys 14 was Motherwell. The winner of the girls' football competition was Aberdeen-East End.

*Final results

- Boys 16’s (Jack Wood Trophy) - Celtic 3 (Herron, Chalmers, Davidson) Hibs 0
- Boys 14’s (First Oil Cup) - Falkirk 1 (McLaughlin) Motherwell 3 (Higgins, McDonald, Anderson)
- Girls (Lord Provost’s Cup) - Aberdeen-East End 3 (N. Brown 2, Centre) Buchan Quines 1 (McCouaig)

=== Aberdeen International Football Festival 2009 ===
Final results:

- Boys 16 - Keith 1 Ross County 6
- Boys 14 - Aberdeen 2 Dundee United 1
- Girls - Aberdeen FC Girls United 3 East End 1

=== Aberdeen International Football Festival 2008 ===
Final results in football:

- Boys 16 Clermond Ferrand 3 (Belfodil 2, Benmamar) Stornoway 0
- Boys 14 - Dundee United 4 (Ferguson, Quail, Kelly(pen), Gilmour(pen)) Lewis United 0
- Girls Aberdeen 7 (McDonald 3, Pietsch og, Brown, Ridgeway, Mutch) Regensburg 0

Other results

- 5-a-sides – Girls: Old Bens; Boys 16's – Shetland;
- Ten Pin Bowling – Girls – Teresa Kreusel (Regensburg); Boys 16's – Kieran Heads (Cove Rangers);
- Soccer Tennis – Girls: Aberdeen FC Girls Utd; Boys 14's: Faroe Islands A; Boys 16's: Cove Rangers A.
- It’s A Knockout – Girls – Old Bens; Boys 14 – Shetland; Boys 16 – Stornoway Utd.
- Penalty Kicks – Girls: Yvonne Wagenknacht-Hirth (Regensburg); Boys 14: Isak Simonsen (Faroe Islands); Boys 16 – Alexis Carmo (Claremond Ferrand).
- Top scorer – Aimee Ridgeway (Aberdeen FC Utd Girls).
- Fair Play – Deveronvale
- Player of the Tournament - Alexis Carmo (Claremond Ferrand)
- Corporate 6's - RBG

=== Aberdeen International Football Festival 2007 ===
Faroe Islands won the football competitions for boys 16 and for boys 14 at the Aberdeen International Football Festival 2007. Aberdeen won the competition for the girls.

Final results in football:

- Boys 16s - Dundee Utd 1 (Elfverson), Faroe Islands 2 (Jacobsen, Vatnsdal)
- Boys 14s - Aberdeen 0, Faroe Islands 1 (Getsson, pen)
- Girls - Aberdeen 3 (Reid, Smith, Peddle), East End 1 (Robb)

Other results

- Corporate 6s - Reel Group 1, Royal Mail (Mail Centre) 0
- Five-a-sides - Boys 16s: Faroe Islands B, Boys 14s: Faroe Islands B, Girls: Aberdeen F.C.
- Top goalscorers - Ross Allan (Caithness United), Cameron Howie (Dundee United) 6
- Fair Play Trophy - Shetland United
- Player of the tournament - Gilli Sørensen (Faroe Islands)

=== Aberdeen International Football Festival 2006 ===
In 2006 Datus 1 won the Boys 16 competition and Faroe Islands won the Boys 14 competition.

Final results 2006, Football (soccer)

- Boys 16 - Datus 1, Faroe Islands 0
- Boys 14 - Faroe Islands 2, Ross County 0

Result from other events

- Corporate 6s - CapRock 1, Paull & Williamson 0
- Boys 14 Its-A-Knockout - Stornoway Utd.
- Boys 14 Soccer Tennis - Faroe Islands 'C' - Sørmund Kalsø, Brynleif Hansen, Jógvan Rói Davidsen, Remi Langgaard
- Boys 14 5-A-Side - Faroe Islands 'A' Sørmund Kalsø, Brynleif Hansen, Thomas Thomsen, Ivan Joensen, Jógvan Ólavsson, Ludvík Súnason
- Boys 14 Penalty Kicks - Jordan Low, Team Orkney, scored all 5
- Boys 16 10-Pin Bowling - LiamCowie, Keith FC
- Boys 16 Its-A-Knockout - Datus Soccer Academy (Ghana)
- Boys 16 Soccer Tennis - Aberdeen 'B': Scott Ross, Peter Pawlett, Ryan Jack, Matthew Robertson
- Boys 16 5-A-Side - Faroe Islands 'B' : Páll Klettskarð, Erling Jacobsen, Hans Jørgensen, Erland Berg Danielson
- Boys 16 Penalty Kicks - Stornoway Utd: Scott MacLaen
- Fair Play Trophy - Shetland 14 and 16 (No Yellow cards)
- Player of the Tournament - Chris Anderson Award - Victor Lartey ( Datus Soccer Academy, Ghana)
- Top Goal Scorer:
- Boys 14: Helgi Samson, Faroe Islands, 11 goals
- Boys 16: Scott Grant, Keith FC, 10 goals
