= European Club Cup =

European Club Cup could refer to one of the following:

- European Chess Club Cup: chess tournament for club teams from Europe
- European Club Cup: name of the Champions League (Judo) until 2009
- European Club Cup of Champions, Table tennis
