= Landskrona IP =

Football stadium in Sweden

Coordinates: 55.889934°N 12.83761°E

- I.P
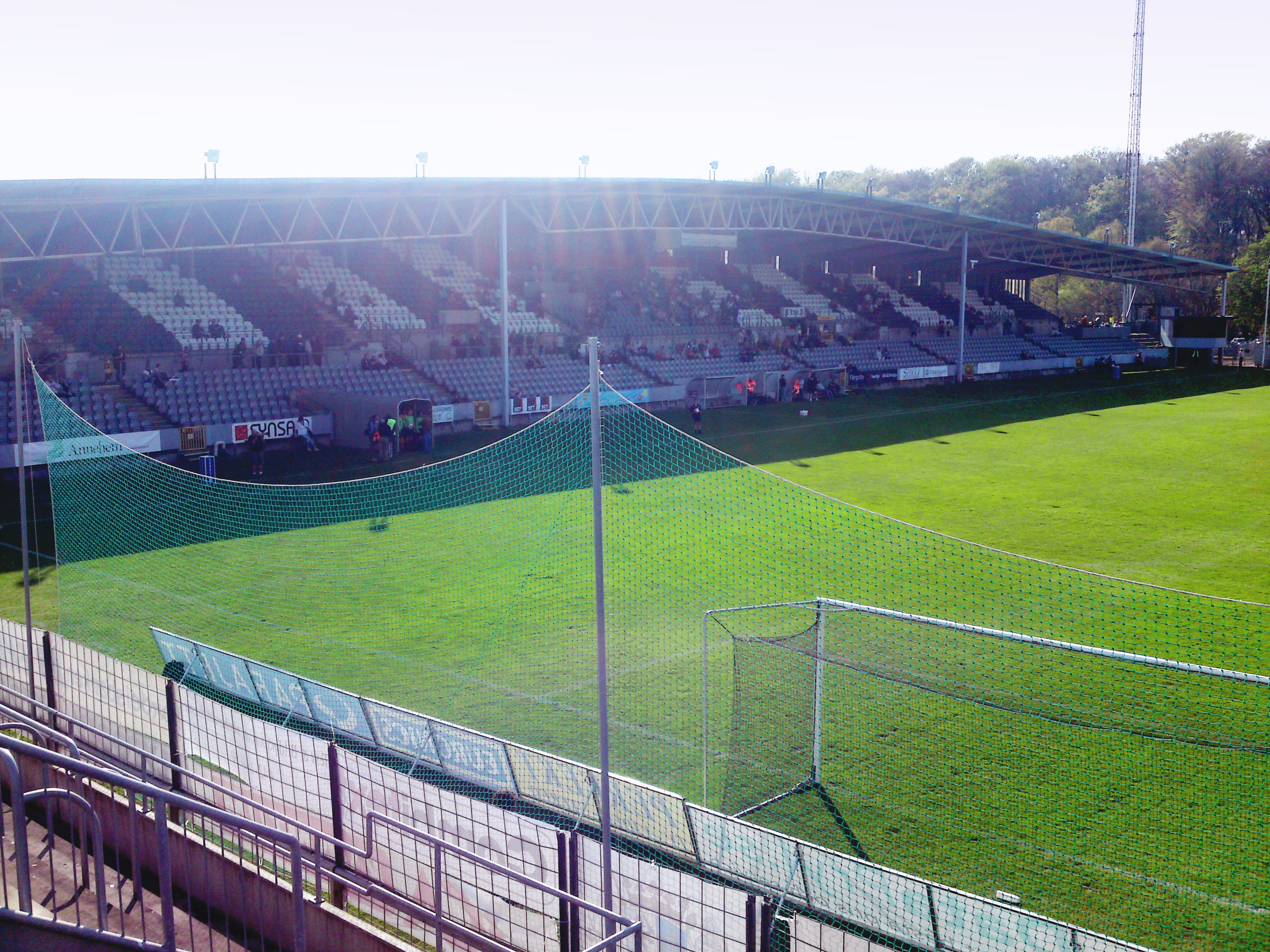
- The southern grandstand in April 2009

- Location within Sweden
- Location: Landskrona, Sweden
- Capacity: 10,000 (2017)
- Record attendance: 18,544, qualification to Allsvenskan 18 October 1959
- Field size: 105 x 68 meters (2017)

Construction
- Opened: 20 July 1924

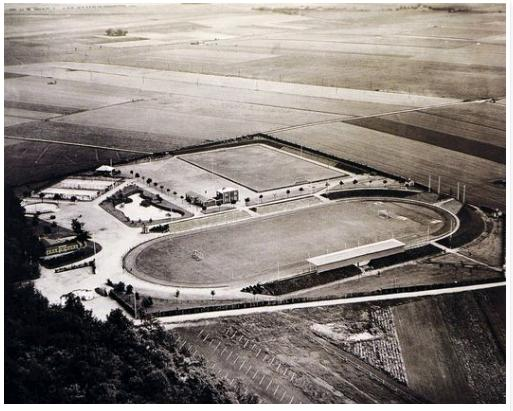
Aerial view of Landskrona IP around the inauguration in 1924

Landskrona IP (short for "Landskrona Idrottsplats" or "Landskrona Sports Ground" and locally known as "I.P.") is a football stadium which serves as the home of the Landskrona BoIS football club. The stadium holds approximately 10,000 spectators, 3,500 of whom are accommodated in covered seats on the south terrace. On the same site there are smaller football pitches and facilities for other sports including tennis. The venue is owned by Landskrona Municipality.

Landskrona IP was inaugurated on 20 July 1924 with a soccer game between Landskrona BoIS and B 1903, where the away team won, 3–2. It replaced the former Landskrona sports ground Banan. Aside from Landskrona BoIS' home games, it has hosted one Swedish friendly match, as well as some matches in the 1974 UEFA European Under-18 Championship. All four of the Faroe Islands' home qualifications games for the UEFA Euro 1992 tournament were played at the stadium.

== History of the stadium ==
=== Inauguration and early years ===
The venue was formally inaugurated by Crown Prince Gustav Adolf on 20 July 1924. Landskrona IP replaced the Banan sports ground, where the pitch was in the middle of a cycling track. Landskrona IP was located just east of the Karlslund beech forest, 3–4 km north of the town centre.

The southern grandstand had seats only, but was originally only partly covered. At the northern side and behind the eastern curve terraces were constructed of earthwork, stones and some concrete. Parts of the eastern side were grass-covered earthwork and the western side had no stands of any kind. The entire seating grandstand was covered during the spring of 1939, but the total capacity remained at around 10,000.

Allsvenskan, the Swedish top football league, began in 1924–25, with Landskrona BoIS as one of its twelve original clubs. The club's inclusion in the new league was in large part due to the new stadium which, by 1924 standards, was considered as modern and suitable for football.

=== 1950s to 1970s ===
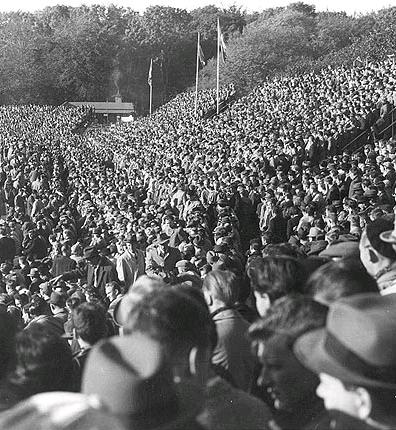
The north terraced stand during the late 1950s.

Sometime in the mid 1950s the northern terraced stand was enlarged by the construction of a slightly steeper section in stainless steel and wood, built top of the concrete and earthworks. This new section approximately doubled the stand's capacity. During the subsequent 20 attendance reached 10,000 or more on 20–25 occasions, and on at least nine of those occasions the attendance was above 15,000. The all-time record attendance of 18,535 spectators was set during a qualification game for Allsvenskan in 1959.

In the mid 1960s four floodlight pillars were erected. After some of the pillars fell during strong winds a year or two later they were re-erected and secured by a system of steel cables.

After the last Allsvenskan home game in 1972 the southern grandstand was demolished. The replacement concrete Grandstand with 4,000 seats opened at the opening home game of the 1973 season. The new stand had approximately 2,200 covered seats and 1,800 seats without cover. For matches with high demand for seating temporary benches were placed at the clay tracks, which gave a total of close to 6,000 seats.

Until 1989 the arena had clay tracks for athletics. The stadium was of little use for athletics, however, as the tracks were both narrow and shorter than the optimal 400 meters. The running tracks were mainly used by nearby schools.

=== The 1990–1991 reconstruction ===
In 1990 the stadium's owner, Landskrona Municipality, removed the tracks after requests by Landskrona BoIS. The 1973 seated stand was now longer than the pitch and as a result some seats were removed. The northern long side terrace stand was rebuilt in concrete and lower wooden terraces were mounted behind both short sides of the stadium; all three terraced sides remained uncovered. The maximum capacity was reduced to around 11,000. As of May 2017 the only parts of the 1924 stadium remaining are two flagpoles and the arch which originally constituted the entrance.

=== 1990s to 2010s ===
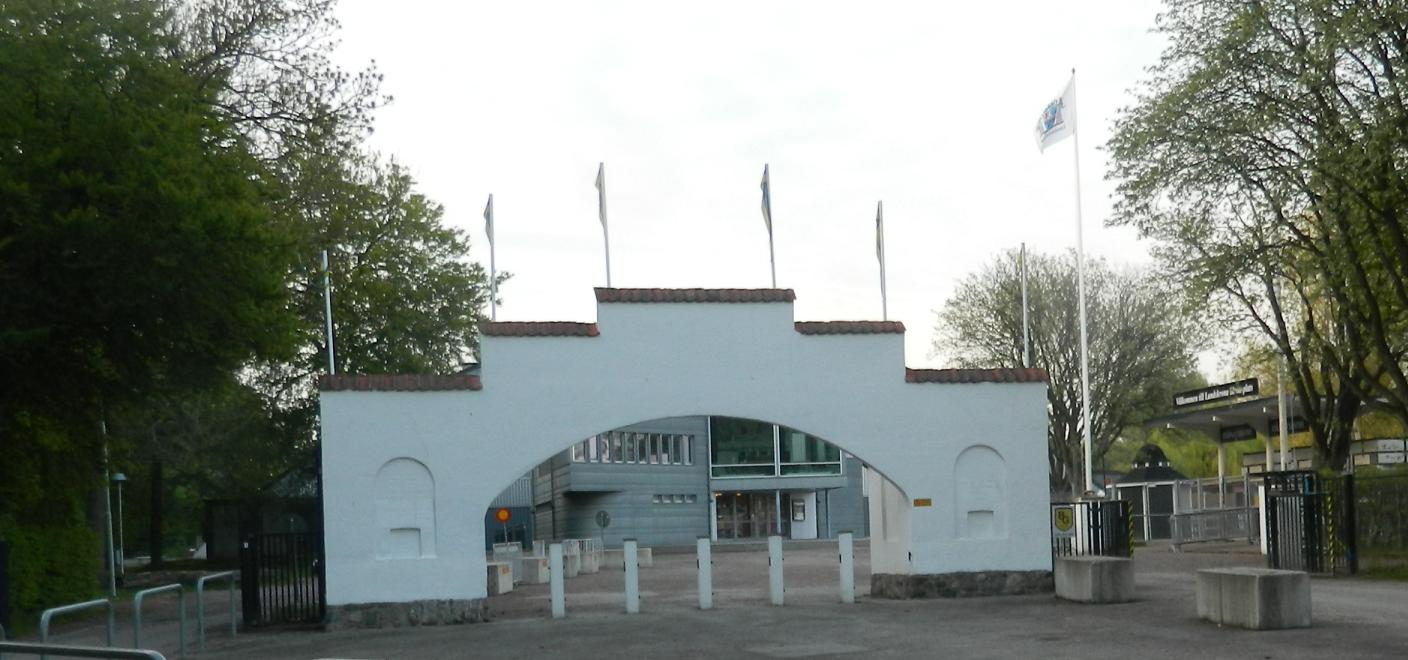
The former entrance arch

Landskrona municipality planned to build a roof on top of the northern long side terraces before the 1998 season, however the new board, with Kenneth Håkansson as chairman, argued that the money was needed elsewhere. Before Landskrona BoIS' 2002 return to Allsvenskan two concrete terraces were brought into use at the eastern side, together with two temporary constructions behind the opposite goal in steel and wood. These were initially intended for the season premiere only and were removed afterwards. The replacement of the original benches with individual seats reduced the seating capacity.

The 2002 season opening against Helsingborgs IF was the first Allsvenskan match at Landskrona IP since 1994, and drew 11,909 spectators, with Landskrona winning by six goals to two. After the police had to close the gates to the full stadium against AIK later that year, the mobile stands were reinstated. In the spring of 2003 Landskrona BoIS paid for a permanent western concrete terrace, which was replaced again with a building in 2011.

Around 2005 Landskrona BoIS proposed plans for reconstruction of the stadium. When completed there would have been capacity for 12,000 spectators in total, with 8000 seats, and roofs covering all spectator areas. However discussions with the municipality proved fruitless. An alternative plan, under consideration in 2011 and 2012, was a privately funded stadium including a hotel, restaurant and housing. That plan failed after the developer withdrew.

During autumn 2013, the board and previous chairman of the club announced that the grass pitch was to be replaced with artificial turf. The decision was met by protests from supporters of the club and in November 2013 the municipality instead decided to invest in ground heating. The new pitch was inaugurated in April 2014.

== International games ==
=== Sweden vs Estonia in 1929 ===
The Swedish football team played at Landskrona IP once, against Estonia on 7 July 1929. The result was 4–1, and several Landskrona BoIS players were on the pitch.

=== 1974 UEFA Youth tournament ===
This tournament for boys up to the age of 17 was hosted by southern Sweden, and two games were played at Landskrona IP. The Group D game between Sweden and Portugal (which ended in a 1-0 Swedish victory) and one of the semi-finals were played at Landskrona IP. In the latter Yugoslavia defeated Greece 1:0. All 4000 seats were sold and split equally. The terraces were available to local residents only but very few attended, owing to poor weather.

=== Faroe Islands Euro 1992 qualification home ===
During the qualifications for Euro 1992, the Faroe Islands participated for the first time in international football. No UEFA-approved grass pitch arena existed on the islands, and they chose Landskrona IP as their temporary home ground. Their first match at Landskrona IP was a 1-0 victory against Austria on 12 September 1990. Another three international competition games were played at Landskrona IP, against Denmark, Yugoslavia and Northern Ireland.

== Other facilities ==
Apart from the stadium, the facility has several other football pitches. The so-called B-pitch has terrace stands of for about 6000 attenders and is the home pitch for BK Landora. The stadium pitch and the B-pitch have natural grass. There are also two pitches with artificial turf and minor floodlights and another four grass pitches. Four smaller grass pitches are available for Korpfotboll, a 7-men football variant played in Sweden. Since these pitches are heavily used during the season (late April until mid September), they move around within a larger field. If necessary, the Korpfotboll field can be used as four full-size football pitches.

As well as football pitches there are six clay tennis courts, a modern athletics field, an indoor ice rink, and an indoor arena for handball, basketball, table tennis and wrestling. Below the stadium's south stand there are an indoor 25-metre swimming pool and an adventure bath. All of these facilities are owned by Landskrona municipality and are available for public use. A greyhound racing pitch equipped with floodlights also exists, but is not currently in use.

The floodlight system at the stadium 823 lux of illumination. It consists of four 30-metre-high (98 ft) pillars and additional lights at the roof of the south stand.
