= Faroe Islands national football team =

Association football team

Faroe Islands
- Nickname: Landsliðið (The National Team)
- Association: Fótbóltssamband Føroya (FSF)
- Confederation: UEFA (Europe)
- Head coach: Eyðun Klakstein
- Captain: Viljormur Davidsen
- Most caps: Jóan Símun Edmundsson (100)
- Top scorer: Rógvi Jacobsen; Klæmint Olsen (10)
- Home stadium: Tórsvøllur
- FIFA code: FRO
First colours	Second colours

FIFA ranking
- Current: 123 ▲3 (18 November 2026)
- Highest: 74 (July 2015, October 2016)
- Lowest: 198 (September 2008)

First international
- Faroe Islands 1–0 Canada (Tórshavn, Faroe Islands; 2 July 1988)

Biggest win
- Faroe Islands 5–1 Liechtenstein (Tórshavn, Faroe Islands; 7 June 2021); Faroe Islands 4–0 Liechtenstein (Marbella, Spain; 22 March 2024); Faroe Islands 4–0 Montenegro (Tórshavn, Faroe Islands; 9 October 2025)

Biggest defeat
- Unofficial; Iceland 9–0 Faroe Islands (Keflavík, Iceland; 10 July 1985); Official; Yugoslavia 7–0 Faroe Islands (Belgrade, Yugoslavia; 16 May 1991); Romania 7–0 Faroe Islands (Bucharest, Romania; 6 May 1992); Faroe Islands 0–7 Norway (Toftir, Faroe Islands; 11 August 1993); Faroe Islands 1–8 FR Yugoslavia (Toftir, Faroe Islands; 6 October 1996)

Baltic Cup
- Appearances: 2 (first in 2024)
- Best result: Third place (2026)

Island Games
- Appearances: 2 (first in 1989)
- Best result: Champions (1989, 1991)

Greenland Cup
- Appearances: 3 (first in 1980)
- Best result: Champions (1983, 1984)

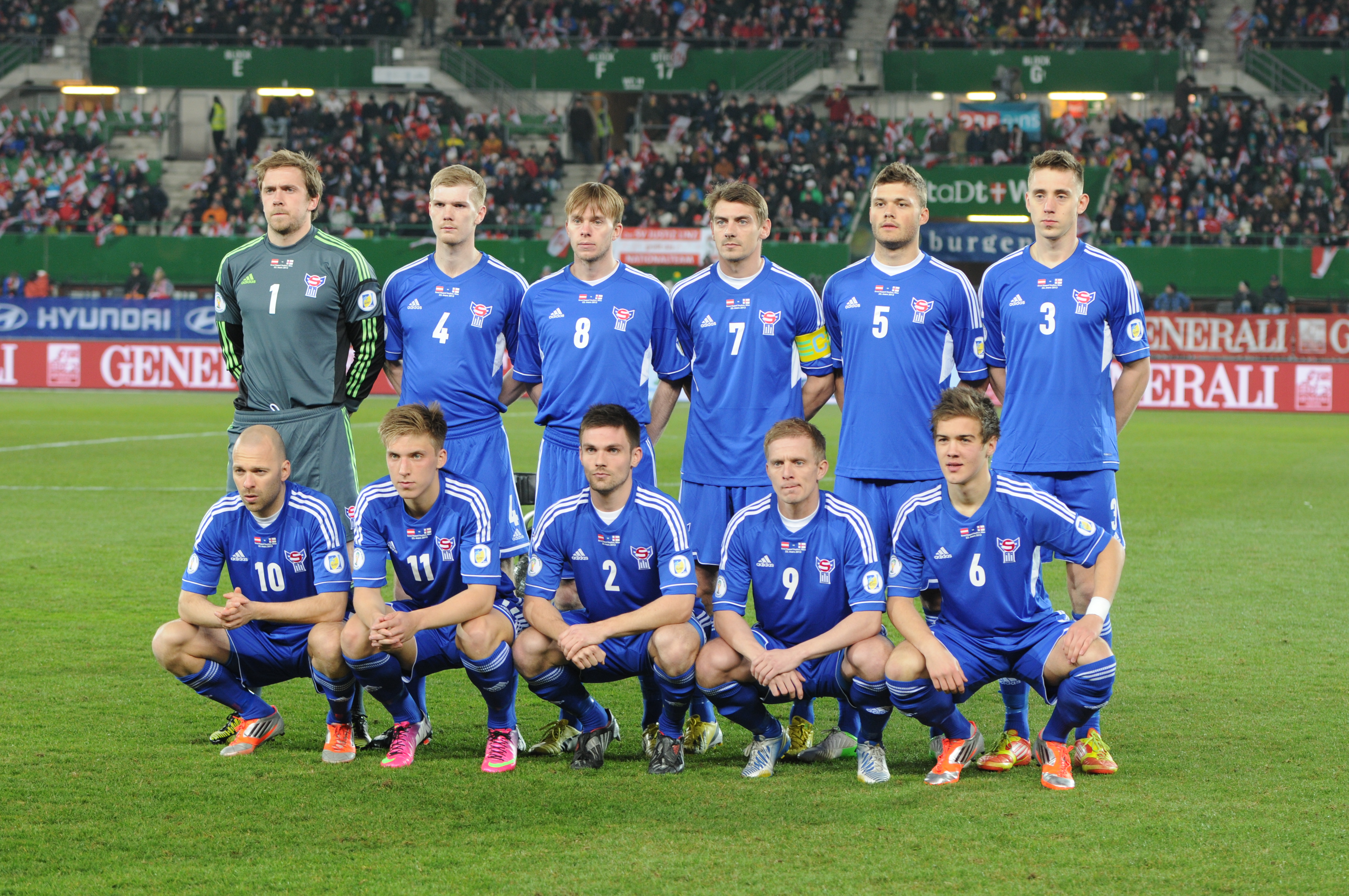
Faroe Islands national football team in March 2013

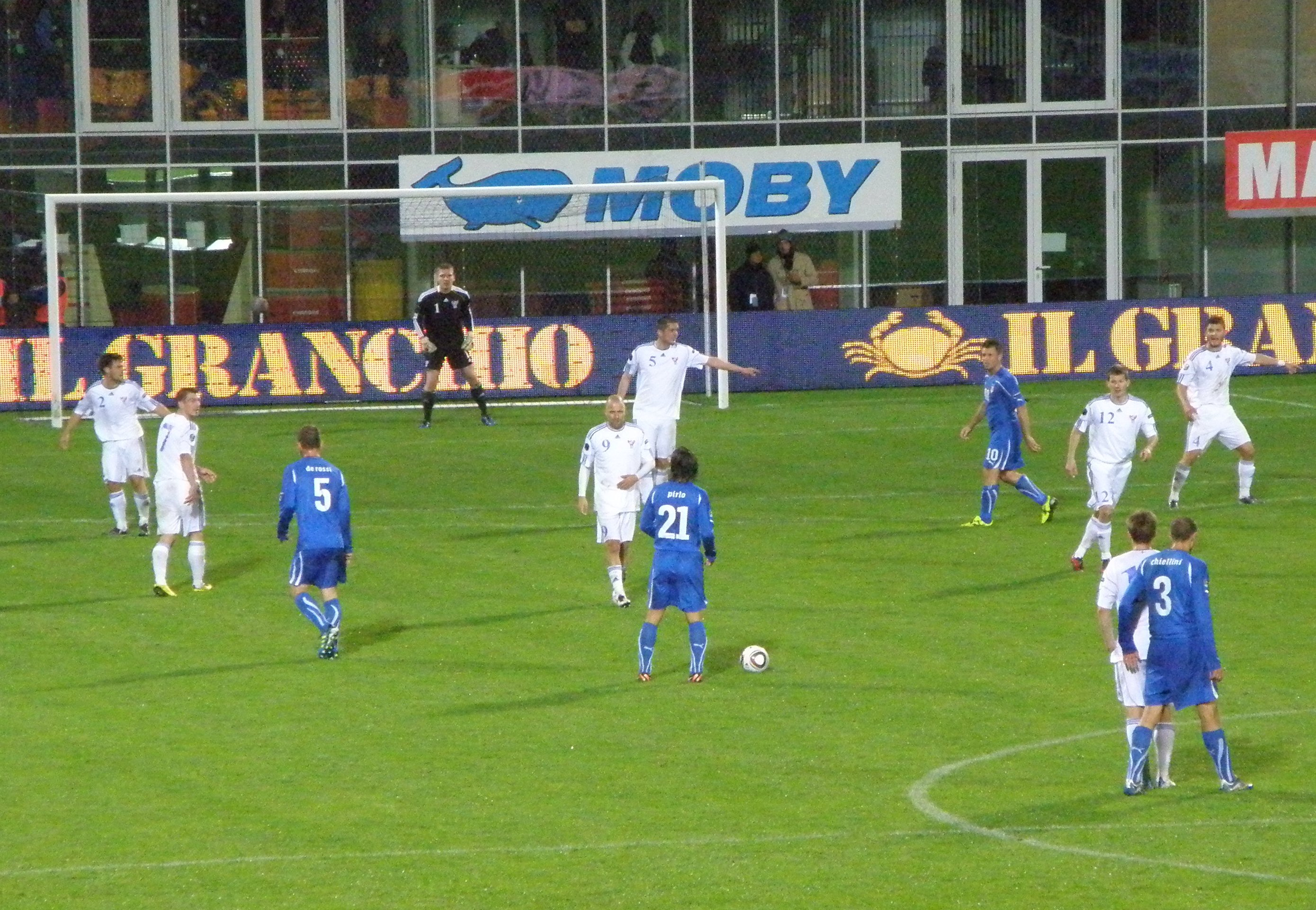
Faroe Islands playing against Italy on 2 September 2011. The match ended in a 1–0 defeat.

The Faroe Islands national football team (Faroese: Føroyska fótbóltsmanslandsliðið) represents the Faroe Islands in men's international football, and is governed by the Faroe Islands Football Association (FSF). The FSF became a member of FIFA in 1988 and UEFA in 1990 and represents the fourth-smallest UEFA country by population.

The team has never advanced to the finals of the FIFA World Cup or UEFA European Championship. They took part in the Island Games in 1989 and 1991 and won both tournaments. The team also took part in the Nordic Football Championship for the first time in 2000–01, the last time the competition was played. In 2024, they made their debut in the Baltic Cup as a guest entrant and placed fourth. In the Faroe Islands, the team is known as the landsliðið. Home matches are played at Tórsvøllur.

== History ==
=== Early years (1930–1988) ===
From 1930 to 1988 before joining FIFA, the Faroe Islands gameplay was limited to national friendly matches against Iceland, Shetland, Orkney Islands, Greenland and Denmark U-21. None of these matches was sanctioned by FIFA, nor the Faroe Islands Football Association.

The Faroe Islands tied Iceland for the most successful team at the friendly Greenland Cup tournament with two wins back-to-back in 1983 and 1984.

=== International membership and the miracle of Landskrona (1988–1993) ===
The FSF gained FIFA membership on 2 July 1988 and the team's first official victory was a 1–0 win in a friendly match against Canada the next year. The next year, the FSF joined the UEFA on 18 April 1990.

The Faroe Islands participated in two Island Games, winning both tournaments in 1989 and 1991. They never entered the tournament again, as the opponent teams were considered too weak a match for the Faroese side.

The Faroe Islands made football history on 12 September 1990 when they beat Austria 1–0 in their first-ever competitive international. The game, a Euro 92 qualifier, was played in Landskrona, Sweden because there were no grass pitches on the Faroe Islands at the time. Torkil Nielsen—a chess player and salesman for his local building company—scored the lone game-winning goal. 32-year-old national coach Páll Guðlaugsson became a folk hero overnight and is today remembered by his players as a fearless character who believed, against the odds, that the Faroe Islands could get a result against their bigger nation opponents. In his autobiography, national goalkeeper Jens Martin Knudsen revealed that Guðlaugsson gave a stirring pre-match speech that boosted the team's confidence prior to the match against the Austrians. Guðlaugsson told the players, "Think of the Faroese flag. Your flag. Take it with you on that field. Throw yourself into the tackles against those arrogant Austrians with one mission—to win the game for your nation. Tonight you pay back your childhood home. You have the opportunity now and it is an irreparable blow if you don't seize it!" The team's underdog win remains the story most often retold about Faroese football and sports in the Faroe Islands. The Faroese victory was rated number 10 of all-time football greatest upsets by American sports magazine Soccerphile.

One month later, the Faroe Islands lost 4–1 to Denmark at Parken, Copenhagen. The same team got another good result in the qualifying tournament on 1 May 1991, when they drew 1–1 against Northern Ireland at Windsor Park. However, the Faroe Islands subsequently lost the remaining five matches of the tournament.

=== The Allan Simonsen years (1994–2001) ===
Since Landskrona, Faroese football continued its upward trajectory, regularly getting good results against stronger teams. In 1994—Allan Simonsen was appointed the new coach for the Faroese national team. Allan Simonsen spent seven years at the team's helm and is remembered as the coach who lifted the Faroese amateurs to a more professional level of play.

As a coach, he asked the FSF to lengthen the season and the Faroese clubs to screen players for talent. Both requests were granted and have become an essential part of the Faroese national team's success at the highest level of the sport.

Under the guidance of Allan Simonsen, the Faroe Islands won two Euro 1996 qualifiers matches against San Marino 3–0 and 3–1. Two years later, in the 1998 World Cup Qualifiers, the team won two 2–1 matches against Malta. In the Euro 2000 qualifiers, they played three draws—Lithuania 0–0, Scotland 1–1, and Bosnia 2–2. In 2002, the team played a 2–2 draw against Slovenia for their most successful 2002 World Cup Qualifying matches until 2018.

=== The Henrik Larsen years (2002–2005) ===
The role was given to former Danish international and UEFA Euro 1992-winning player, Henrik Larsen, who succeeded his countryman Allan Simonsen as head coach of the Faroe Islands national team.

On 7 September 2002, in the first match with Larsen as a coach, an experienced Faroese team played Scotland at home in a Euro 2004 qualifier. Though the Faroe Islands led Scotland 2–0 at halftime, the game ended in a 2–2 draw.

In the same qualifying tournament on 16 October 2002 at the HDI-Arena in Hannover, the Faroe Islands were close to a big upset against Germany. Unfortunately for the Faroese, the post denied them a draw in the dying seconds of the match, and the game ended 2–1 for the German side. However, the Faroe Islands managed one more draw against Cyprus on 9 October 2004 in the 2006 World Cup Qualifying match.

=== The Jógvan Martin Olsen years (2006–2008) ===
In 2006, the Faroe Islands finally got their first Faroese coach in Jógvan Martin Olsen from Toftir, who had served as an assistant coach for the Faroese national team for nine years prior to his appointment. That same year, many experienced players who had been regulars on the national squad for years retired from the team, giving Olsen's the task of building a new squad with a new generation of players. The team's turnover and inexperience affected their results, and the Faroe Islands got zero points in the Euro 2008 qualifier, their first qualification match under Olsen as head coach.

However, in the 2 June 2007 game against Italy, the Faroes netted a 77th-minute goal and surprisingly took the sluggish world champions to the limit after a 2–1 loss. Overall, the Euro 2008 qualifying campaign was disastrous for the young team, as they conceded 43 goals and scored only four (all of which were scored by the same player, Rógvi Jacobsen), and half of which were against Italy en route to losing all twelve matches, of which three of were 6–0 defeats.

During the summer of 2008, the Faroese side played two friendlies. In the 4–3 loss to Estonia on 1 June 2008, and the team is credited with their only official international match in which they scored 3 goals but lost. Later they lost 5–0 to Portugal.

Olsen remained as a coach for the first four qualification matches in the 2010 World Cup Qualifiers. After announcing the squad against the Austrian national team, Olsen announced that he was stepping down after three years in charge. Before this departure, he finally managed to get a big result with the team on 11 October 2008 against Austria. The game ended 1–1, giving the Faroe Islands their first qualifying point in four years.

=== The Brian Kerr years (2009–2011) ===
On 22 March 2009, the Faroese people witnessed their national team beat the Icelandic national team 2–1 in a friendly match, their first-ever victory over Iceland. Caretaker Heðin Askham managed the Faroese team in this match.

On 5 April 2009, former Republic of Ireland manager Brian Kerr was appointed as head coach of the team. With his charisma and Irish humour, he soon became a favourite among the Faroese football fans.

On 9 September 2009, the Faroe Islands recorded their first competitive win since the 2002 World Cup qualification stage, beating Lithuania 2–1.

On 11 August 2010, the Faroe Islands came close to an away win against Estonia during the UEFA Euro 2012 qualifiers. The Faroes took the lead in the first half with a goal by Jóan Símun Edmundsson, but Estonia managed to turn the match around with two goals in stoppage time.

Two months later, on 12 October 2010, the Faroe Islands drew 1–1 against higher-ranked Northern Ireland at Svangaskarð Stadion, Toftir. Midfielder Christian Holst scored for the Faroes in the 60th minute before Kyle Lafferty equalised 16 minutes later, earning a point for both teams.

On 7 June 2011, the Faroe Islands defeated Estonia 2–0 at Svangaskarð. Captain Fróði Benjaminsen opened the scoring from the penalty spot in the 43rd minute before Arnbjørn Hansen secured the win with a follow-up after another Benjaminsen penalty. It was the Faroe Islands' first UEFA Euro qualification win since 1995.

The Faroe Islands were drawn against Kerr's former employers, the Republic of Ireland, in Group C for the 2014 World Cup Qualifying. The other teams in the group were Germany, Sweden, Austria, and Kazakhstan.

The players liked the Irishman and they described him as a very motivating figure. His pre-match speeches were full of passion and gave the players confidence to go out and play against the very best in Europe. However, on 26 October 2011, the Faroe Islands Football Association (FSF) announced that "it was not possible to agree on a new contract with Brian Kerr". Brian Kerr stepped down as coach after unsuccessful negotiations with the FSF.

=== The Lars Olsen years and double Greek victory (2011–2019) ===
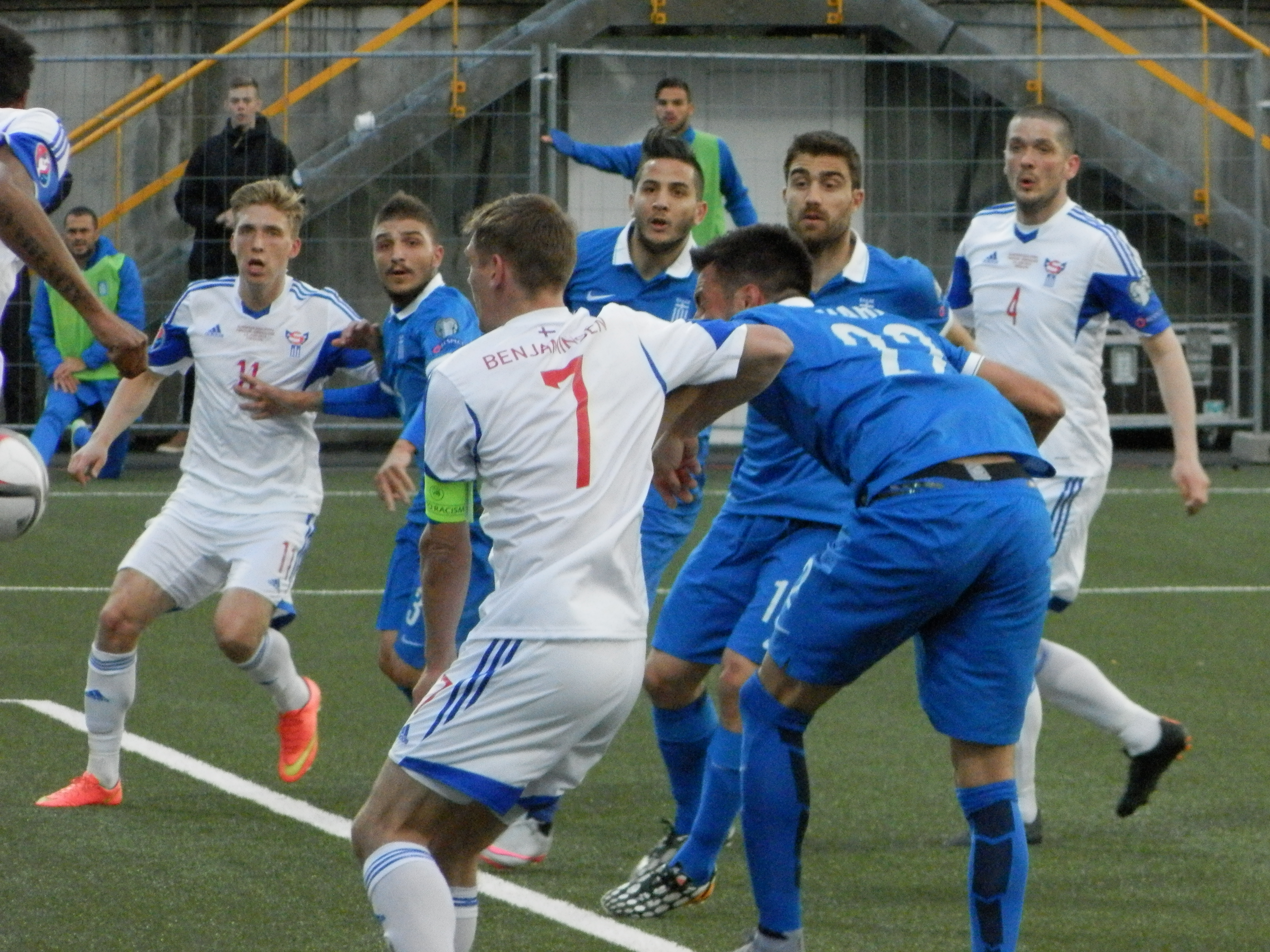
Faroe Islands defeated Greece 2–1 on 13 June 2015.

On 8 November 2011, the Faroese Football Association announced that an agreement had been reached with the 50-year-old former Denmark captain and European Champion from 1992, Lars Olsen, to become the next coach of the Faroe Islands and the third Dane at the helm, after Allan Simonsen and Henrik Larsen.

On 1 March 2014, for the first time in the Faroe Islands' history, the team scored four goals in a match. In what was only Gibraltar's second match as an official UEFA member, the hosts lost their first-ever home match by the score of 1–4. Faroe midfielder Christian Holst scored twice. On 11 October 2013, Olsen got his first point as the Faroe Islands head coach in a 1–1 draw against Kazakhstan.

On 25 September 2014, Faroese football lost one of its most promising football players, when 22-year-old Gunnar Zachariasen died in a tragic accident on board a Greenlandic fishing trawler, which had docked in Tórshavn in order to unload its cargo. The accident happened when a EUR-pallet stacked with frozen fish fell on top of Gunnar Zachariasen who died instantly. According to Rúni Nolsøe, Zachariasen's coach at EB/Streymur, Faroese football had lost a very good football player. He played 11 caps and scored 4 goals for the U21 Faroe Islands team.

On 14 November 2014, the Faroe Islands caused a major international football upset by defeating host Greece 0–1 during the Euro 2016 qualifiers. The Guardian reckoned the win as the biggest upset ever in terms of FIFA Rankings; Greece were ranked 18th, the Faroe Islands 187th, a 169-place difference.

On 13 June 2015, the Faroe Islands stunned the world yet again by defeating the same Greek side in their second meeting of the Euro 2016 qualifying tournament by a score of 2–1. These two wins saw the national team moving from 187th place to 74th place in the FIFA rankings. The team eventually finished fifth in their group with six points, without conceding more than three goals in a match.

On 29 March 2016, the Faroe Islands beat Liechtenstein 3–2 in a friendly match in Marbella, Spain. The opposition scored two late goals in stoppage time, but this was the Faroe Islands' fourth victory over Liechtenstein since 2000.

On 6 September 2016, the Faroe Islands draw 0–0 against Hungary in a 2018 World Cup Qualifying match at Tórsvøllur.

On 10 October 2016, the Faroe Islands defeated Latvia 2–0 in a 2018 World Cup Qualifying match.

On 3 September 2017, the Faroe Islands defeated Andorra 1–0 in a 2018 World Cup Qualifying match on home soil, beating their own record which was 7 points in a Euro or World Cup qualification; after the victory over Andorra the Faroe Islands reached a record nine points in all competitions.

On 18 November 2019, Lars Olsen led his team to a 0–3 loss against Sweden, in his last international match as the manager for the Faroe Islands. He's regarded as the most successful manager in the nation's 29-year history, as members of UEFA and FIFA. In the same match, captain Atli Gregersen retired from international duties as well, after winning 59 caps for the national team.

=== The Håkan Ericson years (2019–2024) ===
On 16 December 2019, the Faroe Islands Football Association announced they had signed a four-year deal with Swedish coach Håkan Ericson.

On 3 September 2020, in what would be his first match in charge, Håkan Ericson's side won 3–2 against Malta in a 2020-21 UEFA Nations League match. Only three days later, in what would be the 200th competitive match for Faroe Islands since joining FIFA and UEFA back in 1988, they recorded their second win in a row with a 1–0 win over Andorra, their first double victory since a 2–1 win against Malta on 8 June 1997.

On 17 November 2020, Ericson's side won their first-ever competitive tournament, after a 1–1 draw against Malta secured them the top spot and promotion from the 2020–21 UEFA Nations League D, followed by a new record of 12 points in all competitions, beating the previous 2018 FIFA World Cup qualification (UEFA) record at 9 points.

On 7 June 2021, the Faroese national team recorded their biggest win ever in a 5–1 friendly against Liechtenstein in Tórshavn.

On 26 September 2022, the Faroese national team defied all odds when beating Turkey 2–1 in the last game of the 2022–23 UEFA Nations League campaign. The win pushed their unbeaten record to four games, the longest streak in their history, and the result was arguably their best since the Greek Double victories of 2014 and 2015 respectively, although unlike the double Greek victories, the win against Turkey proved meaningless as Turkey had already won promotion earlier.

As of 26 September 2022, the Faroese national team has thirteen full-time professionals playing in Belgian, Norwegian, Danish, Swedish and Icelandic leagues, compared to the 1990 team who won the Austria game in Landskrona, which was entirely made up of amateurs.

The Faroe Islands played in the 2024 Baltic Cup and on 8 June 2024, they lost their semi-final match 4–1 against Estonia. They then lost 1–0 in the third place playoff against Latvia on 11 June. Ericson was fired on October 16, 2024; Eyðun Klakstein took over as interim manager. During Ericson's time as manager, the Faroe Islands were able to secure points in almost half of the matches played, which makes him the most successful manager in the nation's history.

=== The Eyðun Klakstein years (2025–present) ===
In Eyðun Klakstein's first 2 matches as manager, the Faroes beat Armenia 1-0 and lost 1-0 to North Macedonia, securing their spot in the Nations League C for another season. Klakstein was named permanent manager on February 5, 2025, making him the first Faroese manager of the team since Jógvan Martin Olsen. Under Klakstein, the Faroe Islands had their best qualifying campaign for a major football tournament to date, finishing their 2026 World Cup qualifying group with 12 points from eight games and only missing out on a play-off berth due to a defeat on their final match to group leaders Croatia. The team would enjoy a strong 2026–27 UEFA Nations League C campaign, going undefeated with 1 win and 5 draws in a group with Moldova, Kazakhstan, and Slovakia. Their one win, a 1-0 home victory against Moldova, saw them finish on 8 points, good for second in the group; it also saw the Faroes go over a year without losing in competitive matches. They will play for promotion to League B in March.

== Stadiums ==
Between 1999 and 2011, the Faroe Islands rotated its home matches between two different stadiums, Tórsvøllur and Svangaskarð. Their latest match in Svangaskarð was a 2–0 victory in a UEFA Euro 2012 qualifying match against Estonia on 7 June 2011.

Tórsvøllur has since undergone comprehensive renovation, transforming it into a multifunctional venue for concerts and sports in general, although it is primarily used for football. Floodlights were introduced in 2011, and 6,000 new seats were installed, all under roof. The stadium has been resurfaced with artificial grass and now meets all UEFA and FIFA demands.

Work on Tórsvøllur was completed in 2021.

== Supporters ==
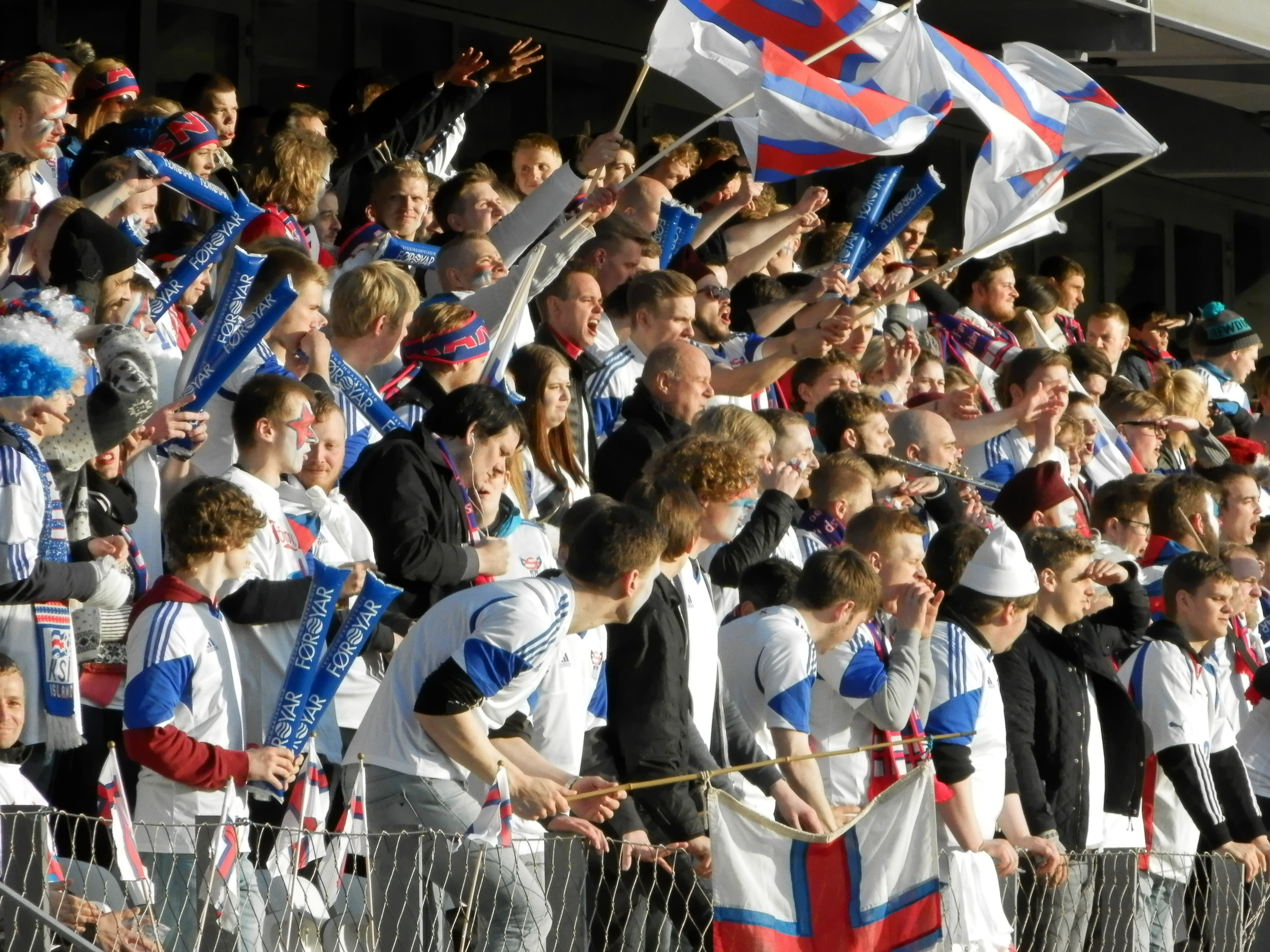
Skansin, Faroese football supporters at the Faroe Islands vs Greece match at Tórsvøllur 2015.

Faroe Islands have a main stand for their supporters at Tórsvøllur, which is known as "Skansin", meaning fort in English. Skansin was formed in 2014, following their 1–0 away victory against Greece in Pireaus and the opening of their newly renovated stadium.

As of September 2021, Skansin has 600 members domestically, and stand tickets are sold out every home match. Following Northern Ireland's 3–1 victory against Faroe Islands during the Euro 2016 qualifiers on 4 September 2015, Northern Ireland forward Kyle Lafferty stated that he was particularly impressed with the Faroese supporters, as they cheered for their players throughout the entire match, even when the Faroes threw away a likely 1–1 result.

Drums, trumpets and folksongs are an essential part of their support.

== Results and fixtures ==
The following is a list of match results in the last 12 months, as well as any future matches that have been scheduled.

Win Draw Loss Fixture

=== 2026 ===
26 March Friendly	Faroe Islands	Cancelled	Singapore	Dubai, United Arab Emirates
17:00 UTC+4				Stadium: Rashid Stadium
Note: Match cancelled due to the 2026 Iran war

28 March Friendly	San Marino	1–2	Faroe Islands	Serravalle, San Marino
15:00 UTC+1	N. Giacopetti 22'	Report	Andreasen 45+1'; Frederiksberg 65'	Stadium: San Marino Stadium; Attendance: 320; Referee: Kyriakos Athanasiou (Cyprus)

6 June 2026 Baltic Cup	Estonia	1–0	Faroe Islands	Pärnu, Estonia
18:00 UTC+3	Varjund 66'	Report		Stadium: Pärnu Rannastaadion; Attendance: 1,543; Referee: Kristaps Ratnieks (Latvia)

9 June 2026 Baltic Cup	Latvia	0–1	Faroe Islands	Riga, Latvia
18:00 UTC+3		Report	Sørensen 81'	Stadium: LNK Sporta Parks; Attendance: 729; Referee: Dovydas Švėgžda (Lithuania)

26 September 2026–27 Nations League	Faroe Islands	1–1	Kazakhstan	Tórshavn, Faroe Islands
17:00 UTC+1	Samuelsen 14'	Report	Yerlanov 26'	Stadium: Tórsvøllur; Attendance: 2,458; Referee: Ishmael Barbara (Malta)

29 September 2026–27 Nations League	Moldova	1–1	Faroe Islands	Chișinău, Moldova
21:45 UTC+3	Perciun 66'	Report	Davidsen 27' (pen.)	Stadium: Stadionul Zimbru; Attendance: 4,542; Referee: Julian Weinberger (Austria)

2 October 2026–27 Nations League	Faroe Islands	1–1	Slovakia	Tórshavn, Faroe Islands
19:45 UTC+1	Justinussen 66'	Report	Vatnhamar (o.g.)	Stadium: Tórsvøllur; Attendance: 2,853; Referee: Mohammed Al-Hakim (Sweden)

6 October 2026–27 Nations League	Kazakhstan	2–2	Faroe Islands	Astana, Kazakhstan
19:00 UTC+5	Malyi 68'; Alip 76'	Report	Knudsen 22'; Turi 63'	Stadium: Astana Arena; Attendance: 10,315; Referee: Kristo Tohver (Estonia)

13 November 2026–27 Nations League	Slovakia	2–2	Faroe Islands	Košice, Slovakia
20:45 UTC+1	Prekop 17'; Haraslín 74'	Report	Davidsen 30'; Samuelsen 47' (pen.)	Stadium: Košická futbalová aréna Attendance: 11,013; Referee: Mohammad Al-Emara (Finland)

16 November 2026–27 Nations League	Faroe Islands	1–0	Moldova	Tórshavn, Faroe Islands
15:00 UTC+0	Samuelsen 24'	Report		Stadium: Tórsvøllur; Attendance: 4,167; Referee: Enea Jorgji (Albania)

== Coaching staff ==
As of 17 November 2024

Position	Name
Head coach	(Faroe Islands) Eyðun Klakstein
Assistant coach	(Faroe Islands) Atli Gregersen
Goalkeeping coach	(Faroe Islands) Hjørtur Askham
Team Doctor Team Doctor Coordinator	(Faroe Islands) Elmar Ósá
Team Doctor	(Faroe Islands) Ólavur Johannesen
Fitness Coach Physio Physio Coordinator	(Faroe Islands) Álvur Hansen
Physio	(Faroe Islands) Øssur Steinhólm
Kit Manager	(Faroe Islands) Bárður Lava Olsen

=== Coaching history ===
As of 12 October 2025 after the game against Czech Republic.

- Friendly matches included.

Name	From	To	P	W	D	L	GS	GA	%W	Honours	Notes
(Iceland) Páll Guðlaugsson	1988	1993	25	2	3	20	9	76	8.00		
(Faroe Islands) Johan Nielsen (Faroe Islands) Jógvan Norðbúð (C)	1993	1993	1	0	0	1	0	4	0.00		
(Denmark) Allan Simonsen	1994	2001	52	8	7	37	37	119	15.38		
(Denmark) Henrik Larsen	2002	2005	26	5	2	19	24	62	19.23		
(Faroe Islands) Jógvan Martin Olsen	2006	2008	20	0	1	19	8	64	0.00		
(Faroe Islands) Heðin Askham (C)	2009	2009	1	1	0	0	2	1	100.00		
(Republic of Ireland) Brian Kerr	6 April 2009	26 October 2011	19	2	3	14	10	46	10.53		
(Denmark) Lars Olsen	November 2011	November 2019	56	9	7	40	37	114	16.07		
(Sweden) Håkan Ericson	16 December 2019	16 October 2024	48	9	13	26	42	80	18.75		
(Faroe Islands) Eyðun Klakstein	16 October 2024	Present	10	5	0	5	11	8	50.00		

== Players ==
=== Current squad ===
The following players were called up for the 2026–27 UEFA Nations League C games against Moldova on November 16 and Slovakia on November 13.

Caps and goals correct as of 16 November 2026, after the match against Moldova.

No.	Pos.	Player	Date of birth (age)	Caps	Goals	Club
1	GK	Mattias Lamhauge	2 August 1999 (age 27)	22	0	(Norwegian Football Federation) Strømsgodset
12	GK	Ari Petersen	7 December 2002 (age 23)	0	0	(Football Association of Iceland) ÍBV
23	GK	Bárður á Reynatrøð	8 January 2000 (age 26)	16	0	(Faroe Islands Football Association) Víkingur Gøta
2	DF	Jóannes Danielsen	10 September 1997 (age 29)	30	0	(Faroe Islands Football Association) KÍ
3	DF	Viljormur Davidsen (captain)	19 July 1991 (age 35)	98	8	(Faroe Islands Football Association) NSÍ Runavík
4	DF	Samuel Chukwudi	25 June 2003 (age 23)	11	0	(Austrian Football Association) SV Ried
5	DF	Andrias Edmundsson	18 December 2000 (age 25)	27	0	(Italian Football Federation) Hellas Verona
6	DF	Arnbjørn Svensson	1 July 1999 (age 27)	4	1	(Faroe Islands Football Association) Víkingur Gøta
8	DF	Ási Dam	9 September 1998 (age 28)	1	0	(Danish Football Association) Vendsyssel FF
10	MF	Meinhard Olsen	10 April 1997 (age 29)	44	1	(Faroe Islands Football Association) NSÍ
13	MF	Mattias Hellisdal	21 January 2006 (age 20)	3	0	(Swedish Football Association) Västerås SK
15	DF	Odmar Færø (vice-captain)	1 November 1989 (age 37)	76	2	(Faroe Islands Football Association) KÍ
16	DF	Gunnar Vatnhamar	29 March 1995 (age 31)	64	3	(Danish Football Association) Vejle Boldklub
19	DF	Jann Benjaminsen	3 April 1997 (age 29)	16	1	(Faroe Islands Football Association) NSÍ
	DF	Martin Agnarsson	7 December 2003 (age 22)	16	2	(Swedish Football Association) Mjällby AIF
20	MF	Hanus Sørensen	19 February 2001 (age 25)	34	5	(Football Association of Slovenia) NK Aluminij
21	MF	Géza Dávid Turi	6 October 2001 (age 25)	15	2	(The Football Association) Grimsby Town
22	MF	Jákup Andreasen	31 May 1998 (age 28)	37	3	(Faroe Islands Football Association) KÍ
7	FW	Jóannes Bjartalíð	10 July 1996 (age 30)	48	3	(Kazakhstan Football Federation) Kyzylzhar
9	FW	Áki Samuelsen	17 April 2004 (age 22)	8	3	(Swedish Football Association) Mjällby AIF
11	FW	Petur Knudsen	21 April 1998 (age 28)	35	3	(Faroe Islands Football Association) NSÍ
14	FW	Poul Kallsberg	4 February 2003 (age 23)	6	0	(Danish Football Association) Hillerød
17	FW	Adrian Justinussen	21 July 1998 (age 28)	26	2	(Danish Football Association) Horsens
18	FW	Aron Benjaminsen	2 November 2007 (age 19)	2	0	(Scottish Football Association) Heart of Midlothian

=== Recent call-ups ===
The following players have been called up within the last 12 months.

Pos.	Player	Date of birth (age)	Caps	Goals	Club	Latest call-up
GK	Silas Eyðsteinsson	13 February 1998 (age 28)	0	0	(Faroe Islands) B36 Tórshavn	2026 Baltic Cup
GK	Bjarti Mørk	7 June 2001 (age 25)	0	0	(Faroe Islands) HB	v. San Marino, 28 March 2026
DF	Heini Vatnsdal	18 October 1991 (age 35)	39	1	(Faroe Islands) B36 Tórshavn	v. Kazakhstan, 6 October 2026
DF	Ási Dam	18 December 2002 (age 23)	2	0	(Faroe Islands) HB	v. Kazakhstan, 6 October 2026
DF	Gullbrandur Øregaard	18 July 2002 (age 24)	3	0	(Norway) Sandnes Ulf	2026 Baltic Cup
MF	Emil Joensen	19 November 2003 (age 23)	1	0	(Faroe Islands) NSÍ	v. Kazakhstan, 6 October 2026
MF	Brandur Hendriksson	19 December 1995 (age 30)	72	6	(Faroe Islands) NSÍ	2026 Baltic Cup
MF	Noah Mneney	6 December 2002 (age 23)	12	0	(Faroe Islands) HB	2026 Baltic Cup
MF	Patrik Johannesen	19 December 1995 (age 30)	27	2	(Faroe Islands) KÍ	v. San Marino, 28 March 2026
FW	Páll Klettskarð	17 May 1990 (age 36)	24	0	(Faroe Islands) KÍ	v. Kazakhstan, 6 October 2026
FW	Jørgen Nielsen	30 November 2003 (age 22)	1	0	(Faroe Islands) Víkingur Gøta	v. Kazakhstan, 6 October 2026
FW	Árni Frederiksberg	12 June 1992 (age 34)	24	4	(Faroe Islands) KÍ	2026 Baltic Cup ^{RET}
Notes: ^{INJ} = Not part of the current squad due to injury.; ^{PRE} = Preliminary squad/standby.; ^{RET} = Retired from the national team.; ^{WD} = Player withdrew from the current squad due to non-injury issue.

== Records ==
As of 16 November 2026
Players in bold are still active with Faroe Islands.

=== Most appearances ===
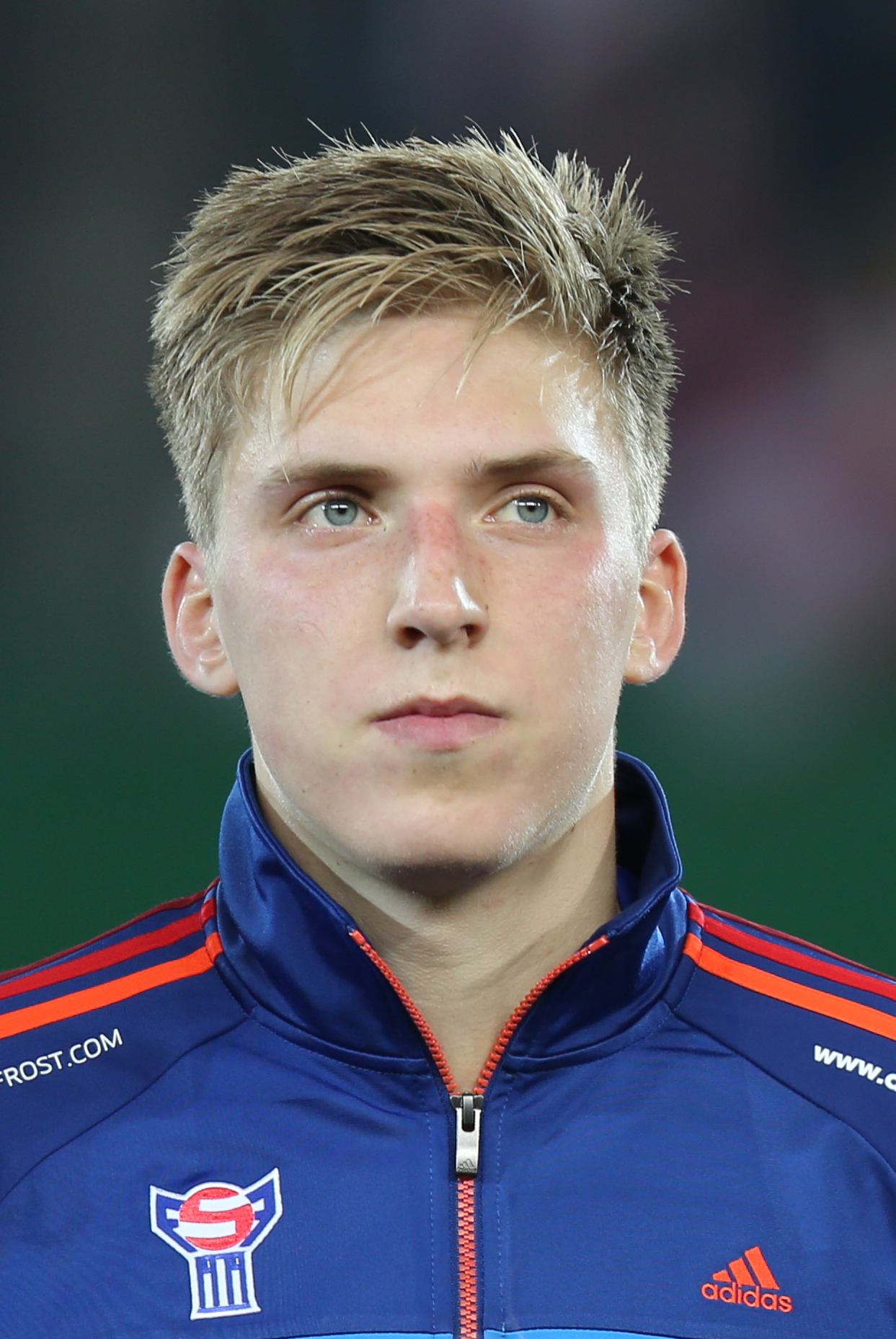
Jóan Símun Edmundsson is Faroe Islands' most capped player with 100 appearances.

Rank	Player	Caps	Goals	Career
1	**Jóan Símun Edmundsson**	99	8	2009–present
2	**Viljormur Davidsen**	98	8	2013–present
3	Fróði Benjaminsen	95	6	1999–2017
4	Óli Johannesen	83	1	1992–2007
5	Sølvi Vatnhamar	79	2	2013–2024
6	**Odmar Færø**	76	2	2012–present
6	Hallur Hansson	76	5	2012–2025
6	Jákup Mikkelsen	76	0	1995–2012
9	**Brandur Hendriksson**	72	6	2014–present
10	Gunnar Nielsen	70	0	2009–2022

=== Top goalscorers ===
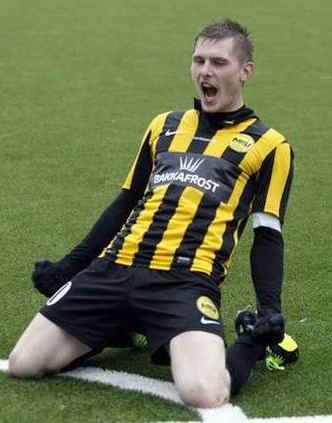
Klæmint Olsen is Faroe Islands' joint top scorer with 10 goals.

Rank	Player	Goals	Caps	Ratio	Career
1	Rógvi Jacobsen	10	53	0.19	1999–2009
1	Klæmint Olsen	10	64	0.16	2012–2024
3	Todi Jónsson	9	45	0.2	1991–2005
4	Uni Arge	8	37	0.22	1992–2002
4	**Viljormur Davidsen**	8	98	0.08	2013–present
4	**Jóan Símun Edmundsson**	8	99	0.08	2009–present
7	John Petersen	6	57	0.11	1995–2004
7	**Brandur Hendriksson**	6	71	0.08	2014–present
7	Fróði Benjaminsen	6	95	0.06	1999–2017
10	**Hanus Sørensen**	5	33	0.15	2022–present
10	Hallur Hansson	5	76	0.07	2012–present

== Competitive record ==
=== FIFA World Cup ===
FIFA World Cup record									Qualification record					
Year	Round	Position	Pld	W	D	L	GF	GA	Pld	W	D	L	GF	GA
(Uruguay) 1930 to (Mexico) 1986	Not a FIFA member								Not a FIFA member					
(Italy) 1990	Did not enter								Did not enter					
(United States) 1994	Did not qualify								10	0	0	10	1	38
(France) 1998	Did not qualify								10	2	0	8	10	31
(South Korea) (Japan) 2002	Did not qualify								10	2	1	7	6	23
(Germany) 2006	Did not qualify								10	0	1	9	4	27
(South Africa) 2010	Did not qualify								10	1	1	8	5	20
(Brazil) 2014	Did not qualify								10	0	1	9	4	29
(Russia) 2018	Did not qualify								10	2	3	5	4	16
(Qatar) 2022	Did not qualify								10	1	1	8	7	23
(Canada) (Mexico) (United States) 2026	Did not qualify								8	4	0	4	11	9
(Morocco) (Portugal) (Spain) 2030	To be determined													
(Saudi Arabia) 2034	To be determined													
Total		0/9							88	12	8	68	52	216

=== UEFA European Championship ===
UEFA European Championship record									Qualification record					
Year	Round	Position	Pld	W	D*	L	GF	GA	Pld	W	D	L	GF	GA
(France) 1960 to (West Germany) 1988	Did not enter								Declined participation					
(Sweden) 1992	Did not qualify								8	1	1	6	3	26
(England) 1996	Did not qualify								10	2	0	8	10	35
(Belgium) (Netherlands) 2000	Did not qualify								10	0	3	7	4	17
(Portugal) 2004	Did not qualify								8	0	1	7	7	18
(Austria) (Switzerland) 2008	Did not qualify								12	0	0	12	4	43
(Poland) (Ukraine) 2012	Did not qualify								10	1	1	8	6	26
(France) 2016	Did not qualify								10	2	0	8	6	17
(European Union) 2020	Did not qualify								10	1	0	9	4	30
(Germany) 2024	Did not qualify								8	0	2	6	2	13
(England) (Scotland) (Republic of Ireland) (Wales) 2028	To be determined								To be determined					
(Italy) (Turkey) 2032	To be determined								To be determined					
Total		0/17							86	7	8	71	46	225

=== UEFA Nations League ===
UEFA Nations League record
Season	Division	Group	Pld	W	D	L	GF	GA	P/R	RK
2018–19	D	3	6	1	2	3	5	10	Same position	50th
2020–21	D	1	6	3	3	0	9	5	▲	50th
2022–23	C	1	6	2	2	2	7	10	Same position	41st
2024–25	C	4	6	1	3	2	5	6	Same position	42nd
2026–27	C	3	6	1	5	0	8	7	TBD	39th
2026–27	C	Promotion play-off	0	0	0	0	0	0	TBD	39th
Total			30	8	15	7	34	38	41st	

=== Island Games ===
Island Games record
Year	Result	Pld	W	D	L	GF	GA
(Faroe Islands) 1989	Champions	4	4	0	0	20	1
(Åland) 1991	Champions	4	4	0	0	13	5
(Isle of Wight) 1993 to present	Did not enter						
Total		8	8	0	0	33	6

== Notable matches ==
As of match played 6 October 2026

14 April 1989	Faroe Islands	1–0	Canada	Gundadalur, Tórshavn (H)
		<	Nielsen	Attendance: 3,200

12 September 1990	Faroe Islands	1–0	Austria	Idrottsparken, Landskrona (N)
	Nielsen			Attendance: 1,265

1 May 1991	Northern Ireland	1–1	Faroe Islands	Windsor Park, Belfast (A)
			Reynheim	Attendance: 10,000

25 May 1995	Faroe Islands	3–0	San Marino	Svangaskarð, Toftir (H)
	J. Hansen; Rasmussen; Johnsson			Attendance: 3,450

11 October 1995	San Marino	1–3	Faroe Islands	Stadio Olimpico, Serravalle (A)
			T. Jónsson (3)	Attendance: 928

30 April 1997	Malta	1–2	Faroe Islands	Ta' Qali National Stadium, Ta' Qali (A)
			Ø. Hansen; T. Jónsson	Attendance: 2,750

8 June 1997	Faroe Islands	2–1	Malta	Svangaskarð, Toftir (H)
	T. Jónsson (2)			Attendance: 6,400

10 October 1998	Lithuania	0–0	Faroe Islands	Žalgiris Stadium, Vilnius (A)
				Attendance: 1,500

5 June 1999	Faroe Islands	1–1	Scotland	Svangaskarð, Toftir (H)
	H. Hansen			Attendance: 4,100

9 June 1999	Faroe Islands	2–2	Bosnia and Herzegovina	Svangaskarð, Toftir (H)
	Arge (2)			Attendance: 4,800

3 September 2000	Faroe Islands	2–2	Slovenia	Svangaskarð, Toftir (H)
	Arge; Ø. Hansen			Attendance: 3,200

31 January 2001	Sweden	0–0	Faroe Islands	Tipshallen, Växjö (A)
				Attendance: 2,204

24 March 2001	Luxembourg	0–2	Faroe Islands	Stade Josy Barthel, Luxembourg City (A)
			C. Jacobsen; K. Mørkøre	Attendance: 2,500

1 September 2001	Faroe Islands	1–0	Luxembourg	Svangaskarð, Toftir (H)
	J. Hansen			Attendance: 1,464

7 September 2002	Faroe Islands	2–2	Scotland	Svangaskarð, Toftir (H)
	J. Petersen (2)			Attendance: 4,000

27 April 2003	Faroe Islands	2–1	Kazakhstan	Svangaskarð, Toftir (H)
			Borg; Petersen; Heðin á Lakjuni1Heðin á Lakjuni	Attendance: 420

29 April 2003	Faroe Islands	2–1	Kazakhstan	Tórsvøllur, Tórshavn (H)
			Fløtum, Johnsson	Attendance: 800

9 October 2004	Cyprus	2–2	Faroe Islands	GSP Stadium, Nicosia (A)
			Jørgensen; R. Jacobsen	Attendance: 1,400

11 October 2008	Faroe Islands	1–1	Austria	Tórsvøllur, Tórshavn (H)
	Løkin			Attendance: 1,890

29 April 2003	Iceland	1–2	Faroe Islands	Kórinn fjölnota knatthús, Kópavogur (A)
			Benjaminsen, Antoníusson	Attendance: 553

9 September 2009	Faroe Islands	2–1	Lithuania	Svangaskarð, Toftir (H)
	S. Olsen; A. Hansen			Attendance: 1,942

12 October 2010	Faroe Islands	1–1	Northern Ireland	Svangaskarð, Toftir (H)
	Holst			Attendance: 1,921

7 June 2011	Faroe Islands	2–0	Estonia	Svangaskarð, Toftir (H)
	Benjaminsen; A. Hansen			Attendance: 1,715

14 November 2014	Greece	0–1	Faroe Islands	Karaiskakis Stadium, Piraeus (A)
			Edmundsson	Attendance: 16,821

13 June 2015	Faroe Islands	2–1	Greece	Tórsvøllur, Tórshavn (H)
	Hansson; Hendriksson			Attendance: 5,000

6 September 2016	Faroe Islands	0–0	Hungary	Tórsvøllur, Tórshavn (H)
				Attendance: 4,066

7 October 2016	Latvia	0–2	Faroe Islands	Skonto Stadium, Riga (A)
			Nattestad; Edmundsson	Attendance: 4,823

25 March 2017	Andorra	0–0	Faroe Islands	Estadi Nacional, Andorra la Vella (A)
				Attendance: 1,000

3 September 2017	Faroe Islands	1–0	Andorra	Tórsvøllur, Tórshavn (H)
	Rólantsson			Attendance: 4,357

8 October 2017	Faroe Islands	0–0	Latvia	Tórsvøllur, Tórshavn (H)
				Attendance: 4,206

7 September 2018	Faroe Islands	3–1	Malta	Tórsvøllur, Tórshavn (H)
	Edmundsson, R. Joensen, Nattestad

14 October 2018	Faroe Islands	1–1	Kosovo	Tórsvøllur, Tórshavn (H)
	R. Joensen

20 November 2018	Faroe Islands	1–1	Malta	Tórsvøllur, Tórshavn (H)
	R. Joensen

15 October 2019	Faroe Islands	1–0	Malta	Tórsvøllur, Tórshavn (H)
	Baldvinsson

3 September 2020	Faroe Islands	3–2	Malta	Tórsvøllur, Tórshavn (H)
	K. Olsen, A. Olsen, Hendriksson			Attendance: 0

6 September 2020	Andorra	0–1	Faroe Islands	Estadi Nacional, Andorra la Vella (A)
			K. Olsen	Attendance: 0

10 October 2020	Faroe Islands	1–1	Latvia	Tórsvøllur, Tórshavn (H)
	Færø			Attendance: 447

13 October 2020	Faroe Islands	2–0	Andorra	Tórsvøllur, Tórshavn (H)
	K.Olsen (2)			Attendance: 500

14 November 2020	Latvia	1–1	Faroe Islands	Skonto Stadium, Riga (A)
		Report	G. Vatnhamar	Attendance: 500

17 November 2020	Malta	1–1	Faroe Islands	Ta' Qali National Stadium, Ta' Qali (A)
			Á. Jónsson	Attendance: 0

25 March 2021	Moldova	1–1	Faroe Islands	Stadionul Zimbru, Chișinău (A)
		Report	M. Olsen 83'

7 September 2021	Faroe Islands	2–1	Moldova	Tórsvøllur, Tórshavn (H)
	K. Olsen 68'; Vatnsdal 72'	Report

11 June 2022	Faroe Islands	2–1	Lithuania	Tórsvøllur, Tórshavn (H)
	Davidsen 20'; Andreasen 45'	Report

14 June 2022	Luxembourg	2–2	Faroe Islands	Stade de Luxembourg, Luxembourg (A)
		Report	Bjartalíð 57', 59'

22 September 2022	Lithuania	1–1	Faroe Islands	LFF Stadium, Vilnius (A)
		Report	Andreasen 22'

25 September 2022	Faroe Islands	2–1	Turkey	Tórsvøllur, Tórshavn (H)
	Davidsen 51'; Edmundsson 59'	Report		Attendance: 2500

7 September 2024	Faroe Islands	1–1	North Macedonia	Tórsvøllur, Tórshavn (H)
	Davidsen 9'	Report		Attendance: 2057

10 October 2024	Faroe Islands	2–2	Armenia	Tórsvøllur, Tórshavn (H)
	Jann Benjaminsen 37'; Jóannes Bjartalíð 85'	Report		Attendance: 1852

13 October 2024	Faroe Islands	1–1	Latvia	Tórsvøllur, Tórshavn (H)
	Hanus Sørensen 40'	Report		Attendance: 2017

14 November 2024	Armenia	0–1	Faroe Islands	Vazgen Sargsyan Republican Stadium, Yerevan (A)
	Viljormur Davidsen 33' (pen.)	Report		Attendance: 6043

9 October 2025	Faroe Islands	4–0	Montenegro	Tórshavn (H)
	Sørensen 16', 55'; Roganović 36' (o.g.); Frederiksberg 72' (pen.)	Report		Stadium: Tórsvøllur; Attendance: 2,034; Referee: Javier Alberola Rojas (Spain)

12 October 2025	Faroe Islands	2–1	Czech Republic	Tórshavn (H)
	Sørensen 67'; Agnarsson 81'	Report		Stadium: Tórsvøllur; Attendance: 2,908; Referee: Andrea Colombo (Italy)

== FIFA ranking history ==
1993	1994	1995	1996	1997	1998	1999	2000	2001	2002	2003	2004	2005	2006	2007	2008	2009	2010	2011	2012	2013	2014	2015	2016	2017	2018	2019	2020	2021	2022	2023	2024
115	133	120	135	117	125	112	117	117	114	126	131	132	181	194	184	117	136	116	153	170	104	97	83	95	94	110	107	123	122	135	137

== All-time record ==
As of match played 6 October 2026

All-time record of the Faroe Islands national football team
Opponents	Pld	W	D	L	GF	GA	Win%
Albania	2	0	1	1	1	3	0.00
Andorra	5	3	2	0	4	0	60.00
Armenia	2	1	1	0	3	2	50.00
Austria	8	1	1	6	4	21	12.50
Azerbaijan	3	0	0	3	0	8	0.00
Belgium	2	0	0	2	0	6	0.00
Bosnia and Herzegovina	2	0	1	1	2	3	0.00
Canada	2	1	0	1	1	1	50.00
Croatia	2	0	0	2	1	4	0.00
Cyprus	4	0	1	3	3	10	0.00
Czech Republic	9	1	0	8	3	19	11.11
Czechoslovakia	2	0	0	2	0	7	0.00
Denmark	7	0	0	7	2	20	0.00
Estonia	9	2	1	6	11	20	22.22
Finland	5	0	0	5	1	14	0.00
France	6	0	0	6	0	22	0.00
Georgia	3	0	0	3	1	10	0.00
Germany	4	0	0	4	1	10	0.00
Gibraltar	4	3	1	0	7	2	75.00
Greece	4	2	0	2	4	11	50.00
Hungary	4	0	1	3	1	4	0.00
Iceland	14	1	0	13	8	25	7.14
Israel	5	0	1	4	4	12	0.00
Italy	4	0	0	4	2	11	0.00
Kazakhstan	7	3	3	1	11	9	42.86
Kosovo	4	0	2	2	2	6	0.00
Latvia	9	2	5	2	6	5	22.22
Liechtenstein	8	8	0	0	21	4	100.00
Lithuania	11	2	2	7	8	15	18.18
Luxembourg	6	3	2	1	9	5	50.00
Malta	10	6	2	2	19	14	60.00
Moldova	5	1	3	1	5	5	20.00
Montenegro	2	1	0	1	4	1	50.00
Netherlands	1	0	0	1	0	3	0.00
Northern Ireland	6	0	2	4	3	16	0.00
North Macedonia	3	0	1	2	1	3	0.00
Norway	5	0	0	5	0	17	0.00
Poland	5	0	0	5	1	16	0.00
Portugal	3	0	0	3	1	16	0.00
Republic of Ireland	4	0	0	4	1	11	0.00
Romania	8	0	0	8	2	26	0.00
Russia	4	0	0	4	2	12	0.00
San Marino	3	3	0	0	8	2	100.00
Scotland	11	0	2	9	6	31	0.00
Serbia	4	0	0	4	1	10	0.00
Slovakia	3	0	1	2	2	6	0.00
Slovenia	4	0	1	3	3	12	0.00
Spain	4	0	0	4	4	17	0.00
Sweden	5	0	1	4	1	13	0.00
Switzerland	6	0	0	6	2	19	0.00
Turkey	3	1	1	1	3	6	33.33
Ukraine	2	0	0	2	0	7	0.00
Wales	2	0	0	2	0	9	0.00
Yugoslavia	6	0	0	6	2	28	0.00
Total	266	45	39	182	192	589	16.92

== Honours ==
=== Friendly ===
- Island Games
  - Gold medal (2): 1989, 1991
- Greenland Cup
  - Champions (2): 1983, 1984
  - Runners-up (1): 1980

== See also ==
- Faroe Islands national under-21 football team
- Faroe Islands women's national football team
