= List of sport associations in the Faroe Islands =

This is a list of the various sport associations in the Faroe Islands.

== Chess ==
Members of The Faroese Chess Federation Talvsamband Føroyar (TSF) include:

- Eiðis Talvfelag (ET), Eiði
- Gøtu Talvfelag (GT), Gøta
- Havnar Talvfelag (HT), Tórshavn
- Kollafjarðar Talvfelag (KT), Kollafjørður
- Klaksvíkar Talvfelag (KTF), Klaksvík
- Miðvágs Talvfelag (MT), Miðvágur
- Talvfelagið Rókur (Rókur), Norðskáli
- Sandavágs Talvfelag (ST), Sandavágur
- Sumbiar Talvfelag (SBT), Sumba
- Talvfelagið Streymur (TFS), Hvalvík
- Tofta Talvfelag (TT), Toftir
- Vestmanna Talvfelag (VT), Vestmanna

== Football ==
Football clubs in the Faroe Islands:

- AB
- B36
- B68
- B71
- EB/Streymur
- FC Hoyvík
- 07 Vestur
- GÍ
- HB
- ÍF
- KÍ
- LÍF
- MB
- NSÍ
- Royn
- Skála
- SÍ
- SÍF
- FC Suðuroy
- TB
- Víkingur Gøta

== Handball ==
Handball clubs in the Faroe Islands

- H71
- KÍF
- Kyndil
- Neistin
- STÍF
- Stjørnan
- Søljan
- VB
- VÍF

== Rowing ==
Rowing clubs in the Faroe Islands:

- Argja Róðrarfelag
- Havnar Róðrarfelag
- Miðvágs Róðrarfelag
- Róðrarfelagið Knørrur
- Vágs Kappróðrarfelag
- Froðbiar Sóknar Róðrarfelag
- Sørvágs Róðrarfelag
- Hvalvíkar-Streymnesar Róðrarfelag
- Klaksvíkar Róðrarfelag
- Norðdepils-Hvannasunds Róðrarfelag
- Vestmanna Ítróttarfelag
- Kappróðrarfelagið NSÍ

== Volleyball ==
Volleyball clubs in the Faroe Islands:

- Dráttur
- Fossanes
- ÍF
- KÍF
- Fram Tórshavn
- Fleyr Tórshavn
- Mjølnir Klaksvík
- SÍ
- TB Tvøroyri

== Swimming ==
Swimming clubs in the Faroe Islands:

- Susvim
- Havnar Svimjifelag
- Ægir
- Fuglafjarðar Svimjifelag
- Svimjifelagið FLOT
