= 1992 1. deild =

Coordinates: 62.0167°N 6.7667°W

Faroe Islands Premier League Football
- Season: 1992
- Champions: HB
- Relegated: NSÍ
- Matches played: 90
- Goals scored: 278 (3.09 per match)
- Top goalscorer: Símun Petur Justinussen (14 goals)
- Biggest home win: KÍ 6–0 GÍ
- Biggest away win: B36 0–3 KÍ; B68 1–4 GÍ Gøta; HB 0–3 B71; NSÍ 0–3 HB; SÍF 1–4 TB; TB 0–3 B68; TB 0–3 GÍ
- Highest scoring: HB 6–3 SÍF

Statistics of 1. deild in the 1992 season.

== Overview ==
It was contested by 10 teams, and B68 Toftir won the championship.

== League standings ==
Pos	Team	Pld	W	D	L	GF	GA	GD	Pts	Qualification or relegation
1	B68 Toftir	18	11	5	2	35	18	+17	27	Qualification for the Champions League Preliminary round
2	GÍ Gøta	18	11	3	4	33	20	+13	25	
3	KÍ Klaksvík	18	7	9	2	32	18	+14	23	
4	Havnar Bóltfelag	18	7	7	4	34	24	+10	21	Qualification for the Cup Winners' Cup qualifying round
5	TB Tvøroyri	18	7	5	6	29	30	−1	19	
6	B36 Tórshavn	18	4	8	6	26	28	−2	16	
7	VB Vágur	18	4	8	6	19	26	−7	16	
8	B71 Sandur	18	4	7	7	24	25	−1	15	
9	SÍF Sandavágur	18	4	4	10	29	40	−11	12	
10	NSÍ Runavík	18	2	2	14	17	49	−32	6	

== Results ==
The schedule consisted of a total of 18 games. Each team played two games against every opponent in no particular order. One of the games was at home and one was away.

Home \ Away	B36	B68	B71	GÍG	HB	KÍ	NSÍ	SÍF	TB	VBV
B36 Tórshavn		0–0	2–2	1–1	2–2	0–3	5–1	2–4	1–2	3–0
B68 Toftir	0–0		1–0	1–4	1–0	0–0	4–2	4–1	5–0	2–1
B71 Sandoy	1–0	2–4		1–2	0–0	1–2	3–0	1–1	1–0	2–2
GÍ Gøta	0–1	1–1	1–0		1–2	1–0	4–0	3–1	5–2	1–2
HB	2–1	4–2	0–3	1–1		2–2	3–4	6–3	0–0	4–0
KÍ	2–2	1–1	1–1	6–0	1–0		2–0	3–1	1–1	3–3
NSÍ Runavík	1–3	2–4	2–2	0–1	0–3	1–0		0–0	1–2	0–1
SÍF Sandavágur	2–2	0–1	2–1	0–2	2–2	1–2	5–1		1–4	4–1
TB	5–1	0–3	4–2	0–3	0–2	2–2	5–1	2–1		0–0
VB Vágur	0–0	0–1	1–1	1–2	1–1	1–1	2–1	3–0	0–0	

Source: www.faroesoccer.com
Legend: Blue = home team win; Yellow = draw; Red = away team win.

== Top goalscorers ==
Source: faroesoccer.com

14 goals

- (Faroe Islands) Símun Petur Justinussen (GÍ)

11 goals

- (Faroe Islands) Uni Arge (HB)

10 goals

- (Faroe Islands) Øssur Hansen (B68)
- (Faroe Islands) Olgar Danielsen (KÍ)

8 goals

- (Faroe Islands) Jákup Símun Simonsen (B36)
- (Faroe Islands) Aksel Højgaard (B68)
- (Faroe Islands) Bogi Johannesen (TB)

7 goals

- (Faroe Islands) Jens Kristian Hansen (B36)
- (Faroe Islands) Gunnar Mohr (HB)
