= Géza Turi =

Hungarian footballer (born 1974)

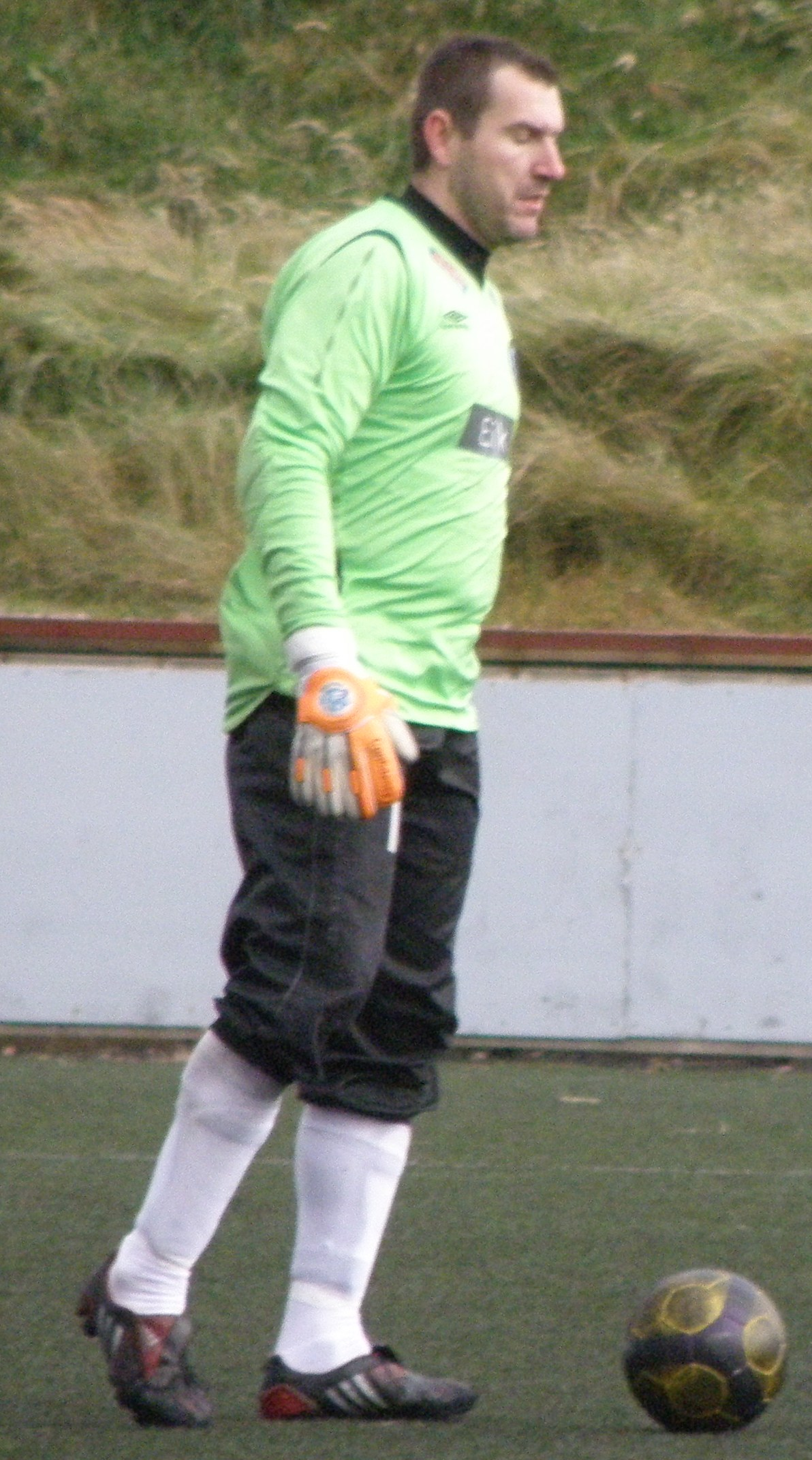

Personal information
- Full name: Géza Tamás Turi
- Date of birth: 11 March 1974 (age 52)
- Place of birth: Budapest, Hungary
- Height: 1.88 m (6 ft 2 in)
- Position: Goalkeeper

Senior career*
Years	Team	Apps	(Gls)
- Keszthelyi Haladás SC
	Csepel SC	2	(0)
- Dunakeszi VSE
2000–2003	Zalaegerszegi TE	78	(0)
2003–2004	FC Fehérvár	9	(0)
2005–2006	FC Tatabánya	14	(0)
2006–2007	GÍ Gøta	55	(0)
2008–2018	Víkingur Gøta	235	(0)
2019–2020	KÍ Klaksvík	1	(0)
- * Club domestic league appearances and goals as of 1 October 2019

Géza Turi (born 11 March 1974, in Budapest) is a Hungarian former football player who is currently a goalkeeper coach for KÍ Klaksvík.

== Career ==
Whilst at Hungarian side ZTE, Turi played against Manchester United at Old Trafford in a UEFA Champions League qualifier. He came on as a substitute after Saša Ilić was sent off for a foul on Ruud van Nistelrooy. He came to the Faroe Islands to be a goalkeeper for GÍ Gøta, which merged with LÍF Leirvík in 2009 into the new club Víkingur. Géza Turi has been the goalkeeper for Víkingur Gøta and the former GÍ Gøta since 2006.

In 2019, the 45-year-old Turi signed for KÍ Klaksvík, where he worked as a goalkeepers coach, but also as the club's third-choice goalkeeper. In the build-up for a Faroe Islands Premier League match against Havnar Bóltfelag on 14 May 2023, Klaksvík's full-time keepers were both ruled off, as Markus Pettersen fell ill, while his backup Rói Hentze got injured, thus forcing Turi to make his first league appearance since June 2018, when he was 44, but despite his advanced age, he managed to keep a clean-sheet in a 1–0 victory.

In doing so, at the age of 49 years 64 days, he became not only the oldest player in the history of the Faroe Islands top-flight, breaking the previous record set by the Pole goalkeeper Waldemar Nowicki in 2008 (aged 47 years and 235 days), but also the oldest active player in the top-flight national divisions of the world, surpassing Bulgarian goalkeeper Georgi Petkov, who had played the month before in the Bulgarian top-flight at the age of 47. He was thus the oldest top-tier player of 2023, ahead of Petkov.

== Personal life ==
He is the father of fellow footballer and Grimsby Town player Géza Dávid Turi.

== Honours ==
Zalaegerszegi TE

- Nemzeti Bajnokság: 2001–02

Kí Klaksvìk

- Faroe Islands Premier League: 2019

Víkingur Gøta

- Faroe Islands Premier League: 2016
- Faroe Islands Cup:2014, 2015, 2016
