= 1947 Meistaradeildin =

Faroese football league season

Meistaradeildin
- Season: 1947
- Champions: SÍ Sørvágur (1st title)
- Matches played: 12
- Goals scored: 42 (3.5 per match)

1947 Meistaradeildin was the fifth season of Meistaradeildin, the top tier of the Faroese football league system. It was the first time the competition was played in a league format. SÍ Sørvágur won its first and only championship.

== League table ==
Pos	Team	Pld	W	D	L	GF	GA	GD	Pts
1	SÍ Sørvágur (C)	6	4	1	1	9	6	+3	9
2	KÍ Klaksvík	6	4	0	2	8	7	+1	8
3	HB Tórshavn	6	4	0	2	7	6	+1	8
4	B36 Tórshavn	6	3	2	1	4	6	−2	8
5	VB Vágur	6	2	1	3	3	1	+2	5
6	SÍF Sandavágur	6	2	0	4	9	8	+1	4
7	MB Miðvágur	6	0	0	6	2	8	−6	0

Source: Faroe Soccer
(C) Champions

== Results ==
Home \ Away	B36	HB	KÍ	MB	SÍ	SÍF	VB
B36 Tórshavn		0–4	3–1			– (Note: SÍF lost by forfeit.)	
HB Tórshavn				– (Note: MB lost by forfeit.)		–	– (Note: VB lost by forfeit.)
KÍ Klaksvík		3–2		–	2–0		
MB Miðvágur	–				–		0–3
SÍ Sørvágur	1–1	3–1					–
SÍF Sandavágur			2–1	5–2	2–5		
VB Vágur	0–0		0–1			–	

Source: Faroe Soccer
Legend: Blue = home team win; Yellow = draw; Red = away team win.
