= 1990 1. deild =

Coordinates: 62.0167°N 6.7667°W

Faroe Islands Premier League Football
- Season: 1990
- Champions: HB
- Relegated: B71
- Matches played: 90
- Goals scored: 257 (2.86 per match)
- Biggest home win: GÍ 7–1 KÍ
- Biggest away win: KÍ 0–3 HB; TB 0–3 HB
- Highest scoring: KÍ 6–5 MB

Statistics of 1. deild in the 1990 season.

== Overview ==
It was contested by 10 teams, and Havnar Bóltfelag won the championship.

== League standings ==
Pos	Team	Pld	W	D	L	GF	GA	GD	Pts
1	Havnar Bóltfelag	18	9	6	3	37	22	+15	24
2	B36 Tórshavn	18	9	2	7	30	27	+3	20
3	MB Miðvágur	18	6	7	5	28	25	+3	19
4	GÍ Gøta	18	7	4	7	28	20	+8	18
5	VB Vágur	18	7	4	7	27	27	0	18
6	B68 Toftir	18	6	6	6	19	20	−1	18
7	KÍ Klaksvík	18	6	5	7	30	36	−6	17
8	TB Tvøroyri	18	7	2	9	21	26	−5	16
9	SÍF Sandavágur	18	7	2	9	20	29	−9	16
10	B71 Sandur	18	4	6	8	17	25	−8	14

== Results ==
The schedule consisted of a total of 14 games. Each team played two games against every opponent in no particular order. One of the games was at home and one was away.

Home \ Away	B36	B68	B71	GÍG	HB	KÍ	MBM	SÍF	TB	VBV
B36 Tórshavn		3–1	2–2	1–0	1–2	2–0	1–1	3–0	1–2	2–0
B68 Toftir	1–0		2–1	0–2	0–0	0–2	1–1	1–1	1–0	4–1
B71 Sandoy	2–3	1–0		0–2	2–1	2–2	0–2	0–1	1–0	1–2
GÍ Gøta	2–1	0–1	1–2		3–3	7–1	1–0	1–2	2–0	1–1
HB	1–2	1–1	2–0	2–1		2–2	3–0	3–1	1–1	4–2
KÍ	0–1	2–1	1–1	2–2	0–3		6–5	3–0	5–2	0–2
MB Miðvágur	4–0	2–2	1–1	0–0	2–2	1–1		0–1	1–2	2–1
SÍF Sandavágur	2–4	2–0	0–0	0–2	1–3	3–2	0–1		2–0	3–1
TB	3–2	0–2	2–0	2–1	0–3	2–0	1–2	3–0		1–2
VB Vágur	3–1	1–1	1–1	2–0	3–1	0–1	2–3	2–1	0–0	

Source: www.faroesoccer.com
Legend: Blue = home team win; Yellow = draw; Red = away team win.

== Top goalscorers ==
Rank	Player	Club	Goals
1	(Faroe Islands) Gunnar Mohr	HB	10
1	(Faroe Islands) Jens Erik Rasmussen	MB	10
3	(Faroe Islands) Per Dalheim	GÍ	9
4	(Faroe Islands) Uni Arge	HB	8
5	(Faroe Islands) Birgir Jørgensen	MB	7
6	(Faroe Islands) Jógvan Martin Olsen	B68	5 (2)
7	(Faroe Islands) Jón Pauli Olsen	VB	4 (5)
7	(Faroe Islands) Torkil Nielsen	SÍF	4 (3)
