= 1989 1. deild =

Top-level association football league in the Faroe Islands

Coordinates: 62.0167°N 6.7667°W

Faroe Islands Premier League Football
- Season: 1989
- Champions: B71
- Relegated: ÍF Fuglafjørður; LÍF
- Matches: 90
- Goals: 273 (3.03 per match)
- Top goalscorer: Egill Steinþórsson (VB Vágur)

In 1989, 1. deild was the top-tier league in Faroe Islands football (since 2005, the top tier has been the Faroe Islands Premier League, with 1. deild becoming the second tier).

== Overview ==
It was contested by 10 teams, with B71 Sandoy and SÍF Sandavágur promoted from the 1988 2. deild. B71 Sandoy won the championship in their first year after promotion. ÍF Fuglafjørður and Leirvík ÍF were relegated after the season.

== League standings ==
Pos	Team	Pld	W	D	L	GF	GA	GD	Pts
1	B71 Sandoy	18	13	5	0	37	13	+24	31
2	Havnar Bóltfelag	18	8	6	4	43	30	+13	22
3	B68 Toftir	18	7	8	3	25	20	+5	22
4	VB Vágur	18	8	5	5	33	21	+12	21
5	KÍ Klaksvík	18	8	5	5	36	32	+4	21
6	B36 Tórshavn	18	8	3	7	27	26	+1	19
7	GÍ Gøta	18	7	2	9	28	33	−5	16
8	SÍF Sandavágur	18	5	5	8	24	30	−6	15
9	ÍF Fuglafjørður	18	2	6	10	11	30	−19	10
10	Leirvík ÍF	18	0	3	15	9	38	−29	3

== Results ==
Home \ Away	B36	B68	B71	GÍG	HB	ÍF	KÍ	LÍF	SÍF	VBV
B36 Tórshavn		2–2	0–2	2–1	5–3	0–0	1–4	3–1	4–0	2–1
B68 Toftir	2–0		1–3	1–0	3–1	2–0	1–1	0–0	2–1	1–2
B71 Sandoy	0–0	1–1		3–2	6–2	1–0	2–1	2–0	4–1	0–0
GÍ Gøta	0–1	1–3	1–2		0–5	3–0	3–3	1–0	3–1	1–3
HB	1–0	2–2	0–0	2–2		4–0	2–2	4–1	1–0	0–4
ÍF	2–1	0–0	1–3	0–2	1–4		1–0	0–0	0–0	1–1
KÍ	0–1	2–2	0–3	5–2	1–7	2–0		4–1	1–0	2–0
Leirvík ÍF	0–2	0–2	0–1	1–3	0–2	1–1	1–2		1–3	0–3
SÍF Sandavágur	3–1	0–0	2–2	1–2	2–2	2–1	2–3	4–2		1–0
VB Vágur	4–2	4–0	1–2	0–1	1–1	4–3	3–3	1–0	1–1	

Legend: Blue = home team win; Yellow = draw; Red = away team win.

== Top goalscorers ==
Rank	Player	Club	Goals
1	(Iceland) Egill Steinþórsson	VB	15
2	(Faroe Islands) Karl Marius Poulsen	KÍ	11
3	(Faroe Islands) Torkil Nielsen	SÍF	10
4	(Faroe Islands) Gunnar Mohr	HB	9
5	(Faroe Islands) Bergur Magnussen	B36	8
5	(Faroe Islands) Rói Árting	HB	8
7	(Faroe Islands) Jonhard Joensen	SÍF	7
7	(Faroe Islands) Uni Arge	HB	7
