= FSF Trophy =

The FSF Trophy (FSF Steypið)
- Duration
- 2004–2005
- Continent
- Europe (UEFA)
- Stages
- Group-stages - Quarterfinals - Semi-finals - Final
- Most successful club
- (Faroe Islands) B71 Sandoy; Champions (1) - Runner-up (1)
- Website
- The Faroese Football Association's Website

The FSF Trophy, or FSF-Steypið (as it was called in Faroese), was a national football tournament, taking place on the Faroe Islands, and lasting only for 2 seasons. The main purpose of the tournament was to give the smaller teams a chance to win a trophy, since many of these were traditionally eliminated from the Faroe Islands Cup in the preliminary stages. Because of this, only teams from the 1. deild (2. division) and downwards were eligible to enter the tournament and play.

B71 Sandoy won the trophy in its first year in 2004, beating GÍ Gøta, and made it to the final again in 2005, but were subsequently beaten by B68 Toftir.

The tournament was dissolved before the start of the 2006 season.

== Finals ==
- 2004 : B71 Sandoy beat GÍ Gøta
- 2005 : B68 Toftir beat B71 Sandoy
