= SÍF Sandavágur =

Association football club in Faroe Islands

SÍF Sandavagur
- Full name: Sandavágs Ítróttafelag
- Founded: 1906
- Ground: Valloyran
- Capacity: 1,000
- Website: http://www.sif.fo/
Home colours	Away colours

SÍF Sandavágur is a Faroese Football club based in Sandavágur on the island of Vágar.

== History ==
SÍF Sandavágur was founded in 1906; although the club is one of oldest in the Faroe Islands, SÍF only played in the top division (now Betri Deildin) three times: 1989, 1990 and 1992, since the league's creation in 1942. The best league finish in the top flight was 8th Place in 1989.

In 1993, SÍF merged with MB Miðvágur to form FS Vágar. SÍ Sørvágur also became part of the merger in 1998. They played in the top league between 1995–97 and again in 2000.

After the 2004 season the merger collapsed and the 3 clubs separated. After the split, SIF Sandavágur joined 3. deild (the fourth league) in the 2007 season, this was the last season they played at adult level and the club hasn't participated in the Football League since. Because SÍF became part of the newly named club, 07 Vestur. But participates independently in the youth divisions under the original name.

== Honours ==
- 1. deild
  - Champions (4): 1960, 1969, 1970, 1973
- 2. deild
  - Champions (1): 1981
