= Sørvágs Ítróttarfelag =

Association football club in Faroe Islands

SÍ Sørvágur
- Full name: Sørvágs Ítróttarfelag
- Founded: 17 March 1905
- Ground: á Dungasandi, Sørvágur
- League: 1. deild
- 2007: 8th

Sørvágs Ítróttarfelag, commonly known as SÍ, is a sports association based in Sørvágur, Faroe Islands. It was founded on 17 March 1905.

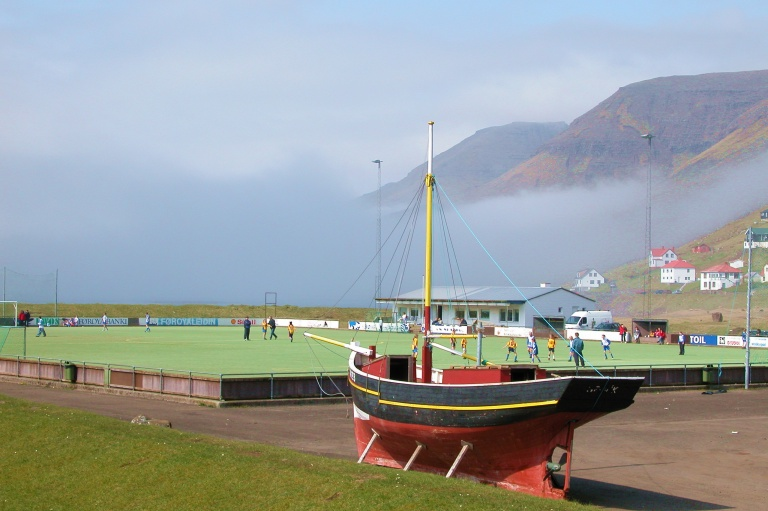
View of the football pitch in Sørvágur.

== Football ==
Founded in 1905, SÍ won its first and only title in the Faroese top division in 1947. In 1998, SÍ became part of FS Vágar; they left at the end of 2002, but merged again after the 2007 season to form 07 Vestur.

=== Honours ===
- Faroe Islands Premier League: 1
  - 1947
- 2. deild: 3
  - 1978, 1987, 2005
- 3. deild: 1
  - 2003

== Volleyball ==
SÍ is one of the most successful volleyball clubs in the Faroe Islands, having won the league six times, and the cup seven times with the men's team, and three and four times, respectively, with the women's team.

=== Honours ===
- Faroese Volleyball League: 6
  - 2005, 2008, 2010, 2012, 2016, 2017
- Faroese Volleyball Cup: 7
  - 2002, 2005, 2008, 2010, 2012, 2015, 2018
- Faroese Women's Volleyball League: 4
  - 2008, 2009, 2010, 2021
- Faroese Women's Volleyball Cup: 5
  - 2009, 2010, 2019, 2020, 2021

== See also ==
- List of sport associations in the Faroe Islands
