= Vágs Kappróðrarfelag =

Faroese rowing club

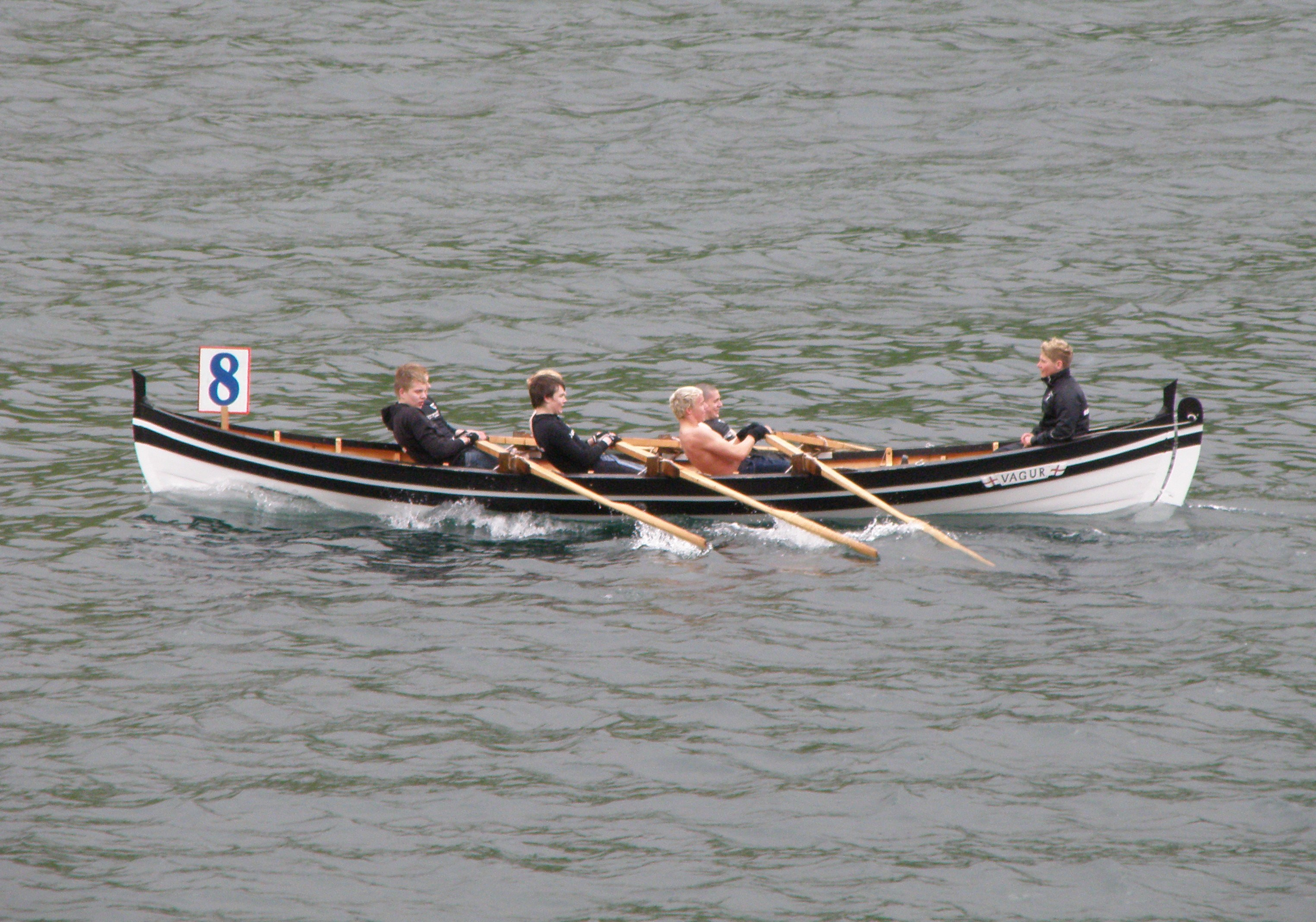
Royndin Fríða, one of the boats of Vágs Kappróðrarfelag.

Vágs Kappróðrarfelag (Vágur Rowing Club) is a Faroese rowing club from Vágur in Suðuroy, which was founded in July 1943.

== Boats for Rowing Competitions ==
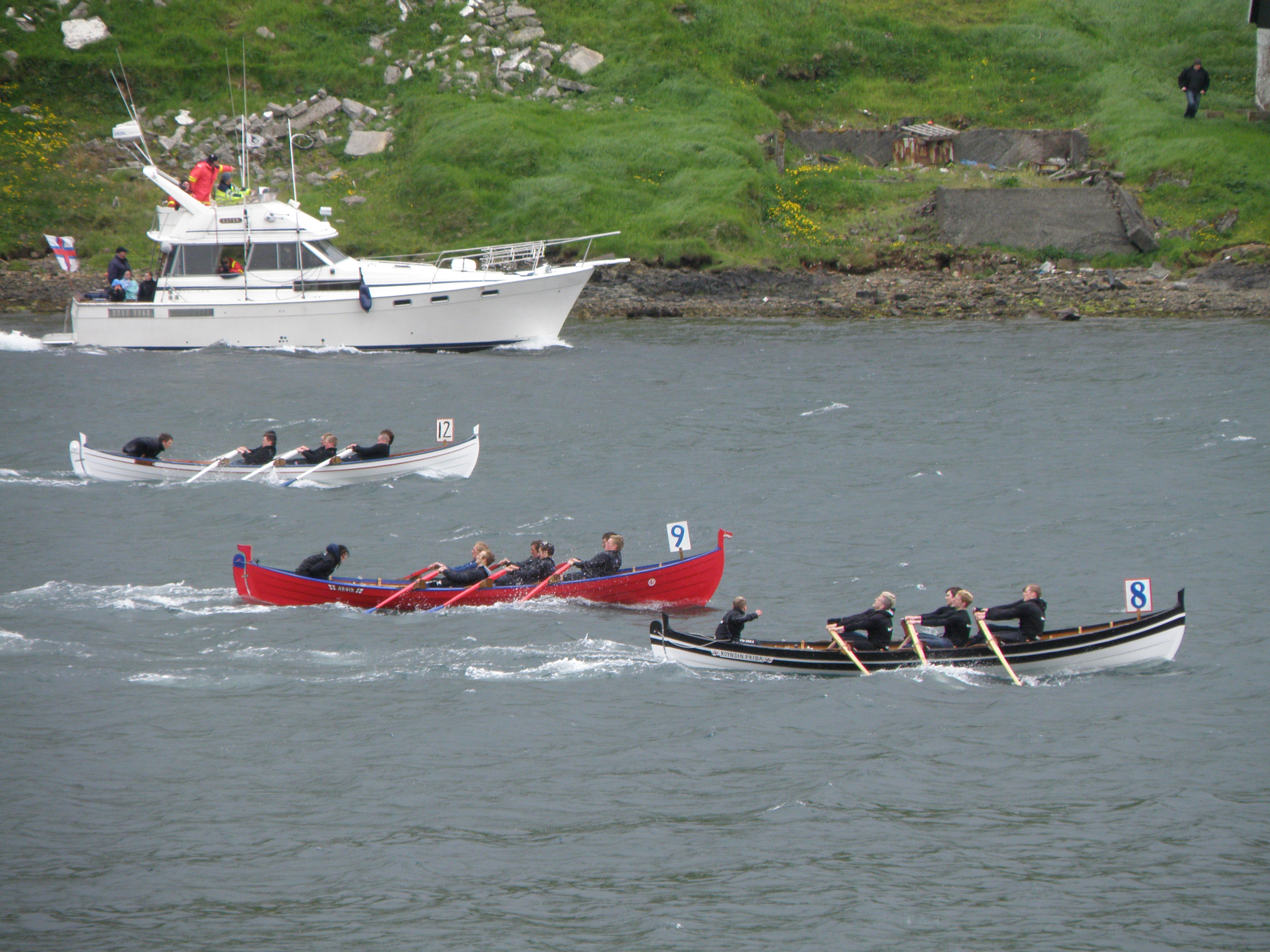
Rowing competition at Jóansøka in Vágur in June 2010. Royndin Fríða is the white and black boat. They won this competition.

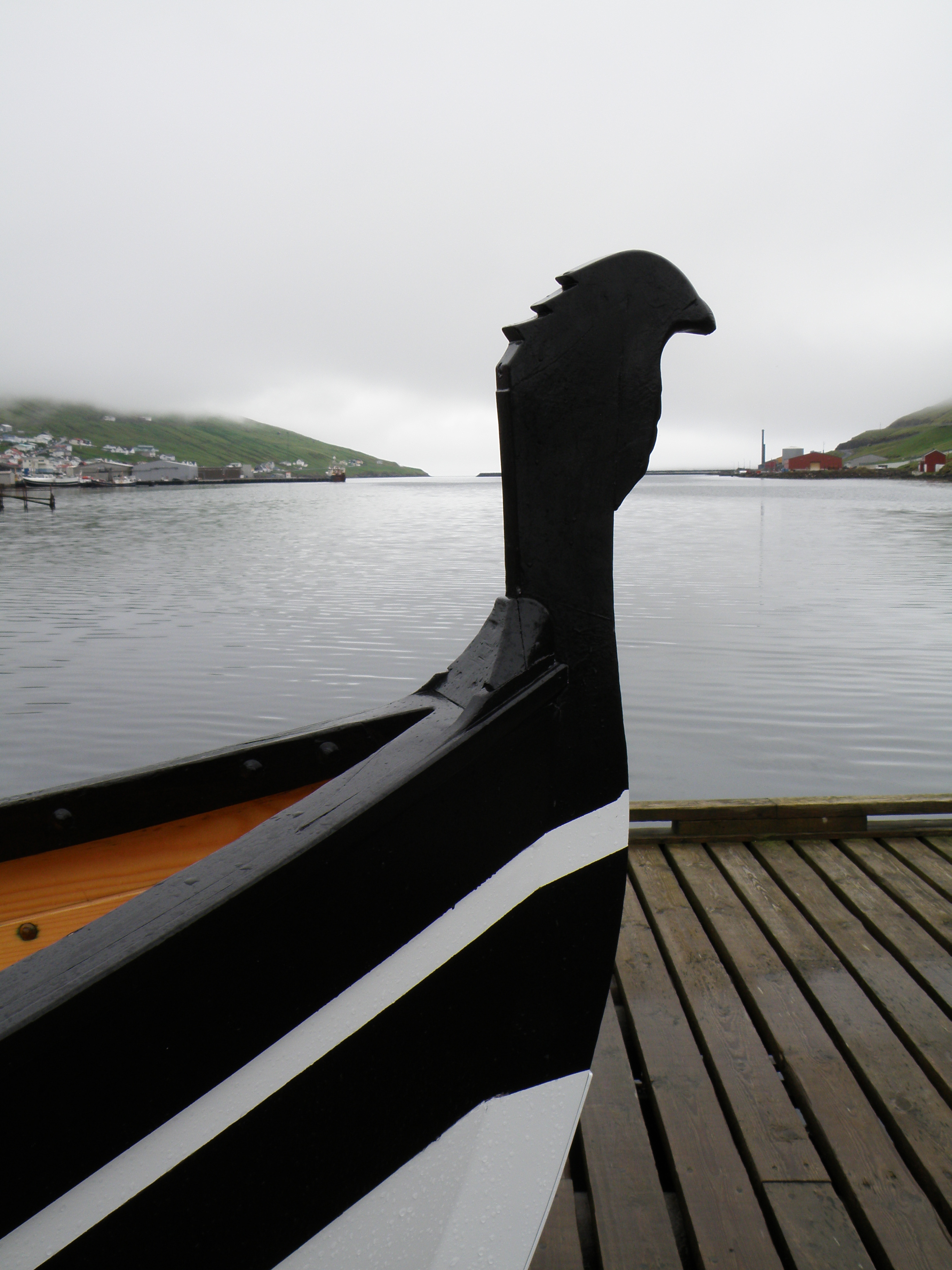
The stem of Smyril has the shape of the bird Merlin (Smyril is the Faroese word for Merlin).

Every summer there are several rowing competitions around the islands, starting with the Norðoyastevna in Klaksvík and ending in Tórshavn at the Ólavsøka on 28 July. Vágs Kappróðrarfelag has boats in different sizes. There are competitions for different categories: The children have their own rowing competitions in 5-mannafar. Boys U-18 in 5-mannafar, Girls U-18 in 5-mannafar, Women in 5-mannafar, Men in 6-mannafar, Men in 8-mannafar and Men in 10-mannafar.

== Community Involvement and Youth Development ==
Vágs Kappróðrarfelag is deeply integrated into the community life of Vágur and the wider Suðuroy region. Beyond competing in rowing events, the club places strong emphasis on youth development, offering training programs for children and teenagers to learn traditional Faroese rowing techniques. These programs not only teach physical skills but also promote values such as teamwork, perseverance, and respect for maritime heritage. Many of the club’s younger members go on to compete in regional and national competitions, helping to sustain and renew interest in Faroese rowing.

The club also organizes annual rowing festivals and participates in educational outreach to local schools, where students are introduced to the history and importance of rowing in Faroese culture. This connection between sport and tradition helps ensure that rowing remains a vibrant part of community identity on Suðuroy.

== Cultural Impact and Traditions ==
Rowing with Vágs Kappróðrarfelag is more than just a sport; it is a celebration of Faroese history and maritime life. The design of the club’s boats often reflects local symbolism, such as the bird-shaped stem on the Smyril, linking the club’s modern activities to centuries-old seafaring traditions. The club’s participation in the annual rowing season, which spans numerous islands and culminates at the Ólavsøka festival, highlights the shared cultural heritage among Faroese communities.

Vágs Kappróðrarfelag also plays a role in preserving traditional craftsmanship through the maintenance and restoration of its boats, working closely with local boat builders to uphold authentic construction methods. This focus on preservation ensures that Faroese rowing remains a living tradition, passed down through generations.

=== The Boats of Vágs Kappróðrarfelag ===
10-mannafar - Boats for 10 Rowers

- Vágbingur - Built in 1968 by boat builder Niclas í Koltri
- Vágbingur, built in 2000, by Kaj Hammer
- Vágbingur, (prior Kjølur from Kollafjørður, brought to Vágur ín 2005. The boat was built in 1997; it was the first boat which boat builder Sámal Hansen built.

8-mannafar - Boats for 8 Rowers

- Toftaregin, built in 1934. It was in bad shape some years ago. It was restored by Jóannes í Ósagarð and Asbjørn Muller from Vágur.

6-mannafar - Boats for 6 Rowers

- Smyril, built in 2003 by boat builder Sámal Hansen.

5-mannafar - Boats for 6 Rowers 5-mannafar has the same number of rowers, but the boats are smaller than 6-mannafar.

- Royndin Fríða, built in 1998 by Kaj Hammer.
- Royndin Fríða, built in 2004 by Sámal Hansen.

6-mannafar - Boat for 6 Rowers

Svalan is a 6-mannafar rowing boat belonging to Vágs Kappróðrarfelag. Built in 2012 by boat builder Sámal Hansen, Svalan combines traditional Faroese boat-building methods with modern design to ensure both durability and competitive performance. The boat is used in the men’s 6-mannafar category and has been an important part of the club’s fleet for regional and national rowing competitions. Its name, meaning “The Swallow,” reflects the boat’s swift and agile nature on the water.

== Faroese Champions ==
Rowing is a very old tradition in the Faroe Islands, and rowing competitions go back a long time. But in the old days it was more for fun and not organized in competitions. In 1973 the regular rowing competitions, which are called Faroese Championships in Rowing (FM) started in the Faroe Islands. The Faroese name for these competitions is FM, short for Føroyameistaraheitið. Since 1973 Vágs Kappróðrarfelag has won 5 Faroese Championships:

- 1980 Vágbingur, 10-mannafør for men.
- 1982 Smyril, 6-mannafør for women.
- 1994 Royndin Fríða, 5-mannafør for boys.
- 2002 Smyril, 6-mannafør for men.
- 2003 Smyril, 6-mannafør for men.
