= Waldemar Nowicki =

Polish footballer

Personal information
- Date of birth: January 23, 1961 (age 65)
- Place of birth: Mirsk, Poland
- Height: 1.86 m (6 ft 1 in)
- Position: Goalkeeper

Youth career
- Włókniarz Mirsk
- Juvenia Wrocław
- Ślęza Wrocław

Senior career*
Years	Team	Apps	(Gls)
1982	Orzeł Ząbkowice Śląskie		
1982–1991	Zagłębie Wałbrzych		
1992–1994	KP Wałbrzych		
1994–1997	B71 Sandoy	70	(0)
1997–1998	Miedź Legnica		
1998–1999	Górnik Wałbrzych		
1999	B71 Sandoy	16	(0)
2000	B71 Sandoy	17	(0)
2000–2001	Górnik Wałbrzych		
2001–2005	B71 Sandoy	78	(0)
2008–2013	B71 Sandoy	2	(0)

Managerial career
- 2003: B71 Sandoy
- * Club domestic league appearances and goals

Waldemar Nowicki (born 23 January 1961) is a Polish former professional footballer who played as a goalkeeper.

== Career ==
Waldemar Nowicki has played a great deal of his career with B71 Sandoy, but has also played football for several Polish teams. He was very well known on the Faroe Islands for being a part of B71's successful stint in the early 1990s. He played his last game for B71 Sandoy in 2013. He has assisted several of B71's head coaches, and has himself taken on the head coach job, even though it was only for the second part of the 2003 season.
