= B71 Sandoy =

Faroese sports club

B71
- Full name: Sandoyar Ítróttarfelag, B71
- Nickname: B71
- Founded: January 1, 1970; 56 years ago
- Ground: Inni í Dal; Sandur, Faroes
- Capacity: 2000 (300 seated)
- Chairman: Búi Falkvard Clementsen
- Head Coach: Bailey Reid
- League: Faroe Islands Premier League
- 2026: 1. deild, 1st of 10 (promoted)
Home colours	Away colours

B71 (Sandoy) (B71 being short for Bóltfelagið 1971 – literal translation: "Ball Club 1971") is a Faroese football club, playing their home games Inni í Dal, Sandur. Teams are made up of players from all the towns on the island of Sandoy and the official long form name is Sandoyar Ítróttarfelag B71.

== Current squad ==
Note: Flags indicate national team as defined under FIFA eligibility rules; some limited exceptions apply. Players may hold more than one non-FIFA nationality.

No.	Pos.	Nation	Player
1	GK	FRO	Klæmint F. Olsen
2	DF	FRO	Jákup Høgnason
3	DF	FRO	Jens Jóan Paulason Olsen
4	DF	DEN	Mathias Myrthue
5	DF	FRO	Sverri Hansson
7	MF	FRO	Suni Herman Petersen
8	MF	DEN	Tobias Koktvedgaard
9	MF	DEN	Lucas Ørneborg
10	MF	DEN	Jonathan Canto
12	DF	USA	Alejandro Medina Ortega

No.	Pos.	Nation	Player
13	MF	DEN	Mads Svane
14	MF	FRO	Bogi Hentze (captain)
15	MF	FRO	Bergur Simonsen
20	MF	FRO	Aron Clementsen
22	FW	GHA	Eric Oteng
23	MF	FRO	Óli á Reynatúgvu
25	FW	FRO	Rúnar Davidsen
26	DF	FRO	Nóa F. Petersen
28	DF	FRO	Dánial Sørensen
99	GK	FRO	Wenningsted Ørvarodd

== The Club history ==
=== Origins (1970–1971) ===
Although B71 is one of the youngest football-teams in the Faroe Islands, there has always been a considerable amount of interest in sports on the particular island from which the team fares. Football had been played well before B71 was established in 1970, but since sand-surfaces were deemed unsuitable for football, a team had yet to be formed.

In the late 1960s, two of the island's towns, Sandur and Skopun, started to compete. There were no goals, so instead they used two rocks each, representing goalposts. This rivalry between two of Sandoy's biggest towns went on for several summers, bringing in truckloads of people from Skopun, even though cars had yet to be accessible to the common man.

At around the same time, a new school was being built on Sandoy, where there also would be built a field on which to play sports. As a result of this, people started talking about forming a new team and on New Year's Day 1970, a sports team was established. The preliminary year, the team was called Sand, since only players from the town of Sandur were fielded. But the following year the team's name was changed to B71. Since players from the entire island wanted to be a part of the team, it no longer seemed fitting to name the team after just one town.

The first year only two teams were fielded. One senior team, playing in, what in those days was referred to as Meðaldeildin and one boys-team.

=== The Early Years (1972–1985) ===
In the beginning, B71 took baby-steps towards their eventual greater years in the late 1980s, early-to-mid-1990s. Players like Eli Hentze, Torbjørn Jensen, brothers Róin and Jóan Petur Clementsen, and many more, were still playing in the youth divisions, and would not feature prominently until they came of age in the second half of the 1980s.

=== Faroese Champions (1986–1989) ===
Nothing really spectacular happened until B71 became 3. division champions in 1986. Two years later, in 1988, they won the 2. division and then, remarkably, they became 1. division champions in 1989, without losing a single game that year. When all was said and done, B71 ended up with a resounding 31-point tally, as opposed to a more modest 22 points by runners-up HB, who, coincidentally, were pummeled 6–2 in the final match of the season against none other than, B71.

B71's success has, in later years, been attributed largely to the successful blend of a Polish influence, consisting of coach Jan Kaczynski, robust midfielder, turned coach, Piotr Krakowski, goalkeeper Waldemar Nowicki, and local players, including, Eli Hentze, Ib Mohr Olsen, Páll á Reynatúgvu, Torbjørn Jensen, brothers Róin and Jóan Petur Clementsen.

B71 also reached the final of the Faroese Cup in 1989. The initial match resulted in a 1–1 draw, but they ended up losing 2–0 after the replay.

In the space of 3–4 years B71 had gone from being an obscure 3. division side, to Faroese 1. division champions.

=== Relegation shocker (1990) ===
B71 were unable to defend their title the following year. Instead, everything ended in catastrophe. Rather than posing a title challenge, B71 were relegated, forced to spend at least a year in the second-best division. But B71 were promoted the next year.

=== The infamous Faroese Cup finals (1993–1994) ===
Although B71 continued to pose a threat in the Faroese top-division during the early 1990s, (never finishing lower than 4th) they never captured the league trophy a second time. Instead, focus turned to the Faroese Cup, where B71 had even greater success during their reign as one of the top sides in Faroese football.

B71 reached the finals in two consecutive years. The first time in 1993 against HB who they beat 2–0, winning the trophy for the first and only time so far, and again the year later, in 1994 where they lost 2–1 against KÍ.

=== Relegation/Promotion saga (1996–2006) ===
B71 went from finishing fourth in 1995 to finishing eighth in 1996, and subsequently finishing bottom of the league a year later. This meant being relegated to the second division, only to gain promotion in 1998.

Instability tainted the play of B71, who, in spite of this, avoided relegation for a couple of years, until they finally went down in 2001, after having lost the relegation playoff against Skála.

B71 would have to wait until the 2006 season before regaining promotion again, to what had since been renamed Formuladeildin, for the fourth time since 1988.

==== Rise of the women's game ====
During this time, when the B71 men repeatedly disappointed, it was the women's team that shone. Winning matches was a daily occurrence for the women of B71 through much of the 1990s.

The youth squads of B71 also seemed to produce quality players, greatly due to the hiring of youth-coach Martin Kúrberg who stayed with B71 for many years.

Several of the players from the youth-ranks would become regular B71 players, but the women's team, despite a successful start, declined until B71 were unable to enter a team to the women's competition altogether. Efforts have since been made to resurrect the team, but they have yet to replicate the success of B71's Golden Girls.

=== B71's Resurgency (2007) ===
B71 were touted as sure relegation candidates before the 2007 season, even before the first match, but halfway through the season, B71 had proven all of the pundits wrong, with results such as a 0–3 away win at holders HB, a 1–0 home win against B36 and a 4–2 away thrashing against title-contenders EB/Streymur. At the end of the season B71 were well out of relegation danger and in the safe-zone.

=== Pre-season row, relegation and manager-shifts (2008–2009) ===
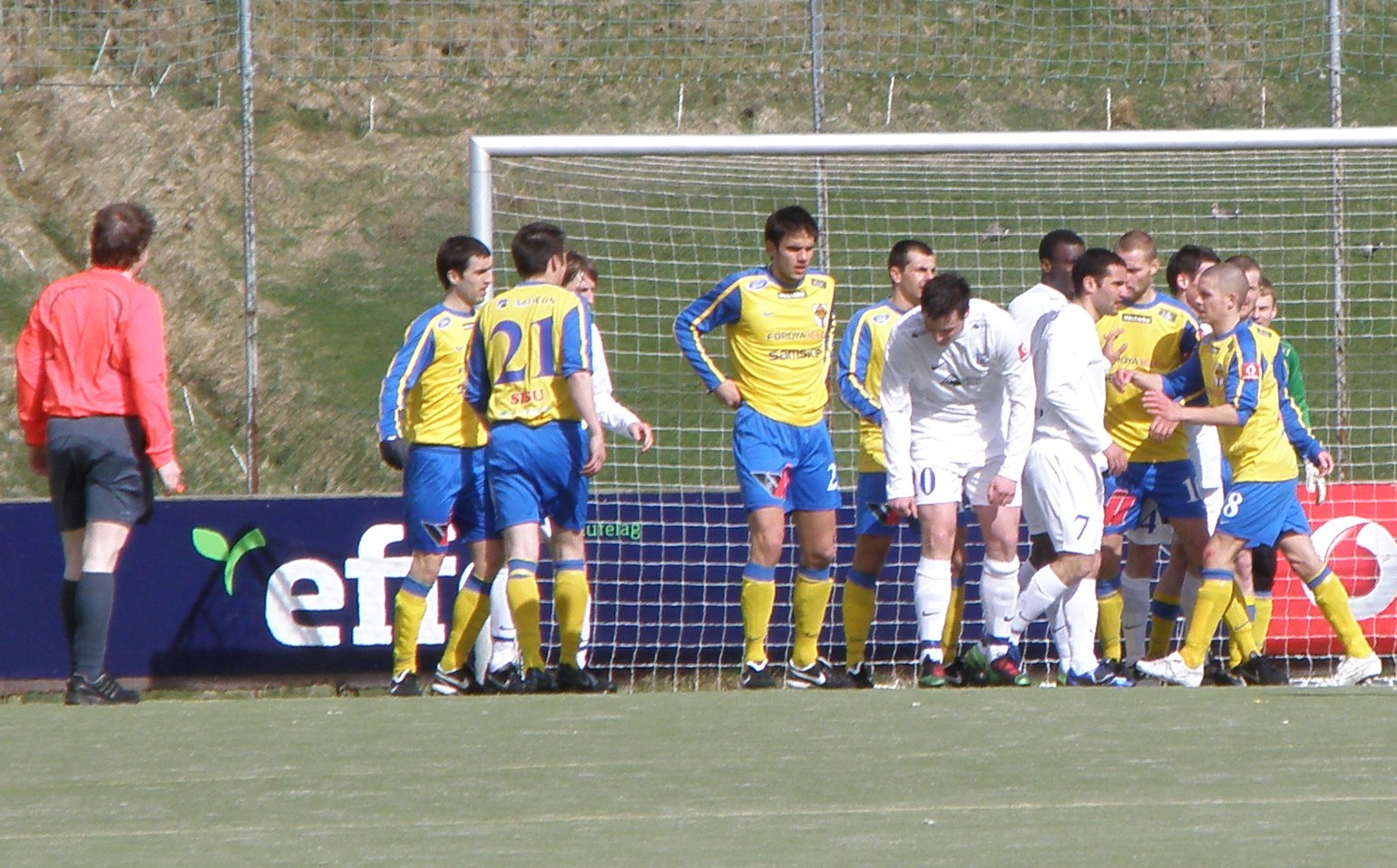
B71 vs. FC Suðuroy in Vodafonedeildin on 2. May 2010. B71 won the match 3–1.

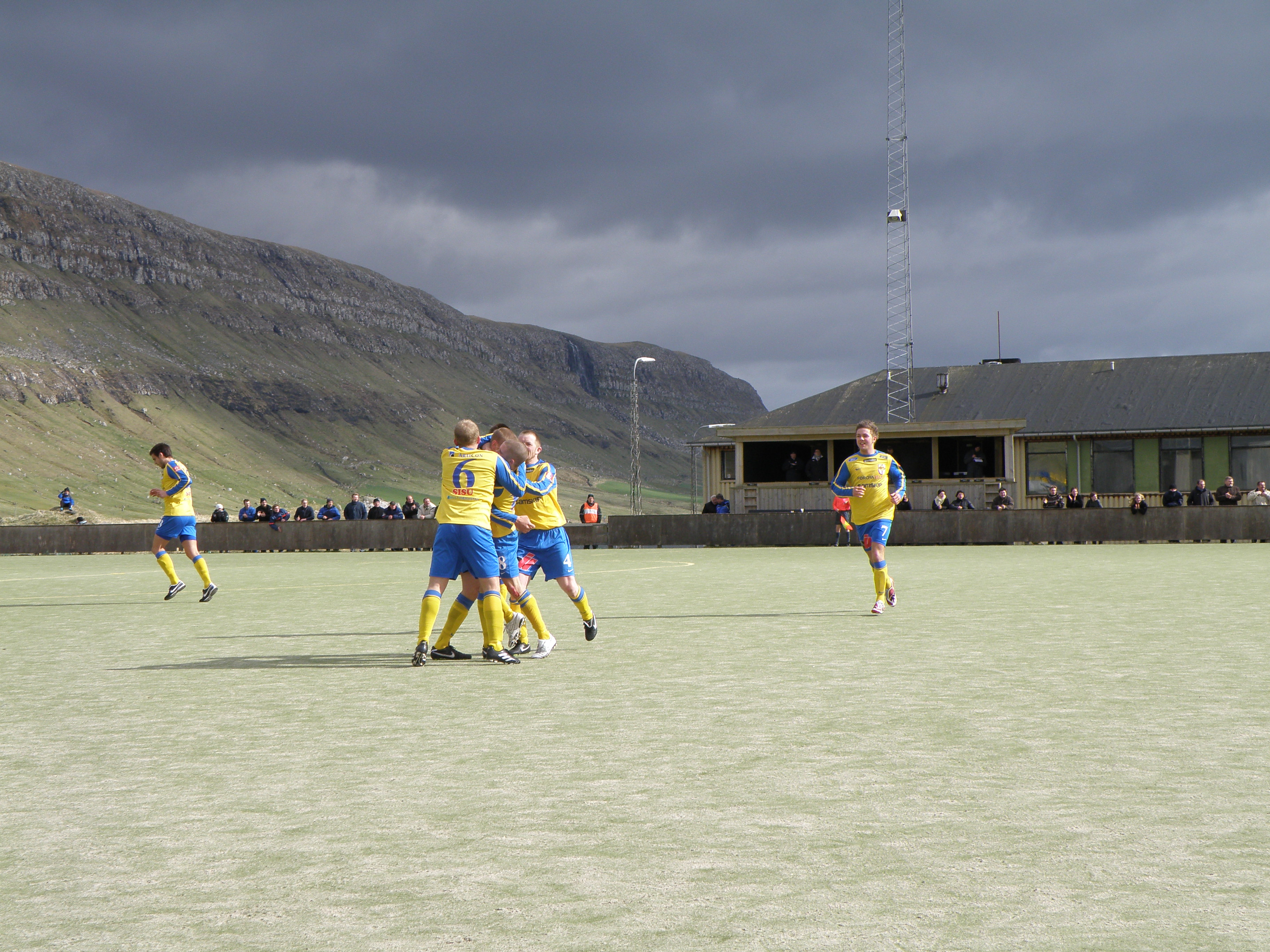
B71 vs. FC Suðuroy in Vodafonedeildin on 2. May 2010. B71 won the match 3–1. This is just after B71 scored one of their 3 goals.

The 2008 season was kicked off with B71 once again being named underdogs, but this time B71 provided few surprises. Instead they went on a losing streak, only to salvage the first half of the season on the finishing line, when they played convincingly and won three of their last matches.

B71 had been unsettled pre-season, with the departure and absence of many key-players. The most prominent of which was one Magnus Olsen. There was much controversy and tension between B71 and B36 regarding the player in question. Allegations of tapping up and player-poaching echoed from the B71 camp, while B36 kept refuting the claims, suggesting that the B71 board had been notified of the club's interest in Magnus.

This resulted in many appeals and re-appeals to the highest footballing authority in The Faroe Islands, FSF. B71 were eventually deemed to have no case and Magnus Olsen's much coveted player license was transferred to B36.

Apart from Magnus Olsen, players including Hanus Clementsen, Jóhannis Jensen and Clayton Soares were all ruled out, while successful defender Anders Rasmussen had left, during pre-season. Three games into the season, B71's talented young winger Rasmus Nielsen was injured in a bout with Fróði Benjaminsen and would be out for the entire first half of the season.

The second part of the season was considered somewhat better than the first, with the team playing better football and producing fair results, but in the end they came up short with a meager 22 points. Despite the low point tally, B71 did have slim chances of avoiding relegation right up until the second-last match of the season, when they lost 0–1 at home against Víkingur.

Since the relegation became a reality, two key-players from the B71 squad signed with different clubs. Goalkeeper Símun Rógvi Hansen and talented midfielder Gudmund Nielsen, both 21, signed with HB and champions EB/Streymur, respectively. In addition to this, winger Rasmus Nielsen left during the break, to play for, then, newly promoted Tórshavn side, AB, while three of B71's four Brazilian players were released, leaving Clayton Soares as the only Brazilian to reprise his role in the team.

At around the same time, coach Eli Hentze announced he had made the decision to step down from coaching B71's first-team. He was later replaced by Frankie Jensen, who hales from Sandoy, but lives in Tórshavn.

Subsequently, it was announced that Frankie Jensen had been released from his contract, and Eli Hentze was appointed new head-coach, for the third time in his career and at the end of the 2009 season, Eli Hentze stepped down, and former 07 Vestur coach, Piotr Krakowski, succeeded him. Appointing Piotr Krakowski has been dubbed coming home, by the media, for the highly rated coach, because of his affiliation with the team in the 1990s.

B71 had, before this, clinched promotion to top-flight football, on the second to last match-day of the season, after a single year in 1. Deild

=== Relegations (2010–2013) ===
B71 managed to keep themselves up in the 2010 season, finishing 8th, but had a torrid time during the following 2011 season. Efforts were made to sign foreign players Tijani Mohammed and Joseph Bassene as well as re-sign previous B71 players such as goalkeeper Símun Rógvi Hansen and Serbian defender Bojan Zivic. This didn't seem to have the intended effect and the team was on a terrible losing streak going into the second half of the season. Ghambian-born Dane Bakary Bojang and Andrezej Bednarz from Poland were recruited to try and salvage an otherwise miserable season, but to no avail. Despite slightly improved results, B71 finished dead last with only 11 points from 27 matches. Being relegated to second-tier football didn't help results either. Most of the players from the previous season left the club, leaving only young players to pick up the pieces. B71 finished just above relegation in eighth place in 2012 and could not improve a year later, finishing last for the second time in three years. This meant a return to third tier football for the first time since the initial promotion in 1986, 28 years ago.

=== 2nd division (2014) ===
2014 marked an unwelcome return to third tier football for the club. It was touch and go a couple of times and ultimately B71 needed a win in the second to last round in order to secure promotion, before meeting, already promoted and division winners, MB on the final day of the campaign.

Initially, promotion looked unsure, as B71 unexpectedly lost 2–0 away against ÍF and by all accounts had to win the last match. However, ÍF had used an illegal player in this 2–0 victory and B71 won their appeal to the Faroese Football Association, thus clinching promotion on a technicality.

=== 1st division (2015–2016) ===
In 2015, the team placed seventh in the league at the end of the season; it was safe from relegation, yet far from promotion.

Perhaps this was the reason for the teams second year in the division. Accumulating only 13 points in 27 matches and at the bottom of the league. Once again heading to the third best tier for at least a season.

=== Promotion (2017) ===
2017 marked major changes for Sandoyar Ítróttarfelag B71. Though the club was financially healthy and with a good youth set up, the flagship men's team was haemorrhaging points and struggling to keep the attention of the local community. In order to reinvigorate the club, the entire board made the decision to step down and new board members were elected. This was not without problems in the initial phase, but what followed was new life for the men's first team, as well as the continuation of the progress that the previous board had made. Promotion was secured well before the end of the season, as well as winning the league before the last match day.

=== Back in 1st division (2018–2020) ===
After just one year in the 2nd division, B71 embarked on another season in the second tier, led by head coach, Bakary Bojang, who had one year left of his tenure. After some good results in the first half of the season, though, Bakary had to step down as head coach for personal reasons. The club sought to bring in a replacement and hired Swedish coach Stefan Hansson to finish the remainder of the season. However, differences between the club and coach meant that newly appointed Hansson stepped down before the last game of the season. Former B71 player and coach, now Faroese U21 national team coach, Eli Hentze, came in to rescue the men's team from relegation danger. Eli and the B71 first men's team scored enough points before the end of the season to secure another year in the second tier.

In 2019, the club searched for a new head coach and thought they might have found a long-term solution in Coerver coach, Heiðar Birnir Torleifsson. Disaster struck towards the end of the first half of the season, when Heiðar, also left the club for personal reasons. The club was now in an identical situation as before. Once again, Eli Hentze took the reins for the initial couple of matches in the second half of the season, as caretaker. A month into the second half, B71 appointed Irish born Christopher Harrington as new head coach until the end of the season. Harrington managed to climb the table from relegation danger and B71 finished in a more respectable 7th position. After the end of the season, it was announced that Christopher Harrington would leave B71 to join HB as joint women's- and head of youth coach. B71 appointed Englishman Richard Goffe from ÍBV as new head coach, days before Christmas, on a 2-year deal, until the end of the 2021 season.

The 2020 season started positively for the new head coach and B71, with an optimistic draw against fellow promotion candidates 07 Vestur, as well as a draw and a win in the two following matches. This was, however, followed with mixed results, alternating defeats and wins until the break. In spite of this, B71 was sitting comfortably mid table and still had a shot promotion within reach. B71 signed prolific striker, Valdemar Schousboe, from Marienlyst for the second half of the season, who went on to score 11 goals for the club in as many games, keeping B71 in the running for promotion. A fractured foot meant a premature end to his season with the Faroese club. The loss of Valdemar, seemed to coincide with a poor run of form in the last part of the season, where B71 lost the majority of their games and dropped into eighth place, although finishing the season some way off relegation.

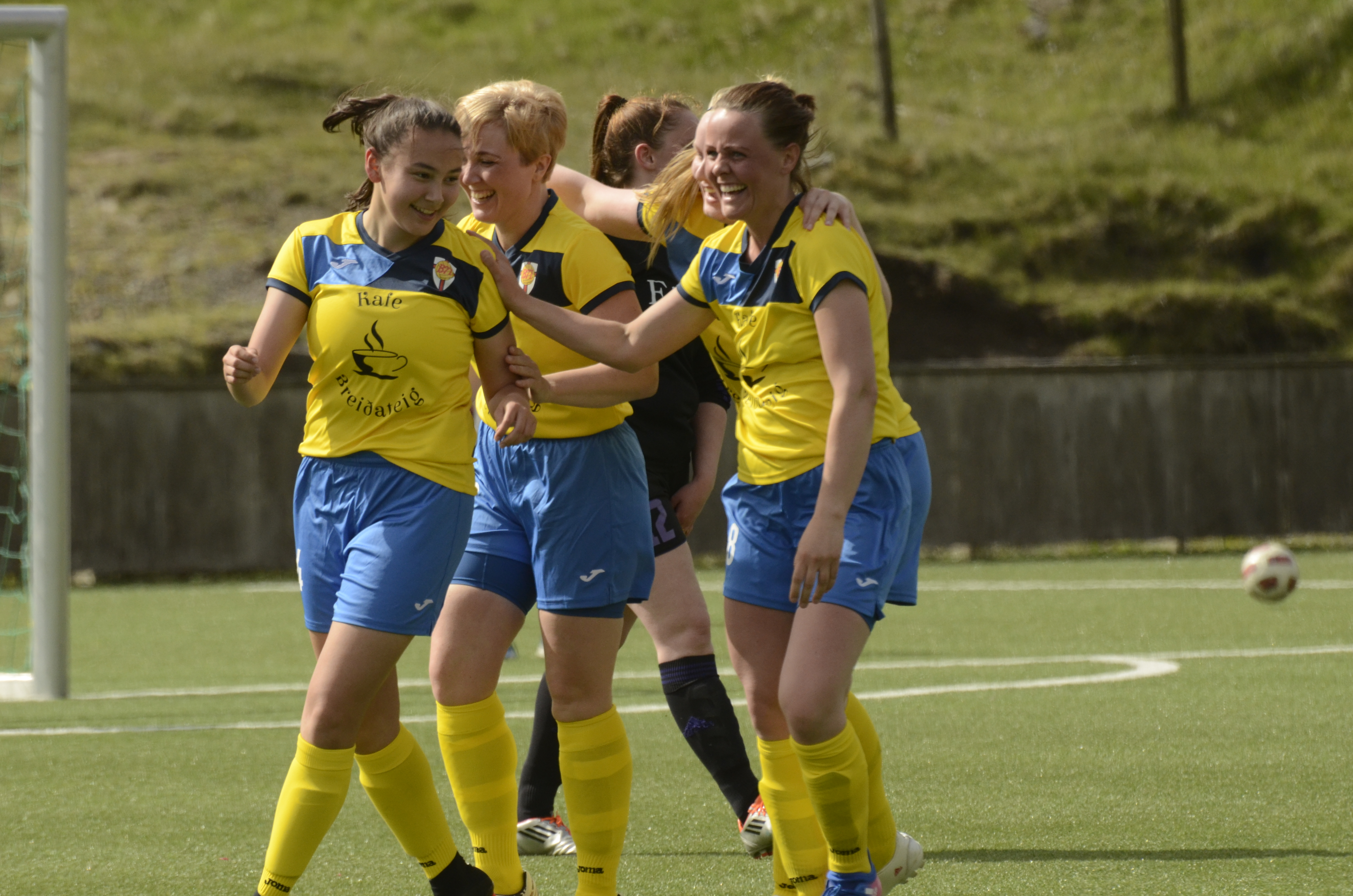
Women's team players: Tórunn, Sólrun, Sigrid and Gerda in a match against Giza Hoyvík in 2017.

==== Rise of the women's game pt. II ====
The newly formed women's team was led by youth and head coach, Bakary Bojang. The women were, rather optimistically, entered into the Premier Division for their first season back and this was close to derail the entire venture, suffering heavy losses for a couple of matches, before being allowed to relegate to a lower division, which hadn't started the season at that point. B71 merged the team with AB and the two clubs and this, coupled with the move to a lower division was especially beneficial for the team, finishing third in the division.

A year later in 2018, ambitions were higher and the women's team finished in second place in the second women's tier. In 2019, the women were hungry for gold, but yet again they finished second, a couple of points behind leaders 07 Vestur.

Finally in the 2020 season, the women's team finished first, after competing with 07 Vestur for the title in the second best division, who also followed AB/B71 to the Premier Division for the 2021 season.

Hopes were high for this first season in the top division, but reality soon set in, as AB/B71 went on a losing streak for almost the entire season, even though attempts were made with bolstering the squad with Swedish born players Anna Maja Steenari and Linnéa Magnusson, as well as Danish/Faroese Rebekka Katrine Dahl Olsen coming in from Denmark, all to no avail. AB/B71 managed to salvage a single win in the second to last round, beating HB 2–1 at home Inni í Dal on Sandoy. The following week, AB/B71 lost the final game of the season against title holders and 2021 Champions, KÍ, ending the season in last place.

In December 2021 it was announced that B71 had decided to end the women's partnership with AB.

=== Pushing for promotion (2021–2022) ===
Although 2020 finished in a disappointing manner, given the promising start, the 2021 season proved to be somewhat refreshing and yielded better results. B71 started poorly, losing the opening five games of the season, before racking up around 20 points over the next run of games, leading to B71 placing 2nd in the league before the summer break. The second half of the season saw nearest competitors for the promotion spot, AB, closing the gap on B71 and even going in front with a fair point margin. Towards then end of the season, AB stumbled and B71 reduced the point gap to just 2 points, leaving it all to play for on the final day of the season, which coincidentally was a home tie for B71 against none other than AB. A win on the final day of the season would mean that B71 promoted instead of AB. B71 were up 1-0 for a while in the 1st half, but ultimately the game ended in a 1–1 draw, which secured AB's promotion to the top division for the 2022 season. B71, in turn, finished the season in a respectable fourth-place position, which also marked the highest league placing since relegating from the top division in 2011.

The 2022 season marked the fifth consecutive year of first division football for B71. Spurred on by good results in the previous season, hopes were high for having another go at promotion, bringing in an American trio of players in James Drye, Jovanni "Gio" Garcia and Carter Beck, Icelandic Ágúst Birgisson and Símun Rógvi Hansen in goal. Notable players departing this season were Brazilian father-son duo, Clayton and Klayver, with Clayton retiring and Klayver leaving to join HB. Jákup Høgnason would also leave in the summer break to study abroad.

Season would start slowly with draws against new-comers Undrið and second string side NSÍ, before two wins and then another draw, this time against promotion favorites ÍF. Then alternating between wins and losses, before ending the first half with back to back losses against KÍ and TB.

==== Guli Dalurin ====
Efforts were made in the summer break to establish the first ever B71 supporters group. The initial intention was to have the supporters group up and running properly for the 2023 season, but the poor run of games in the second half, seemed to introduce a certain urgency and only served to speed up the process of establishing the supporters group. After some deliberation on name, representatives and objectives, Guli Dalurin was formally introduced as B71's new supporters' group at the club's upcoming home game 20 August 2022, against 07 Vestur. The game ended in a 2-0 home win, which was followed with a narrow defeat in Leirvík against Víkingur. From there on, B71's men's side won all of the remaining 8 games of the season, racking up an impressive 24 points, which even resulted in the promotion race being decided on the last game day, with TB and B71 level on points. where B71 beat newly crowned champions ÍF, in Fuglafjørður. 3 points weren't enough though B71 was level on points with TB, sitting in the promotion place, 6 goals separated the sides after the last game of the season, with TB finishing 3rd and attaining automatic promotion, while B71, for the second year running, finished 4th, narrowly missing out on promotion.

=== 2023 ===
Both Skála and a shock relegated NSÍ side, were favourites to bounce back and promote to the top division within a year. It was believed that the Sandoy side were stronger and more experienced and could cause an upset throughout the season.

Foreign players this year included Swedish pair Isak Tejeda and William Ankerhake, as well as Alejandro Ortega Medina from the US and Romulo Bosquiero from Brazil. Although early signs were promising, there was a falling out between players as well as disciplinary problems, which led to the departure of all of the foreign-born players, except for Romulo Bosquiero, who would go on to feature for a second season as well.

The first run of games were also a sign of things to come. B71 had its worst start in years, racking up only 8 points in the opening 7 games as well as only managing 18 points in the entire first half of the season. Things improved in the second half of the season, with the side earning another 29 out of a possible 36 points and salvaging a 5th place finish, but well away from any promotion spot.

=== New blood (2024) ===
James Drye, who had successfully partnered Romulo Bosquiero last season, left to join newly promoted NSÍ, while popular "Rom" rejoined the squad for the 2024 season as both player and head youth coach. Eduardo Coimbra, recommended in part by Rom himself, joined the team. Filling the void at the back was Hunter Boaz Bell and Harry Kircher from Sweden was also brought in to bolster the squad depth in the goalkeeping department. Local younger players also featured more and more these past years and the newly opened subsea tunnel to Sandoy meant that recruiting talent from outside of Sandoy became easier. Especially players with family ties to B71 and the island were recruited. Sproti úr Dímun had already joined from outside of the clubs youth set up and next in line were Julian and Aron F. Knudsen, all with family ties to Sandoy and fathers who had played with B71's first team in the past.

B71 occupied a solid place in the upper half of the table and were producing good results against promotable teams like AB, FC Suðuroy and TB. B71's de-facto second team, the U21s, were also on an unprecedented roll this year and nearly went undefeated throughout the U21 B-group, promoting to the A-group for the second half of the season, as well as qualifying to the later rounds of the U21 cup.

They carried on with slight hiccups along the way for the first team in the second half of the season and excitement was in the air for the third to last league game against main rivals TB, with B71 2 points ahead in a promotion spot. With the last two games of the season being against HB and KÍ second string teams, the prognosis was that winning the TB game would all but clinch a promotion.

The game in Suðuroy went B71's way in the beginning. B71 scored first just before half time, but TB equalized at the start of the second. A draw could still suffice to hold of TB for the remaining two games, but in the last 15 minutes, disaster struck. Starting with B71's penalty appeal being denied, after long-serving goalscorer Tijani M. Yakubu was brought down by the keeper, things went from bad to worse, when TB went ahead in the 82nd minute. A red card in the 86th minute also complicated matters and made it virtually impossible to return to level terms. The game in Suðuroy ended 2-1 in TB's favour, which meant they went ahead by 1 point going into the last two games of the season.

B71 went on to win the remaining two and although TB coasted past KÍ in the second to last game, winning 3-1, they ran into a bit more trouble against FC Hoyvík, who held onto a draw until the 74th minute when TB scored and went on to win by a one goal margin. TB finished the season on 45 points, while B71, once again, missed their opportunity, finishing 4th in the league with 44 points.

Fortunately for B71, blushes were saved by the U21 side, who carried on their invincible performances in the second half of the season, clinching the top spot and securing the club a historic U21 League Championship for the first time ever in the second to last league game, ahead of B36 in second place, who they also went on to beat in the last game of the season. A place in the U21 Cup final was also secured beforehand and they would go on to do "the double" when they beat ÍF Fuglafjørður on penalties in an equally historic cup final night at Tórsvøllur in the final days of the season.

=== Change in leadership (2025) ===
The 2025 season boasted a new batch of players brought in from outside again, as well as a competent batch of young U21 winners from the year before, with the addition of returning Suni Herman Petersen, arriving back home from his stay with EB/Streymur in the previous season. B71 captain and head youth coach, Romulo Bosquiero departed, which meant that a new head of youth was appointed in Nichlas Hjertstedt from Denmark. B71 had a solid start with 4 wins in the initial 5 games, but there were defeats against promotion rivals Skála and AB. So long-serving B71 head coach Richard Goffe was dismissed and head of youth Nichlas Hjertstedt took over as caretaker, before being formally assigned the role as head coach of the men's first team, just before the break.

Going into September, B71 were trailing second place promotion candidates AB by 9 points with 6 games remaining. AB, however, securely achieved promotion with a total of 69 points, 13 points clear of B71 in third.

== The Kit and The Crest ==
=== The Kit ===
Despite being a small club, B71 has had numerous versions of their kit, with often yearly revisions. The primary B71 kit is yellow and blue, with every B71 kit having included these colours.

The first ever B71 kit was an all yellow jersey (except for the blue sleeves and neck-line), blue shorts and yellow socks. As B71 didn't have any sponsors during its beginnings, the only decorative item on the shirt was the crest. The yellow colour of the initial jerseys was also a considerably lighter shade than they would be in later years.

During the 2007 season, B71's away kit was white, mixed with blue, resembling the Faroese flag.

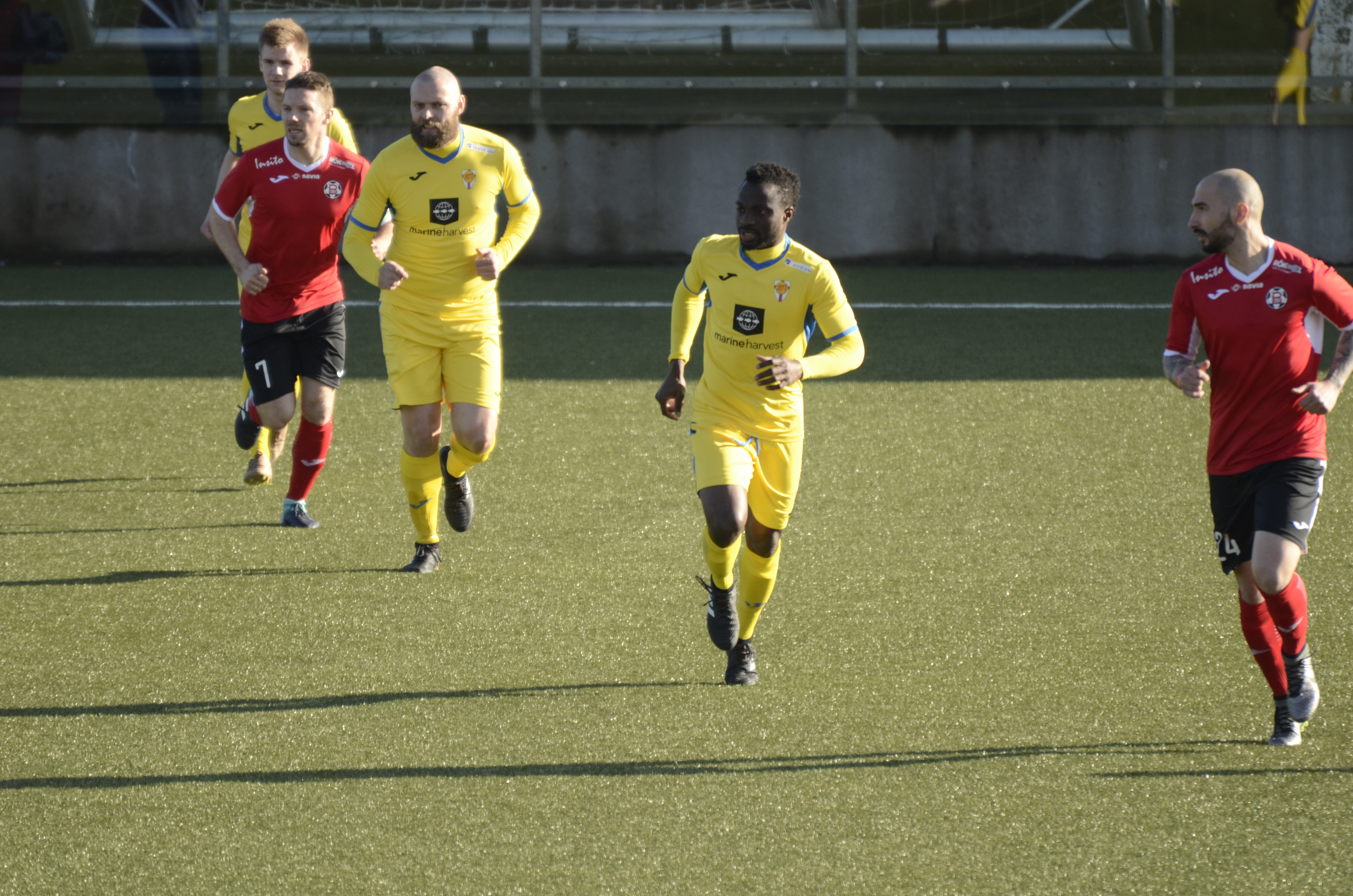
Símin Hansen and Tijani Mohammed sporting the all yellow kit for the 2018 season.

To mark the 2018 and a new modern approach for the club going forward, the kit was changed from the normal yellow shirt/blue shorts combination to an all-yellow kit.

=== The Crest ===
The club's crest shows the Faroese flag (a red, white and blue Scandinavian Cross) centred on a shield. On top of the flag, sits a yellow football, representing the primary colour of the team and the sport they play, upon which the team's name is displayed.

The crest has never been changed or altered in any way since 1970, except for the shade of yellow sometimes getting darker or lighter.

== Coaches ==
Dates	Name
1986	(Denmark) Finn Melin
1987–89	(Poland) Jan Kaczynski
1990–96	(Poland) Piotr Krakowski
1997	(Faroe Islands) Eli Hentze
1998–99	(Bulgaria) Ivan Hristov
2000	(Denmark) Per Langvad
2001	(Faroe Islands) Kári Reynheim
2002–03	(Belgium) Tom Saintfiet
2003	(Poland) Waldemar Nowicki
2004–05	(Denmark) Ole Andersen
2006	(Serbia) Dragan Kovačević
2007	(Serbia) Dušan Mokan
2007–08	(Faroe Islands) Eli Hentze
2009	(Faroe Islands) Frankie Jensen
2009	(Faroe Islands) Eli Hentze
2010	(Poland) Piotr Krakowski
2011–13	(Faroe Islands) Allan Mørkøre
2014–16	(Poland) Piotr Krakowski
2017–18	(Denmark) Bakary Bojang
2018	(Sweden) Stefan Hansson
2019	(Iceland) Heiðar Birnir Torleifsson
2019	(Republic of Ireland) Christopher Harrington
2020–2025	(England) Richard Goffe
2025-	(Denmark) Nichlas Hjertstedt

== UEFA club competition record ==
Competition	Matches	W	D	L	GF	GA
UEFA Cup	2	0	0	2	3	9
UEFA Cup Winners' Cup	2	0	0	2	0	7
**TOTAL**	**4**	**0**	**0**	**4**	**3**	**16**

Season	Competition	Round	Opponent	Results
1994–95	UEFA Cup Winners' Cup	Q	(Finland) HJK	**0–5**, 0–2
1996–97	UEFA Cup	Preliminary	(Cyprus) APOEL	**1–5**, 2–4

Home results in bold.

== Honours ==
=== Domestic ===
==== League ====
- Faroe Islands Premier League:
  - **Champions** (1): 1989
  - 3rd place (1): 1994
- Faroe Islands 1. Deild:
  - **Champions** (4): 1988, 1991, 1998, 2006
  - Runner-up (4): 2002, 2004, 2005, 2009
- Faroe Islands 2. Deild:
  - **Champions** (2): 1986, 2017
  - Runner-up (1): 2014

==== Cups ====
- Faroe Islands Cup:
  - **Champions** (1): 1993
  - Runner-up (2): 1989, 1994
- FSF Trophy:
  - **Champions** (1): 2004
  - Runner-up (1): 2005

== Other sports ==
Although considered a football club, the "B" in the club's name stands for "Ball Club", while "Sandoyar Ítróttarfelag" translates to "Sandoy Sports Club". While the main focus has always been the football side of the club, a variety of sports have recently been undertaken by the club, mainly for youths and children, largely due to the construction of the indoor sports hall in 2012.

=== Futsal ===
Football had been played indoors in the school gym since its construction in 1971, but the indoor sports hall made the concept of Futsal possible on Sandoy. It is mainly played during the winter, when the freezing temperatures and short daylight hours make playing football outside too difficult.

=== Kidsvolley ===
The last couple of years children have been participating in a simplified version of volleyball, aptly named: Kidsvolley As of a couple of years ago, "kidsvolley" is now being referred to by the Faroese term Flogbørn.

=== Handball ===
As soon as the indoor sports hall was constructed, handball practice for children was instigated. Recently, it was announced that B71 will enter youth teams into handball competitions for the first time in their history.

==== Vípan ====
While, now defunct women's handball team, Vípan never had any direct affiliation with B71, it is oftentimes spoken of in the same breath and even mentioned in B71's official club history. Founded in 1942 by doctor Leif Dahl and later coached by teacher Kjartan Hentze, Vípan was successful during its short lifespan, winning the Faroese handball championship in 1944 and again in 1949, before quietly faded into the history books.

As of a couple of years ago the name Vípan has reemerged as B71 Vípan, the current name for children's handball teams in Sandoy.

=== Tindar ===
In September 2025, in the wake of B71's annual ½-marathon event Sandoy Hálvmarathon, the subsidiary club, Tindar, was formed, aiming to promote athletics in Sandoy, with a primary focus on running.
